= Deralakatte =

- Educational, Healthcare, Commercial & Residential Locality
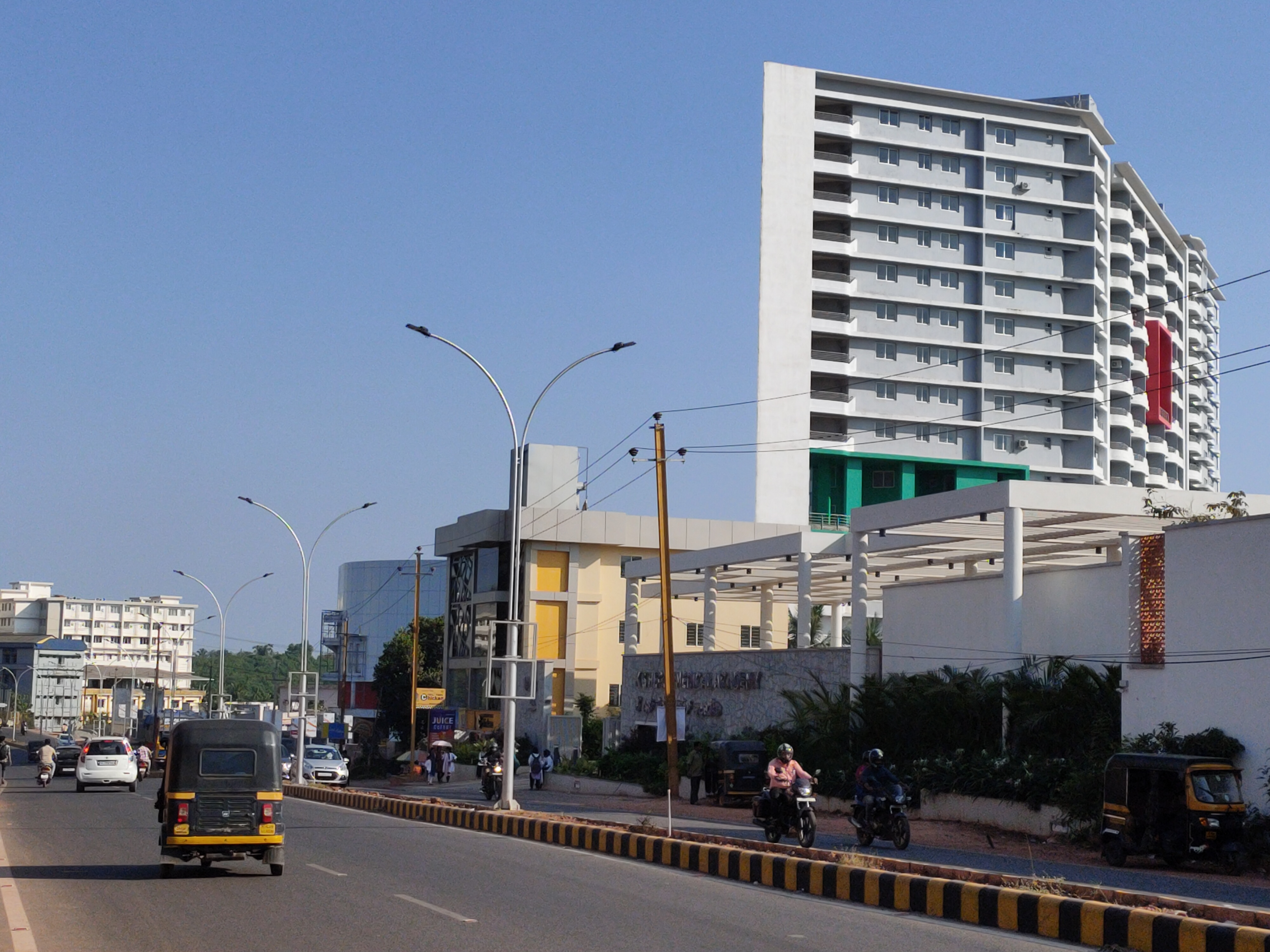
- University Road, Deralakatte, Mangalore
- Nickname: University Town
- Location in Karnataka, India Deralakatte (India)
- Coordinates: 12.8092°N 74.8916°E
- Country: India
- State: Karnataka
- District: Dakshina Kannada
- City: Mangalore
- Region: Tulunadu

Languages
  - Official: Kannada
  - Regional: Tulu, Beary, Konkani
- Time zone: UTC+5:30 (IST)
- PIN: 575018
- Telephone code: +91824
- Vehicle registration: KA 19
- City: Mangalore
- Lok Sabha constituency: Mangalore
- Climate: Humid

Deralakatte (University town) is a major educational, healthcare, commercial and residential locality in the south-eastern part of Mangalore City in the Dakshina Kannada district of Karnataka state. It is 9 km (5.6 mi) away from the Karnataka-Kerala state border. It is popularly known as the University Town owing to its student population and universities. The stretch from Thokottu junction to Konaje is known as the Medical corridor road due to the presence of many premium educational institutions and healthcare facilities. It is close to Mangalore University, Konaje, Mudipu Infosys, Soorya Infratech Park, Thokottu and Ullal. Ullal beach, Someshwar Beach, Pilikula Nisargadhama are some of the nearest tourist destinations. This locality houses the NITTE University, Yenepoya University, Father Muller Charitable Institutions, Fathers Mullers Homeopathic Medical college Hospital and Mangalore Group of Institutions and Hospital. It is a largest University locality in Mangalore (after Manipal university in Udupi district) in terms of students from all over the country and other parts of the world.

== Institutions of higher education ==
- Yenepoya University
- Nitte University
- Father Muller Homeopathic Medical College
- Mangalore Group of Institutions

== Major hospitals ==
- Yenepoya Medical College Hospital
- K S Hegde Charitable Hospital
- Father Muller Homeopathic Medical College Hospital
- Yenepoya Dental College and Hospital
- AB Shetty Memorial Dental College and Hospital
- Kanachur Hospital & Research Centre

== Accessibility ==
Deralakatte is well connected by various city buses from all parts of the city. Direct buses are available to State Bank, Kankanady, Ullal, Surathkal, Mangalore Central railway station, Mangalore University, Infosys DC at Mudipu, Kasargod (in Kerala) and other major destinations of Mangalore.

Distance from nearby railway stations:

- Ullal railway station, Ullal, Mangalore - 6 km
- Mangalore Central railway station, Hampankatta, Mangalore - 12 km
- Mangalore Junction railway station, Padil, Mangalore - 12 km
- Surathkal railway station, Surathkal, Mangalore - 27 km

Distance from Nearest Airport:

- Mangalore International Airport (India) - 23 km

== See also ==
- Aloyseum
- Bejai Museum
- Kadri Park
- NITK Beach
- Panambur Beach
- Pilikula Nisargadhama
- Sasihithlu Beach
- Someshwar Beach
- St. Aloysius Chapel
- Tagore Park
- Tannirbhavi Beach
- Ullal beach

== Gallery ==
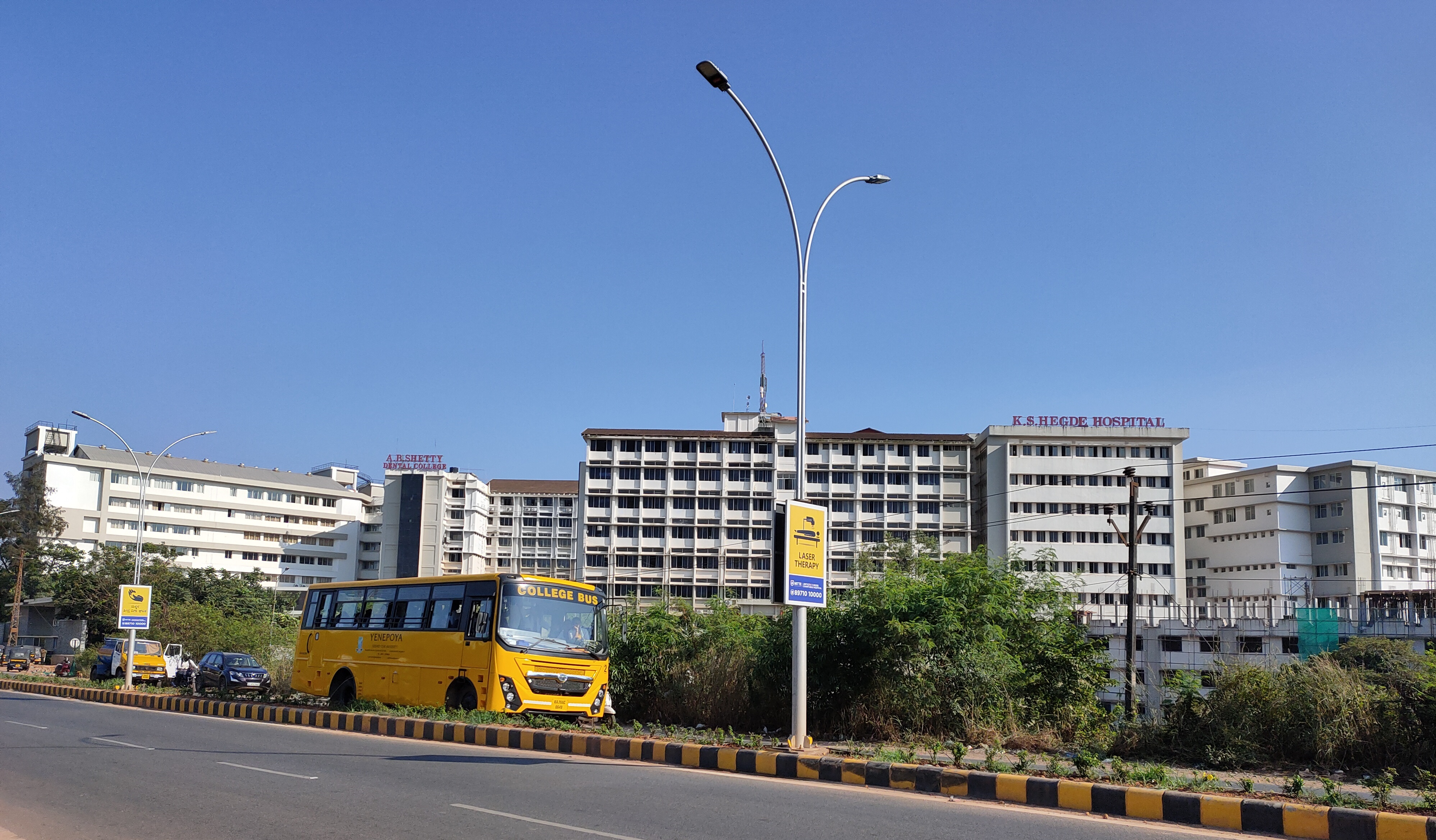
AB Shetty Dental College & KS Hegde Hospital, Deralakatte, Mangalore

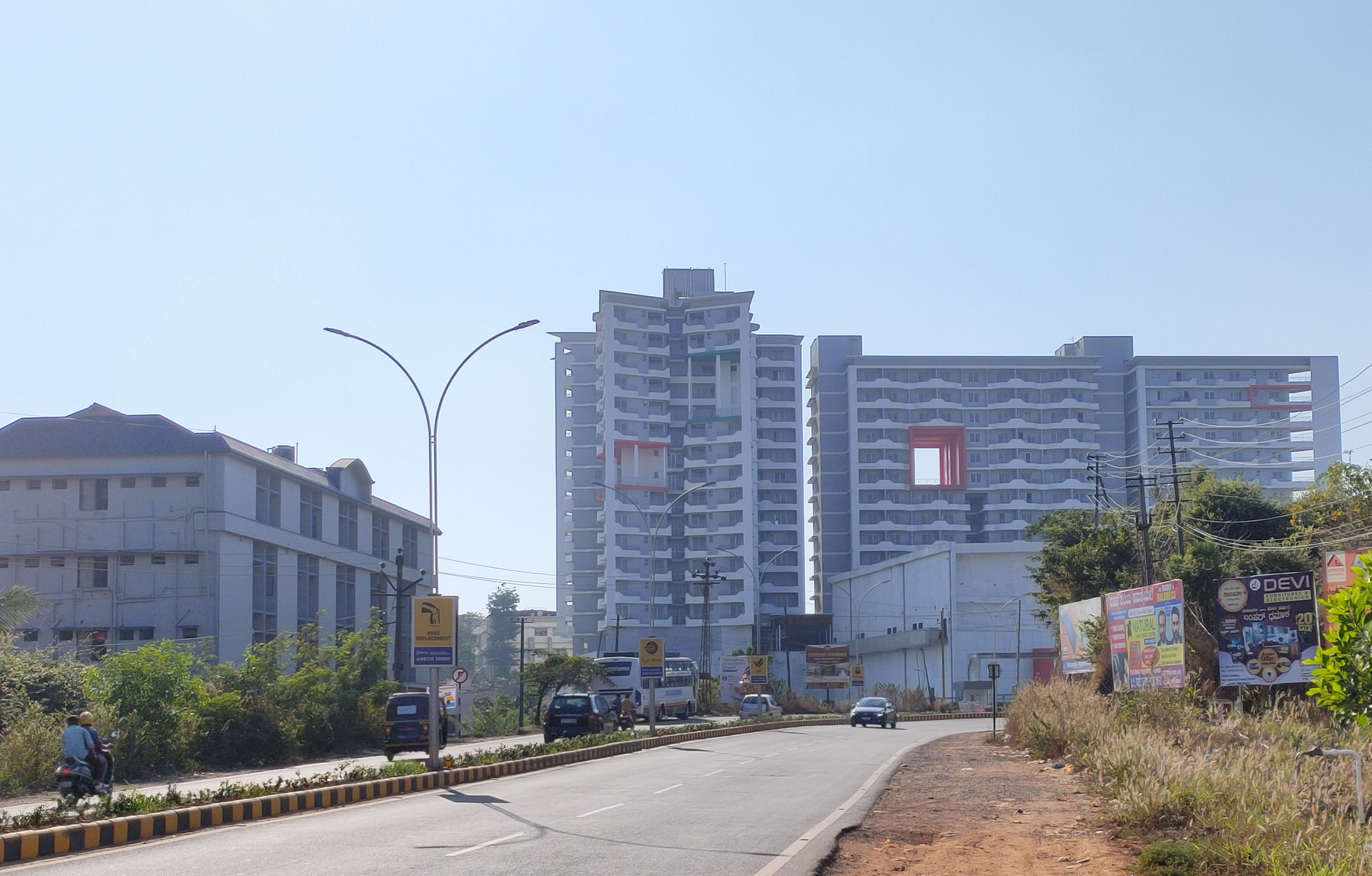
A view of highrise Beary's buildings at Deralakatte, Mangalore

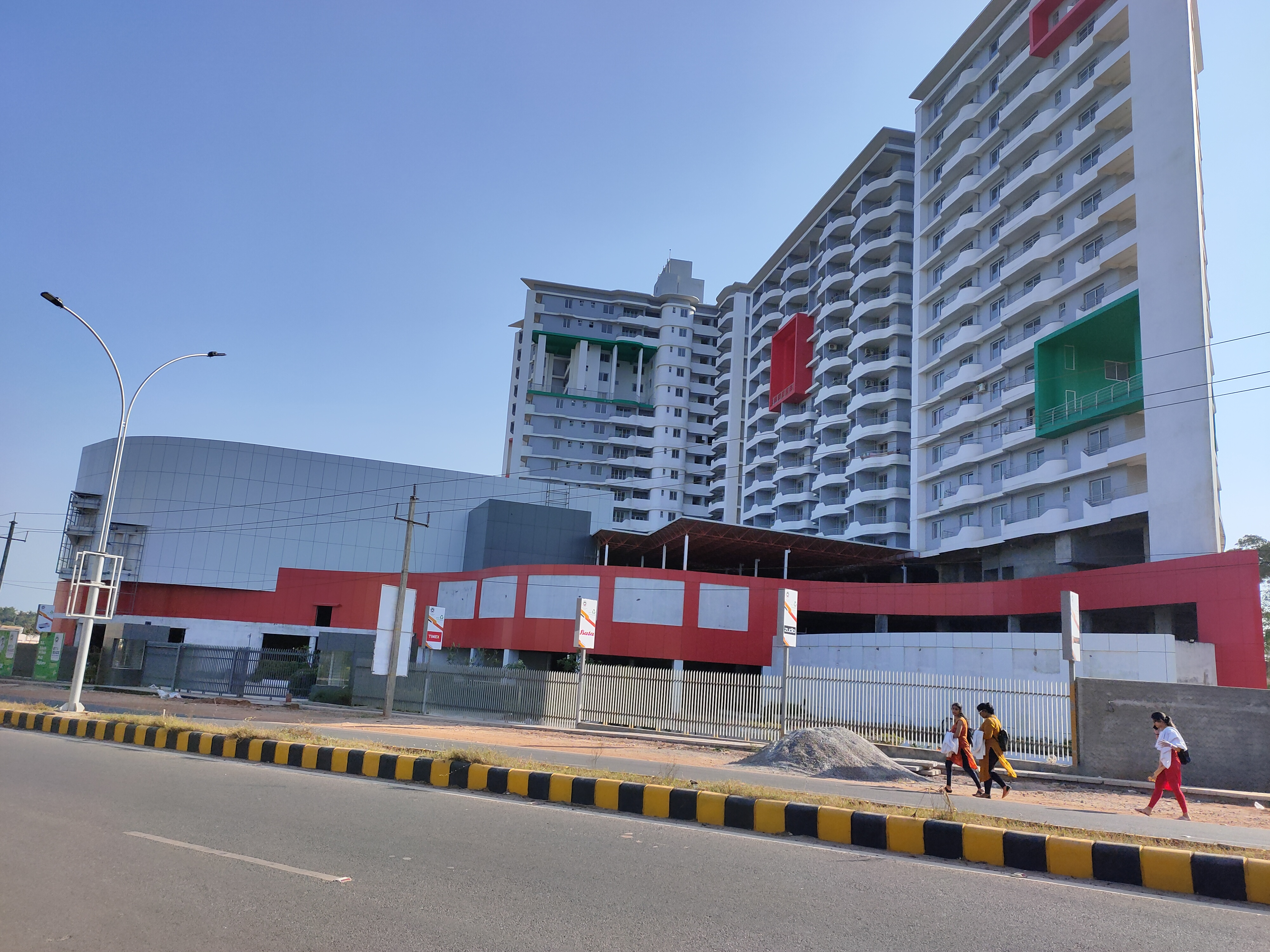
Beary's Turning Point Mall, Deralakatte, Mangalore

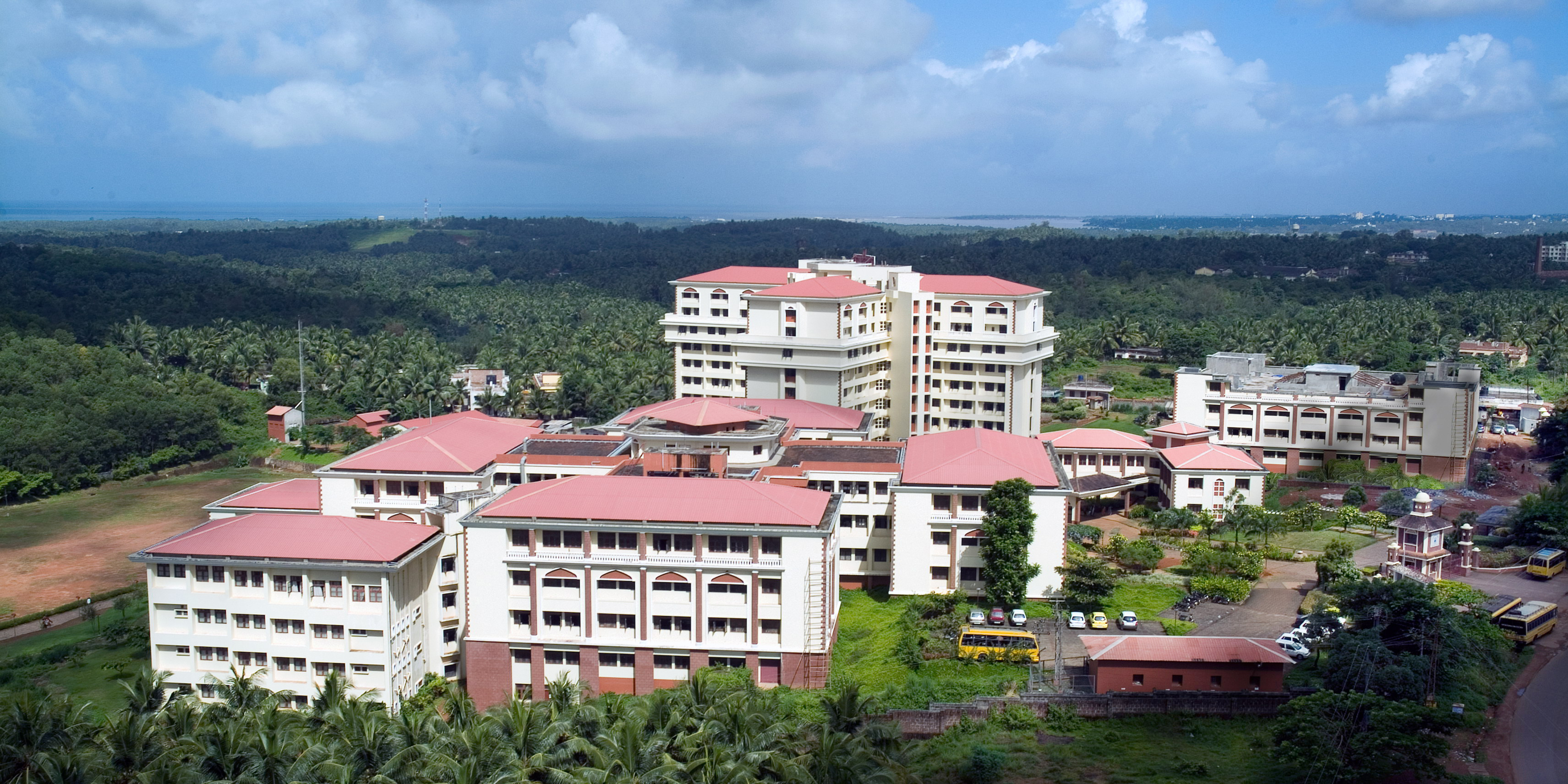
Aerial view of the Yenepoya (deemed to be University campus) at Deralakatte
