= Ullal beach =

Ullal Beach
- Beach
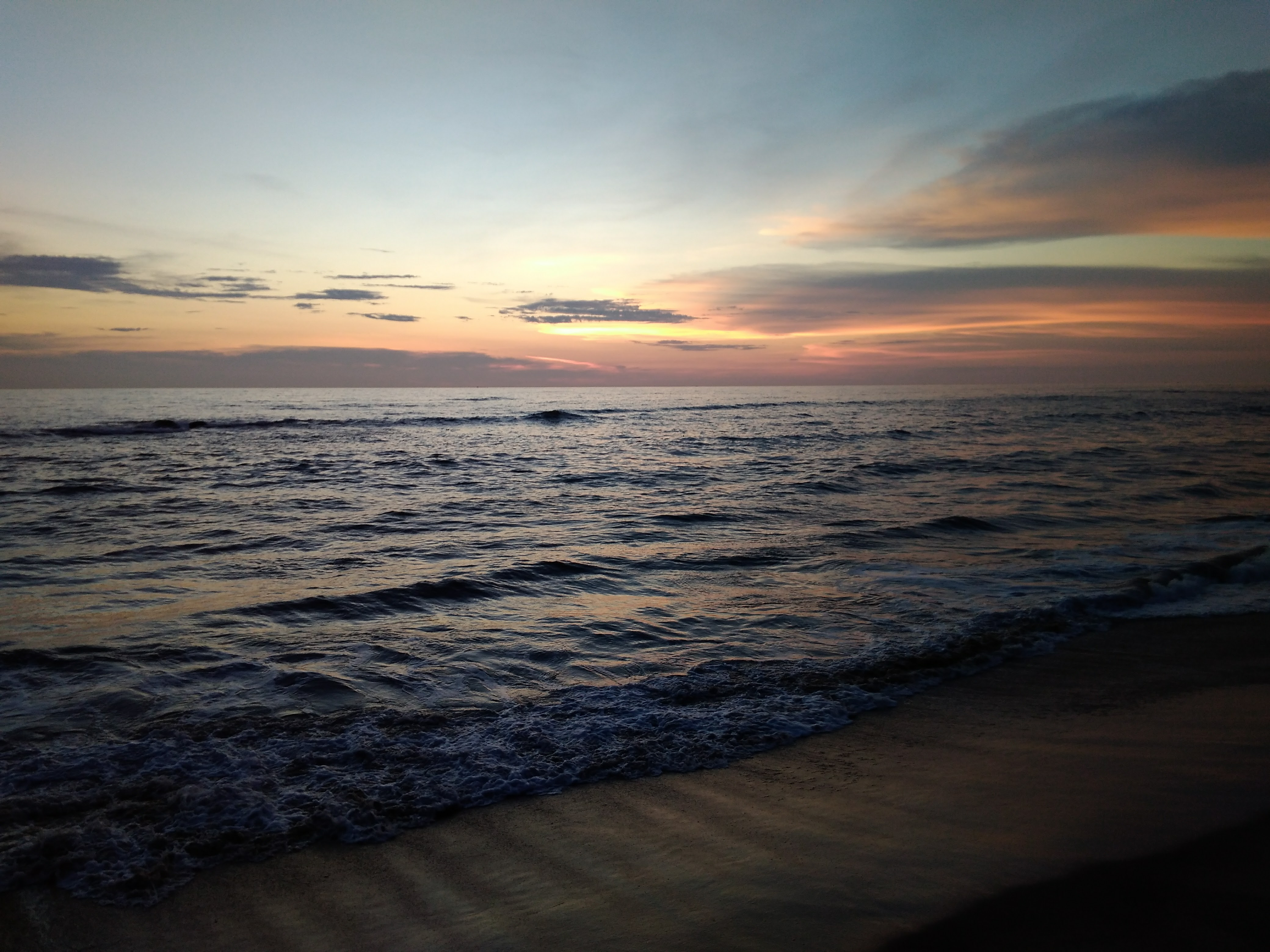
- Location: Ullal
- City: Mangaluru
- Country: India
- Activities: Swimming

Government
  - Body: Ullal City Municipal

Ullal Beach is situated on the southwestern seaboard of the Indian sub-continent, adjacent to Ullal town, 10 km south of the city of Mangaluru, Karnataka, India. Attractions are its picturesque stretch of Coconut trees, fishermen's lane, the ruined fort of Abbakka Devi and 16th century Jain temples. A resort is also situated nearby.

The Dargah of Sayed Mohammed Shereful Madani, who is said to have come to Ullal from Madina 400 years ago, is a famous dargah located nearby.

== Accessibility ==
Ullal Beach is well connected by public transport. Ullal bus Station can be reached from Thokkottu on the National Highway 66, provides convenient access to the beach. There are many city buses from statebank, Kankanady, Deralakatte and other parts of Mangaluru city. The beach is very close to Ullal bus station and accessible by walk.

== Climate ==
Mangalore has a tropical monsoon climate and is under the direct influence of the Arabian Sea branch of the southwest monsoon.

== See also ==
- NITK Beach
- Panambur Beach
- Tannirbhavi Beach
- Sasihithlu Beach
- Someshwar Beach
- Pilikula Nisargadhama
- Kadri Park
- Tagore Park
- St. Aloysius Chapel
