= Tagore Park =

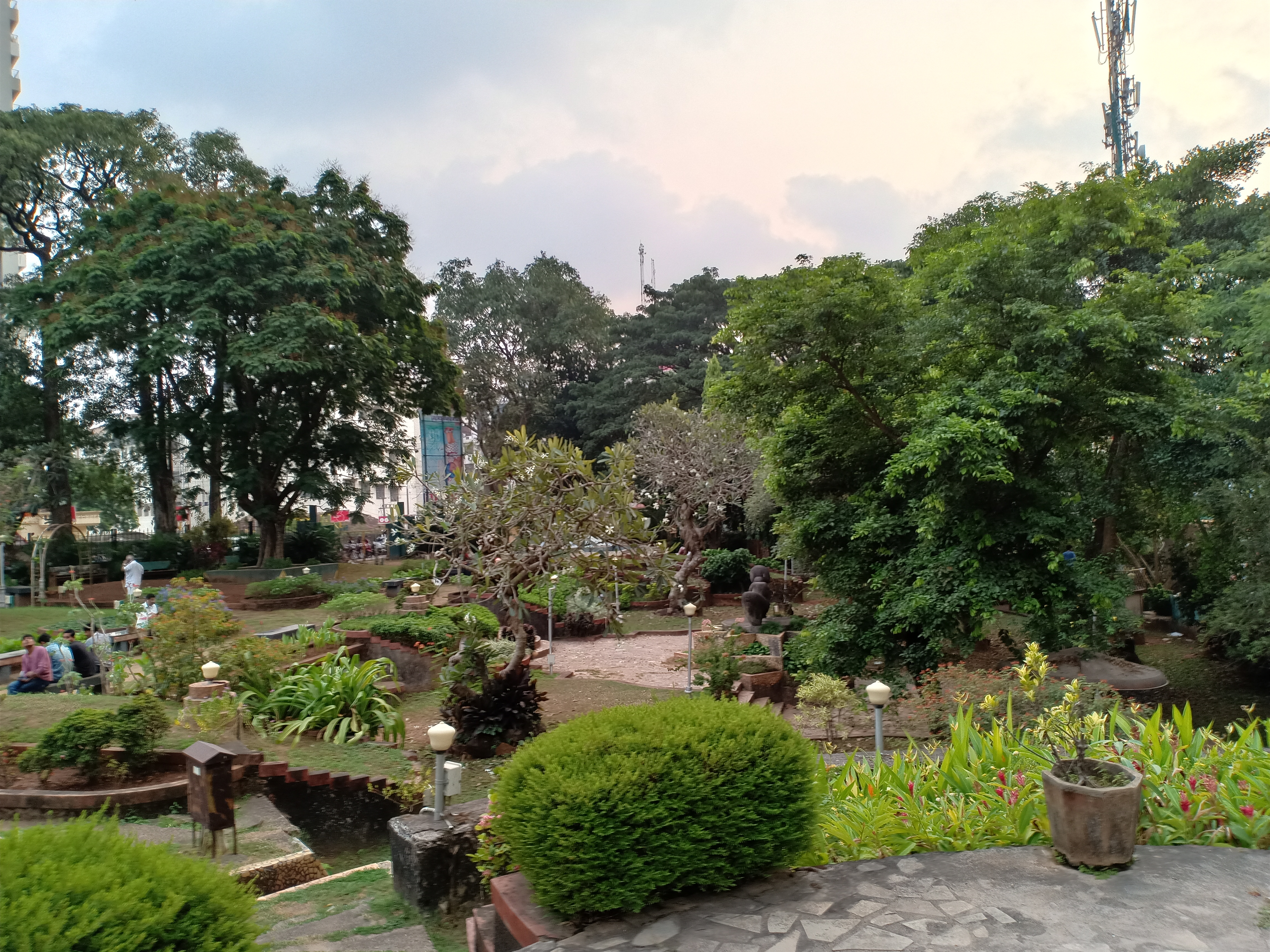
- Tagore Park in Mangaluru

- Location at Mangaluru
- Coordinates: 12°50′23″N 74°47′28″E
- Country: India
- State: Karnataka
- District: Dakshina Kannada
- City: Mangaluru

Government
  - Body: Mangaluru City Corporation

Tagore Park is a recreation park situated in Mangaluru in the state of Karnataka in India. It contains a lighthouse, with a height of 33 feet built in the year 1900. The lighthouse carries an acetylene light. It is located adjacent to Light house hill (LHH) road, one of the busiest roads in the city.

== Gallery ==
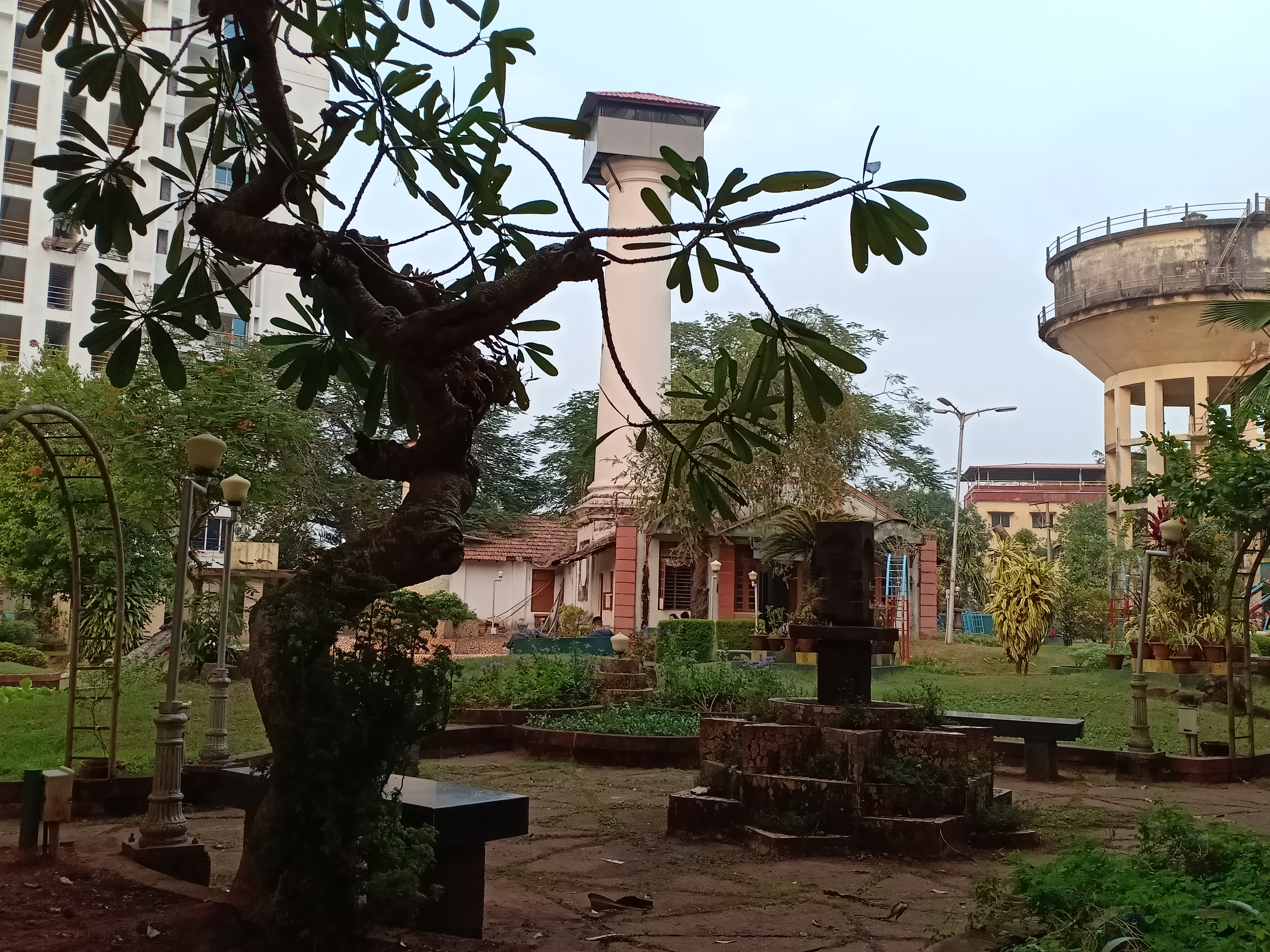
Lighthouse inside Tagore Park in Mangaluru

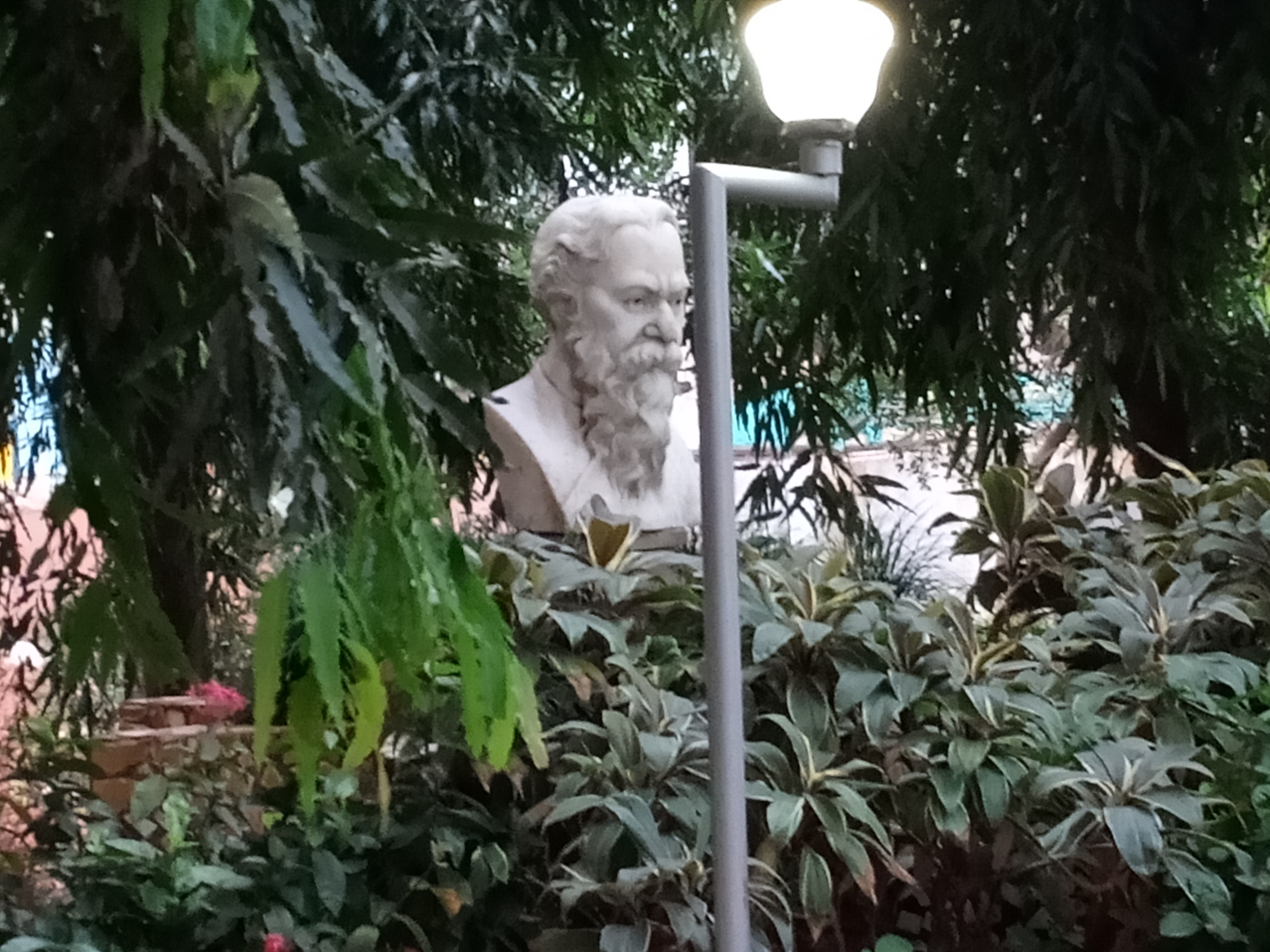
Rabindranath Tagore sculpture at Tagore Park in Mangaluru

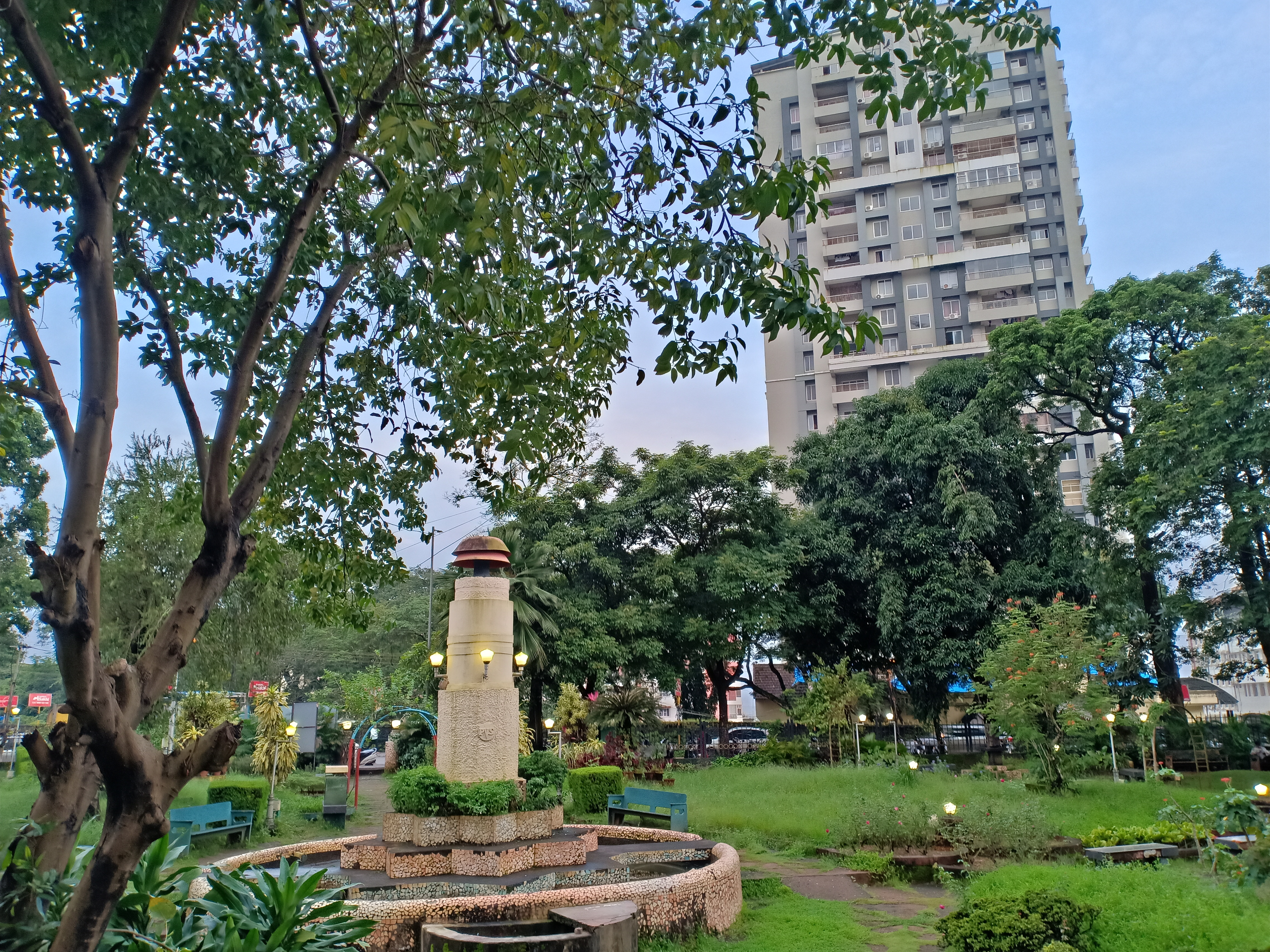
Building behind the Tagore Park in Mangaluru

== See also ==
- Balmatta
- Mahatma Gandhi Road (Mangalore)
- K S Rao Road
- NITK Beach
- Panambur Beach
- Tannirbhavi Beach
- Ullal beach
- Someshwar Beach
- Sasihithlu Beach
- Kadri Park
- St. Aloysius Chapel
- Bejai Museum
- Aloyseum
- Kudla Kudru
