= Kadri Park =

- Park
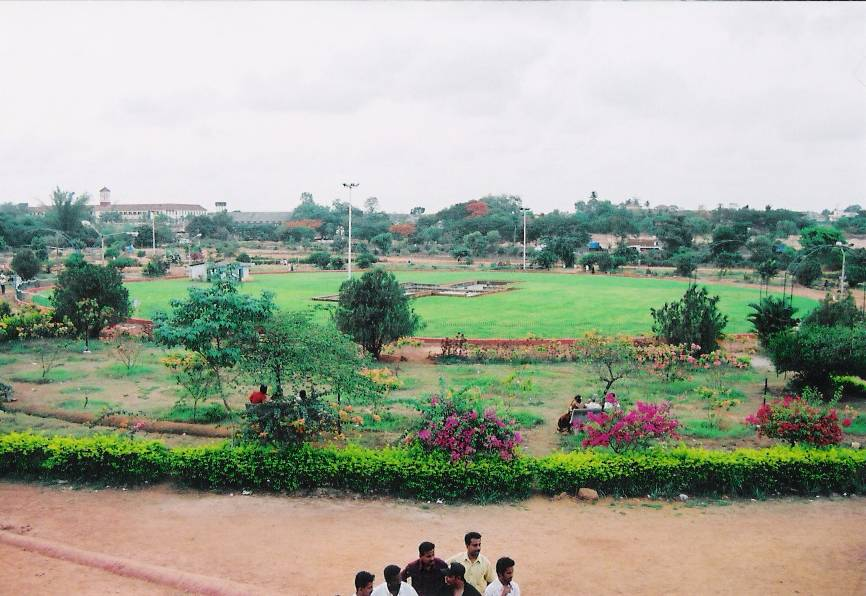
- A view of Kadri Park

- Location at Mangaluru
- Coordinates: 12°53′21″N 74°51′22″E
- Country: India
- State: Karnataka
- District: Dakshina Kannada
- City: Mangaluru

Government
  - Body: Mangaluru City Corporation

Languages
  - Official: Kannada
- Time zone: UTC+5:30 (IST)

Kadri Park is a park located in Kadri Gudde (meaning "hill" in Tulu). It is the largest park in Mangaluru. This park contains a musical fountain and has hosted the Karavali Utsav. The park is famous for flower shows.

== Accessibility ==
Kadri Park is well connected by public transport. There are several city buses from the main bus stop in statebank and from other regions of the city. It is close to KPT Junction (one of the busiest junctions of Mangalore), Circuit House, Planet SKS (the tallest pure residential building of Karnataka) & All India Radio Mangalore.

== Climate ==
Mangaluru has a tropical monsoon climate and is under the direct influence of the Arabian Sea influenced southwest monsoon.

== Gallery ==
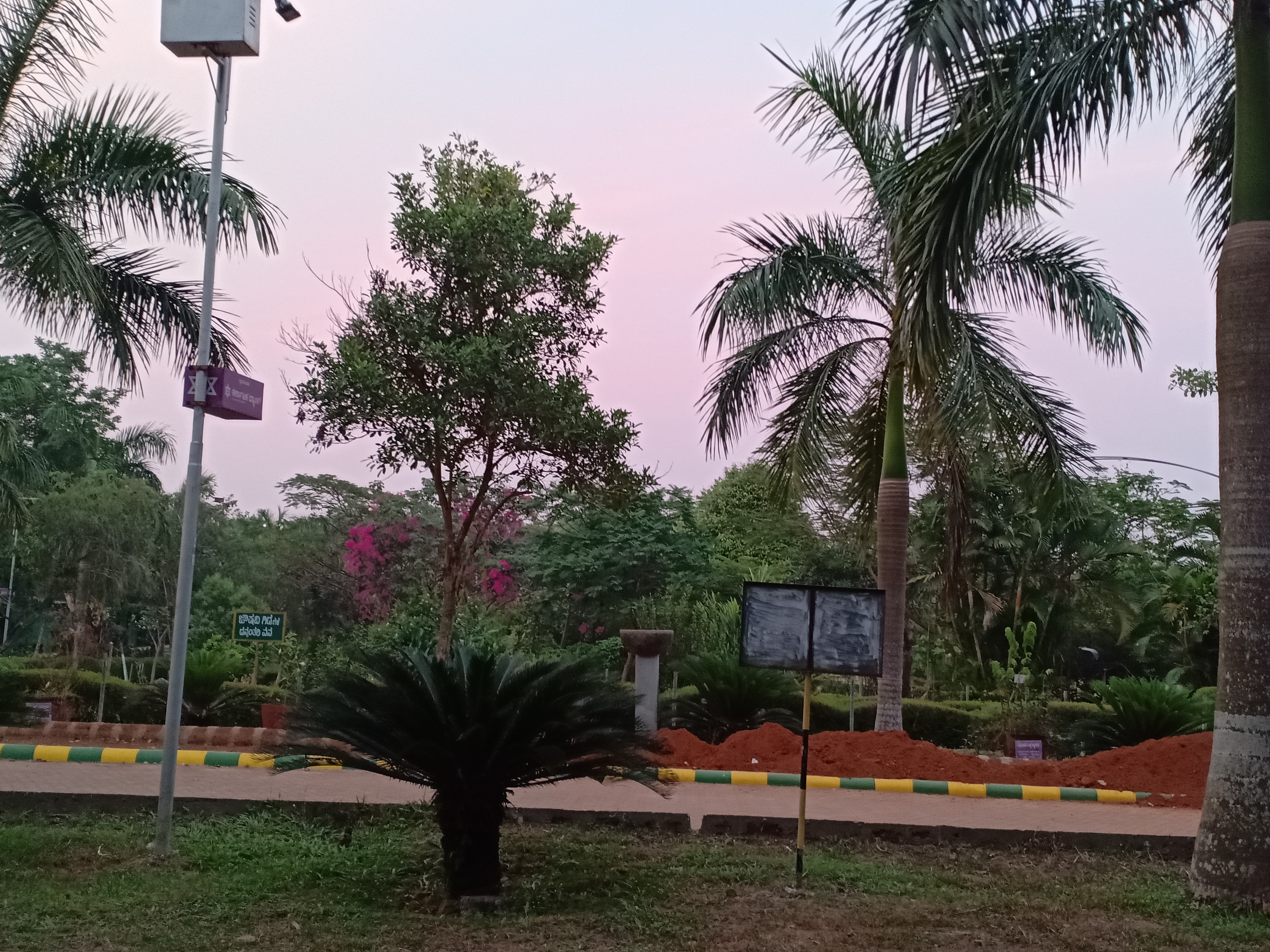
Kadri Park in Mangaluru - 1

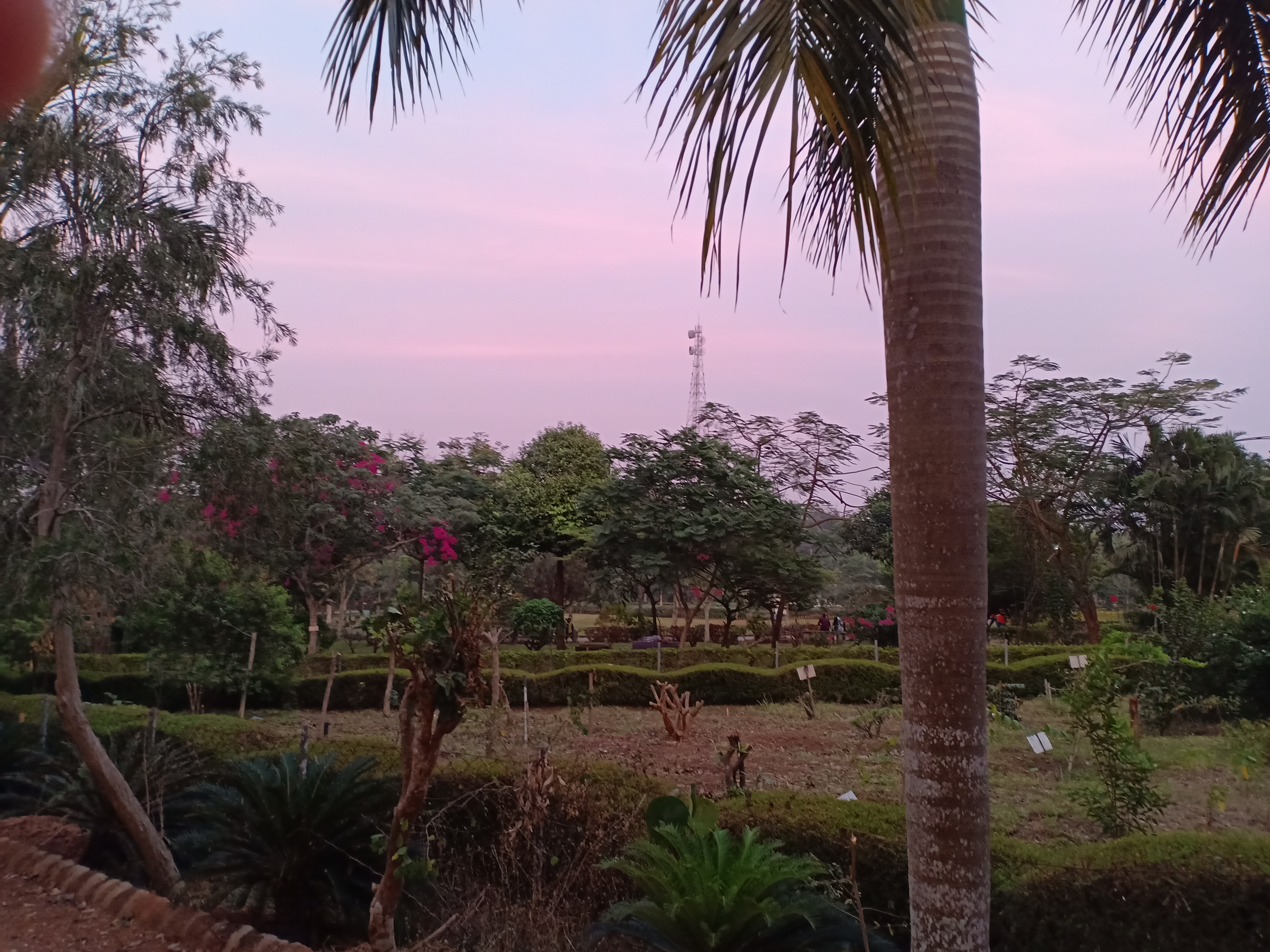
Kadri Park in Mangaluru - 2

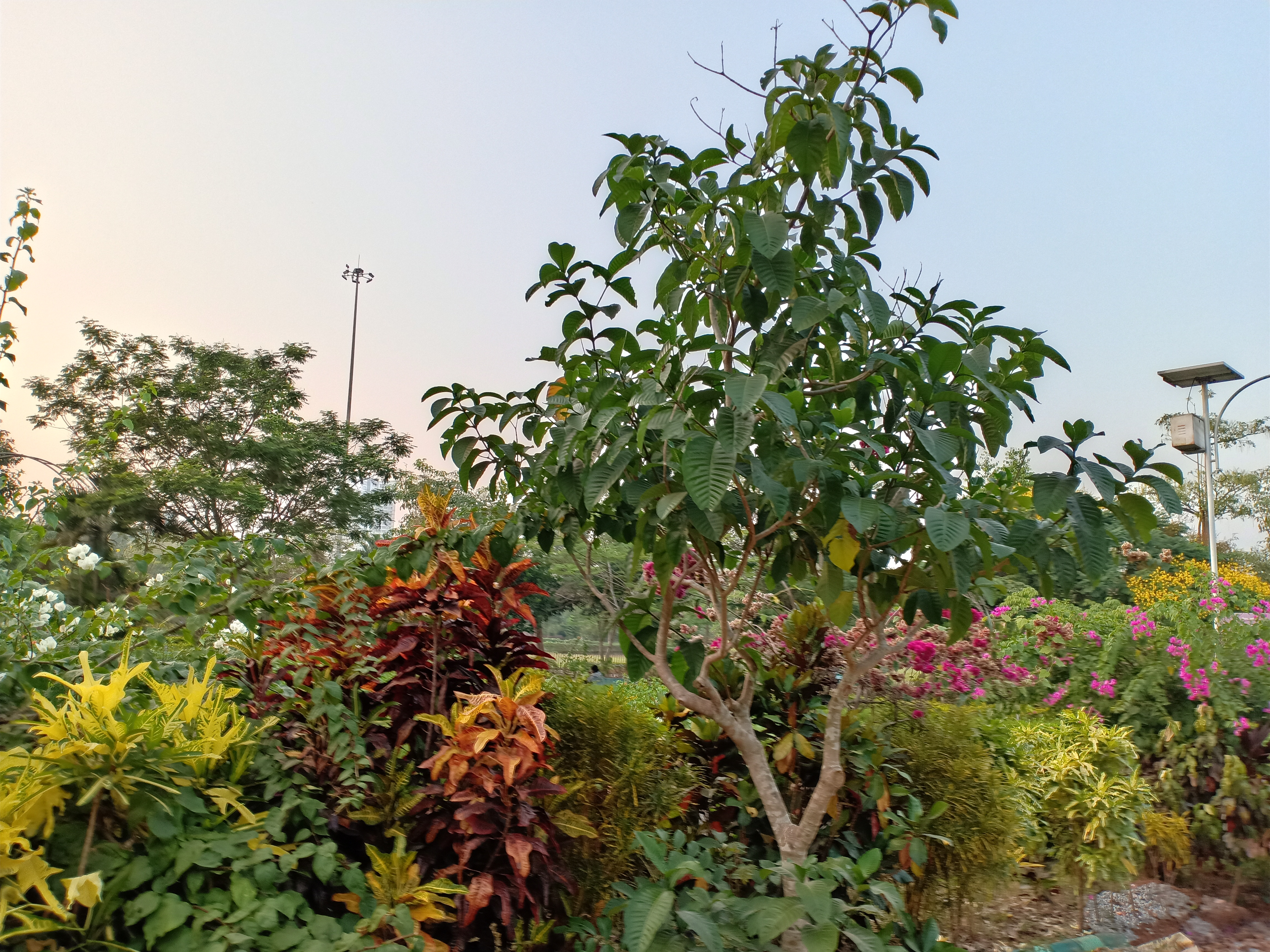
Kadri Park in Mangaluru - 3

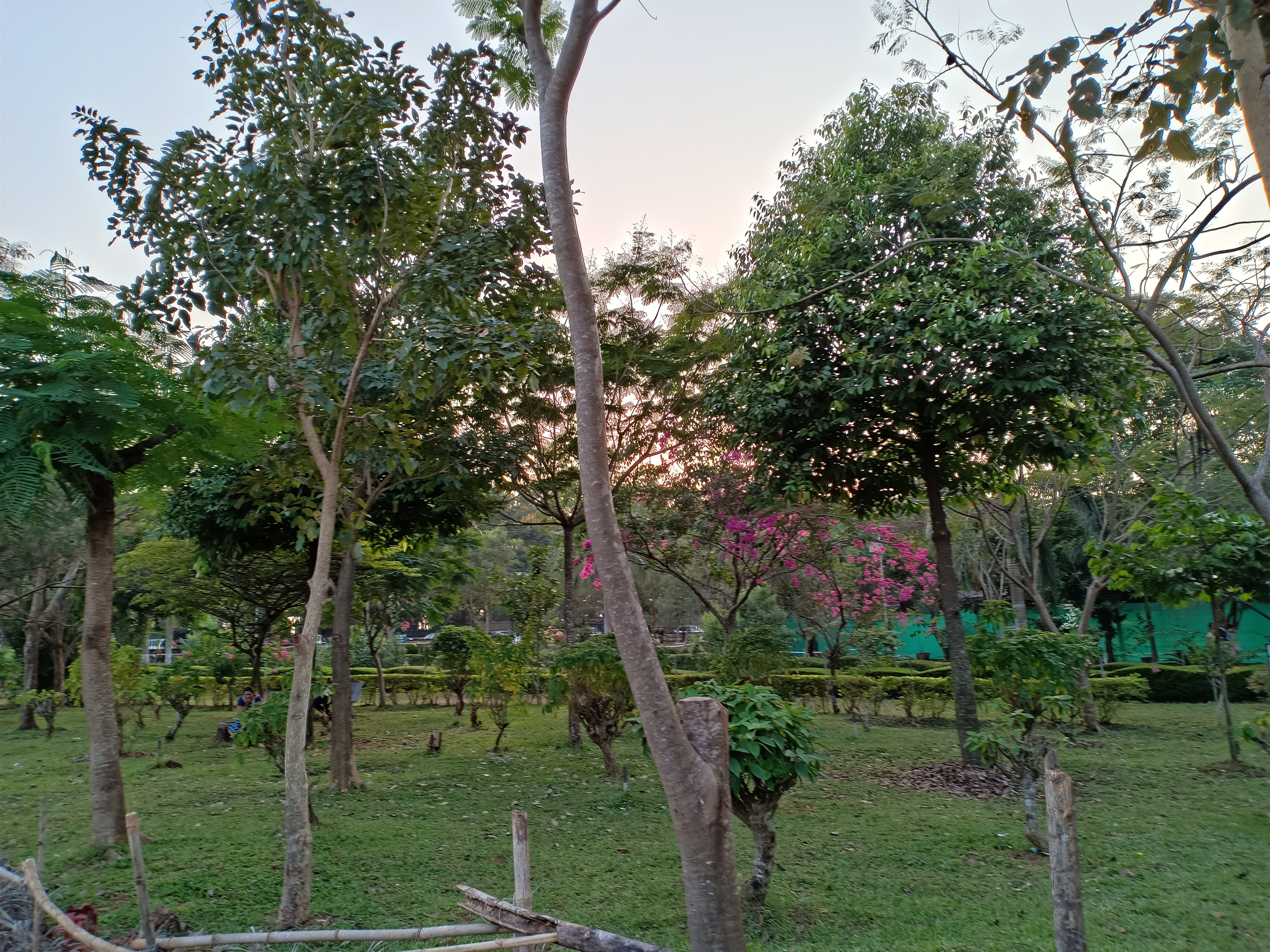
Kadri Park in Mangaluru - 4

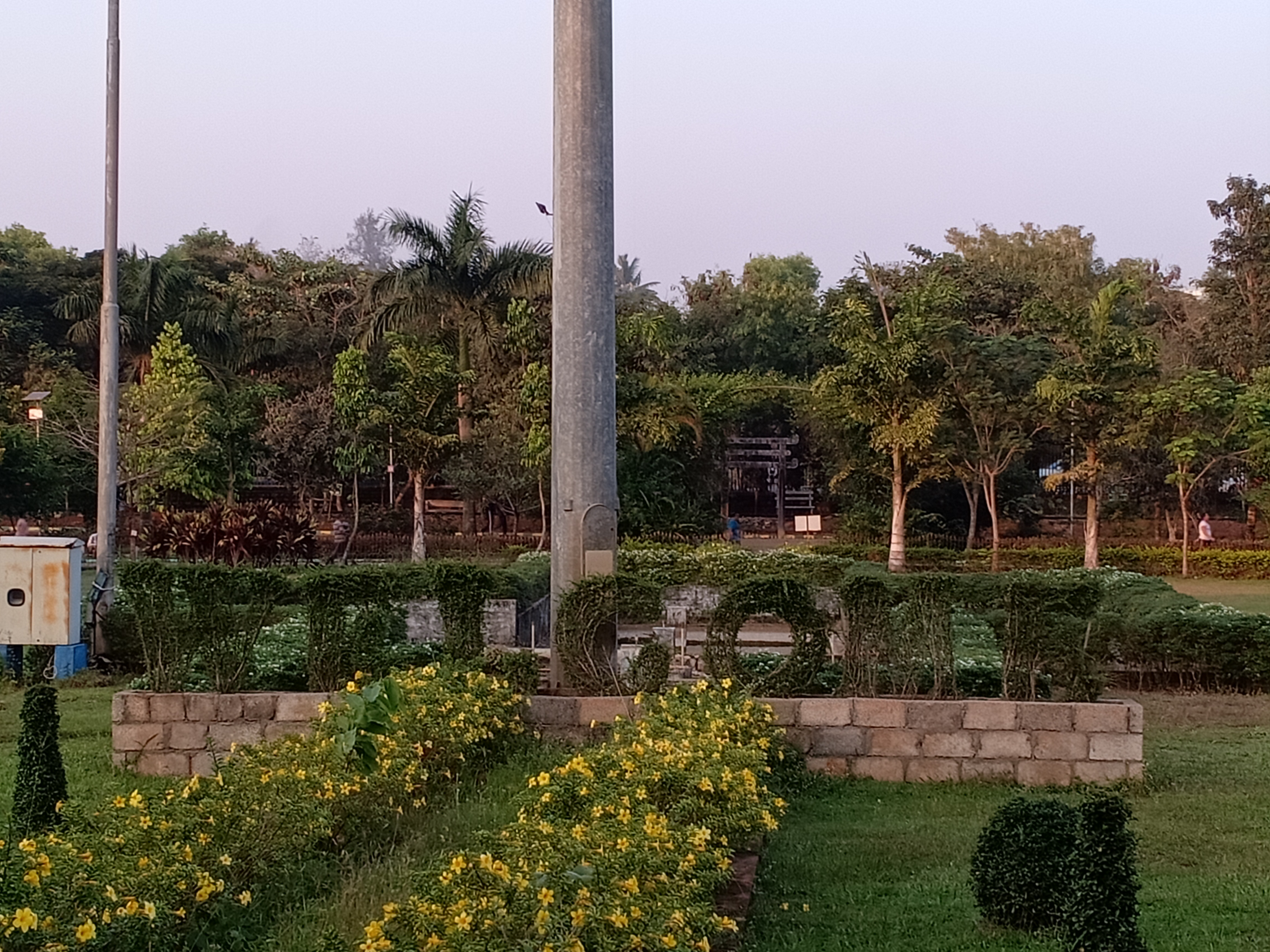
Kadri Park in Mangaluru - WELCOME topiary in the circular garden

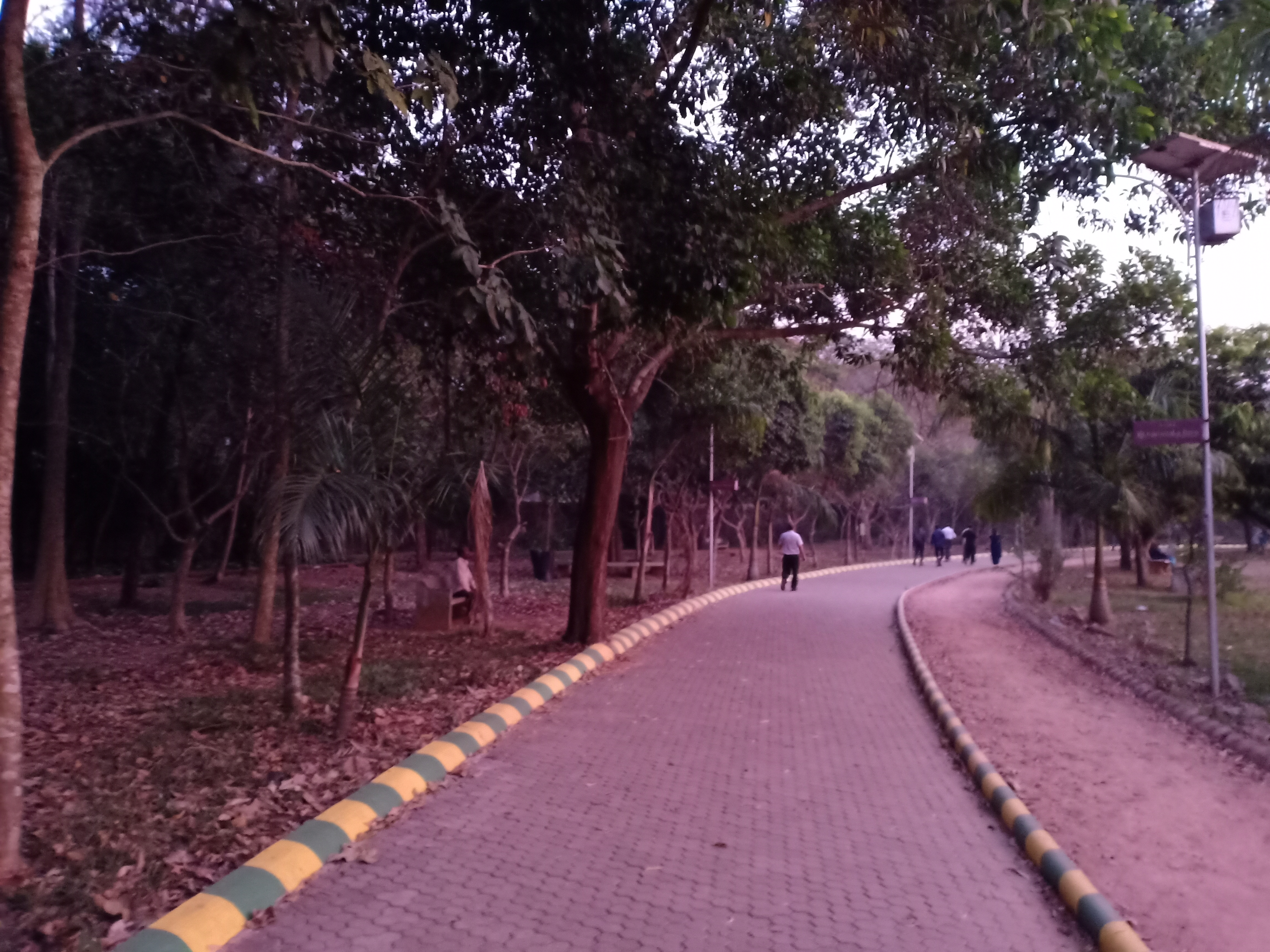
An Alley at Kadri Park in Mangaluru

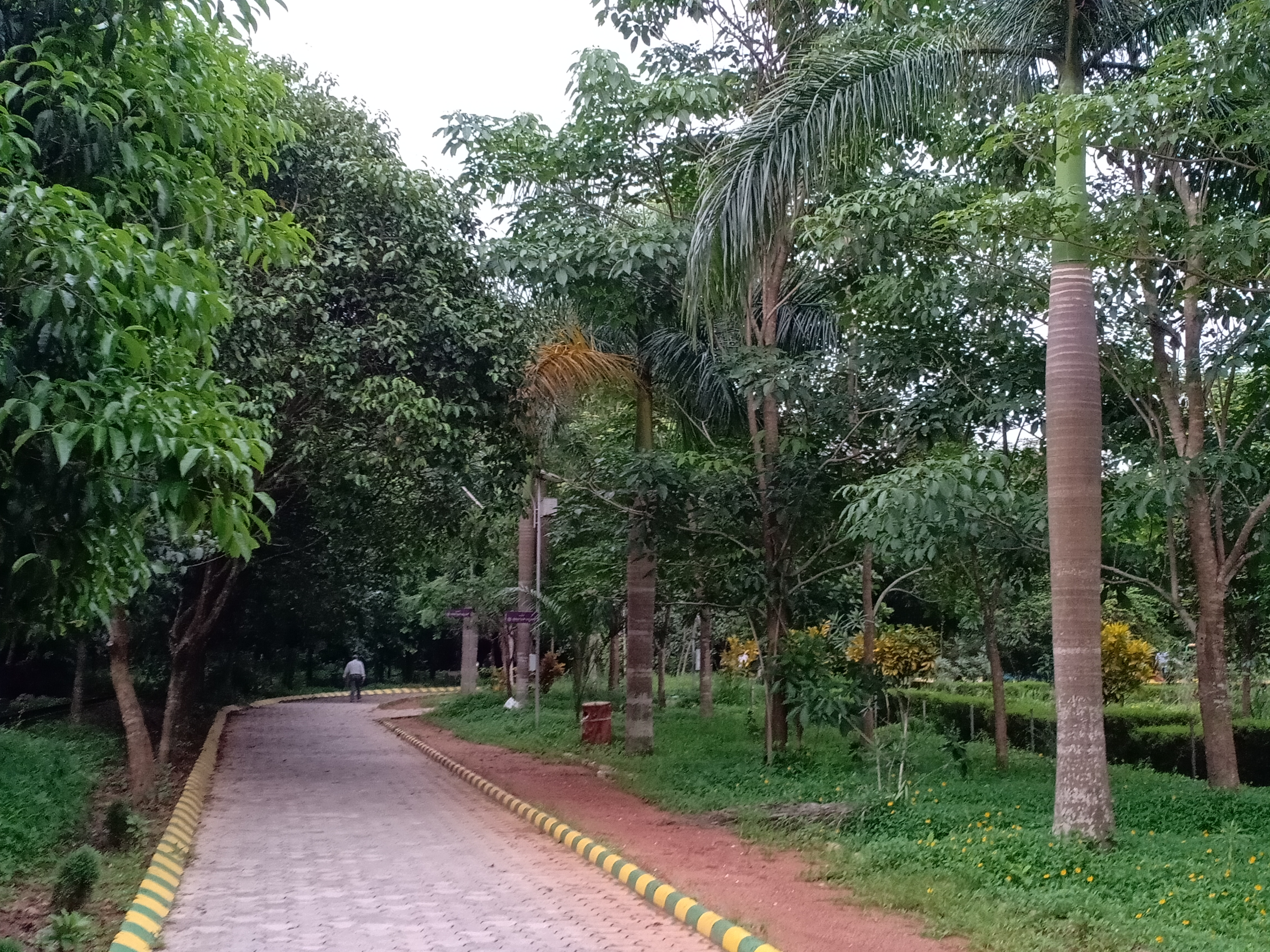
An Alley at Kadri Park in Mangaluru - 2

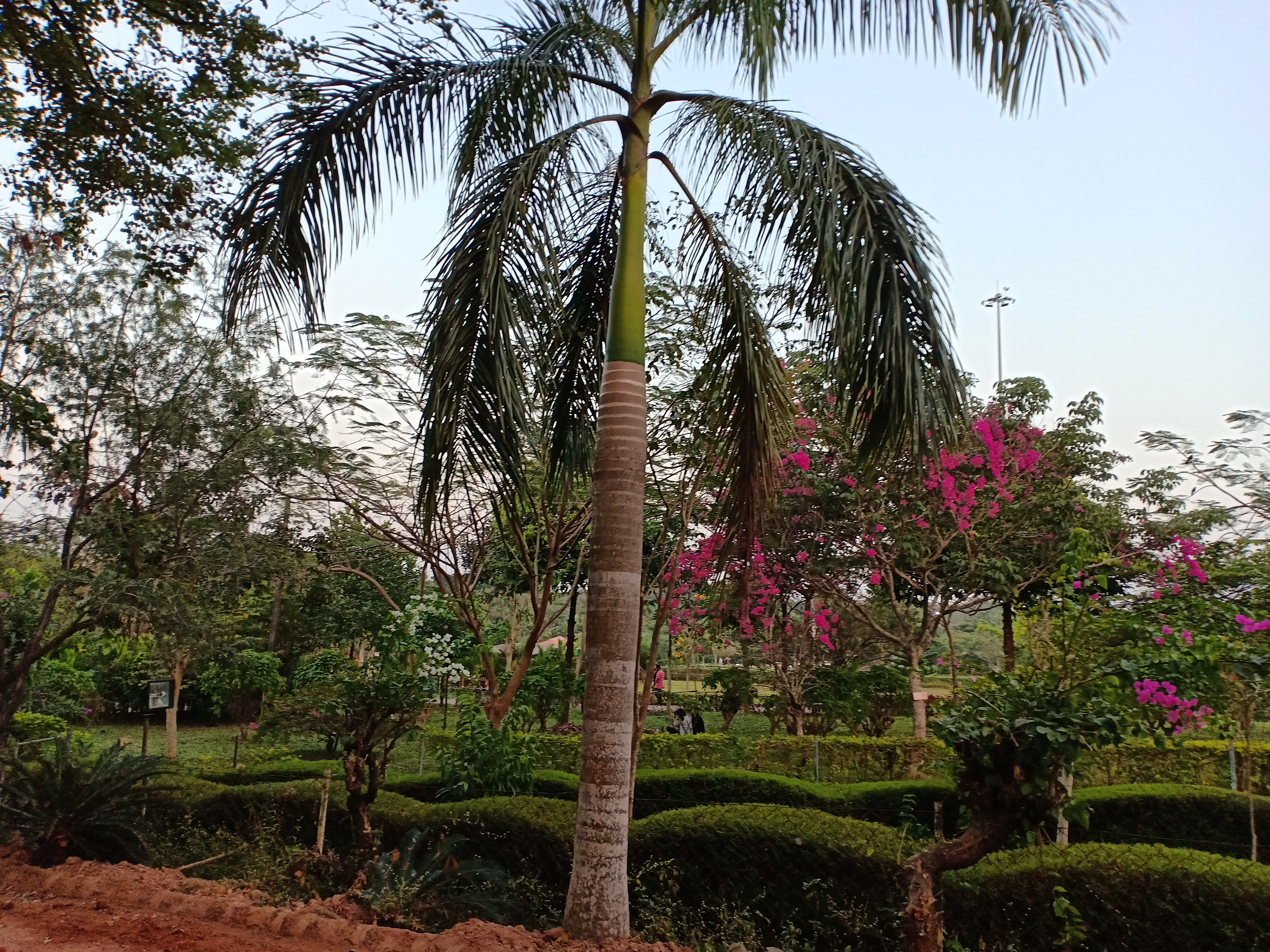
Kadri Park in Mangaluru - Pink Bougainvillea trees and Bamboo palm tree

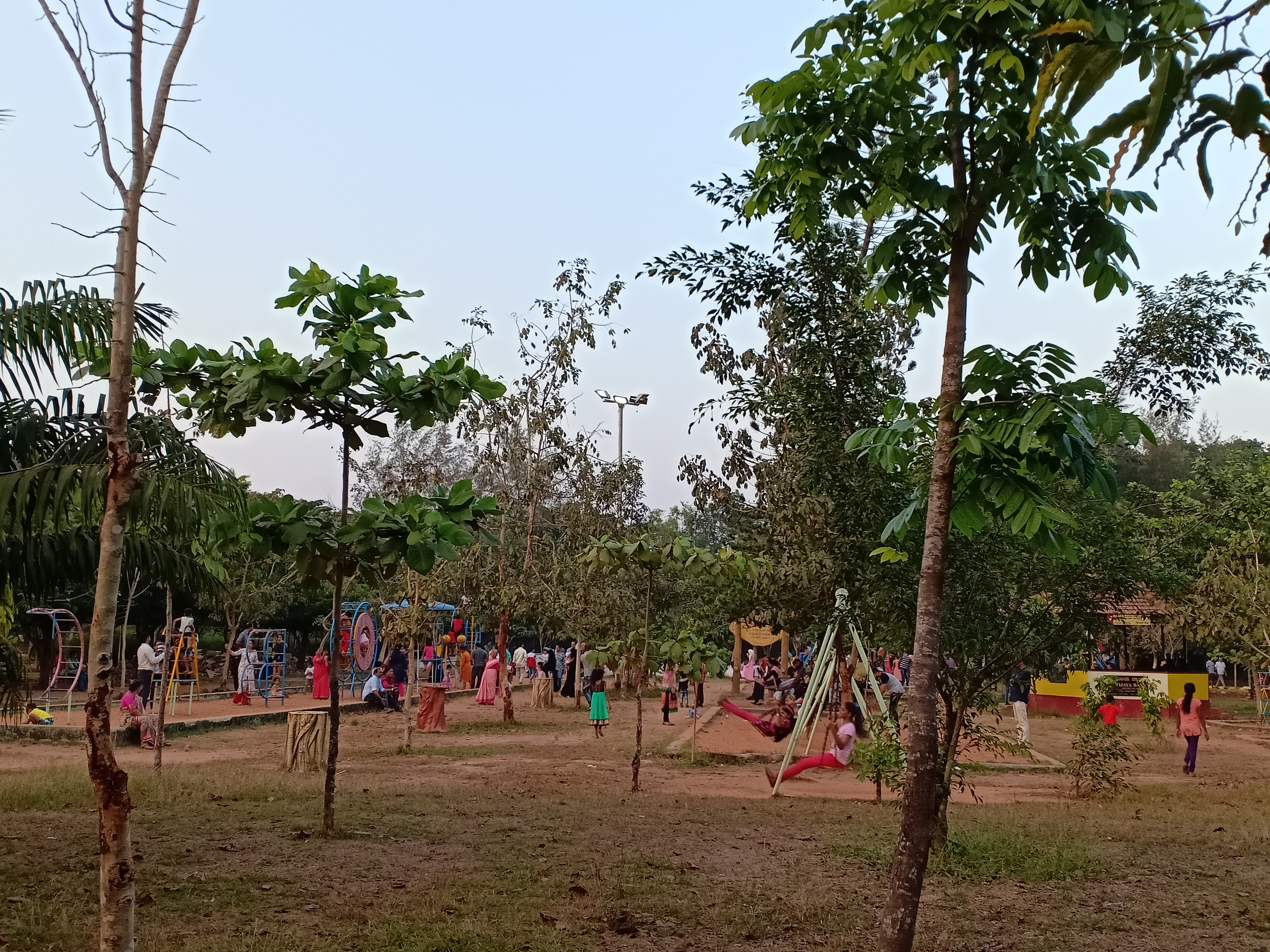
Kadri Park in Mangaluru - Children's play area

Children's train 'Balamangala Express' at Kadri Park in Mangaluru

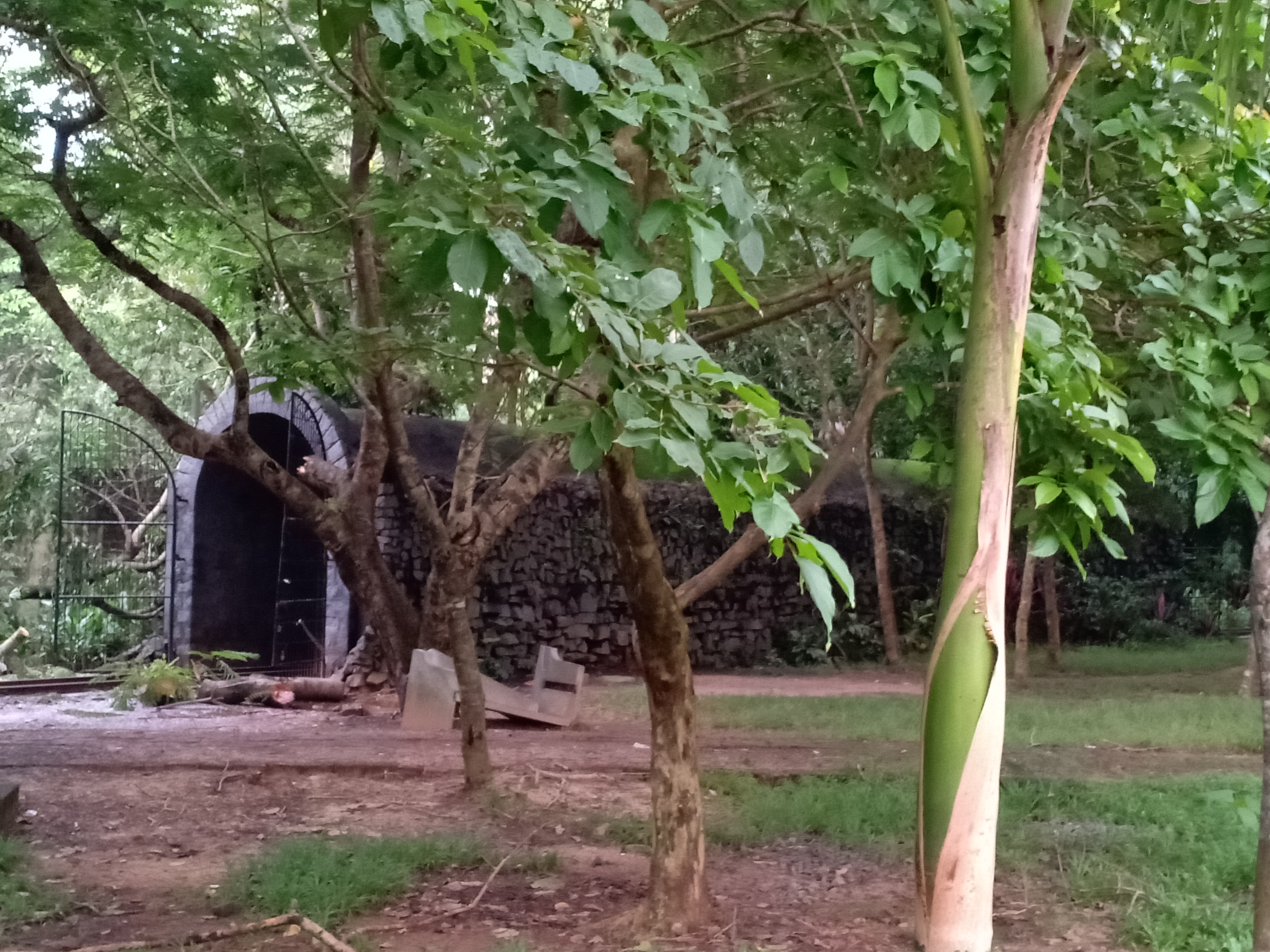
Tunnel for the Children's train at Kadri Park in Mangaluru

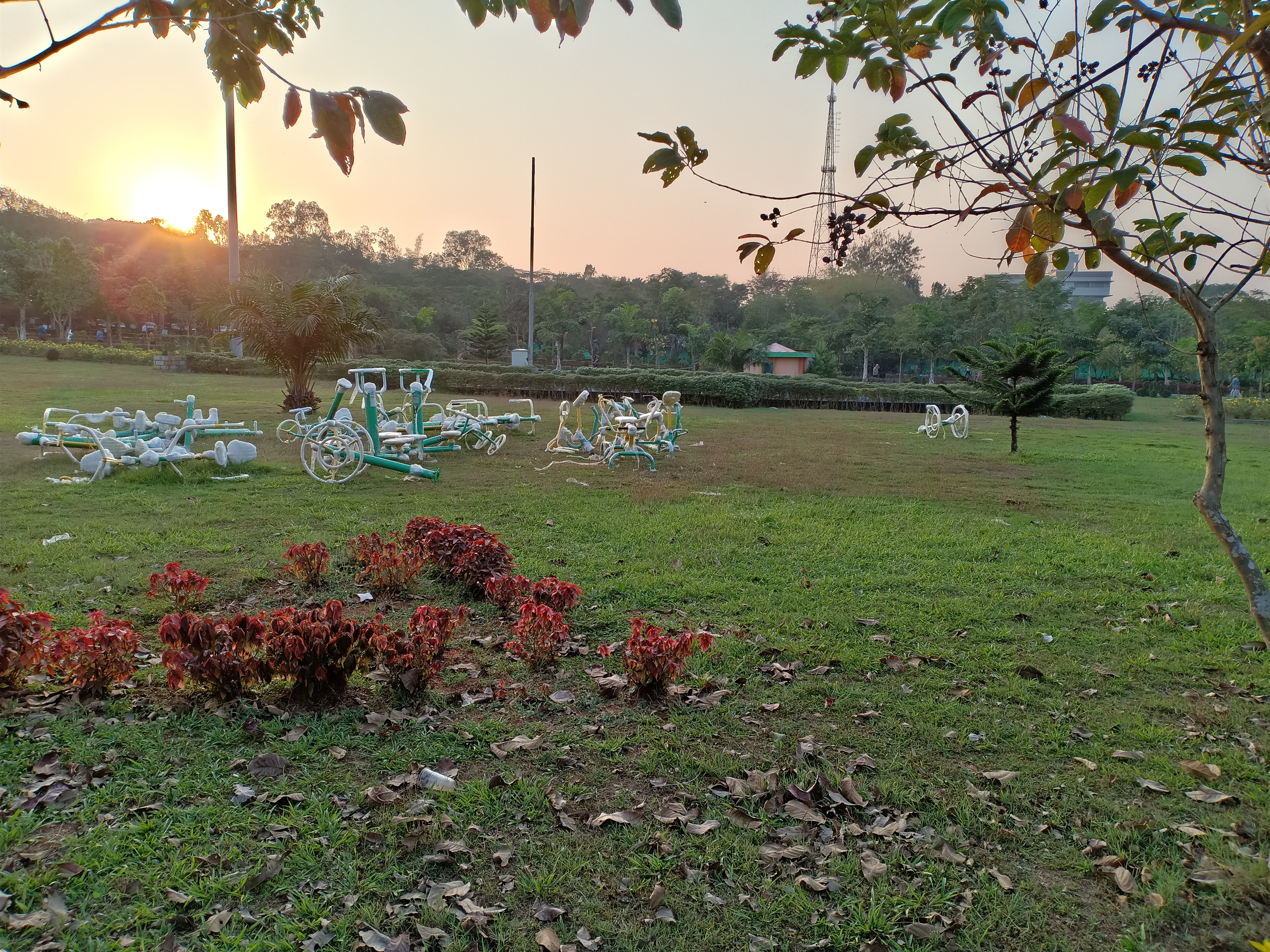
Kadri Park in Mangaluru - Carriages in the circular garden

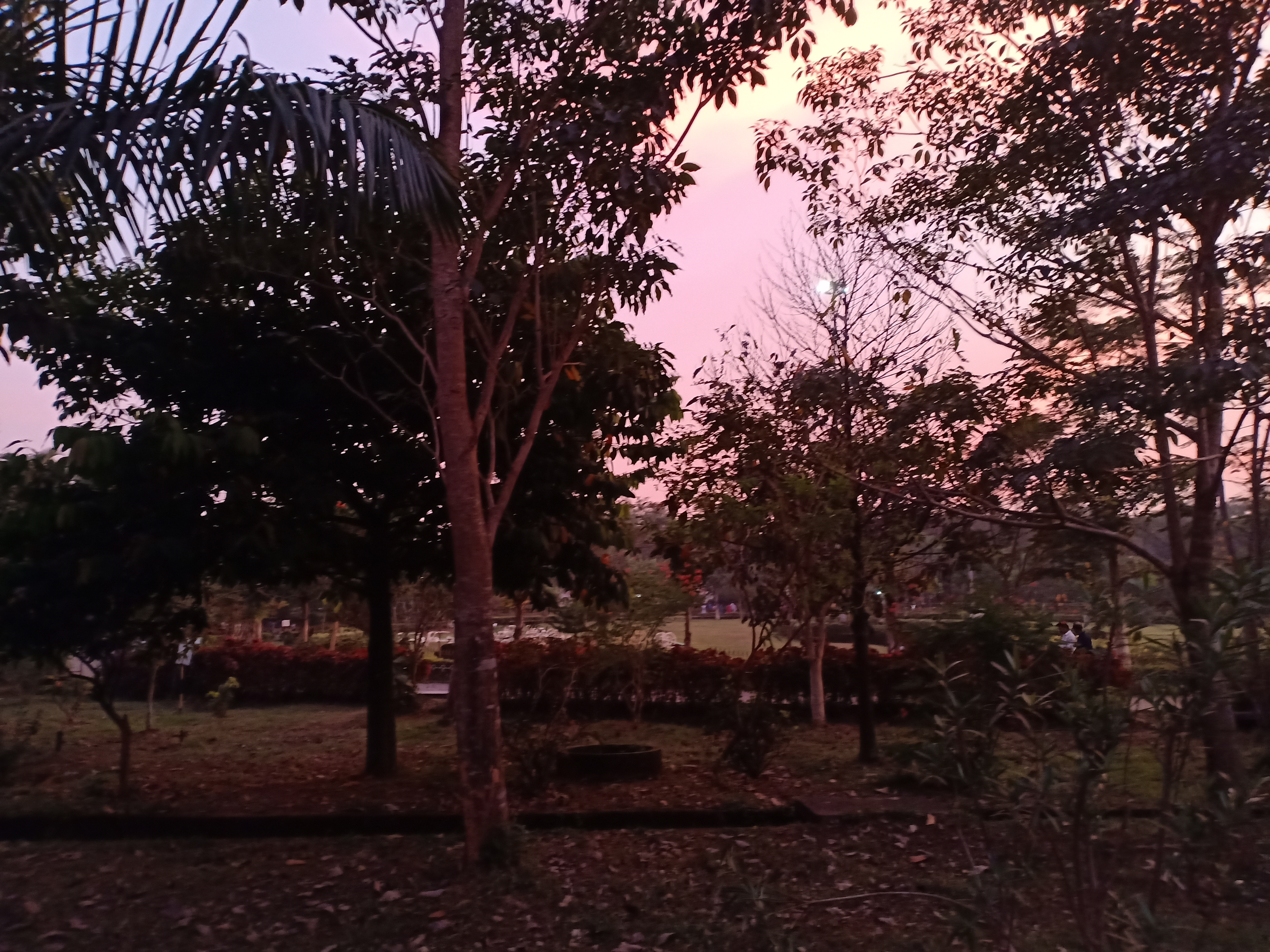
Kadri Park in Mangaluru - Near the circular garden

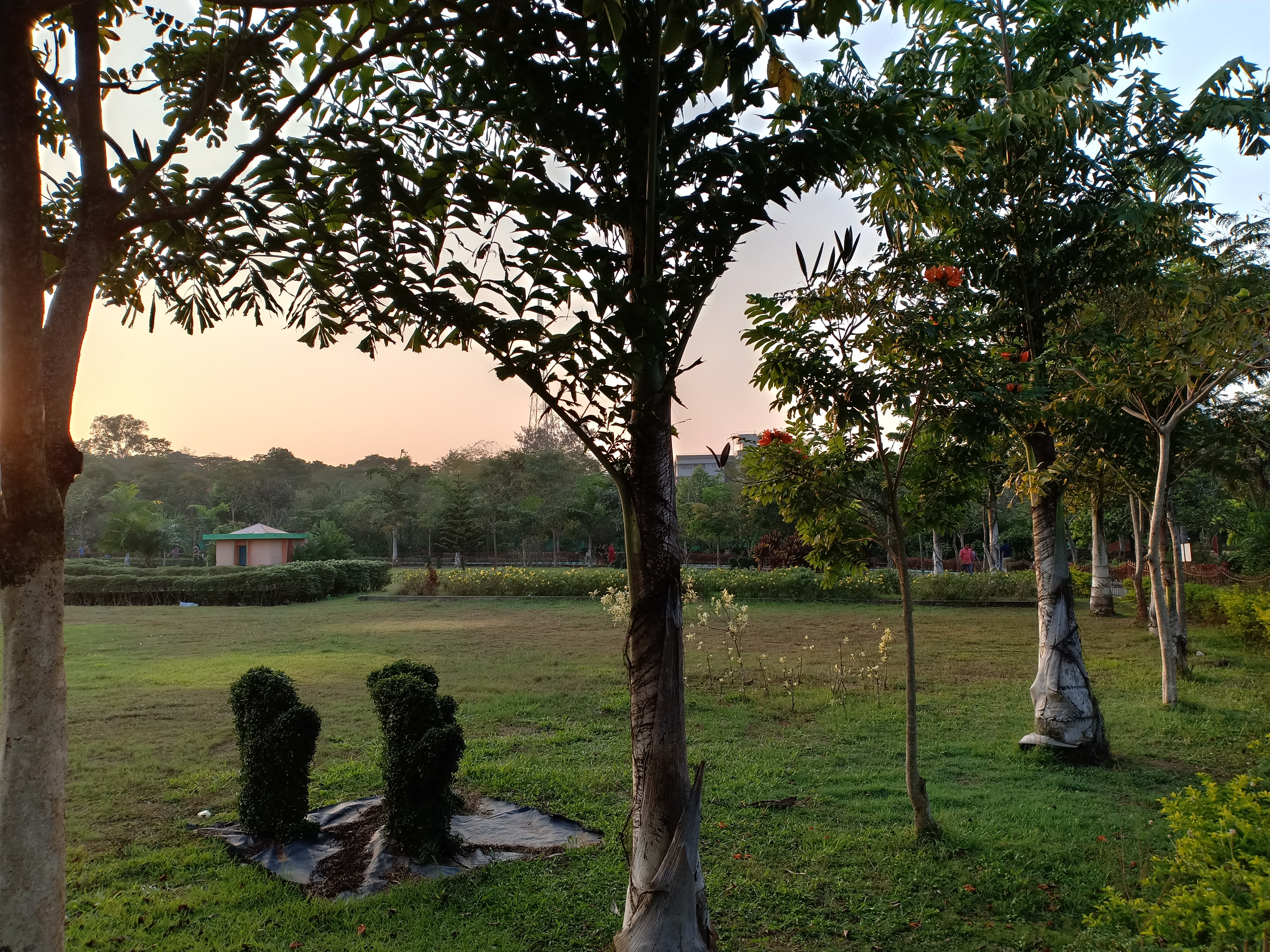
Trees and topiaries in the circular garden of Kadri Park in Mangaluru

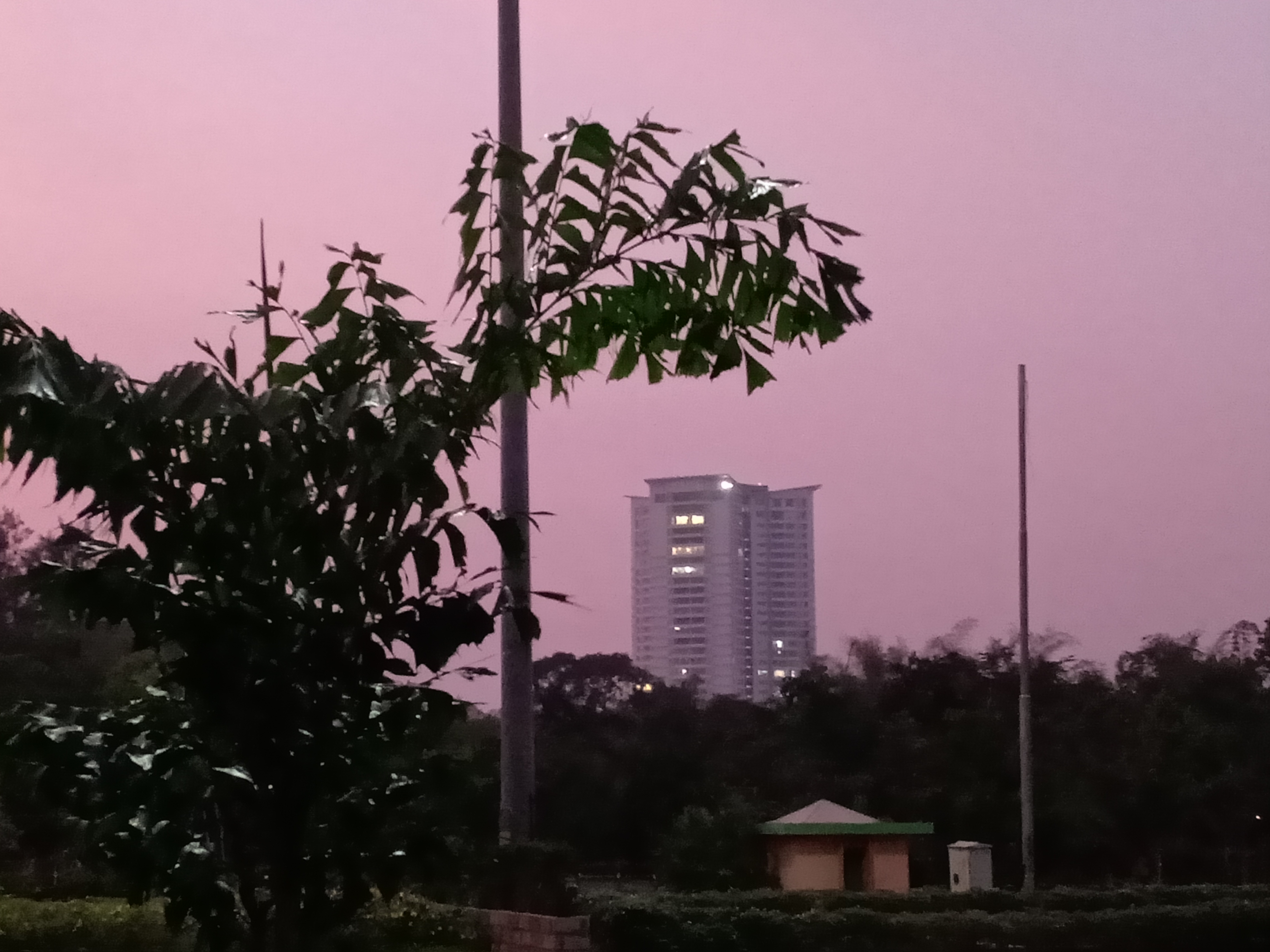
Kadri Park in Mangaluru - Planet SKS building in the background

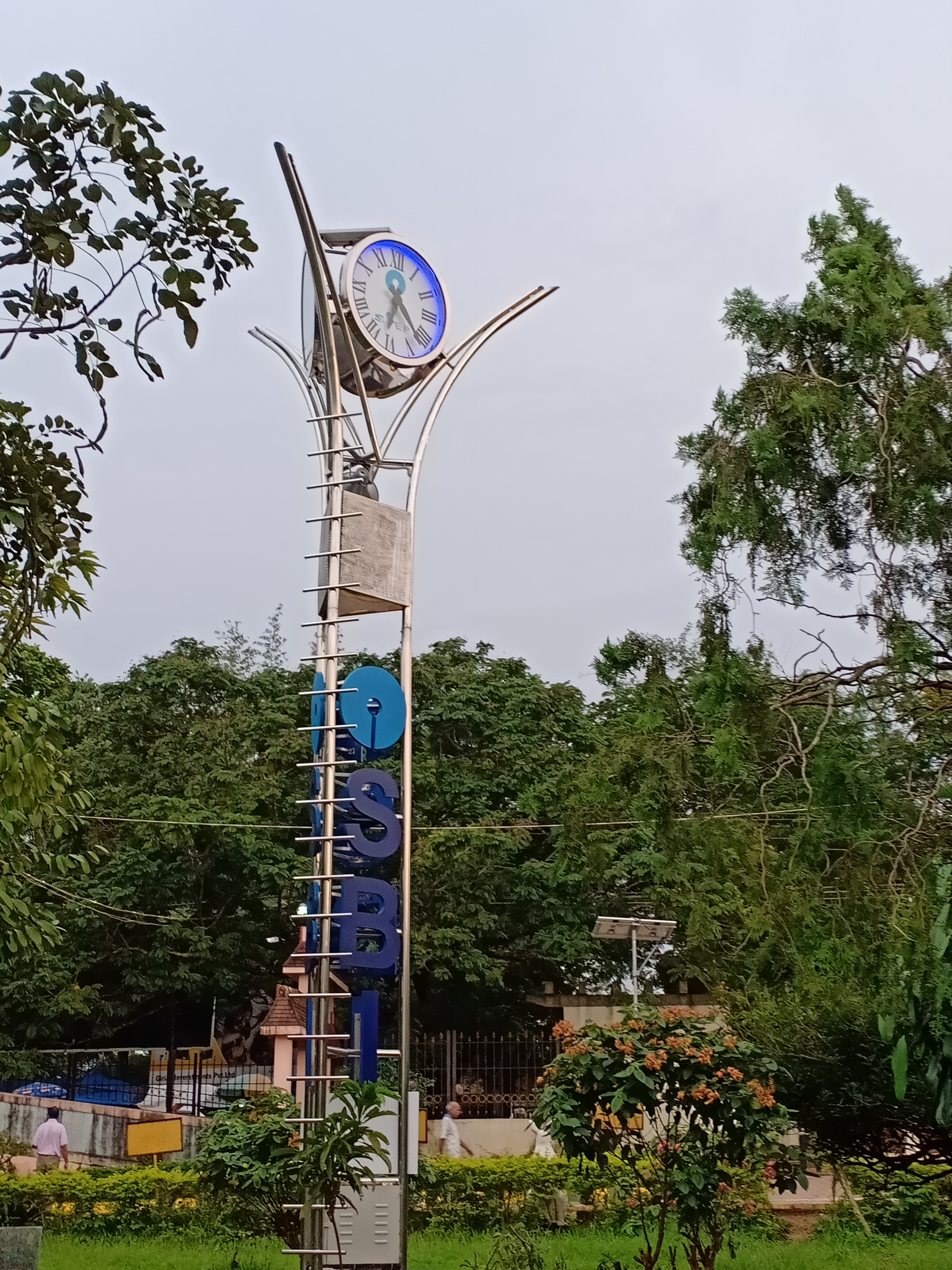
SBI clock tower at Kadri Park in Mangaluru

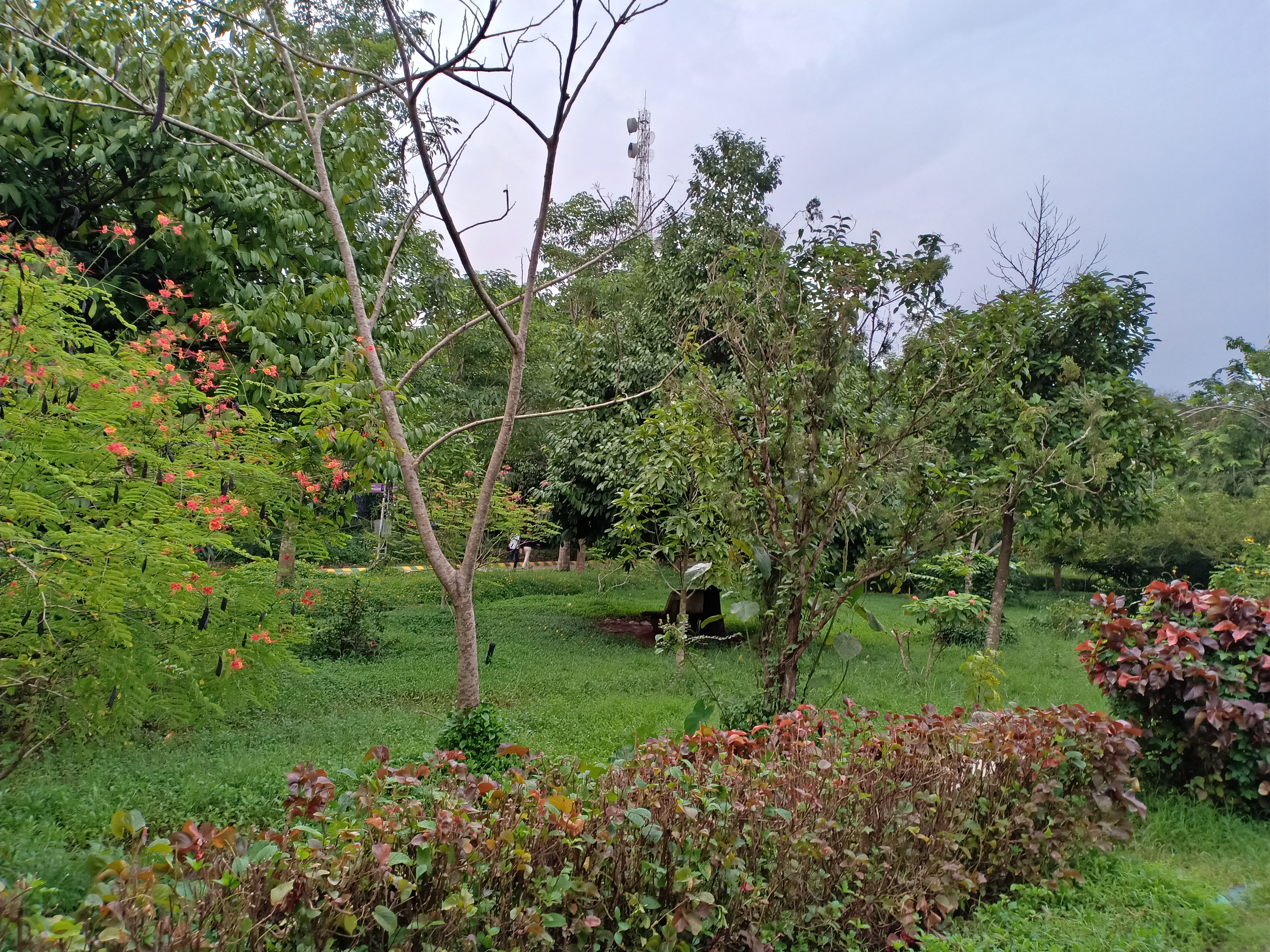
Kadri Park in Mangaluru - Garden near the Alley walkway

== See also ==
- Mahatma Gandhi Road (Mangalore)
- K S Rao Road
- NITK Beach
- Sasihithlu Beach
- Panambur Beach
- Tannirbhavi Beach
- Ullal beach
- Someshwar Beach
- Pilikula Nisargadhama
- Tagore Park
- St. Aloysius Chapel
