= NITK Beach =

- Beach
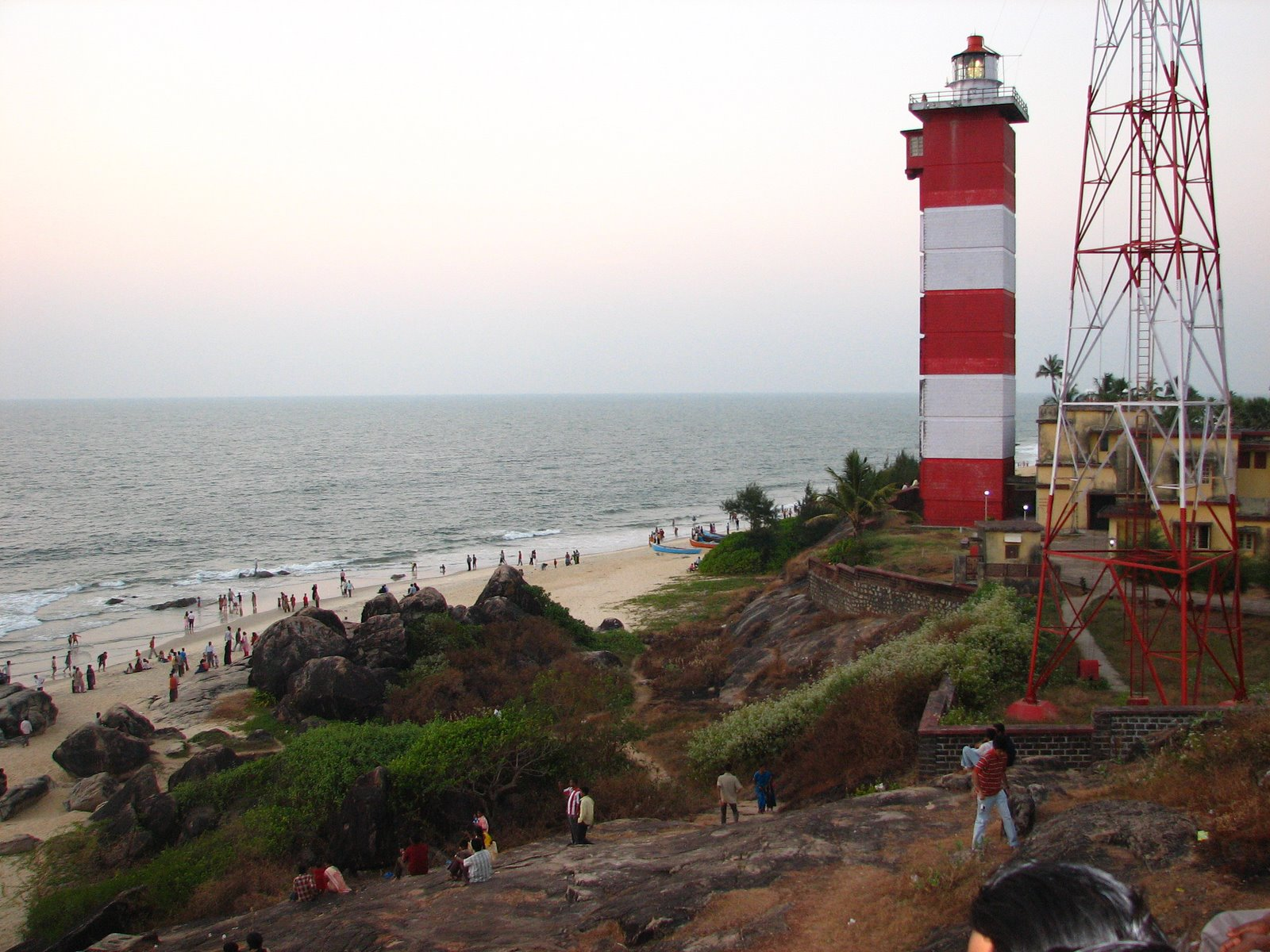
- Lighthouse alongside NITK Beach
- Location: Surathkal
- City: Mangaluru
- Country: India

Government
  - Body: Mangaluru City Corporation

NITK Beach also known as Surathkal beach is on the Arabian Sea coast at Surathkal, 16 km (9.9 mi) north of the centre of Mangaluru city, in the Dakshina Kannada district of Karnataka, India. It is a private beach that was later named after the nearby NITK (National Institute of Technology, Karnataka).Locals call it as Dodda Kopla beach.There is Nine hundred years old Shri Sadashiva Ganapathi Temple on the big rock near Suratkal lighthouse.

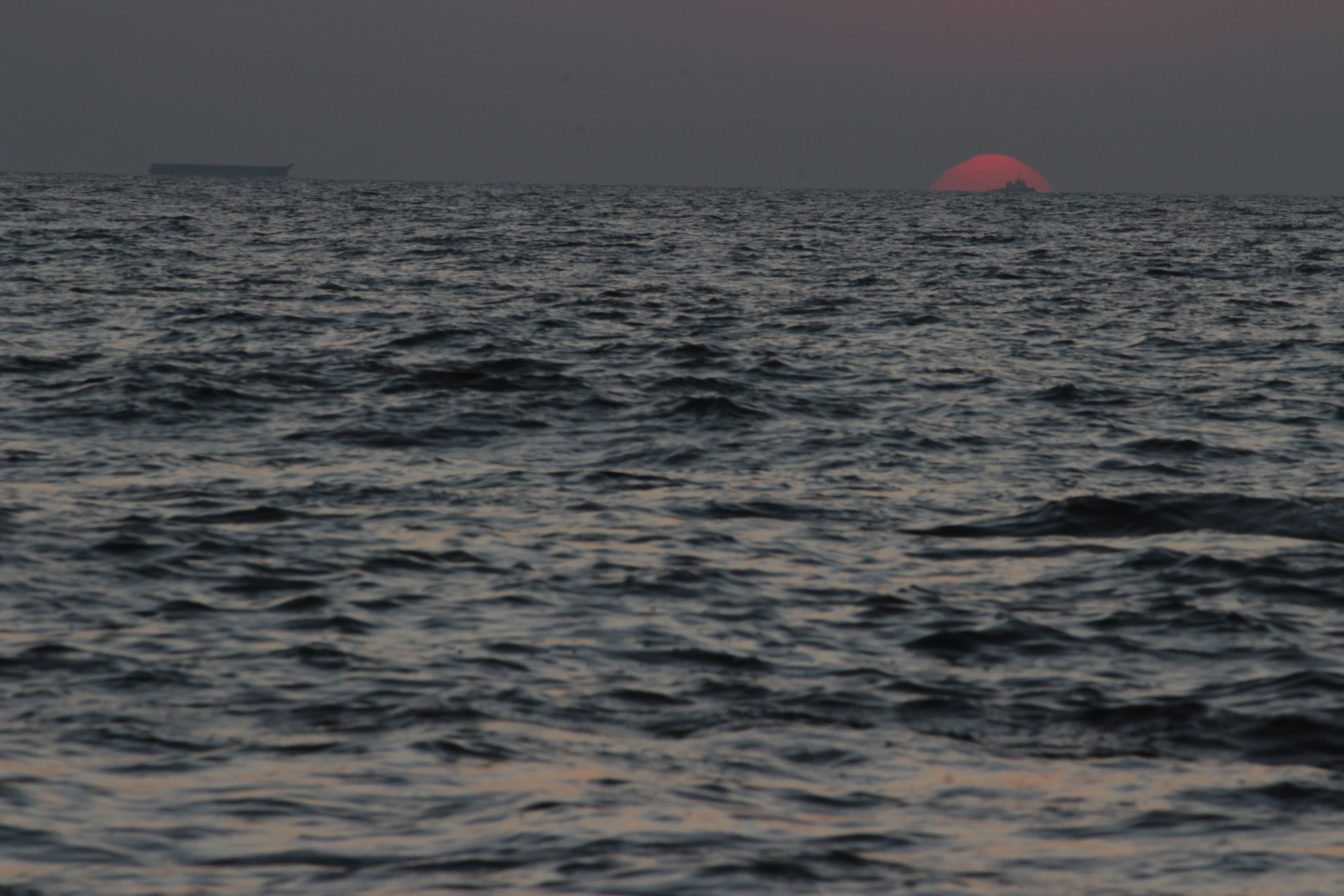
Sunset at NITK Beach, Mangalore, Karnataka

A lighthouse constructed in the year 1972 is close by. Suratkal lighthouse is open for public visit in the evening on Surathkal beach.

== Educational Institutions nearby ==
- National Institute of Technology Karnataka
- Srinivas Institute of Medical Sciences and Research Centre
- Srinivas Institute of Dental Sciences
- Srinivas University College of Engineering & Technology (SUCET)

== Climate ==
Mangaluru has a tropical monsoon climate and is under the direct influence of the Arabian Sea branch of the southwest monsoon.

== Accidents ==
This beach has had many drowning accidents since the 1960's. Although reported primarily in local Kannada language newspapers. The rocks on the seashore misguide people that it is not deep, but strong waves and whirlpools can make people drown and there are no lifeguards.

- A student of NIT Warangal named Nirmala Dangwal from Bageshwar, drowned here on 21 January 2020.
- A student from SVIT drowned here in 2008.
- A youth from Bantwal drowned in October 2024 while making merry.
- One young person dead another missing after drowning in April 2025

== See also ==
- Surathkal
- Panambur Beach
- Tannirbhavi Beach
- Ullal beach
- Someshwar Beach
- Pilikula Nisargadhama
- Kadri Park
- Tagore Park
- Bejai Museum
- Krishnapura Matha at Krishnapura (Sankesha) which is five kilometre by road.
