= Someshwara Temple =

- Shri Someshwara Temple

Religion
- Affiliation: Hinduism
- District: Dakshina Kannada
- Deity: Somanatha (Lord Shiva)
- Festival: Maha Shivaratri

Location
- Location: Someshwar, Ullal, Mangalore
- State: Karnataka
- Country: India

Someshwara Somanatha Temple is situated on the banks of Arabian Sea at the Western Ghats of South India 13 kilometres (8.1 mi) away from Mangalore. The temple is known as Rudrapada Kshetra, and is also a pilgrimage centre for performing Pitrakrayas (last rituals of departed soul).

== History ==
Historically it is said to have been built by Kings of Alupa Dynasty in the 10th century A.D. The temple was under the Administrative rule of Kadambas of Banavasi, and Choula Kings of Ullala of the 12th century A.D. The two inscriptions found in the temple says that it was renovated in the 15th century A.D. at the time of Vijayanagara King Immadi Devaraya by Rajaguru Sree Kriyashaktri Devavodeya.
