= Sasihithlu Beach =

- Beach
- Location
- Coordinates: 12°54′35″N 74°47′28″E
- Country: India
- State: Karnataka
- Region: Tulu Nadu
- District: Dakshina Kannada
- City: Mangaluru

Sasihithlu beach also known as Daibittil beach is located in Sasihithlu village, which is situated north of Mangaluru city, in the state of Karnataka, in India. Sasihithlu Beach is situated approximately 6 km to the west of NH 66, and surrounded by the backwaters of the Pavanje and Shambhavi rivers. The two rivers meet at the beach. It is close to Mukka, one of the fastest developing localities of Mangaluru. This beach hosted the Indian Open of Surfing in 2016 and 2017.

== Accessibility ==
Sasihithlu Beach is well connected by public transport. There are several city buses(2,2A) from the main bus stop in statebank and other parts of the city. One can also take the non-express service buses that give a stop for Sasihithlu Beach right at Mukka. Once off the bus, one can take auto to reach.
