= Someshwar Beach =

- Beach
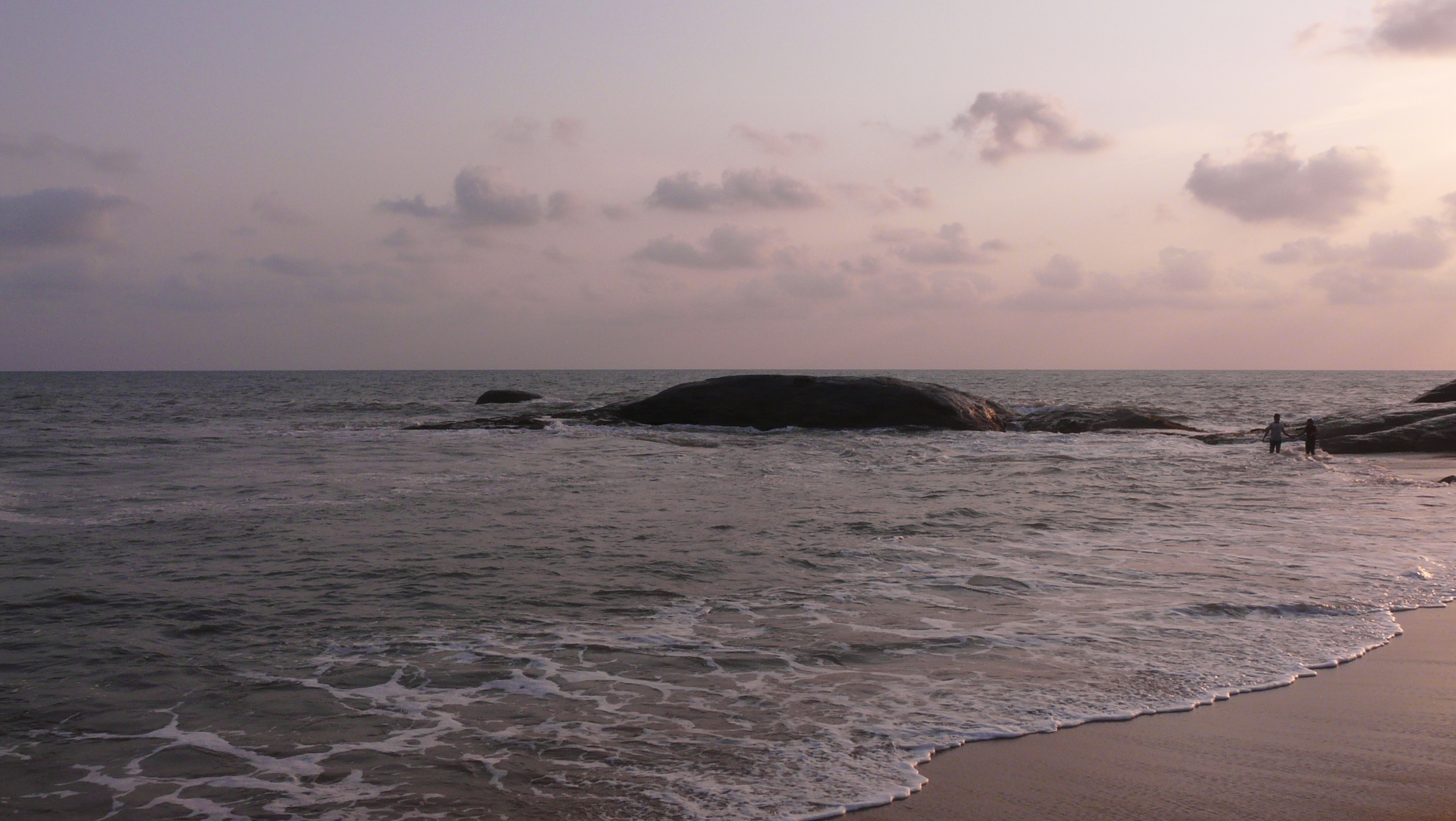
- Someshwar Beach
- Location: Ullal
- City: Mangaluru
- Country: India
- Near by interests: Shree Somanatha Temple

Government
  - Body: Ullal Town Municipal

Someshwar Beach (Tulu/Kannada :Someshwara) is a beach located in Ullal in the city of Mangaluru, India.

The name 'Someshwara beach' is derived from the name of Lord Somanatha, whose temple is located on the sea shore dating back centuries.

The hidden rocks and currents along this stretch of coast make this beach unsuitable for swimming.

Close to this beach there is a hill called 'Ottinene Hill'. There is vegetation and a number of medicinal plants that grow naturally on this hill.

== Rudra Paadhe ==
Someshwara beach is known for large rocks on the beach called Rudra Shile or Rudra Paadhe, Rudra is Lord Shiva and "Shile" or "Paadhe" means rock in Tulu.

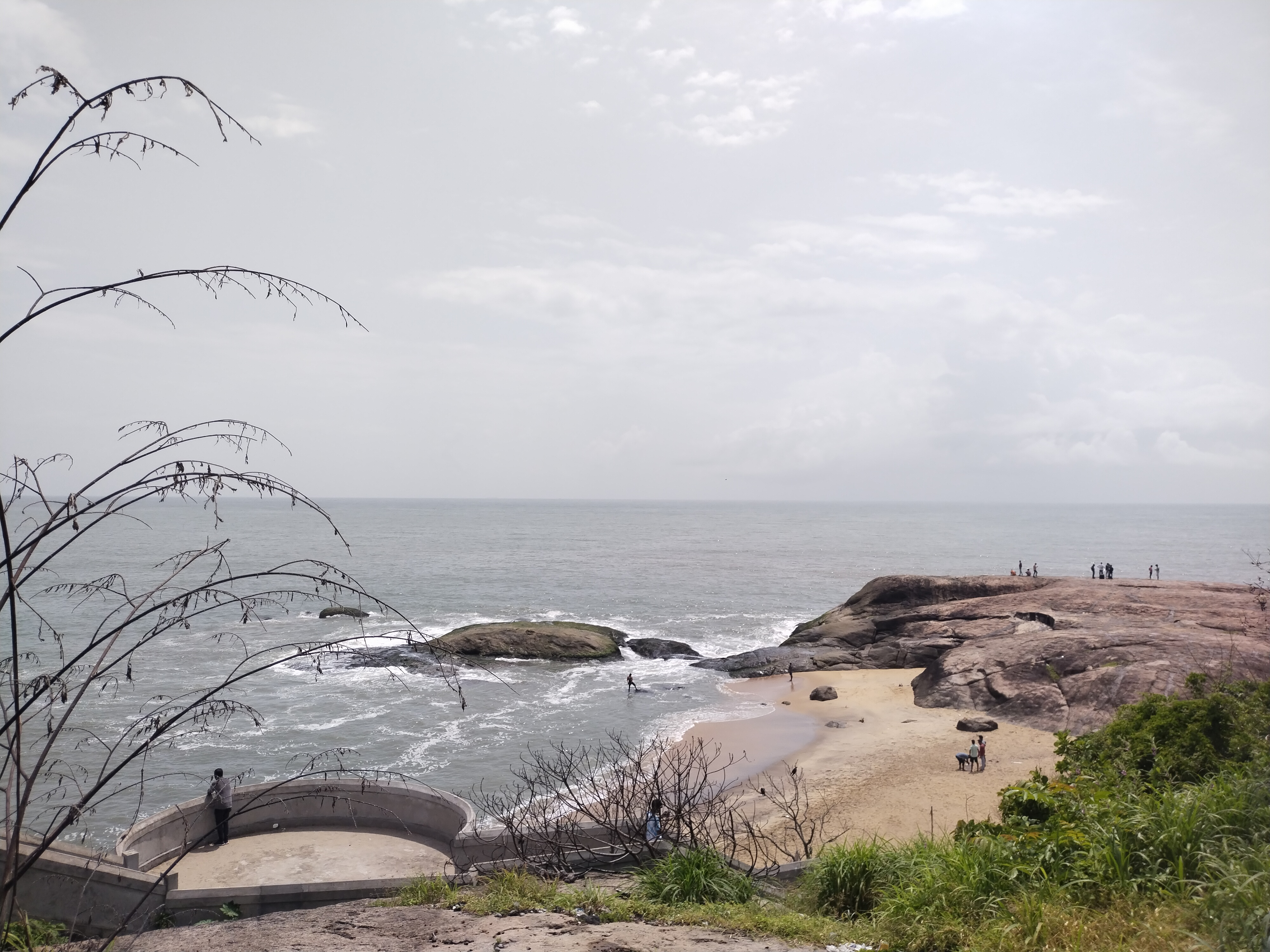
Rudra Padhe at Someshwara Beach, Ullal, Mangaluru
