= St. Aloysius Chapel =

Catholic chapel in Mangalore, India

Coordinates: 12°52′25″N 74°50′43″E

- St Aloysius Chapel
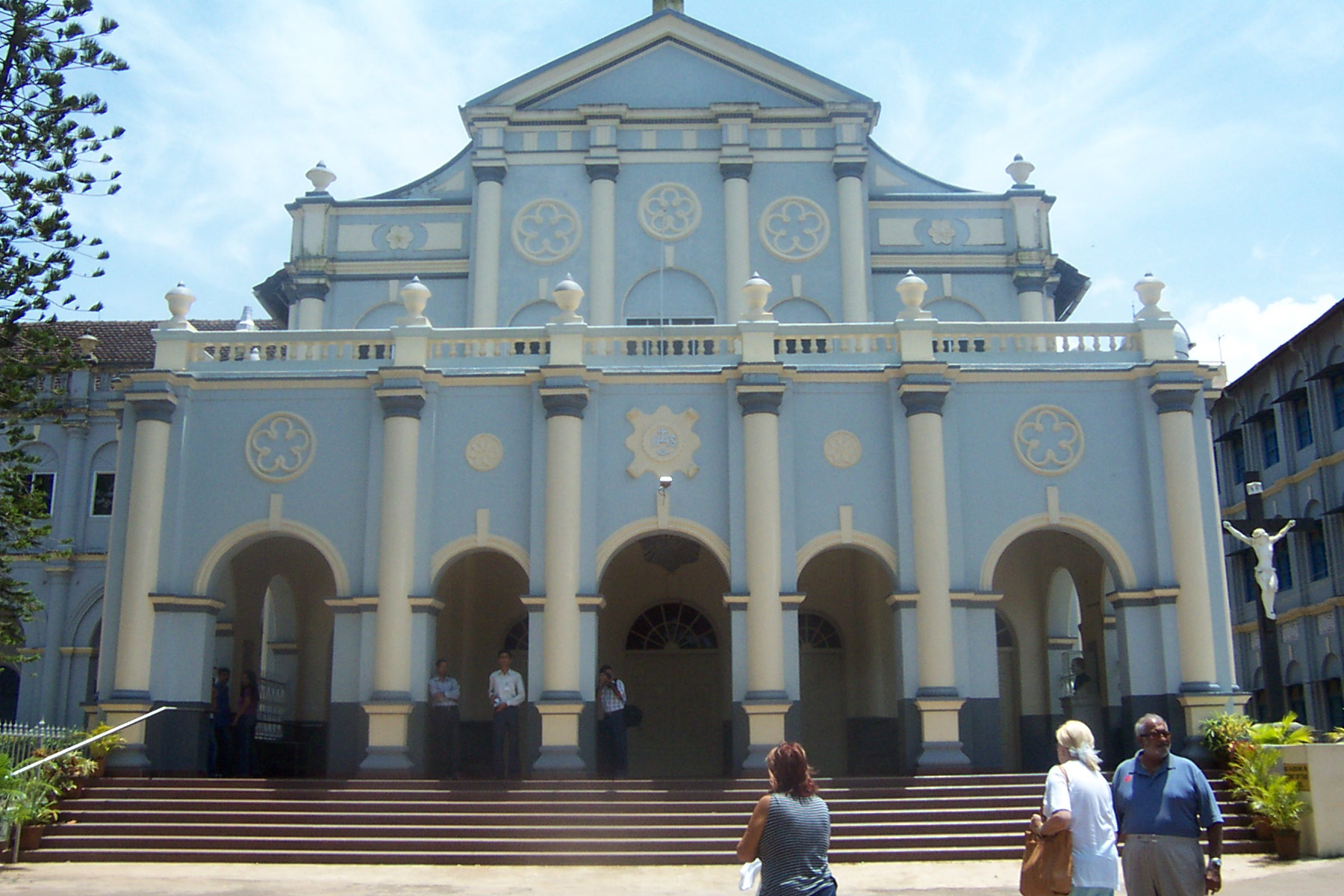
- The St Aloysius Chapel in Mangaluru, built by the Italian Jesuit Antonio Moscheni in 1884, during the Mangalore Mission (1878)
- Interactive map of the St. Aloysius Chapel area
- Former names: Cappella di San Luigi; Capela de São Luís
- Alternative names: St. Aloysius College Chapel

General information
- Location: Mangalore, India
- Completed: 1878; 148 years ago

St. Aloysius Chapel (Italian: Cappella di San Luigi, Portuguese: Capela de São Luís), or the chapel of St. Aloysius College, is a Catholic chapel in Mangalore in the state of Karnataka in southwest India. The chapel is situated in the heart of the city on the Lighthouse Hill.

== History ==
The St. Aloysius Chapel in Mangaluru was built by Jesuit missionaries in 1880 and its interiors painted by the Italian Jesuit Antonio Moscheni in 1899, during the Mangalore Mission in 1878. The Italian Jesuits played an important role in education, health, and social welfare of the Mangalorean Catholic community and built the St. Aloysius College in 1880, St Aloysius Chapel in 1884, and many other institutions and churches.

== The paintings ==
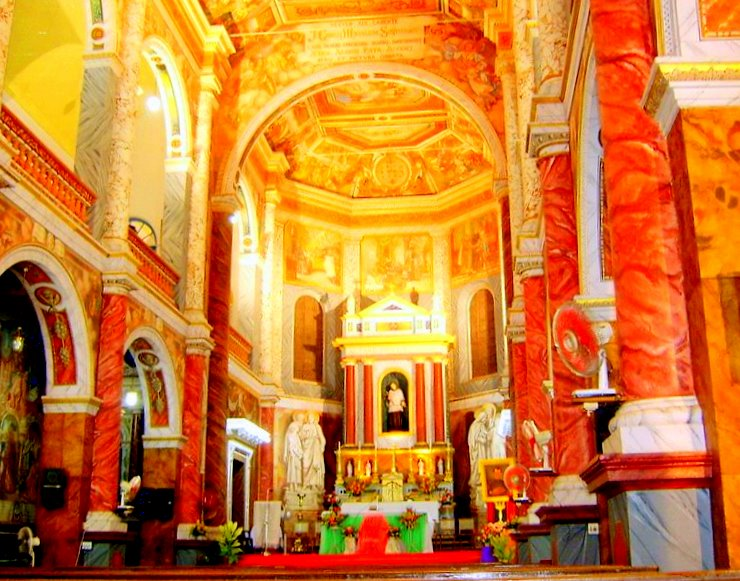
Interior of the chapel

The interior of the chapel decorated with paintings by Antonio Moscheni (1854–1905) that cover almost all of the walls, which is unusual in chapels in India. The paintings are preserved by a recognised board of the nation which maintains and restores all historic artefacts.

The central row of paintings on the ceiling depicts the life of Saint Aloysius Gonzaga, to whom the college and chapel are dedicated.

Aloysius earlier life is shown in the first three panels from the rear, the paintings include:

- Aloysius as a child promising at the Altar of Mary in Florence to dedicate his life to God.
- Aloysius preaching about God to his townsfolk.
- Aloysius' first communion.
- Aloysius seeking admission to the Jesuit Order.

The rest of Aloysius's life is depicted on the wall above the altar. The central picture depicts him serving the plague stricken in Rome. He contracted the disease and died, at the age of 23.

The sloping ceiling panels portray the Apostles, with floral garlands weaving through the panels. No two garlands have the same flowers. The angels who hold the garland are life size. The upper arches depict saints of the Church. The lower arches depict Jesuit saints. These paintings include

- St. Thomas, Apostle of India, with a spear in his hand.
- St. Francis of Assisi Patron of environmentalists.
- St. Peter Claver, who served the slaves when they arrived in Cartagena, Colombia, making them feel through his care and love that they were his equals, on the fourth left arch.
- Bl. Rodolfo Acquaviva, who went to the Court of Akbar, and was there held in high esteem.
- St John de Britto the first missionary to wear the dress of a sanyasi as a sign of inculturation. He was a scholar who studied Sanskrit, Tamil and Indian customs.

The painting on the rear wall shows Jesus as the friend of children. It is considered to be the masterpiece of Moscheni. Due to seepage of rain water the painting was covered with fungus and calcium carbonate crystals. It has now been restored but a patch of the unrestored painting has been left untouched below the woman seated at the right.

There are many paintings which take up the life of Jesus.

- The birth of Our Lord on Christmas night.
- Jesus being baptised by St John the Baptist
- The wedding feast at Cana, where Jesus changed the water in the six pitchers into wine.
- The Crucifixion of Jesus between two thieves on Calvary. Mary, the Mother of Jesus and Magdalen, are at the foot of the Cross. A soldier, Longinus, pierces with a lance the side of Jesus. The artist's controlled use of light shows that there was darkness and lightning.

=== How the chapel was painted ===
There are two types of paintings in the chapel: fresco and canvas. A fresco is painted on fresh wet lime plaster walls. The colours get embedded in the lime plaster as it dries up. Frescos cover about 600 square metres of the walls of the chapel. For an oil painting, the colours are made by mixing pigments with linseed oil. The canvas is made of pure linen of strong close weave. The paintings on the ceilings in the chapel (about 400 square metres) are in oil on canvas.

=== Restoration of the paintings ===
With the passage of time the paintings suffered damage due to the humidity and dust and the deterioration had set in. The stitches of the canvases had given way. The canvases were taken down with the help of a special cradle, the paintings were conserved scientifically by removing dust, dirt, and chemical cleaning that revealed the true colours of paintings which were hidden underneath. The pieces were restitched and the joints were reinforced. After restretching the canvas on the frame the paintings were put back in place. The work of restoration was done by specialists of INTACH from 1991 to 1994 under the guidance of Dr Om Prakash Agrawal.

=== The artist ===
Antonio Moscheni was born in the village of Stezzano near Bergamo, Italy on 17 January 1854. His artistic ability was discovered early and he was sent to the famed Accademia Carrara in Bergamo. He studied under able masters and acquired considerable proficiency in the art of painting. He then went to Rome to study the masterpieces of the Vatican. Fresco painting now became his passion. In 1889, Antonio renounced a painting career and took up religious work. But his religious superiors did not wish his talents to be lost and ordered him to paint several churches in Italy before sending him to Mangalore, to the Chapel of St. Aloysius College. It took him a little over two years to cover the walls and ceilings of the chapel with paintings.

== See also ==
- List of Jesuit sites
