= Tannirbhavi Beach =

Coordinates: 12°53′24″N 74°48′51″E

Thannirbhavi Beach
- Beach
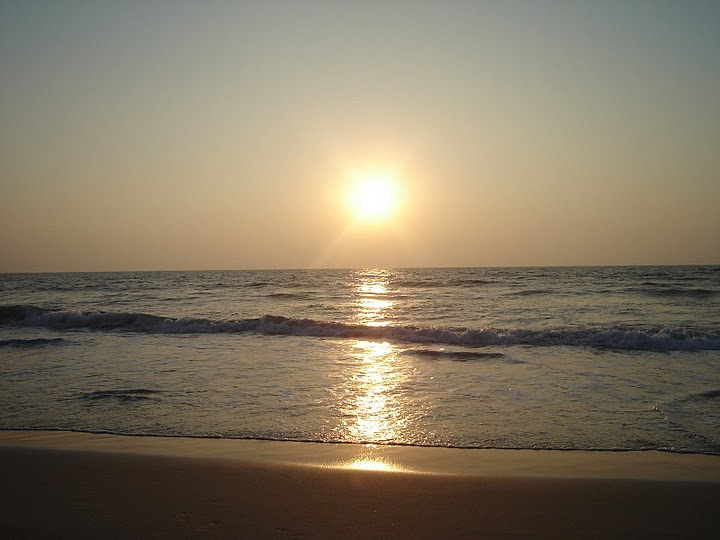
- Thannirbhavi Beach
- Interactive map of Thannirbhavi Beach
- Location: Fathima church
- City: Mangaluru
- Country: India
- Lifeguard Available: Yes
- Activities: Swimming; Surfing

Government
  - Body: Mangaluru City Corporation

Tannirbhavi beach is a beach in Mangaluru, Karnataka, India. It is one of the most popular tourist destinations in coastal Karnataka. Along with the beach, Sultan Battery, Tannirbavi Tree Park & the proposed Marine museum are also the tourist attractions. It can be reached either by land near Kuloor Bridge or by ferry via Gurupura river from Sultan Battery.

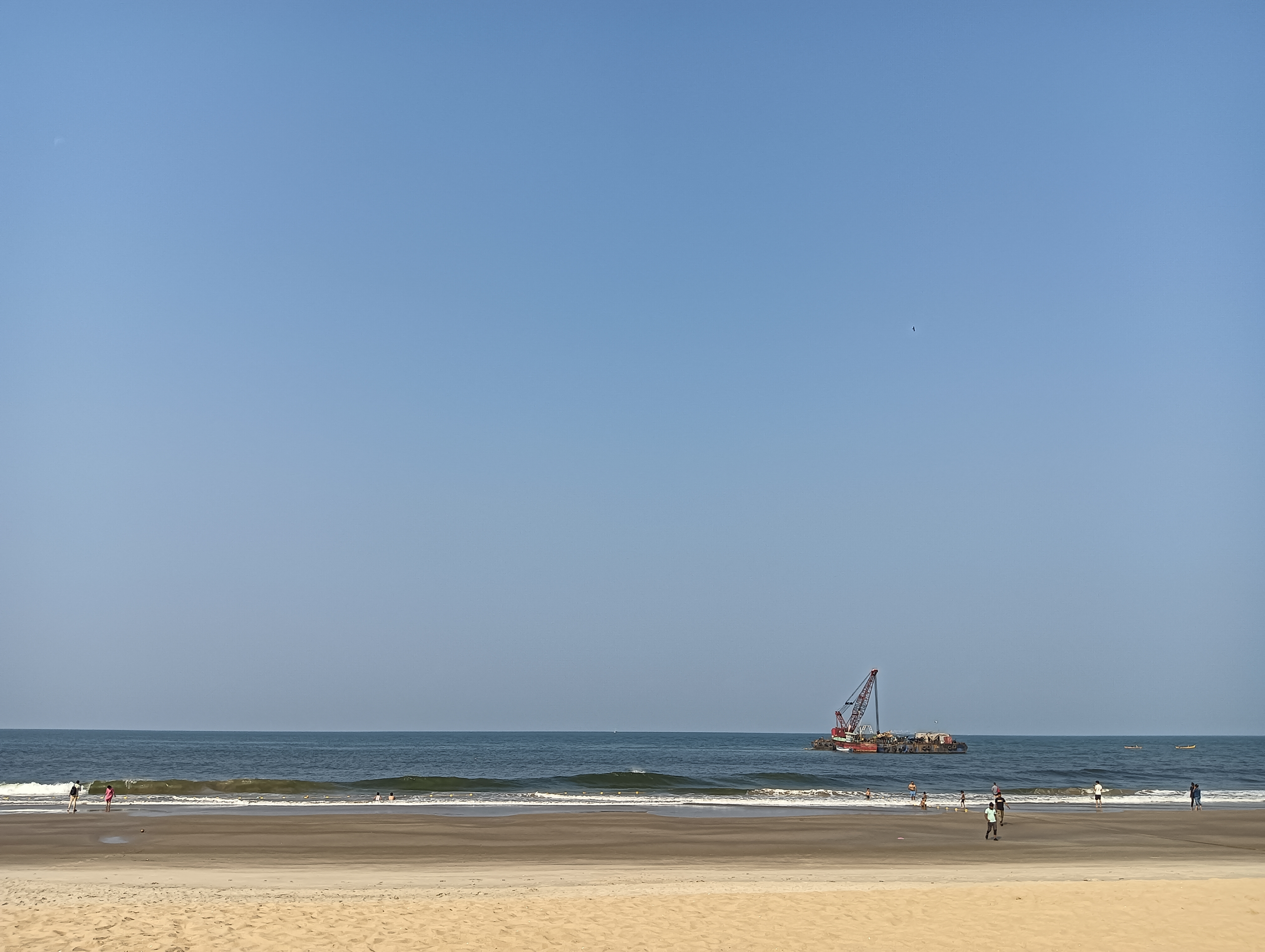

Tannirbhavi (also spelled as Tannirbavi) is one of the popular beaches in Mangaluru city, and comes second in popularity next to Panambur beach. It is also called as Thandrai in Tulu language. Tannirbhavi beach has some basic facilities like lifeguards, proper toilets, a parking lot, a couple of small eateries and concrete benches.

On the other side of the land strip of the beach there is a barge-mounted 220 MW power plant set up by the GMR Group. It is located at a distance of 12 km from Mangaluru.

== Tannirbhavi Tree Park ==
Tannirbhavi Tree Park is set up in an area of 15 hectares near Tannirbhavi Beach. It is an initiate by Karnataka Forest Department. The Tree Park includes tree species found in the Western Ghats and also the trees/plants are herbal and have medical importance. It has various sculptures depicting the culture of the region — Tulu Nadu such as Yakshagana and Buta Kola.

== Connectivity ==
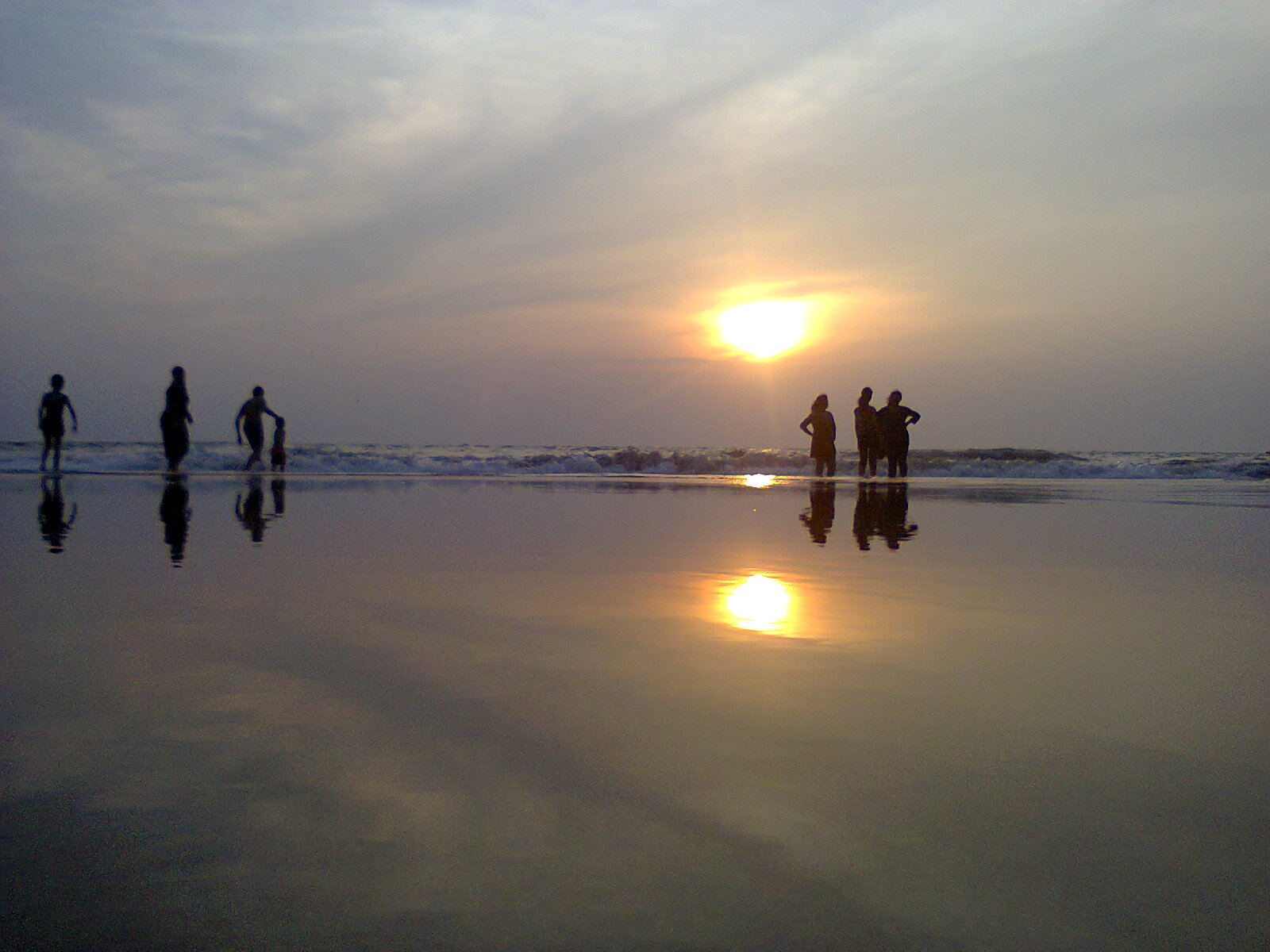
Tannirbhavi Sunset

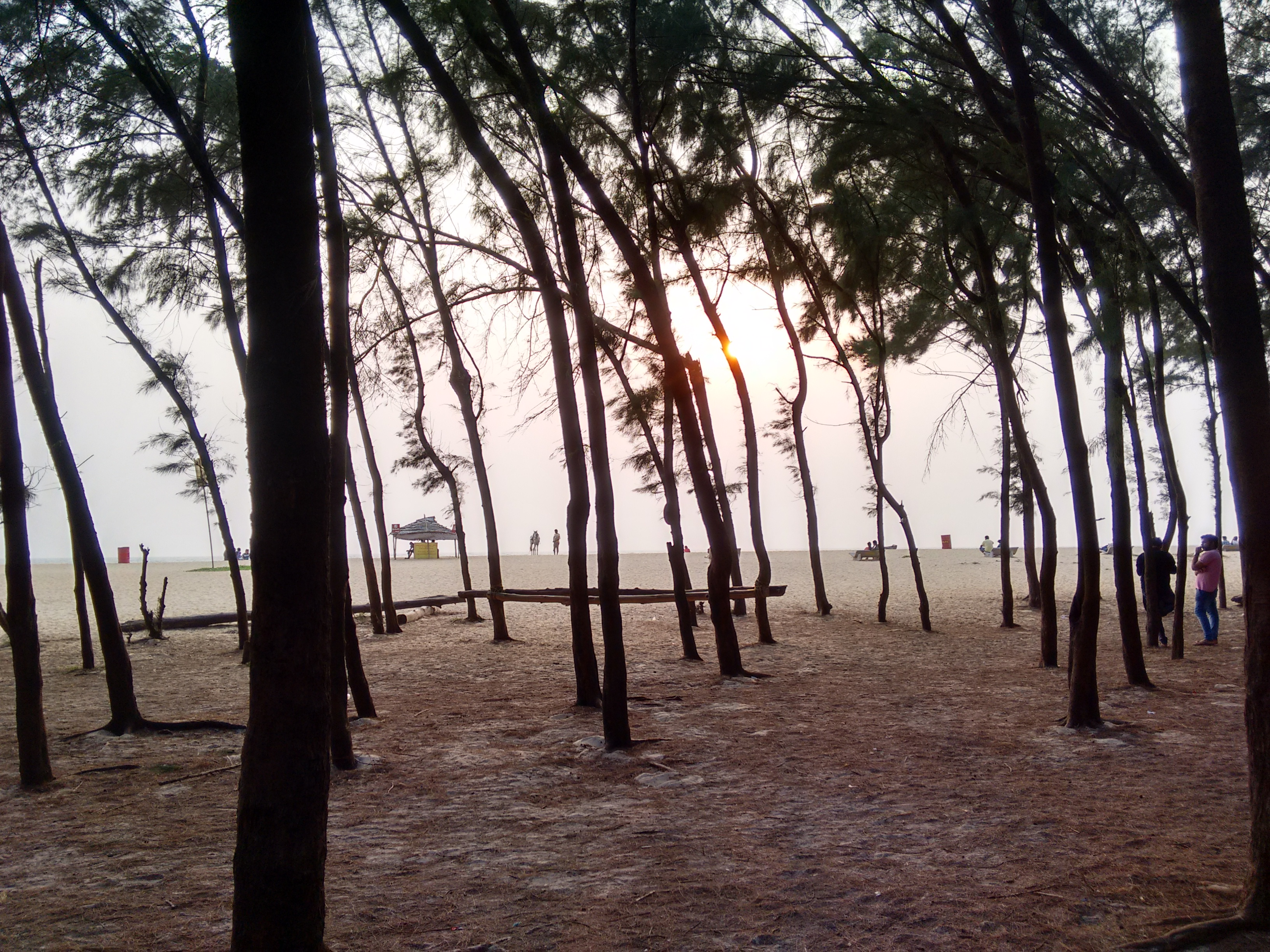
Seaside trees at the beach

Tannirbhavi is well connected by road, and easily reachable by own vehicle or a hired one. Alternatively, you can take city bus (No. 16, 16A) from Statebank to Sultan Battery and take a Ferry ride across Gurupur river. After crossing the river with the ferry, you can find a way between trees and reach the beach.

== Blue Flag Certification ==
Tannirbhavi Beach is in the process of being developed as India's 13th Blue Flag beach. The development work is being carried out by Pune-based BVG India Limited at a cost of Rs 7.56 crore. The beach is expected to offer various facilities including waste processing units, grey water treatment plants, and separate bathrooms and shower facilities for men and women. A kilometer-long wood-polymer-composed path is also being built across the beach. The beach will also feature an office, a first aid station, a control room for the CCTV system, and other amenities. The project aims to complete all improvements by the end of July, after which an application for Blue Flag certification will be submitted.
