= Buta Kola =

Ritual folk dance and divination from India

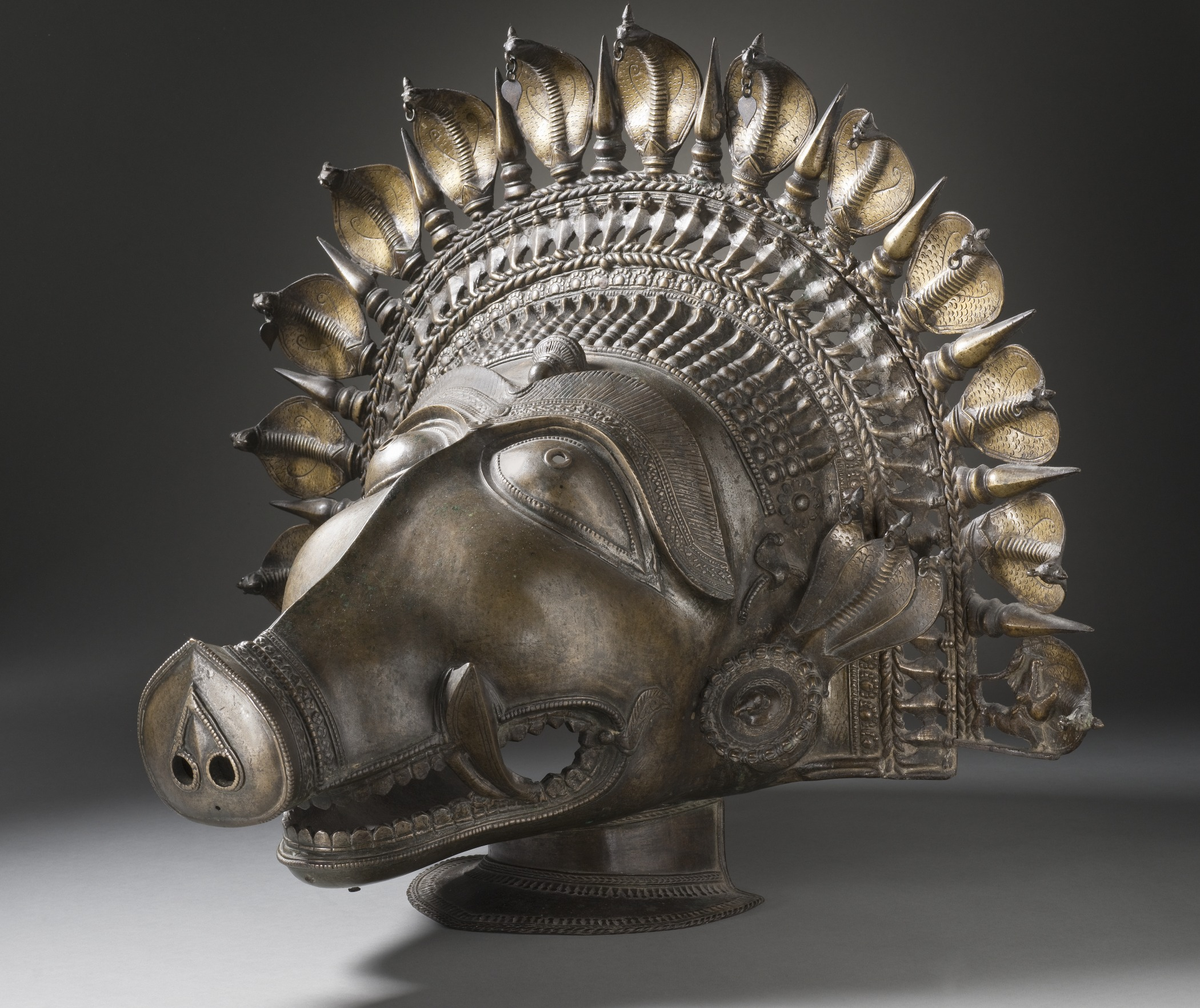
Dancer's headpiece in the form of (boar face deity) of Paddeyi Jumadi or Malaraya or Beernalva or Komaraya of Kasaragod region of Tulunadu, 18th century CE, now housed at LACMA in Los Angeles

Būta Kōlā (Note: /buːt̪ʌ/ is the local pronunciation while the standardised Sanskrited Tulu pronunciation is /bʱuːt̪ʌ koːlɑː/) (Tulu: Bhūta Kōla), also referred to as Daiva Kōlā or Daiva Nēmā, is a Hindu folk dance performance practised, believed and protected by the Tuluvas of Tulu Nadu and parts of Malenadu of Karnataka and Kasargod in northern Kerala, India. The dance is highly stylised and performed as part of "Bhootaradhane" or "Daivaaradhane" or worship of the local deities of the Tulu-speaking population in South India. It has influenced Yakshagana folk theatre. Būta kōlā is closely related to Theyyam of North Malabar region and some parts of Karnataka. Theyyam is an evolved form of Būta Kōla. Theyyam, in turn, shares similarities with a similar Hindu folk dance called Thirayattam.

It involves extended chanting of Tulu Ballards and ceremonial preparations that typically span 8 to 10 hours. The ritual culminates with the placement of the mudi (sacred headgear) on the performer, a moment believed to mark the entry of the deity into the performer's body. As part of the process, the performer consumes madhyam or Kali (toddy), which is believed to suppress the person's consciousness, allowing the divine consciousness of the daiva to manifest. This practice aligns with philosophical concepts found in Hindu texts such as the Yoga Vasistha, which describe how divine entities (devatas) can enter the human body, parakāya praveśanam at a Paramanu level. Hinduism traditionally recognises a multiplicity of devatas, often cited as 33 koti devatas along with the trinity Brahma, Vishnu, and Maheshwara and with the idea of Brahman, the highest universal principle.

== List of Daivas ==
=== Bobbarya ===
This God of the seas is worshipped mostly by members of the fishing community.

=== Guliga ===
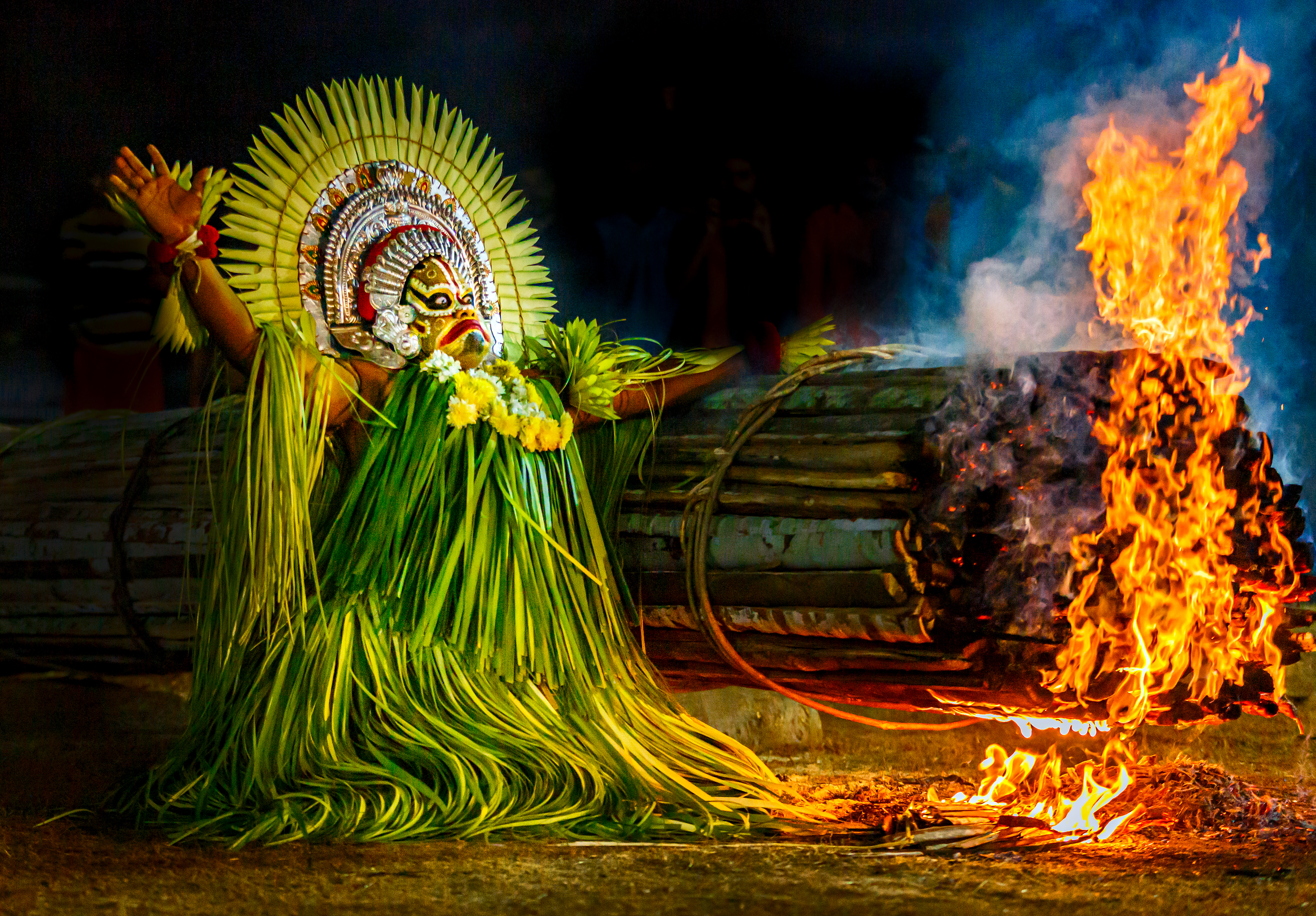
Guliga, a fearsome goblin deity.

Guliga or 'Guligan', also known as 'Gulige', is the most commonly worshipped Daiva, particularly by the Tuluvas. As per legend, Guliga is a goblin born out of a stone. Goddess Parvati discovered this stone in a pile of ash. Guliga was created when Shiva flung this ash into the water and was sent to Vishnu after his birth so that he may serve him. Guliga has extreme hunger which never ends; he even has the power to swallow the Earth.

However, Guliga was extremely aggressive, and this greatly annoyed Vishnu. Vishnu exiled Guliga to Earth as a result and tasked him with protecting the people on Earth.

Even on Earth, his ferocity and hunger caused disturbance. Lord Vishnu appeared once more and understood that only divine energy could calm him. He offered the tip of his little finger to Guliga. When Guliga bit it, divine peace flowed through him for the first time. His anger calmed, and he agreed to be the protector god of the humans. It has been foretold by Panjurli that anyone who persecutes humans and spreads evil will be killed by Guliga.

=== Jumadi ===
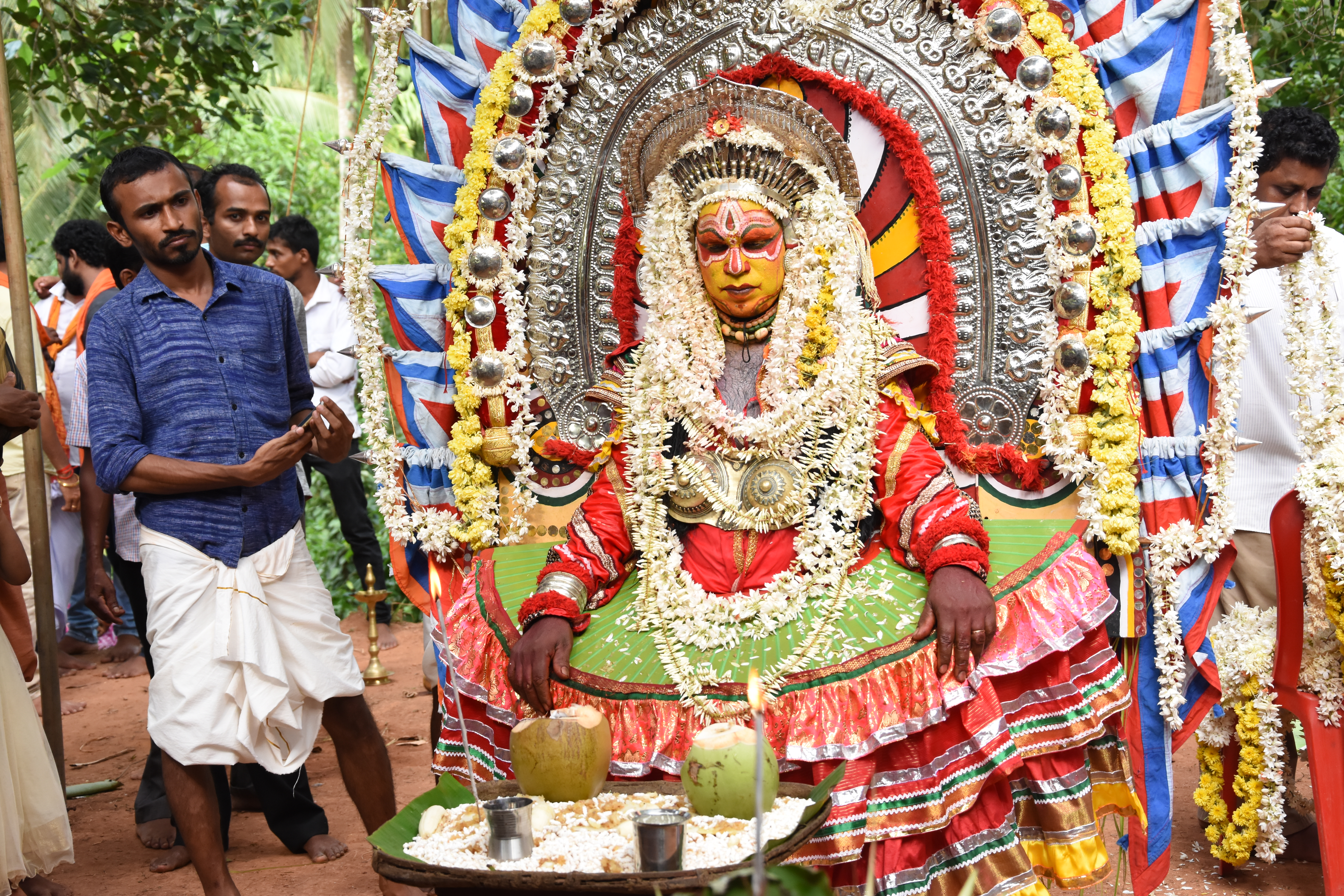
The androgynous deity Jumadi features a masculine head and feminine body.

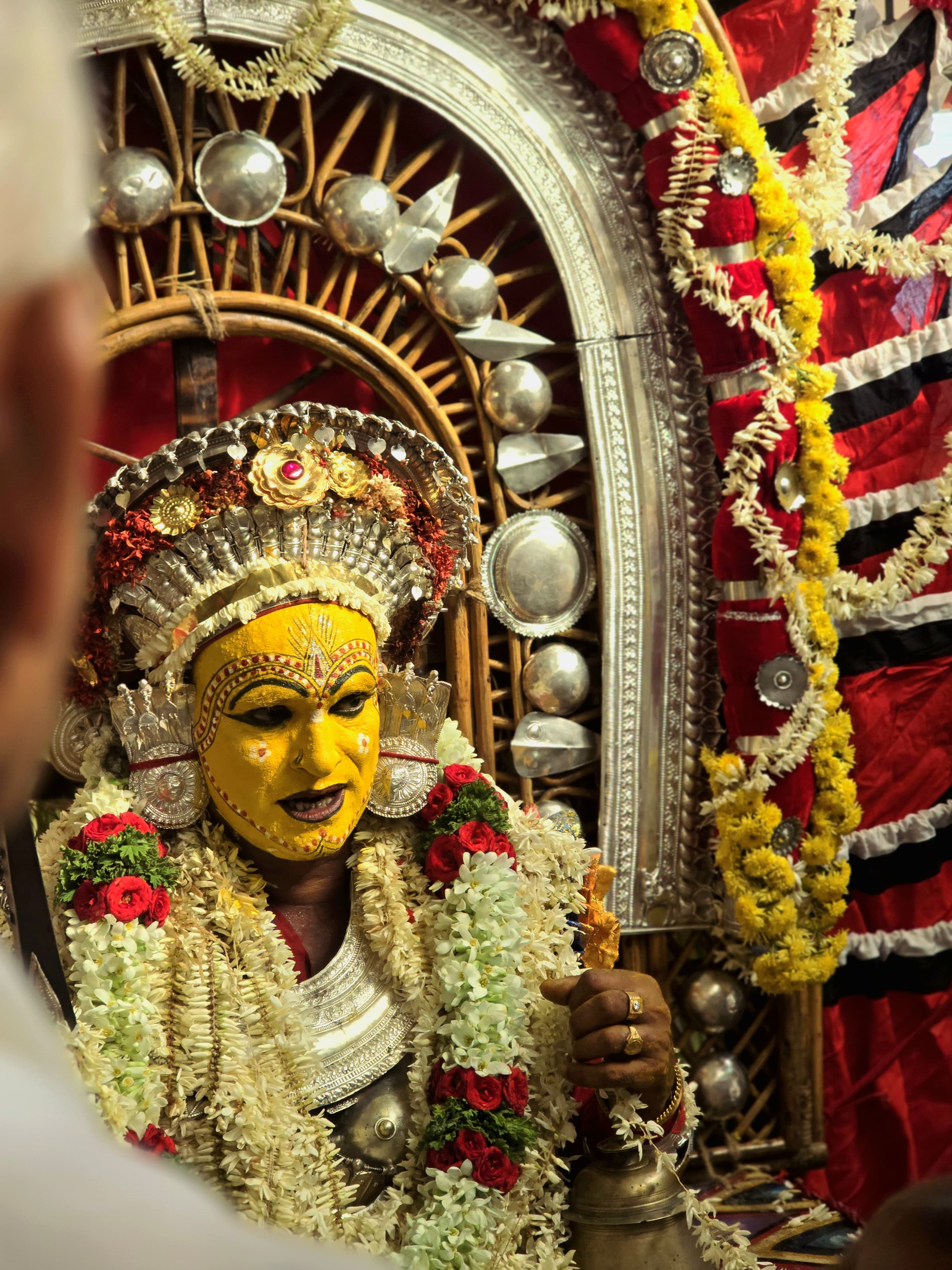
Karmade Doomavathi(jumadi) In, Kuloor Manjeshwara

Jumadi is an androgynous spirit with an insatiable thirst. The legend of Jumadi describes a man-eating asura named Dhumasura, with a boon that neither a man nor a woman could kill him. Shiva and Parvati were invoked by their adherents, who then descended from Kailasha to slay the asura. On their way, Parvati felt hungry, and Shiva tried to satisfy her through various means, but she remained unsatiated. At last, Shiva offered himself and ordered Parvati to swallow him. As Parvati swallowed him, Shiva's head did not pass beyond his consort's throat. Their bodies fused, in which the face of Shiva appeared with a moustache, below which was the neck and the body of Parvati. The deity's throat featured the lingam and wore a crown of nagas (snakes). This androgynous form of Shiva and Parvati slew Dhumasura in battle, thus receiving the epithet Dhumavati (not to be confused with the Mahavidya goddess Dhumavati).

=== Kalkuda and Kallurti ===
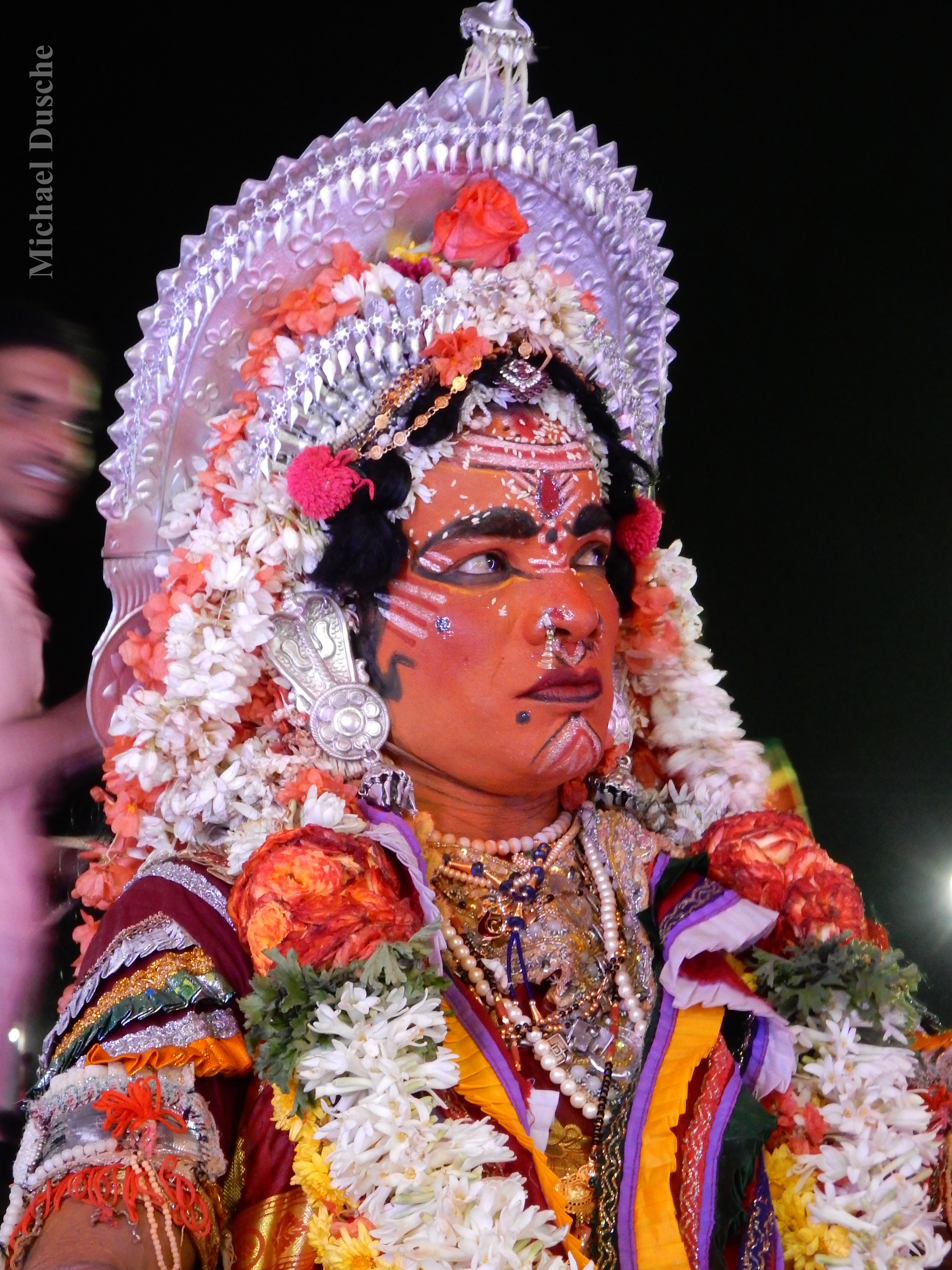
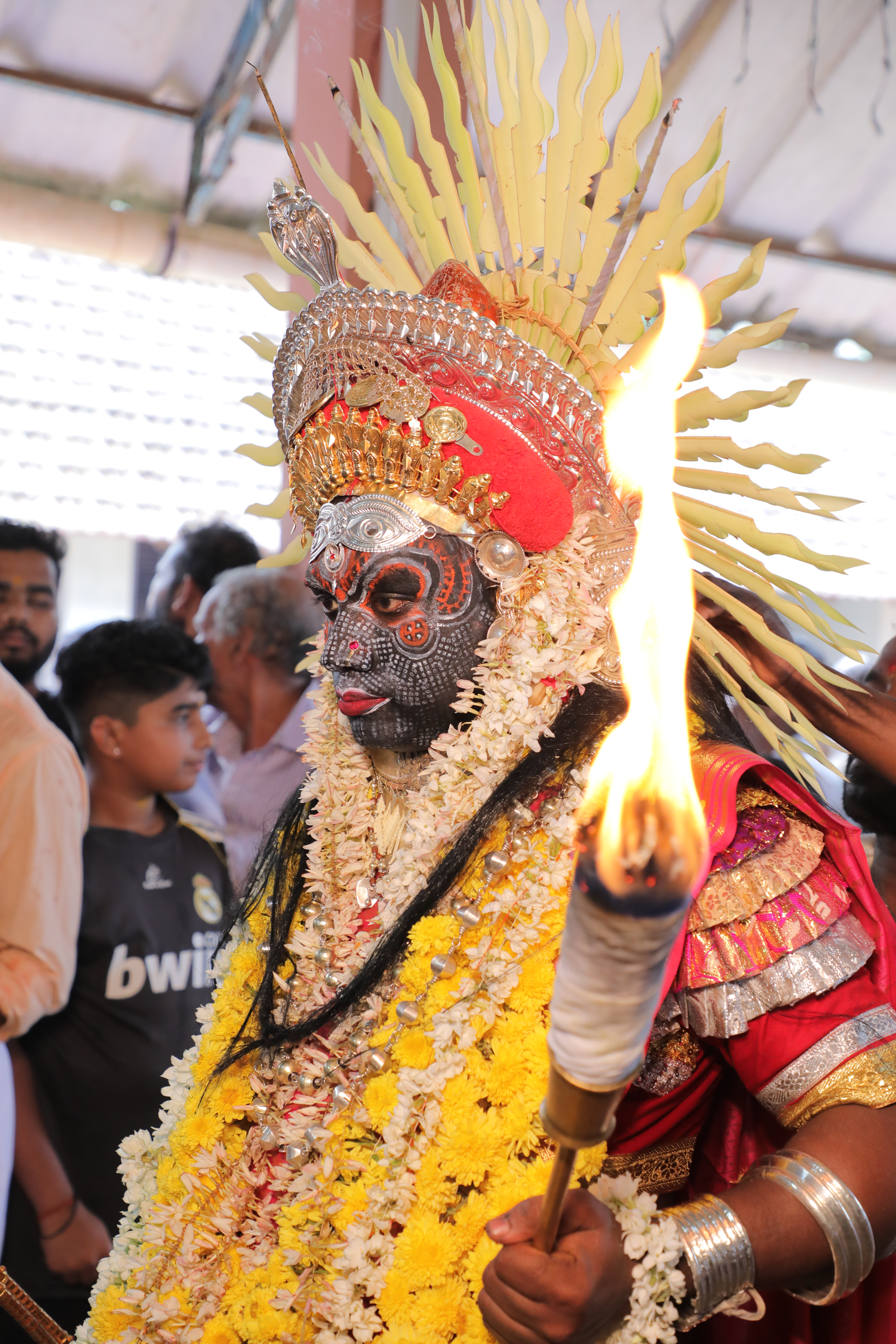
Kallurti (left) and Kalkuda (right)

They are Daivas who are brother and sister. According to legend, Kalkuda was a great sculptor who built the Gommateshwara (Bahubali) Statue in Karkala. After he completed building beautiful temples and monumental statues, the ruler of Karkala cut off his left arm and right leg so that he could not create such beautiful sculptures for any other king. On seeing her brother's state, Kallurti vowed to take revenge and requested Shiva to turn them into deities. Shiva agreed and the pair then took violent revenge on the king, his family, and his kingdom. Their destruction was only stopped when a master magician promised them that they would be worshipped as and how they wanted.

=== Koragajja ===
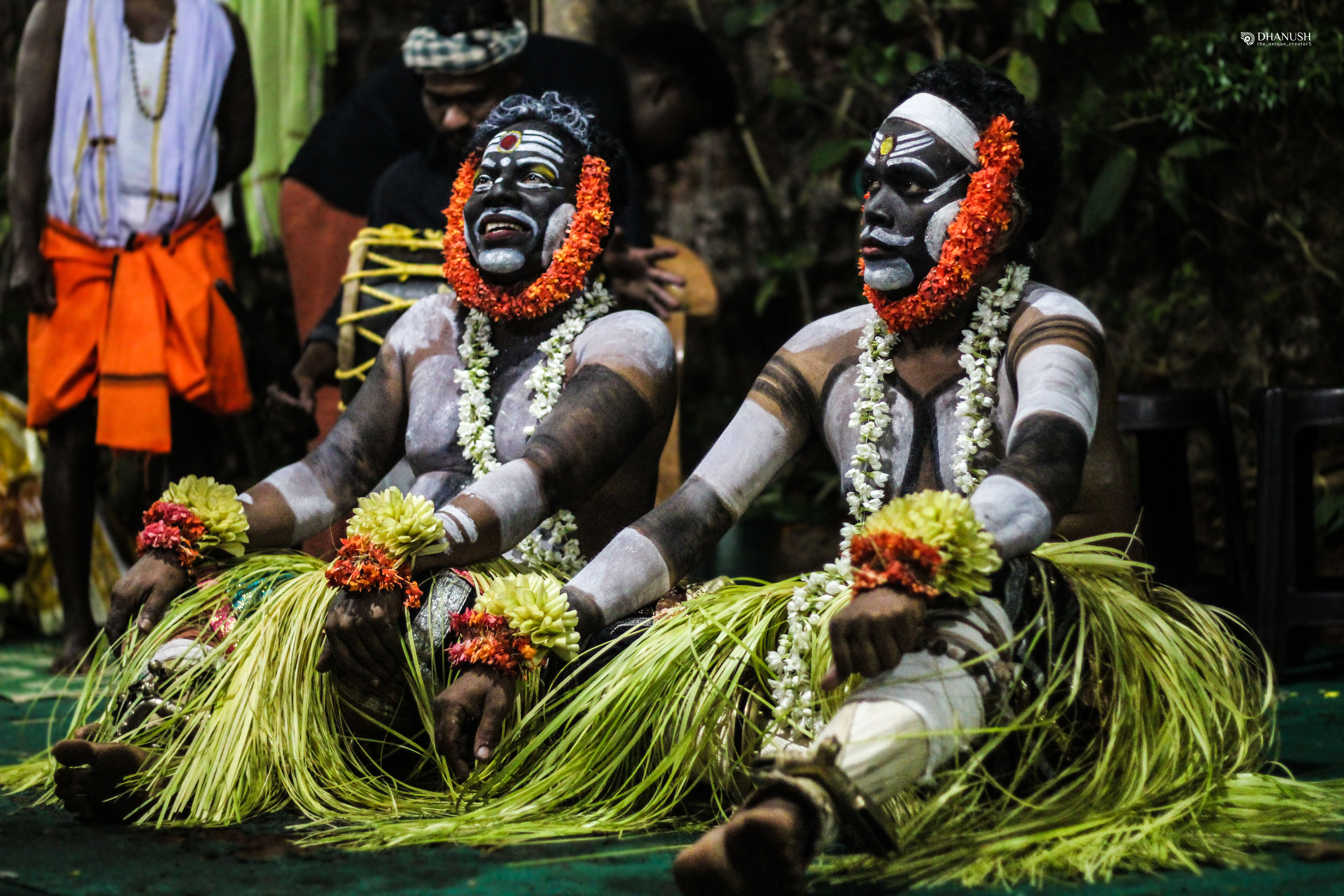
Koragajja daiva portrayed by two mediums

Koragajja is invoked for help in solving any problem, to get back something lost, or to get any work done on time.

=== Koti and Chennayya ===
Koti and Chennayya are twin heroes who are worshipped as martial gods.

=== Panjurli ===
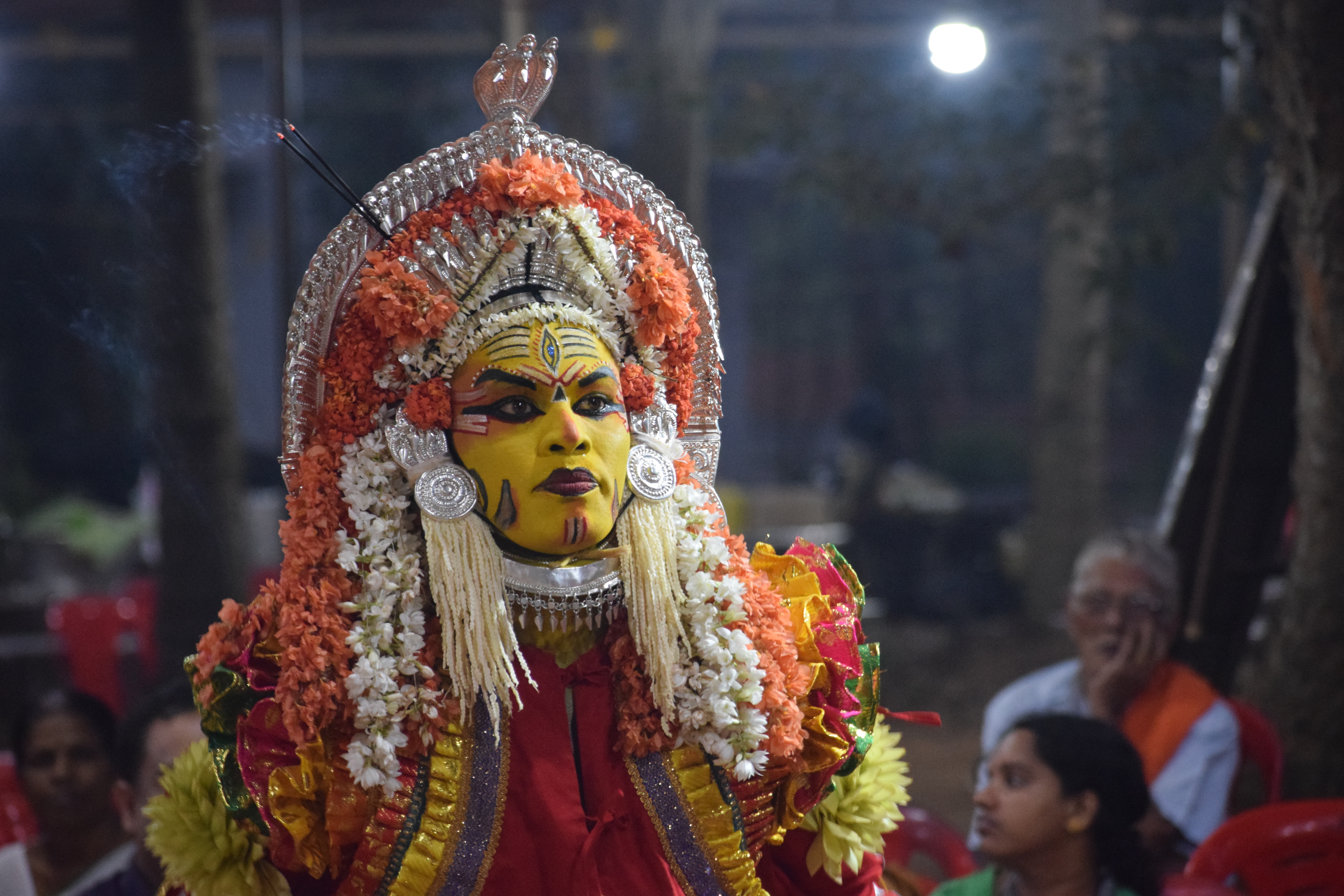
Panjurli, a wild boar deity

A boar spirit that is worshipped to ward off the menace of wild boars in order to protect the crops. According to Tulu regional belief, a wild boar died in the Hindu god Shiva's celestial garden in Mount Kailash. The boar's offspring was adopted by Shiva's wife, the goddess Parvati. The young boar became aggressive as he grew older and began destroying the plants and trees in Shiva's garden. Shiva became upset and decided to kill him. Parvati, being considered as the mother of all animate and inanimate things, however, defended the boar and asked her husband to pardon him. So instead of killing him, Shiva banished the boar to Earth as his gana and granted him the status of a protector god, revered by humans. This particular boar became a Bhoota (Divine Spirit) known as Panjurli. But some people syncretise Panjurli with Varaha, the boar incarnation of the god Vishnu, since the two deities are boars. He is also considered as a part of Shiva because of which he is also known as Shiva Shambhootha. Panjurli Daiva is also one of the earliest daivas who is worshipped all over Tulu Nadu. His earliest worship dates back to 700 BCE-800 BCE along with Bermer Daiva (Brahma). The idea behind the worship of Panjurli is that wild boars destroyed crops and thus, farmers started worshipping a boar god who was known as Panjurli and in return, they believe that Panjurli protects the crops.

== Etymology and History ==
The word is derived from būta / bhootha (Tulu for ‘spirit’, ‘deity’; in turn derived from Sanskrit भूत for ‘free elements’, 'which is purified', 'fit', 'proper', ‘true’, 'past', 'creatures'; Anglicized: ‘bhūta’, ‘bhoota’, ‘bootha’) and kōla (Tulu for ‘play, performance, festival’, or 'shape/form').

A bhūta kōlā or nēmā is typically an annual ritual performance where local spirits or deities (bhūtas, daivas) are being channelised by ritual specialists from certain communities among the Tribe such as the Nalike, Pambada, or Parawa communities. The bhūta cult is prevalent among the Tuluvas of Tulu Nadu region. The word kōla is conventionally reserved for the worship of a single spirit whereas a nēma involves the channelising of several spirits in hierarchical order. In kōlas and nēmas family and village disputes are referred to the spirit for mediation and adjudication. In feudal times, the justice aspect of the ritual included matters of political justice, such as the legitimation of political authority, as well as aspects of distributive justice. The produce of land directly owned by the būta (commons) as well as certain contributions from the leading manors was redistributed among the villagers.

== Types of Bhūta Worship ==
The Bhūta worship of South Canara is of four kinds, kōla, bandi, nēma, and agelu-tambila.

Kōla: Demi god dancing, is offered to the Bhūtas in the sthana of the village believed that which they are supposed to reside.
Bandi: Bandi is the same as kōla, with the addition of dragging about a chariot, on which the one who is representing the Bhūta is seated; most often, he is from the nalke, pambada or ajala communities.
Nēma: Nēma is a private ceremony in honour of the Bhūtas, held in the house of anyone who is so inclined. It is performed once in every year, two, ten, fifteen, or twenty years by well-to-do families.
Agelu-tambila: is a kind of worship offered only to the family people, wherein rice, dishes, meat, alcohol are served on plantain leaves and offered to spirits, deities, departed forefathers annually or once wishes are completed.

== Performance ==
The ritual performance at a būta kōla or daiva nēma involves music, dance, recital, and elaborate costumes. Recitals in Old Tulu recount the origins of the deity and tell the story of how it came to the present location. These epics are known as pāḍdanas.

== Cosmology ==
According to the ethnographer Peter Claus, the Tulu pāḍdanas reveal a cosmology which is distinctly Dravidian and thus different from the Puranic Hindu cosmology. Importantly, priesthood is not the preserve of a caste learned in scriptures but is shared between the ruling aristocracy on one hand and ritual specialists from the lower strata of society on the other hand. The world is divided into three realms: firstly, the realm of cultivated lands (grāmya), secondly the realm of wastelands and forests (jāṅgala/āraṇya), and thirdly the realm of spirits (būta-loka). Grāmya and jāṅgala/āraṇya form part of the tangible world, whereas būta-loka is their intangible counterpart. As grāmya is constantly threatened by encroachment, disease, hunger and death from jāṅgala and āraṇya, so is the tangible world under constant threat from the intangible world of the spirits. The world of the forest is the "world of the wild, unordered, uncontrolled, hungry beings of destruction".

The world of the forest and the world of the spirits are therefore seen as mirror images of each other. The wild animals threatening the human cultivator and his fields such as the tiger, the snake, the wild-boar, and the gaur, find their mirror images in their corresponding būtas Pilli, Naga, Paňjurli and Maisandaya.

The relationship between these three worlds is one of balance and moral order. If this order is upset by the humans, it is believed that the spirits become vicious. If the order is maintained, the spirits are believed to be supportive and benevolent. Thus, the spirits of Tulu culture are neither "good" nor "bad" as such; they are "neither cruel nor capricious. They methodically and persistently remind a lax humanity of the need for morality and the value of solidarity". Nobody is believed to be above the moral and cosmological norms of this threefold universe, not even the spirits or the gods. Thus the būtas are not whimsical or arbitrary in their judgement. The būtas are their patron's protectors with regard to a system of moral norms, not despite them.

Feudal relations of tribute and fealty mark the relations among the humans in the tangible world, among spirits in the intangible world and between humans and spirits across tangible and intangible worlds. While the world of humans is ruled by a mortal king, the world of the spirits is ruled by Bermeru, the lord of the forest and of the būtas. And just as the landed aristocracy depended on protection and support from their king, the world of humans depends on protection and support from the spirits. Thus once in a year at the time of kōla or nēma, the lord of the human world (patriarch, landlord, king) has to be reconfirmed in his authority by reporting to the spirit to which he is accountable. While the temporal lord's authority is dependent on the spirit; the authority of the spirit is guaranteed by the active participation of the villagers in the ritual. Thereby a certain degree of political legitimacy is upheld by the active participation of the villagers. Their withdrawal from the ritual can seriously affect the authority of the landlord.

As Claus observes, the principal mediators in this network of feudal transactions are communities who once upon a time may have led a liminal life between grāmya and jāṅgala/āraṇya.

== Worship ==
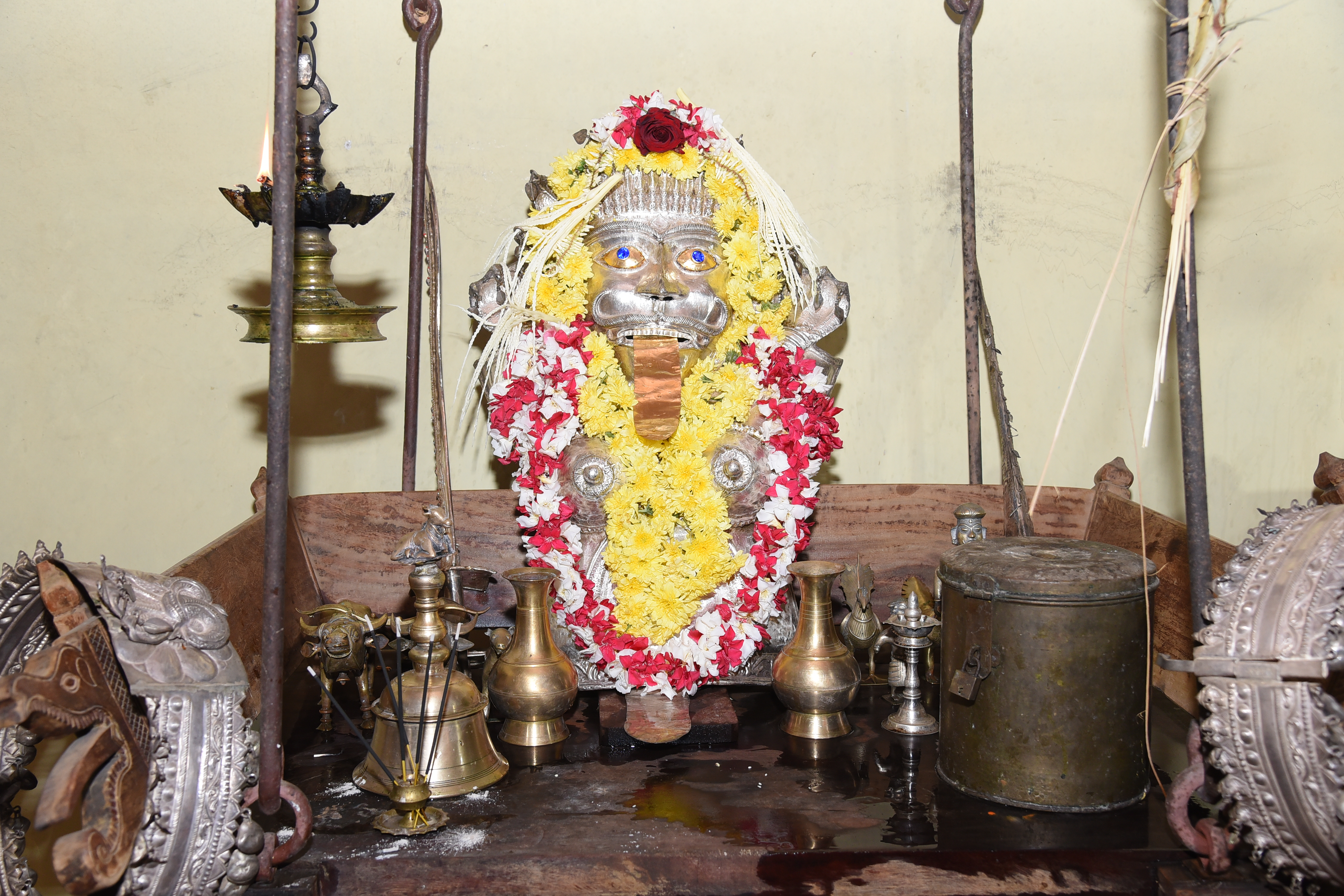
Murti of deity Jumadi

Today feudal relations no longer obtain and thus former ruling families no longer hold any political or judicial office. But still the village demands that they sponsor their annual kōla or nēma to honour the village deity. The people believe that the neglect of the spirits will make their life miserable. Even though they may have changed, būta kōla and daiva nēma still serve secular as well as religious purposes. In fact the two cannot be separated in a world where the tangible is suffused with the intangible. As the cosmology underlying the pāḍdanas suggests, the very order of the human world and the order of the spirit world are interdependent.

Būtas and daivas are not worshipped on a daily basis like mainstream Hindu gods. Their worship is restricted to annual ritual festivals, though daily pūjās may be conducted for the ritual objects, ornaments, and other paraphernalia of the būta. Unlike with the better-known Hindu gods of the purāṇic variety, būta worship is congregational.

== Secular function ==
The secular function of the kōla or nēma has been described as a "sacred court of justice" where traditional (feudal) moral ideals are brought to bear on difficult real-life situations. Būta kōlas and daiva nēmas are assemblies of the entire village. Thus they become an occasion to resolve conflicts in the village. The royal daiva (rājan-daiva) rules over a former small kingdom or large feudal estate. He or she is mostly the family deity of rich land-owning patrons of the Baṇṭ caste whose position and power they reflect, confirm and renew. The relationship between the būtas, manor heads, and the villagers forms a transactional network which reaffirms the caste hierarchy and power relations in a village. The duty assigned to every category is differential but based on mutuality. The manor head by staging the nēma seeks to symbolically proclaim himself to be the natural leader of the community.

The villagers offer sēva during the nēma in the form of service and prostrations and in doing so also offer their support to the nēma and their recognition of the leader's status. In return, the villagers expect justice and resolution of disputes by the daiva during the nēma. In the nēma, the leading manors offer a part of their farm products to the daiva, which are then redistributed to the villagers. The nēma thereby underlines the mutuality on which feudal relations used to be based and, in a limited way, takes care of the problem of social (distributive) justice. The būtas receive these offerings and in return give oracles and blessings to ensure the future prosperity of the village (humans, animals, fields). Finally, a part of these offerings will be distributed as prasāda among the heads of the guṭṭus and other villagers according to their ranks. The system of entitlements is constituted in, or embodied by, the mutual gifting activity between the būtas, as the ultimate owner of the land, and people in rituals, creating a transactional network among them.

== Ritual script ==
The script of the ritual changes from one nēmā to another, thus the following description is somewhat ideal-typical. The ritual begins with the paraphernalia of the būta being brought to the shrine which serves as a venue for the festival. They are placed on an altar or on a swinging cot, which is the insignium of a royal būta (rajan-daiva). The Nalike, Parava or Pambada medium prepares for the impersonation of the spirit with a recital of from the pāḍdana of the būta or daiva. After this, the medium starts putting on make-up and dressing up in his costume which may include an elaborate ani (a giant halo stringed to the back of the dancer). Finally, the medium is given the ornaments from the hoard of the shrine. As he enters the arena, the attendant of the spirit (pātri) gives him his sword, his bell and other paraphernalia and the patron (jajmān) gives him one or several burning torches. As the medium begins to dance, the spirit enters his body. Two people hold the torches along with the medium at all times. Thus, the entrance of spirit into this world is restrained. The medium's dance gains more force as the possession continues. He brings the torches dangerously close to his body. The jajmān now stands in a ritualistic circle on the ground with his assistants and offerings are made to the būta. These offerings often include the sacrifice of a chicken whose blood is sprinkled on the ground to enhance the fertility of the land. These sacrificial acts are followed by offerings of puffed rice, beaten rice, coconut pieces, bananas, ghee, betel leaf, and areca nut. In the subsequent court of justice the spirit is approached by the villagers for blessings or asked to help resolve conflicts. The judicial program typically starts once the initial rituals are finished. Complaints and judgements are made orally. The būta issues the judgement after hearing the sides of the plaintiff as well as the defendant, if both are present. The būta's justice must be referrable to general principles. "He may take a stand, he cannot take sides". While the būta may take the opinions of the village headman and other eminent persons into consideration, the ultimate judgement rests with the būta. Sometimes judgements are also issued by the tossing of betel leaves and the counting of flower petals (usually areca flower). Particularly difficult cases may also be adjourned to the next year by the būta. Some common disputes that come up are related to land issues, family feuds, questions of honour, robbery, debt, mortgage, breach of contract etc. In cases of theft where the offender is unknown, the būta may ask for a certain offering before finding the thief. At times the victim offers the entire value of the stolen goods to the būta. If the thief is found and penalised, the person is made to pay to the plaintiff a sum that is more than the value of the goods stolen. If the būta feels that the thief shows repentance, the gravity of the penalty could be reduced.

== Medium ==
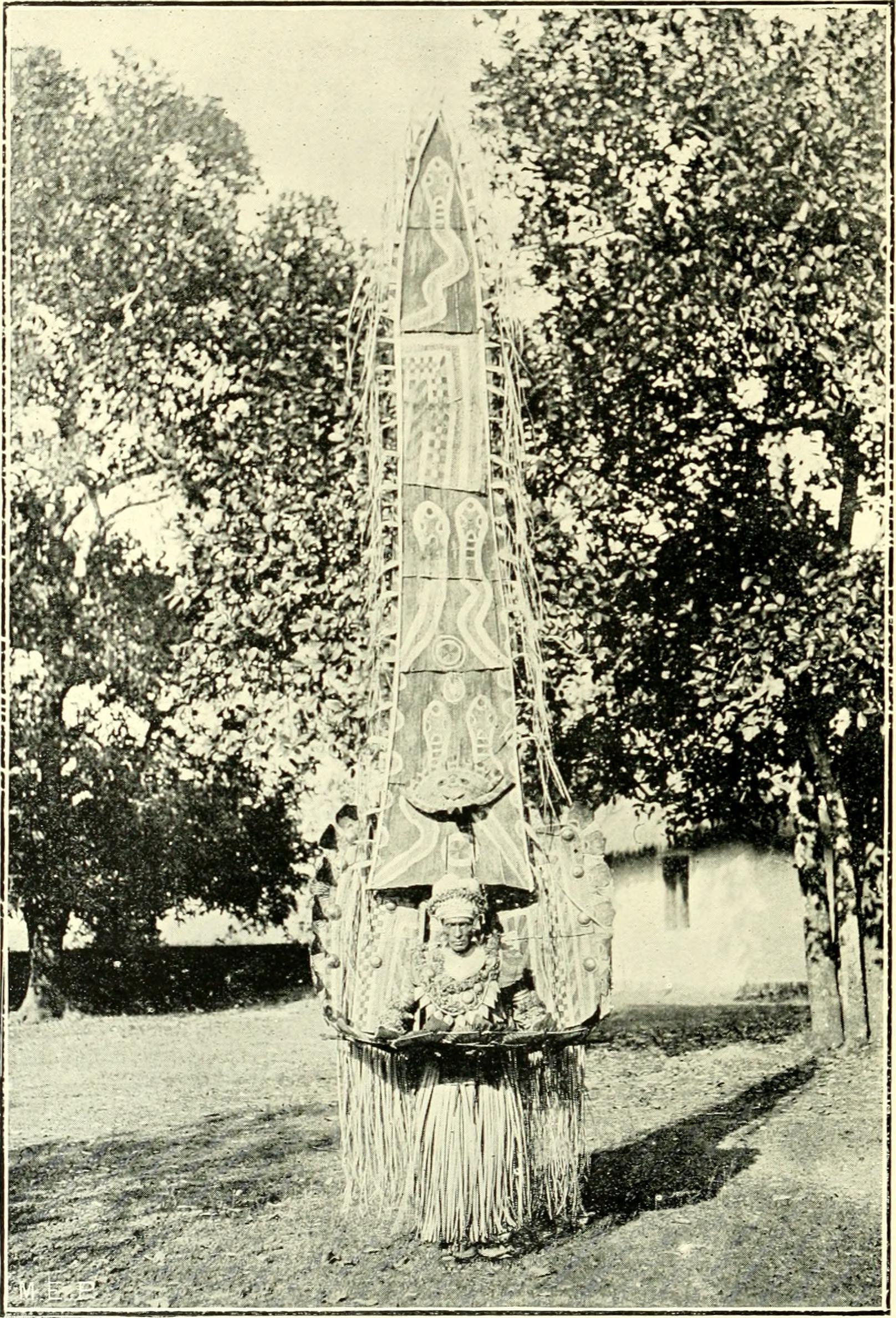
Buta Kola dancer from the Parava caste. c. 1909

The art of being a channel/medium is believed to be learned. Young boys belonging to the Pambada, Parava, Nalike castes attend rituals where their kin is performing; and they help out with shredding the coconut leaves for the garment of the channel/medium, holding the mirror while the channel/medium is putting on the make up etc. They learn the art of the performance by observing the performance of their kin and trying to mimic it. Along with being able to mimic the way their kin performed, what is essential to be a successful channel/medium is also the aptitude of being possessed by the deity. There are certain rules the channel/medium needs to follow to prepare his body for the possession. This may include being a vegetarian and not drinking alcohol. The channel/medium feels the sudden spirit possession only for a few seconds but after that he is filled with the deity's energy that lets him behave as the deity for the entire ritual.

There are two types of mediators between the spirits and the humans. The first type of mediator is known as the pātri. These are members of middle castes such as Billava (toddy tappers, formerly also bow-men). The second type of mediator ("channels/mediums") typically belong to scheduled castes such as Pambada, Parava or Nalike. While the pātri has only a sword and a bell as ritual tools, the channel/medium uses makeup, ornaments, masks etc.

== Pāḍdanas ==
Pāḍdanas are songs that form a major part of Tuluva oral literature. Much of the body of this literature has been built on the legends of the būtas and daivas. Pāḍdanas have numerous variations for the same narrative. As in other epic traditions, there is no single author. Pāḍdanas are orally transmitted and recited. The language of the pāḍdanas is old Tulu. Some famous examples are the Siri-Kumar Pāḍdanas and the Koti and Chennayya Pāḍdanas. The pāḍdanas sung by women while planting paddy are referred to as "field songs".

The pāḍdanas recite the origins of the spirits and deities. This is one way for the rituals to reconstruct the past and render a legitimization to it. The singers act as the indigenous narrators of the history of the native land. The pāḍdanas also stand in opposition to the puranic, male based principles as they highlight the feminine principles of mother earth. The pāḍdanas also reflect multi-socio-cultural background shifts (for example, the move from Matrilineal system to Patrilineal system). The older sense of cosmology is retained through the pāḍdanas.

== In popular culture ==
- The 1975 Kannada movie Chomana Dudi was the first movie to have a reference to the demi-god Panjurli.
- Koti Chennaya, a 2007 movie made in Tulu, which went on to win the Best Tulu Film at the 54th National Film Awards.
- Deyi Baidethi, a 2019 Tulu-language historical film on the life of Deyi Baideti, mother of Koti and Chennayya.
- The 2022 Kannada film Kantara and the 2025 sequel Kantara: Chapter 1 showcase the portrayal of Buta Kola in their main storyline. As a result of the movie, the Government of Karnataka introduced a monthly allowance for performers of Buta Kola who are over 60 years of age.

== Gallery ==
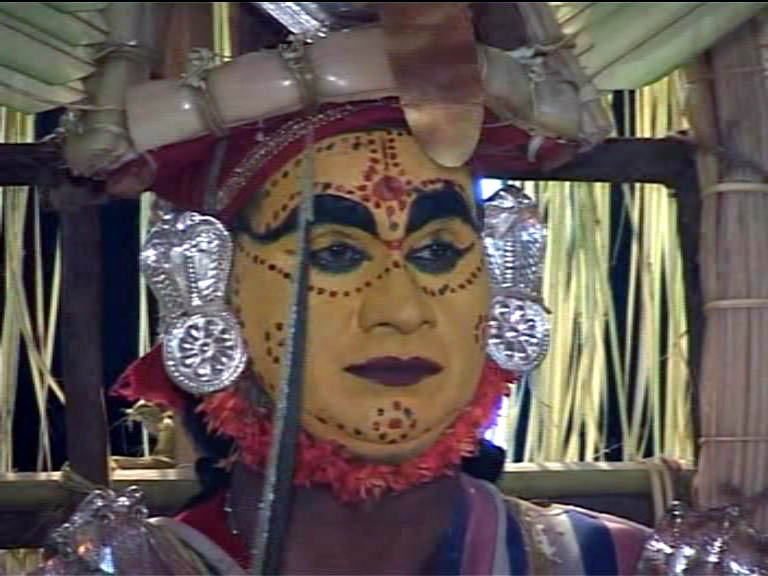
Channel/medium with the makeup of Jumadi, a popular deity of the Būta/Bhoota cult

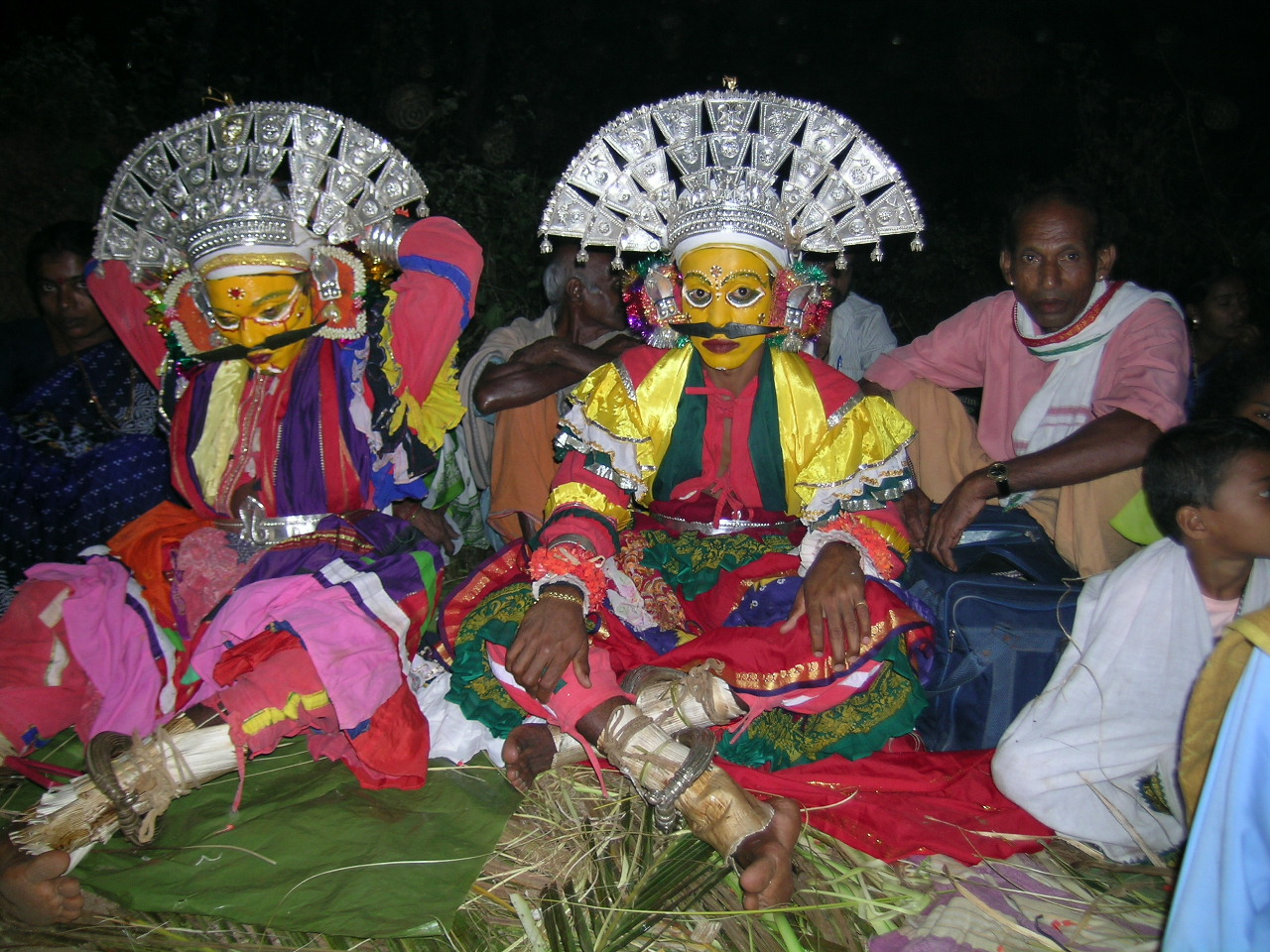
Channel/medium of Koti and Chennayya preparing himself with the makeup and tying the ornaments before the start of the Bhūta Kōlā ceremony

Channel/medium tying the siri — palm leaves skirt around his waist

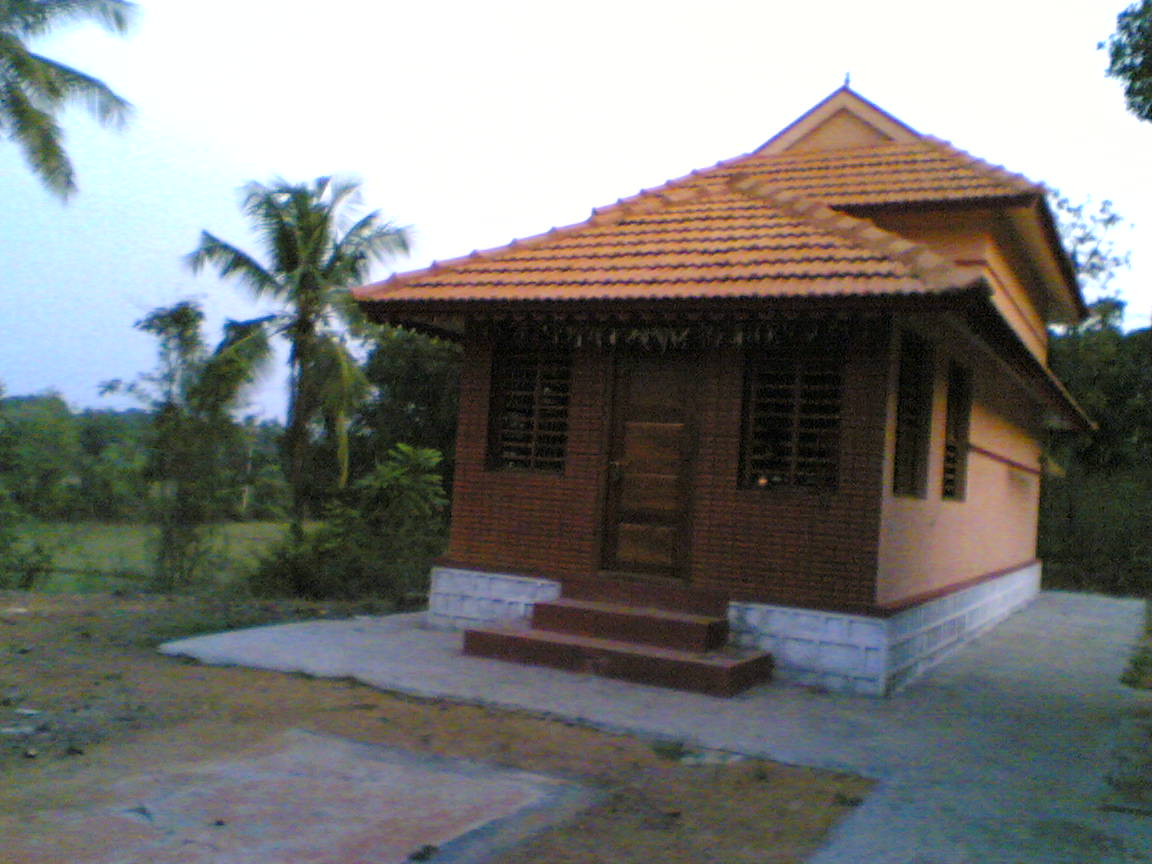
Household shrine of Bellē Badagumanē, Belle, Udupi

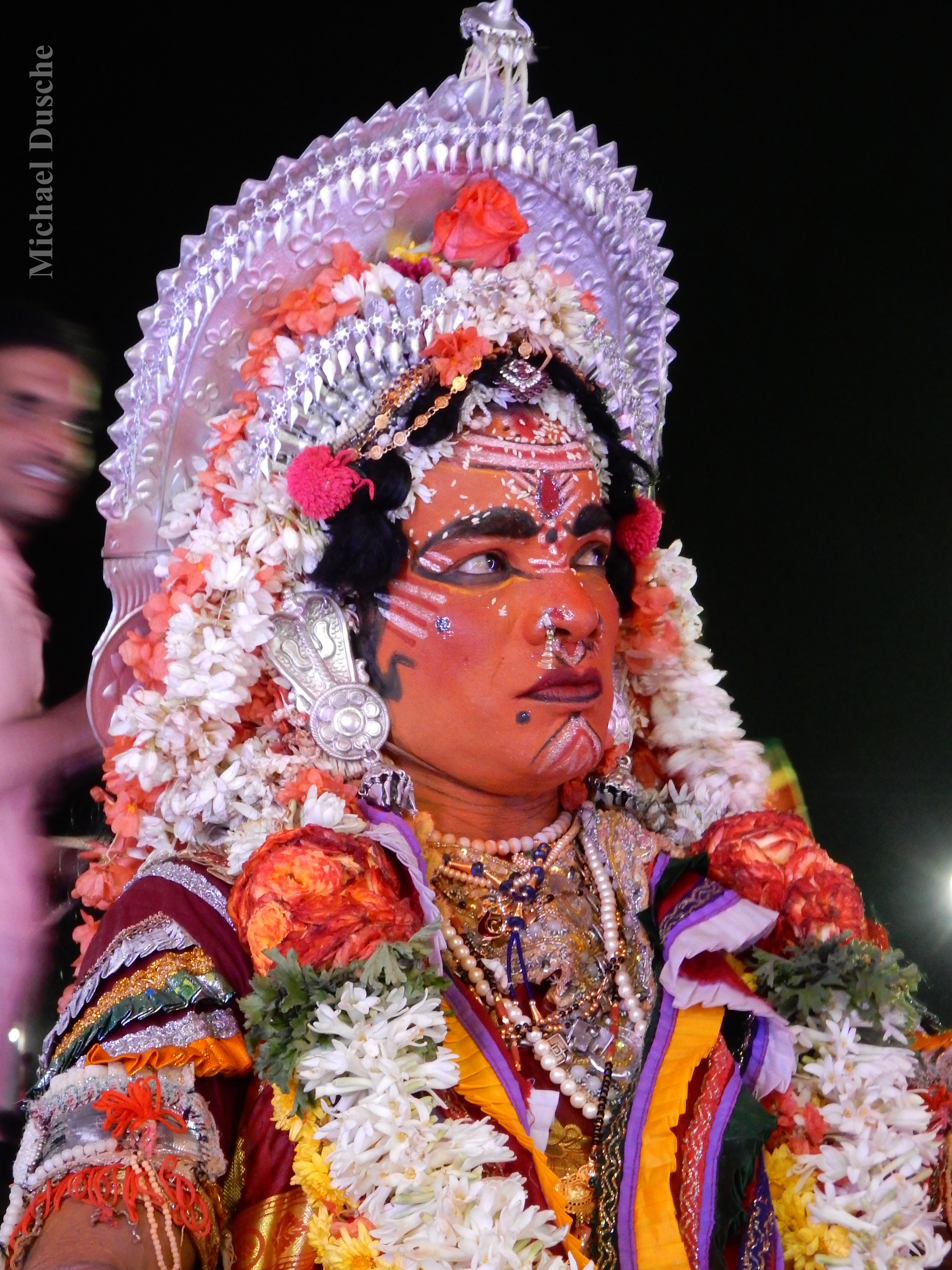
Kallurti Bhoota, the female counterpart of Kalkuda Bhoota who is a deified spirit of a sculptor

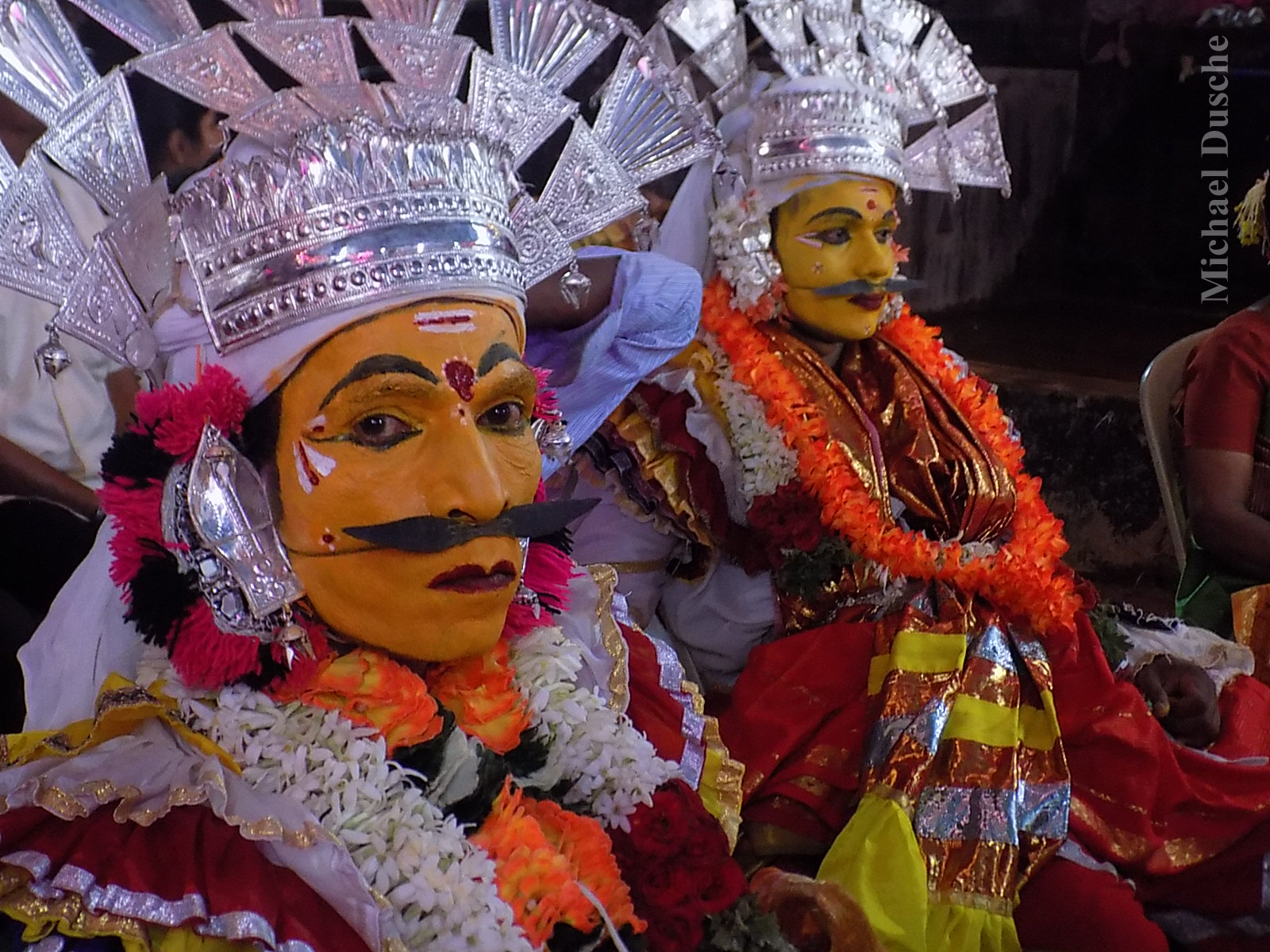
Koti and Chennayya two heroes of the Billava community

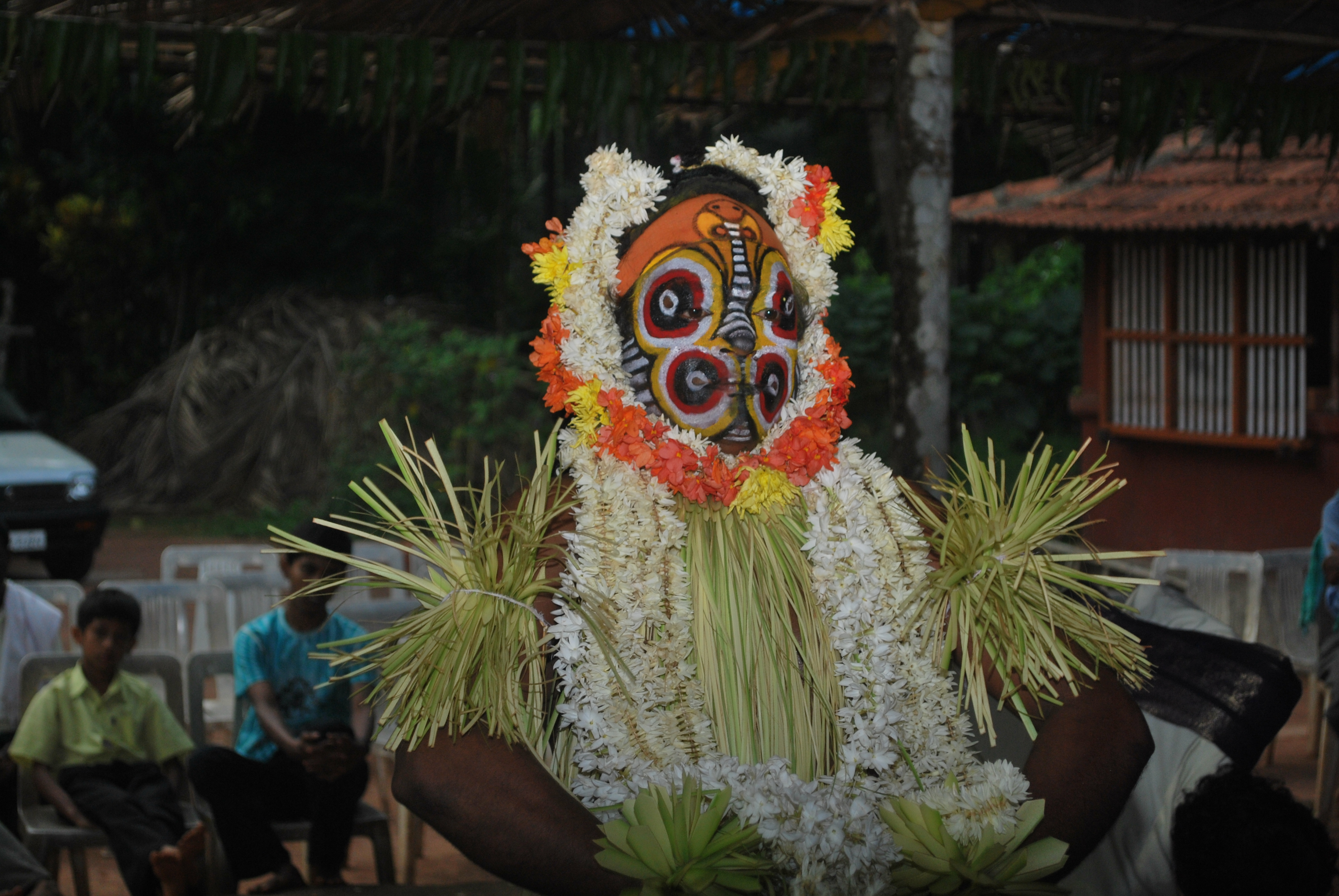
Channel/medium of the wild deity Guligā

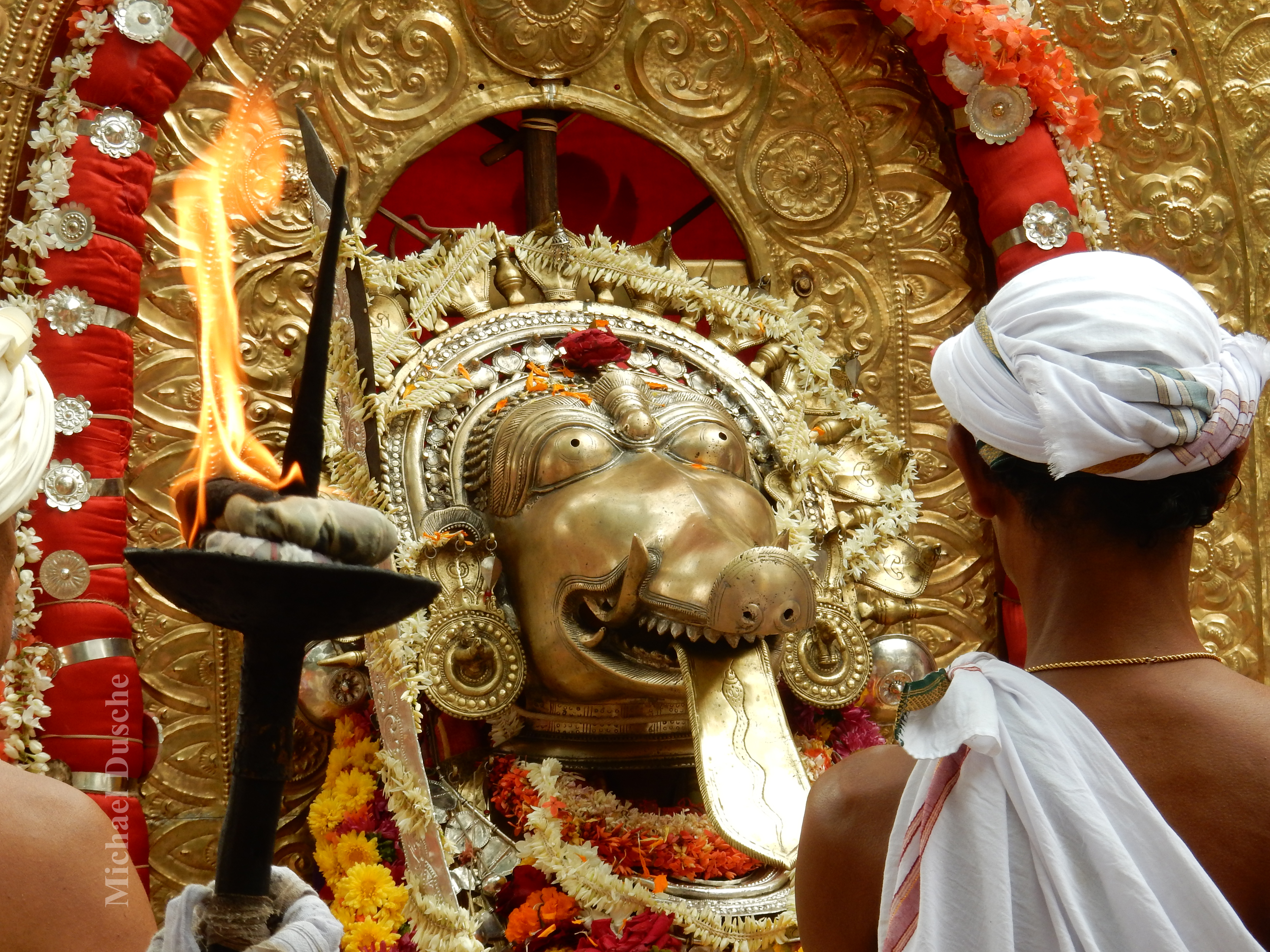
Malarāya Daivā, Kasargod, Kerala

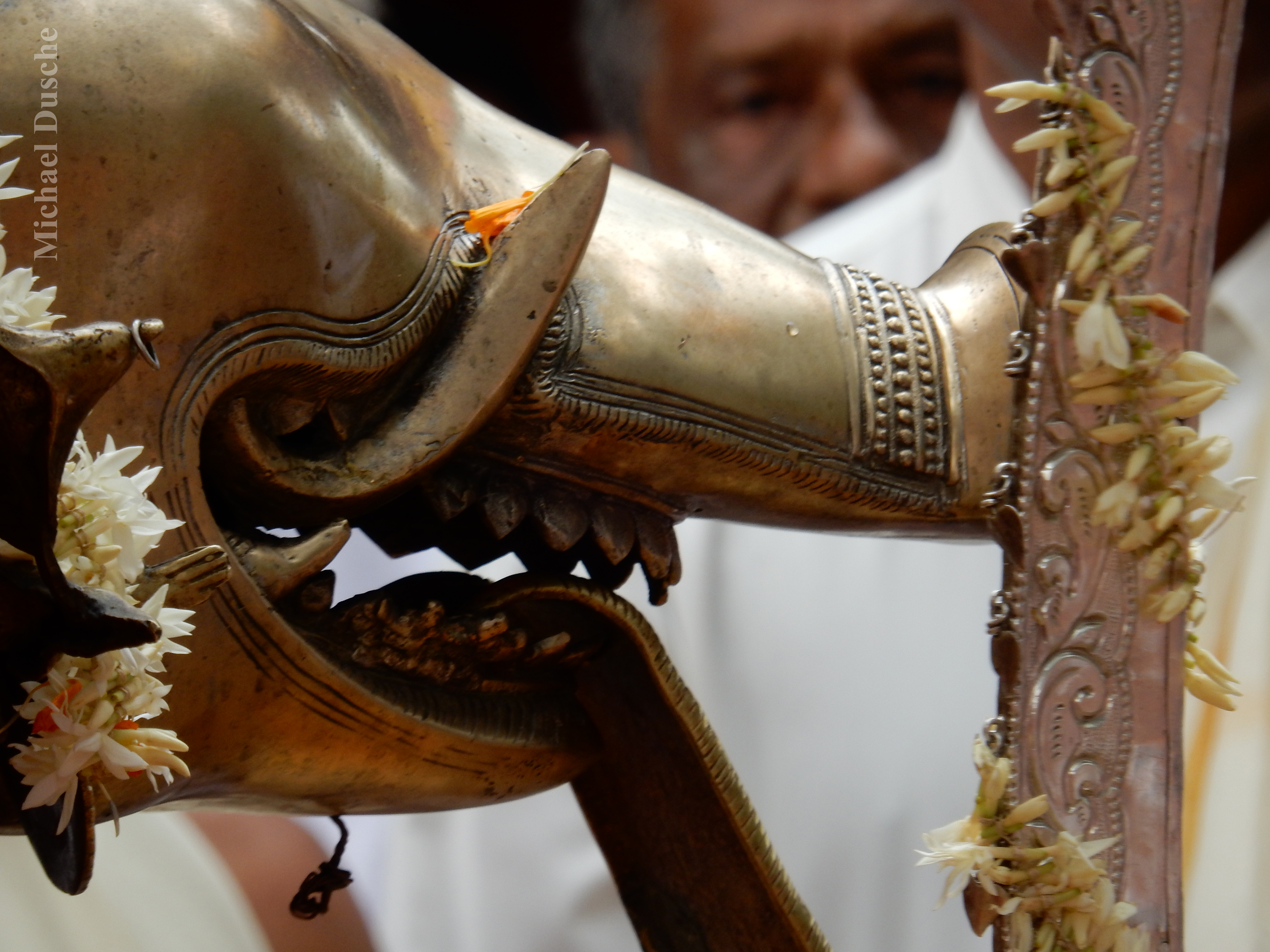
Malarāyā's Mask

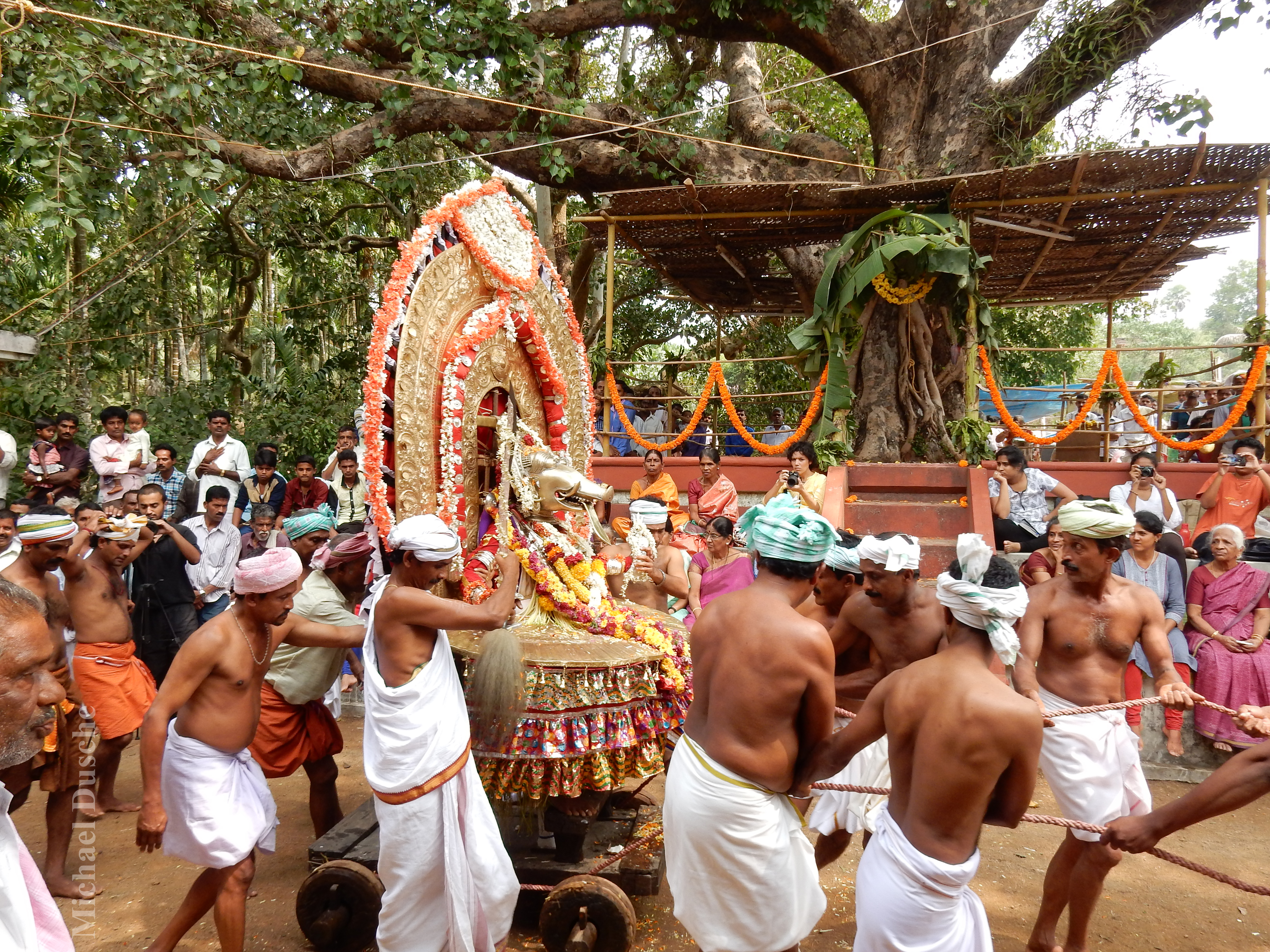
Malarāya Daiva on white boar chariot

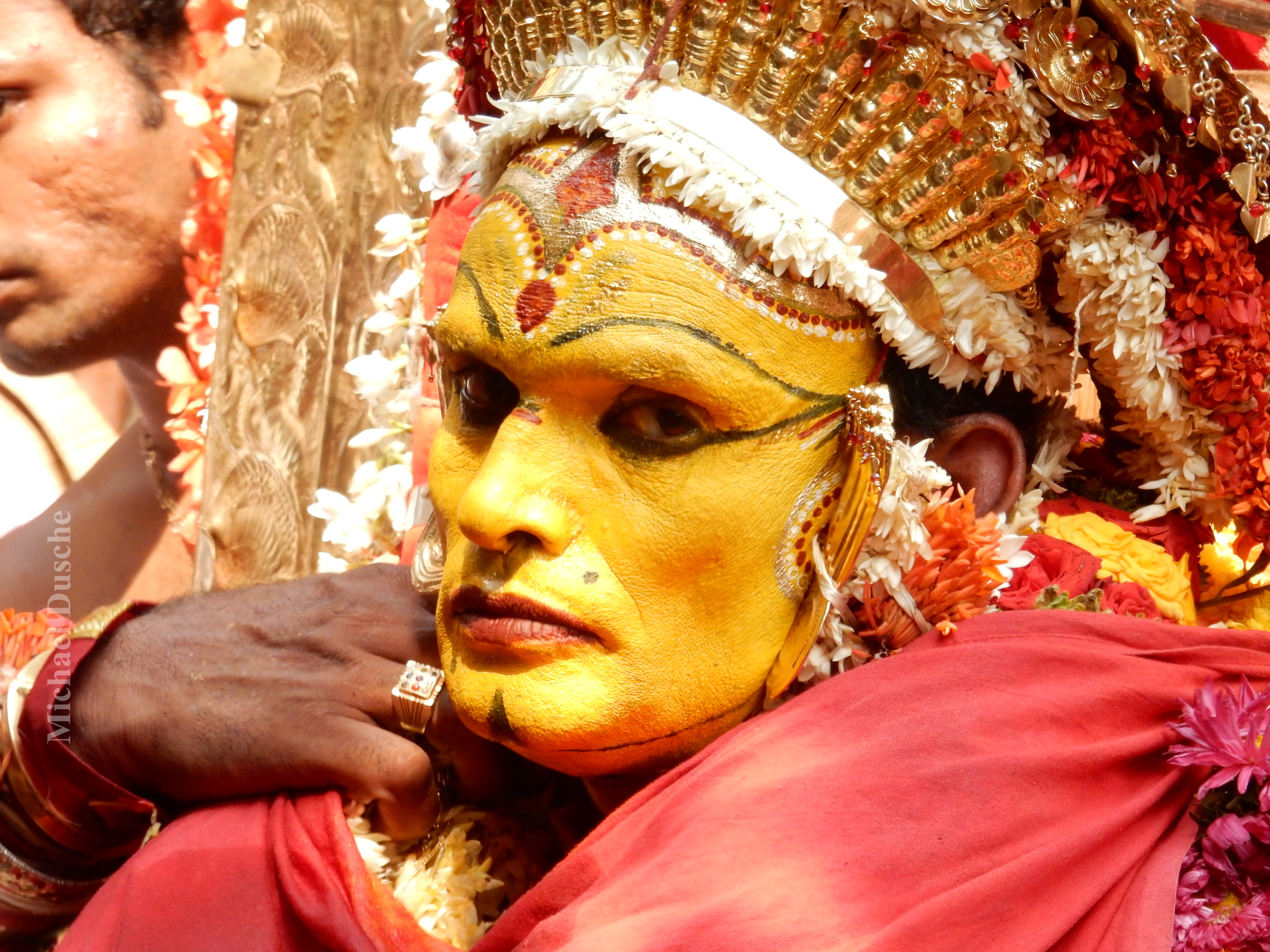
Channel/medium of Malarāyā

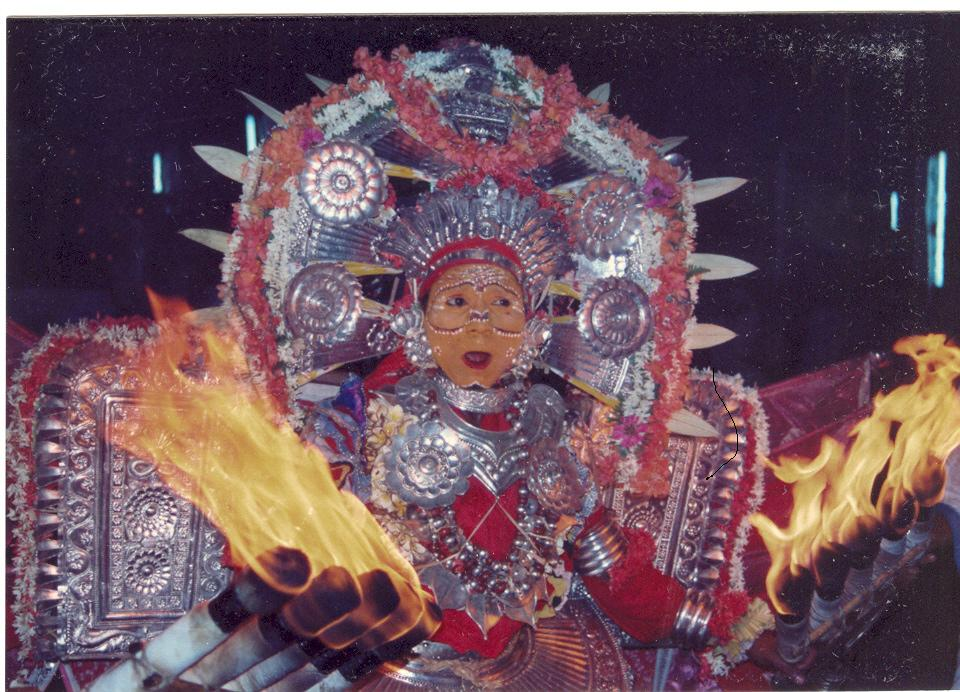
Channel/medium of Ullālthi, the patron deity of the Banga Arasa princely family

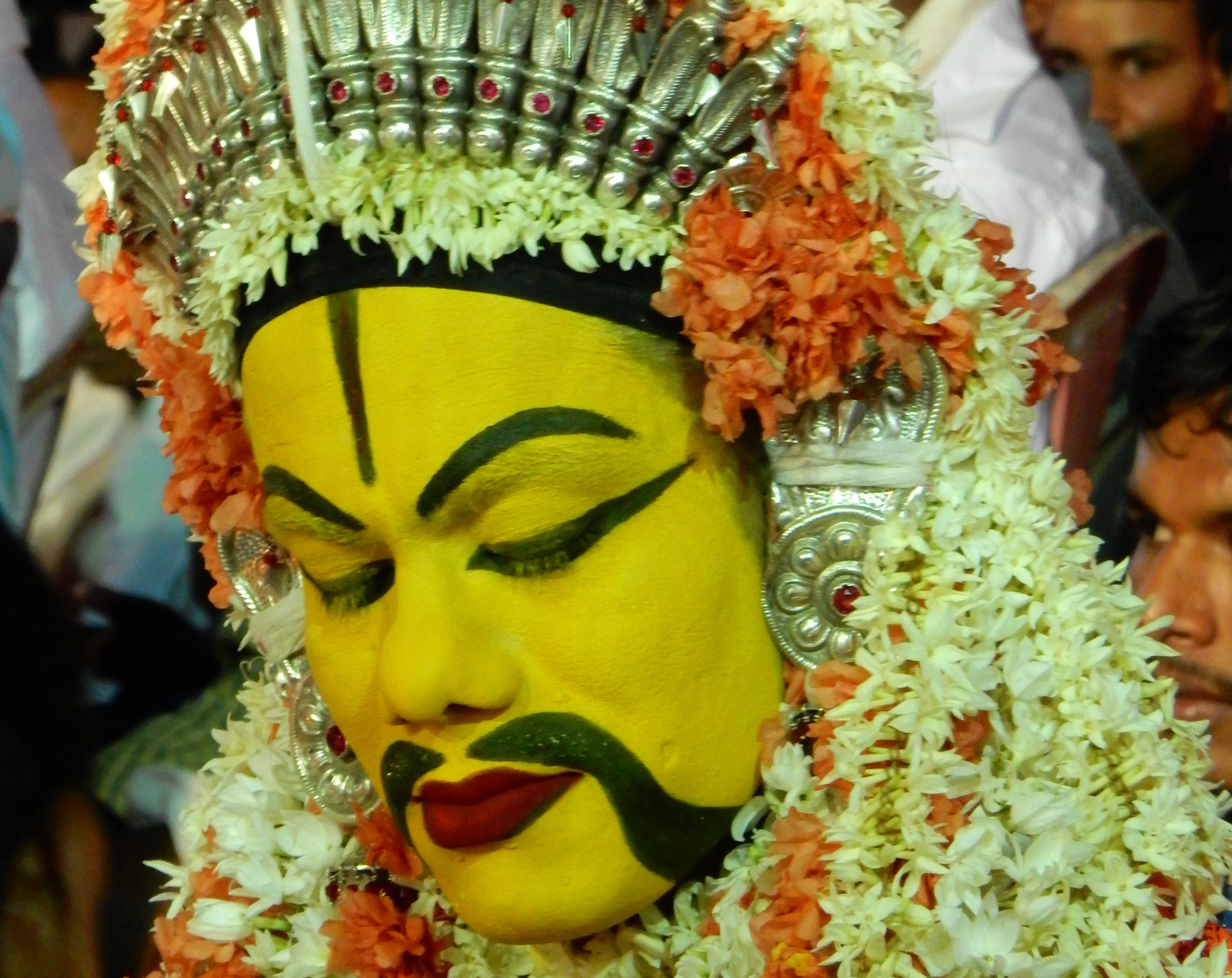
Channel/medium of Bobbarāyā Swāmi, the patron deity of the Mogaveera community

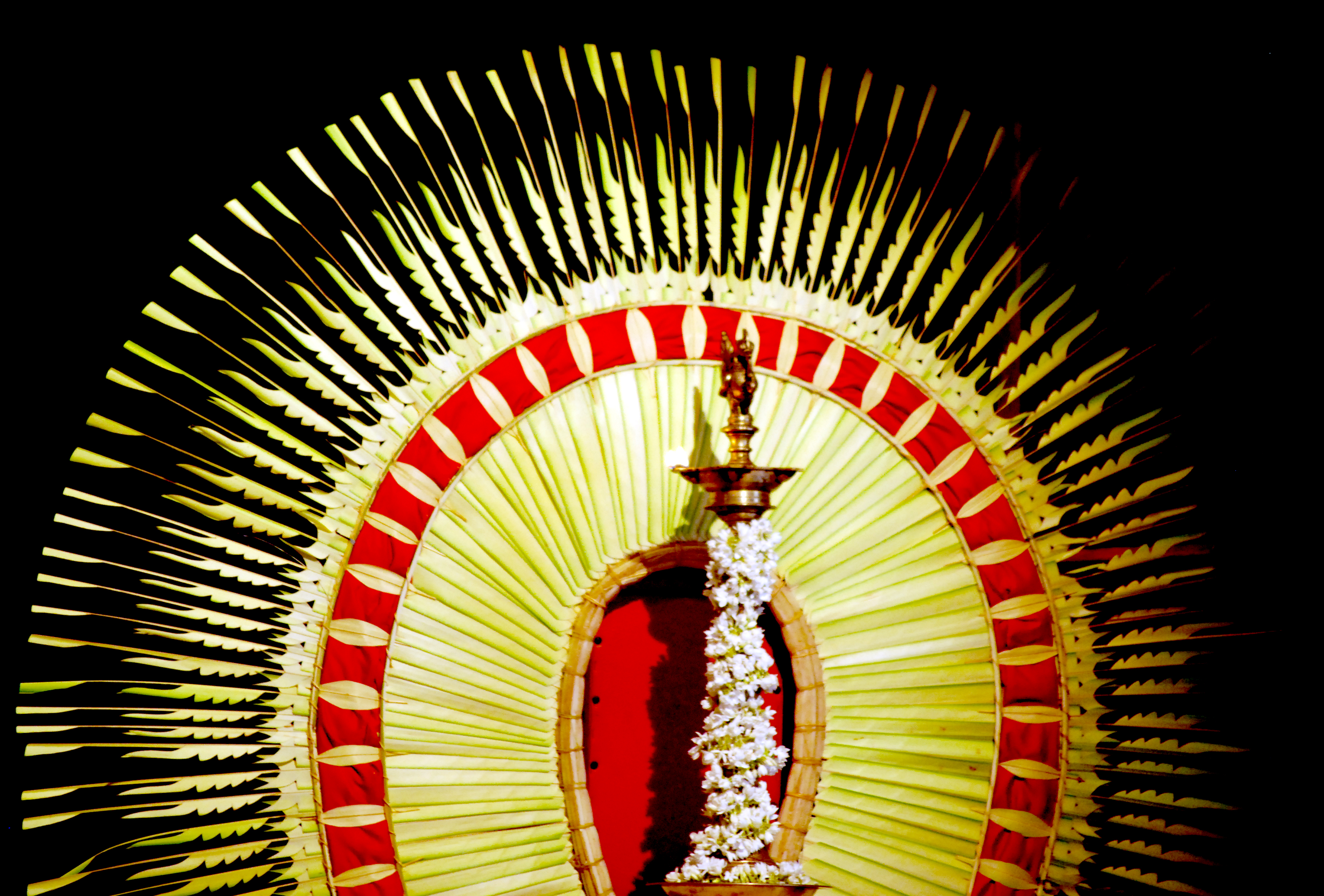
This Halo like object is used by the channel/medium while performing the ritual dance.

== See also ==
- Aati kalenja – Traditional folk art of the Tulu people of Tulu Nadu, India
- Tulunadu – Region and proposed state in southern India
- Nagamandala – Form of cobra worship in Karnataka and Kerala, India
- Barkur
- Tuluvas – Dravidian ethnic group of southwestern India
- Yakshagana – Theatre form in India
