= Koti and Chennayya =

Legendary Tulu heroes

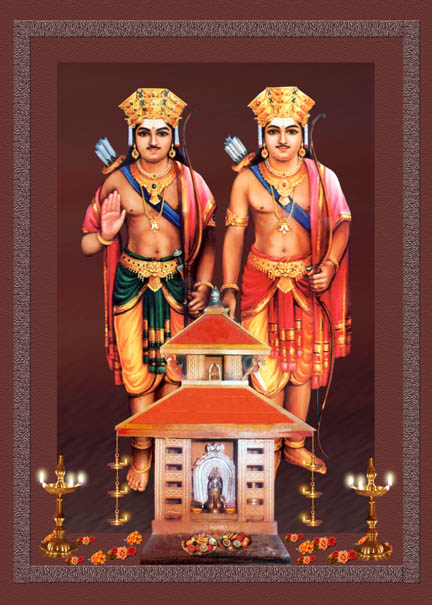
Koti & Chennaya (Circa 1556 - 1591 CE), Twin Heroes of Tulu Nadu (Karnataka, India)

Koti and Chennayya (Tulu: ಕೋಟಿ ಚೆನ್ನಯ್ಯ Kōṭi Cennayya) (circa 1556 A.D to 1591 A.D.) are legendary Tuluva twin heroes characterized in the Tulu epic of the same name, which is considered one of the two truly long epics in the Tulu language. The birthplace of Koti and Chennaya is Padumale in Puttur taluk, Dakshina Kannada. The story of these heroes may be taken to roughly five hundred years back, when reference to Ballads were made in the Tulu Padana. Koti and Chennayya were born to the Deyi Baidethi of the Kirodian bari (Kirodiyyanaya) of the Billava (Bydyer) people of Tulu Nadu. Owing to the brothers' heroic deeds, they are worshipped and remembered as protectors. They died in combat near Yenmoor. Memorial temples called garadi "gymnasiums" have been built in the name of Koti and Chennayya all over Tulu Nadu.

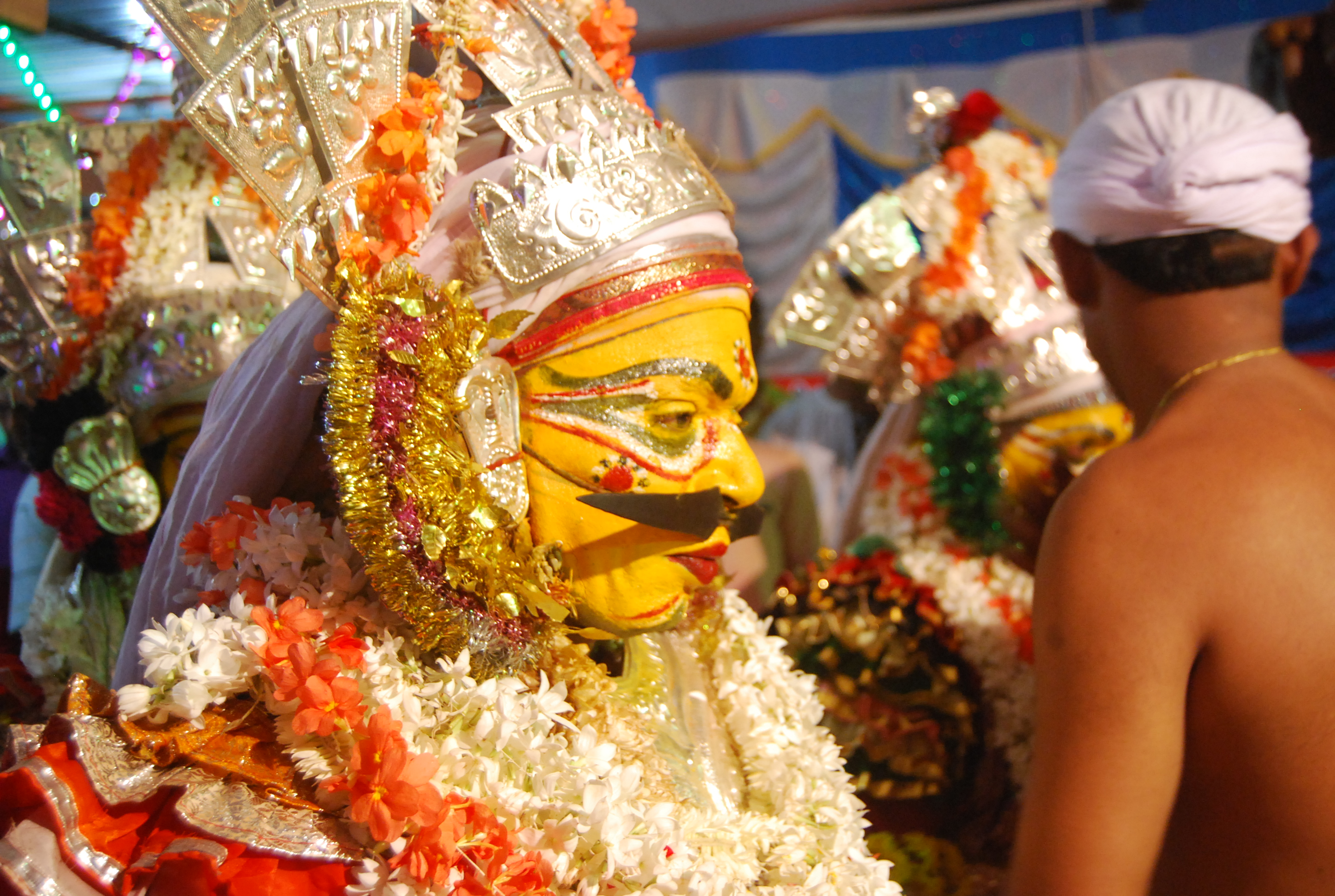
Koti and Chennayya

== Religious places ==
- Padumale, the birthplace of Koti and Chennayya.
- Shree Brahma Baiderkala Garodi, Yenmoor, Maha samadhi of Koti and Chennayya.
- Shree Brahma Baidarkala Garadi Kshetra or popularly known as 'Garodi' is a religious place for Tulu community, dedicated to Koti and Chennayya at Garodi in Kankanadi.

== In modern culture ==
- A movie based on the lives of Koti and Chennayya was made in Kannada and Tulu languages as Koti Chennayya
- Koti Chennaya, a 2007 movie made in Tulu which went to win the 54th National Film Awards.
- A project of TV serial in Kannada language based on Koti Chennaya was telecasted in DD chandana, a Kannada channel
- In 2019 another movie was made in Tulu as "Deyi Baidethi" in 2019.

== See also ==
- Aati kalenja
- Yakshagana
