= Shree Brahma Baidarkala Garadi Kshetra =

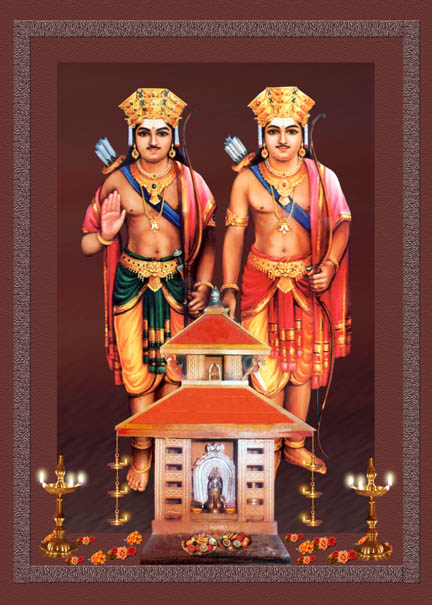
- Koti & Chennaya (Circa 1556 A.D to 1591 A.D.) - the main deities

- Location within Karnataka Location within India

Religion
- Affiliation: Hinduism
- District: Mangalore
- Deity: Koti & Chennayya

Location
- Location: Kankanady, Mangalore
- State: Karnataka
- Country: India
- Interactive map of Shree Brahma Baidarkala Garadi Kshetra
- Coordinates: 12°52′08″N 74°52′20″E

Website
- kankanadygarodi.in

Shree Brahma Baidarkala Garadi Kshetra, or popularly known as Garodi, is a temple in Mangalore dedicated to the twin cultural heroes of Tulu Nadu region, Koti and Chennayya (circa 1556 A.D to 1591 A.D.). The temple is located at Kankanadi, adjacent to the Mangalore-Bangalore highway just 4 km away from the heart of Mangalore. This temple is of much significance to the Tuluva community.
