= Parameswara =

Parameswara may refer to:

- Parameshwara (god), a Hindu concept literally meaning the Supreme God, usually referring to Shiva
- Parameswara (king) (1344–1424), Sultan of Malacca
- Parameshvara (1360–1425), Indian mathematician and astronomer

== See also ==
- Parameshwara (disambiguation)
- Parameswaravarman I, Pallava King
- Paramesvaravarman II, Pallava King
