= Deyi Baidethi =

- Poster
- Directed by: Suryoday Narayan Permapalli
- Written by: Suryoday Narayan Permapalli
- Produced by: Suryoday Narayan Permapalli
- Starring: Seetha Kote; Kaajal Kunder; Amit Rao; Chetan Rai Mani
- Cinematography: Ravi Suvarna; Harish Kakkunje
- Edited by: Mohan
- Music by: B Bhaskar Rao; Manikanth Kadri
- Production company: Sankri Motion Pictures
- Release date: 11 January 2019
- Country: India
- Language: Tulu

Deyi Baideti – Gejjegiri Nandanodu is a 2019 Indian Tulu-language historical film directed and produced by Suryoday Narayan Permapalli. The film is under the banner of Sankri Motion Pictures. The film's soundtrack was composed by B Bhaskar Rao, while the score was composed by Manikanth Kadri. The film was released on 11 January 2019 and won Karnataka State Film Awards for Best Regional Language Film, Best Director, and Best Singer.

== Plot ==
The film is an adaptation of the life of Deyi Baideti, mother of Koti and Chennayya, the twin warriors of Tulunadu, who fought valiantly on battle ground and died about five hundred years ago.

== Cast ==
- Soujanya Hegde
- Kaajal Kunder
- Seetha Kote
- Amit Rao
- Chetan Rai Mani
- Manju Bhashini
- Kirloskar Satya

== Release ==
The film was released on January 11, 2019. Deyi Baidethi became the first Tulu film to be screened at Mysuru Dasara Film Festival in 2019.

== Awards ==
The film won awards for Best Regional Language Film, Best Director, and Best Singer at Karnataka State Film Awards 2018.
