= Aati kalenja =

Traditional folk art of the Tulu people of Tulu Nadu, India

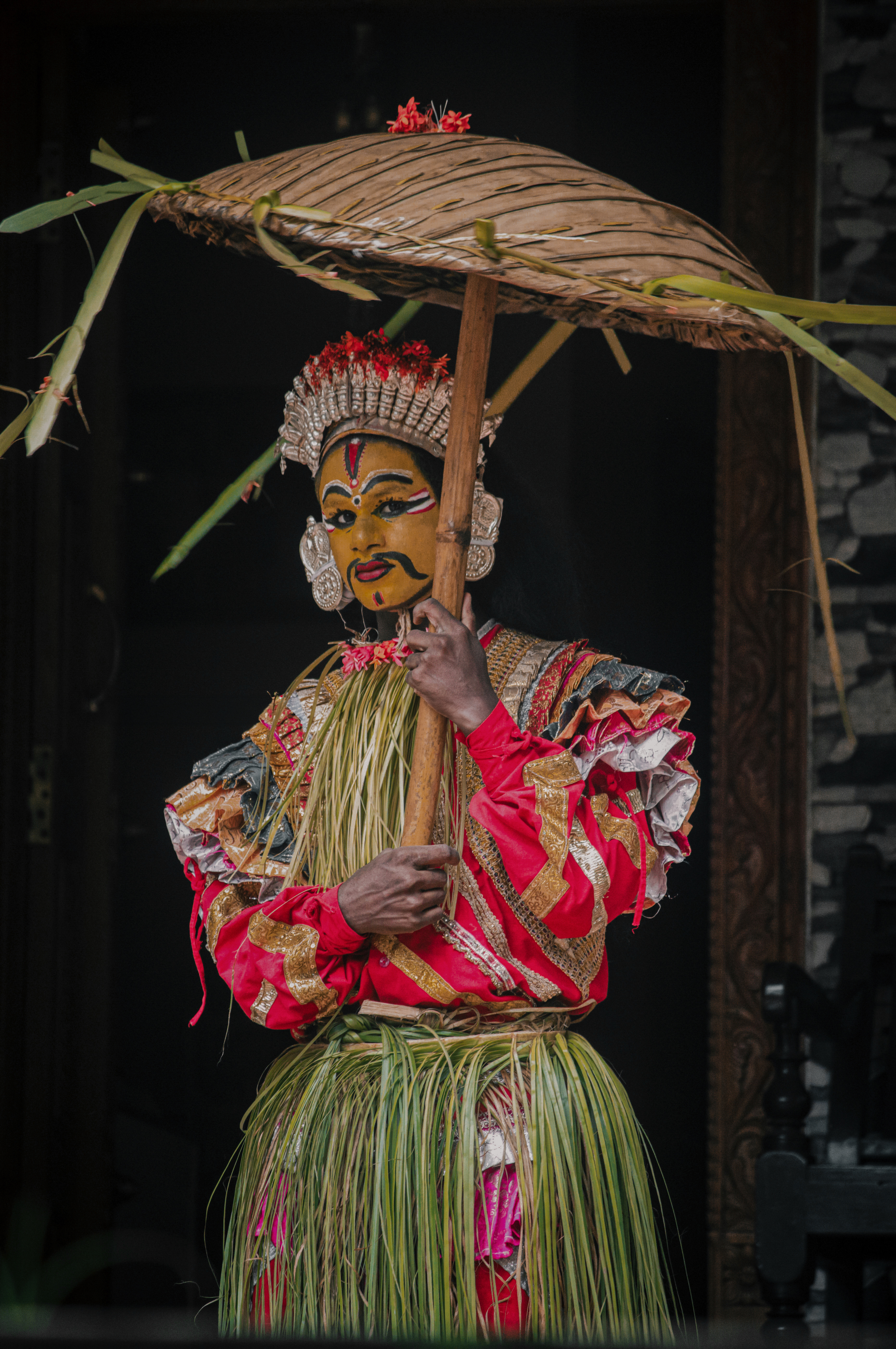
Aati Kalenja

Aati Kalenja

Aati Kalenja is an ancient traditional folk art form practiced by the Tulu people from the region of Tulu Nadu, India, which is believed to bring prosperity during Aati, which is one of the months in the Tulu calendar. It is usually performed during July and August.

== Background ==
Tulu Nadu is known for its rich traditions. In the villages of Tulu Nadu, where agriculture plays a significant role in the socio-economic life of the Tulu people, members of the Nalike community visit people's homes in colourful attire, masquerading as Kalenja. In return, people would offer rice, vegetables and money to artistes. It is believed that during the month of Aati, nature's spirit Kalenja descends on Earth to bless the land and its people. The performance begins on poove - the day before the full moon, and continues till the end of the month.

It is believed that Aati Kalenja brings the positive energy which would ward off evil spirits and diseases. Aati is when there is a heavy rainfall which would destroy the crops. During this season, heavy rain causes not only disasters but also diseases as the season is conducive to the insects and pests to breed. So man is more prone to sickness in this season and poverty due to lack of work for the people who are solely depending on the agriculture. This is the reason for Aati being considered a month of disasters. This is when the man starts pleading and pleasing the nature to be merciful towards him. This could well be called the origin of the Aati Kalenja culture in Tulu Nadu.

== The Costume ==
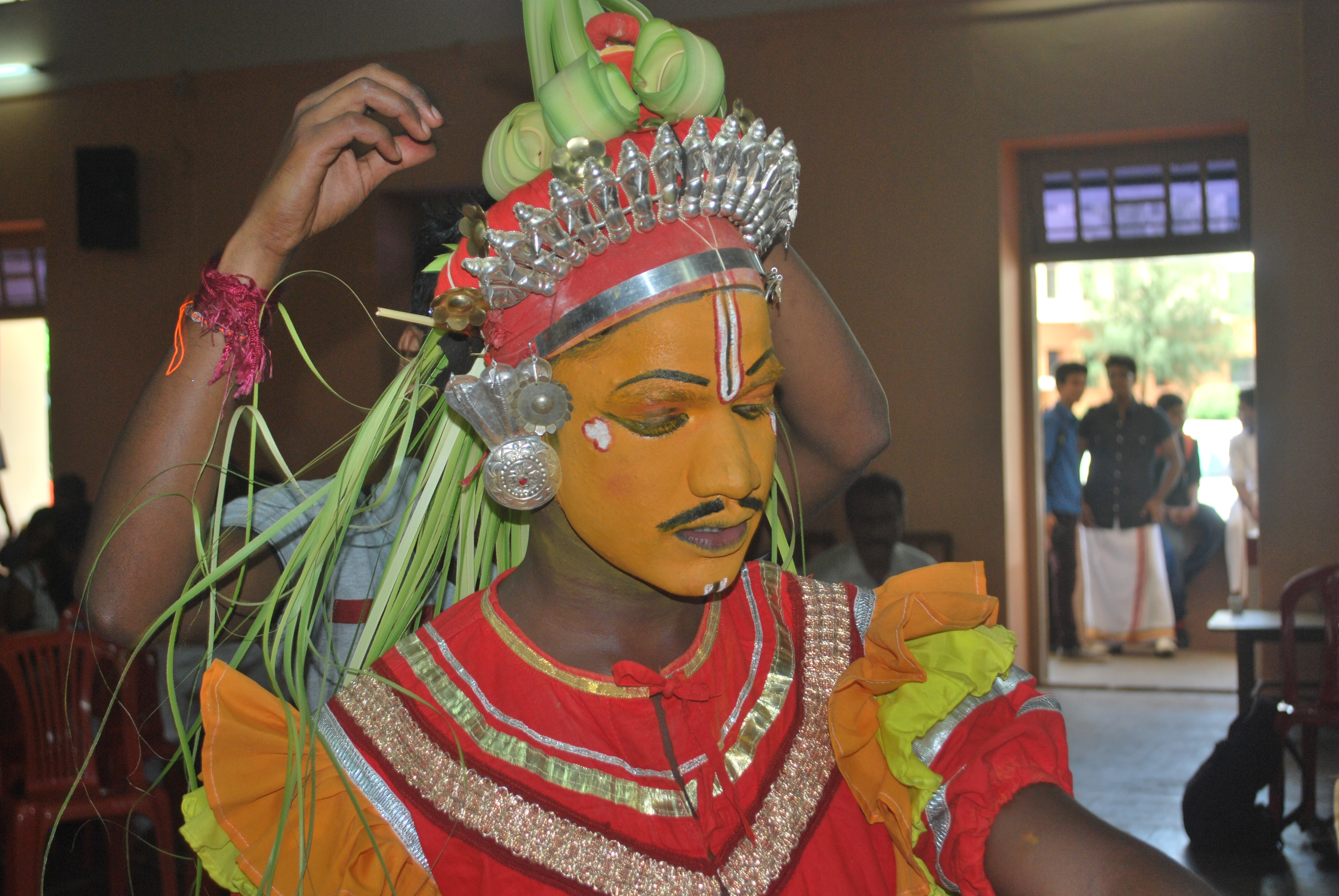
Preparations of the artist

Headgear and painted faces are the main attractions of kalenja's eco-friendly costume which is made of leaves and flowers. The person who masquerades as Kalenja makes the headgear using stems of Ixora coccinea (kepula in Tulu language). They adorn themselves with costumes made of tender palms of the coconut tree, anklets, colourful clothes and a long cap made up of Areca spate etc. The headgear, also called the mudi, is then decorated with flowers. They paint their face with different colours and designs.

The ‘skirt’ which flows down his waist is another piece of art. It is made of tender fronds of coconut and are interlaced with banana sheath strands. Later, he paints his face and hands in various colours and designs and gets ready for house visits. The image of Aati Kalenja, holding an umbrella of dry palm leaves, makes for a spectacular viewing.

The costume differs by region, In Sullia, Aati Kalenja dancer wears a face mask which is made from the spathe of an areca nut branch.

== The Ritual ==
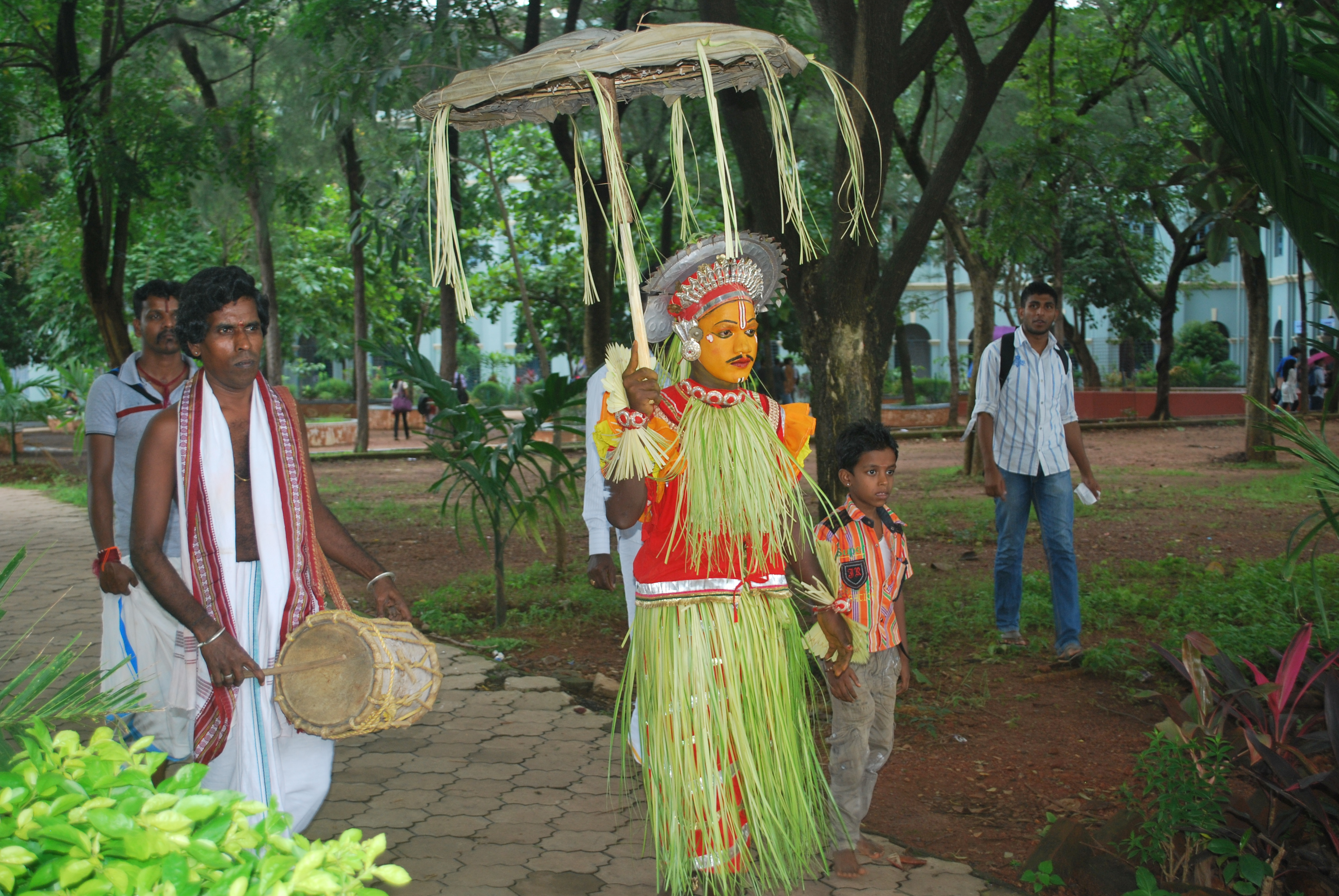
Aati Kalenja with accompanist

Aati Kalenja visits houses and carries out a ritual of sprinkling water mixed with Charcoal, Turmeric powder and Tamarind to do away with any misfortune that might have befallen on the family and the cattle. He dances to the beats of the drum called tembere which is of great significance in culture of Tulu Nadu.

The accompanist beats the drum and recites the song, "Aateek Baththe Aati Kalenja", narrating the story of the spirit. As a reward for expunging the evil that surrounds, household members give him rice. Aati Kalenja is also considered as a traditional healer who at times dispenses medicinal herbs to overcome illness.

== Food ==
Ambade (Hog plum), Kanile (Bamboo shoot), Paagile (wild bitter gourd), Thojank (Cassia tora), Thimare (both wild greens), wild Jackfruit, drumstick leaves and Colocasia leaves are some of the locally available vegetables that are used in the season.

== In modern days ==
With changing times the situation is very different now: development, education, technology and increased employment opportunities have led to the disappearance of this ancient ritualistic folk dance. Reduction in paddy cultivation too contributed to the disappearance of the tradition. This decade-old ritual is on the verge of extinction.

Karnataka Tulu Sahitya Academy former president Vaman Nandavara said that Nalike community members in the city are not keen on continuing with the tradition as they get more job opportunities due to reservation and urbanization. "Parents of Nalike community members dress their children as Aati Kalenja and make them dance to the tunes of paddana (traditional Tulu songs) in front of houses. Nowadays, children too are hesitant as they concentrate on education".

In spite of it, Aati Kalenja remains an integral part of the folk culture of the Tulu Nadu region and one can witness this folk dance only in the interior pockets of Tulu Nadu, during Aati days.

== See also ==
- Bhuta Kola
- Yakshagana
