= Kankanadi =

Kankanadi Kankanady
- Commercial & Residential Locality
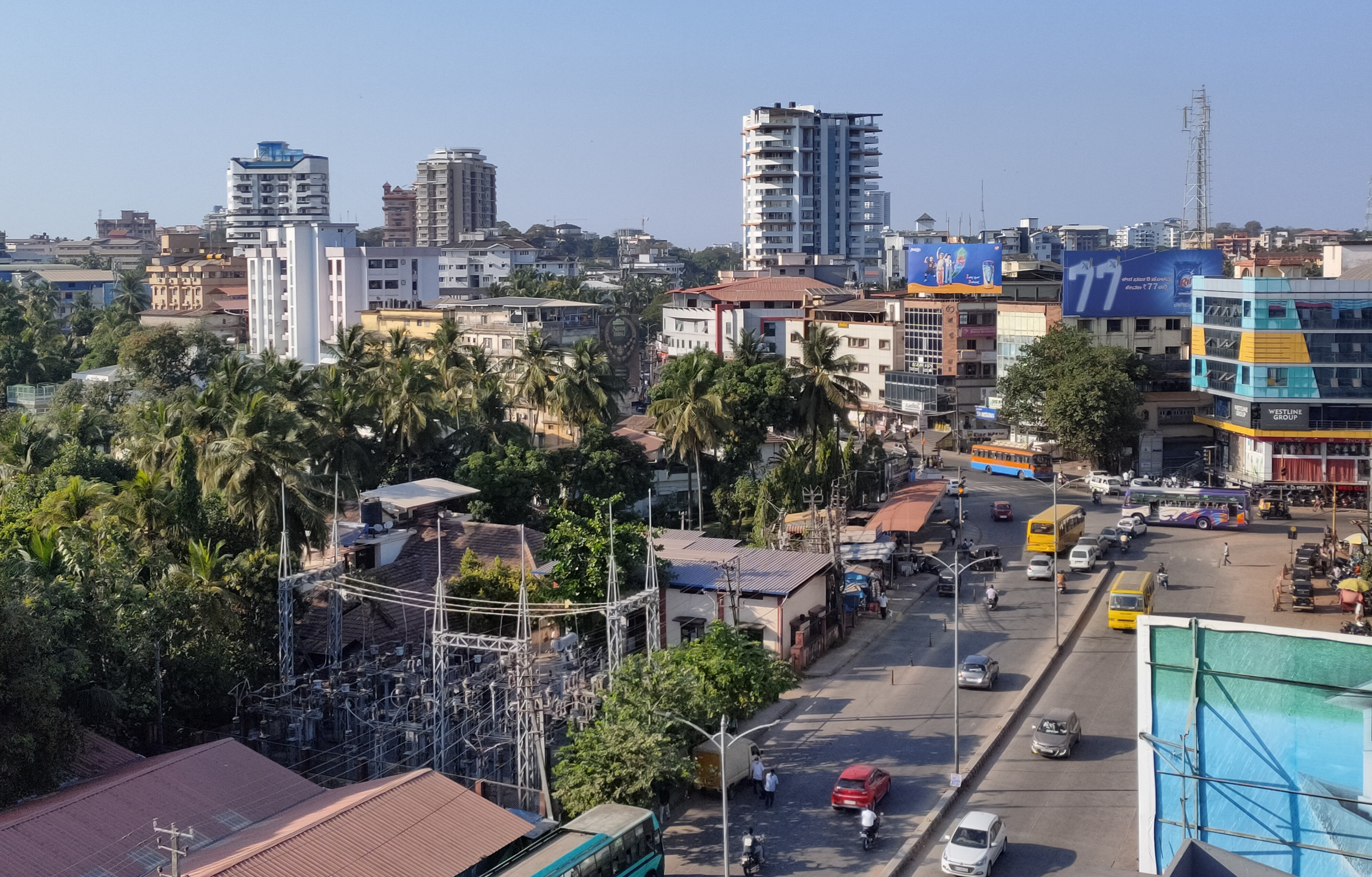
- Kankanady skylines at Mangalore CBD region, Kankanady, Mangalore

- Location in Mangalore city, Karnataka, India
- Coordinates: 12.850330261134292°N 74.85818090380112°E
- Country: India
- State: Karnataka
- District: Dakshina Kannada
- City: Mangalore

Government
  - Body: Mangalore City Corporation

Languages
  - Official: Kannada, English
- Time zone: UTC+5:30 (IST)

Kankanadi or Kankanady is one of the major upscale commercial and residential localities of the city of Mangalore in Karnataka, India.

== Educational institutions ==
The Father Muller's hospital campus houses the following educational institutions.

- Father Muller Medical College
- Father Muller's Institute of Homoeopothic Medical College
- Father Muller College of Nursing.
- Colaco School of Nursing

== Religious places ==
- Shree Brahma Baidarkala Garadi Kshetra is a religious place at Garodi in Kankanadi and is of much significance to the Billava community. This temple is dedicated to the twin cultural heroes Koti-Chennaya who lived in the 17th century and belongs to the Billawa community.

== Gallery ==
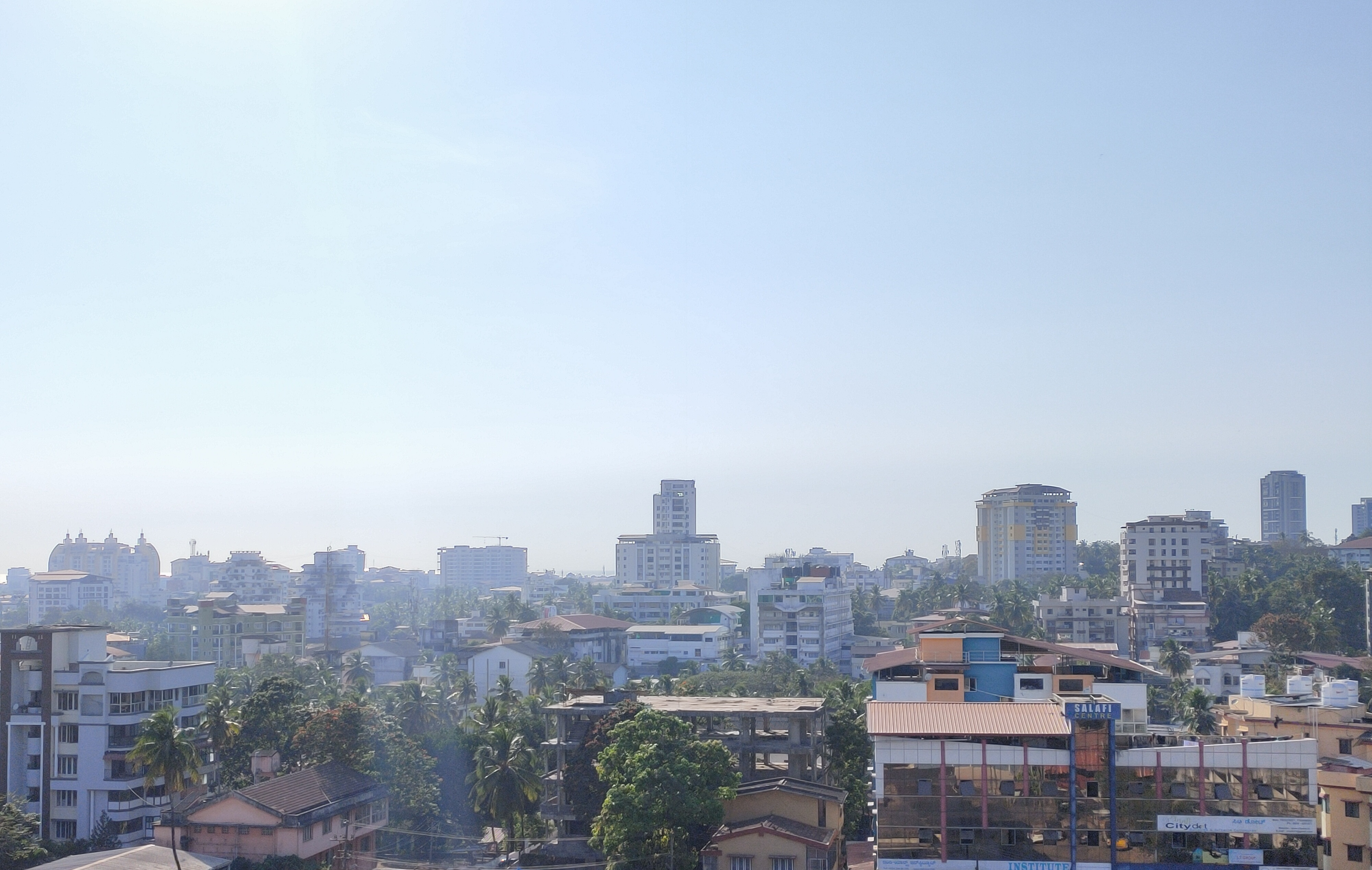
Falnir skylines viewed from Kankanady

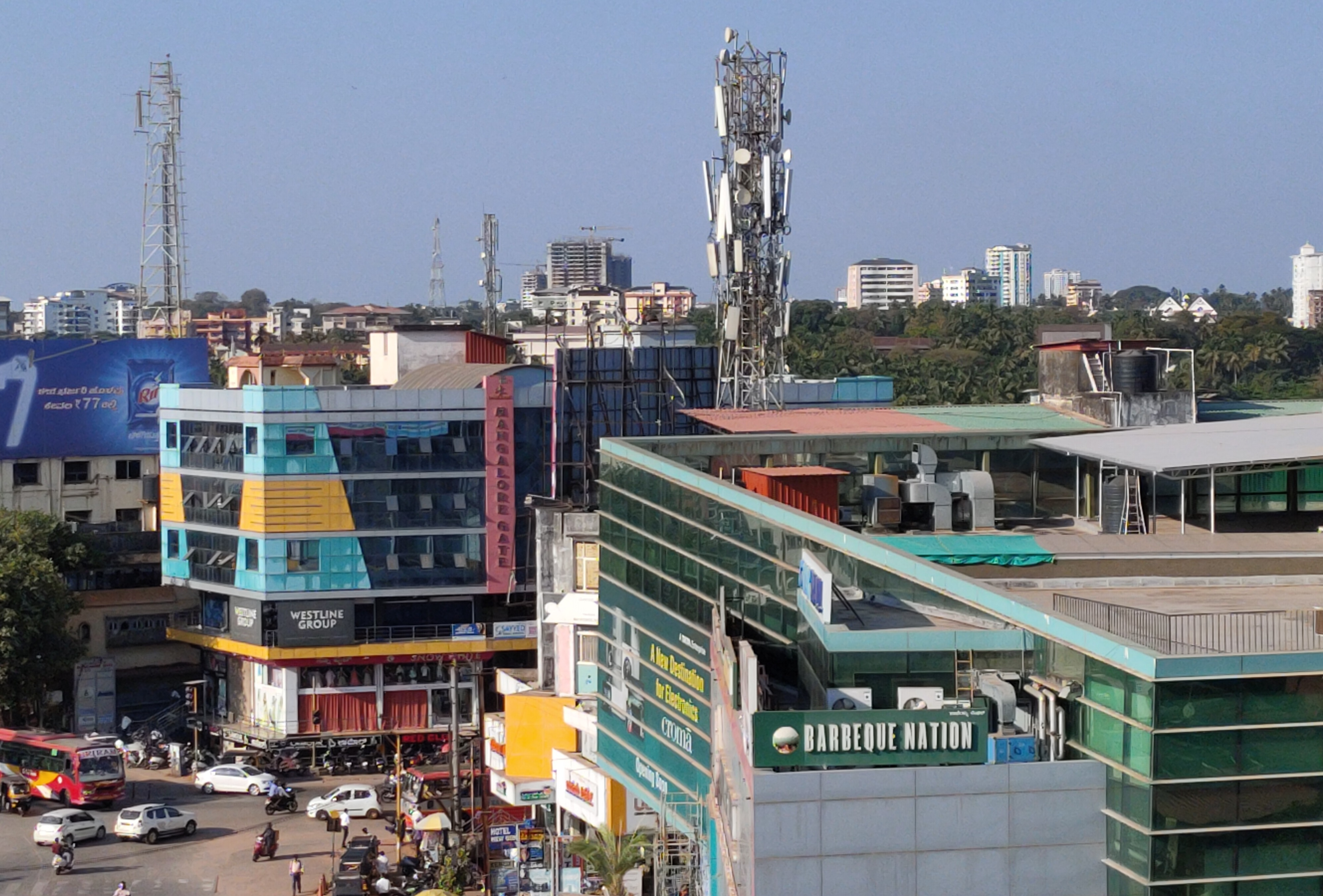
A part of Kadri skylines from far viewed from Kankanady

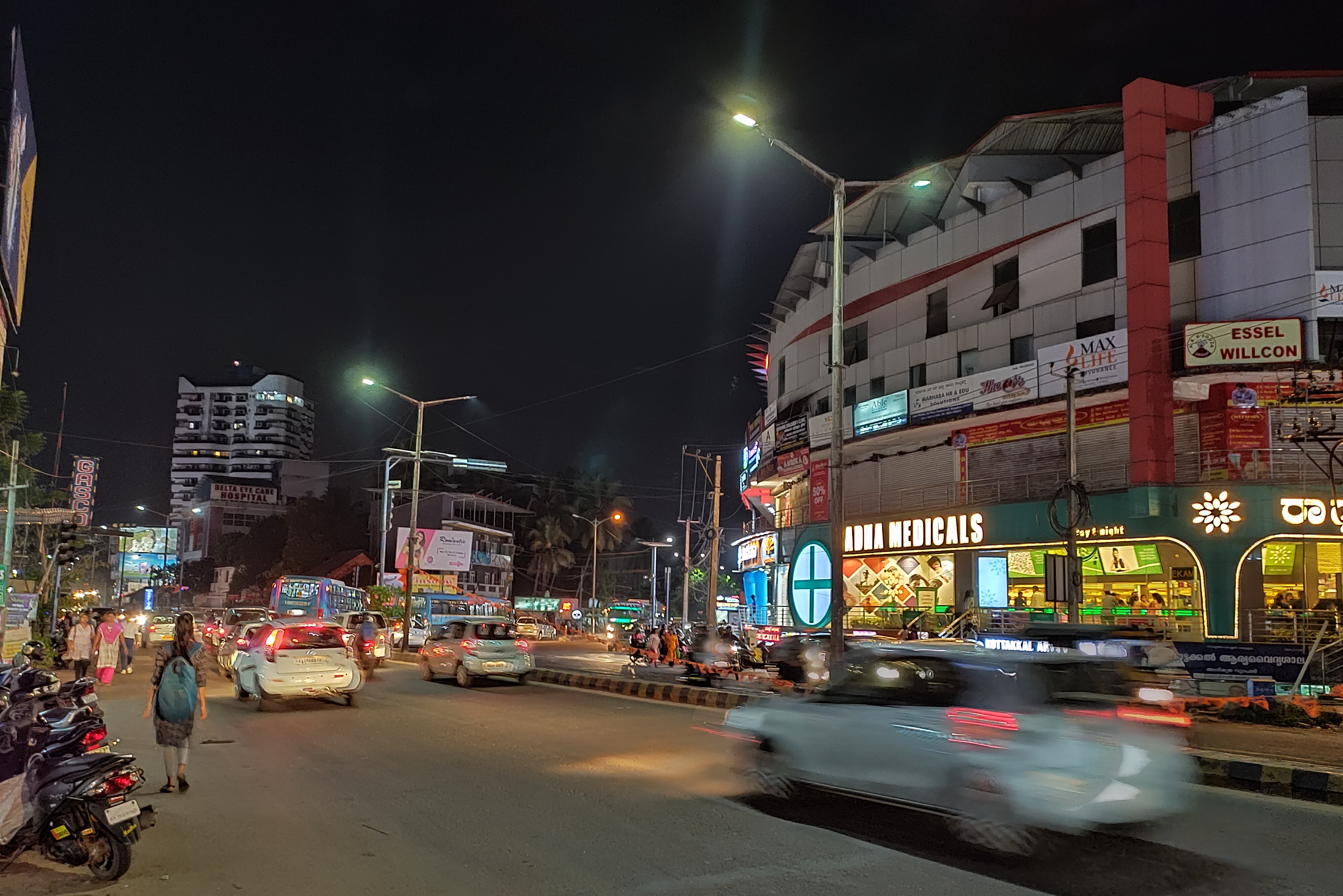
Balmatta Road at night, Kankanady

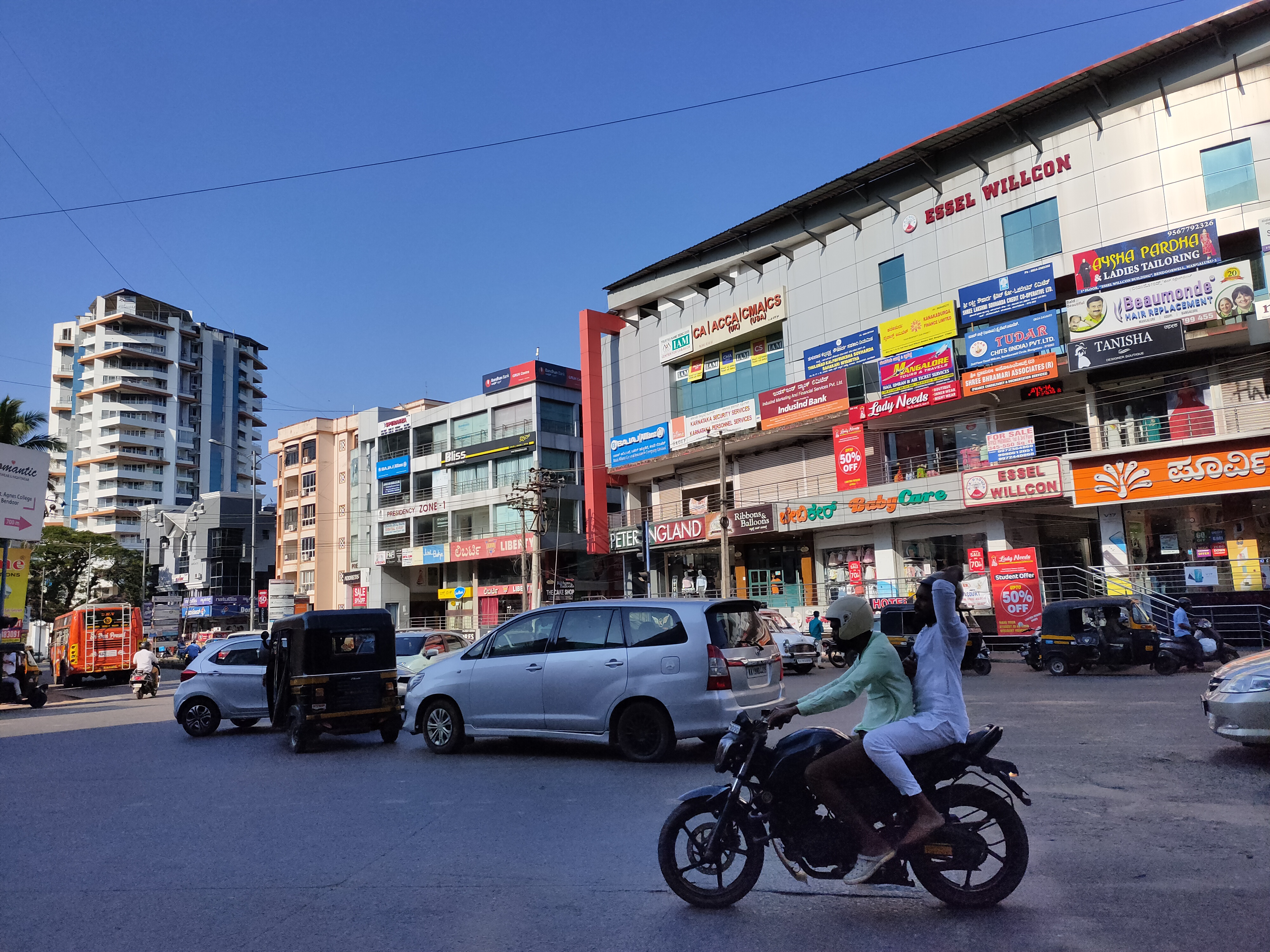
Bendorewell Jn, Kankanady

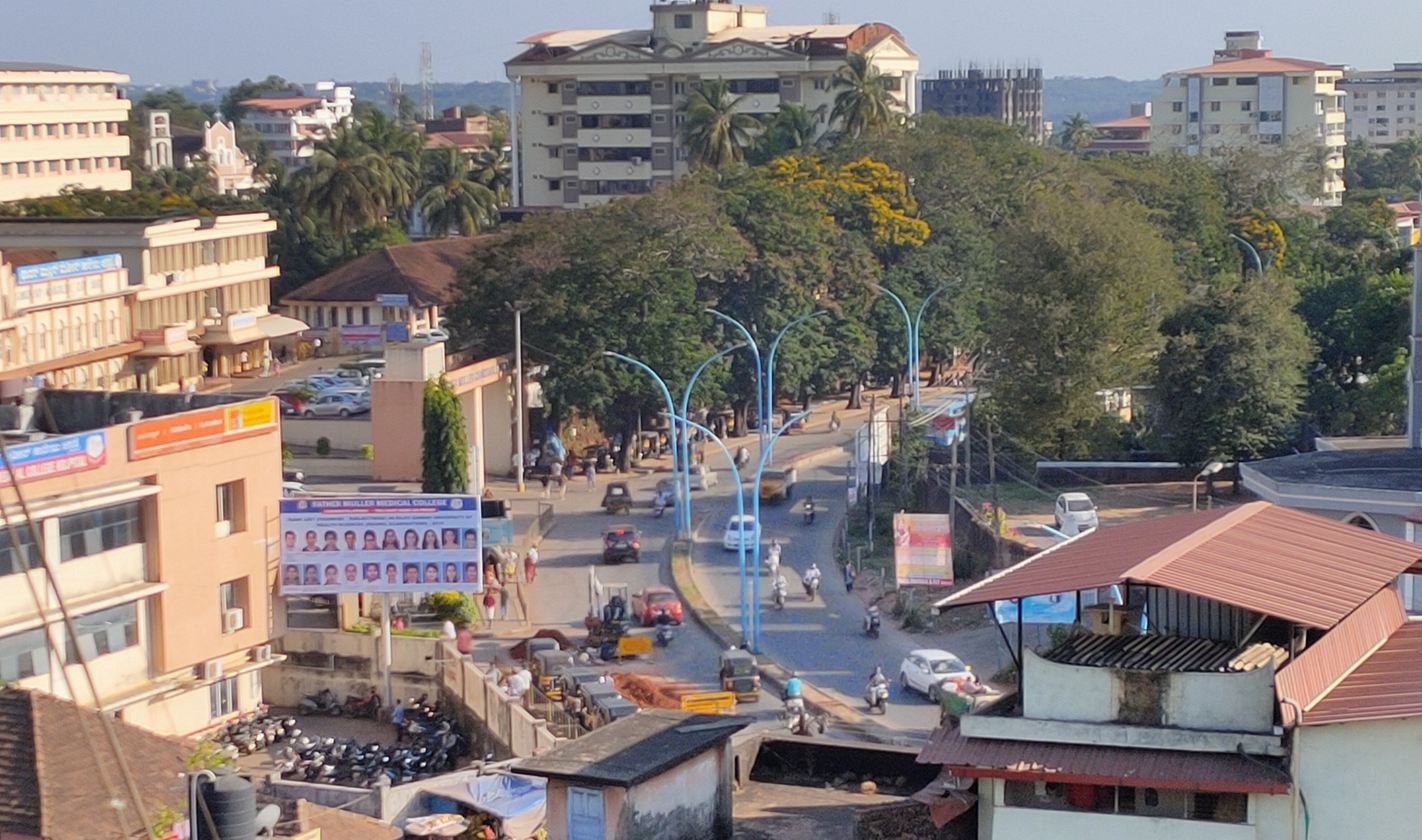
Mangaladevi Road, Kankanady

== See also ==
- Kadri
- Attavar
- Bejai
- Falnir
- Balmatta
- Sasihithlu Beach
- NITK Beach
- Panambur Beach
- Tannirbhavi Beach
- Ullal beach
- Someshwar Beach
- Pilikula Nisargadhama
- Kadri Park
- Tagore Park
- St. Aloysius Chapel
- Bejai Museum
- Aloyseum
