= Parameshwara =

Parameshwara may refer to:

- Parameshwara (god), a Sanskrit term for Supreme God
- Y. G. Parameshwara, first Indian and only the second person in the world to become a doctor and practice medicine despite being blind
- Parameshvara Nambudiri, Indian mathematician
- Parameswara (sultan), Malaccan sultan
- G. Parameshwara, Indian Politician

== See also ==
- Parameswara (disambiguation)
