= Koti Chennaya =

- Directed by: Anand P Raju
- Screenplay by: Anand P Raju; Dr Vaman Nandavar; Sudhakar Bannanje
- Story by: R Dhanaraj
- Based on: Koti and Chennayya
- Produced by: R Dhanaraj
- Starring: Balakrishna Shetty; Shekar Kotian; Vinaya Prasad; Neethu
- Music by: V. Manohar
- Production company: Prarthana Creations
- Release date: 2007 (India)
- Country: India
- Language: Tulu

Koti Chennaya is a 2007 historical Tulu language film based on the lives of Koti and Chennayya, the twin cultural folk heroes of Tulu Nadu. The film, which combines history, folklore and social stratum of yesteryear Tulu Nadu, is directed by Anand P Raju, with R Dhanaraj serving as producer under the banner of Prarthana Creations. The film stars Balakrishna Shetty, Shekar Kotian, Vinaya Prasad and Neethu.

The film has won the Indian National Award for Best Feature Film in Tulu at the 54th National Film Awards, and Neethu won the Karnataka State Film Award for Best Supporting Actress in 2007.

== Cast ==
- Balakrishna Shetty as Koti
- Shekar Kotian as Chennaiah
- Vinaya Prasad as Kinnidaru
- Neethu as Deyi Baidithi
- Naveen D. Padil
- K P Jagadish Adhikari
- Prakash Padubidri
- Chethan Rai
