= List of tallest buildings in Mangaluru =

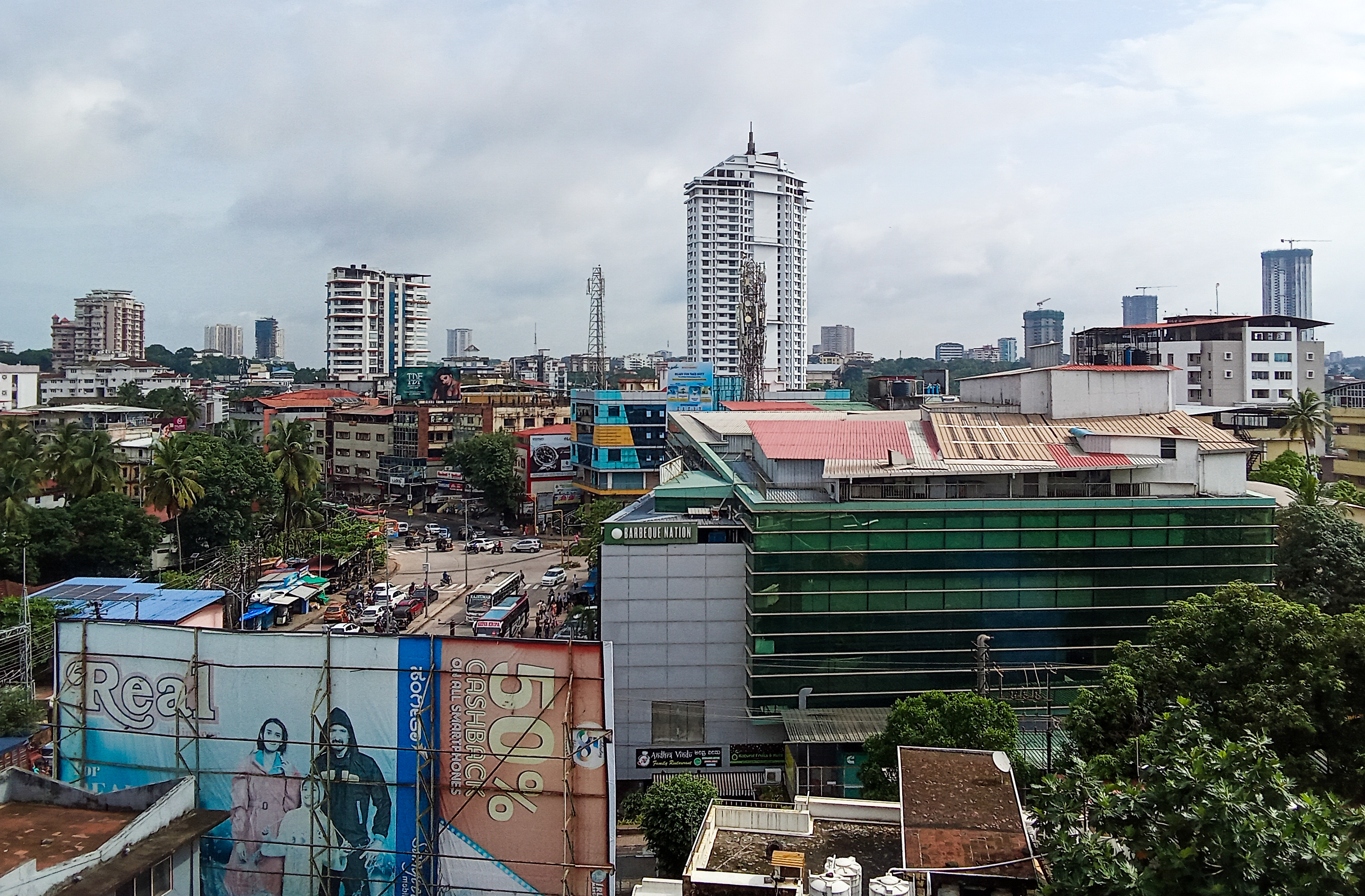
Growing skylines of the Mangalore CBD region

Mangalore is the chief port city and a commercial-industrial-educational hub of the Indian state of Karnataka.

Mangalore city is getting many skyscrapers, including some of the tallest in Southern India. It is developing like Mumbai and Dubai of Southern India, in terms of skyscrapers and high-rises. It is located about 350 kilometres (220 mi) west of the state capital, Bengaluru. Mangalore, formerly a quiet coastal town, is now evolving into a vibrant and significant city in South India. It is becoming an economic powerhouse in South India due to increasing commercial, industrial activities and development. With Mangalore's booming IT and startup ecosystems, the Karnataka government has designated it as the "Silicon Beach of India".

Mangalore lies between the Arabian Sea and the Western Ghat mountain ranges, and is the administrative headquarters of the Dakshina Kannada (formerly South Canara) district in south western Karnataka. With its pristine beaches, broad roads and calm localities this coastal city was declared the eighth cleanest city in India in 2010. Mangalore is one of the biggest commercial-industrial hubs in Southern India. It is the richest city in Karnataka after Bengaluru. Mangalore ranked India's 13th place in top business destination and Karnataka's second after Bengaluru.

== Tallest buildings ==
This lists ranks buildings in Mangalore that stand at least 70 m (230 ft) or 20 floors tall (including basements and ground floors), based on standard height measurement. This includes spires and architectural details, and also the height of the building below the ground, but does not include antenna masts. Only completed buildings and under-construction buildings that have been topped out are included.

Please note the following indications:
G - Ground floor
B - Basement floors
LB - Lower basement
UB - Upper basement
P - Podium floors
S - Stilt floors
SF - Service floors
VP - Vehicle Parking floors
UF - Upper floors
T - Terrace floors/top floors (structurally enclosed, but uninhabited)

Rank	Name	Floors	Floor details	Height	Location	Status	Year	Notes	Image
1	Westline Signature	55	3B+G+50UF+T	172.9 metres (567 ft)	Nanthoor	Topped Out	2026	Currently the tallest structure in Karnataka.	
2	Land Trades Shivabagh	39	3B+G+SF+32UF+2T	145 metres (476 ft)	Kadri	Topped Out	2026		
3	Land Trades Altura	37	B+G+33UF+2T	140 metres (459 ft)	Bendoorwell	Completed	2026	Currently the tallest completed building in Mangalore.	
4	Planet SKS	40	3B+G+36UF	135 metres (443 ft)	Kadri	Completed	2016	Was the tallest building in Karnataka when it was inaugurated. It has a unique three-winged design. It's known for ushering an era of skyscrapers in Mangalore.	
5	NorthernSky Excelsa	40	B+LG+UG+35UF+2T	130 metres (427 ft)	Nanthoor	Topped Out	2025		
6	Citadel Callista Sky Villa	36	2B+G+27UF+5T	125 metres (410 ft)	Kadri	Topped Out	2025		
7	Land Trades Solitaire	37	LB+UB+35UF	120 metres (394 ft)	Hat Hill	Completed	2019	Its design is slightly similar to Burj Khalifa, owing to the progressive architectural set-backs increasing with height, giving it a very attractive look. It is probably the most aesthetic skyscraper in Mangalore. It has 34 standard storeys and there are 3 additional storeys below the helipad.	
8	Prestige Valley Crest Tower 2	33	B+G+30UF+T	112 metres (367 ft)	Bejai	Completed	2023	Tallest twin towers in Mangalore	
9	Prestige Valley Crest Tower 1	32	B+G+29UF+T	109 metres (358 ft)	Bejai	Completed	2023	Tallest twin towers in Mangalore	
10	Marian Park - Residential Tower	33	7B+25UF+T	108 metres (354 ft)	Kadri	Completed	2023	From some angles where the basements aren't visible, the building appears much shorter than its actual height	
11	Rohan City	32	G+29UF+2T	104 metres (341 ft)	Bejai	Topped Out	2026	Mangalore's first residential building with an integrated mall.	
12	Northern Sky City Tower A	32	3P+G+28UF	100 metres (328 ft)	Pumpwell	Completed	2018	Part of a triple tower project, in the upcoming skyscraper hub of Pumpwell. It has three floors of podium.	
13	Northern Sky City Tower B	32	3P+G+28UF	100 metres (328 ft)	Pumpwell	Completed	2019	Part of a triple tower project, in the upcoming skyscraper hub of Pumpwell. It has three floors of podium.	
14	Northern Sky City Tower C	32	3P+G+28UF	100 metres (328 ft)	Pumpwell	Completed	2023	Part of a triple tower project, in the upcoming skyscraper hub of Pumpwell. It has three floors of podium.	
15	Raheja Pacific	28	G+25UF+2T	90 metres (295 ft)	Kulai	Completed	2017	This is the tallest building in North Mangalore.	
16	Bhandary Heights	28	2B+G+24UF+T	90 metres (295 ft)	Kottara Chowki	Completed	2018		
17	NorthernSky Alexandria Block B	27	3S+B+G+22UF	90 metres (295 ft)	Light House Hill	Completed	2017	This building is on Light House Hill, which is considered as the best vantage point for its view of Mangalore city.	
18	NorthernSky Alexandria Block C	27	3S+B+G+22UF	90 metres (295 ft)	Light House Hill	Completed	2017	This building is on Light House Hill, which is considered as the best vantage point for its view of Mangalore city.	
19	Brigade Pinnacle Block A	27	2B+G+22UF+2T	90 metres (295 ft)	Derebail	Completed	2017	This is the tallest building in the fast-growing residential area of Derebail. It has the most number of flats (414) in a single building in Mangalore.	
20	Brigade Pinnacle Block B	27	2B+G+22UF+2T	90 metres (295 ft)	Derebail	Completed	2017	This is the tallest building in the fast-growing residential area of Derebail. It has the most number of flats (414) in a single building in Mangalore.	
21	Brigade Pinnacle Block C	27	2B+G+22UF+2T	90 metres (295 ft)	Derebail	Completed	2017	This is the tallest building in the fast-growing residential area of Derebail. It has the most number of flats (414) in a single building in Mangalore.	
22	Inland Windsors	26	B+G+24UF	90 metres (295 ft)	Mary Hill	Completed	2012	This was the tallest building in Mangalore for some time. It was the first building in Mangalore to have a rooftop helipad.	
23	Maurishka Palace Tower A	26	2B+G+22UF+T	90 metres (295 ft)	Kadri	Completed	2015		
24	Maurishka Palace Tower B	26	2B+G+22UF+T	90 metres (295 ft)	Kadri	Completed	2015		
25	Abhiman Hills	25		85 metres (279 ft)	Light House Hill	Completed	2016	This building is on Light House Hill, which is considered as the best vantage point for its view of Mangalore city.	
26	Namko Ocean View	25	3B+2G+18UF+2T	85 metres (279 ft)	Hampankatta	Completed	2024		
27	Rohan Square Tower A	25	B+G+20UF+3T	85 metres (279 ft)	Nagori	Completed	2024	3 separate towers linked by a common base. These are the tallest buildings in East Mangalore	
28	Rohan Square Tower B	25	B+G+20UF+3T	85 metres (279 ft)	Nagori	Completed	2024	3 separate towers linked by a common base. These are the tallest buildings in East Mangalore	
29	Rohan Square Tower C	25	B+G+20UF+3T	85 metres (279 ft)	Nagori	Completed	2024	3 separate towers linked by a common base. These are the tallest buildings in East Mangalore	
30	NorthernSky Alexandria Block A	23	3S+B+G+18UF	77 metres (253 ft)	Light House Hill	Completed	2017	This building is on Light House Hill, which is considered as the best vantage point for its view of Mangalore city.	
31	NorthernSky Alexandria Block D	23	3S+B+G+18UF	77 metres (253 ft)	Light House Hill	Completed	2017	This building is on Light House Hill, which is considered as the best vantage point for its view of Mangalore city.	
32	Abhiman Texas	23		75 metres (246 ft)	Bendoorwell	Completed	2016		
33	K2	23		75 metres (246 ft)	Falnir	Completed	2009	This was the tallest building in Mangalore for some time.	
34	Godrej Alpine	23	B+2P+S+19UF	75 metres (246 ft)	Yeyyadi	Completed	2018		
35	Falnir Terraces	23	2B+G+18UF+2T	75 metres (246 ft)	Falnir	Completed	2020		
36	Mohtisham Canopy	23	2B+G+18UF+2T	75 metres (246 ft)	Urwa Stores	Completed	2021	A very aesthetic building with quad symmetry	
37	Bearys Turning Point	20	G+17UF+2T	70 metres (230 ft)	Deralakatte	Completed	2021	This building houses India's first Mall in Panchayat jurisdiction	
38	Raheja Atlantic	22	G+19UF+2T	70 metres (230 ft)	Kulai	Completed	2016		
39	Mohtisham Siliconia	22	B+G+19UF+T	70 metres (230 ft)	Kuttar	Completed	2015	Tallest building in South Mangalore	
40	Mohtisham Amity	22	2G+19UF+T	70 metres (230 ft)	Attavar	Completed	2024	Tallest building in East Mangalore	
41	Land Trades Atlantis	21	G+20UF	70 metres (230 ft)	Bendoorwell	Completed	2015		
42	Mohtisham Gallery	20	G+19UF	70 metres (230 ft)	Padil	Completed	2015	Tallest building in East Mangalore	
43	Mohtisham Fernhill	20	2B+2G+14UF+2T	65 metres (213 ft)	Kadri	Completed	2020		
44	Sindhu Kaveri	20	B+LG+UG+15UF+2T	60 metres (197 ft)	Urwa	Topped Out	2026		

== Tallest under construction ==
Rank	Name	Floors	Floor details	Height	Location	Status	Year	Notes	Image
1	Bhandary Vertica	58	B+G+54UF+2T	210 metres (690 ft)	Kadri	Under construction	2027	Will be the tallest villament tower in Southern India. With a height to width ratio of 15:1, it will be the skinniest skyscraper in India.	
2	Yamuna Sky City	64	G+61UF+2T	207.26 metres (680 ft)	Kulai	Under construction	2028	Will be the building with the most number of floors in Mangalore. With a width of 99.31m, it will be the second widest skyscraper in India. It will have Asia’s longest curved balcony stretching over 300 feet.	
3	Rohan Marina One - The Resort	48	G+46UF+T	168 metres (551 ft)	Surathkal	Under construction	2030	Will be the tallest true beachfront skyscraper in India.	
4	Lotus Adelaide	44	2B+G+40UF+T	166 metres (545 ft)	Chilimbi	Under construction	2028		
5	Rohan Marina One - The Retreat	40	G+38UF+T	155 metres (509 ft)	Surathkal	Under construction	2030	The grand structural details at the top add to the height significantly.	
6	Land Trades Pristine	41	B+G+38UF+T	153 metres (502 ft)	Chilimbi	Under construction	2027		
7	Mohtisham Manhattan	44	G+42UF+T	150 metres (492 ft)?	Hampankatta	Under construction	2029		
8	Old Fields by NorthernSky - Block A	43	2B+G+39UF+T	150 metres (492 ft)?	Kodialbail	Under construction	2028		
9	Old Fields by NorthernSky -Block B	43	2B+G+39UF+T	150 metres (492 ft)?	Kodialbail	Under construction	2028		
10	Citadel Antares	40	2B+LG+UG+35UF+T	140 metres (459 ft)	Gandhinagar	Under construction	2029		
11	Land Trades Altitude	35	2B+G+30UF+2T	133 metres (436 ft)	Bendoorwell	Under construction	2028		
12	Agraja Atlantic	36	B+LG+UG+32UF+T	126 metres (413 ft)	Chilimbi	Under construction	2031		
13	Land Trades Mahalaxmi	37	LG+UG+33UF+2T	123 metres (404 ft)	Alake	Under construction	2028		
14	Rohan Sea View	34	G+32UF+T	121 metres (397 ft)	Mannagudda	Under construction	2032		
15	Nidhi Land Sky Garden	34	2B+2G+29UF+T	114.1 metres (374 ft)?	Chilimbi	Under construction	2029		
16	Vajra Infinity	32	B+LG+UG+29UF	110 metres (361 ft)?	Bejai	Under construction	2030		
17	Yamuna Kamaldeep Twin Tower - 1	35	4B+G+30UF	110 metres (361 ft)?	Pumpwell	Under construction	2029		
18	Yamuna Kamaldeep Twin Tower - 2	35	4B+G+30UF	110 metres (361 ft)?	Pumpwell	Under construction	2029		
19	Marian Park - Commercial Tower	30	5B+G+24UF	110 metres (361 ft)?	Kadri	Under construction	2027		
20	Abish Evara	33	LG+UG+27UF+4T	108 metres (354 ft)	Pandeshwar	Under construction	2030		
21	Land Trades BMK Sky Villa	30	2B+G+24UF+3T	108 metres (354 ft)	Falnir	Under construction	2027		
22	Poorvi Estella	31	B+G+28UF+T	96 metres (315 ft)	Bejai	Under construction	2027		
23	Rohan Heaven	27	G+25UF+T	90 metres (295 ft)?	Padil	Under construction	2029		
24	Mohtisham Lucent	25	2B+G+20UF+2T	76 metres (249 ft)	Kottara Chowki	Under construction	2027		
25	Sindhu Saraswathi	22	G+20UF+T	70 metres (230 ft)?	Mannagudda	Under construction	2029		
26	Land Trades Expertise Enclave	21	B+LG+UG+16UF+2T	65 metres (213 ft)	Attavar	Under construction	2029		

== Tallest proposed ==
Rank	Name	Floors	Floor Details	Height	Location	Status	Image
1	Legacy	69 (Subject to Airport clearance)	G+68		Bejai-Lalbagh	Planned	
2	Mangalore Eye	42		200 m	Kadri	Proposed	
3	Westline Novifour Cubix	52	6B+G+45UF		Kadri	Planned	
4	Land Trades (yet to be named)	45			Highland	Planned	
5	Mohtisham (yet to be named)	45			Bejai	Planned	
6	Milestone Infinia	45			Pandeshwar	Planned	
7	Khazana Luxuria Tower 1	43			Attavar	Planned	
8	Khazana Luxuria Tower 2	43			Attavar	Planned	
9	Bawa Heights	43			Pumpwell	Planned	
10	Eugene Builders (yet to be named)	41	G+40		Morgan's Gate	Planned	
11	Rohan Celebration	40 * 4			Attavar	Planned	
12	Rohan Heights	38	G+36UF+T		Yeyyadi	Planned	
13	NP Developers (yet to be named)	35	2B+G+32		Ashoknagar	Planned	
14	Bhandary builders (yet to be named)	34			Bikarnakatte	Planned	
15	Nalka Royal Raims	33			Pumpwell	Planned	
16	Landmark InfraTech (yet to be named)	32			Balmatta	Planned	
17	Rohan Tower	31	G+30UF		Padil	Planned	
18	Renuka The Tranquility Bay	30			Airport Road	Planned	
19	Marian Downtown - Residential	30			Yeyyadi	Planned	
20	Marian Downtown - Hotel	30			Yeyyadi	Planned	
21	Renuka Builders (yet to be named)	30			Yemmekere	Planned	
22	NorthernSky (yet to be named)	30			Karangalpady	Planned	
23	Lotus Properties (yet to be named)	30			Bejai	Planned	
24	Mohtisham Crescent	30	2B+G+25UF+2T		Kottara Chowki	Planned	
25	Global Developers (yet to be named)	27			Urwa	Planned	
26	NorthernSky (yet to be named)	25?			Kadri	Planned	
27	Mohtisham Timberland	25			Balmatta	Planned	
28	Arnava Builders (Yet to be named)	25			Sasihithlu	Planned	
29	UBC Sky Homes	25			Yekkur	Planned	
30	Rohan Retreat	20?			Souterpet	Planned	
31	Inland (yet to be named)	20			Kadri	Planned	
32	Land Trades (yet to be named)	TBD			Mallikatta	Planned	
33	Citadel (yet to be named)	TBD			Yeyyadi	Planned	
34	Rohan (yet to be named)	TBD			Derebail	Planned	

== Cancelled buildings ==
Rank	Name	Floors	Location	Image
1	Mohtisham Celebrations Integrated MEPL Township Towers (multiple)	Upto 50	Adyar-Neermarga-Kannur-Alape	
2	Malabar Township Towers (multiple)	Upto 45	Jeppinamogaru	
3	Raheja Township Towers (8)	23-45	Kulai	
4	Mangalore Internet City Towers	20-40	Shakthinagar	
5	Presidency Marvel	40	Pumpwell	
6	Westline Presidential Suites	36	Falnir	
7	Mak (unnamed)	33	Pumpwell	
8	Allegro (unnamed)	33	Pandeshwar	
9	Marian Crown	32	Pumpwell	
10	Prestige Verdant Vista	31	Kadri	
11	Brigade (unnamed)	28	Derebail	
12	Bearys Golden Harvest	27	Bejai	
13	Maurishka City Towers (2)	26	Kavoor	
14	NorthernSky (unnamed)	25	Kadri	
15	Bunts Centenary Tower	25	Bunts Hostel	
16	Marian Greens Towers (2)	20-23	Yeyyadi	
17	Rohan Avenue	20	Surathkal	

== Timeline of tallest buildings ==
Name	Location	Years as tallest	Floors	Image	Height
PVS Building	Kodialbail	1976 - 2000	11		33 metres (108 ft)
The Capitol	Kadri	2000 - 2006	11		47 metres (154 ft)
Mont Tiara	Nanthoor	2006 -2009	18		60 metres (197 ft)
K2	Falnir	2009 -2014	23		81 metres (266 ft)
Inland Windsors	Yeyyadi	2014 -2016	26		91 metres (299 ft)
Planet SKS	Kadri	2016 - 2026	40		135 metres (443 ft)
Land Trades Altura	Bendoorwell	2026 -	37		140 metres (459 ft)

== Overview ==
Mangalore has been making rapid progress in the real estate industry, especially when it comes to tall buildings. Contrary to the all-Indian trend of skyscrapers coming up only in highly populated Metropolitan cities and their neighbourhoods, this not-so-populous city in Karnataka has also began building skyscrapers. Mangalore has over 40 completed and topped out buildings taller than 20 floors. A few more are already under construction, and many more are in the pipeline. The skyline of the city has undergone many changes in the past decade, and is set to change drastically in the coming years.

Karnataka's top 3 tallest under construction skyscrapers - Yamuna Sky City, Bhandary Vertica and Westline Signature are in Mangalore. Most of the present high-rises in the city are concentrated around the central business district and also in the Kadri-Bejai region. The Kadri-Bejai belt is turning out to be the "Manhattan of Mangalore", with a lot of highrises being constructed and planned in the region. The 2020s skyline of Mangalore is extensively likened to that of Mumbai in the 1980s.

Another interesting fact about the highrises of Mangalore is that all buildings with 18 or more floors (or 60 or more meters in height) have a helipad, complying with the safety norms set by the local administration. However, the building K2 (with 20 floors) does not have a helipad, since it was constructed before this rule was formed. However, the requirement has changed recently, as service floors are being used as an alternative for helipads.

== Trivia ==
- Tallest completed building - Land Trades Altura - 140 meters
- Completed building with the most number of floors - Planet SKS - 40 floors - (3 basements + ground floor + 36 upper floors)
- Tallest building under construction - Bhandary Vertica - 210 meters
- U/C building with the most number of floors - Yamuna Sky City - 64 floors (ground floor + 61 upper floors + 2 terrace floors)
- Completed building with the most number of apartments - Brigade Pinnacle - 414 flats
- U/C building with the most number of apartments - Rohan City - 546 apartments
- Building with the largest residential space - Planet SKS - 801265 square feet (74439.91 sq m)
- Project with the most number of flats - Northern Sky City - 672 flats in 3 towers
- Tallest hotel - Deepa Grandeur - 25 floors (U/C)
- Tallest villament tower - Bhandary Vertica 58 floors (U/C)
- First building with helipad - Inland Windsors
- First true skyscraper (150m+ as per international definition) - Westline Signature
- First centrally air - conditioned skyscraper - Westline Signature (U/C)
- First centrally air - conditioned highrise - Landmark Grand City
- Building with the longest rooftop swimming pool - Westline Signature (U/C)
- First platinum rated green building (skyscraper) - Westline Signature (U/C)

== See also ==
- List of tallest buildings in India
- List of tallest buildings in Bengaluru
