= Balmatta =

- Commercial Locality
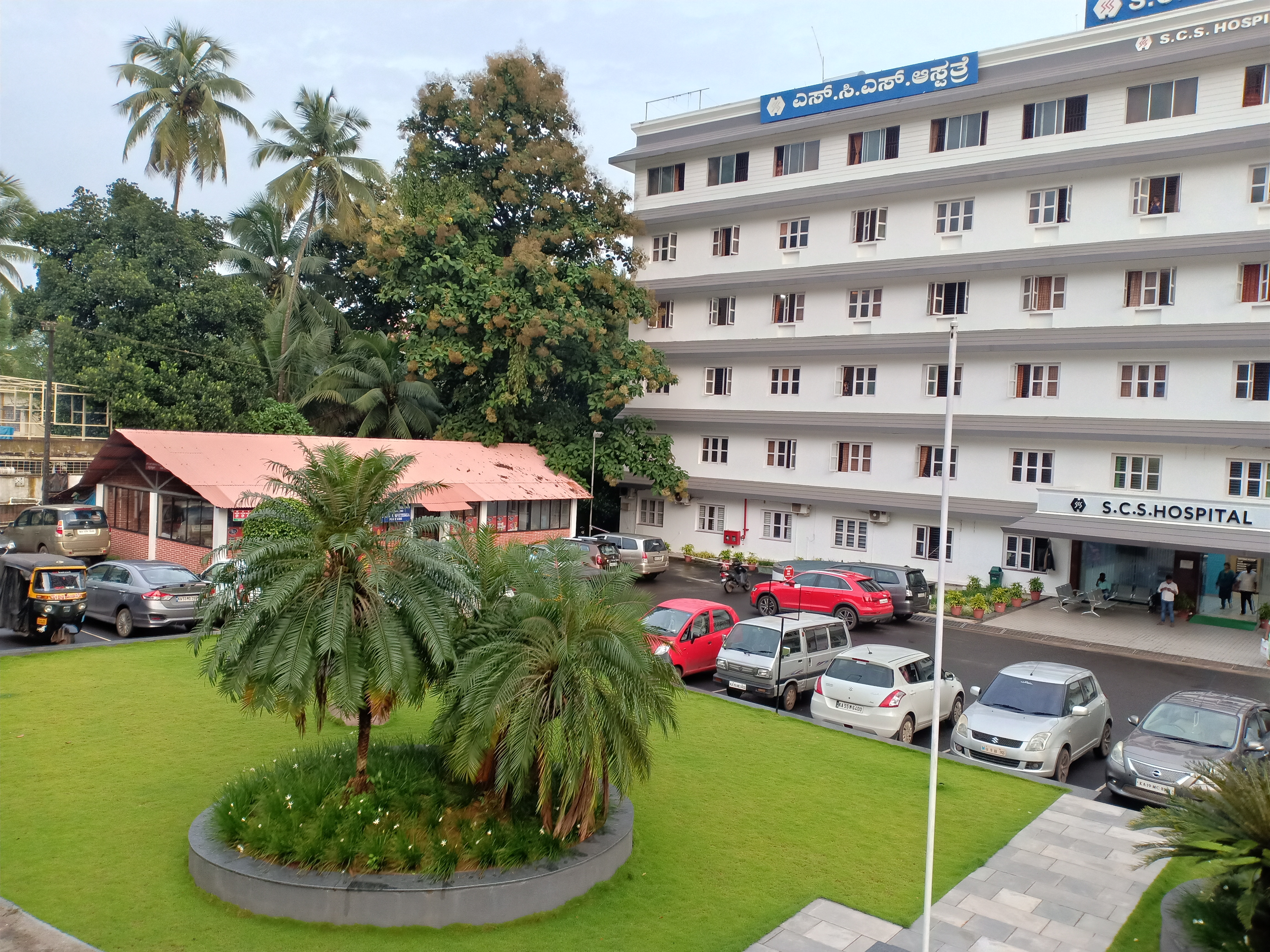
- Balmatta, Mangalore

- Location in Mangalore city, Karnataka, India
- Coordinates: 12.851330261134092°N 74.85718090380112°E
- Country: India
- State: Karnataka
- District: Dakshina Kannada
- City: Mangalore

Government
  - Body: Mangalore City Corporation

Languages
  - Official: Kannada, English
- Time zone: UTC+5:30 (IST)

Balmatta is one of the major commercial localities of Mangalore CBD region in Karnataka state of India. Balmatta Pre-University college, situated in this locality was built in 1912. It is one of the busiest localities and surrounded by Hampankatta, Kankanadi and Kadri, which are major localities of Mangalore.

== See also ==
- Hampankatta
- Kadri
- Kankanadi
- Bejai
- Attavar
- Falnir
- Sasihithlu Beach
- NITK Beach
- Panambur Beach
- Tannirbhavi Beach
- Ullal beach
- Someshwar Beach
- Pilikula Nisargadhama
- Kadri Park
- Tagore Park
- St. Aloysius Chapel
- Bejai Museum
- Aloyseum
- Kudla Kudru
