= Bejai =

- Commercial & Residential locality
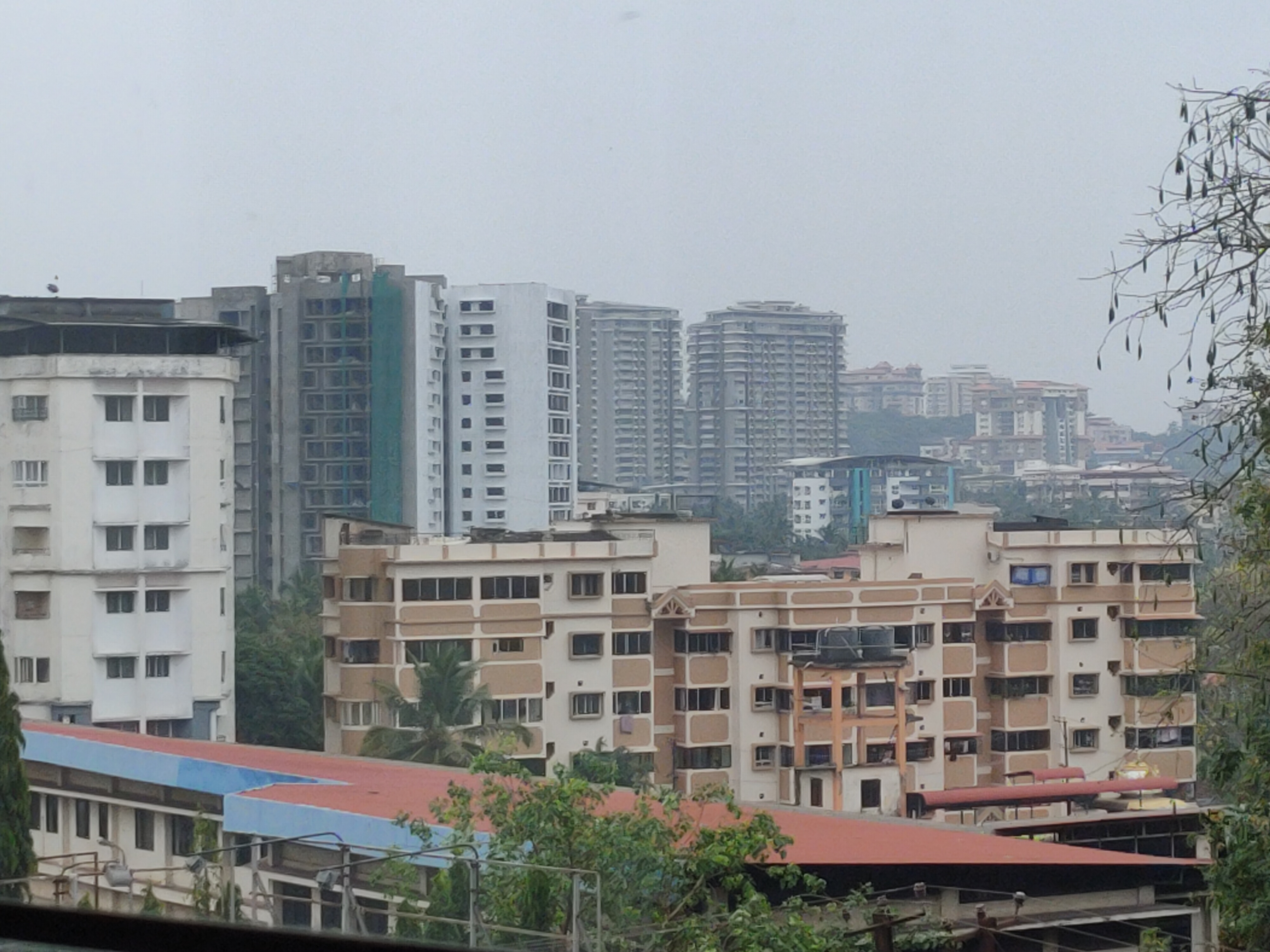
- View of highrise buildings at Bejai, Mangaluru
- Interactive map of Bejai
- Coordinates: 12.8919°N 74.8463°E
- Country: India
- State: Karnataka
- District: Dakshina Kannada
- City: Mangalore

Government
  - Body: Mangalore City Corporation

Languages
  - Official: Kannada, English
- Time zone: UTC+5:30 (IST)

Bejai is one of the major localities in Mangalore city, Karnataka, India. The series of Bharath malls, Bharath mall & Bharath mall 2 (under construction), are located here. It is one of the upscale & the busiest residential cum commercial localities of Mangalore. Bejai - Kadri belt is also regarded as the "Manhattan of Mangalore" with many high-rise buildings.

== Gallery ==
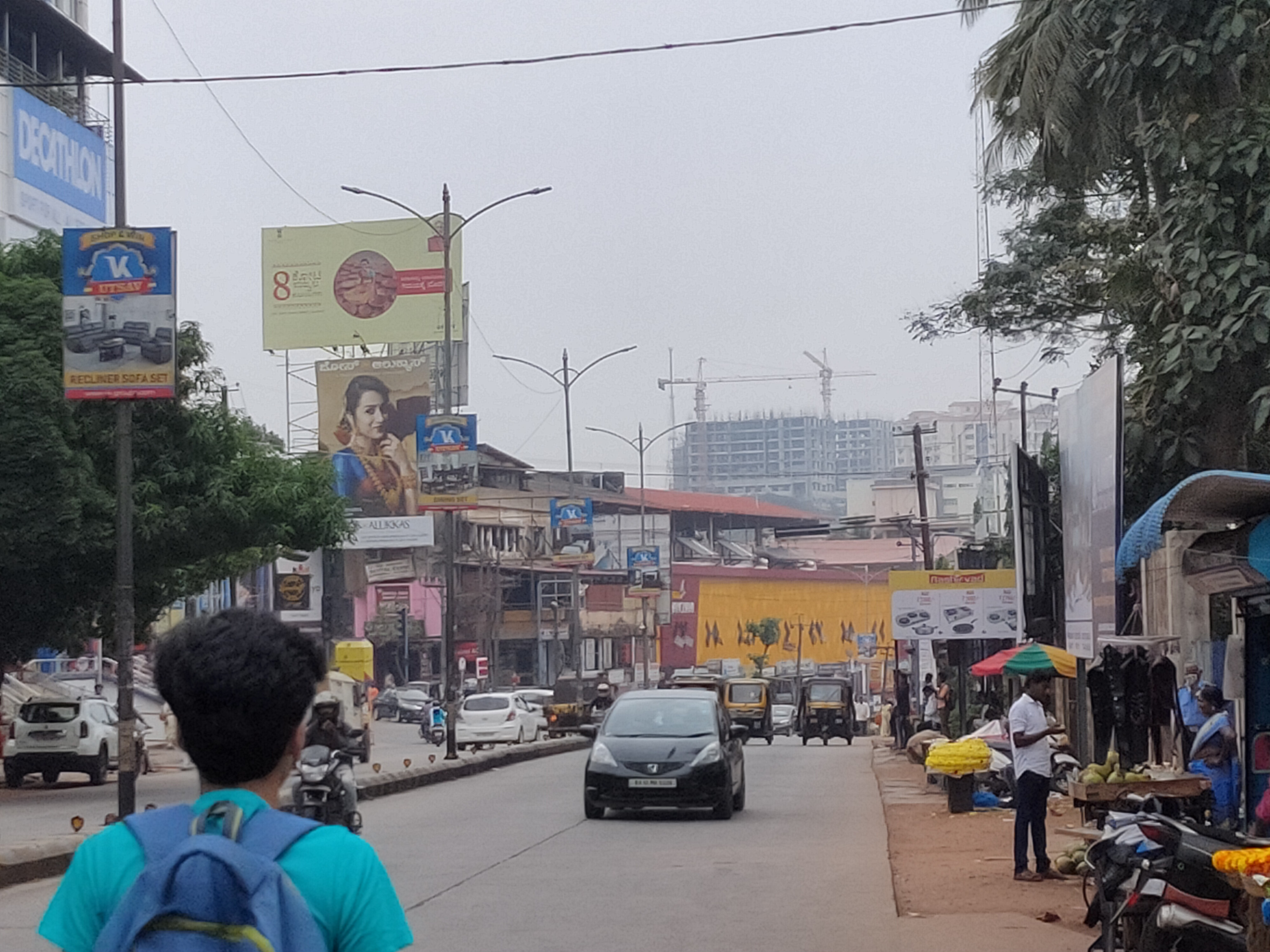
Bejai - KPT Jn road

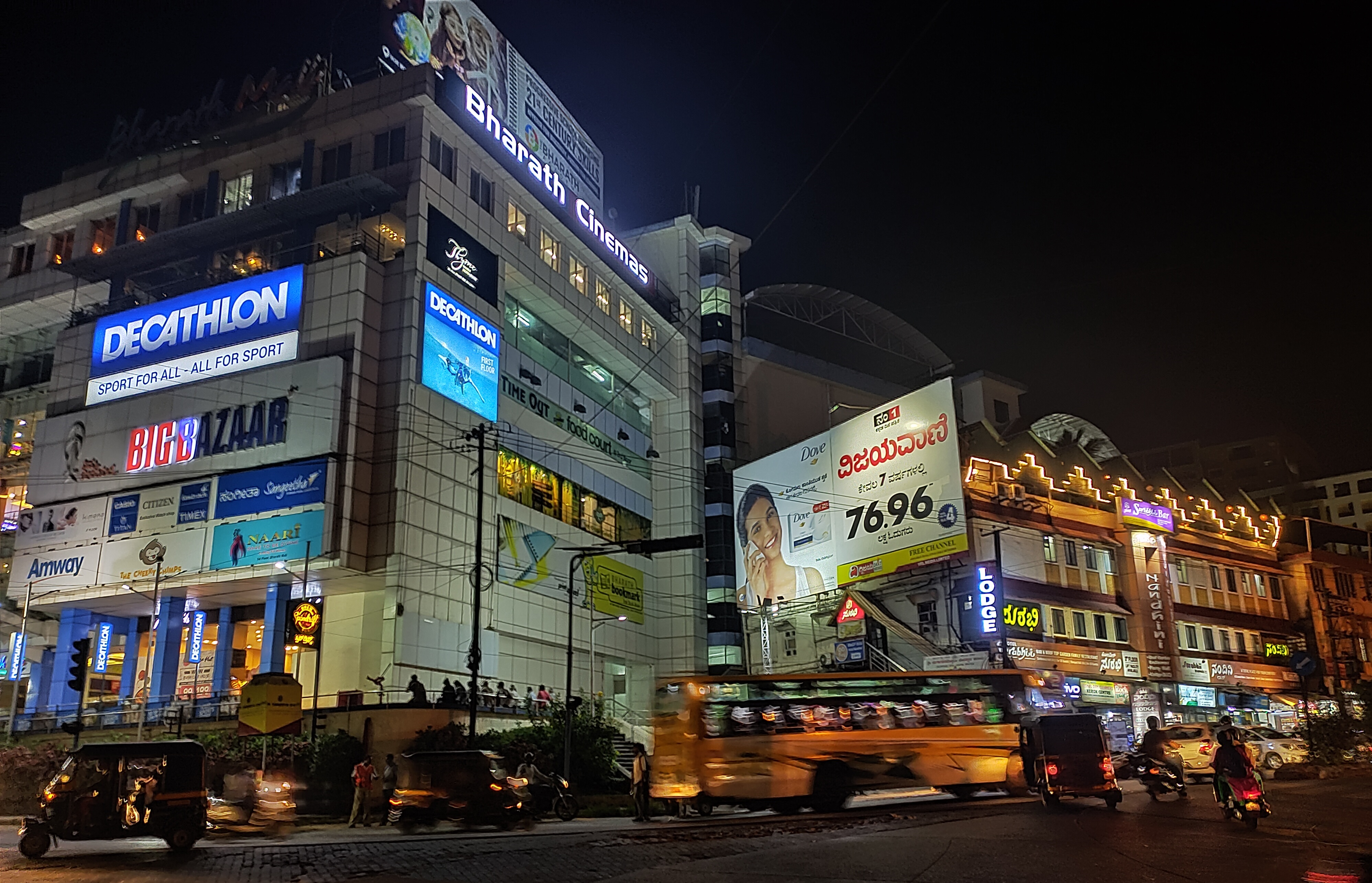
A busy Bejai junction at night

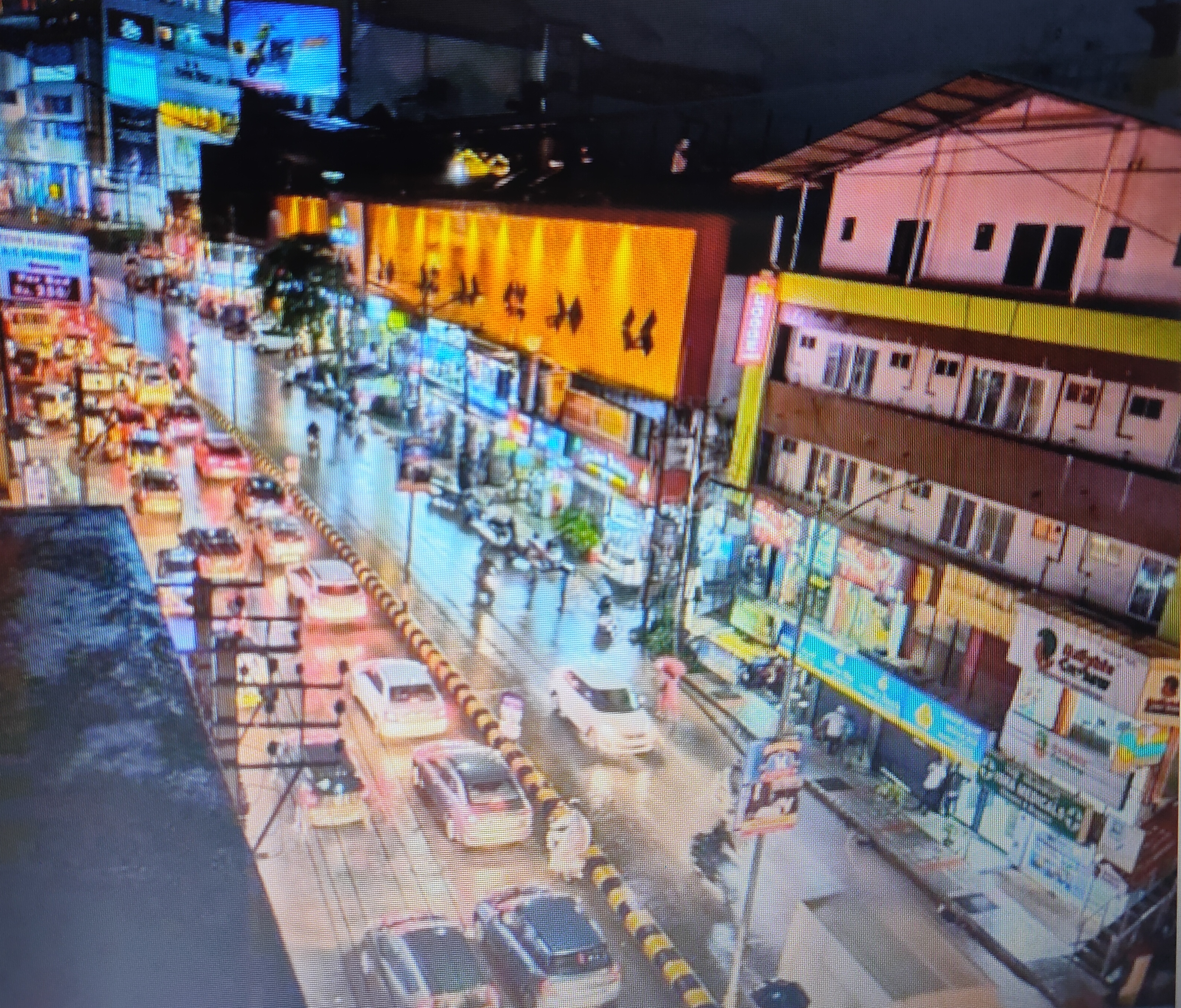
Bejai - KPT Jn Road at night

== See also ==
- Kadri
- Kankanadi
- Balmatta
- Attavar
- Falnir
- Sasihithlu Beach
- NITK Beach
- Panambur Beach
- Tannirbhavi Beach
- Ullal beach
- Someshwar Beach
- Pilikula Nisargadhama
- Kadri Park
- Tagore Park
- St. Aloysius Chapel
- Bejai Museum
- Aloyseum
- Kudla Kudru
