= Lighthouse Hill =

Lighthouse Hill may refer to:

- Lighthouse Hill, Staten Island
- Lighthouse Hill (film), a 2004 British film
- Light House Hill, Mangalore
