= Kadri =

Kadri may refer to:

== People ==
- Kadri (name), a personal name

== Places ==
- Kadri, Mangalore, a neighbourhood in Mangalore, India

== See also ==
- Quadri (disambiguation)
- Kadiri, a place of Hindu pilgrimage in Andhra Pradesh, India
- Balakadri, form of traditional music on the Caribbean island of Guadeloupe
- Qadiriyyah, subgroup of Islamic dervishes
