= Quadri (surname) =

Quadri is a surname. Notable people with the surname include:

- Alberto Quadri (born 1983), Italian footballer
- Argeo Quadri (1911 – 2004), Italian conductor
- Jacopo Quadri (born 1964), Italian film editor and documentarist
- Sayeed Quadri (born 1960), Indian lyricist and poet who works in Bollywood
- Sohail Quadri, Canadian politician

== See also ==
- Quadri (disambiguation)
- Qaderi
