= Nanthoor =

- Junction
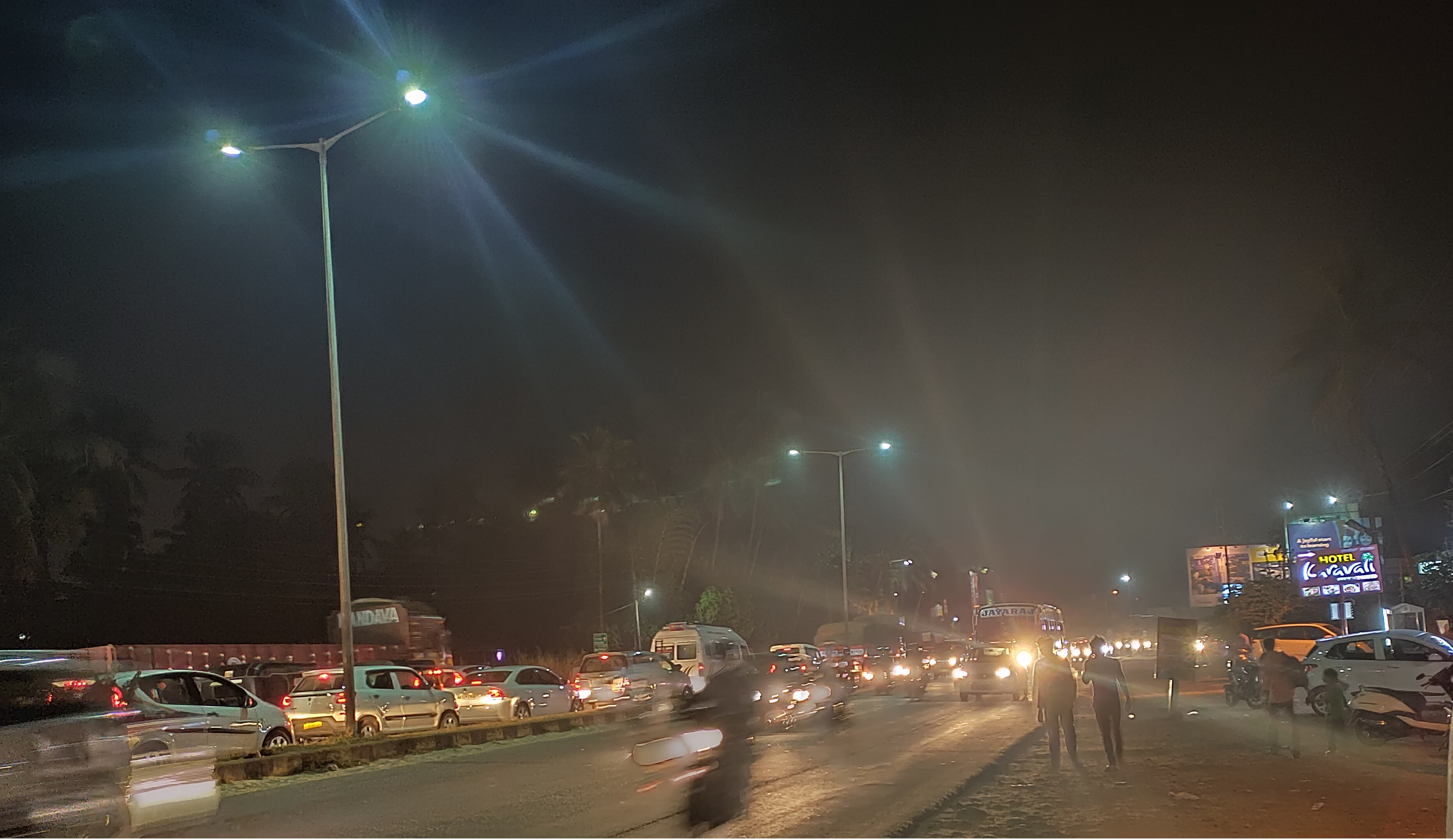
- Bustling Nanthoor Junction view at night
- Country: India
- State: Karnataka
- District: Dakshina Kannada
- City: Mangalore

Government
  - Body: Mangalore City Corporation

Nanthoor is a locality in the city of Mangalore, Karnataka, India. It is one of the busiest junctions in Mangalore. It is the junction of two national highways. Karnataka's longest national highway (NH 169) starts from Nanthoor Junction. It is close to Lotus Mall, one of biggest malls in India. Nanthoor is one of the commercial centres of Mangalore. Westline Signature, the tallest under-construction building of South India, with 53 floors, is located here. It is also known as Silk Board junction of Mangalore due to traffic congestion which occurs most of the time.

== Gallery ==
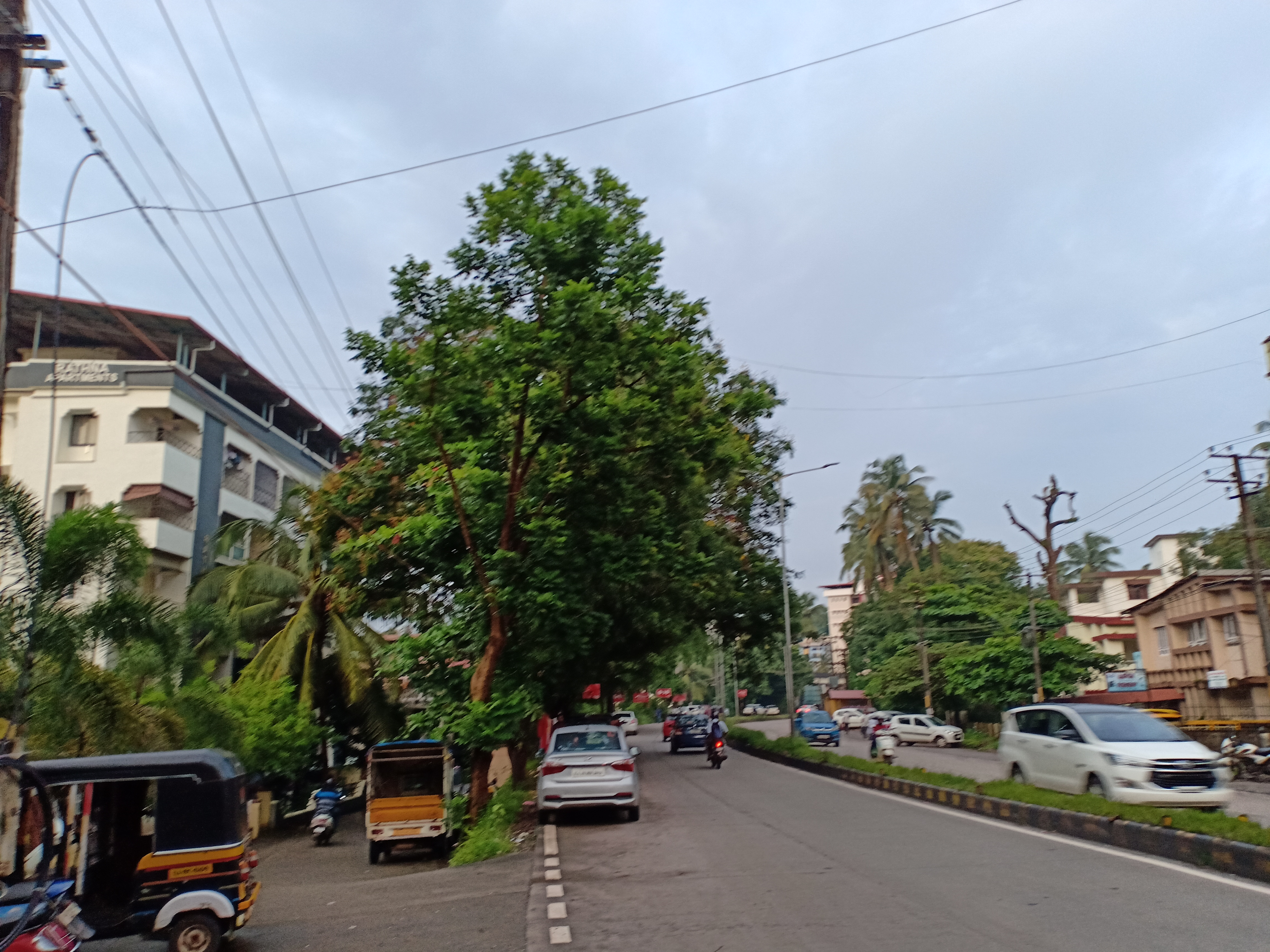
Agnes-Nanthoor Road

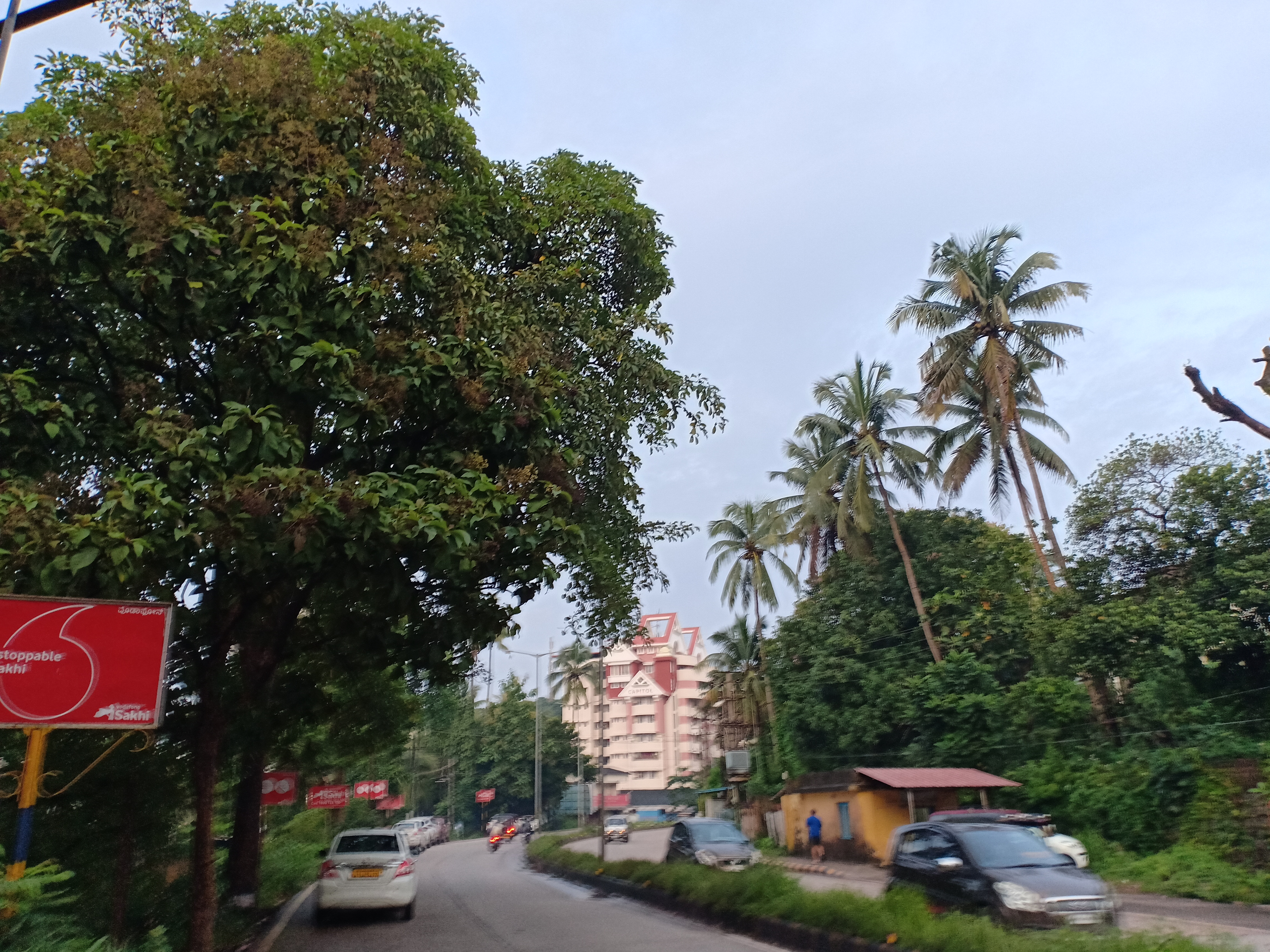
Agnes-Nanthoor Road

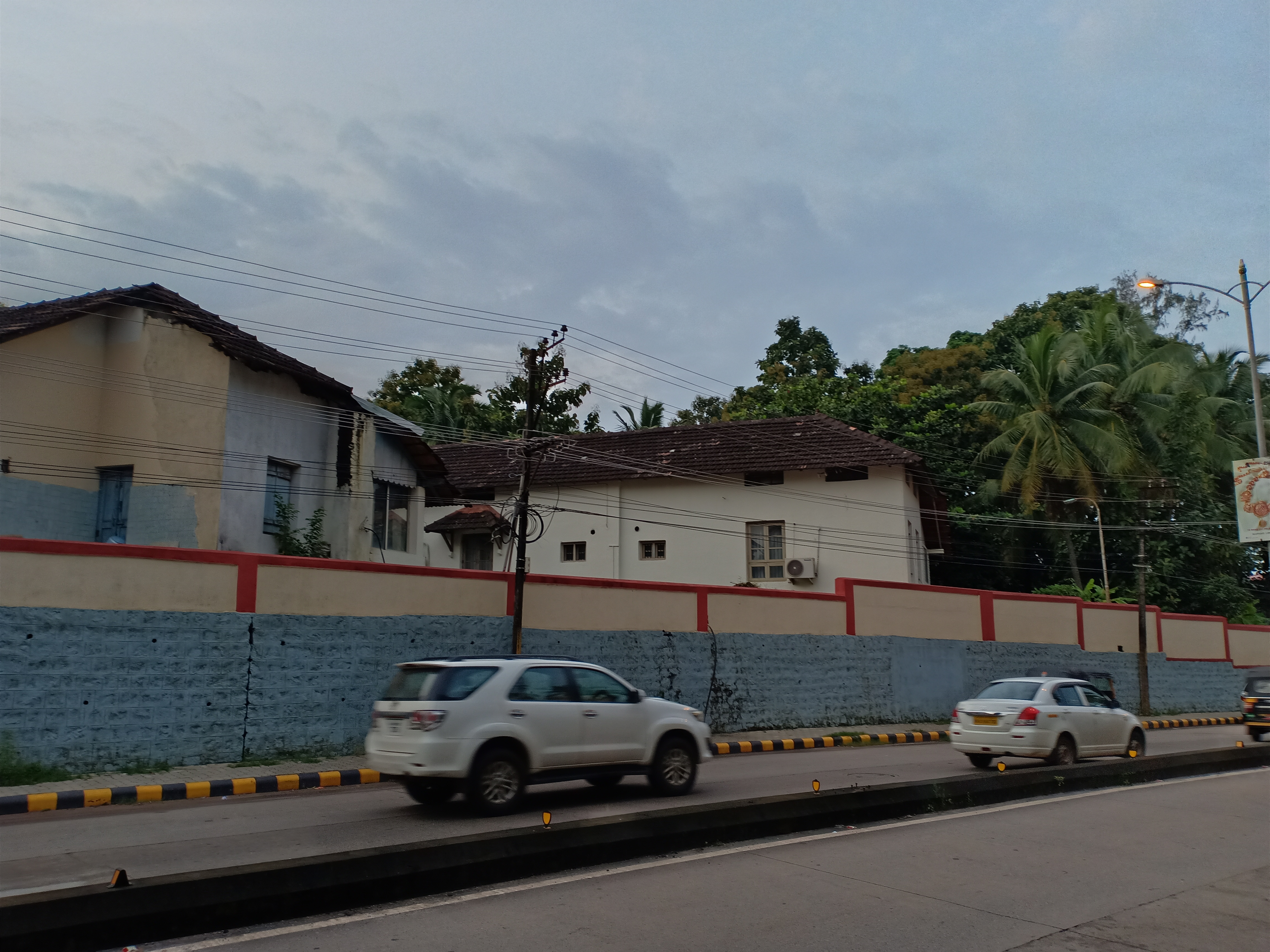
Agnes-Nanthoor Road

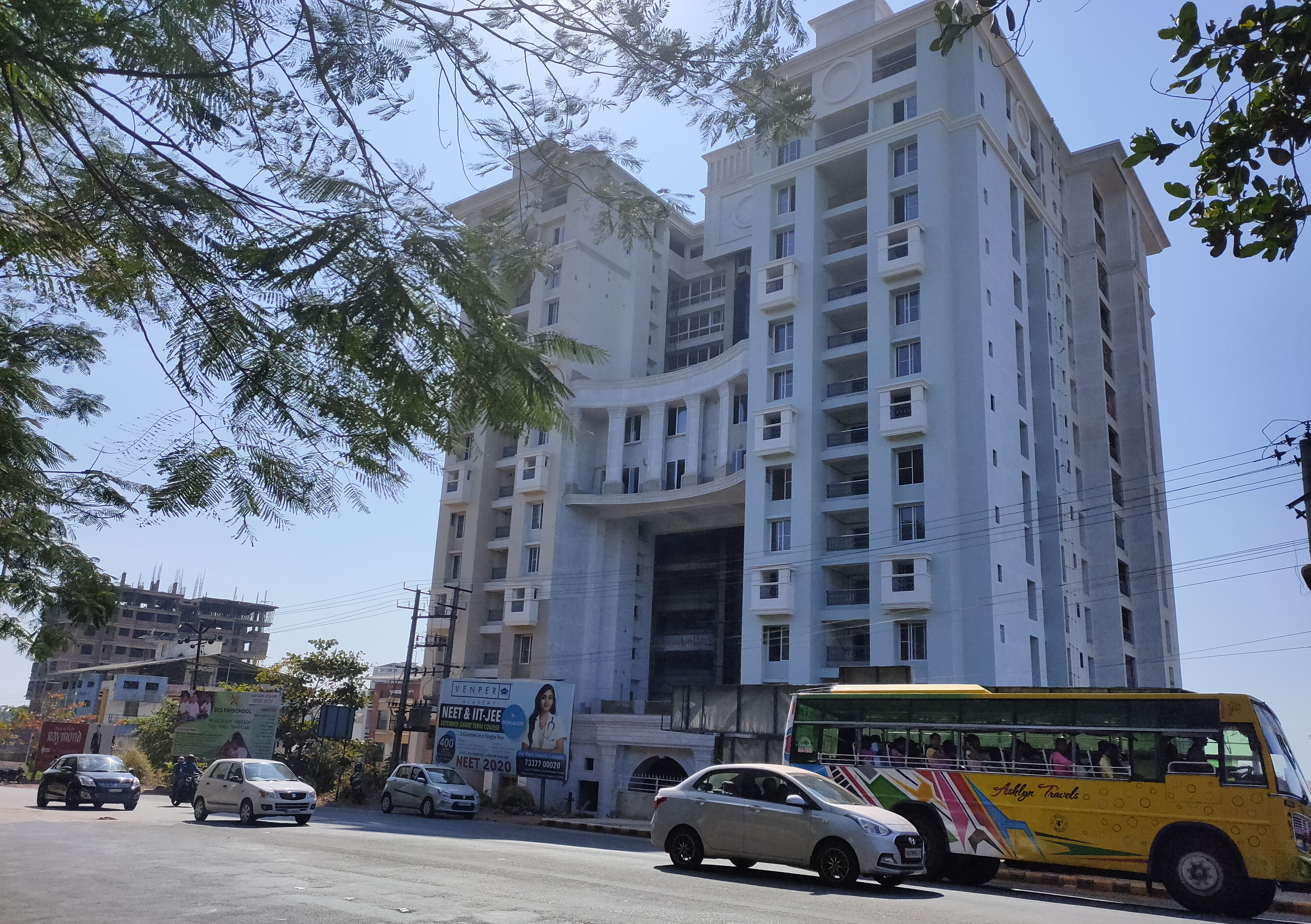
Nanthoor - Mallikatte Road
