= Padil =

- Locality
- Location in Mangalore city, Karnataka, India
- Coordinates: 12.837370278312851°N 74.87718090380129°E

Padil is a locality in Mangalore city of Karnataka state in India. The Mangalore Junction railway station is situated in this locality.

Proposed DC office is situated in Padil. It is just 2 km from pumpwell and 2.5 km from Rohan Mall.
