= Shree Vishnumurthy Temple =

Temple in Kulai, Karnataka, India

Coordinates: 12°57′50.1″N 74°48′36″E

Kulai Shree Vishnumurthy Temple in the town of Kulai, near Puttur, about 65 km from Mangalore, in the state of Karnataka, India, is a Hindu temple to Vishnu.

It is an 800-year-old structure. In 2022 both Muslims and Hindus have come together to contribute and renovate the temple. The Maniyani community of Madikai panchayat has allowed people of all religions to visit the temple.
