= Quadri (disambiguation) =

Quadri is a comune and town in the province of Chieti in the Abruzzo region of Italy.

Quadri may also refer to:

- Quadri (surname), surname
- Qaderi (or Qadri, Qadiri, Qadry, Kadri, or Quadri), an Arabic-language surname associated with the Sufi saint Abdul Qadir Gilani or his Qadiriyya order
- Caffè Quadri, coffeehouse located in the Procuratie Vecchie of Piazza San Marco, Venice
- Firdaus Quadri, a fictional character portrayed by Pranutan Bahl in the 2019 Indian film Notebook

== See also ==
- Kadri (disambiguation)
- Quadro, a graphics card brand of Nvidia
