= Mangaluru City Corporation =

Local civic body in Mangaluru, Karnataka, India

- ಮಂಗಳೂರು ಮಹಾನಗರ ಪಾಲಿಕೆ ಕುಡ್ಲ ಮಹಾನಗರ ಪಾಲಿಕೆ Maṅgaḷūru Mahānagara Pālike; Kudla Mahānagara Pālike
- Old logo of the Mangaluru City Corporation

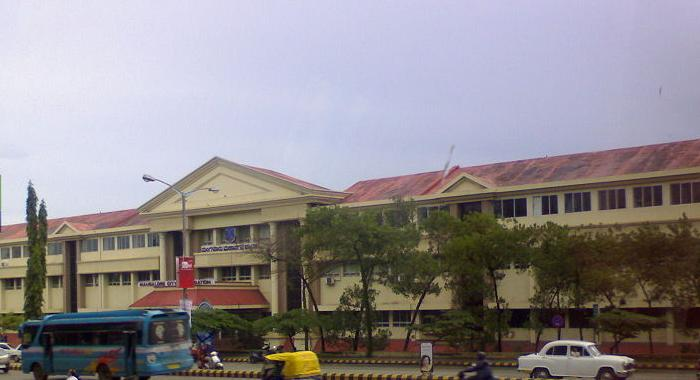
- MCC Head Office, M.G.Road, Lalbagh
- Formation: 1865
- Type: Municipal Corporation
- Headquarters: Mangaluru
- Official language: Kannada, English
- Mayor: Manoj Kumar (BJP)
- Deputy mayor: P.S. Bhanumathi (BJP)
- Website: Mangaluru City Corporation

The Mangaluru City Corporation is the municipal corporation responsible for overseeing the local administration of the Indian city of Mangaluru and it's suburbs, which are a major urban area and the most important port city of Karnataka state. The mechanism of municipal corporation was introduced in British India, with formation of the municipal corporation in Madras (Chennai) in 1688, followed by municipal corporations in Bombay (Mumbai) and Calcutta (Kolkata) in 1762. It consists of a legislative and an executive body. The legislative body is headed by the Mayor, while the executive body is headed by a Chief Commissioner.

== History ==
The council started its functions with 7 members who were then district officers. Most of them were Europeans. The Vice-President was the administrative officer. The income of the municipality was about Rs. 15,000. The population and the area of the town in the year 1866 were about 28,000 and one square mile respectively. In the year 1871, the population of the town was 29,712; and there were 6,619 houses out of which 4,341 were attached. A dispensary was started for the first time in 1868 at the site of the Lady Goschen Hospital. Subsequently a series of legislations under the Madras Presidency resulted in the gradual empowerment of the local administration and facilitated many welfare activities.

Following the re-organization of States, the Mysore Municipalities Act 1964 came into force as a uniform act throughout the state on 1 April 1965, replacing the Madras District Municipalities Act of 1920. The provisions of this act gave a new phase to the municipality and it became a city Municipality. Ample opportunities were made in the Act to raise the income and also to carry out some of the obligatory functions.

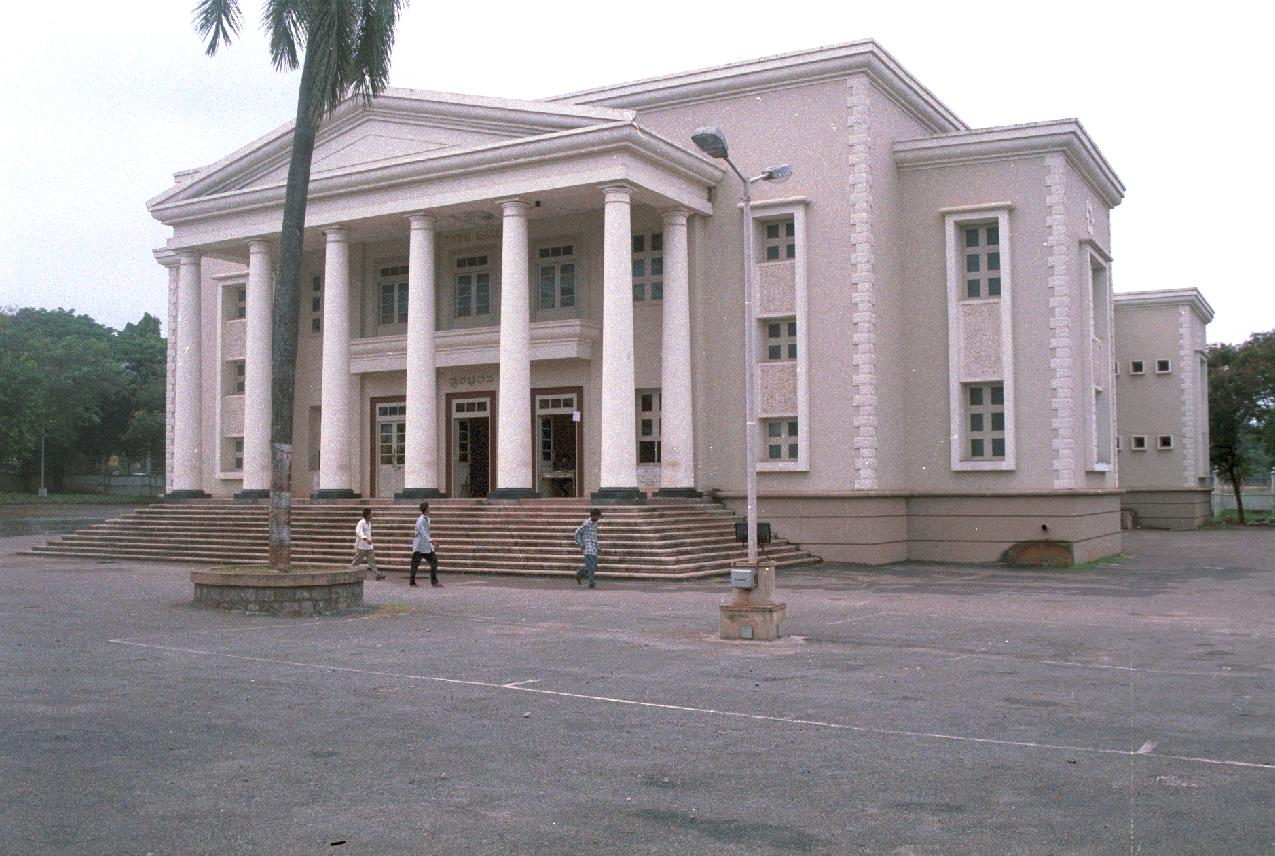
The Town Hall of Mangalore

Mangaluru City Corporation (MCC) came into existence during 3 July 1980, which was formerly a Municipality and was expanded during 1996–97 by including Surathkal Town Municipality, Katipalla Notified area, Panamboor, Baikampady, Kulai, Hosabettu villages. Further during April 2002, it was further extended to include Bajal, Kannuru, Kudupu and Thiruvail Panchayath limits into Mangalore City Corporation.

In the first election, the Congress came to power. Sadashiva Bhandary was the first Mayor of Mangaluru. Followed by B Abdul Khader Haji who served from 1984-1985 and was the first mayor coming from a minority community. Additionally Younis Britto was the first female Mayor of Mangaluru serving from 1993-1994 Congress was in power in 1990, 2002 and in 2013. There was administrator’s rule from 1995 to 1997. In 1997, neither the BJP nor the Congress could gain a majority, with the Congress winning 30 seats, the BJP 24 and the JD(S) 6 seats. The Congress – JD(S) coalition were in power in the Corporation.

The BJP won a majority in 2007 with 35 seats while the Congress got 20 seats. In spite of getting majority, owing to a faux pas by the BJP candidate Roopa Bangera, Congress corporator Gulzar Banu was elected mayor in the final tenure during the BJP’s term in 2012-13.

The election to the previous term of the MCC council was held on March 7, 2013, but the mayor was elected only in March 2014. A writ petition, filed by a corporator, challenging the reservation a roster notification of the government of August 2013, the high court stayed the notification and directed the government to reserve the post of mayor to a general category candidate and the deputy mayor’s post to a woman candidate of general category.

Mangaluru City Corporation presided by a mayor. Mangalore City Corporation currently has a population of more than 600,000 and area of 170 km^{2} and there is proposal to increase that to 304 km^{2} by including Mulky in the north and Ullal in the south. It is divided into 60 wards, each represented by a corporator. Elections to the corporation are held every five years and subsequently a mayor and a deputy mayor are elected for a term of one year. It comes under portion of two Lokasabha Constituencies, four Legislative assembly constituencies and one legislative council constituency.

The city corporation is now housed in its own premises located at M. G. Road, Lalbagh, Mangalore. Since its up-gradation as a city corporation, the civic body has spearheaded several developmental activities in the city and it has been adjudged as one of the best corporations in the state for 3 years continuously.

Mangaluru City Corporation (MCC) belongs to Mangalore City South and Mangalore City North constituencies in Karnataka Legislative Assembly and Dakshina Kannada - Lok Sabha constituency.

== Functions ==
MangaluruMangaluru City Corporation is created for the following functions:

- Planning for the town including its surroundings which are covered under its Department's Urban Planning Authority.
- Approving construction of new buildings and authorising use of land for various purposes.
- Improvement of the town's economic and Social status.
- Arrangements of water supply towards commercial,residential and industrial purposes.
- Planning for fire contingencies through Fire Service Departments.
- Creation of solid waste management,public health system and sanitary services.
- Working for the development of ecological aspect like development of Urban Forestry and making guidelines for environmental protection.
- Working for the development of weaker sections of the society like mentally and physically handicapped,old age and gender biased people.
- Making efforts for improvement of slums and poverty removal in the town.

== Revenue sources ==
The following are the Income sources for the Corporation from the Central and State Government.

=== Revenue from taxes ===
Following is the Tax related revenue for the corporation.

- Property tax.
- Profession tax.
- Entertainment tax.
- Grants from Central and State Government like Goods and Services Tax.
- Advertisement tax.

=== Revenue from non-tax sources ===
Following is the Non Tax related revenue for the corporation.

- Water usage charges.
- Fees from Documentation services.
- Rent received from municipal property.
- Funds from municipal bonds.

== Corporation Elections 2019 ==

Party	Seats
Bharatiya Janata Party (BJP)	44
Indian National Congress (INC)	14
Social Democratic Party of India (SDPI)	2
Total	60
Source :

== List of mayors ==
#	Name	Ward	Term			Election	Party
	Diwakar Pandeshwar	Cantonment	28 February 2020	28 February 2021	1 year, 0 days	2019	Bharatiya Janata Party
	Premanand Shetty	Mangaladevi	2 March 2021	8 September 2022	1 year, 190 days	2019	Bharatiya Janata Party
	Jayanand Anchan	Kadri Padavu	9 September 2022	8 September 2023	364 days	2019	Bharatiya Janata Party
	Sudheer Shetty	Kodialbail	8 September 2023	18 September 2024	1 year, 10 days	2019	Bharatiya Janata Party
	Manoj Kumar	Derebail North	19 September 2024	27 February 2025	161 days	2019	Bharatiya Janata Party

== Wards under the MCC ==
There are 60 wards administered by the Mangalore City Corporation. They are:

1. Surathkal (West)
2. Surathkal (East)
3. Katipalla (East)
4. Katipalla-Krishnapura
5. Katipalla (North)
6. Iddya (East)
7. Iddya (West)
8. Hosabettu
9. Kulai (Suratkal)
10. Baikampady
11. Panambur
12. Panjimogaru
13. Kunjathbail (North)
14. Marakada
15. Kunjathbail (South)
16. Bangrakulur
17. Derebail (North)
18. Kavoor
19. Pachanady
20. Tiruvail
21. Padavu (West)
22. Kadri Padavu
23. Derebail (East)
24. Derebail (South)
25. Derebail (West)
26. Derebail (South-west)
27. Boloor
28. Mannagudda
29. Kambla
30. Kodialbail
31. Bejai
32. Kadri (North)
33. Kadri (South)
34. Shivabagh
35. Padavu (Central)
36. Padavu (East)
37. Maroli
38. Bendoor
39. Falnir
40. Court
41. Central Market
42. Dongerkery
43. Kudroli
44. Bunder
45. Port
46. Cantonment
47. Milagres
48. Kankanady-Valencia
49. Kankanady
50. Alape (South)
51. Alape (North)
52. Kannur
53. Bajal
54. Jeppinamogaru
55. Attavar
56. Mangaladevi
57. Hoige Bazaar
58. Bolar
59. Jeppu
60. Bengre

== Notable people ==
- Rajani Duganna, politician and former mayor
- Gulzar Banu, politician and former mayor
- Praveen Kumar (Mangalore politician), politician and former mayor
