= Derebail =

- Locality
- Location within Karnataka
- Coordinates: 12.8126°N 74.8419°E
- Country: India
- State: Karnataka
- District: Dakshina Kannada
- City: Mangalore

Government
  - Body: Mangalore City Corporation

Languages
  - Official: Kannada, Tulu
- Time zone: UTC+5:30 (IST)

Derebail is a locality, situated about 6 kilometres from the heart of Mangalore city.

Derebail spans over 5 corporate wards in the Mangalore City Corporation (Wards no. 17, 23, 24, 25 and 26). The total official population in the region, comprising these 5 wards, according to the 2011 Census is 47,132.

Hollywood actress Freida Pinto hails from Derebail.
