= Vas lane =

Vas Lane
- Locality
- Location in Mangaluru city, Karnataka, India
- Coordinates: 12.851330261134092°N 74.84715090370112°E

Vas Lane is a neighborhood in the city of Mangaluru, Karnataka, India. It is among the preferred locations of Mangaluru.

== Location ==
Vas Lane is situated adjacent to Balmatta-Bendoorwell Road, and it extends all the way up to Unity Hospital in Falnir. It is well connected by city buses i.e. all the buses plying towards Kankanady stop at Vaslane. The nearest market is the Kankanady Market.

Vas Lane also lends its name to the two most famous bakeries in Mangalore called Vas Bakery. One is located in Balmatta and the other one near Bendoorwell, opposite to St Agnes College. https://www.vasbakery.com/about/story for more information they have this website they have the story
