= Aloyseum =

Museum in Karnataka, India

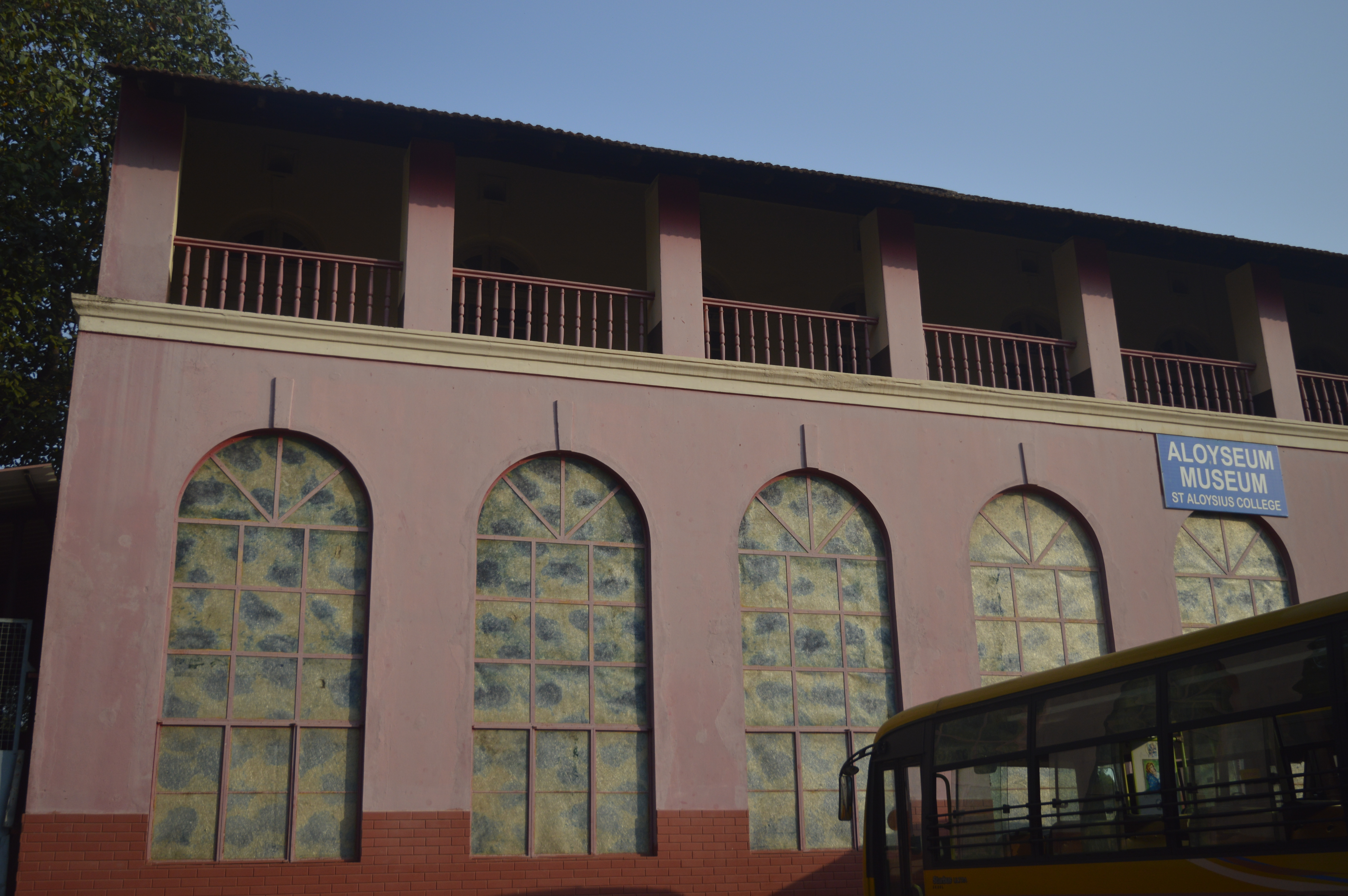
- Aloyseum museum

- Location at Mangaluru
- Established: 1913
- Location: Mangaluru, Karnataka, India
- Coordinates: 12.8576963°N 74.8714508°E
- Type: Museum

Aloyseum is a museum on the St Aloysius College campus in Mangaluru city of Karnataka in India. It was established in the year 1913.

== History ==
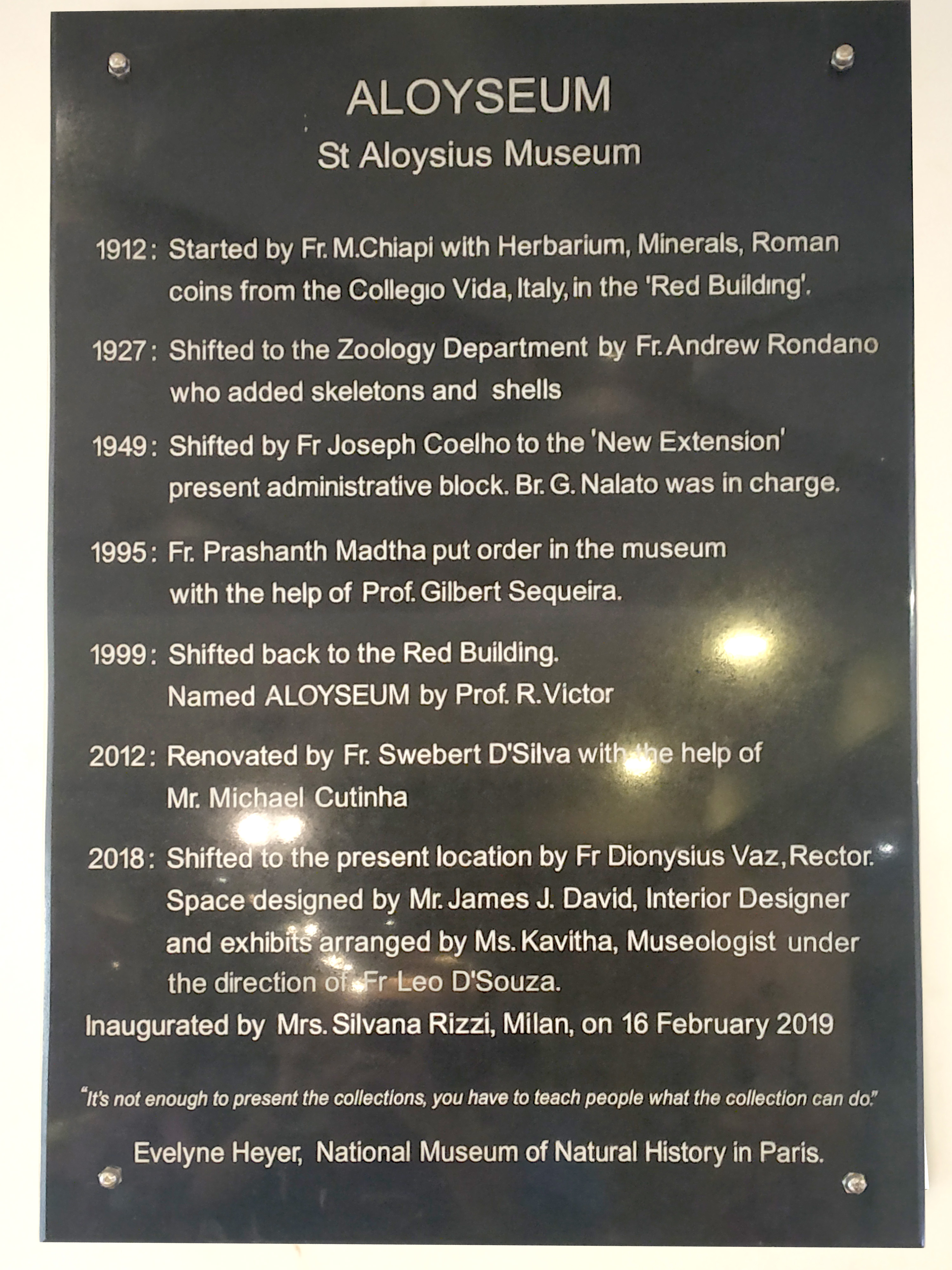
St Aloysius College Museum

This museum began in 1913 when an Italian Jesuit priest named Chiapi donated around 2000 different types of minerals, Herbarium and a collection of Roman coins. In 1906, the De Dion car was the first automobile that was used in Mangaluru. It was imported to Mangalore by P F X Saldanha of the Highland Coffee Works. This car is one of the souvenirs present in this museum. The museum also has a collection of domestic and agricultural utensils used by the ancient generation.

== Exhibition galleries ==
This museum contains artifacts such as stone age tools, postal stamps, Roman coins, pieces of the Berlin Wall, drawings of Antonio Moscheni, paintings of European artists, spears and arrows of Abyssinia, Neolithic stone axe, telegraphic equipment, Mangalore's first car and generator, whale skeleton, old musical instruments, etc.
