= Nagori =

Breed of cattle

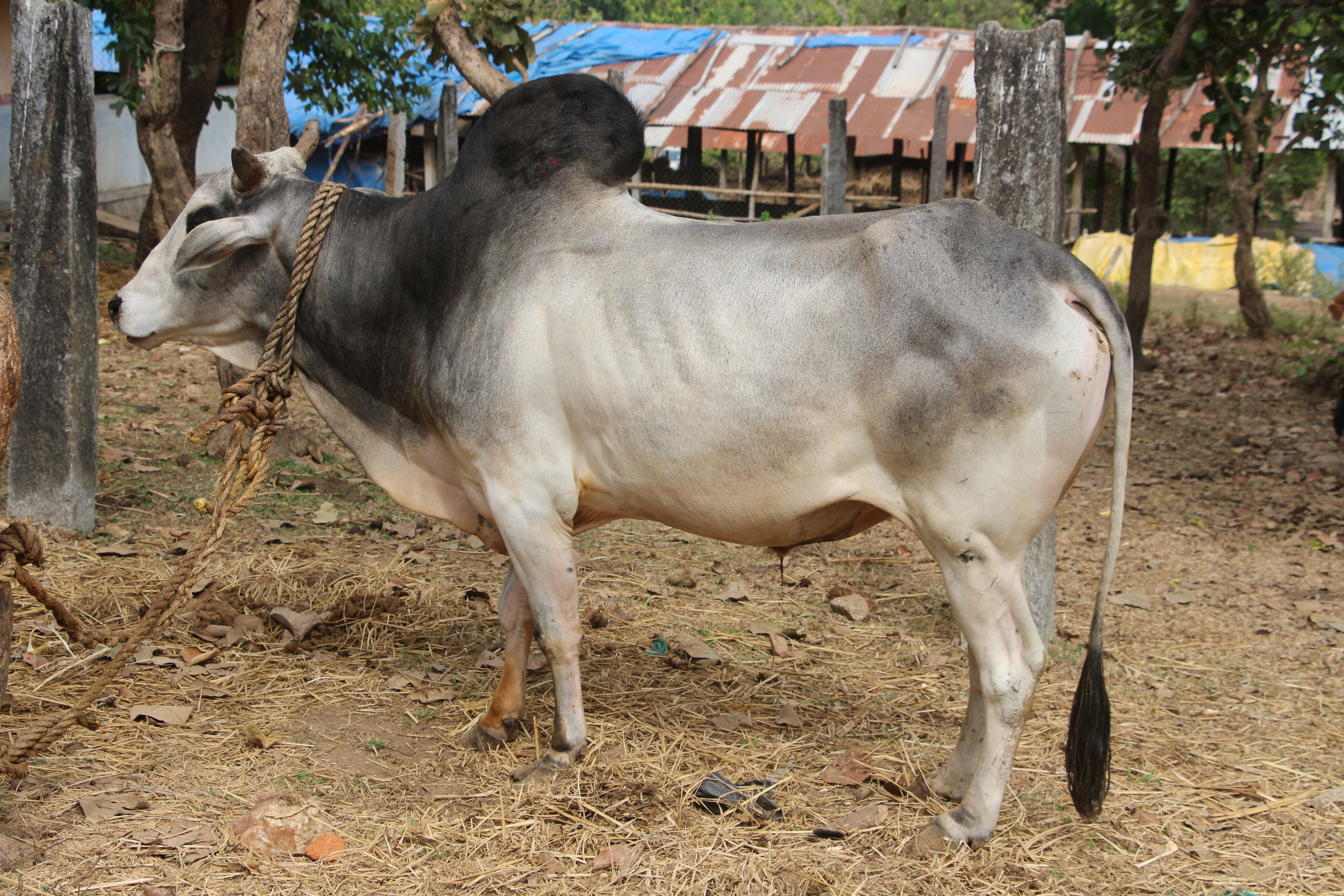
Nagori Bull

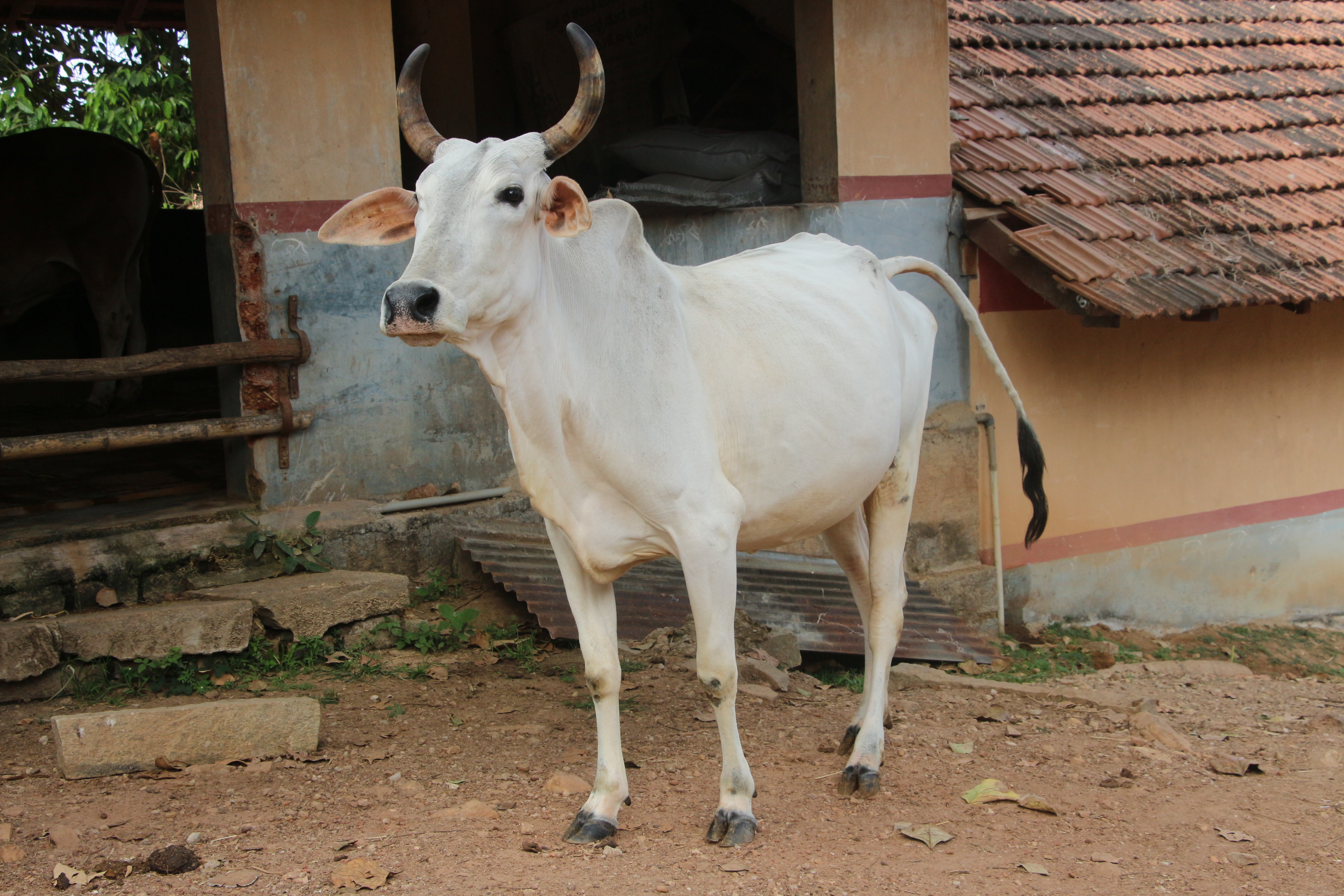
Nagori Cow

Nagori is a cattle breed from Rajasthan, India. It is a draught breed, mainly used for agricultural purposes. It is known to have originated in Nagaur district of Rajasthan.

== See also ==
- List of breeds of cattle
