= Srimanthi Bhai Memorial Government Museum =

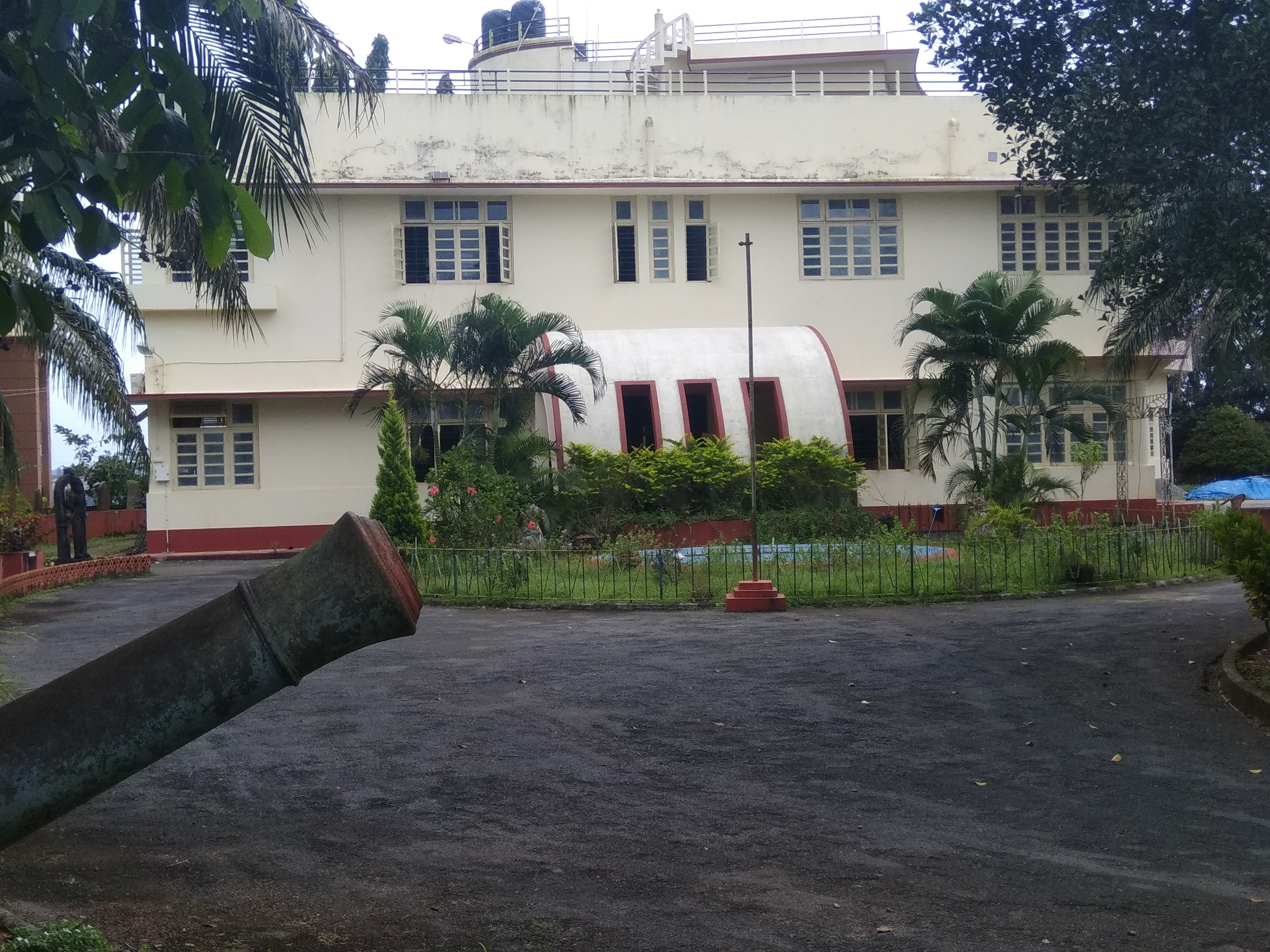
- Srimanthi Bhai Memorial Government Museum

- Location within Karnataka
- Established: 4 May 1960
- Location: Bejai Road, Mangaluru, Karnataka
- Coordinates: 12.887000°N 74.846491°E
- Type: Historic house museum
- Visitors: 1 million

Srimanthi Bhai Memorial Government Museum Mangalore, Karnataka, Collection of archaeological and geological artefacts, a unit of Directorate of Archaeology & Museums Karnataka was founded on 4 May 1960 by Sri B.D Jatti, the chief minister of Karnataka Government. The museum is located in Mangalore, the coastal land of Karnataka.

== History ==
The major portions of the collections were made by Col. V.R. Mirajkar. He was a medical officer at Lahore during the Second World War in the British Indian Army. The museum was his living house, designed and constructed in nearly the same blueprint as the building structures of Milan, Italy, in the year 1935, and it looks like a ship. Later, the house was donated to the government of Karnataka in 1955, along with all the collection of antiques and contemporary masterpieces acquired during his trips within and outside India. Thereafter, it was transformed into a museum and named in honour and memory of his mother, Srimanthi Bhai. It houses antiquities and historical collections that depict the culture and lifestyle of ancient civilizations as well as arts and crafts.

== Exhibition galleries ==
- The Museum exhibitions consist of Tulunadu's unique Bootharathane idol, Muga(Mask), utensils.
- Paleolithic & Neolithic stone tools, coins, metal utensils, wooden furniture, musical instruments, ethnological materials, arms & armours, replicas of the Harappa & Mahenjodaro, Gandhara & Takshahshila School of art, Warangal, Nagarajunakonda, Saranath, Konark, Kushana, Ahimchatra, Tulunadu, and local regions.
- Animals seals, wooden panels, gigantic wooden figurines, porcelain materials, musical instruments, lamps, clock, wooden god figurines and other antiques for historical seeking aspects of local people.

=== Painting ===
The exhibition covers traditional attire, contemporary scenes, portraits, nature of both oil and water painting by various identified and unidentified artists.

The first floor of the building is dedicated to collections made by col. V. R. Mirajkar. He had collected a huge variety of handicrafts from India and also from China, Nepal, Czechoslovakia, Africa, Denmark, Persia, Germany, Japan, Turkey, Brittan, Italy, Tibet, Russia, Venice, Paris, & London. Many of his contemporary collections are unique and have become antique pieces now. Wooden furniture, glass panels, silver & ivory objects, shells, cigar boxes, a variety of lighters, wooden objects, glass materials, metal objects, etc. were personally used by him.

=== Gandhiji photo gallery ===
Gandhiji's photo gallery exhibits his collections of Gandhiji's rare photographs. It reflects the life cycle of Gandhiji from birth until the end of the journey. Life in Africa: rallies, non-cooperation movements, Dandi March, Satyagraha, photos depicting Gandhi with Nehru, Jinnah, Kasturba, Rabindranath Tagore, Subhash Chandra Bose, Sardar Patel, Lord Mount Batten, and other historic figures of our nation. Collections of Gandhiji's letters written to Andrews, Wardha, and others

=== Kids section ===
Kids section contains a collection of performing puppets, dolls of Yakshagana and Buta Kola, bird & animals figurines, planes, boat models, photographs, wooden models, ethnical & bhootha aaradane Uru of Tulunadu

=== Stones ===
Outer premises cover hero stone, Maha Sati Kallu of Tulunadu, Tulu, Kannada inscriptions, statues of soldiers, Jaina, serpent-nagastones and Cannons collected from Jamlabad Fort, Belthangady which are belongings made between 14th to 16th century AD.
