= Mannagudda =

- Locality
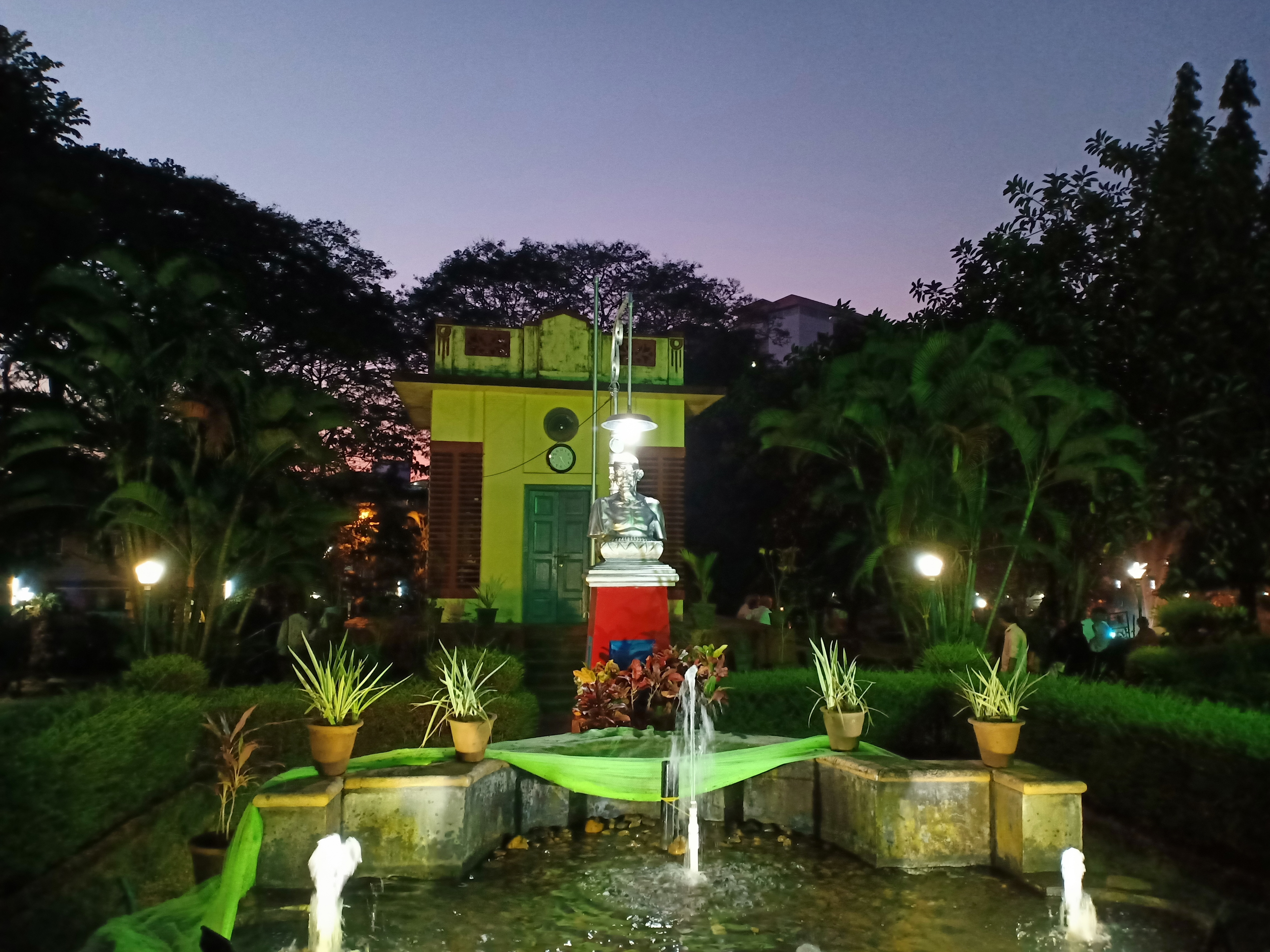
- Mahatma Gandhi Park at Mannagudda

- Location in Mangalore city, Karnataka, India
- Coordinates: 12.856470277124084°N 74.85718090380021°E

Mannagudda is a locality in Mangalore city of Karnataka state in India.
