= Light House Hill =

Lighthouse in India

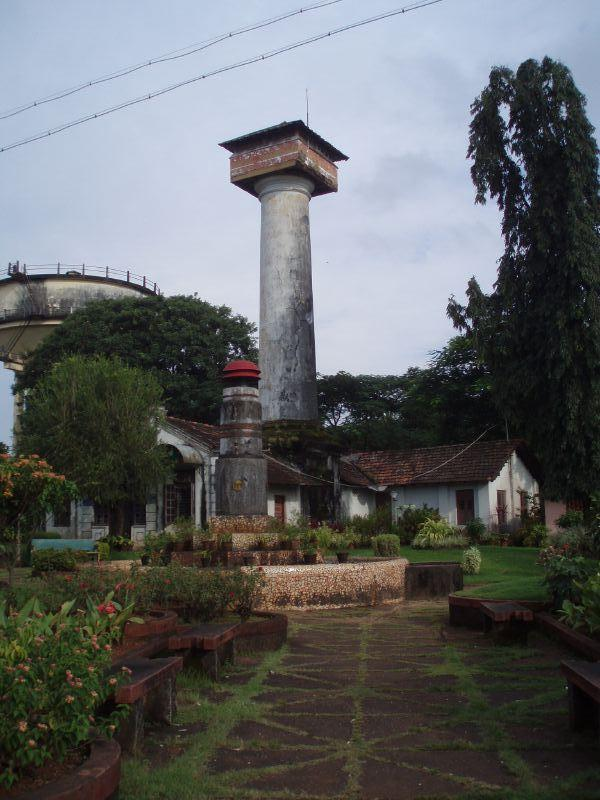
The Light House at Tagore Park

Light House Hill is situated in Hampankatta, the heart of Mangaluru in the southern India. It was built by Hyder Ali and was used as watch tower for Sultanate of Mysore Navy.

== Educational institutions ==
Light House Hill is the location of two famous educational institutions in Mangaluru, namely St. Aloysius College and Kasturba Medical College.

== Religious places ==
The famous religious places here are the St. Aloysius Chapel and the Idgah Mosque.

== Public utilities ==
The City Central Library is located close to St Aloysius college. This library is run by the Mangaluru City Corporation. There are several branches for city central library within Mangaluru.

== The lighthouse ==
The first lighthouse of Mangaluru is located in the heart of the Mangaluru city. This "Light House" was built by Hyder Ali, the de facto ruler of Mysore. It stood as the watch tower of Sultanate of Mysore Navy under him and his son Tipu Sultan. The huge watchtower on the hill served as a base for the British, from where many resident commanders of the British Navy would monitor the movement of travelling ships. The base of the light house has a library, with a reading room named after Karnad Sadashiv Rao, a renowned freedom fighter.
