= Kulai (Mangaluru) =

- Residential locality
- Country: India
- State: Karnataka
- District: Dakshina Kannada

Government
  - Body: Mangalore City Corporation

Languages
  - Official: Kannada
- Time zone: UTC+5:30 (IST)
- Vehicle registration: KA 19
- City: Mangalore
- Website: karnataka.gov.in

Kulai is a locality in the northern part of Mangaluru, India. It is near Surathkal.

It houses two well-known temples, namely Shree Vishnumurthy Temple and Chitrapura Shree Durga Parameshwari Temple. The area was covered with paddy fields, coconut gardens and forest, but is now a residential/commercial area. Kulai comes under the Mangalore City North constituency.

There is also a Kulai Fishing Harbour close by. The project was estimated at Rs. 196.51 crore. The construction of a northern breakwater for the harbour was partly completed in October 2024 before it was temporarily halted.
