= Pumpwell =

Locality in Mangalore, Karnataka, India

Pumpwell is one of the busiest junctions in Mangalore, Karnataka, India. It is just 3 kilometres (1.9 mi) away from Hampankatta, a major commercial centre, 3 kilometres (1.9 mi) from Mangalore Central railway station, and 2.3 kilometres (1.4 mi) from Mangalore Junction railway station. Karnataka Bank, one of the major public sector banks of India, has a head office at Pumpwell. The junction plays a significant role in city transport due to the number of important roads including NH-66, Virajpet-Byndoor road that passes through this location. Mangalore - Bangalore highway NH-75, which connects two big cities of Karnataka, originates here. Additionally, there is a proposal to build new a bus stand under public-private-partnership (PPP) mode at this location.

== Notable places ==
- Capitanio School
- Indiana Hospital & Heart institute
- Karnataka Bank Head office
