= Attavar =

- Locality
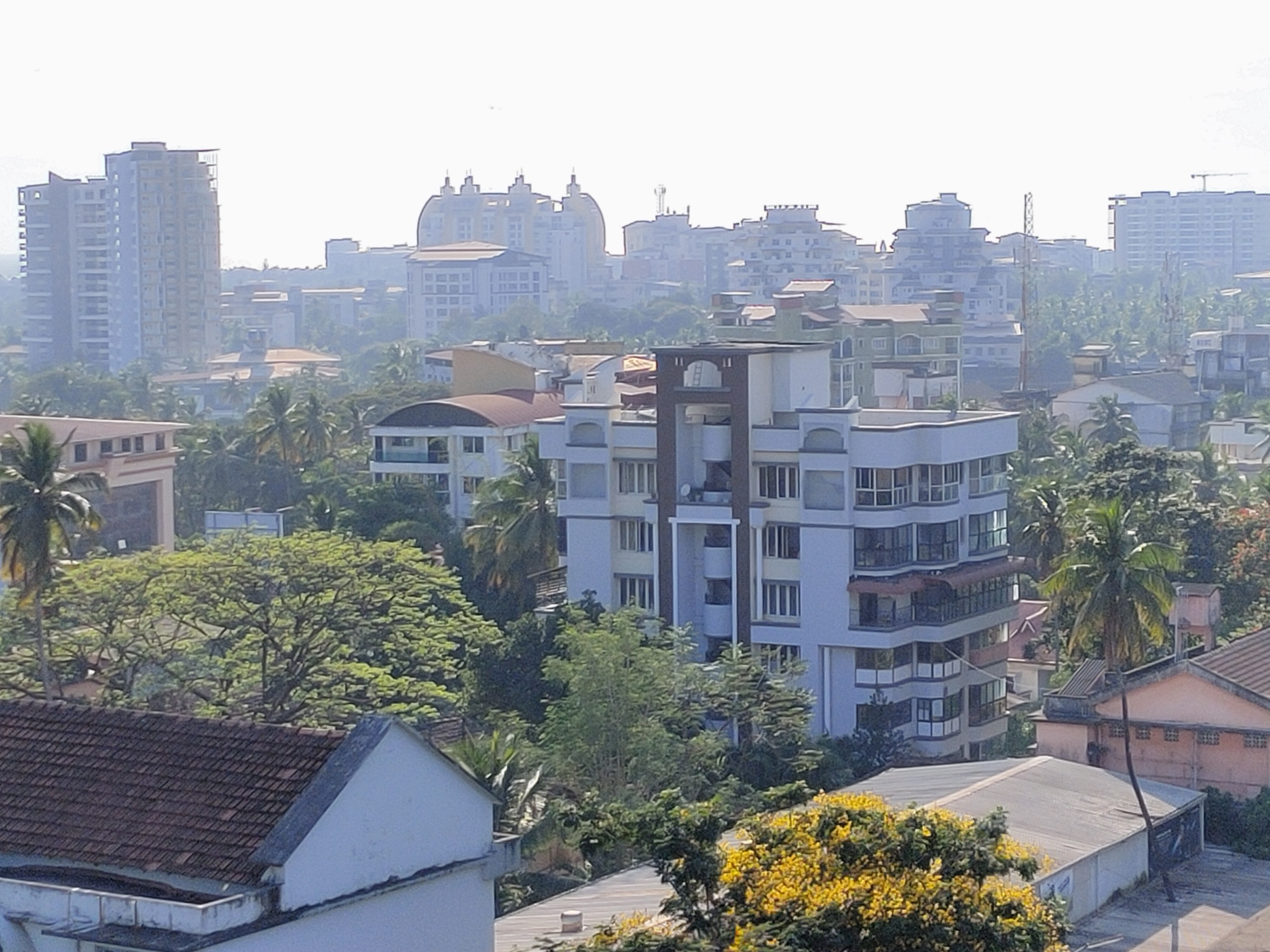
- Attavar Skyline

- Location in Mangalore, Karnataka Location in India
- Coordinates: 12.8513680276124083°N 74.85720190380127°E
- Country: India
- State: Karnataka
- City: Mangalore
- Time zone: UTC+5:30 (Indian Standard Time)

Attavar or Attavara is one of the upscale residential & commercial localities in Mangalore city, Karnataka, India.

== Places of service relevance ==
The following are other important points of public interest:

=== Chakrapani Temple ===
This is a temple dedicated to Sri Krishna in Attavar. A locally popular annual community festival known as "Mosaru Kudike" is celebrated following Shri Krishna Janmaastami under the aegis of this temple.

=== Shri Umamaheshwara Temple ===
Shri Umamaheshwara Temple is an ancient temple dedicated to Shiva along with Parvathi temple, which was renovated in the year 2003. The Shri Mahaganapathi idol (called "Kote Ganapathi", used by kings and soldiers to pray before they went to war about 700 to 800 years ago, as mentioned by research archaeologist Dr. Gururaja Bhat) now placed in this temple is the oldest in the Coastal Karnataka. The idol was found while digging to build a memorial building in the memory of World War II soldiers, now the District Collectors (D.C.) office Red Building. The procession of "Mosaru Kudike" during Krishna Janmastami started in the year 1909 from this temple and is now a regular annual festival.

=== Arasu (Daiyongulu) - Mundattaya (Vaidyanatha) Daivasthana ===
This is one of the oldest daivastana in Mangalore district. Along the coastal belt it is popularly known as "Attavara Arasu-Mundattaya". The daivastana has a very old history with connection to the Jain Ballals who ruled the Mangalore state (during those days Mangalore had been referred as "Mangalooru seeme") under the Vijayanagara kingdom. The "Arasu" daiva is also called as "Daiyongulu", whereas the "Mundattaya" daiva is known by the other name "Vaidyanatha". These two daivas are of different origin. Mundattaya was originated from Attavara whereas Arasu is believed to have come from Udyavara's "Arasu-Manjishnaar" daivasthana.

Mosaru Kudike was first started in Attavar. It started with a small function with a celebration in the Vaidyanatha Daivastana. It has since become the festival of Attavar village and the celebration of the procession of Shree Krishna through Attavara. 2009 marked the hundredth year of Mosaru Kudike.

More details can be found in the "Paad^dana" which was collected by Rev. Fr. A. Manner, a German citizen, in 1886. This was published by the Basel Mission, a British missionary, during the British rule in India. The book is a very good collection of "Paad^dana" of many daivas. "Paad^dana" is a series of folk stories related to the daiva, which can be vocalized in the form of a song.
