= Falnir =

- Commercial & Residential Locality
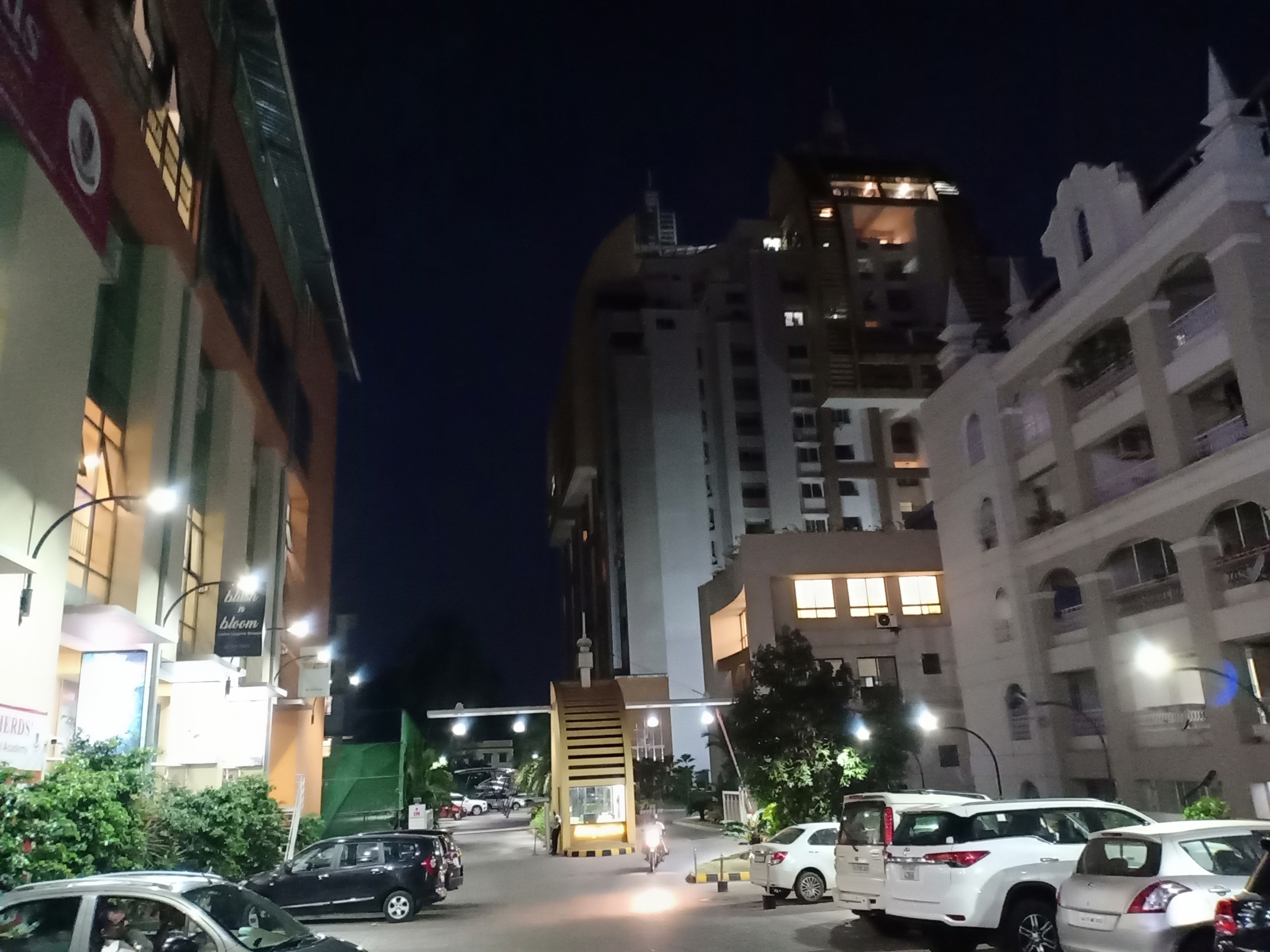
- Ivory Towers apartments at Falnir

- Location in Mangaluru city, Karnataka, India
- Coordinates: 12.789670277214043°N 74.85718090380132°E
- Country: India
- State: Karnataka
- District: Dakshina Kannada
- Taluk: Mangaluru
- City: Mangaluru

Falnir is an upscale commercial and residential locality in Mangaluru city, Karnataka, India.

== See also ==
- Pandeshwar
- Vas lane
