= Kadri, Mangaluru =

Kadri
- Commercial & Residential locality
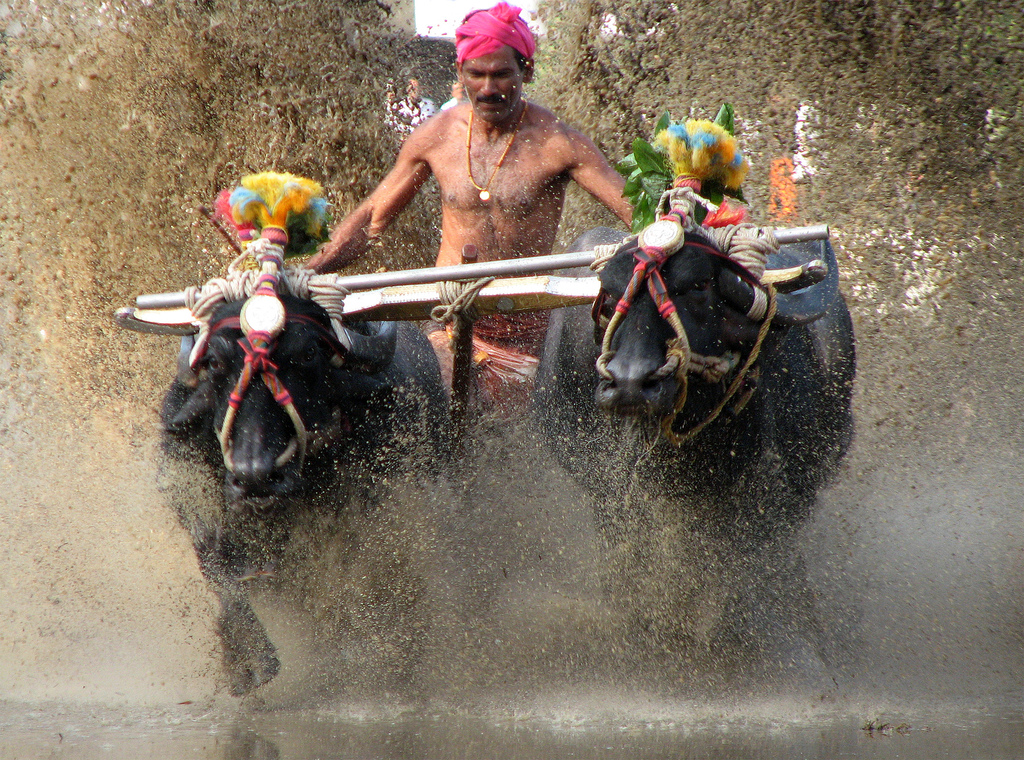
- Kambala Race of Kadri
- Interactive map of Kadri
- Country: India
- State: Karnataka
- District: Dakshina Kannada
- City: Mangaluru

Government
  - Body: Mangaluru City Corporation

Languages
  - Official: Kannada
- Time zone: UTC+5:30 (IST)

Kadri is a locality in the city of Mangalore in Karnataka, India.

As of 2020 the Bhandary Vertica, a 56-storey building that would be one of the tallest buildings in South India, was under construction there.

== Notable sites ==
- Kadri Park
- Kadri Manjunath Temple

== Gallery ==
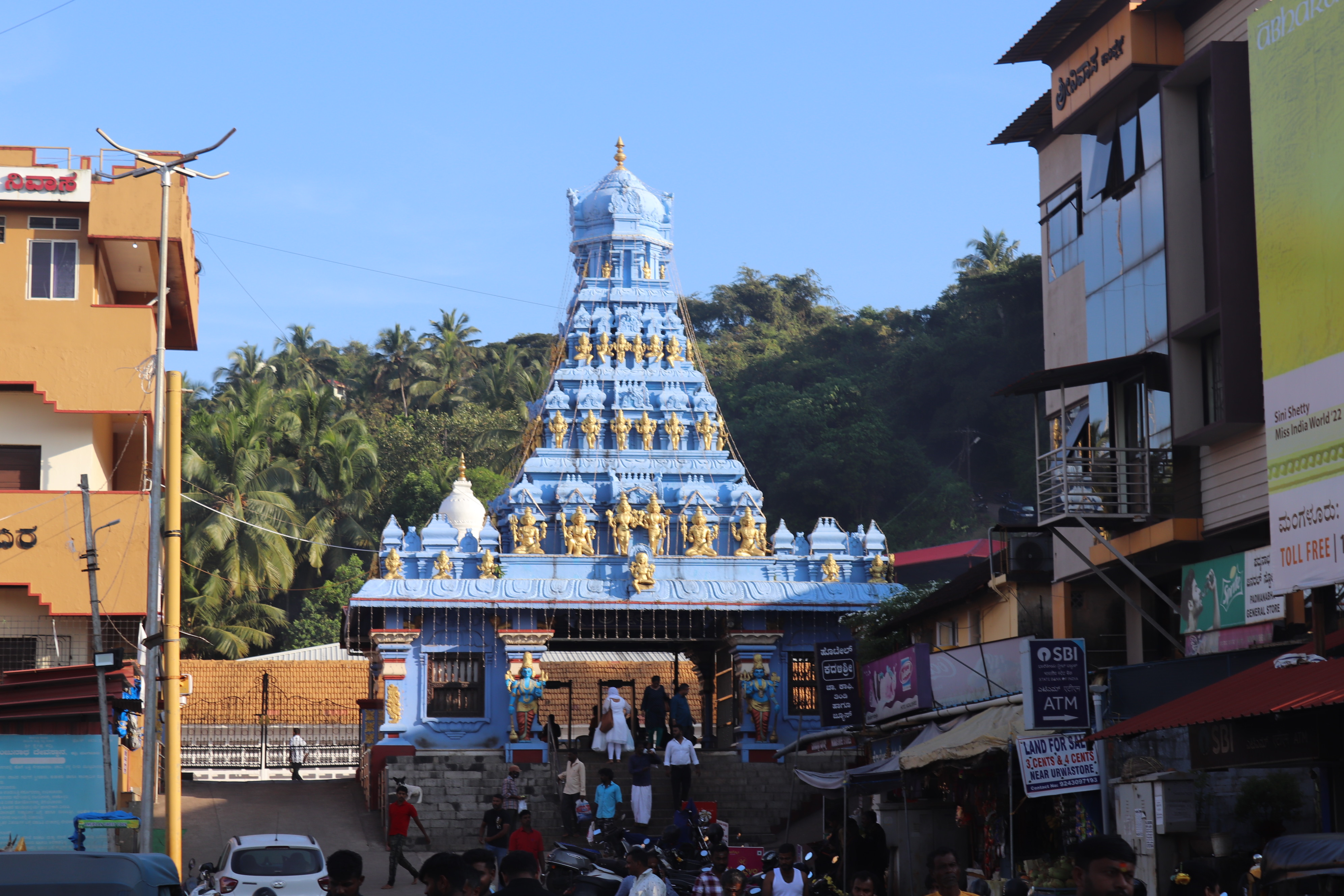
Kadri Manjunath temple entrance

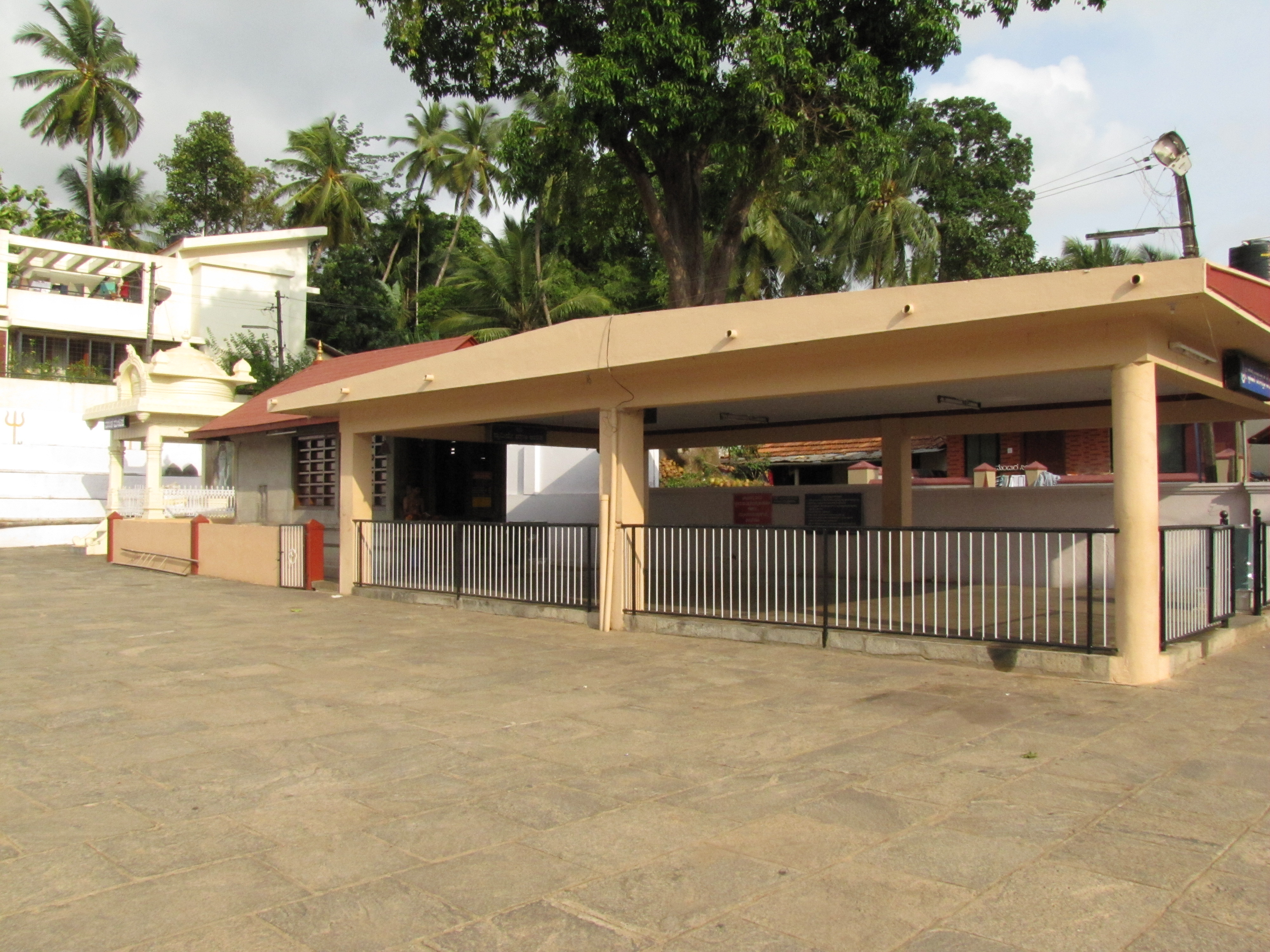
Dharmastha temple at Kadri

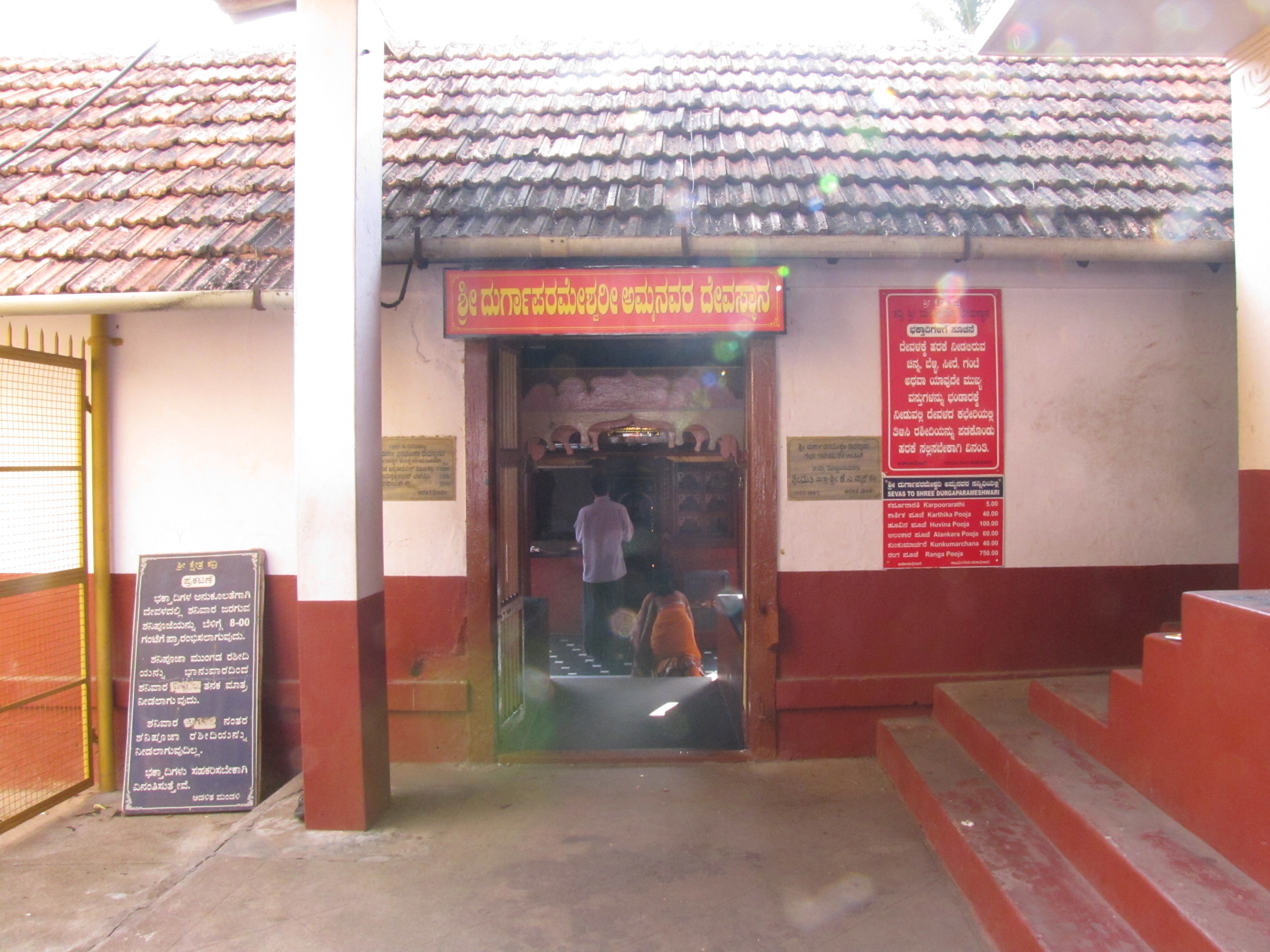
Durga Temple, Kadri

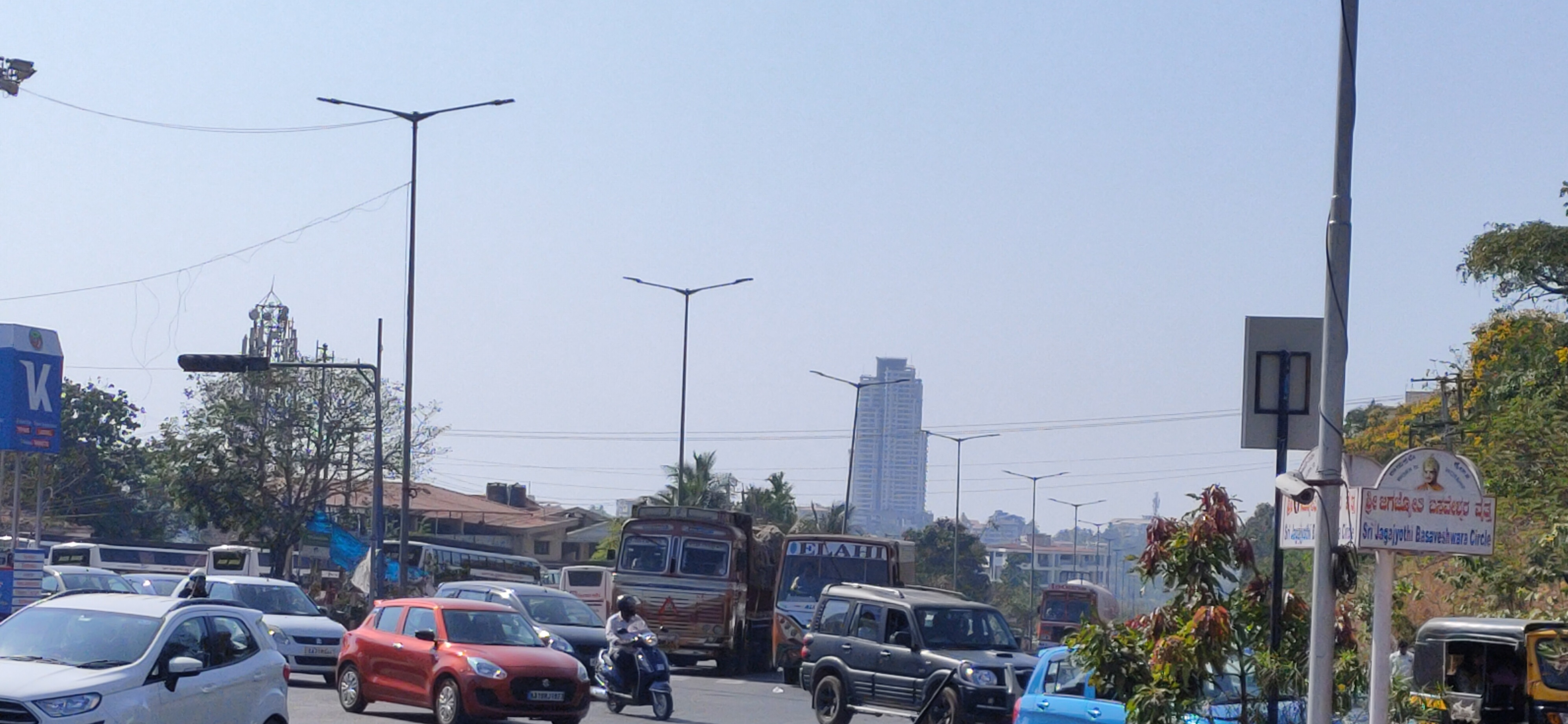
KPT Junction, Kadri, Mangalore

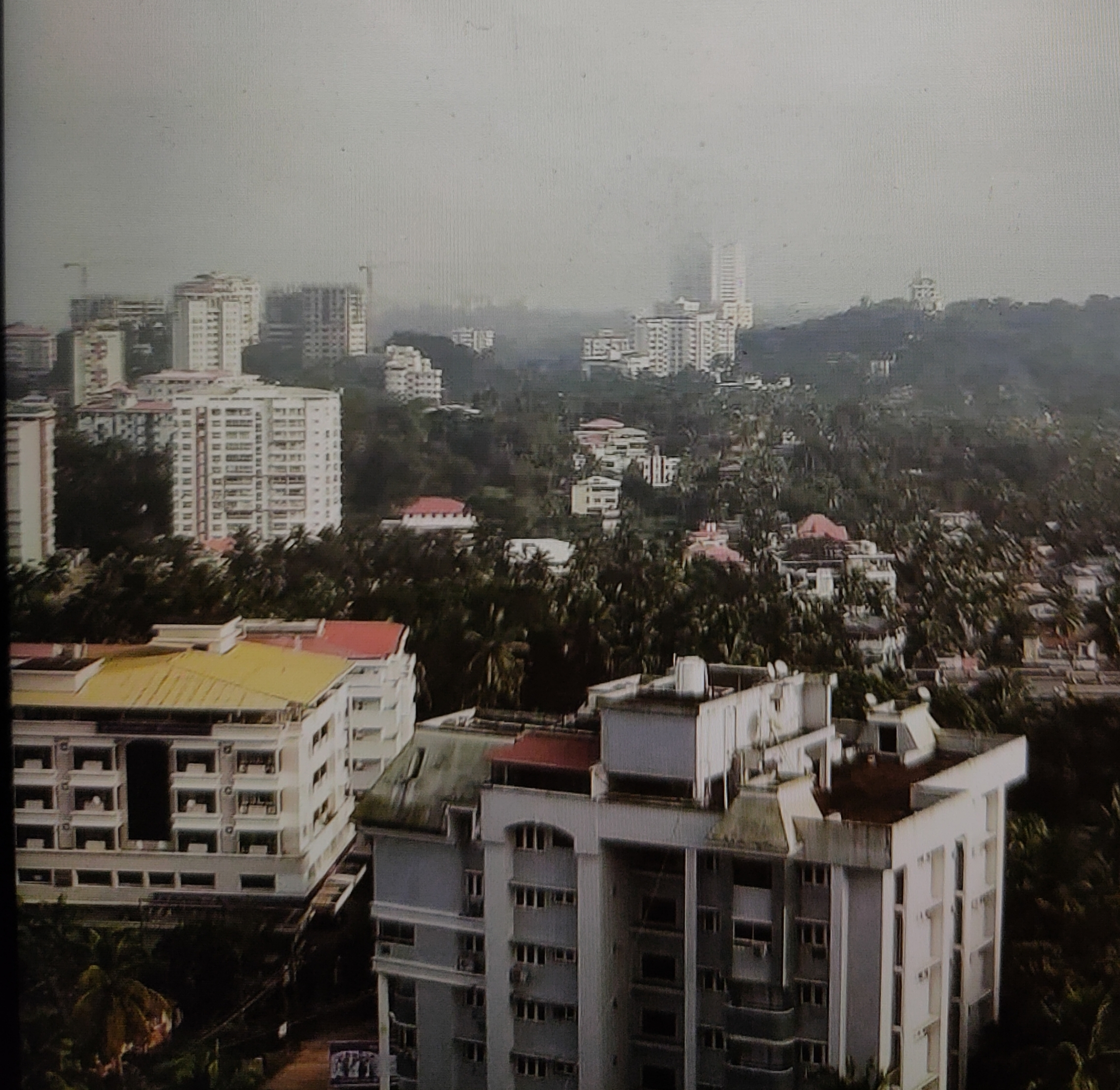
A panoramic view of highrise buildings, Kadri

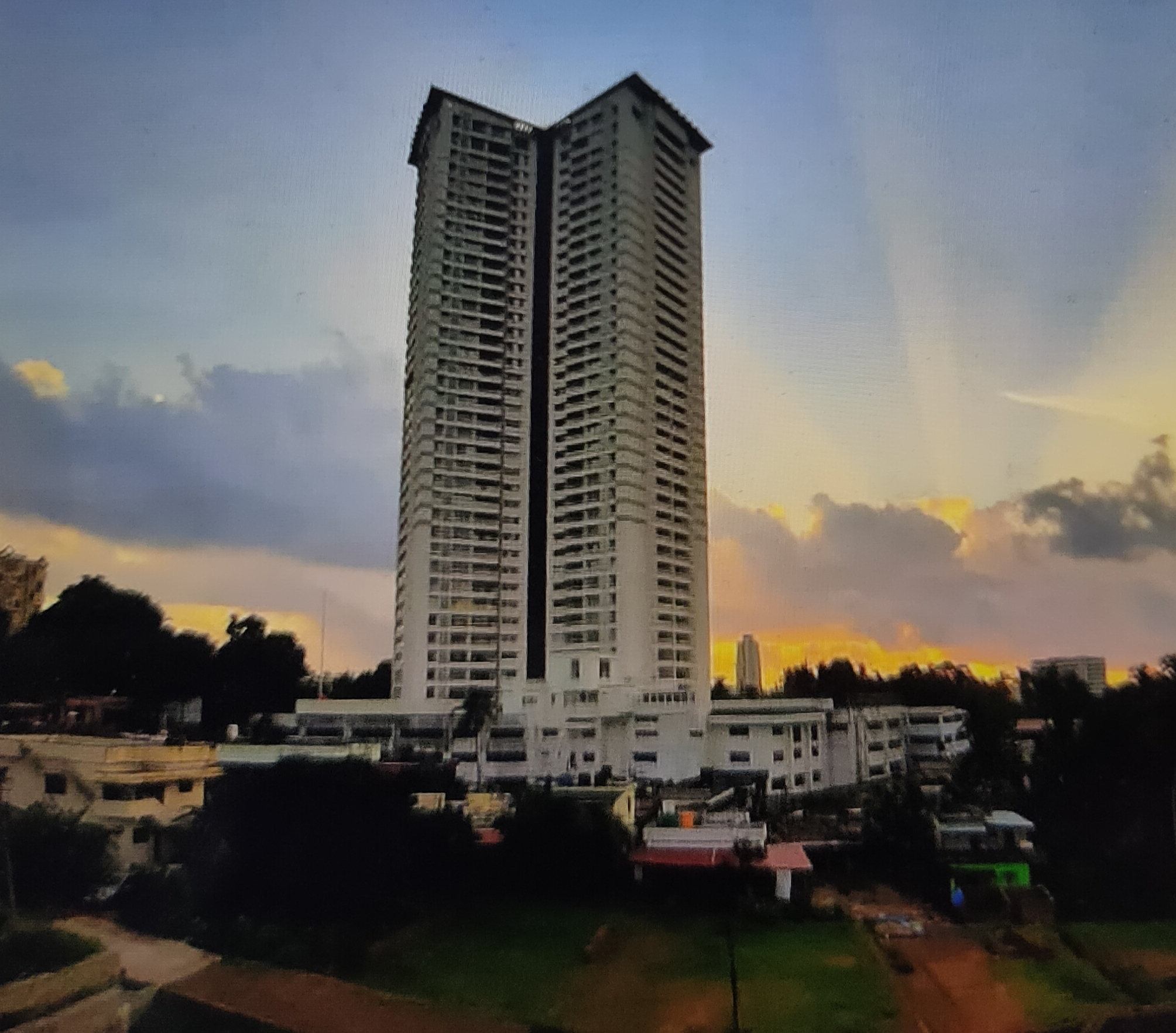
Planet SKS, the tallest pure residential building of Karnataka, Kadri
