= Pilikula Nisargadhama =

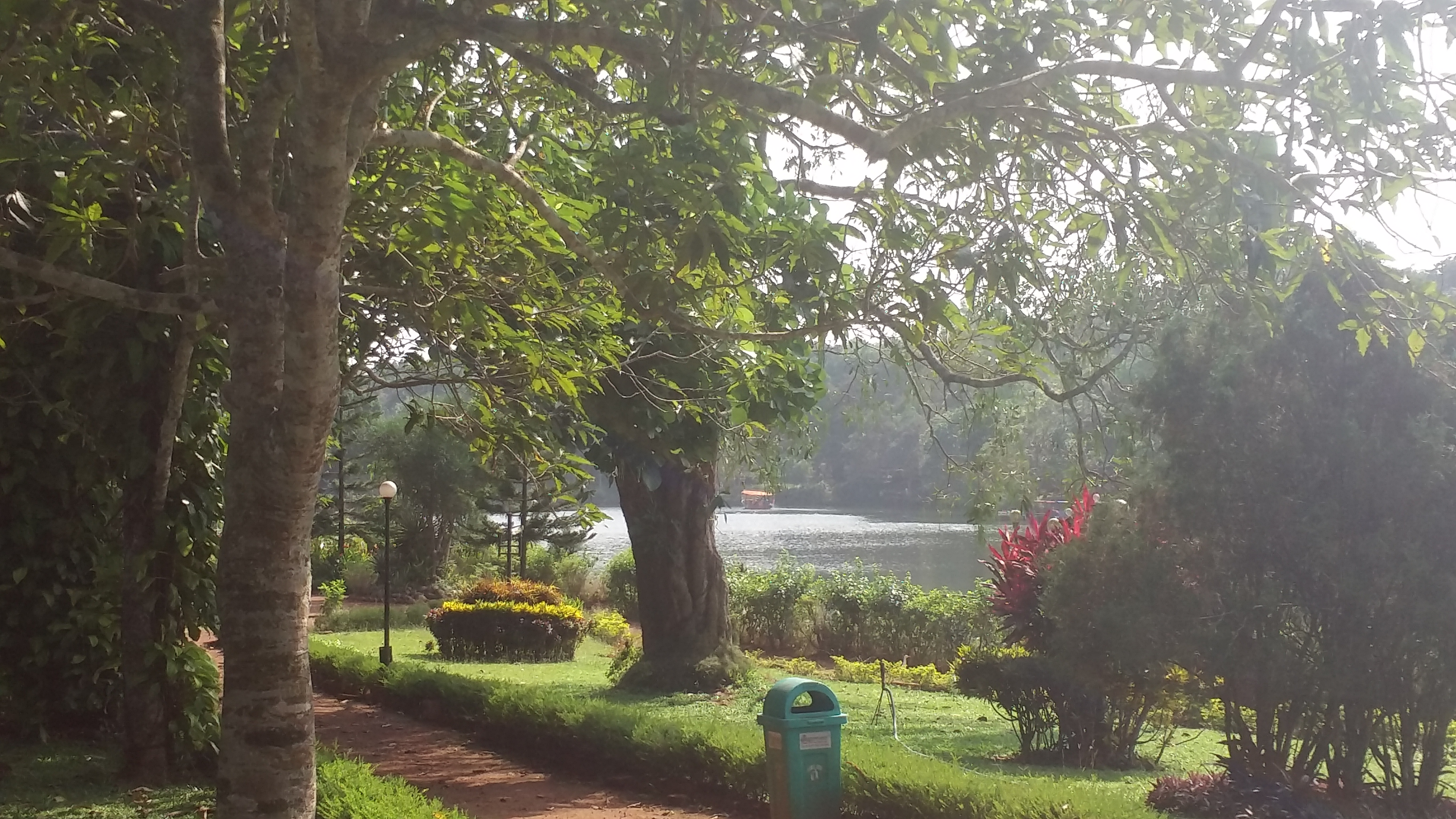
- Pilikula Botanical Garden

- Location at Mangaluru
- Coordinates: 12°50′43.2″N 74°52′44.5″E
- Country: India
- State: Karnataka
- District: Dakshina Kannada
- City: Mangaluru
- Founded: 1996

Pilikula Nisargadhama (or Nisarga Dhama) is a multi-purpose tourist attraction, at Vamanjoor, eastern part of Mangaluru city in Karnataka, managed by the District Administration of Dakshina Kannada. It is a major tourist attraction of Mangalore. It attracts large number of tourists due to the availability of multiple facilities.

In November 2026, the transfer of the park's management to the Karnataka Zoo Authority was reported to be in its final stage, with an agreement expected to be signed shortly, according to Forest and Environment Minister Ramalinga Reddy.

== Etymology ==
In the Tulu language, "pili" means tiger and "kula" means lake. The name Tiger Lake is because tigers used to come to this lake to drink.

The state of Karnataka also has a nature preserve called Kaveri Nisargadhama, near Kushalnagar.

== Facilities ==
The Pilikula Nisarga Dhama Society has developed this area to offer scenic beauty and peace. Pilikula has a huge lake encircled by gardens. Swans and ducks swim in the lake and sometimes occupy the gardens. Boating facilities are available in the lake. Couples prefer pedal boats; larger parties use motor boats that carry 10 to 15 people.

=== Botanical Garden and Arboretum ===
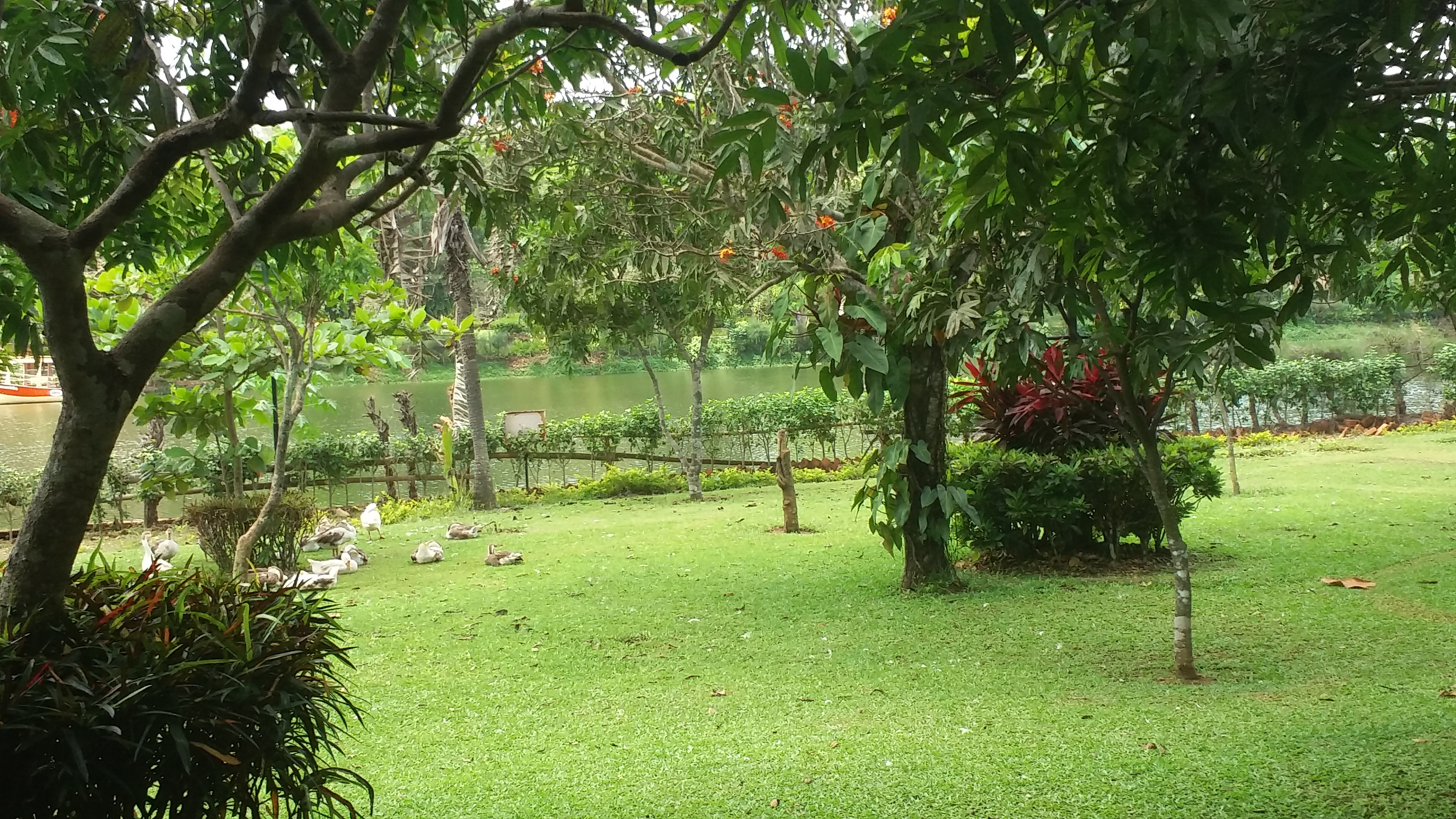
Pilikula Botanical Garden - Ducks taking rest

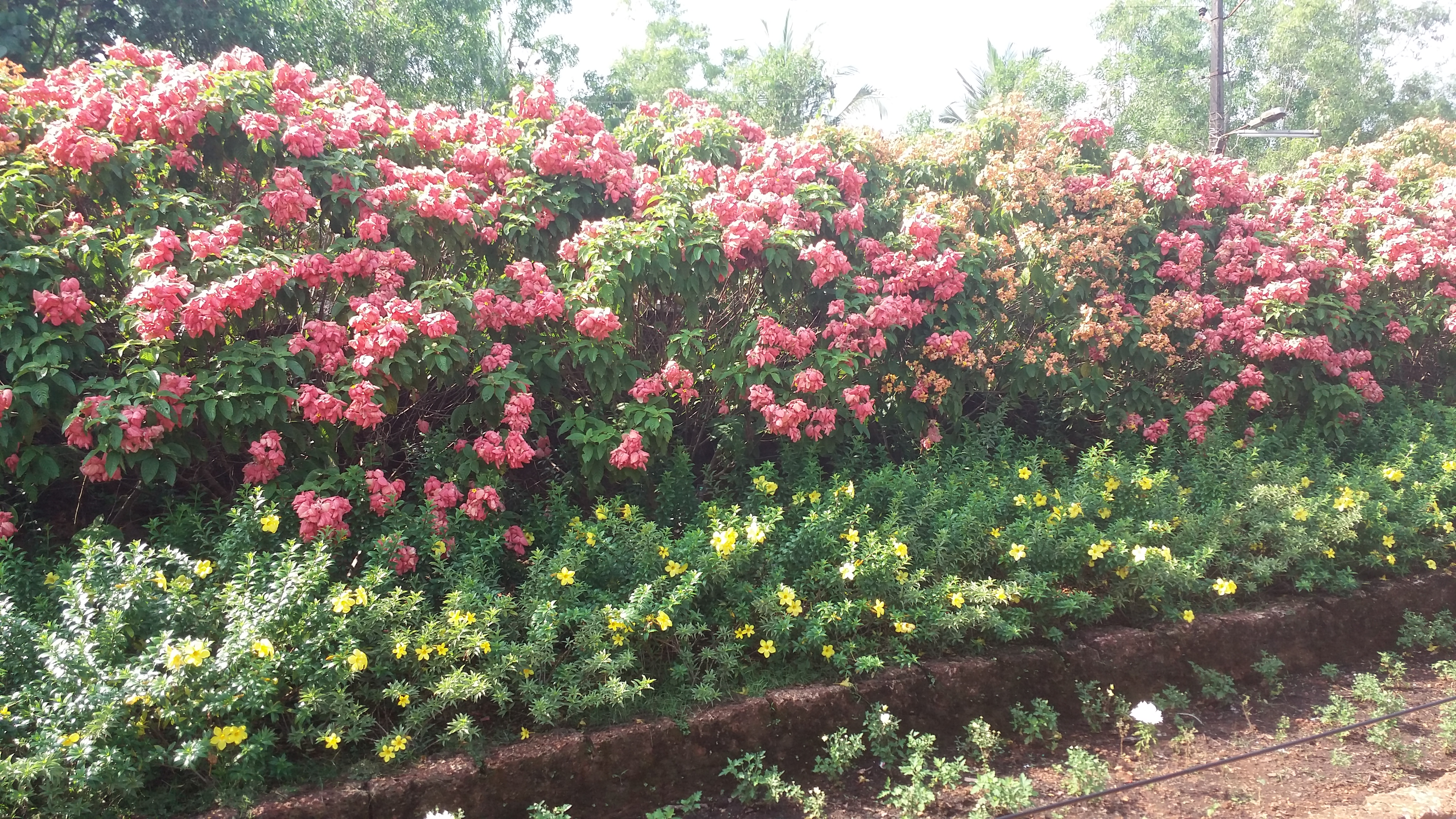
Pilikula Botanical Garden - Mussaenda trees near the entrance

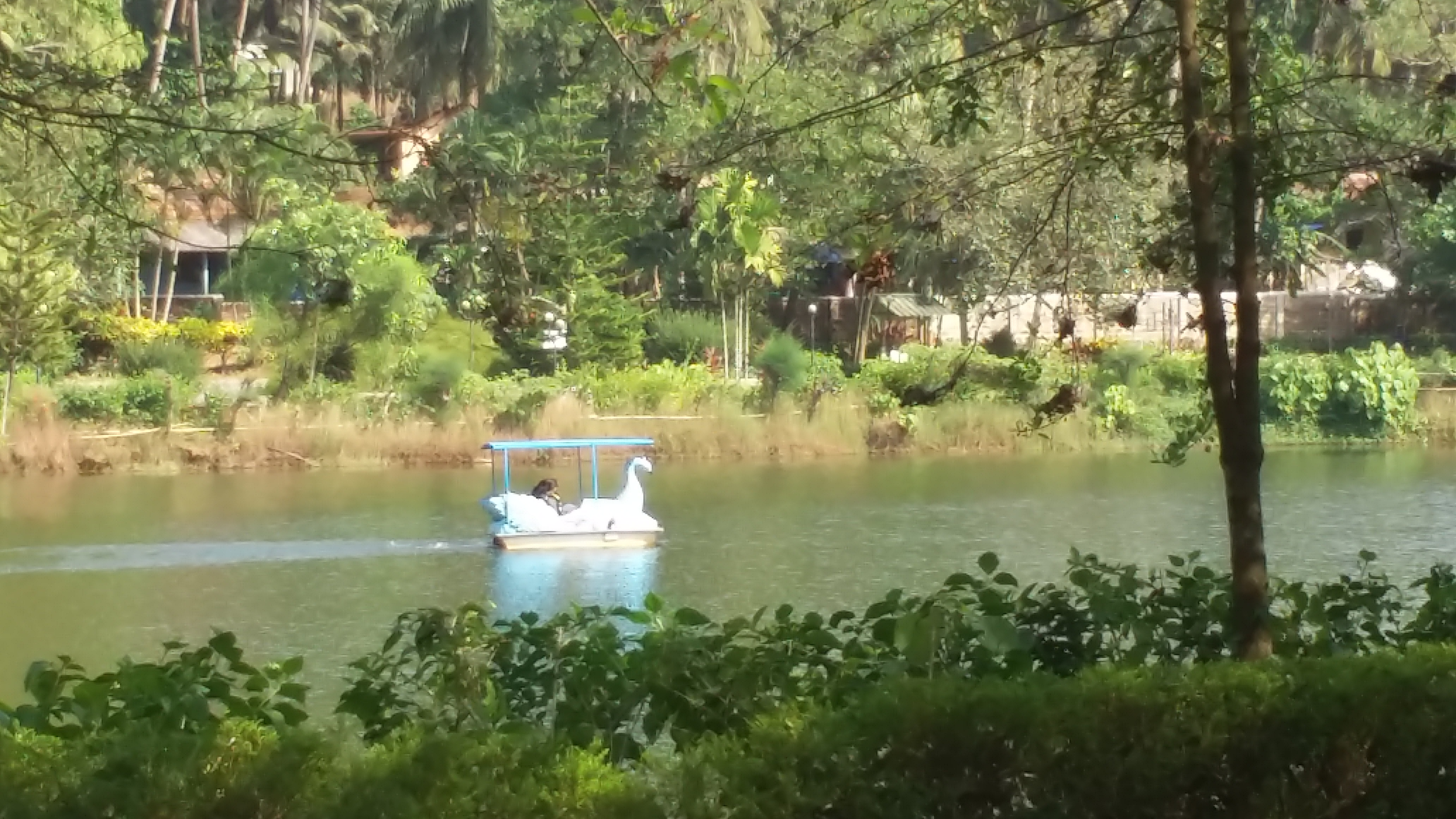
Pilikula Botanical Garden - Pedal Boat

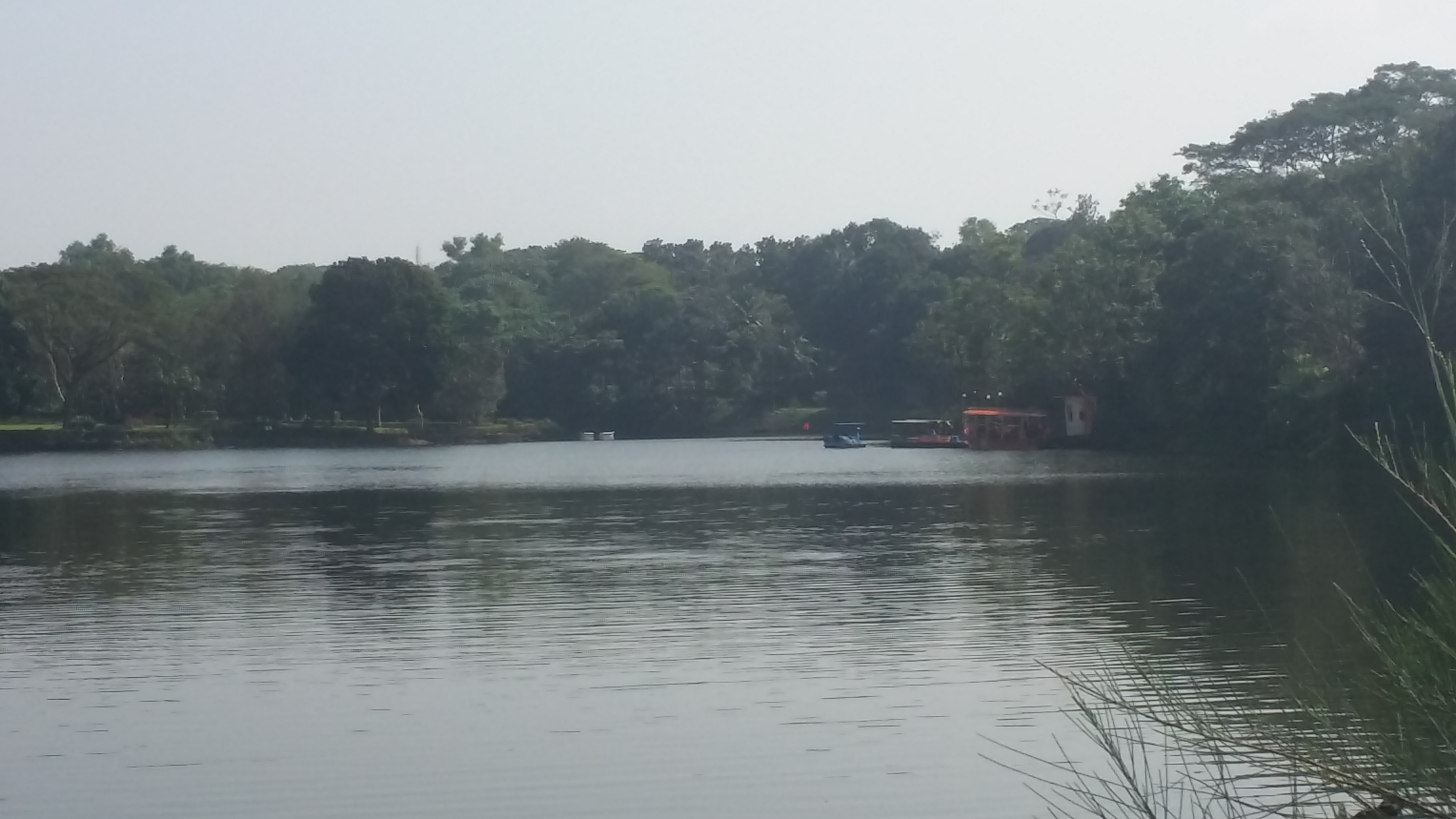
Pilikula Botanical Garden - Lake and Tree Cover

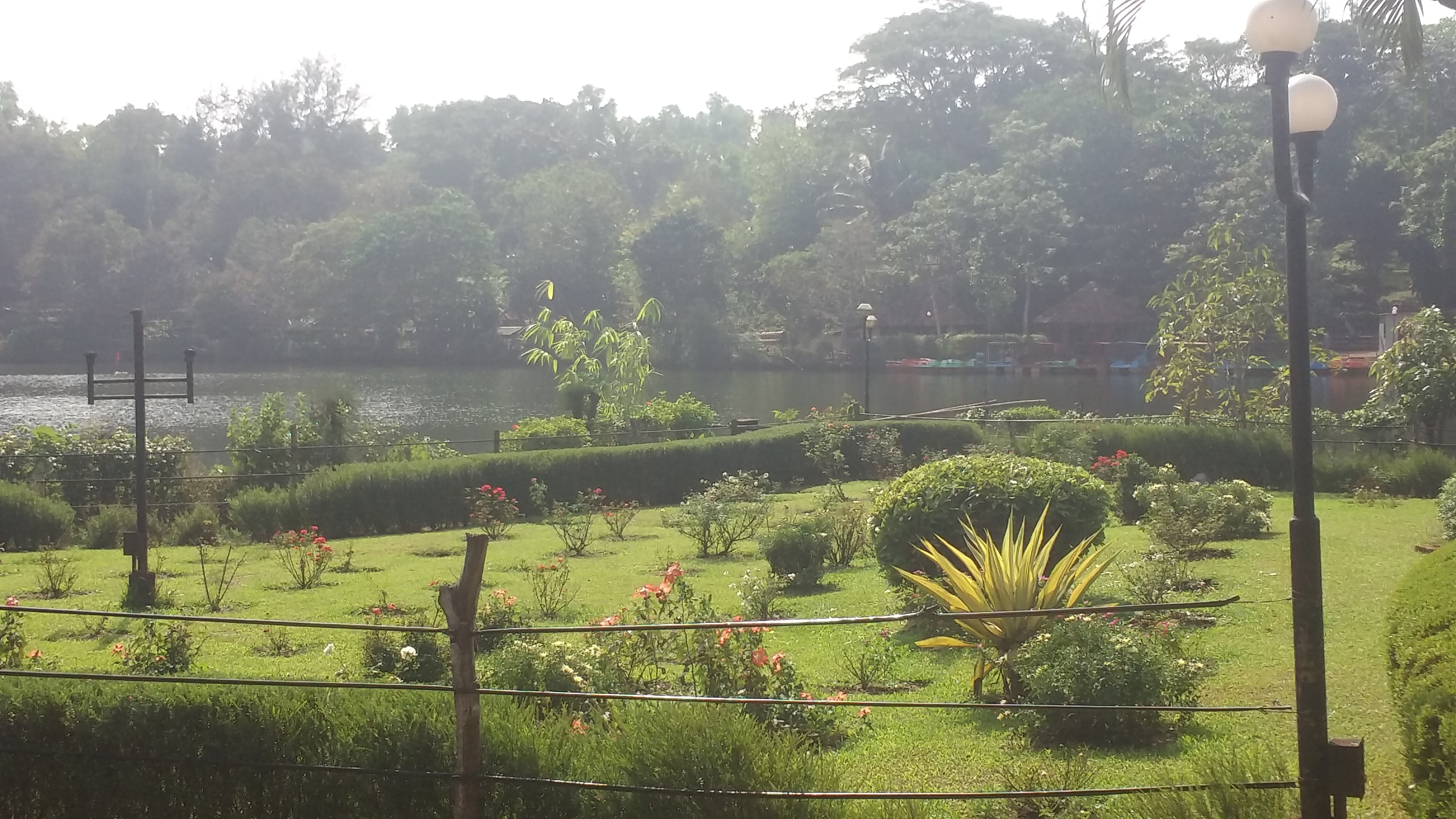
Pilikula Botanical Garden - Mini garden beside the lake

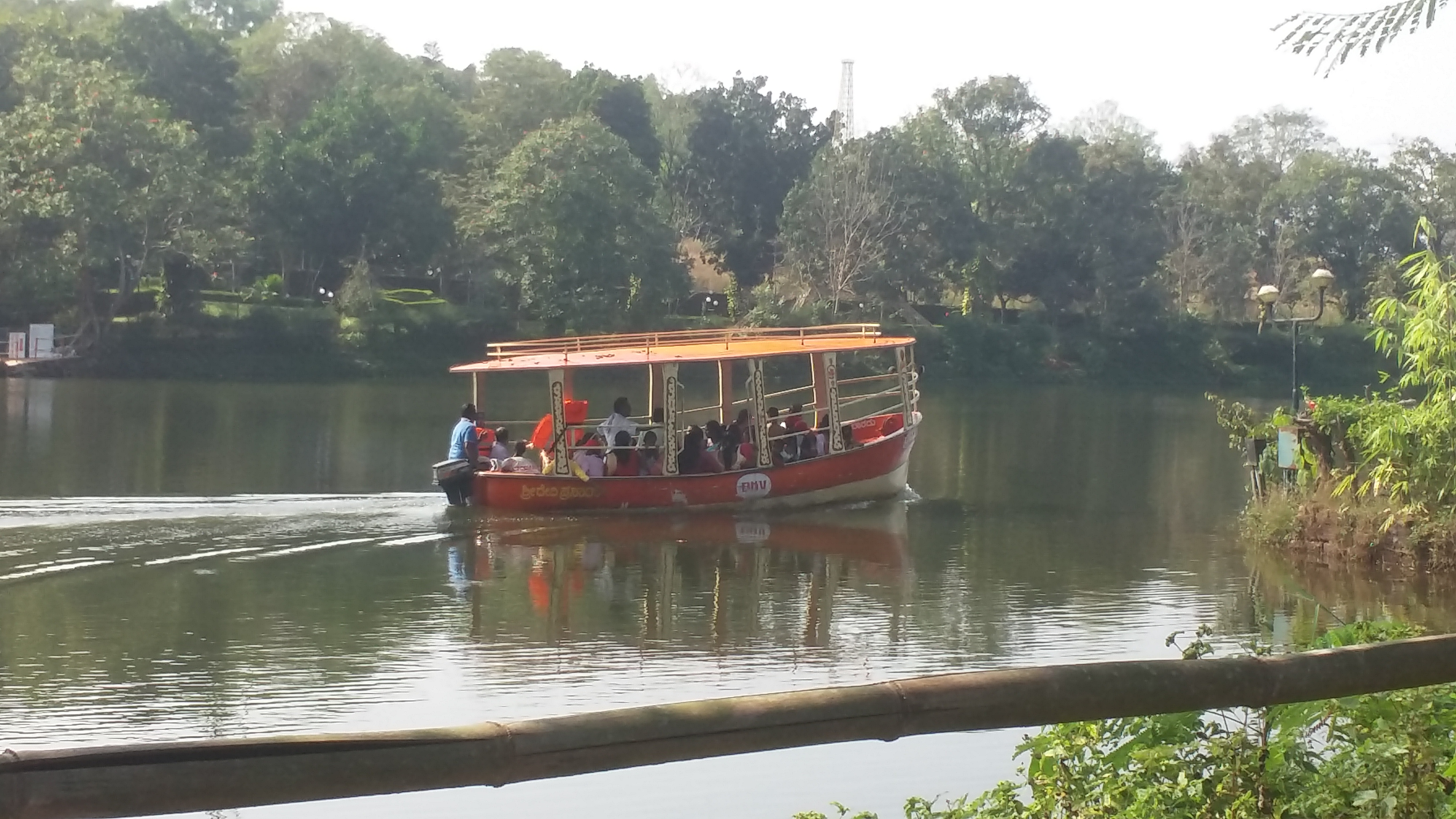
Pilikula Botanical Garden - Motor boat

The Pilikula Arboretum (Pilikula Botanical Garden) extends over 35 ha. About 60,000 seedlings belonging to 236 taxa of flowering plants of Western Ghats, spread over 60 families, have been planted randomly as well as family clusters. They include 70 taxa endemic to the Western Ghats region, whose conservation is the arboretum's focus. The arboretum contains not only threatened species but also a few species that had been considered extinct.

The arboretum also includes 6 acres devoted to medicinal plants with more than 460 varieties, often visited by students of botany and Ayurvedic medicine.

Nine aquatic ponds contain plants such as lotus and lilies.

=== Zoo and water park ===
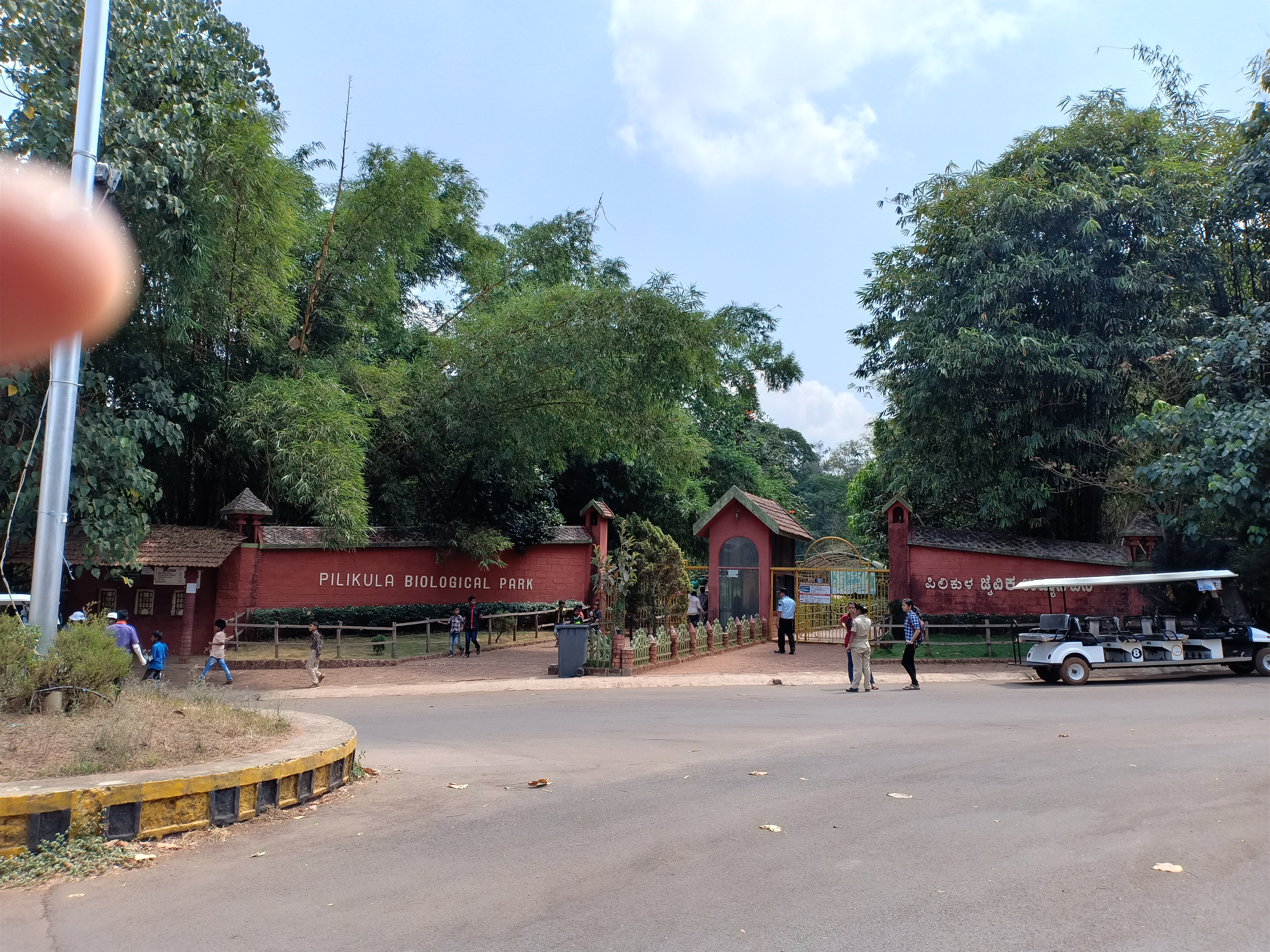
Near the entrance of the Pilikula Biological Park in Mangaluru

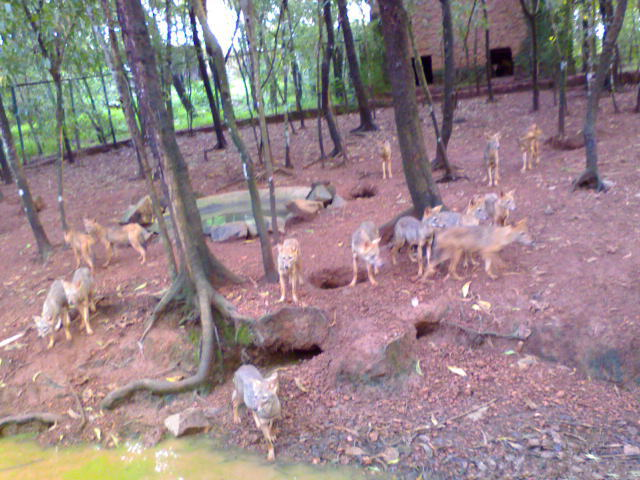
Dholes in the theme park

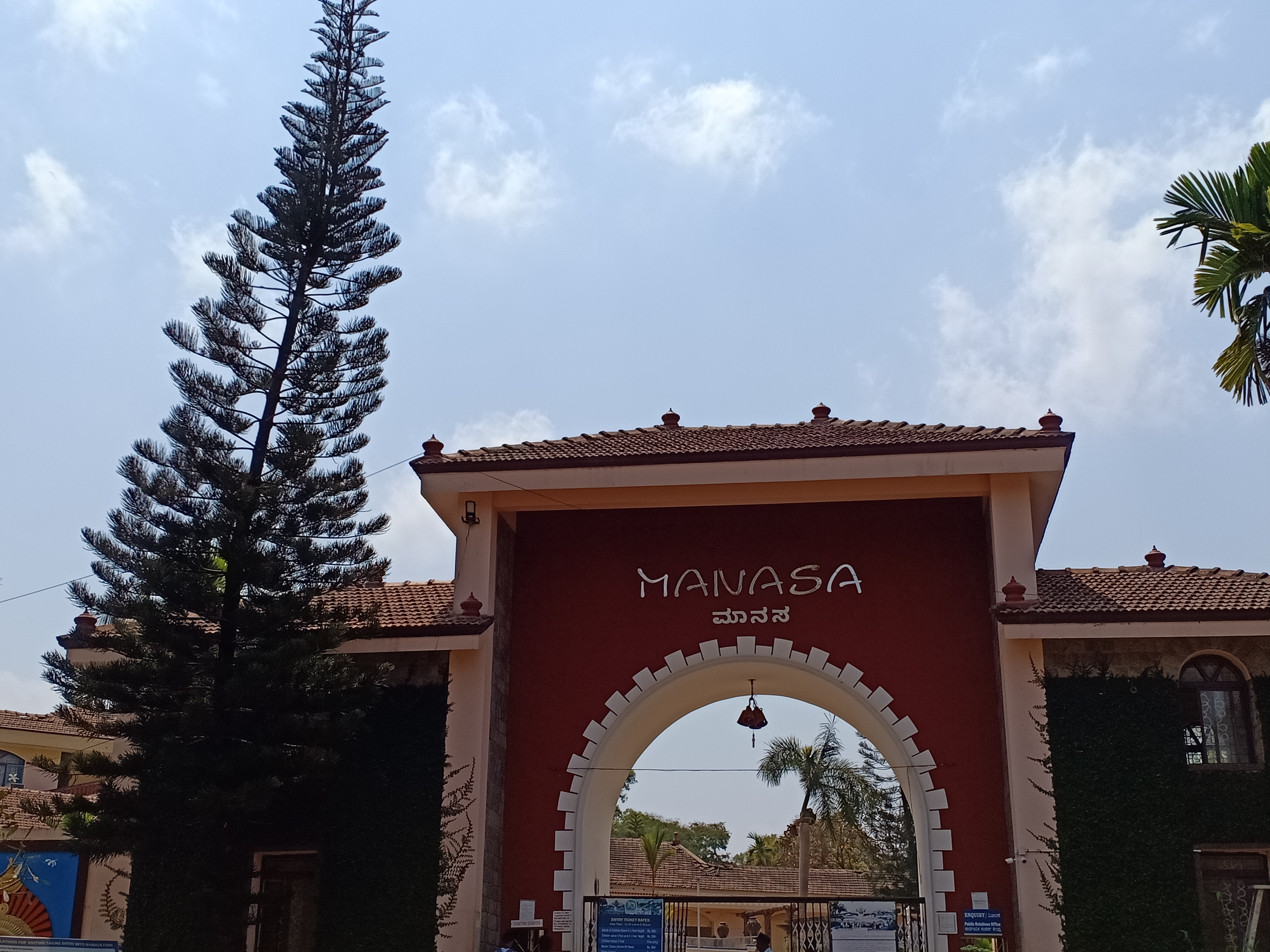
Entrance of the Manasa Water Park at Pilikula in Mangaluru

On the other side of the road, there is a zoo featuring several wild animals. The animals are not kept in cages but are in the open, with more natural barriers, such as wide trenches or wire mesh, to separate them from visitors. There are tigers, leopards, bears and other wild animals inside the park. There is also a variety of snakes and birds in the zoo.

Adjacent to the zoo is the Manasa Water Park, which is similar to the Water Kingdom in Mumbai.

=== Science centre ===
Pilikula Regional Science Centre was inaugurated in October 2014, with an area of approximately 4000 square metres.

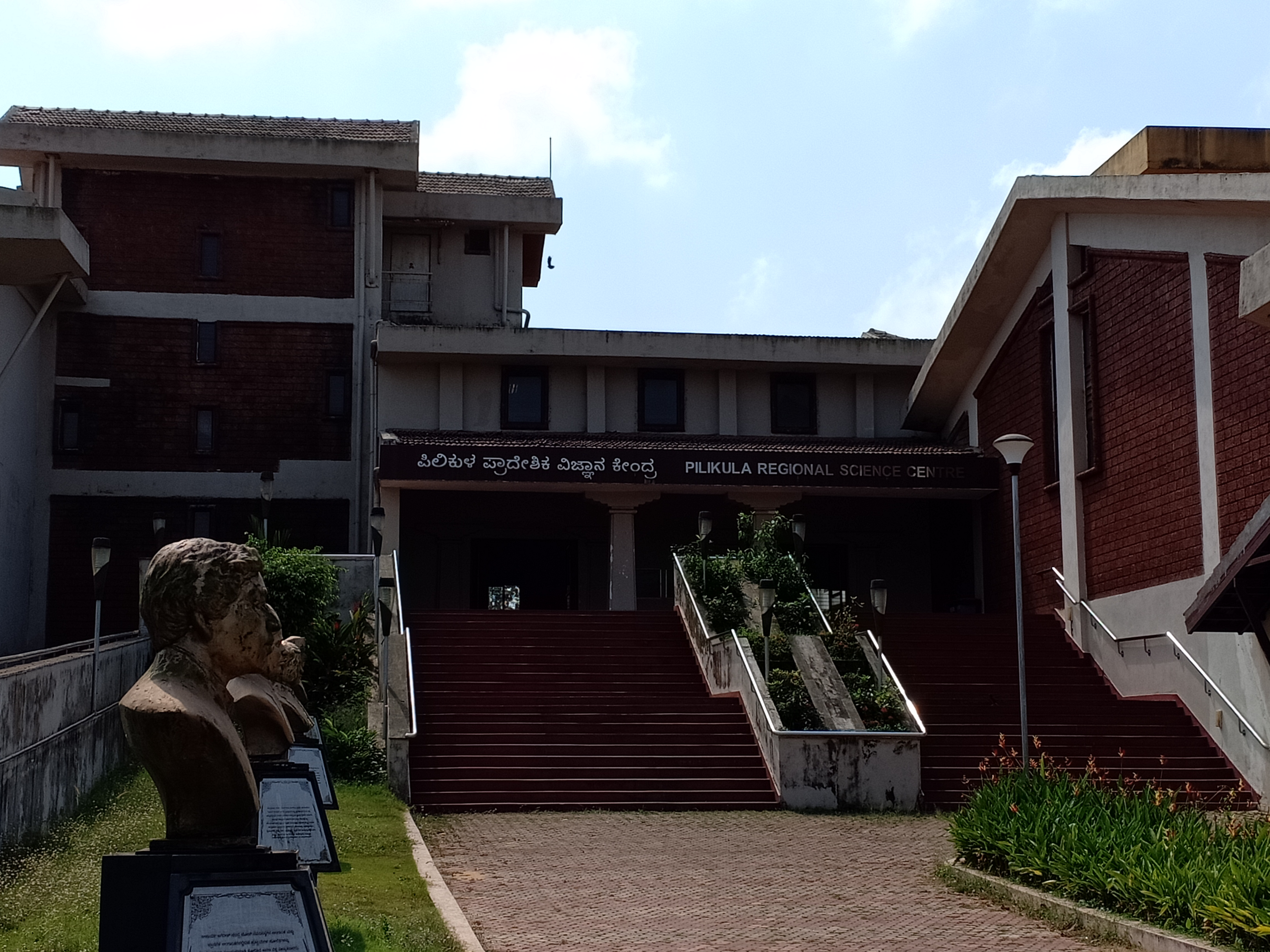

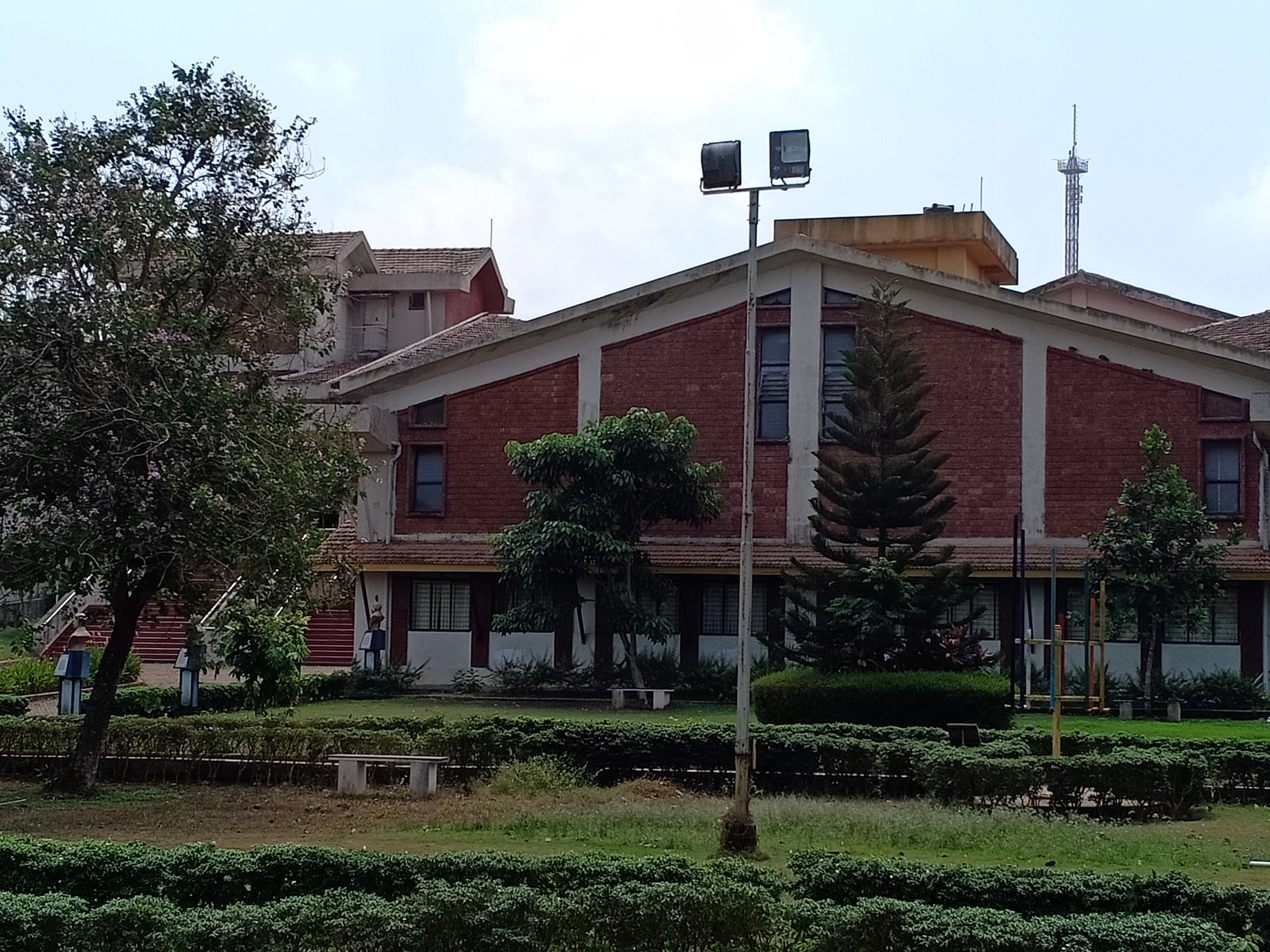

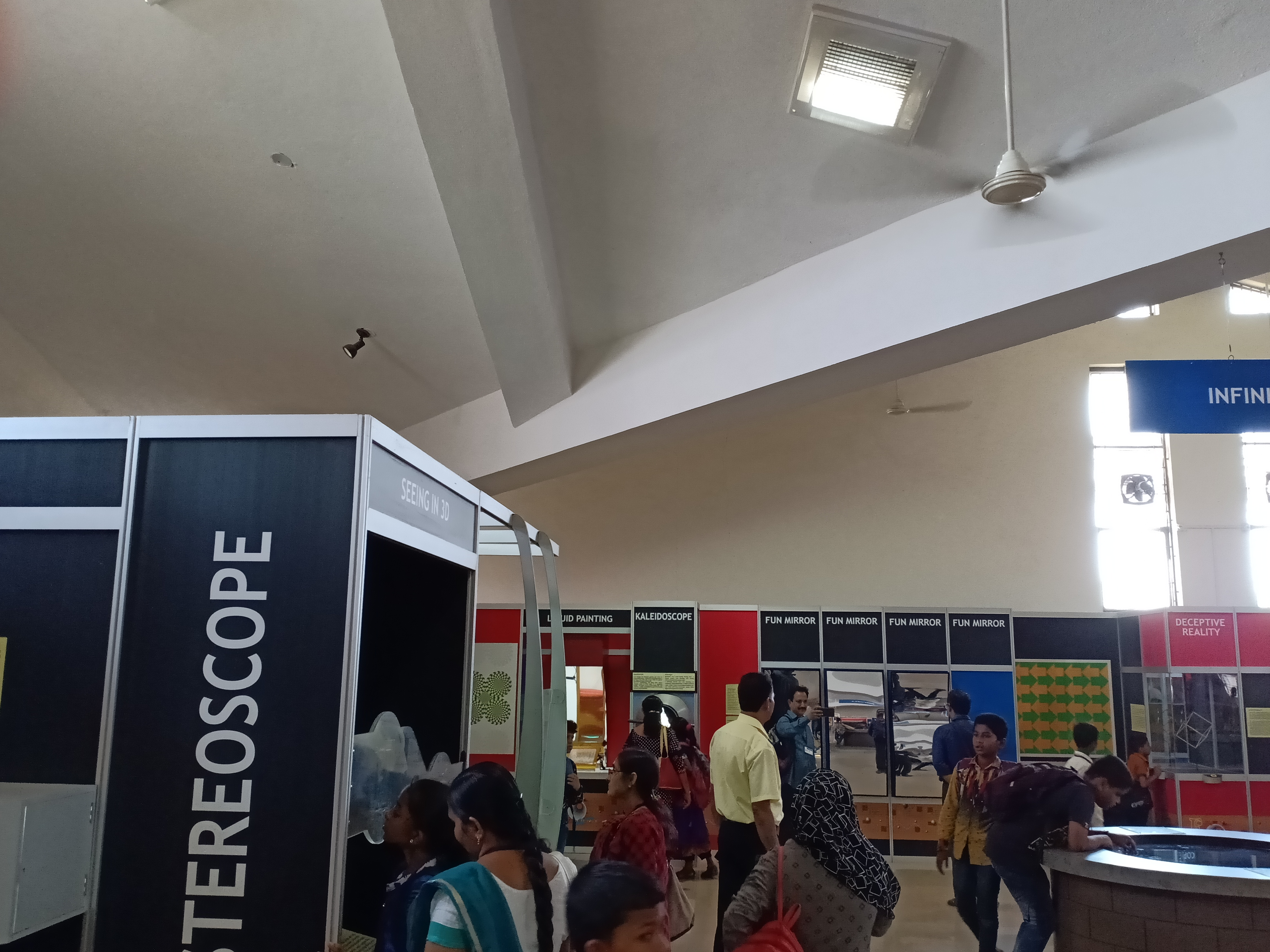

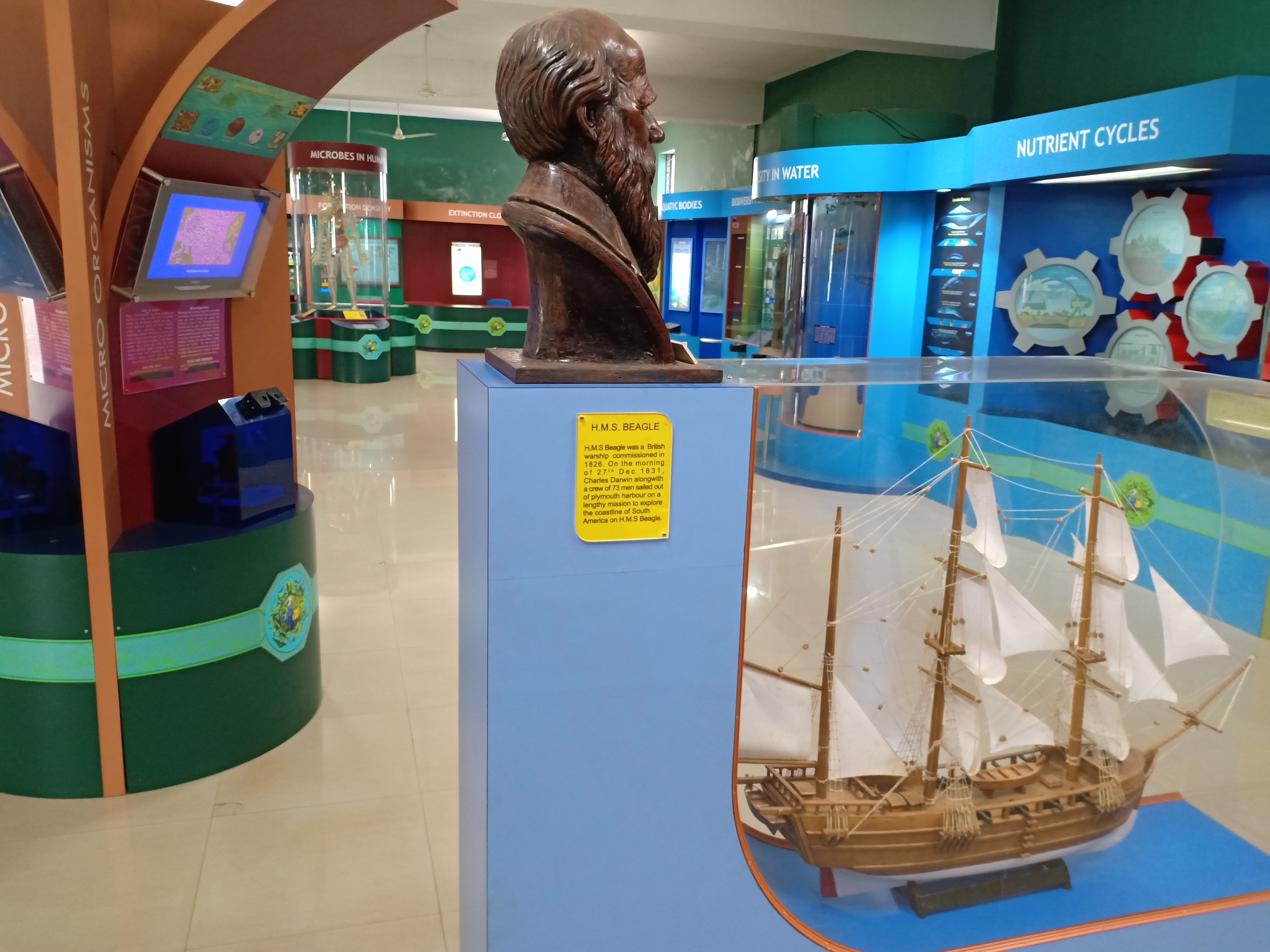

=== 3D Planetarium ===
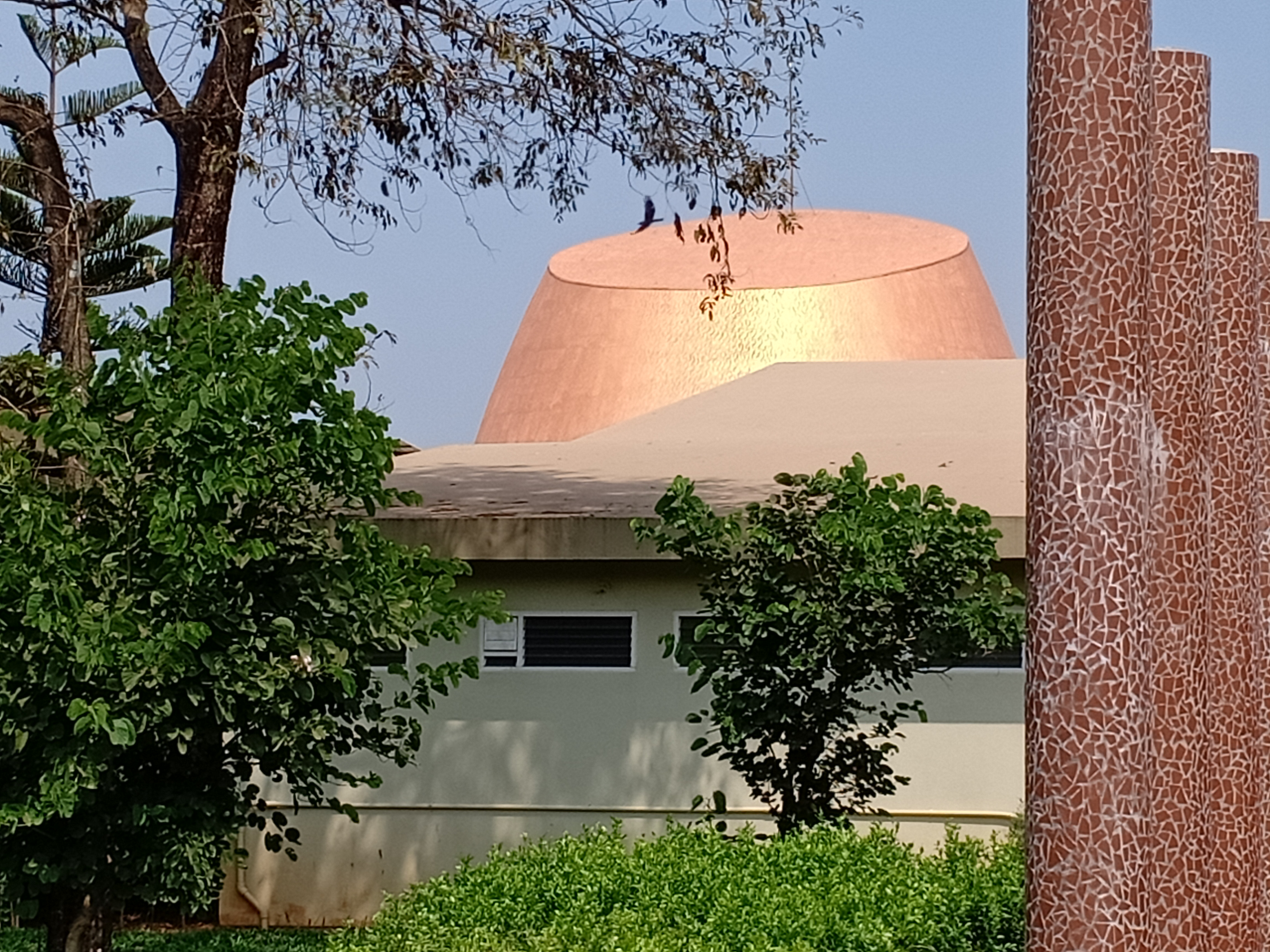
Dome of the Swami Vivekananda 3D Planetarium

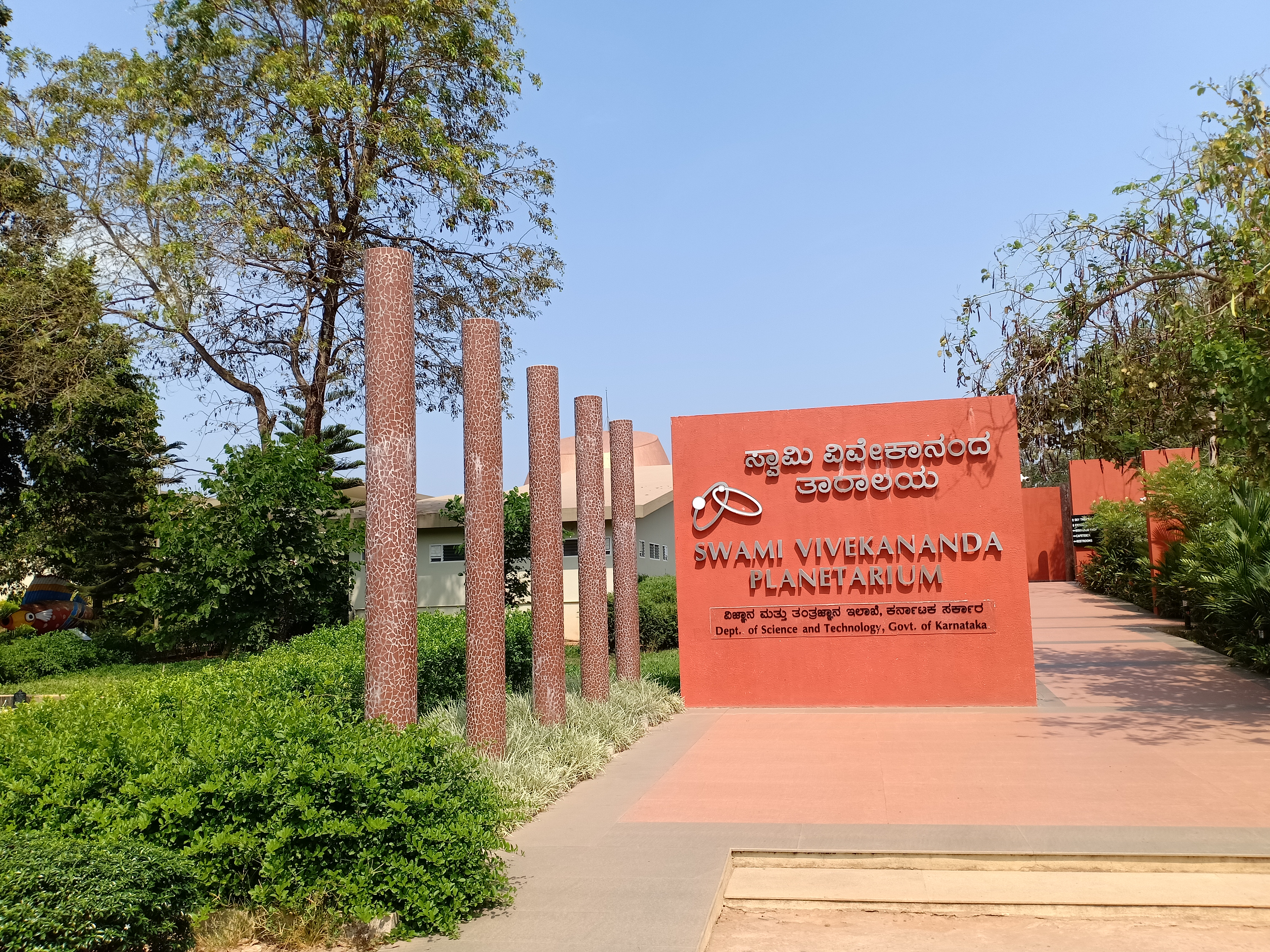
Entrance to Swami Vivekananda Planetarium

Swami Vivekananda Planetarium situated in Pilikula is the 1st and the only 3D Planetarium in India.

=== Golf course ===
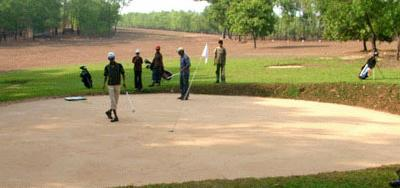
Pilikula Golf Course

The Pilikula Golf Course is an 18-hole golf course set in an area of 50 acres (20 ha) comprising nine fairways and nine greens, with a total of about 3,131 yards (2,863 m) through hilly terrain. Mid-day weather can be problematic but serious golfers play through it. Popular times of tee-off are usually early in the morning (6:30), and in the evenings after 4:00.

The annual Pilikula Challenge Cup attracts more than 150 golfers from Coorg, Mysore, Chikmagalur, and Bengaluru.

The club has over 500 members. A clubhouse inaugurated in December 2010 has 7 rooms, a restaurant, and a bar.

=== Heritage village ===
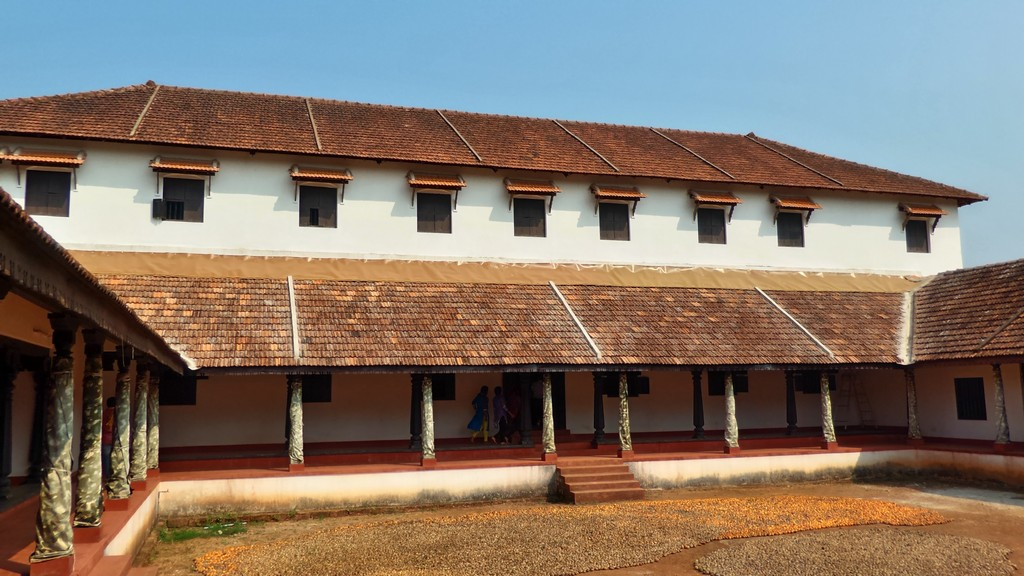

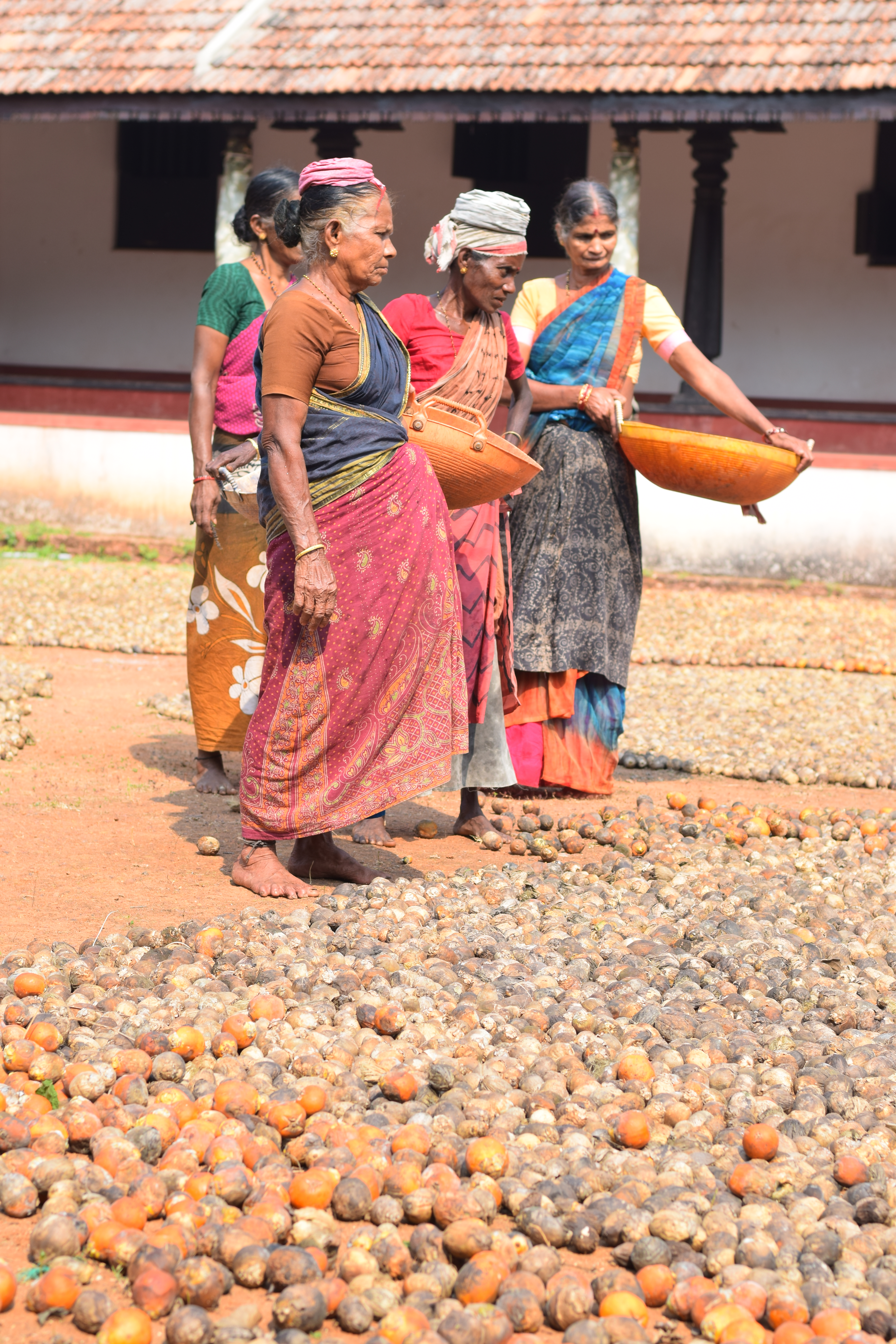

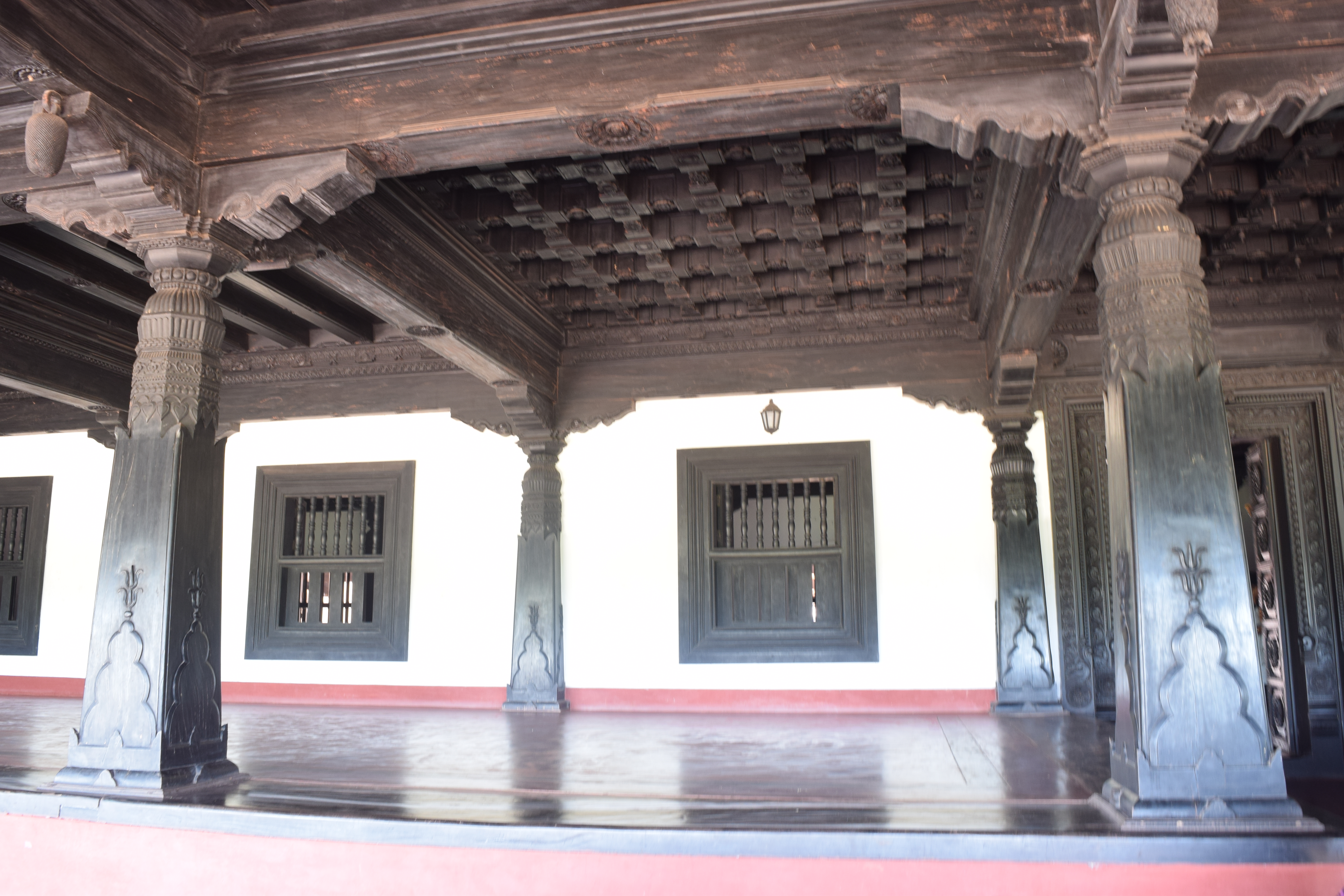

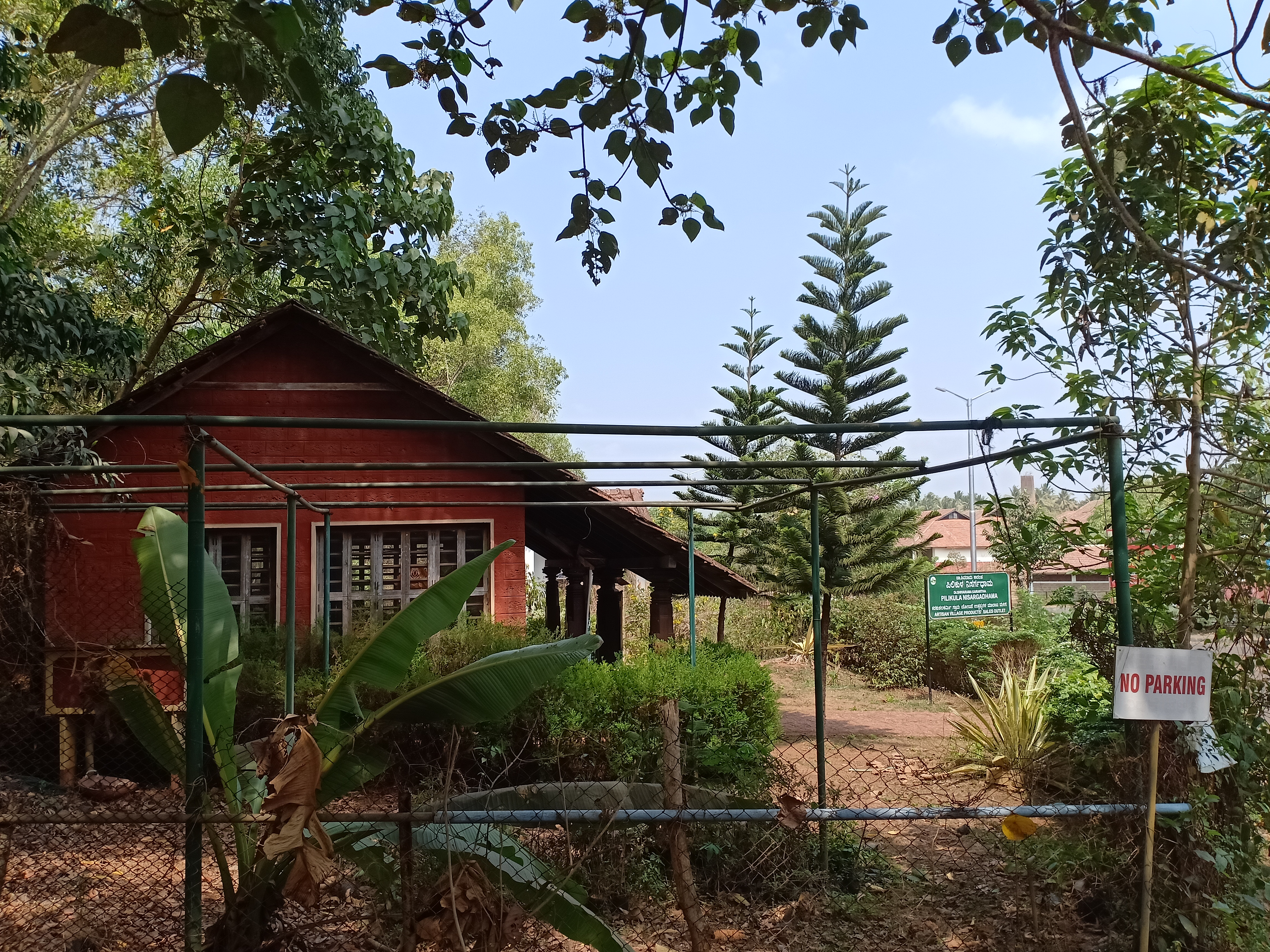
Pilikula Artisan Village - products sales house

Tulunadu culture is displayed here. Ancient house exhibiting various ancient Tulunad traditions, culture, dance forms, pottery, handicrafts, cuisine etc.

== Climate ==
Mangaluru has a tropical monsoon climate and is under the direct influence of the Arabian Sea branch of the southwest monsoon.

== See also ==
- Mahatma Gandhi Road (Mangalore)
- K S Rao Road
- NITK Beach
- Panambur Beach
- Tannirbhavi Beach
- Ullal beach
- Someshwar Beach
- Sasihithlu Beach
- Kadri Park
- Tagore Park
- St. Aloysius Chapel
- Bejai Museum
- Aloyseum
