= Magale =

2023 Indian film

- Directed by: Somu Kengeri
- Written by: Somu Kengeri
- Produced by: ZED NET COMMUNICATIONS PVT LTD (Producer) Mackin (Japan) (Co-producer) Sayuri (Japan) (Co-producer) A B Muralidharan(A B M) (Co-producer)
- Starring: Supritha Raj Guru Raj Shetty Bindu Raxidi Bishan Shetty Greeshma Shridhar Naveen Kumar
- Cinematography: Re Nu Som Jamadar
- Edited by: BS Kemparaju
- Music by: A B Muralidharan(A B M)
- Production company: ZED NET COMMUNICATIONS PVT LTD
- Release date: 21 April 2023
- Country: India
- Language: Kannada

Magale is a 2023 Indian Kannada-language Neo-Noir film written and directed by Somu Kengeri, and produced under the banner ZED NET COMMUNICATIONS PVT LTD. It stars Supritha Raj, Guru Raj Shetty, Bindu Raxidi, Bishan Shetty, Greeshma Shridhar, and Naveen Kumar. A B Muralidharan(ABM) composed the soundtrack and background score, while the cinematography is done by Re Nu Som Jamadar .

Magale was released on 21 April 2023 in Kannada, The film received mixed reviews from critics.

== Plot ==
Aadhya (Supritharaj), a high-school student is highly attached to her father-Subbu(Gururaj Shetty) for everything. Their love for each other is strong. Subbu's wife Geetha(Bindu Raxidi) wanted to marry Sudarshan(Bishan Shetty) in her youth but married Subbu and hence doesn't like both Subbu and Aadhya. Her uncaring nature for both is observed by Aadhya and she too doesn't have any love for her Mom. Problems arise when her Mom realizes her mistake and tries to get back to both Father and Daughter.

Subbu and Geetha patch up with each other, however Aadhya cannot accept her Mom. Things get ugly when Aadhya notices that her Father has accepted Geetha. Aadhya starts to feel possessive about her Dad and kills Geetha in a domestic fight when Subbu is not around and Subbu thinks he's responsible for the death. Both Father and Daughter bury the body and state to others that Geetha has left the house for her old lover Sudarshan.

Gangadhar (Naveen Kumar), friend of Sudarshan staying at same village hears the rumors of Geetha and informs it to Sudarshan .Problems complicate when Sudarshan comes to the village to find out truth about Geetha. Subbu on finding the truth about Geetha’s murder dies of heart attack. Sudarshan chooses to take care of Aadhya, but Aadhya on the other hand cannot come out of the loss of her father and eventually kills Sudarshan too revealing her possessiveness towards Father (Subbu) and her dark behavior.

Gangadhar gets to know that sudarshan went missing from a local police station and calls Aadhya to find out what to him. Aadhya while speaking to ganadhar cuts the calls and while crying she immediately laugh like a demon. And the screen play ends with the title "The play will start now.... Magale Part 2....", thus hinting a sequel

== Cast ==
- Supritha Raj as Aadhya, (daughter) and a high-school student
- Guru Raj Shetty as Subbu, father of Aadhya
- Bindu Raxidi as Geeta, mother of Aadhya
- Bishan Shetty as Sudarshan, ex-lover of Geetha and later care taker of Aadhya
- Naveen Kumar as (Gangadhar) Subbu / Sudarshan Friend
- Greeshma Shridhar

== Production ==
The films shooting started on 13 February 2022. The shooting continued at various location in and around Madikeri – Suntikoppa, Kodagarahalli, Kushal Nagara, Kambibaane, Maadapura

It was originally made for a digital release. Then the team decided to go for a theatrical release and were struggling to find funds, AB Muralidhar’s friends from Japan, Mackin and Sayuri, came on board as co-producers.

== Music ==
The music was composed by A B Muralidharan(A.B.M). The Audio rights were bought by Puneeth Rajkumar Audio known as PRK

=== Tracks ===
Sl.No	Title	Lyrics	Singer(s)	Length
1	Hodeya Doora Nee	Prashanth Gunuki	Rashmi Dharmendra	4:25
2	Prashanth	Gunuki	Kaushik Harsha	4.55
3	Prashanth	Gunuki	Meghana Bhat A B M	2:49

== Release ==
The film was released on 21 April 2023

== Reception ==
=== Critical Response ===
Harish Basavarajaiah of The Times of India gave 3.0 out of 5 stars and wrote "Fathers love their daughters more than their sons and many movies depict this. Magale, which, released this week, offers versatile content, Actors Gururaj Shetty and Bindu Raxidi have acted well. Child actress Supritha Raj shines in her role. However, the story lacks the pace to keep one hooked to the content. The songs do not attract much attention".

Ravi Rai of Udayavani wrote "A movie's run depends on how beautifully and convincingly you weave a simple story. In that regard, Magale, which opened this week, is a well-attempted movie. Magale is a movie that comes close to the audience, with a small budget, less characters, and clearly stating the point without any confusion."

== See also ==
- List of Kannada films of 2023
