= Hosakote, Kodagu =

Hosakote, Kodagu Hosakote
- village
- Location in Karnataka, India Hosakote, Kodagu (India)
- Coordinates: 12.4243000°N 75.867317°E
- Country: India
- State: Karnataka
- District: Kodagu
- Talukas: Kushalnagar

Government
  - Body: Village Panchayat

Languages
  - Official: Kannada
- Time zone: UTC+5:30 (IST)
- Nearest city: Kushalnagar
- Civic agency: Village Panchayat

Hosakote is a village in the southern state of Karnataka, India. It is located in the Kushalanagar taluk of Kodagu district in Karnataka.

== See also ==
- Kodagu
- Districts of Karnataka
- Mangalore
