= Kudumangalore =

- village
- Country: India
- State: Karnataka
- District: Kodagu
- Talukas: kushalnagar

Population (2001)
  - Total: 8,252

Languages
  - Official: Kannada
- Time zone: UTC+5:30 (IST)

Kudumangalore is a village in the southern state of Karnataka, India. It is located in the kushalnagar taluk of Kodagu district.

== Demographics ==
As of 2001 India census, Kudumangalore had a population of 8252 with 4209 males and 4043 females.

== See also ==
- Mangalore
- Kodagu
- Districts of Karnataka
