= Thorenoor =

- Village
- Location in Karnataka, India Thorenoor (India)
- Coordinates: 12.6404236°N 75.7797238°E
- Country: India
- State: Karnataka
- District: Kodagu

Government
  - Body: Gram panchayat

Languages
  - Official: Kannada
  - Other spoken: Hindi
- Time zone: UTC+5:30 (IST)
- ISO 3166 code: IN-KA

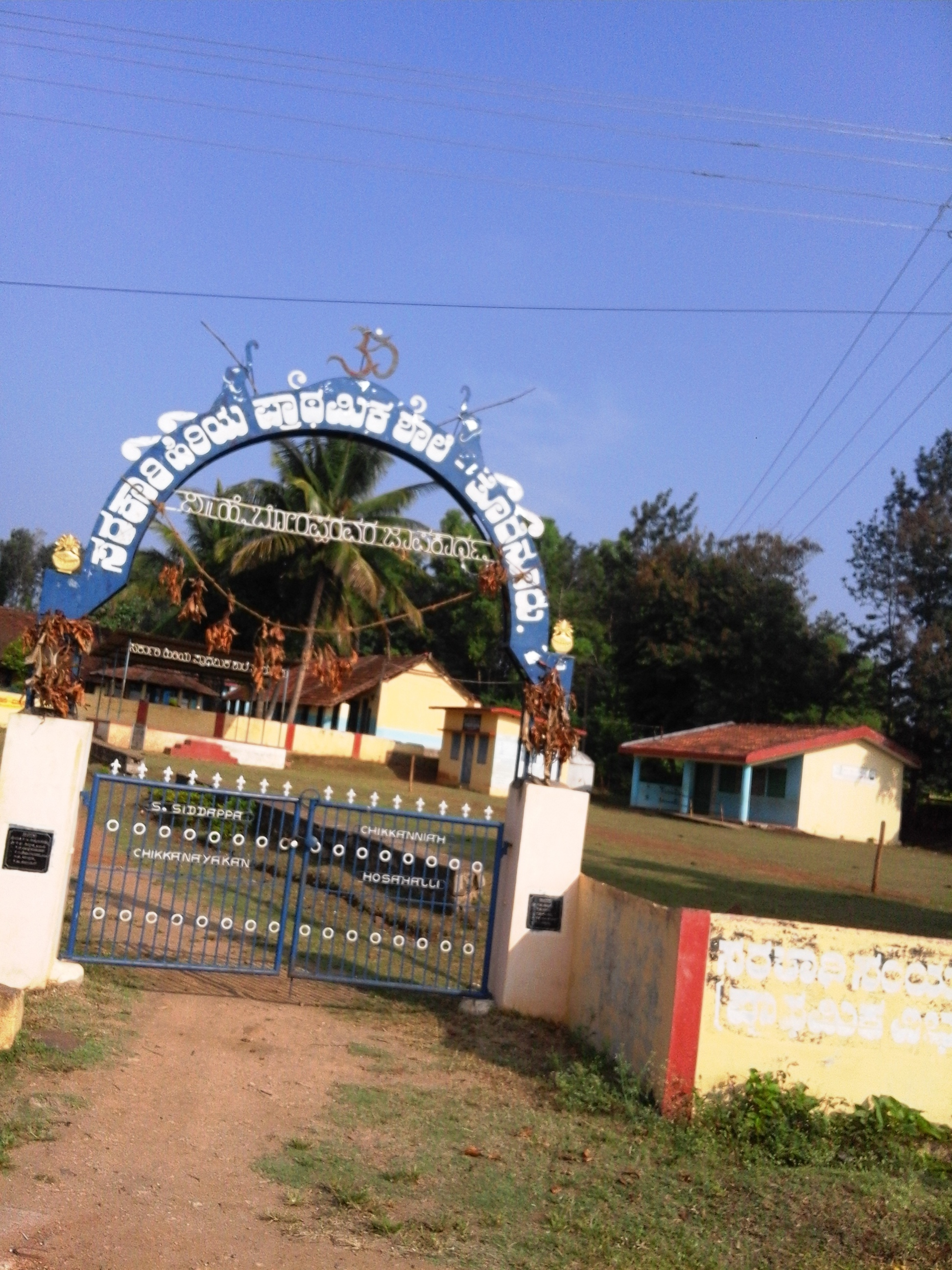
Thorenoor school

Thorenoor is a small village in Kodagu district of Karnataka state, India.

== Location ==
Thorenoor is located between Kushal Nagar and Hassan towns in Karnataka state.

== Administration ==
Thorenoor is administered as part of Somvarpet Taluk in Kodagu district.

== Burial Site ==
Scientists have discovered a megalithic burial site at Thorenoor. The discovery was made during a recent archaeological exploration conducted Prof T Murugeshi of the Department of Ancient History and archeology, MSRS College, Shirva.

== Educational Organizations ==
Government Higher Primary School, Thorenoor was established in 1920. The school has a library of 1,465 volumes. There are seven classrooms and seven teachers in the school.

== Image gallery ==
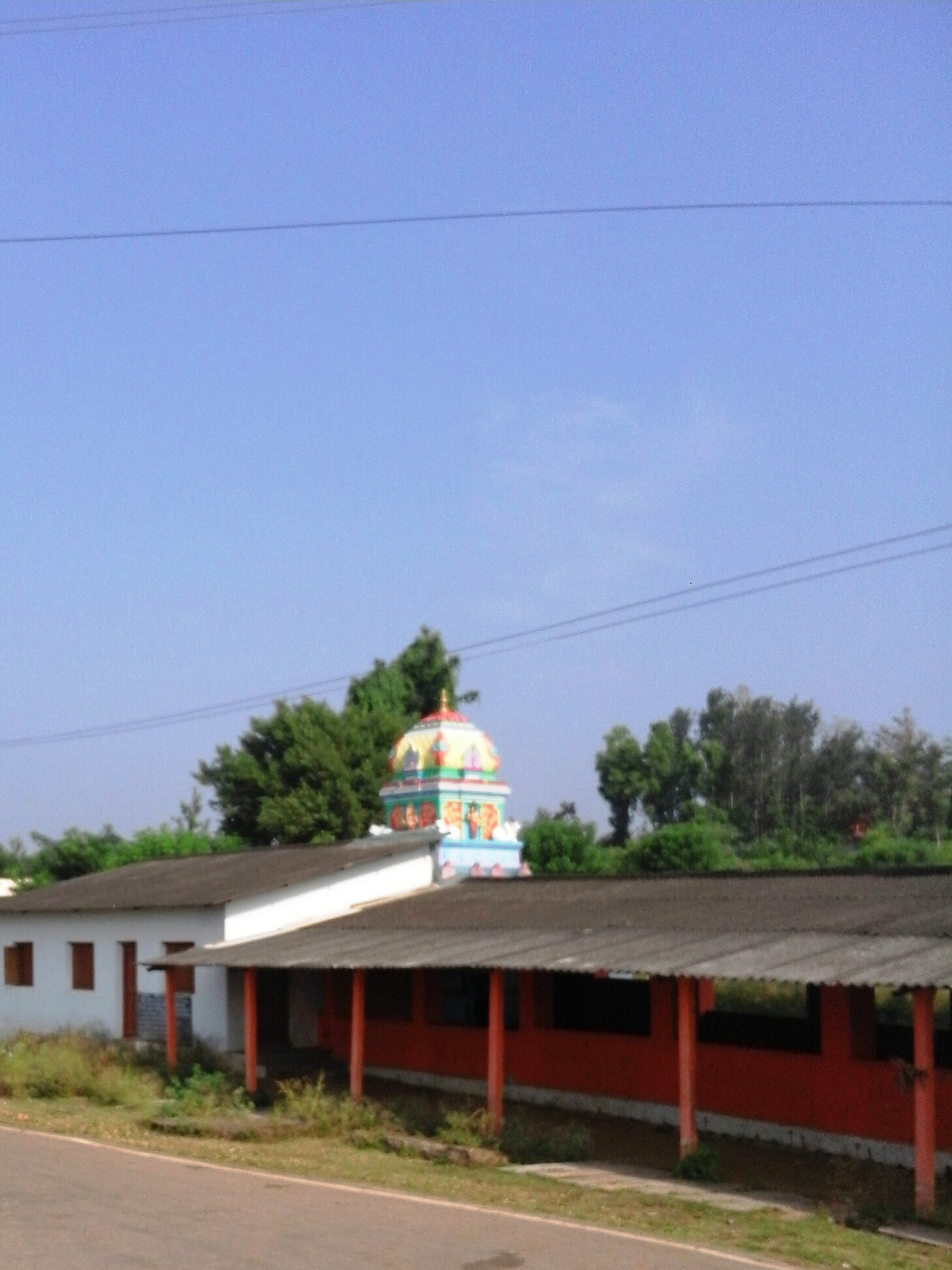
Thorenuru village

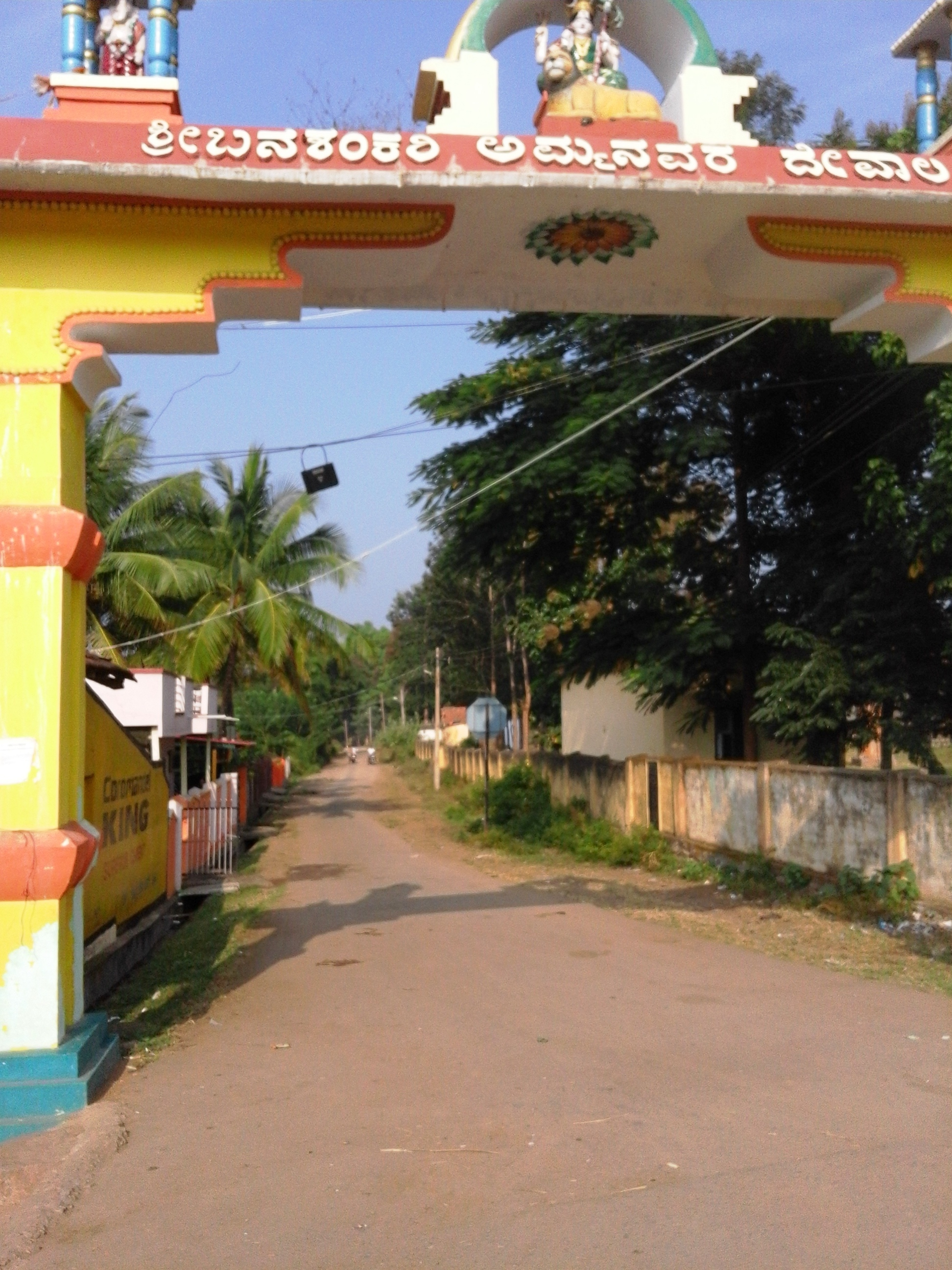
Hebbale

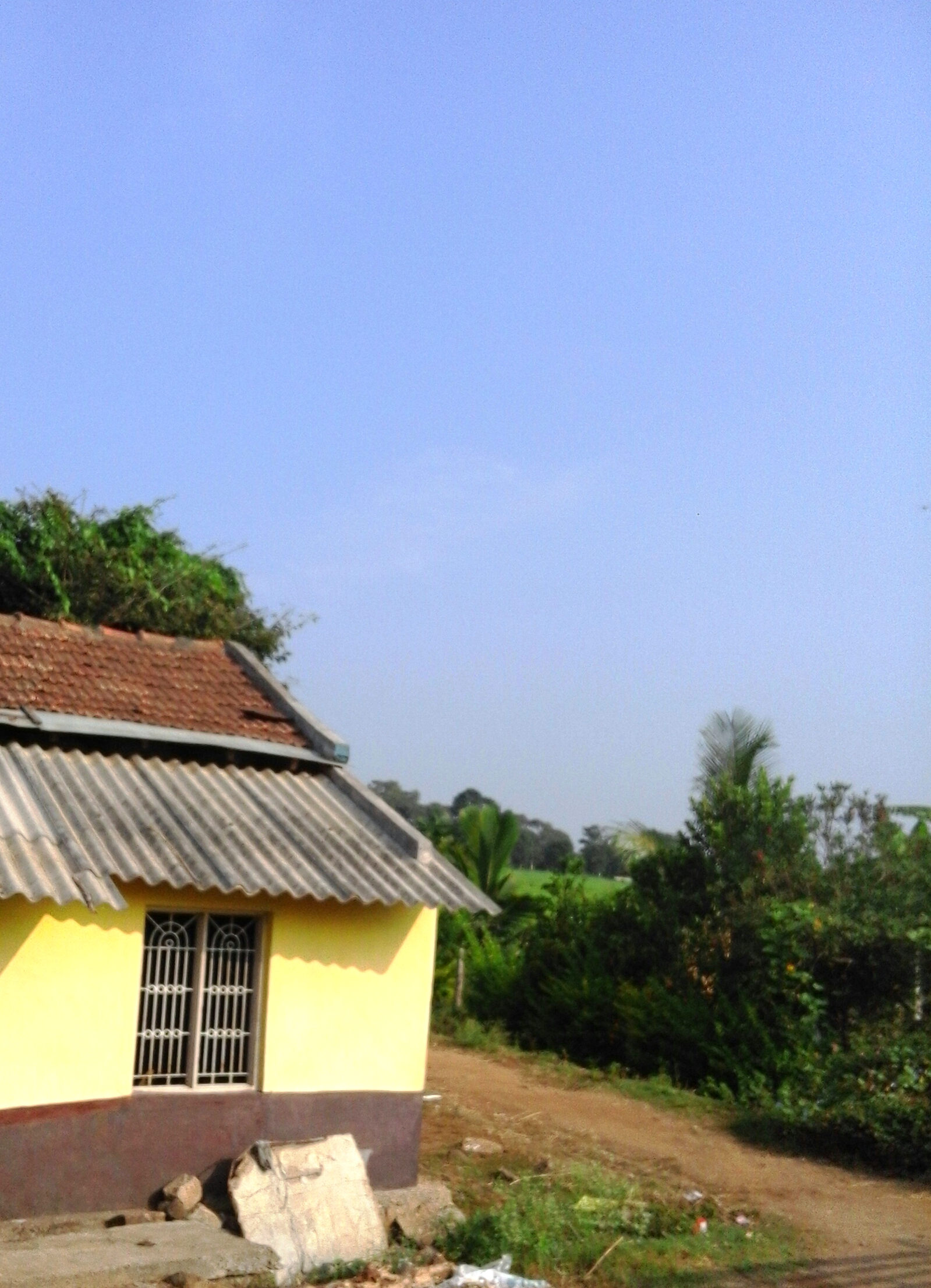
Hulase

== See also ==
- Madikeri
- Mangalore
- Somwarpet
