= Mullusoge =

- Village
- Country: India
- State: Karnataka
- District: Kodagu
- Talukas: Kushalanagar

Population (2001)
  - Total: 5,864

Languages
  - Official: Kannada
- Time zone: UTC+5:30 (IST)

Mullusoge is a village in the southern state of Karnataka, India. It is located in the Kushalanagar taluk of Kodagu district.

== Demographics ==
As of 2001 India census, Mullusoge had a population of 5,864, with 2,921 males and 2,943 females.

== See also ==
- Kodagu
- Mangalore
- Districts of Karnataka
