= Dubare =

Forest camp on the banks of the river Kaveri in Karnataka, India

Coordinates: 12.3685°N 75.9049°E

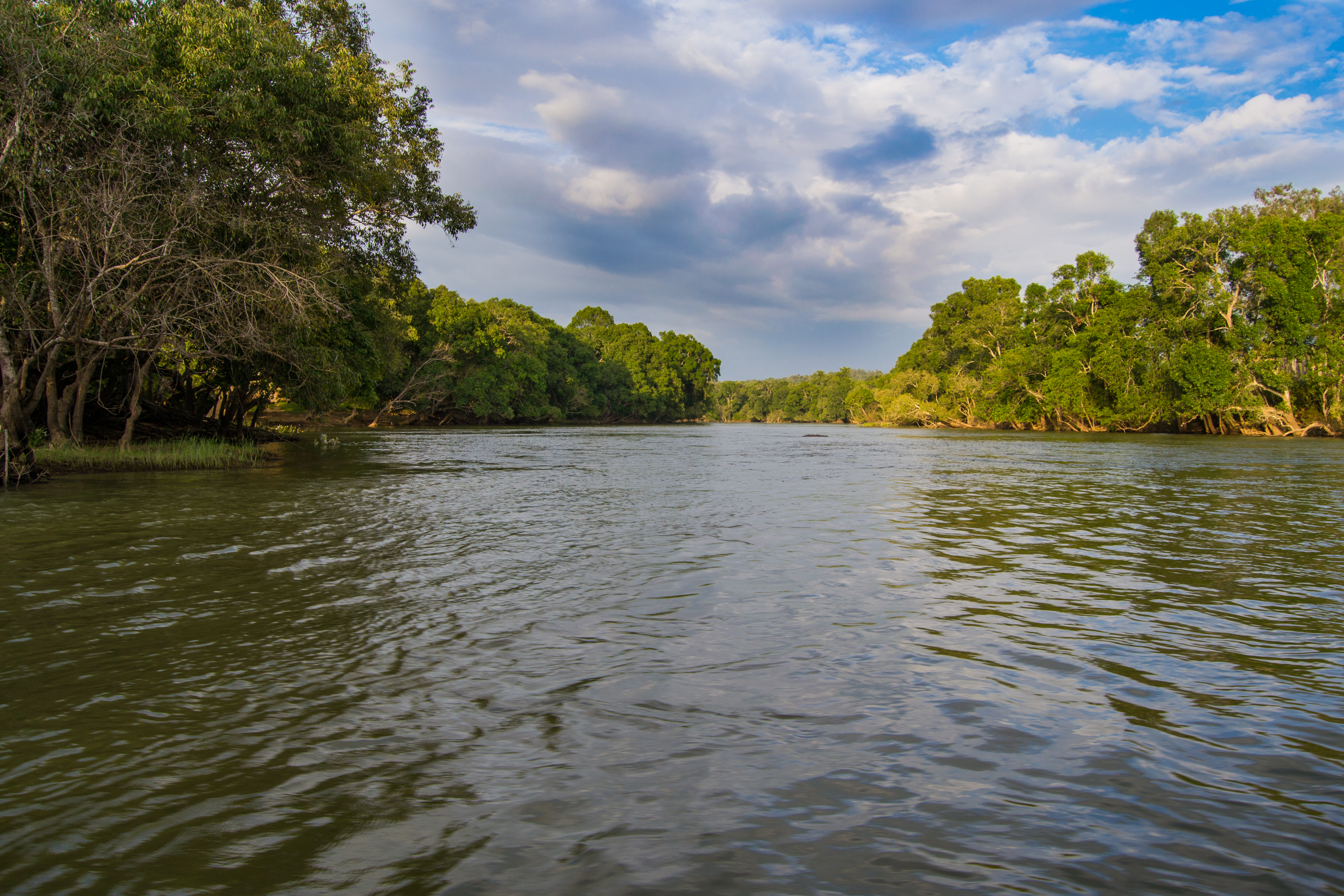
Kaveri by Dubare Forest

Dubare is a forest camp on the banks of the river Kaveri in the district of Kodagu, Karnataka.

== See also ==
- Suntikoppa
- Bylakuppe
- Kaveri Nisargadhama
- Kushalanagar
