= Nelliyahadikeri =

Nellihudikeri
- village
- Country: India
- State: Karnataka
- District: Kodagu
- Talukas: Kushalnagara

Population (2001)
  - Total: 6,291

Languages
  - Official: Kannada
- Time zone: UTC+5:30 (IST)
- Postal code: 571253

Nellihudikeri is a village in the southern state of Karnataka, India. It is located in the Kushalnagara taluk of Kodagu district.

== Demographics ==
As of 2001 India census, Nellihudikeri had a population of 6291 with 3123 males and 3168 females.

== See also ==
- Kodagu
- Mangalore
- Districts of Karnataka
