= Nisargadhama =

Island in the Kaveri River, India

Coordinates: 12°26′45″N 75°56′15″E

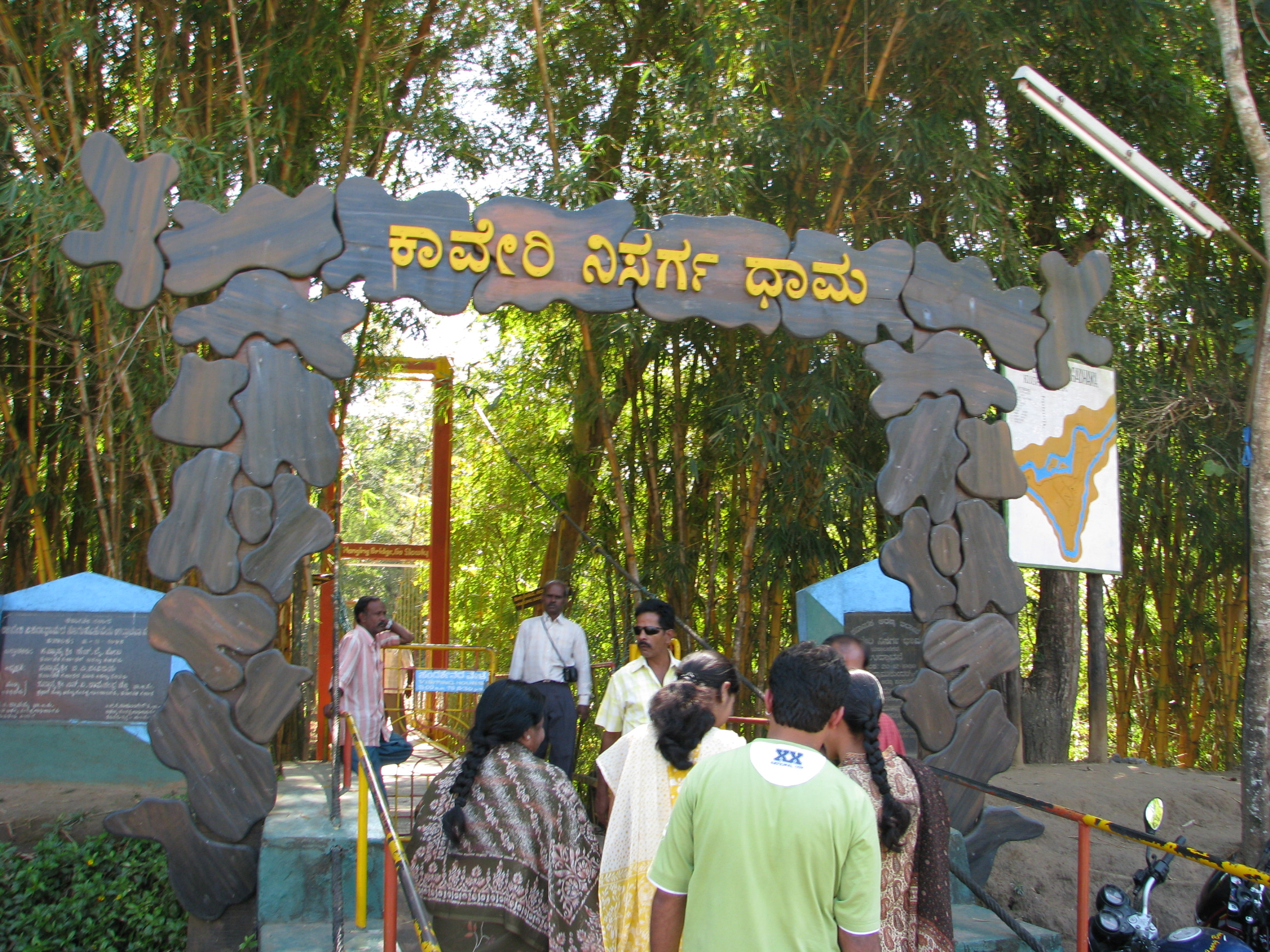
The Hanging Bridge

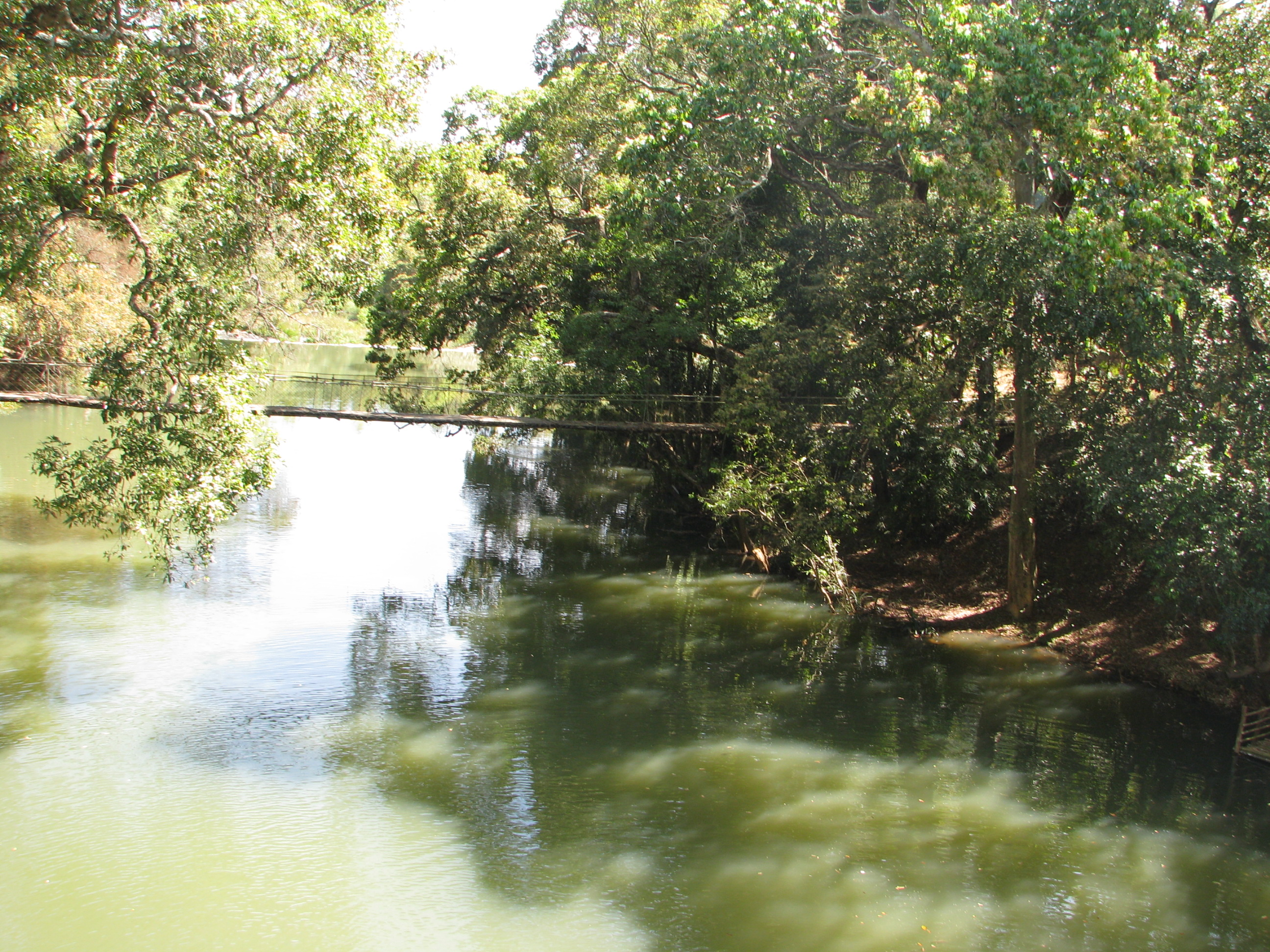
The Old bridge

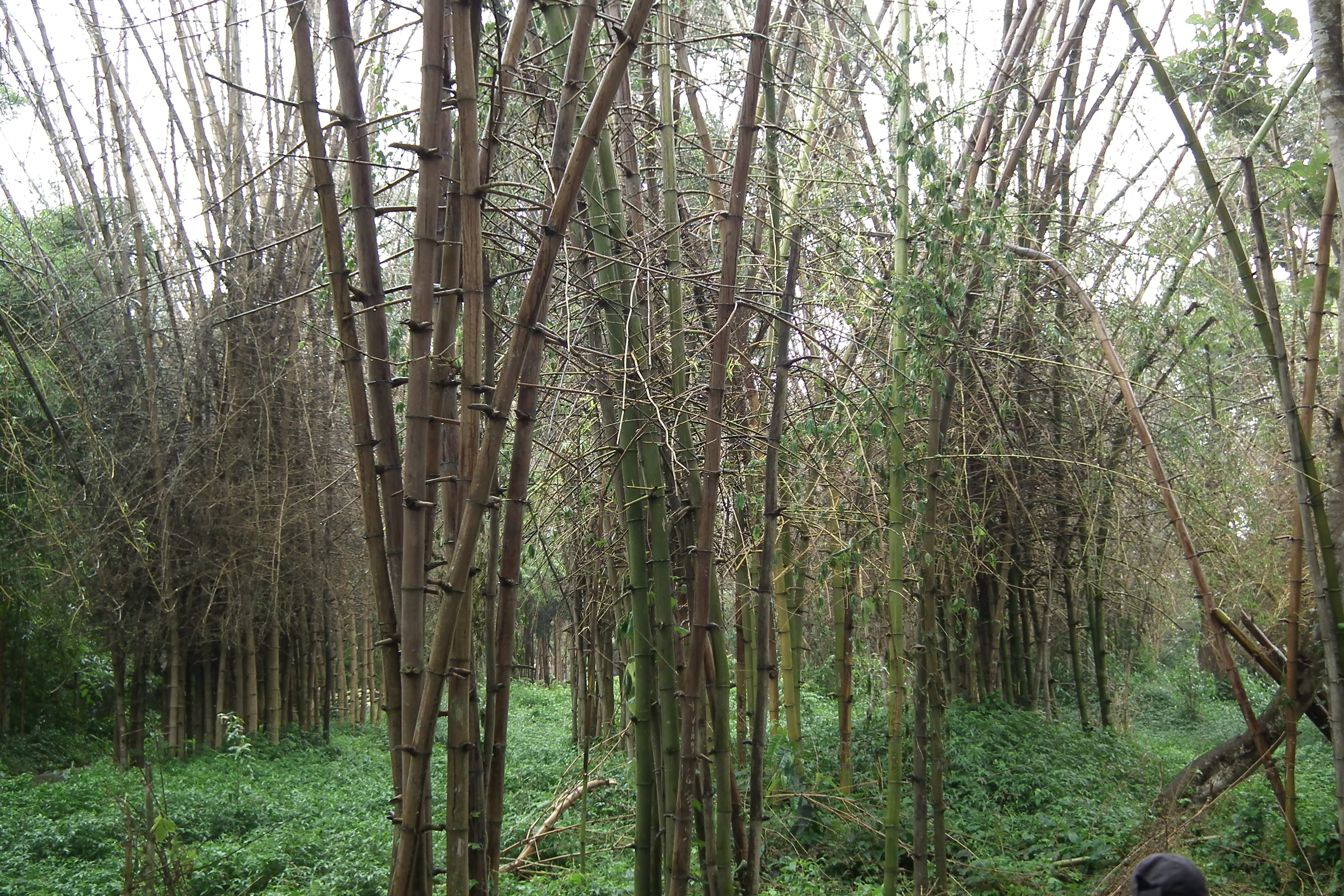
Inside the bamboo park

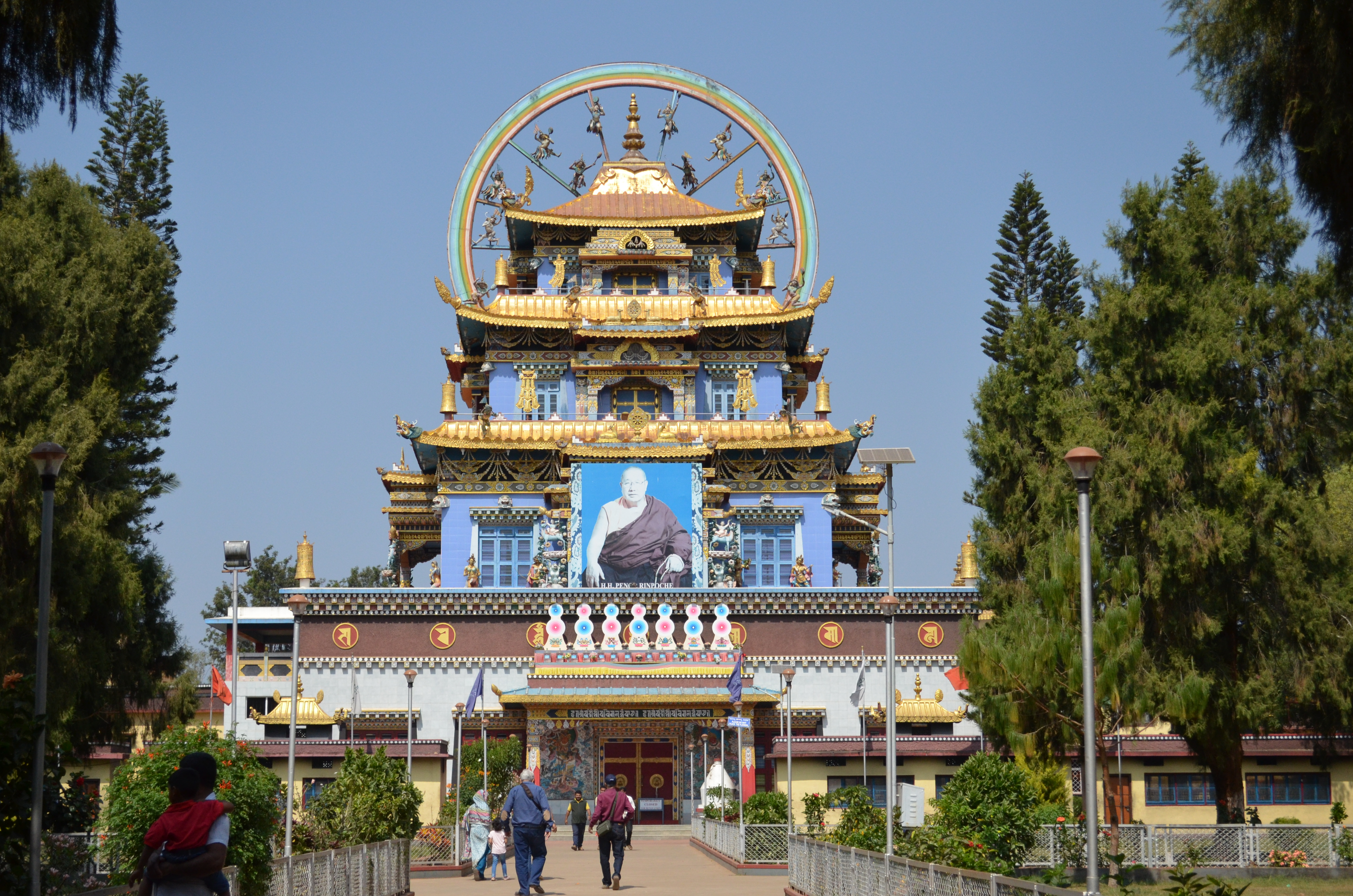
Namdroling Monastery located near Nisargadhama

Kaveri Nisargadhama is a delta which is called as island by local people, formed by river Kaveri near Kushalnagar in the district of Kodagu, Karnataka, India.

== Location ==
It is approximately 3 km (1.9 mi) from Kushalanagara, off the State Highway and 30 km (19 mi) from Madikeri, 95 km (59 mi) from Mysore and 167 km (104 mi) from Mangalore. It is a holiday destination in Karnataka.

== Orientation ==
It is a 64-acre (260,000 m^{2}) island, with lush foliage of thick bamboo groves, sandalwood and teak trees. The island is accessible through a hanging rope bridge. There are deer, rabbits, peacocks and a children's playground as well as an orchidarium.

== Facilities ==
Visitors are allowed to get into water at a few shallow and safe points along the river. Elephant rides and boating are some of the other attractions. It also has a forest department-run guest house and treetop bamboo cottages.

== See also ==
- Kanive
- Suntikoppa
- Bylakuppe
- Dubare Elephant camp
- Kushalanagar
