= Suntikoppa =

- Village
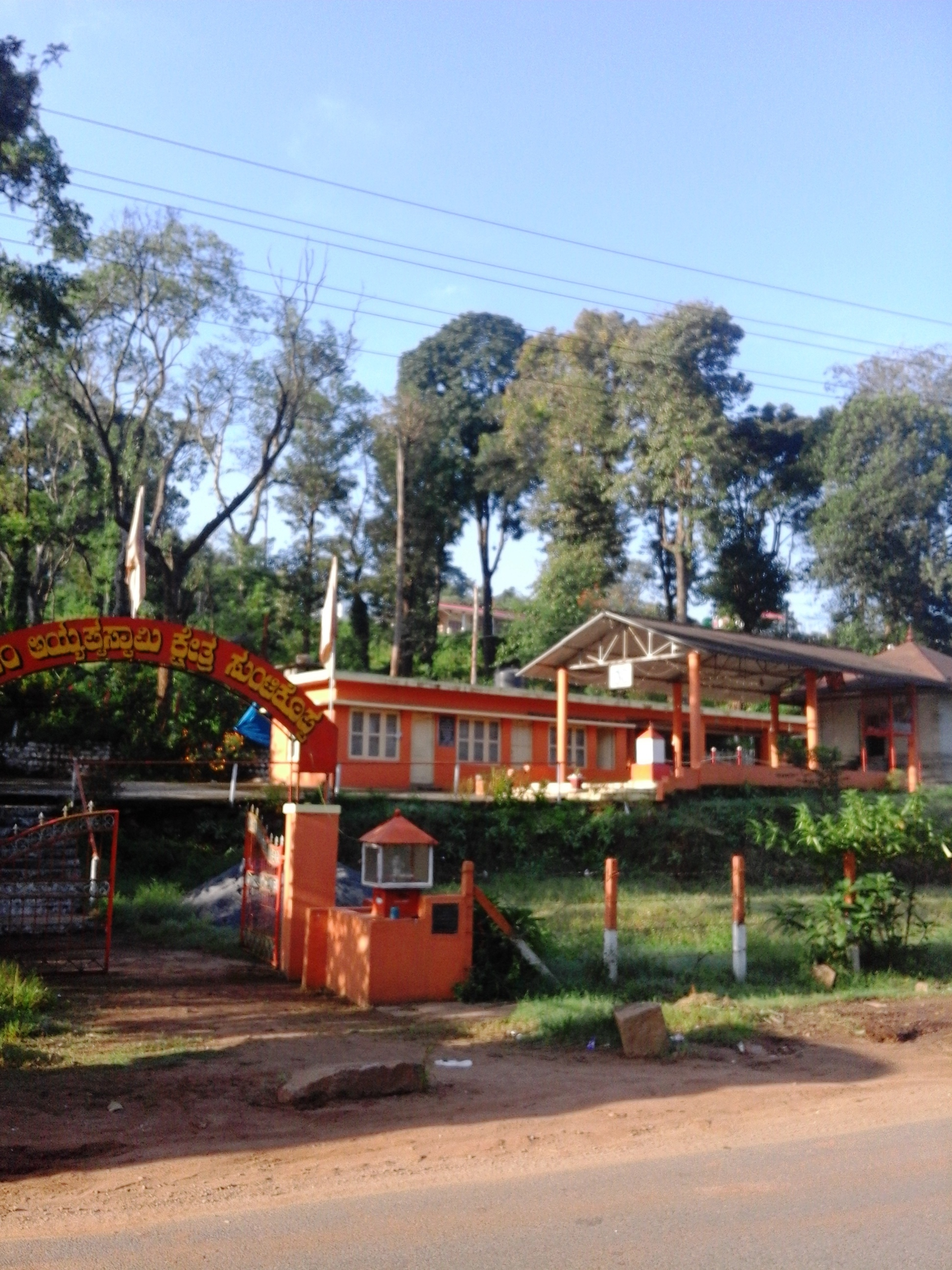
- Ayyappa Swamy Temple on Mysore Road

- Location in Karnataka, India
- Coordinates: 12°27′10″N 75°49′52″E
- Country: India
- State: Karnataka
- District: Kodagu
- Taluk: Kushalnagar

Government
  - Body: Ulugulli Grama Panchayath

Area
  - Total: 14.25 km^{2} (5.50 sq mi)
- Elevation: 995 m (3,264 ft)

Population (2011)
  - Total: 7,829
  - Density: 549.4/km^{2} (1,423/sq mi)

Languages
  - Official: Kannada
- Time zone: UTC+5:30 (IST)
- PIN: 571237
- Vehicle registration: KA-12

Suntikoppa is a village and a hobli, in Kushalanagar taluk of Kodagu district in the state of Karnataka, India.

== Location ==
Suntikoppa is a town between Madikeri and Kushalnagar on the Mangalore–Mysore–Bangalore NH-275 .
