= Kushalanagar =

- Town
- Kushalanagara
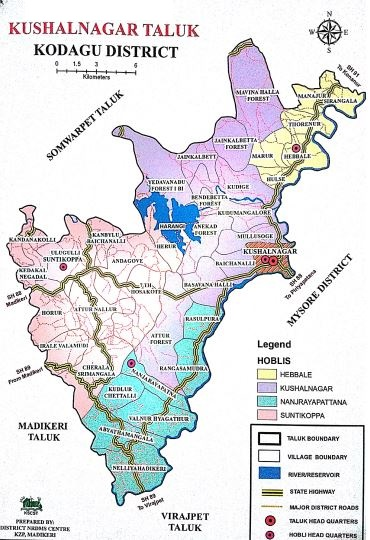
- Kushalanagar Taluk Map
- Nickname: Gateway of Kodagu
- Location in Karnataka, India Kushalanagar (India)
- Coordinates: 12.457434°N 75.960332°E
- Country: India
- State: Karnataka
- District: Kodagu

Government
  - Body: Town Municipal Council
  - Administrator: Narwade Vinayak Karbhari _{I.A.S}
  - Chief Officer: Krishna Prasad

Area
  - Town: 11.12 km^{2} (4.29 sq mi)
- Elevation: 844 m (2,769 ft)

Population (2022)
  - Town: 29,268
  - Density: 2,632/km^{2} (6,817/sq mi)
  - Metro: 80,000

Languages
  - Official: Kannada
- Time zone: UTC+5:30 (IST)
- PIN: 571 234
- Telephone code: 08276
- ISO 3166 code: IN-KA
- Vehicle registration: KA-12
- Website: www.kushalnagartown.mrc.gov.in

Kushalanagar or Kushālanagara is a city located in the Kodagu district of the Indian state of Karnataka. Surrounded by Kaveri river, it is the gateway to Kodagu district. It also serves as the headquarters of Kushalanagar Taluk. By population, Kushalanagar is the second largest town in Kodagu district after Madikeri and the fastest developing town in the district. Kushalnagar is an important commercial centre in Kodagu.

== Etymology ==
According to popular myth, the name was given by Hyder Ali who was camped there when he received news of the birth of his son Tipu and called it as Kushyal nagar (="town of gladness") But in reality, Tipu was born around 1750 while Hyder Ali entered Kodagu for the first time in the 1760s. After the British conquest of Coorg it was known as Fraserpet after Colonel James Stuart Fraser who was the Political Agent in Coorg around 1834.

== Geography ==
Kushalanagar is located at 12.47°N 75.97°E. It has an average elevation of 844 metres (2726 feet).

Kushalanagar is situated in the eastern part of Kodagu district. The town is generally flat, although a few areas are hilly. Kaveri river surrounds the town in all directions except the west. It is roughly 85 kilometres west of Mysore, 220 kilometres west of Bangalore and 170 kilometres east of Mangalore.

== Demographics ==
As of 2011 India census, Kushalanagara had a population of 23,200. The sex ratio in Kushalnagar town as per 2011 census is 980 (Somwarpet Taluk is 1027). Whereas Male population in Somwarpet Taluk was 49.22 percent (90783) and female population was 50.78 percent (93667). Kushalanagar has an average literacy rate of 89.53%, higher than the state average of 75.36%. In kushalnagar, 93.52% of male are literate while for females, the number is 85.87%. 12% of the population is under 6 years of age

Kushalnagar along with its cluster of nearby villages including Mullusoge, Baichanahalli, Gummanakolli, Kudlur and Madapatna forms one of the most densely populated areas in the district with combined population of 39,393.

The conurbation of Kushalnagar measures nearly 35km^{2}, making it largest urban settlement in the district.

== Economy ==
Kushalnagar is an important commercial centre in Kodagu. KIADB Industrial Area is located in Kudloor of Kushalnagar where multiple coffee processing industries are located.

== Education ==
Kushalanagara has an average literacy rate of 89%. The town has six private Schools, one government school (from kindergarten to degree), one polytechnic school, and city has one government engineering college affiliated to VTU. A Sainik School is located in the outrange of the town, where students receive military training.

== Notable sites nearby ==
1. Harangi Dam
2. Nisargadhama
3. Pushpagiri Wildlife Sanctuary
4. Dubare Elephant Camp
5. Mallalli Falls
6. Chiklihole

== Transport ==
Major highways passing through Kushalanagara are SH-88 later upgraded to NH-275, which is currently being expanded into a brownfield-greenfield(60:40) four-lane access-controlled highway and SH-91, connecting the town to Kannur International Airport.

KSRTC has a bus station here. They connect the town to metropolitan cities like Bangalore and KIAL, Mysore, Mangalore, Ernakulam, Madurai, Coimbatore, Hubli and many other smaller cities. The nearest railway stations are K R Nagar at a distance of 60 kms and Mysore at the distance of 85 kms.

There is no railway service in Kodagu. A proposed new railway line project from Mysore to Kushalnagar was shelved on January 2026.The nearest airport is at Mysore, and the nearest international airport is Kannur International Airport. The Airports Authority of India has proposed a construction of a new mini airport named Kushalnagar airport in the town to boost tourism from other parts of the state.

== See also ==
- Madikeri
- Kaveri Nisargadhama
- Mangalore
- Somvarpet
- Virajpet
