= Economy of Mangaluru =

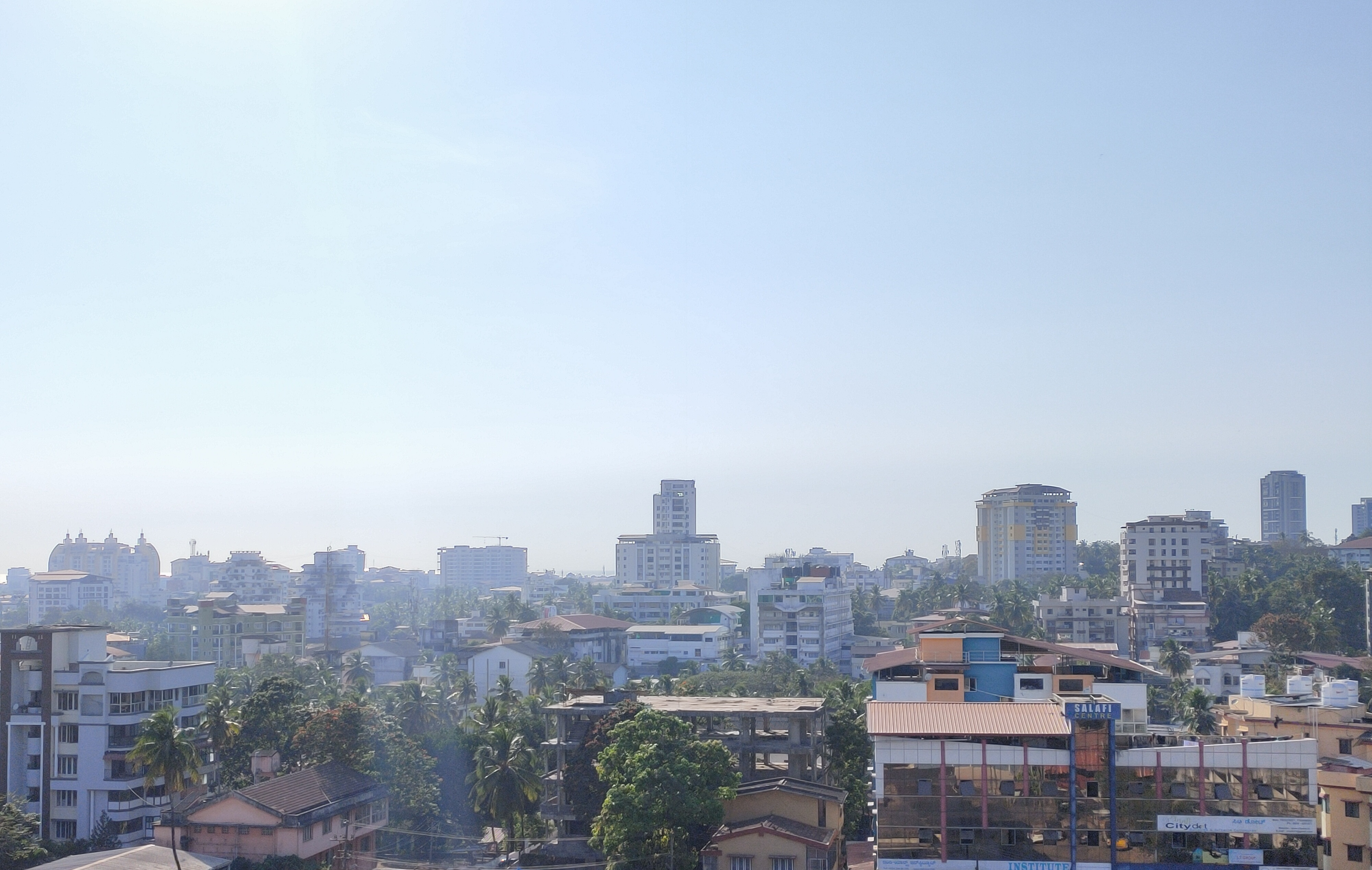
Mangaluru skyline

Industrial and commercial activities dominate Mangaluru's economy. Mangaluru is the only city in the state of Karnataka to have all modes of transport — air, road, rail and sea — as well as being one of only five cities in India to have both a major port and an international airport. Around 75% of India's coffee, timber and cashew nuts exports are handled by the New Mangalore Port. Mangalore International Airport is one of only two international airports in Karnataka; the other being Bengaluru's Kempegowda International Airport. Mangaluru is the fastest growing non-metropolitan area (Indian city of population less than one million) in South India and the second largest business centre in Karnataka. The city has some of the tallest buildings in South India, with many more under construction.

== Petrochemicals and processing ==
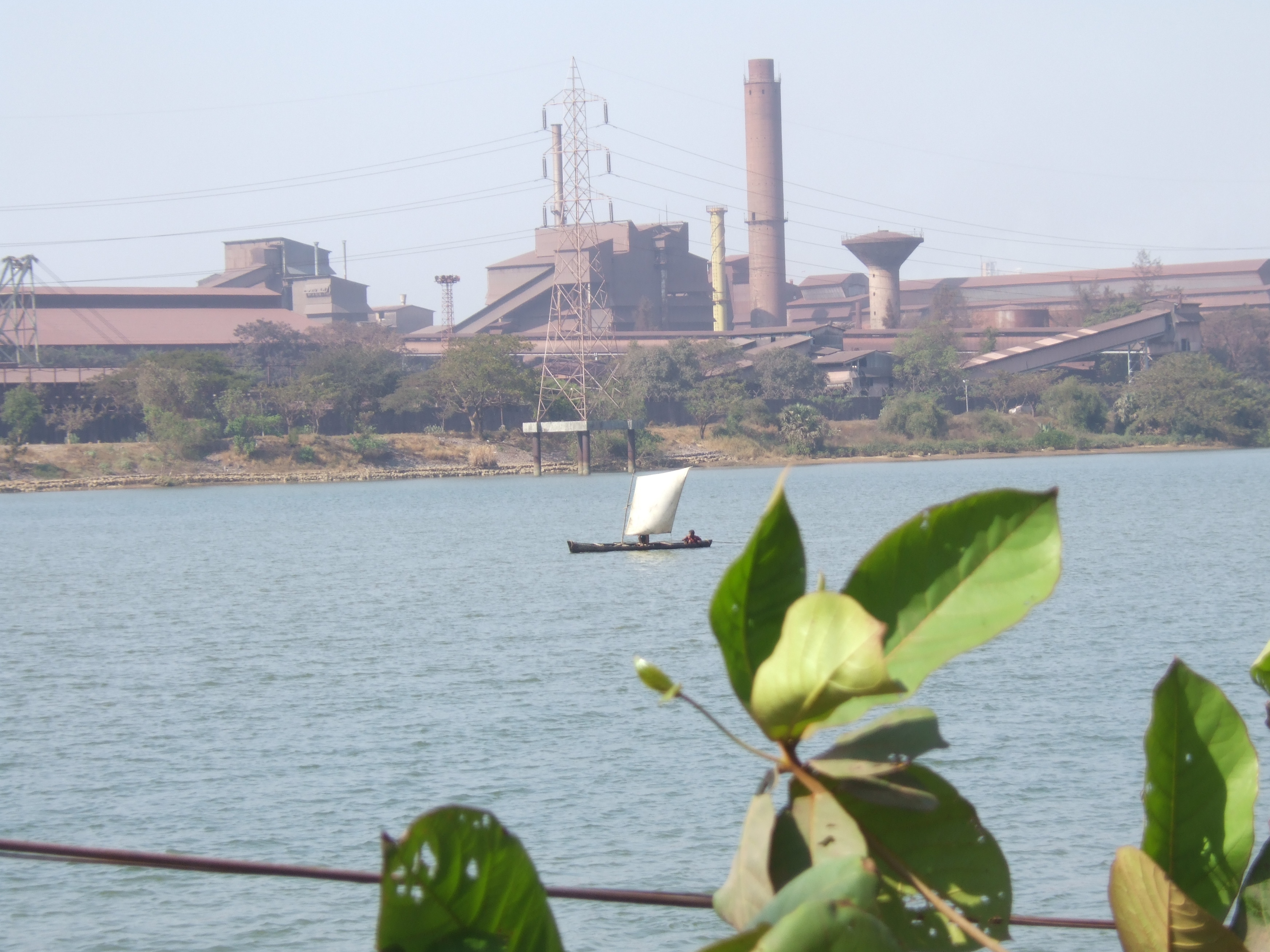
The Kudremukh Iron Ore Company in Mangalore

BASF, Mangalore Refinery and Petrochemicals Ltd. (MRPL), Mangalore Chemicals and Fertilizers Ltd. (MCF), Kudremukh Iron Ore Company Ltd. (KIOCL), Hindustan Petroleum Corporation Limited (HPCL), Bharat Petroleum Corporation Plant (BPCL), Indian Oil Corporation Limited (IOCL), ONGC Mangalore Petrochemicals Limited (OMPL), JBF Petrochemicals and Total Oil are the major petrochemicals and processing industries in Mangaluru. One of the largest SEZ in India, the ONGC - Mangalore Special Economic Zone is in Mangaluru. MRPL, the only refinery in the state, will soon get a Navaratna status. Mangalore Chemicals & Fertilizers (MCF), the only fertilizer factory in the state, is situated at Baikampady. HPCL has its oil refinery at Mangaluru. BPCL has established an LPG plant near the New Mangalore Port. BASF has established a Research and development (R&D) centre at Mangaluru.

At the Mangaluru Special Economic Zone, in a new 15 million tonne refinery, petrochemical plant and power and LNG plants, The Oil and Natural Gas Corporation (ONGC) plans to invest over Rs. 35,000 crore. Of the country, this will be the first Petroleum, Chemicals, Petrochemicals Investment Region (PCPIR). India has built 5.33 million tons of strategic crude oil storages at Mangalore, Padur (near Udupi) in Karnataka and at Visakhapatnam to ensure energy security. Mitsui, a Japanese conglomerate has planned to set up an LNG terminal in Mangalore.

== Logistics and Shipping ==
Interlog Services, a French logistics firm has established its office at Mangaluru Hills.

The table below lists some of the Logistics and Shipping companies situated in Mangaluru.

Logistics and Shipping firm	Headquarters
Interlog Services	Orléans, France
Seaways Shipping and Logistics Ltd.	Hyderabad, India
Delta Infralogistics (worldwide) Ltd.	Mangaluru, India
Hapag-Lloyd	Hamburg, Germany
Maersk Line	Copenhagen, Denmark
SeaShine Shipping and Logistics Ltd.	Chennai, India
CMA CGM	Marseille, France
Morrison Express	Taipei, Taiwan
DIX Shipping Ltd.	Mangaluru, India

== Ship building ==
Bharati Shipyard Ltd (BSL) (now known as Bharati Defence and Infrastructure Limited) has established its ship building site near Tannirbavi in Mangaluru. Mangaluru is the 6th shipyard established by BSL. Cargo ships are built here which have a maximum length of 120 meters. BSL's subsidiary, Tebma Shipyard Limited has a ship manufacturing site at Malpe, which is 56 km from Mangalore city.

== Manufacturing industries ==
Sequent Scientific Ltd. is a Pharmaceutical company, and has its manufacturing unit at Baikampady in Mangaluru. Syngene International, a contract research arm of Biocon, has set up its manufacturing plant at Mangaluru SEZ. Solara, a pharmaceutical company also has its manufacturing unit in Mangaluru. Hindustan Unilever has set up a factory in Boloor which produces mainly Rin detergents. Suzlon has established its wind energy generation plant at Padubidri near Mangaluru. Suzlon Energy plans to manufacture REpower wind turbines at its plant near Mangaluru. Bakery and confectionery industries are also found in Mangaluru; Gyp-gyp-gy and Narans are a few among them. Primacy Industries Ltd. in Mangaluru manufactures scented candles and exports them to Europe, United States and the Middle-East. Catasynth Speciality Chemicals, a manufacturing facility of Anthea Group has its office in Mangaluru.

== Banking and Finance ==
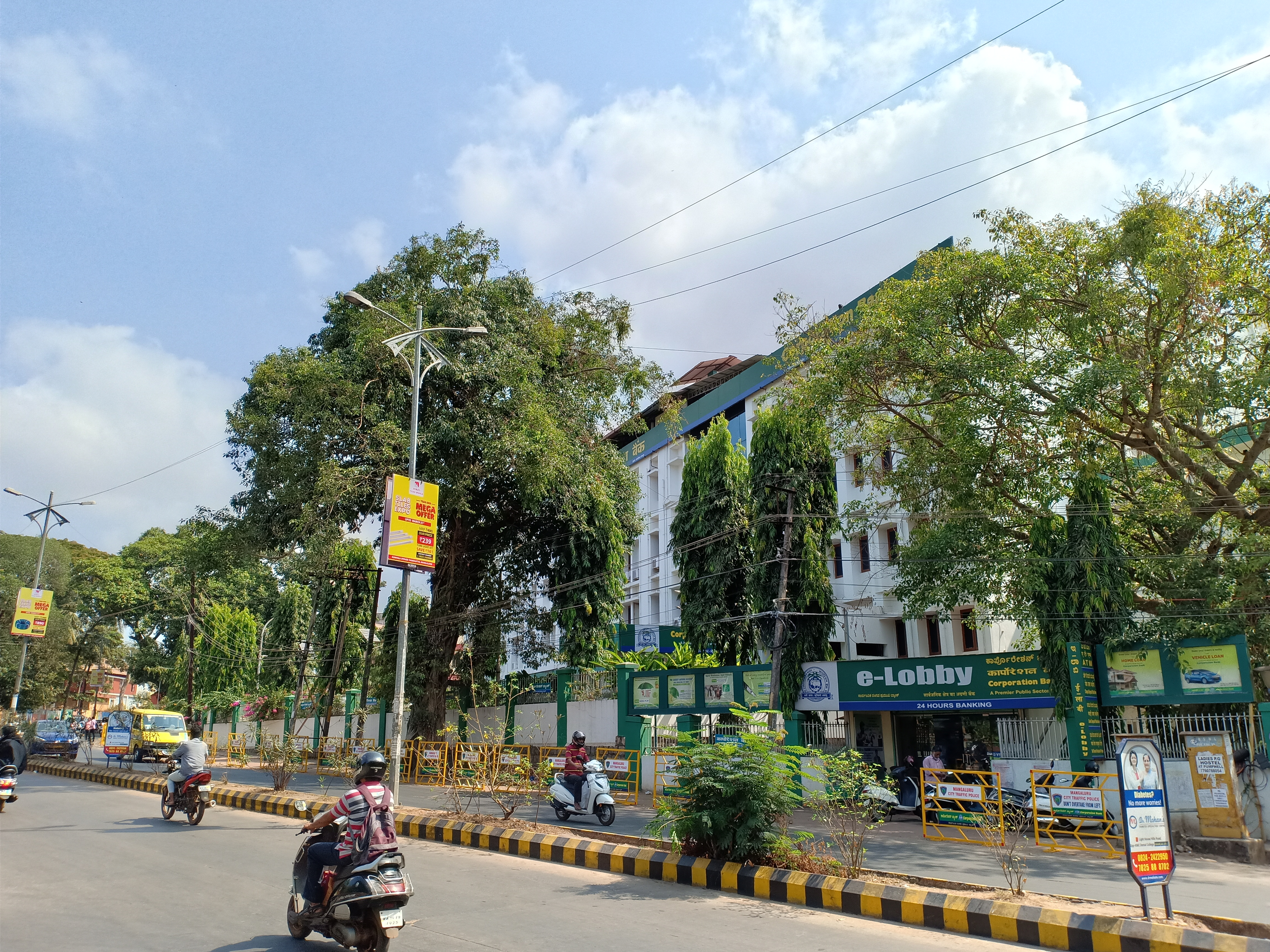
Corporation Bank headquarters at Pandeshwar in Mangalore

Four of the twenty banks nationalized during the first half of the 20th century were established in Mangaluru.

Bank	Founded	Founded by	Head Office (present)
Corporation Bank	1906; 120 years ago	Khan Bahadur Haji Abdulla	Non-existent bank
Canara Bank	1906; 120 years ago	Ammembal Subba Rao Pai	Bangalore
Syndicate Bank	1925; 101 years ago	T. M. A. Pai	Non-existent bank
Vijaya Bank	1931; 95 years ago	A. B. Shetty	Non-existent bank

Karnataka Bank Limited was established on 18 February 1924 in Mangalore. In addition to these, two banks were established in nearby towns. Corporation Bank was founded in Udupi by Khan Bahadur Haji Abdulla Haji Kasim Saheb Bahadur in 1906, and Syndicate Bank was co-founded in Manipal by T M A Pai, Upendra Ananth Pai and V S Kudva in 1925. While Karnataka Bank Limited is still headquartered in Mangaluru, Canara Bank is headquartered in Bengaluru.

The Mangalore Stock Exchange (MgSE) was incorporated on 31 July 1984 as a public limited company. The company was granted recognition as a stock exchange on 9 September 1985. It was de-recognized by the Securities and Exchange Board of India (SEBI) on 31 August 2004. Appeals by the Stock Exchange to overrule this order have been subsequently rejected on 2 November 2005 and 4 October 2006.

== Robotics and Automation ==
Mangalore Robautonics Pvt Ltd is a company that designs, develops and manufactures Robotics and Automation systems for agricultural, industrial and consumer sectors.

Robotics Company	Location
Mangalore Robautonics Pvt. Ltd	Kulur
Vanora Robots	Bejai
Epitas Software LLP	Derebail
Unimation Robotics	Falnir

== Information Technology (IT) ==
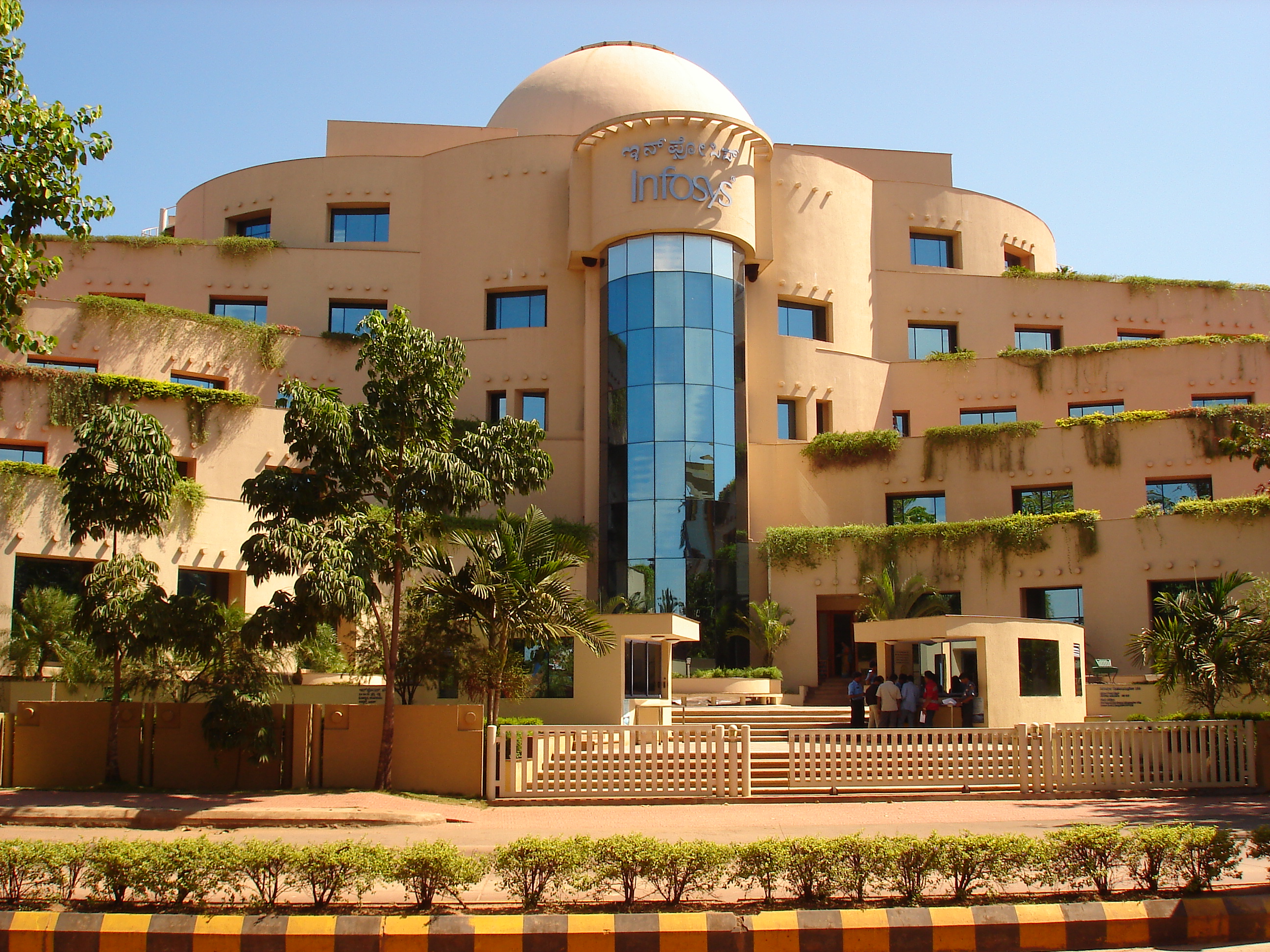
Infosys campus in Mangalore

Major information technology (IT) and software companies like Infosys, Cognizant Technology Solutions, Endurance International Group and Thomson Reuters have their branches at Mangaluru. Tata Consultancy Services (TCS) has planned to invest ₹500 crore (US$51.92 million) and setup its office at Karnad near Mangaluru.

Other multinational software companies having their presence in this coastal city include Novigo Solutions, MResult, Riskonnect (specialized in Risk management), Coresight Research (specialized in Artificial Intelligence, Analytics and Blockchain), Arkieva (specialized in Supply Chain management) and Tetherfi (specialized in Virtual Banking and Automation). Mphasis BPO has one of its branches at Mangalore. KEONICS has planned to set up an IT park in Mangalore, similar to Electronic City, spanning an area of 100 acres.

== Food processing ==
Campco has its chocolate manufacturing plants at Baikampady and Puttur near Mangalore. The plant produces chocolates and other products of cocoa both under its own brand and also for Nestle. Achal Industries has built its cashew processing plant at the Baikampady Industrial Estate in Mangalore. Ideal Ice Cream Factory, situated at Kottara Chowki in Mangalore, manufactures over 40 flavours of ice-creams. Mangalore also houses the edible oil refinery of Adani Wilmar.

Industry	Location
Campco Ltd	APMC Yard, Baikampady
Achal Industries	Industrial Area, Baikampady
Mangala Cashew Industries (DVK Group)	Padavinangadi
Kalbavi Cashews	Industrial Area, Baikampady
Ideal Ice Cream Factory	Kottara Chowki
Spectrum Industries	Yeyyadi Industrial Estate

== Cruise tourism ==
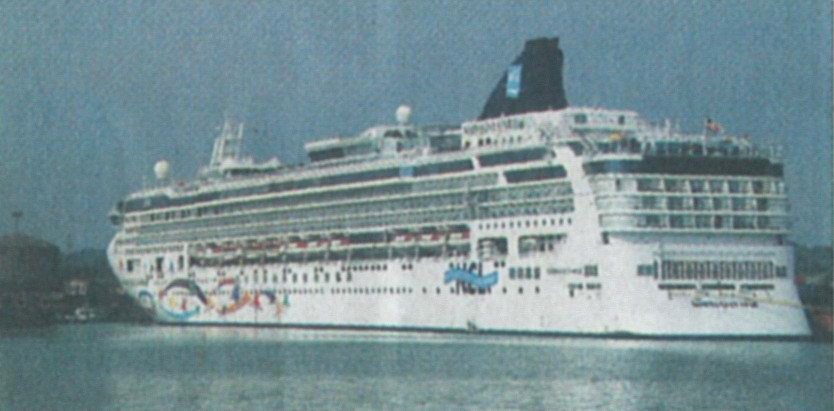
Norwegian Star, a Cruise ship docked at the New Mangalore Port

Various cruise ships such as Regent Seven Seas, Norwegian Star, Oceania, Celebrity, Costa, AIDA, Nautica and Royal Caribbean International have visited the New Mangalore Port. Foreigners can enter Mangalore through the New Mangalore Port with the help of Electronic visa (e-visa). Cruise ships from Europe, North America and UAE arrive at New Mangalore Port to tour the places around Mangalore.

== Startups ==
Government of India has planned to make Mangaluru the first startup district in the country with 20 tinkering labs and incubation centres. The startups aim at providing solutions in agriculture, health, education and information technology. Centre for Entrepreneurship Opportunities and Learning (CEOL) - the first startup incubation centre of Coastal Karnataka is present at Mallikatta in Mangaluru city. Government of Karnataka has planned to make Mangaluru an Animation hub for the State.

== Research and Development (R&D) centres ==
There are 3 Research and Development (R&D) centres near Mangalore. They are

- BASF - located at Katipalla
- Central Plantation Crops Research Institute (CPCRI) - located at Vitla
- National Research Centre for Cashew (NRCC) - located at Puttur

== Special Economic Zones ==
The following special economic zones to be located in and around Mangalore have been approved by Board of Approval, Government Of India & Under establishment.

Location	Status	Name of Promoter
Multi Product Special Economic Zone - 588 hectares	Attracted Rs.13,000 crores until date with exports from units exceeding Rs.2,500 crores.	Mangaluru SEZ Ltd.
Infosys - IT&ITES SEZ - 125 hectares	Notified and 1st phase operational	Infosys Tech. Ltd.
Thumbay, Bantwal, Dakshina Kannada District - IT/ITES SEZ - 10 hectares	Formal approval and notified. Under Implementation.	B.A.Tech Park Pvt. Ltd.
KIADB - IT&ITES SEZ - 203 hectares	Formal approval	Karnataka Industrial Areas Development Board
EPIP Indl.Area, Ganjimutt - IT/ITES SEZ - 10 hectares	Formal approval	Nitesh Estates Private Limited
EPIP Indl.Area, Ganjimutt - IT/ITES SEZ - 10 hectares	Formal approval	Brigade Enterprises Private Limited
EPIP Indl.Area, Ganjimutt - IT/ITES SEZ - 10 hectares	Formal approval	Kinfotech Software Pvt. Ltd.
Padubidri, Udupi District. - Hi-tech Engineering SEZ - 259 hectares	Notified and 1st phase operational.	Suzlon Infrastructure Ltd.

== Fishing ==
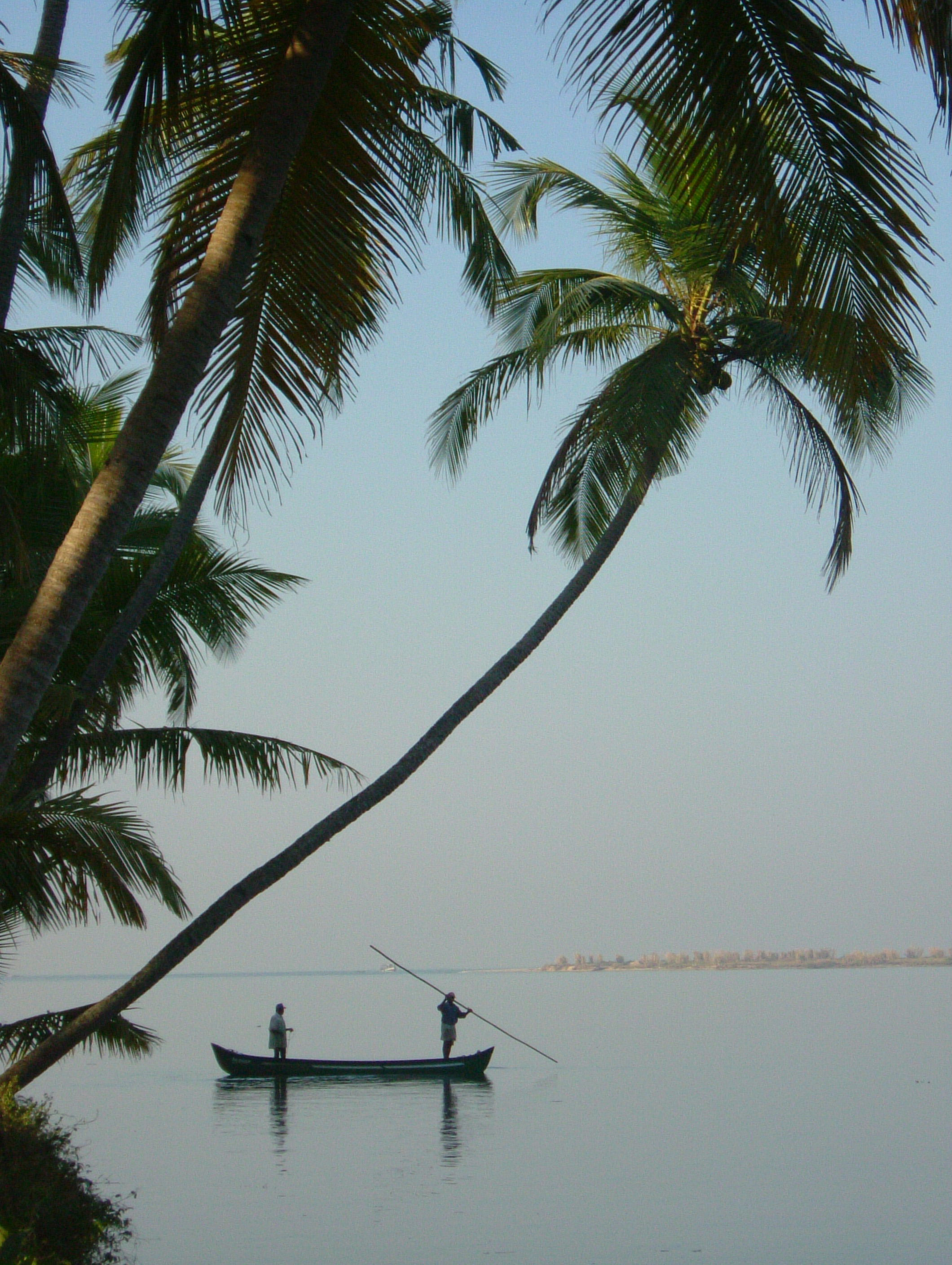
Fishing in Mukka, in Mangaluru taluk

Fish is one of the widely consumed food in Mangalore. Old Mangalore Port is the fishing port in Mangalore. The city has an ice factory on the banks of Netravati river and fish meal processing industries.

== Traditional commerce and industry ==
=== Tile industry ===
Although the tile industry has been in decline due to the predominance of concrete in modern construction, Mangalore tiles were exported to East Asia, Europe, Australia, Africa, and the Middle East.

=== Arecanut industry ===
Arecanut industries are small-scale operations. Arecanuts are cultivated in the hilly regions towards the east of the city.

=== Leaf spring industry ===
The leaf spring industry has its presence in Mangalore, with Canara Workshops Ltd. and Lamina Suspension Products Ltd. in the city.

== See also ==
- Balmatta
- Falnir
- Kankanady
- Attavar
- Pandeshwar
- Bejai
- Kodialbail
- Kadri, Mangalore
