= Economy of South India =

Economic and demographic indicators
| Parameter | Southern states of India | National |
| Per capita net state domestic product (SDP) | ₹234712.16 (US$3,200) | ₹162416.60 (US$2,191) |
| Percentage share in total FDI approved (1993–2003) | 5.48 | 4.12 |
| Average annual growth of SDP | 5.6 | 3.6 |
| Percentage of population below poverty line | 15.41 | 29.10 |
| Percentage of urban population (%) | 35.82 | 23.81 |
| Percentage of households with electricity (%) | 98.91% | 67.4 |
| Literacy rate | 82.87 | 75 |

The economy of South India after independence in 1947 conformed to a socialist framework, with strict governmental control over private sector participation, foreign trade and foreign direct investment (FDI). Through 1960s–1990s, South Indian economies experienced mixed economic growth. In the 1960s, Kerala achieved above-average economic growth, while Andhra Pradesh's economy declined during this period. Similarly, Kerala experienced an economic decline in the 1970s while the economies of Tamil Nadu, Andhra Pradesh, and Karnataka consistently exceeded national average growth rates after 1970. South India first started to overtake the rest of India economically in the 1980s. Andhra Pradesh, Tamil Nadu and Karnataka were noted by some to be more reform-oriented in terms of economic policy when compared to other Indian states. Over the last decade South India has grown at 8% annually. Future savings may be negatively impacted by a growth in an aging population in South Indian states, as the aging population will require more money for healthcare expenses. However, this will not severely impact state domestic product as India's overall population is also expected to decline. Today, South India has about 20% of India's population, and contributes about 31% of India's GDP; it is projected to contribute 35% by 2030.

Over 48% of South India's population is engaged in agriculture, which is largely dependent on seasonal monsoons. Some of the main crops cultivated in South India include paddy, sorghum, pearl millet, pulses, sugarcane, cotton, chilli, and ragi. Areca, coffee, tea, vanilla, rubber, pepper, tapioca, and cardamom are cultivated on the hills, while coconut grows in abundance in coastal areas. The region is the most industrialized in the country with the city of Bengaluru, deserving its place as the IT Hub of India and having the highest no of software companies country-wide. Information Technology is a growing field in South India with Bengaluru home to over 200 software companies. Three of the country's top software exporters—,Bengaluru, Chennai and Hyderabad—are located in South India.

Economic Indicators
| Parameter | Andhra Pradesh | Karnataka | Kerala | Tamil Nadu | Telangana | Southern states of India | All India |
| Per Capita Income By States (PCI) (2025–26) | $4,031 | $5,248 | $4,780 | $5,437 | $5,721 | $4,903 | $2,818 |
| Gross State Domestic Product (2025–26) | ₹18.30 lakh crore (US$216 billion) | ₹30.70 lakh crore (US$360 billion) | ₹14.27 lakh crore (US$167 billion) | 35.67 lakh crore (US$420 billion) | ₹18.00 lakh crore (US$210 billion) | ₹116.94 lakh crore (US$1373 billion) | ₹357.14 lakh crore (US$4.2 trillion) |

== Andhra Pradesh ==
Visakhapatnam district leads in Industrial sector and Service sector, which contributed ₹17,598 crore (US$1.8 billion) and ₹31,372 crore (US$3.3 billion) respectively. The per capita income of the state for 2014–15 was $$1,780.47

Agricultural sector is one of the chief sector contributing to the economy of Andhra Pradesh. Two important rivers of India, the Godavari and Krishna, flow through the state, which provide fertile soil favourable for agriculture. The state is the main producer of Rice and hence, it is also known as Rice Bowl of India. Poultry is another sector in the state contributing to the economy of the state. The state is a leading egg producer and also nicknamed as Egg Bowl of Asia.

The state has also started to focus on the fields of Information technology and Biotechnology. Cities such as Visakhapatnam and Vijayawada have shown growth in IT exports. During 2012–13, the contribution of Visakhapatnam was ₹1,445 crore (US$150 million) while it was ₹115.26 crore (US$12 million) for Vijayawada. This is a chart of trend of gross state domestic product of Andhra Pradesh at market prices by Ministry of Statistics and Programme Implementation with figures in crores of Indian Rupees. Accordingly, the state ranks fourth in terms of overall gross state domestic product and fourth in per capita gross state domestic product among the major states of India.

== Karnataka ==
Karnataka's net state domestic product is of $4 billion. Bengaluru, Mysuru, Mangaluru & Hubballi-Dharwad are the major contributors, Belagavi & Kalaburagi are the other important cities contributing to the economy of Karnataka. Between 1992 and 2002, Karnataka attracted the fourth highest total Foreign Direct Investment approvals in India, to the tune of Rs. 21,566 million. Karnataka accounts for one third of India's Information technology exports. For the year 2006, the state is expected to bring in 37% of all IT revenues amounting to Rs. 370 billion ($8.2 billion). Nearly 35% of IT companies and 40% of bio-technology companies are based here. Agriculture in Karnataka, like most of India, employs 80% of the population. Agriculture and its allied activities account for 49% of the state's income. The coastal plains of Karnataka, which include Uttara Kannada and Dakshina Kannada are cultivated with rice and sugarcane. Coffee and Tea are also grown on the slopes of the Western Ghats in the district of Kodagu, Chikkamagaluru and Hassana. Karnataka produces 70% of India's coffee, of which about 50% is exported. The black soil in the northwest of the state, is hospitable for the growth of cotton, onion, course cereal, sunflower and peanuts.

The forests of the Malenadu region produce timber, bamboo and sandalwood. Karnataka is the only exporter of sandalwood in the country. Most of the world's sandalwood oil is produced in Karnataka. All of India's gold comes from the Kolar district of Karnataka. Karnataka is also rich in minerals which form the bulk of the raw materials for iron and steel industries in the state such as the one at Bhadravati. All of India's Iron ore comes from the Malnad region. The first power station in Asia was set up in Karnataka at Shivanasamudra in 1902 to produce hydroelectric power. Karnataka has 18 power stations which generate annually 16,513 million units. The state, however generates insufficient power and is forced to buy electricity from neighbouring states.

=== Mangaluru ===
One of the biggest business centres & the fastest growing cities in India. It is the best city to do business, after the capital Bengaluru in Karnataka. It is the major & the fastest growing city in Karnataka only after Bengaluru. It is the largest city in the Coastal and Malnad regions of Karnataka, besides being a leading commercial, industrial, educational, healthcare and petrochemical hub on the West Coast. It is also the 13th best business destination in India and 2nd best in Karnataka. One of the largest SEZ's in India, the ONGC MSEZ is in Mangalore. The way in which the city is growing can be gauged by pace of growth of real estate industry. Mangalore's economy is dominated by the industrial, commercial, agricultural processing and port-related activities. Karnataka's 2nd biggest industrial area-Baikampady is in Mangalore. The New Mangalore Port is India's seventh largest port, in terms of cargo handling. It handles 75 per cent of India's coffee exports and the bulk of its cashew nuts. The city's major enterprises include Mangalore Chemicals and Fertilizers Ltd. (MCF), Kudremukh Iron Ore Company Ltd. (KIOCL), Mangalore Refinery and Petrochemicals Ltd. (MRPL), BASF, Bharati Shipyard Limited and TotalEnergies India Limited (ELF Gas). Mangalore is one among the only 5 cities in the country to have both a Major Port and an International Airport. Mangalore also has an IT Park called Soorya IT Park in Mudipu. Mangalore is also home to the National Institute of Technology, Karnataka. Major information technology (IT) and outsourcing companies like Infosys, Cognizant Technology Solutions, MphasiS BPO, Thomson Reuters, Endurance International Group have established a presence in Mangalore. Plans to create three dedicated I.T. parks are underway, with two parks (Export Promotion Industrial park (EPIP) at Ganjimutt and Special Economic Zone (SEZ) near Mangalore University) currently under construction. A third IT SEZ is being proposed at Ganjimutt. Another IT SEZ, sponsored by the BA group, is under construction at Thumbe and spans 2 million square feet (180,000 m^{2}).

The Oil and Natural Gas Corporation (ONGC) plans to invest over ₹35000 crore (US$5.15 billion) in a new 15 million tonne refinery, petrochemical plant and power, as well as LNG plants at the Mangalore Special Economic Zone. Indian Strategic Petroleum Reserves Ltd, a special purpose vehicle under the Oil Industry Development Board, is developing strategic crude oil reserves in Mangalore and two other places in India. Out of the proposed 5 million metric tonnes (MMT) storage, 1.5 MMT would be at Mangalore. According to an International edition of India Today (28 November – 4 December 2006), Mangalore is the fastest growing non-metro in South India.

Corporation Bank, Canara Bank, and Vijaya Bank were the three nationalised banks established in Mangalore during the first half of the 20th century. Karnataka Bank, founded in Mangalore, was one of the largest banks to have not been taken over by the Government. The Mangalore Catholic Co-operative Bank (MCC Bank) Ltd. and SCDCC Bank were the scheduled banks established in Mangalore. Mangalore city is one of the best connected cities in South India with 4 National Highways (17,48,13 & 169; all old numbers), apart from other roadways, railways, waterways and airways. Udupi the temple city is contributing towards the higher education with large number of professional colleges in Manipal. It is also the home of the software company Robosoft Technologies.

=== Hubballi-Dharwad ===
Hubli-Dharwad is the second largest city in Karnataka, in terms of area and population, and is one of the 49 Metropolitan clusters selected by McKinsey & Company as growth hotspots in India. It is also a major city in terms of Administration, Business and Commerce in Karnataka after Bengaluru and Mangalore. It is the nerve centre for North Karnataka region. It is the fastest growing city after the capital, Bengaluru and the port city Mangalore. It is the Headquarters of South Western Railway, and the Hubli Division of SWR is one of the highest revenue generating railway divisions in India. The High Court of Karnataka is situated at Belur in Hubli-Dharwad, it also has the largest number of government offices outside Bengaluru. The Agriculture Produce market at Amargol in Hubli is one of the largest markets in Asia and the cotton market is among the largest cotton markets in India. The city is a major industrial centre, the railway workshop set-up in 1880 is one of the oldest workshops in India and is also the largest holder of EMD locomotives of Indian Railway, the city is home to Tata Motors, Marcopolo, Hitachi Construction Equipment, Telcon, Sankalp Semiconductors etc. Infosys is about to start its operations from Hubli with a campus of over 50 acres. Hubli, also known as Hubballi, is the second major city of Karnataka. The city has a huge Maharashtrian's effect on it. It was ruled by Marathas and Peshwas for a long time. In old times, Hubli used to be a business centre and it grew some useful things for trade such as cotton, peanuts and chilly.

The city is also named as chhota Mumbai and resides 550 km from Mumbai. It is a fast growing city and turning into a technology hub. It is also being seen as an alternative to Bengaluru. Hubli is often known combined with Dharwad, a nearby city. The importance of these two cities can be understood by the fact that they have been recently selected by Indian Government for the smart city project.

=== Mysuru ===
Mysore is the third largest and a very important city in Karnataka. Being tagged as the Heritage City, tourism is a major economic driver and while it is among the top tourist attractions in India, it is said to rank next only to Madame Tussauds in London in the list of most-visited tourist attractions receiving more than 3 million tourists per year. On the IT front, Infosys has developed the world's largest corporate training centre in the city. Mysore is the second largest exporter of IT in the state and it houses nearly 60 major and minor IT players registered with the Software Technology Park of India [STPI], Mysore and this includes Infosys, WIPRO Technologies, IBM software, Paradigms India, WIFI Net, Logrosoft, Excel soft and Larsen & Toubro Infotech, Theorem etc. Mysore figured high in the vibrancy index survey of Morgan Stanley India last year. Mysore & Bengaluru account for more than 60% of the incense stick manufacture & export.

== Kerala ==
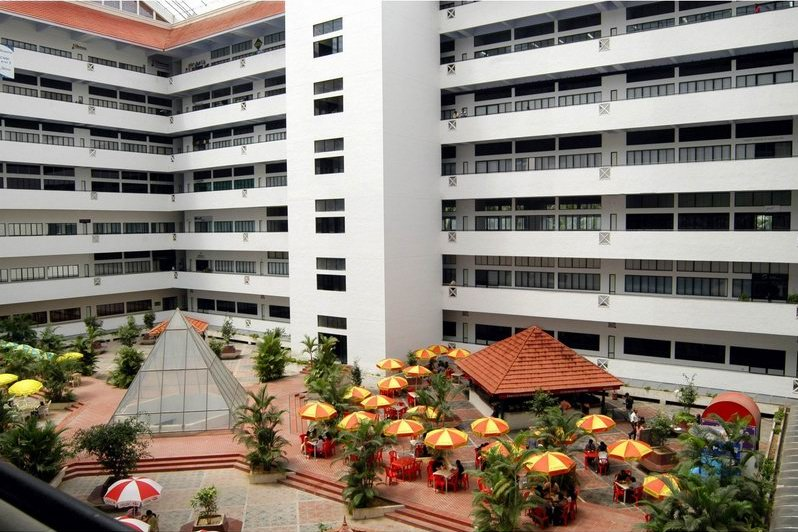
The interior of a building in the Technopark, at Thiruvananthapuram (Trivandrum). 70% of the state's IT exports are from Technopark.

Kerala's economy is predominantly service-based. As per a recent Niti Aayog report, Kerala has been ranked the most investment friendly state in India, and in terms of Human Development Index and life standard of the people, Kerala is ahead of all other states in India. In fact, in certain development indices it is on a par with some of the developed countries. This peculiar paradox is often termed as the "Kerala Phenomenon" or Kerala model of development by experts.

Kerala follows a mixed capitalist-welfare economy. In fact, the state's strong emphasis on social welfare has also resulted in slow economic progress. There are few major industries in Kerala, but the per capita GDP is higher than the national average. Remittances from Keralites working abroad, mainly in the Middle East, makes up a large share in Kerala's Gross Domestic Product.

However, today, the state is emerging as a future IT centre of India, owing to its high internet connectivity (undersea cable landing points at Kochi), along with skilled labour. The government has established three IT Parks in the state are Technopark in Trivandrum and Infopark in Kochi and Cyberpark Calicut. The Technopark at Trivandrum is the third largest IT park in Asia, and the largest in India. In addition to Inforpark in Kochi, an IT park named as Smartcity by Dubai Internet City is under construction. Kochi is a safe natural harbour, and hence one of the most important ports of India. A new International Container Transshipment Terminal is commissioned at Vallarpadam, which is expected to be a major transshipment port in India. In addition, the construction of the proposed mega Deep Water Container Transshipment Port at Vizhinjam near Trivandrum is expected to boost up the economy of the state.

Coconut, tea and coffee are grown extensively, along with rubber, cashew and spices. Spices commonly cultivated in Kerala include pepper, cardamom, vanilla, cinnamon and nutmeg. Much of Kerala's agriculture is in the form of home gardens.

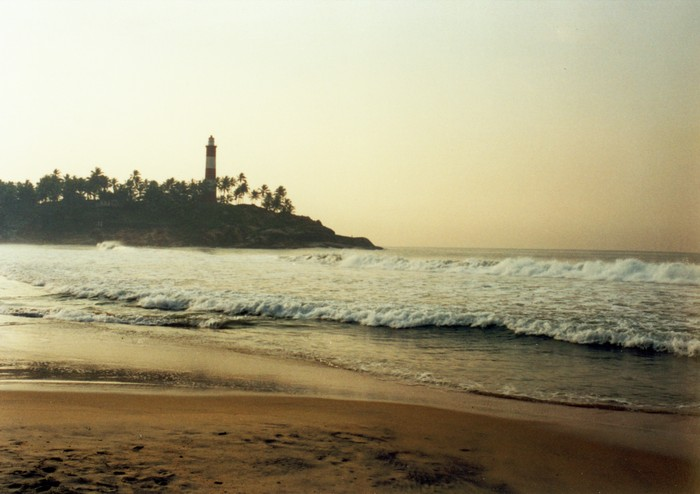
Dusk in Kovalam beach, Trivandrum

Unemployment is typically high in Kerala, though a recent study by centre for development studies in trivandrum have shown unemployment rate down to 9%.Traditional low-wage cottage industries such as the processing of coconut fibre and cashew or weaving employ most workers. More half of Kerala's workers are employed in the service sector.

One of the major ship building yards of India is in Kerala at Kochi. The Southern Naval Command of India has its headquarters in Kochi, and the Southern Air Command headquarters is in Thiruvananthapuram (Trivandrum). There are four international airports in Kerala. They are Trivandrum, Cochin, Kozhikode and Kannur. Cochin International Airport is the first International Airport in India that has been built with private participation, without the Central Government's stake.

Kerala is also one of the tourist hot-spots of India. It was proclaimed as one of the ten paradises on earth by the National Geographic traveller. The state has also won a large number of awards for its ecotourism initiatives.

== Tamil Nadu ==
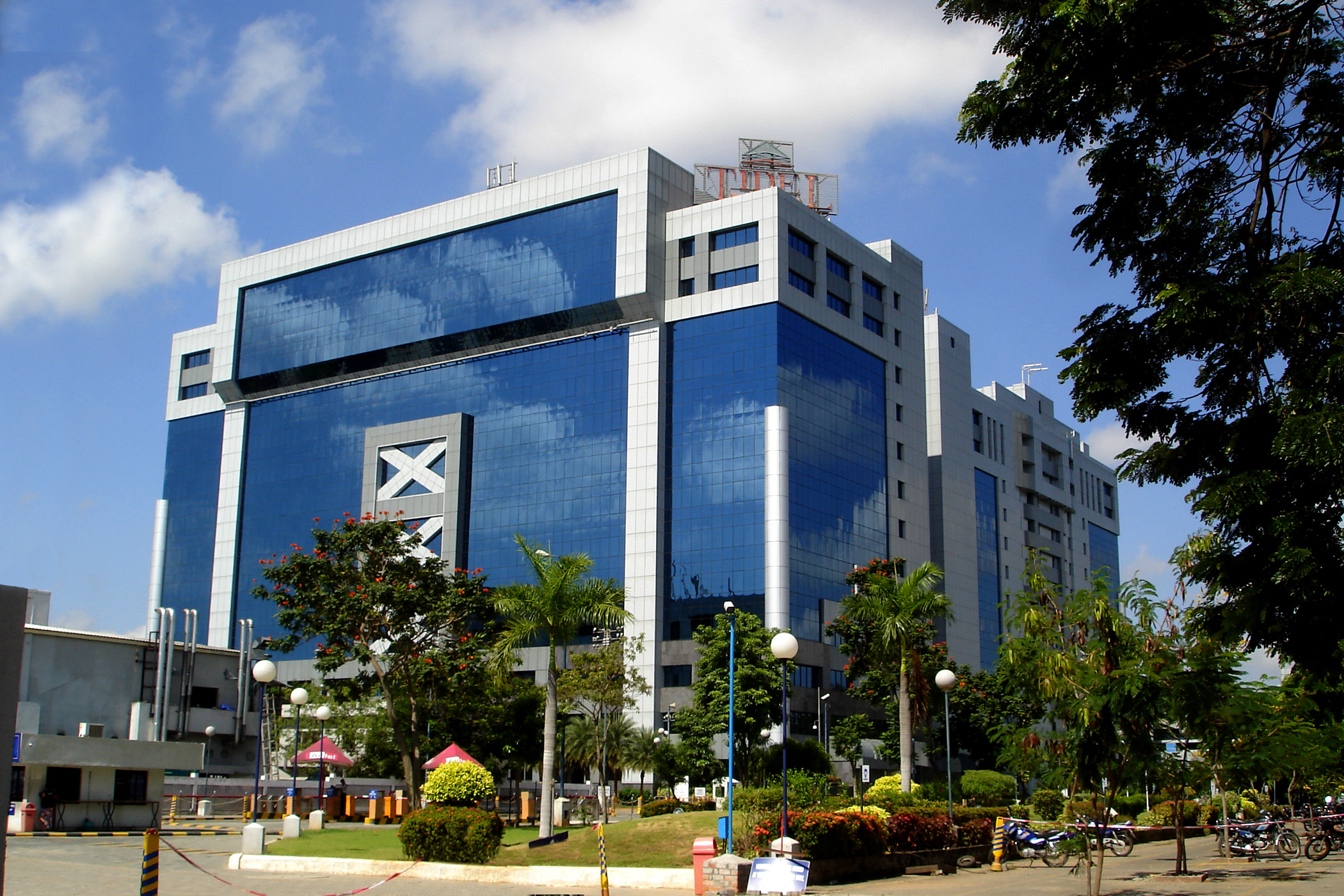
Tidel Park in Chennai was Asia's largest IT park when it was built in 2000.

Tamil Nadu's net state domestic product is the second largest economy in India. Tamil Nadu is the second largest state economy after Maharashtra with a gross state domestic product of ₹2,134,395 crore (equivalent to ₹25 trillion or US$260 billion in 2023). With GDP per capita of $3,000 it ranks fourth among Indian states. It is second most industrialized state in India next to Maharashtra. It ranks second in per capita income (2017–2018) among large states. It ranks third in foreign direct investment (FDI) approvals (cumulative 1991–2002) of ₹22,582.6 crore (US$2.3 billion), next only to Maharashtra (₹33,602.4 crore (US$3.5 billion)) and Delhi (₹30,303.8 crore (US$3.1 billion)). The State's investment constitutes 9.12% of the total FDI in the country. According to the 2001 Census, Tamil Nadu has the highest level of urbanisation (43.86%) in India, which accounts for 6% of India's total population and 9.6% of the urban population.

Chennai houses the automobile manufacturing giants in the country. More than 65% of heavy vehicles produced in the country, such as cars, buses, lorries, trains and bicycles, are produced in Chennai, and it is referred to as the Detroit of Asia. Coimbatore (also known as "Cotton City" and "Manchester of South India") in Tamil Nadu is the source of nearly 35% of India's yarn production from cotton. Arni is well known for raw silk production & India's largest raw silk export hub. Vellore is the largest hub for Leather processing. Erode is well known for its Turmeric and textile products. Tirupur is the largest producers of cotton vests and inners; it exports much of its production to South East Asia and European countries. Karur is the India's largest home textiles production & export hub. Gobichettipalayam is one of the largest producers of White silk with the country's first automatic silk reeling unit established here. Namakkal is one of the largest producers of poultry in the country.

Salem Steel Plant (SSP), a unit of Steel Authority of India Limited (SAIL), is a steel plant involved in the production of stainless steel. It is located along the Salem — Bengaluru National Highway 44 in the foothills of Kanjamalai in Salem district, Tamil Nadu, India. The plant has an installed capacity of 70,000 tonnes per annum in its cold rolling mill and 3,64,000 tonnes per annum in the hot rolling mill. It also has the country's first stainless steel blanking facility.

Tamil Nadu has most number of engineering Institutions in India. Chennai is referred as the Gateway of South India. Chennai is the second leading Software exporter in India. Companies such as Cognizant, Covansys, Xansa, Verizon, iSoft, Invensys, Schneider Electric and many others are Chennai based companies in India. Infosys has set up India's largest software development centre to house 25,000 software professionals at an estimated investment of Rs 12.50 billion (Rs 12.5 billion) in Chennai. Chennai has become the most preferred BPO hub in India and South Asia. Chennai is sometimes referred to as the Health Capital of India or the Banking Capital of India, having attracted investments from International corporations and the World Bank and it is called as Detroit of Asia.

Tamil Nadu has a network of about 110 industrial parks/estates that offer developed plots with supporting infrastructure. Also, the Government is promoting other industrial parks like Rubber Park, Apparel Parks, Floriculture Park, TICEL Park for Biotechnology, Siruseri IT Park, Agro Export Zones among others.

The heavy engineering manufacturing companies are centred around the suburbs of Chennai. Chennai boasts presence of global car manufacturing giants like Ford, Daimler, Hyundai, BMW, Mitsubishi, Komatsu, Yamaha, Nissan and Renault as well as home grown companies like MRF, JK Tyre, TI Cycles of India, Ashok Leyland TVS and Mahindra and Mahindra. Chennai is also home to Indian Institute of Technology, Madras. The Koyambedu Bus Stand (Asia's largest bus stand) operated by CMDA is the first bus stand in India to get the global positioning system which will use sensors to track vehicles on the move. Kalpakkam nuclear power plant, Neyveli Lignite Corporation, and the Narimanam natural gas plants provide sources of fuel and energy for the nation. 55% of electricity from wind power produced in India from wind mills comes from Tamil Nadu. The Kalpakkam Mini Reactor (Kamini) is the only U-233fueled operating reactor in the world.

Coimbatore, also known as the Manchester of South India, is one of the fast developing cities in India and the second largest city in Tamil Nadu. Coimbatore is also known for its textile factories, engineering firms, automobile parts manufacturers, health care facilities, educational institutions, wet grinders and water pumps. 76% of India's total textile market is from Erode (Loom City) and Tirupur (Textile City). It exports much of its production to South East Asian and European countries. Karur (Home Textile City) is the India's hub for home textiles production & export. It contributes over 60% of total production of India. Karur is also known for its bus bodybuilding (contributes 80% of South Indian bus body building). Karur TNPL is the Asia's largest eco friendly paper mill in production. Erode is also known as the Turmeric City, since it has the Asia's largest market for Turmeric. Gobichettipalayam is one of the largest producers of White silk with the country's first automatic silk reeling unit established here. Namakkal is one of the largest producers of poultry in the country. Salem is called as steel city and has many sago producing units, mineral wealth. Sivakasi is the leader in printing, fireworks, safety matches production in India. It contributes 80% of India's total safety matches production and 90% of India's total fireworks production. Thoothukudi is the gateway of Tamil Nadu. it is a major chemical producer only next to chennai. As of 1980's Asia's largest chemical industry DCW Ltd, is situated in the district. And many more chemical industries such as SPIC, Sterlite copper, VV Titanium pigments, Tuticorin Alkali Chemicals, HWP-Tuticorin, Ferron Steels, etc.

Biovalleys in Tamil Nadu include Biotechnology Incubator Park Near Chennai, Women's Biotechnology Park Kelambakkam, Medicinal Plants Biotechnology Park, Madurai, Marine Biotechnology Park, Mandapam and Bioinformatics and Genomics Centre (BGC), Chennai.

Tiruchirappalli is a major engineering equipment manufacturing hub in Tamil Nadu. It also home to National Institute of Technology, Tiruchirappalli, a premier technical university of India. The Golden Rock Railway Workshop, moved to Tiruchirappalli from Nagapattinam in 1928, is one of the three railway workshop–cum–production unit in Tamil Nadu. The workshops produced 650 conventional and low-container flat wagons during the year 2007–08.

== Telangana ==
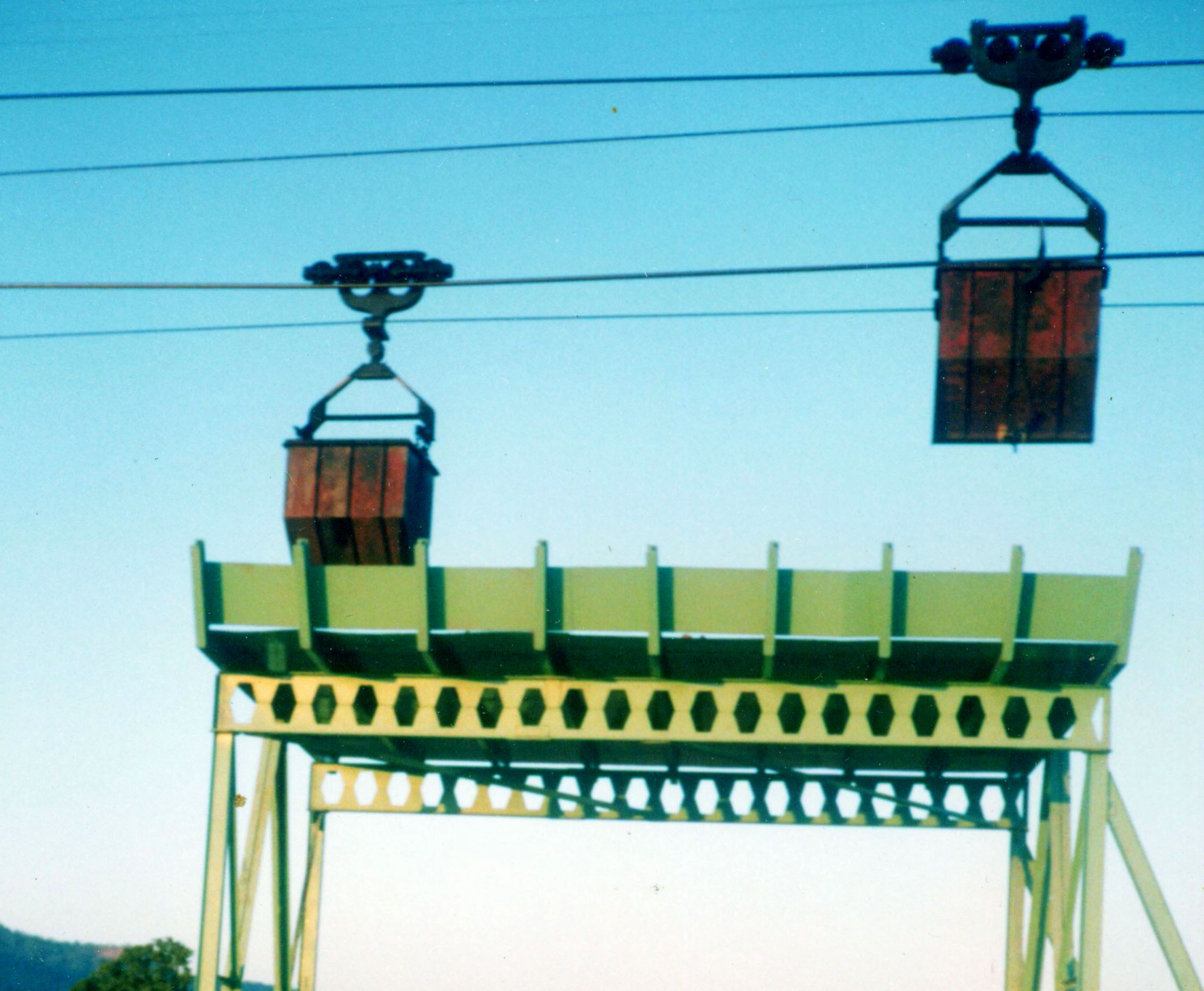
Coal Handling Ropeway at Aswapuram, Khammam district

Telangana is a state in India having an average annual growth rate of 13.90% over 2014-2019. Telangana's nominal gross state domestic product for the year 2023-24 stands at ₹15.2 lakh crore (US$180 billion). Service sector is the largest contributor to Telangana's economy with a share of about 65% in the year 2018-19. Growth in services has largely been fuelled by IT services with the State holding leading position in IT & ITeS in the country in terms of production and exports.

Around 54% of GDP comes from the Greater Hyderabad Metropolitan Region. Agriculture also form a backbone of Telangana's Economy. Two important rivers of India, the Godavari and Krishna, flow through the state, providing irrigation. Farmers in Telangana mainly depend on rain-fed water sources for irrigation. Rice is the major food crop. Other important local crops are cotton, sugar cane, mango and tobacco. Recently, crops used for vegetable oil production, such as sunflower and peanuts, have gained favour. There are many multi-state irrigation projects in development, including Godavari River Basin Irrigation Projects.

The state has also started to focus on the fields of information technology and biotechnology. There are 68 Special Economic Zones in the state.

Telangana is a mineral-rich state, with coal reserves at Singareni Coal mines.

== See also ==
- Economy of Tamil Nadu
- Economy of Telangana
- Economy of Andhra Pradesh
- Economy of Kerala
- Economy of Karnataka
- Economy of India
