= Panambur =

- Locality
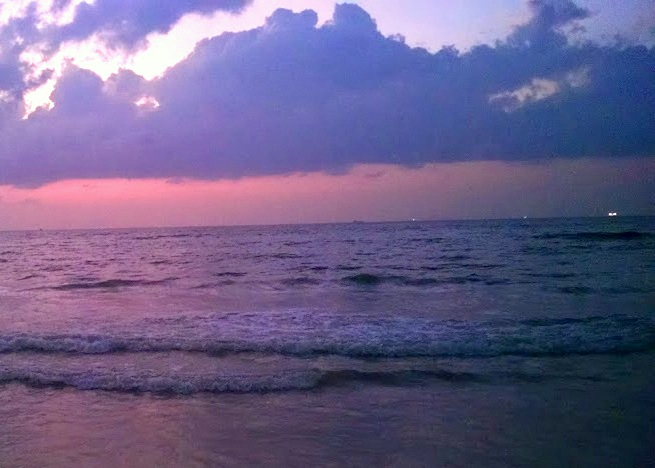
- Panambur beach

- Location in Karnataka, India
- Coordinates: 12.929°N 74.822°E
- Country: India
- State: Karnataka
- Region: Tulunadu
- District: Dakshina Kannada
- City: Mangalore

Government
  - Body: Mangalore City Corporation

Languages
  - Official: Kannada
- Time zone: UTC+5:30 (IST)
- Telephone code: 0824
- Vehicle registration: KA 19
- Lok Sabha constituency: Dakshina Kannada
- Vidhan Sabha constituency: Mangalore City North
- Civic agency: Mangalore City Corporation

Panambur is one of the localities in Mangalore famous as a tourist spot. It is also a major industrial area and New Mangalore Port, Karnataka's main port is located here. Major industrial plants, such as Mangalore Chemicals & Fertilizers and KIOCL, are located here. Panambur lies north of the Gurupura River's confluence with the Arabian Sea about 10 kilometres (6.2 mi) north of Mangalore city centre, Dakshina Kannada (formerly South Canara) district of Karnataka state, India. Panambur along with Baikampady and Jokatte are the main industrial areas of Mangalore and one of the major industrial areas of Karnataka.

== Etymology ==
The name Panambur is derived from Panam which means "money" and Ur which means "place" or "village" in Tulu language.

== Location ==
Panambur beach is 10 km (6.2 mi) north of Mangalore city and near the harbour at Panambur. It is the most popular, well connected and most visited beach of coastal Karnataka. It has many eateries, lifeguards, boat rides, etc. Beach festivals are occasionally organized here.

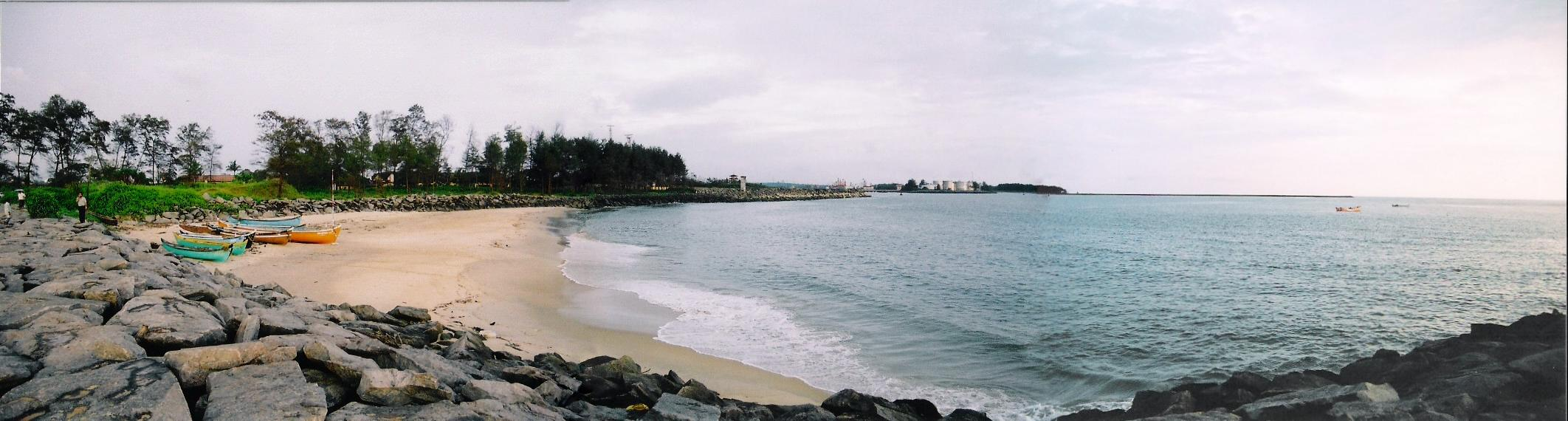
Sea entrance to Mangalore Harbour

There is a Nandaneshwara temple in Panambur. The sea port is near to Surathkal railway station on the Mumbai-Mangalore railway route.

Many small, medium and large scale industries are located at Panambur including Mangalore Chemicals and Fertilizers and Kudremukh Iron Ore Company Limited.

== New Mangalore Port Authority ==
New Mangalore Port is a deep-water, all-weather port at Panambur, which is the deepest inner harbour on the west coast and the only major port of Karnataka and is currently the seventh largest port in India. It is referred as 'Gateway of Karnataka'

== See also ==
- Panambur Beach
- Surathkal
- Economy of Mangalore
