= Surathkal =

Surathkal ಸುರತ್ಕಲ್
- Neighbourhood/Suburb
- Surathkal Railway Station

- Location in Karnataka, India
- Coordinates: 12°58′10″N 74°46′45″E
- Country: India
- State: Karnataka
- District: Dakshina Kannada
- City: Mangaluru
- Region: Tulu Nadu
- Elevation: 24 m (79 ft)

Population
  - Total: 61,259

Languages
  - Official: Kannada
  - Regional: Kannada, Tulu, Beary, Konkani
- Time zone: UTC+5:30 (IST)
- PIN: 575014
- Telephone code: 0824

Surathkal(kn:ಸುರತ್ಕಲ್)" is an area (locality) within the city of Mangaluru. It is a municipality merged with Mangaluru City Corporation. It lies between Gurupura (Phalguni) and Pavanje (Nandini) rivers. It is the northern suburb and can be considered as the northernmost area of Mangaluru until Mukka. Surathkal has a railway station on Konkan railway route which connects cities of Mumbai to Mangaluru. Surathkal is 8 km north of New Mangalore seaport, 4 km west of Mangalore Refinery and Petrochemicals Limited and 16 km west of Mangalore International Airport This region has developed educationally, industrially and commercially can be regarded as one of the crucial localities in Mangaluru and coastal Karnataka. The only NIT of Karnataka is situated here which is adjacent to the national highway NH 66. Mukka a popular name in Indian surfing is also situated close to Surathkal. Surathkal beach is well known for its cleanliness and well maintained like other beaches in Mangaluru.

== Etymology ==
According to legend, the name Surathkal is derived from "shiradakal" meaning "headstone" in both Kannada and Tulu. The famous Sadashiva Mahaganapathi temple on the shores of Arabian Sea (Lakshadweepa Samudra) is said to be built around the linga that a Rakshasa by name Kharasura carried on his head. Another legend is that when Ravana threw in fit of rage the atma shivalinga, some of the pieces from shivalinga fell at place where Sadashiva temple is situated at present. Noted historian Padoor Gururaj Bhat is of opinion the temple might have been constructed around 11 C.E. (11 A.D).

== Administration ==
Surathkal was once a Grama panchayat, then town panchayat, municipality vide Government notification No.S.O. 2658 dated 31 December 1974 now merged with Mangalore City Corporation.Zonal office of Mangaluru City Corporation was opened on 6 March 2017 at Surathkal (Zone 1) which covers Surathkal (West), Surathkal (East), Katipalla (West), Katipalla-Krishnapura, Katipalla (North), Idya (East), Idya (West), Hosabettu, Kulai, Baikampady, Panambur and Bengre wards of MCC. Surathkal was once a separate constituency of Karnataka Legislative Assembly.The Suratkal legislative assembly constituency was part of Udupi (Lok Sabha constituency) till the year 2009. Now it has been renamed as Mangalore City North (Vidhan Sabha constituency) after change in its geographical limits and it comes under Dakshina Kannada (Lok Sabha constituency) at present.

Surathkal is Hobli under Mangaluru taluk as per Karnataka state Revenue Department. It has "Nada Katcheri" near Suratkal market which provides property details and other matters related to Revenue department. Surathkal Police station comes under the jurisdiction of Commissioner of Mangaluru city police.

Junction of NH-17 and Bajpe road at Suratkal

There is Veterinary Hospital run by Karnataka state government at Suratkal. Surathkal has post office operated and maintained by postal department, Government of India, with Postal index number code (Pincode) 575014.

== Education ==
Surathkal is home to one of India's premier technical institutes - The National Institute of Technology Karnataka (NITK), formerly known as Karnataka Regional Engineering College (KREC). Surathkal also houses Vidyadayanee High School and Govindadasa College run by Hindu Vidyadayanee Sangha, Surathkal. Other notable educational institutes include Sri Mahalingeshwara English Medium school, NITK English Medium School, Holy Family School and Anjuman English Medium High School, Mukka. The Srinivas Institute of Medical Science and Research Centre's Hospital is located at Srinivasnagar, Mukka, Surathkal.

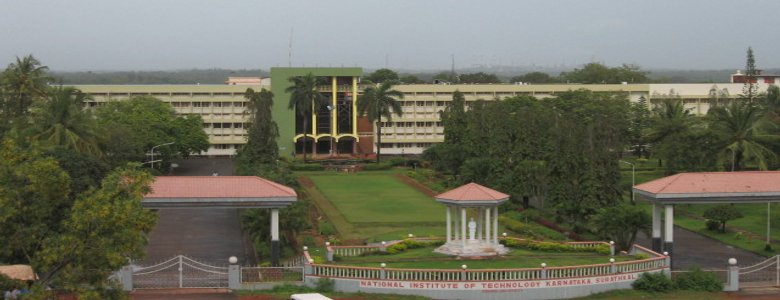
NITK Surathkal

== Travel ==
National Highway 66 ( previously NH 17) passes through Surathkal Surathkal can be easily accessed by various bus services from State Bank by both city buses and the Mangalore-Udupi Express buses. The nearest airport is Mangalore International Airport (Bajpe), 16 kilometres from Surathkal that connects Mangalore with major cities in southern and western India as well as many major cities in the Middle East, with direct flights available to Dubai, Doha, Muscat and Abu Dhabi. Surathkal railway station, which is located 2 km away from the National Institute of Technology campus and half kilometre from national highway NH-66 falls on the famed Konkan railway route on which Rajdhani, Duronto, and other express trains ply regularly from Mangaluru to Mumbai, Thane, Ernakulam, Gujarat and New Delhi. The nearest metropolitan cities, Mumbai and Chennai, are 16 hours away by train. The New Mangalore Sea Port (NMPT) is situated 8 km away from this town on the Arabian Sea and primarily used for importing and exporting goods all over the world.

== Places of interest ==
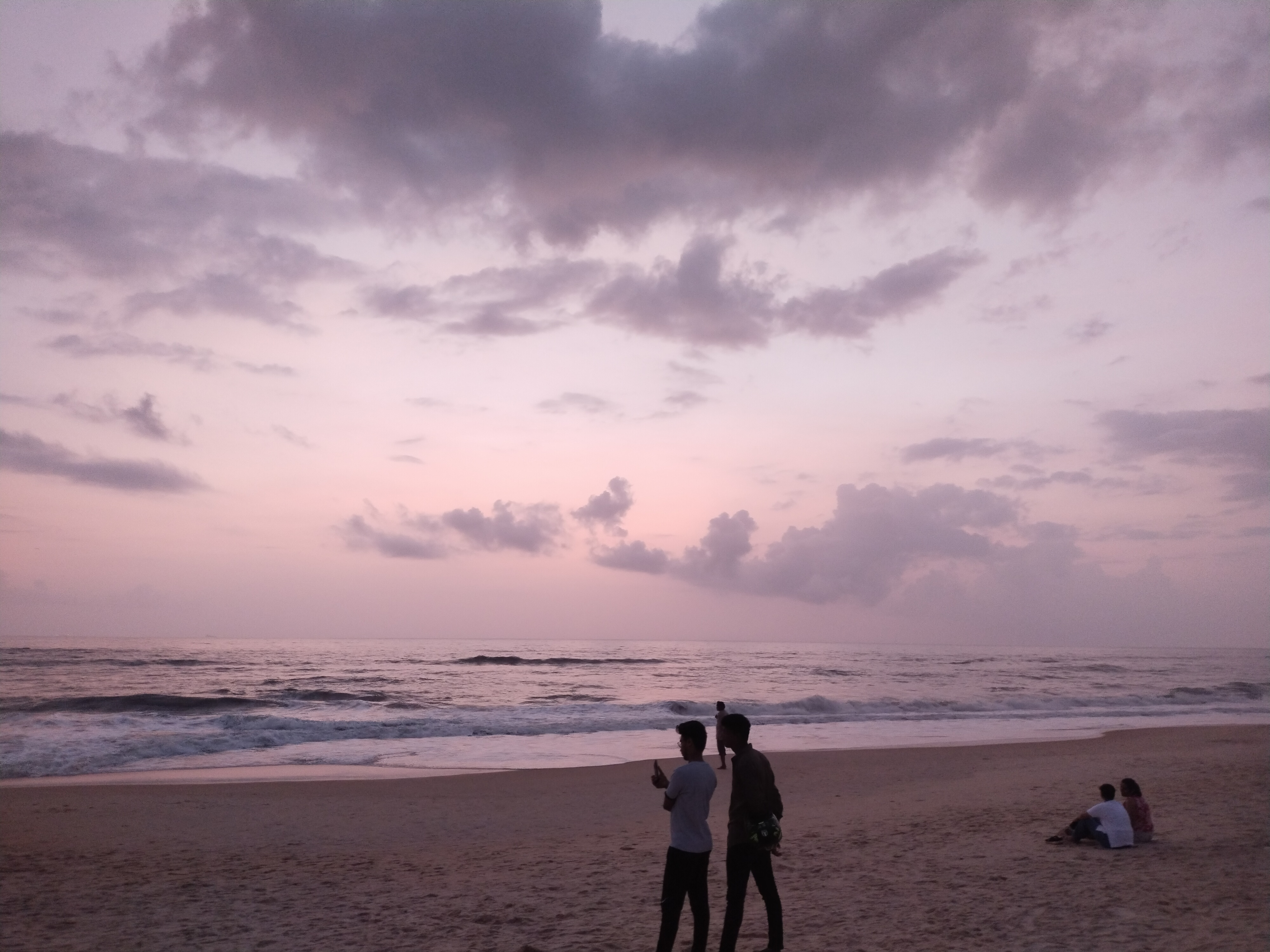
Sunset at Surathkal Beach

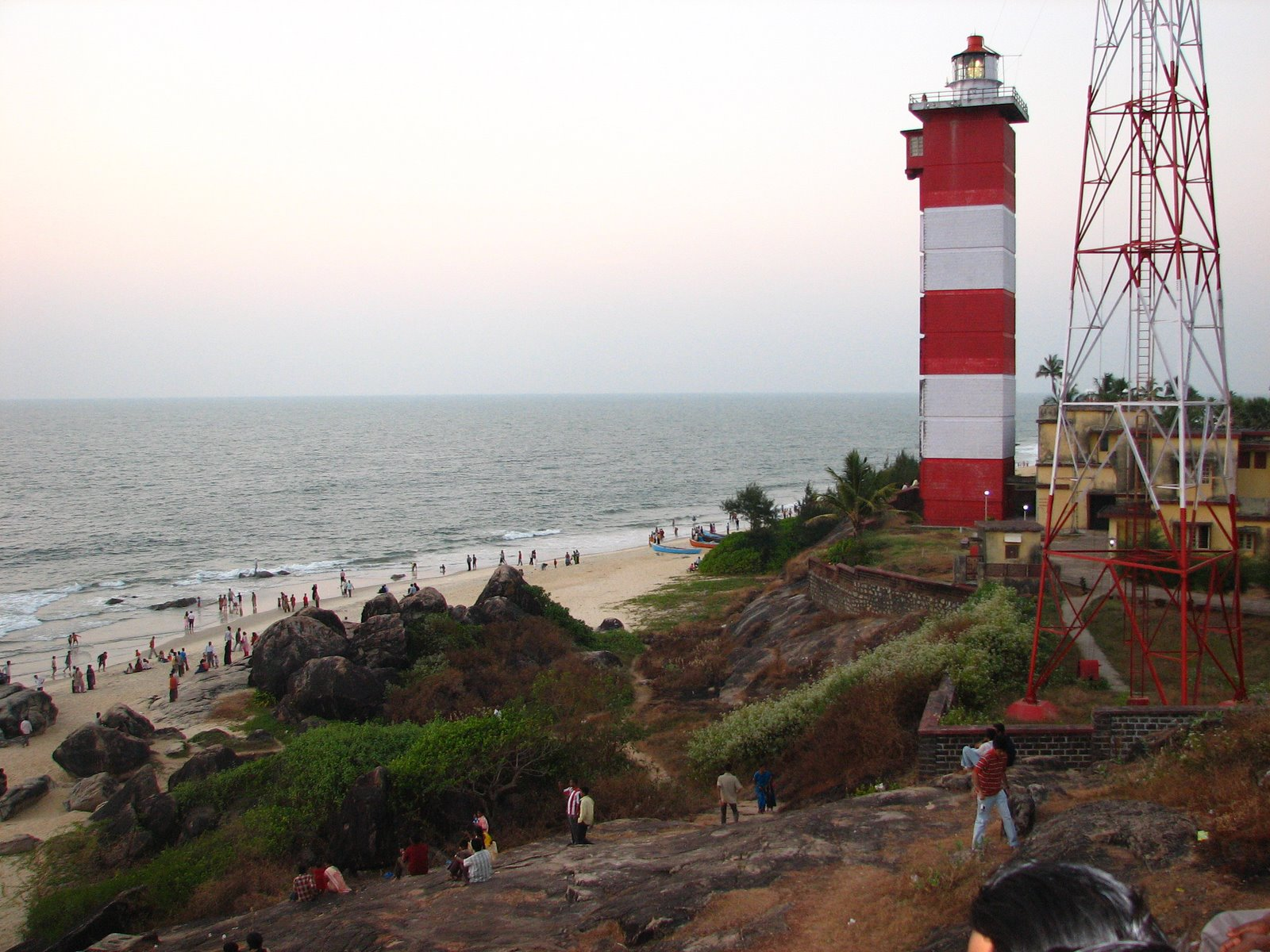
Lighthouse, alongside Surathkal Beach

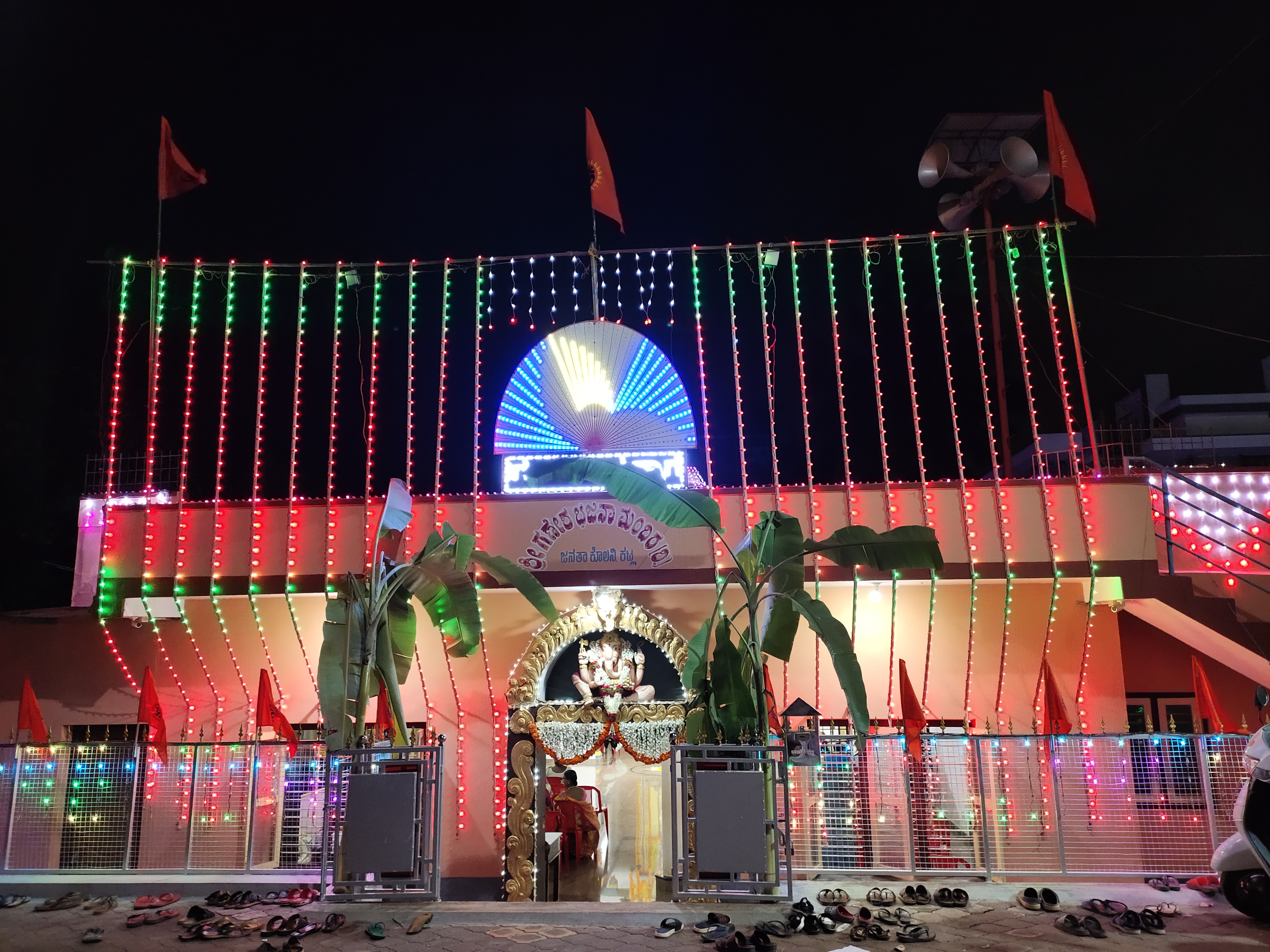
Shri Ganesha Bhajana Mandira (R.) at Janatha Colony, Surathkal

- Surathkal Beach There is a lighthouse at Surathkal Beach which was commissioned in 1972.
- National Institute of Technology Karnataka
- NITK Beach
- Surathkal Lighthouse
- Krishnapura matha
- Shri Sadashiva Mahaganapati Temple
- Iddya Shri Mahalingeshwara Temple
- Padre Shree Dhoomavati Temple, Padre
- Shri Ganesha Bhajana Mandira (R.) Janatha Colony

== Geography ==
Surathkal is located at 12°58'60 N 74° 46' 60E. The maximum and minimum temperature in a year varies between 37 °C and 25 °C. But ambient temperature occasionally touches 40 °C during summer season (usually March, April, May)

== Industry ==
Some of the major industries in and around Surathkal are:

- Mangalore Refinery and Petrochemicals Limited (MRPL),
- BASF (German chemical company) and
- Mangalore Chemicals and Fertilizers (MCF).

The Baikampady Industrial Estate is located at around 6 kilometres from Surathkal and houses many small and medium-sized industries. The raw materials for these industries are imported through the NMPT and goods produced here are transported to several places in India and exported abroad through this port.

== See also ==
- NITK Surathkal
- NITK Beach
- Sasihithlu beach
- Panambur beach
- New Mangalore Port Trust (NMPT)
