= MCF Workers' Union =

The MCF Workers' Union is a trade union at the Mangalore Chemicals and Fertilisers, in Karnataka, India. MCFWU is affiliated to Indian National Trade Union Congress. As of 2001 MCFWU was the majority union at MCF. In 1995 MCFWU was invited, for first time, to discussions on reconstruction of the company.

MCFWU participated in agitations against the closure of the Kudremukh Iron Ore Company.
