= Campco =

Agricultural cooperative in India

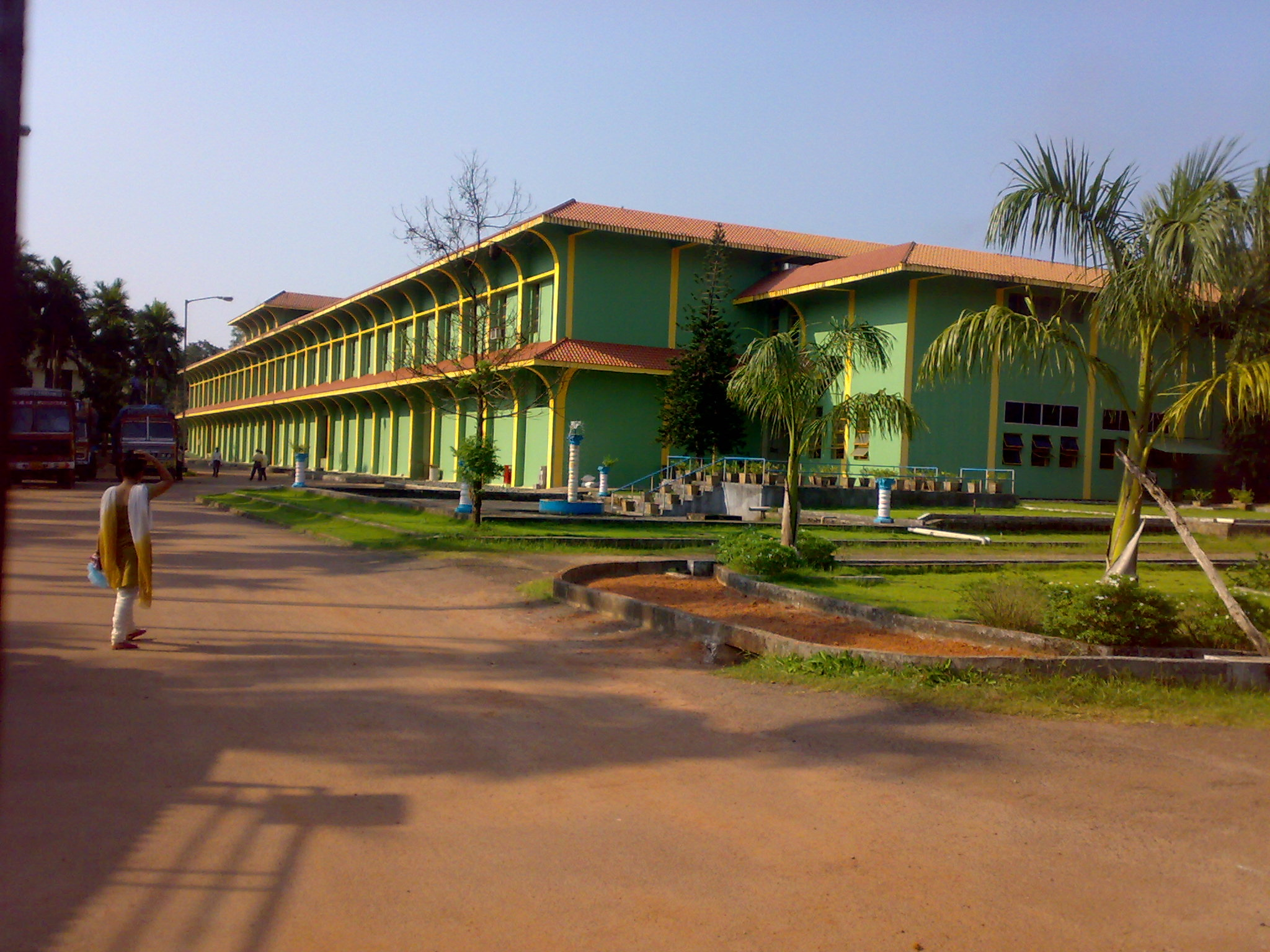
Campco Puttur

Central Arecanut and Cocoa Marketing and Processing Co-operative Limited (CAMPCO) is a company that procures, markets, sells and processes areca nut and cocoa and provides guidance to farmers in India. It has entered the rubber and black pepper market. It has its head office at Mangalore, Karnataka and has branches throughout India.

== History ==
CAMPCO was founded on 11 July 1973 at Mangalore by Varanashi Subraya Bhat as a co-operative to mitigate the sufferings of arecanut and cocoa growers in the Indian states of Karnataka and Kerala. It extended its services to Gujarat, Maharashtra, Uttar Pradesh, Madhya Pradesh, New Delhi, Bihar, Tamil Nadu, Odisha, Assam and Goa. It became a multi state co-operative under the relevant Indian laws.

It established a chocolate manufacturing plant in 1986 at Puttur in the Dakshina Kannada district of Karnataka. The Campco chocolate manufacturing unit was inaugurated on 1 September 1986 by then President of India, Giani Zail Singh. The inauguration ceremony was broadcast live on Doordarshan. The plant produces chocolates and other products of cocoa both under its own brand and also for Nestle. In 2016 total production was 18,000 tonnes per annum, with a planned expansion to increase the output to 23,000 tonnes. A similar expansion had also been planned in 2011.

The turnover of Campco was a record high of Rs 17400 Million in FY2017-18.

The CAMPCO chocolate factory's new amenity block was inaugurated by Union Minister for Commerce and Industry Suresh Prabhu on 21 January 2018. On the same day, a statue of the company's founder and president, Varanashi Subraya Bhat, was unveiled. The factory also has office facilities and a production area. According to the company, its facilities comply with applicable food safety and quality standards.

The new warehouse infrastructure, will be setting up a godown at Kavu village in Puttur taluk of Dakshina Kannada district. It is 17 km from Puttur City.

== See also ==
- Economy of Mangalore
- Baikampady
