= Panambur Beach =

- Beach
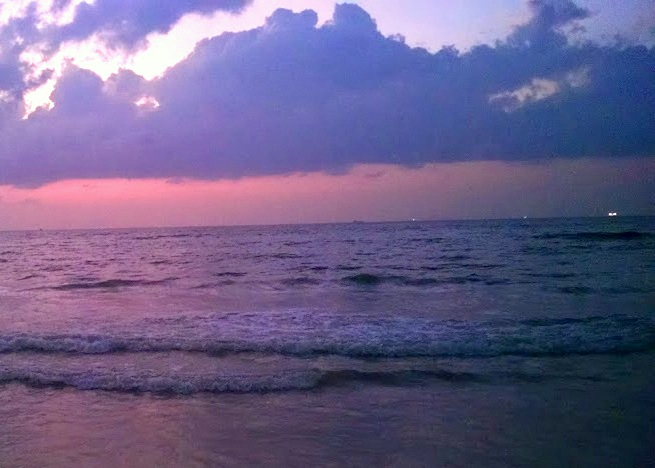
- Clouds over the sea at Panambur Beach
- Location: Panambur
- City: Mangaluru
- Country: India
- District: Dakshina Kannada
- Lifeguard Available: Yes
- Important Events: Beach Festival; Kite Festival
- Activities: Swimming; Parasailing; Boat rides; Surfing; Water Scooters; Camel Rides; Horse Riding; AT Buggy; Dolphin Safari

Government
  - Body: Mangaluru City Corporation

Panambur Beach is a beach on the shores of the Arabian Sea in the city of Mangaluru in the Indian state of Karnataka.

It is the most visited beach in Mangalore city (now, Mangaluru).

Panambur beach is about 10 km (6.2 mi) north of Mangalore city center and comes under the administration of Mangaluru City Corporation. It is maintained by a private enterprise under the banner of Panambur Beach Tourism Development Project.

Attractions include jet ski rides, boating, dolphin viewing, food stalls and beach festivals. Trained lifeguards patrol the beach to ensure visitor safety.

This beach is popular for its sunsets, the port area and picnic spot. The ships anchored out in the sea waiting for berth in the harbor can be seen from the beach.

== The Breakwater ==
Panambur beach is beside the New Mangalore Sea Port. The rock wall forms the northern breakwater of the sea port entrance and protects vessels at anchorage from the weather and longshore drift. Walking on the breakwater rocks is forbidden. The port has to abide by International Ship and Port Facility Security (ISPS) Code and keep the breakwater free of people.

== Facilities ==
The beach has activities like jet skiing, boating, chariot, camel and horse rides. There are many food stalls. Children can be entertained by joy riders that are plenty in number. The beach warms up during the carnivals. Parking facility can be utilised by visitors for two wheelers and four wheelers by paying a parking fee.

== Events ==
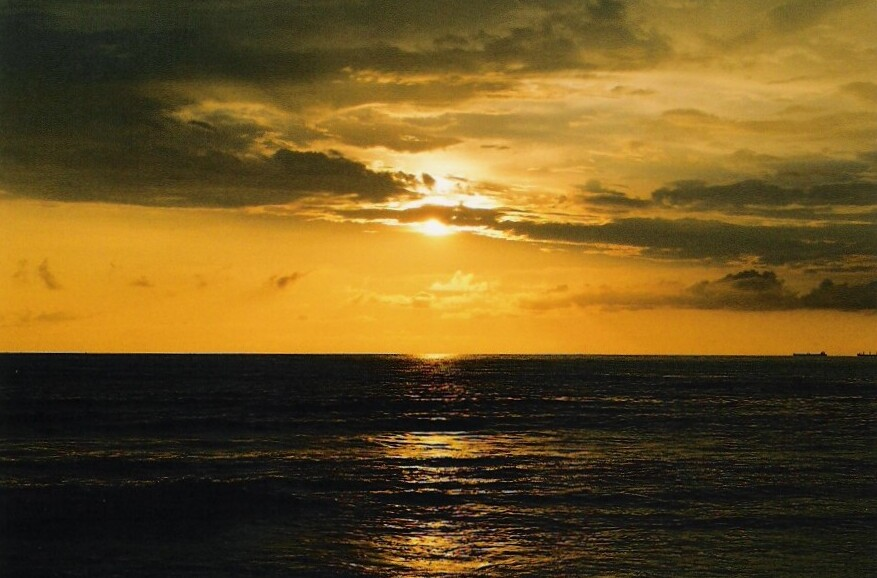
Sunset at Panambur beach

Events such as beach festivals and kite festivals are occasionally organized here. Other events include boat races, air shows and sand sculpture contests.

=== Kite festival ===
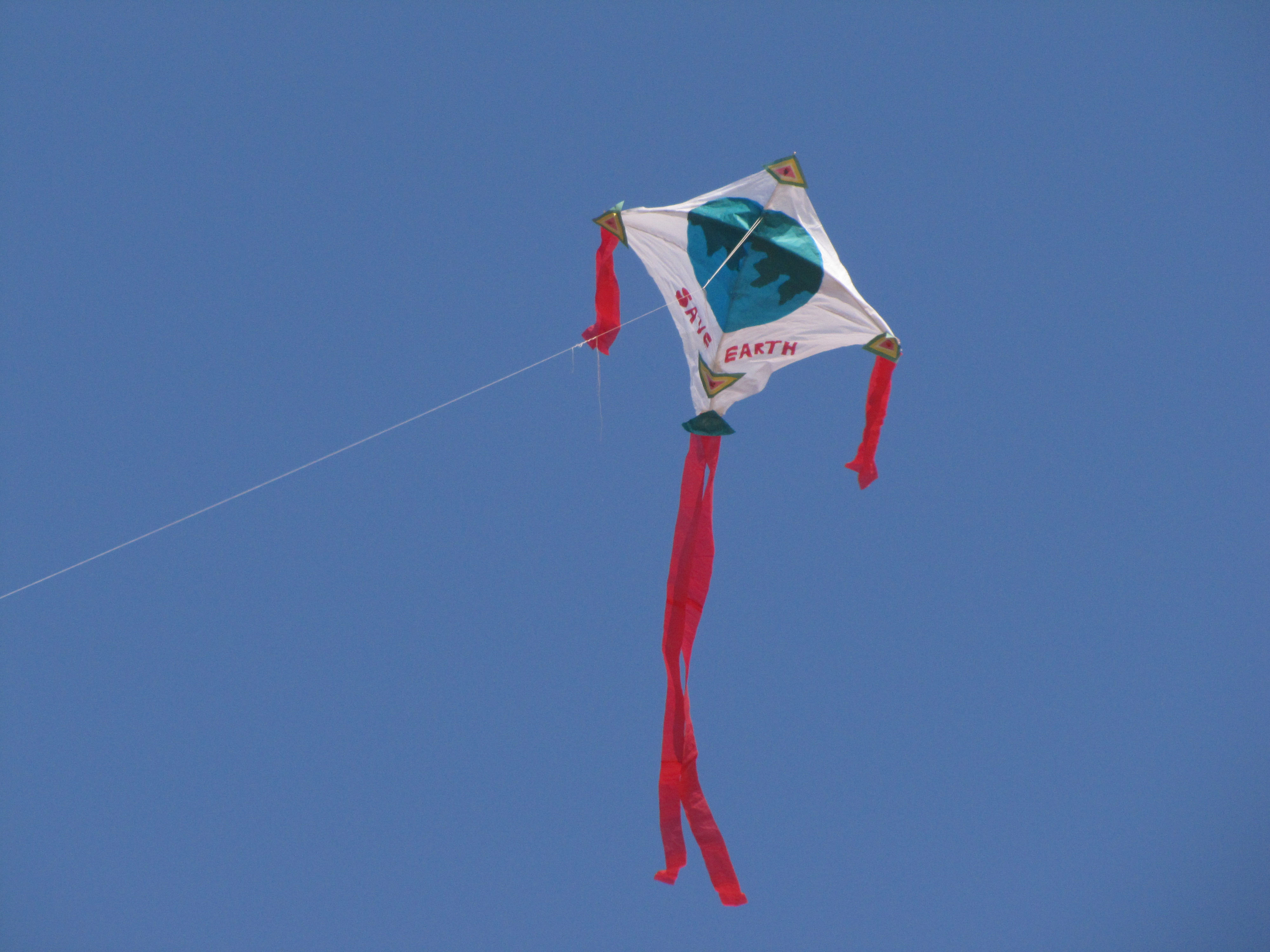
Kite at Panambur beach

The International Kite festival is one of the major tourist attraction of this beach, where teams from around the world along with the kite enthusiasts participate in the festival. Teams from various countries such as England, France, Netherlands, Germany, Kuwait, Thailand, Australia, Singapore and Turkey have actively participated in the past. Kite enthusiasts under the name "Team Mangalore" have always been hosting Kite Festivals in this beach with the support of industrial giants such as ONGC, MRPL.

=== Beach festival ===
The district administration of Dakshina Kannada organises the beach festival as part of the famous "Karavali Utsav" which translates to Coastal festival. It is said that approximately 2.5 lakh attend the beach festival. Several stalls will be put up for the public. Entertainment and stage programmes are held across three days and include dance and singing competitions.

== Accessibility ==
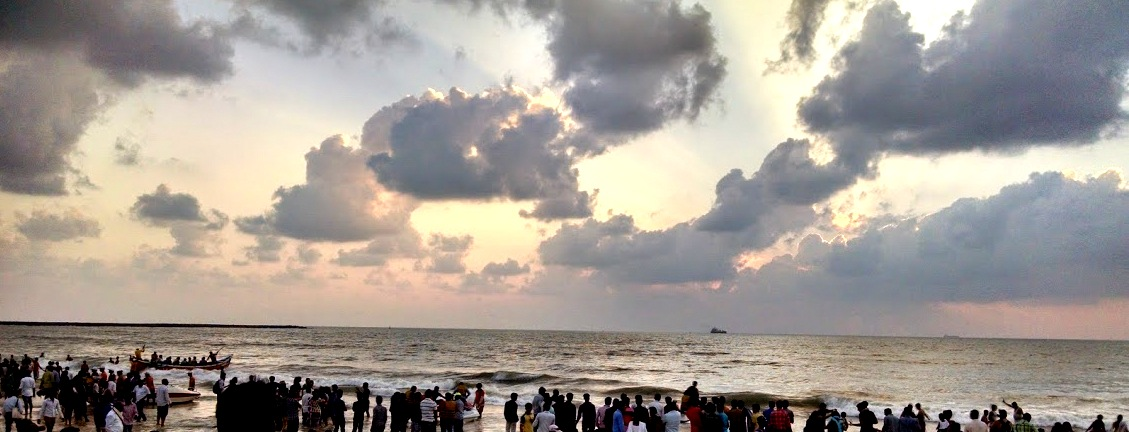
Clouds over the beach

Panambur Beach is well connected by public transport. There are several city buses from the main bus stop in Statebank. One can also take the non-express service buses that give a stop for Panambur Beach right at the Panambur Beach road joining national highway NH-66 (older number: NH17). Once off the bus, one can take a small walk down the road leading to the beach.

Distance from:

- New Mangalore Port- 4 km
- National Institute of Technology Karnataka - 8 km
- Tannirbhavi Beach 9 km
- Pumpwell - 13 km
- Pilikula Nisargadhama - 16 km
- Sasihithlu Beach - 23 km
- Infosys DC, Mudipu - 32 km
- Manipal - 56 km
- Dharmasthala - 81 km
- Kukke Subramanya Temple - 110 km
- Kannur, Kerala - 149 km
- Murdeshwar - 151 km
- Gokarna - 226 km
- Mysore - 261 km
- Hubli - 353 km
- Bangalore - 356 km
- Panaji, Goa - 360 km

Nearest Railway Stations:

- Surathkal railway station - 6 km
- Mangalore Central railway station - 14 km
- Mangalore Junction railway station - 15 km

Nearest Airport:

- Mangalore International Airport (India) - 14 km

== Climate ==
Mangaluru has a tropical monsoon climate and is under the direct influence of the Arabian Sea branch of the southwest monsoon.

It's prohibited from water sports during monsoon season.

== Gallery ==
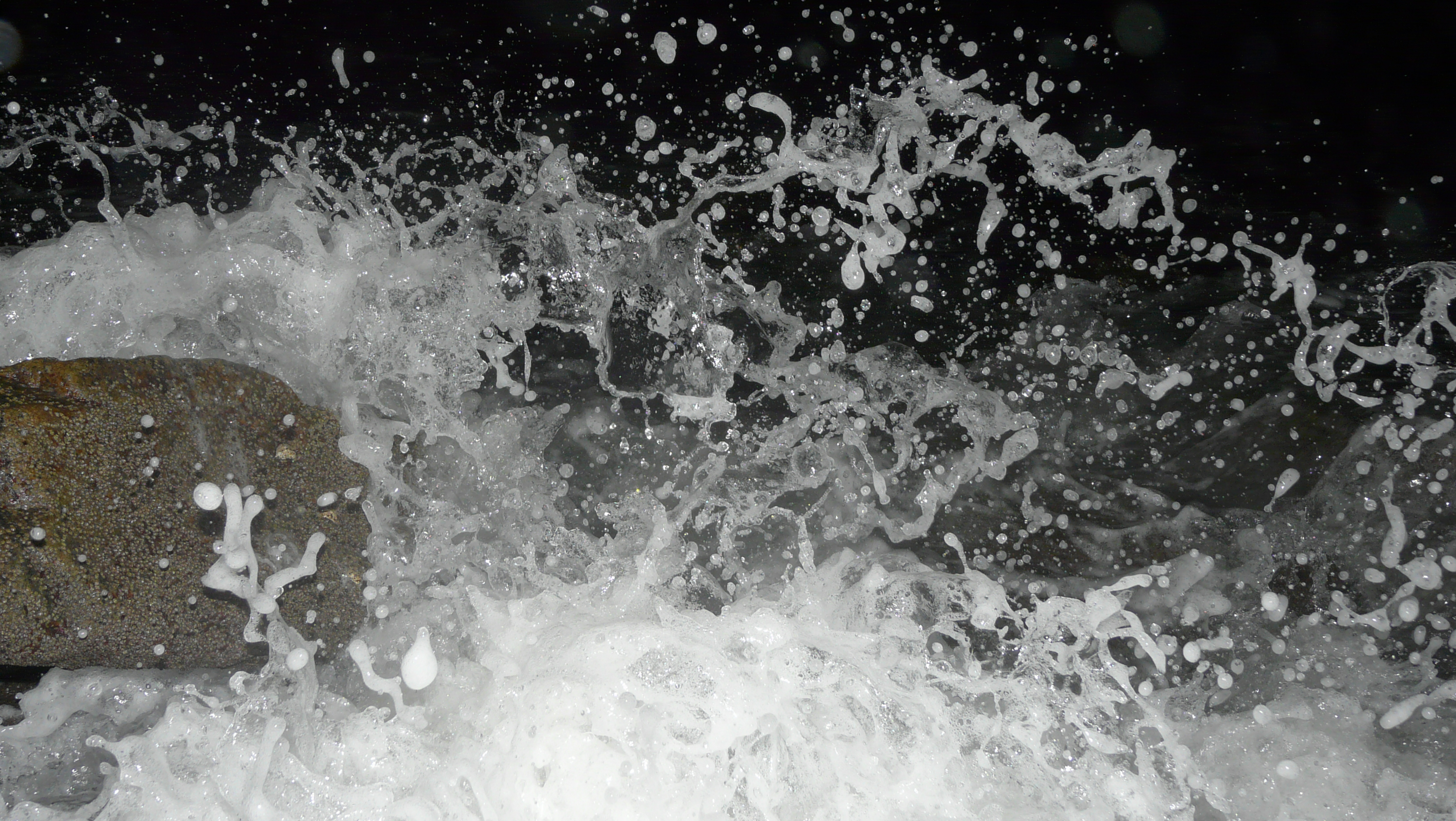

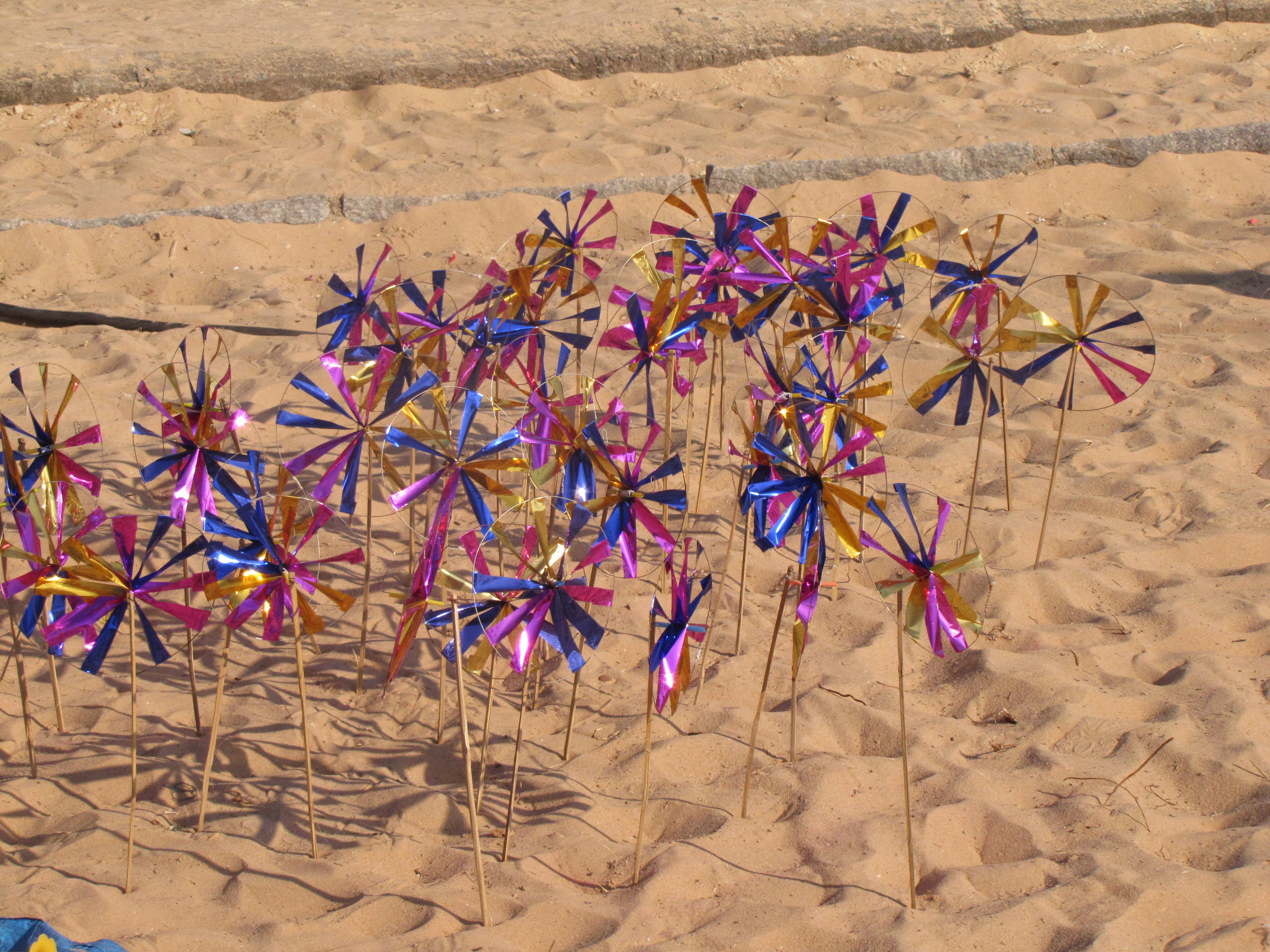

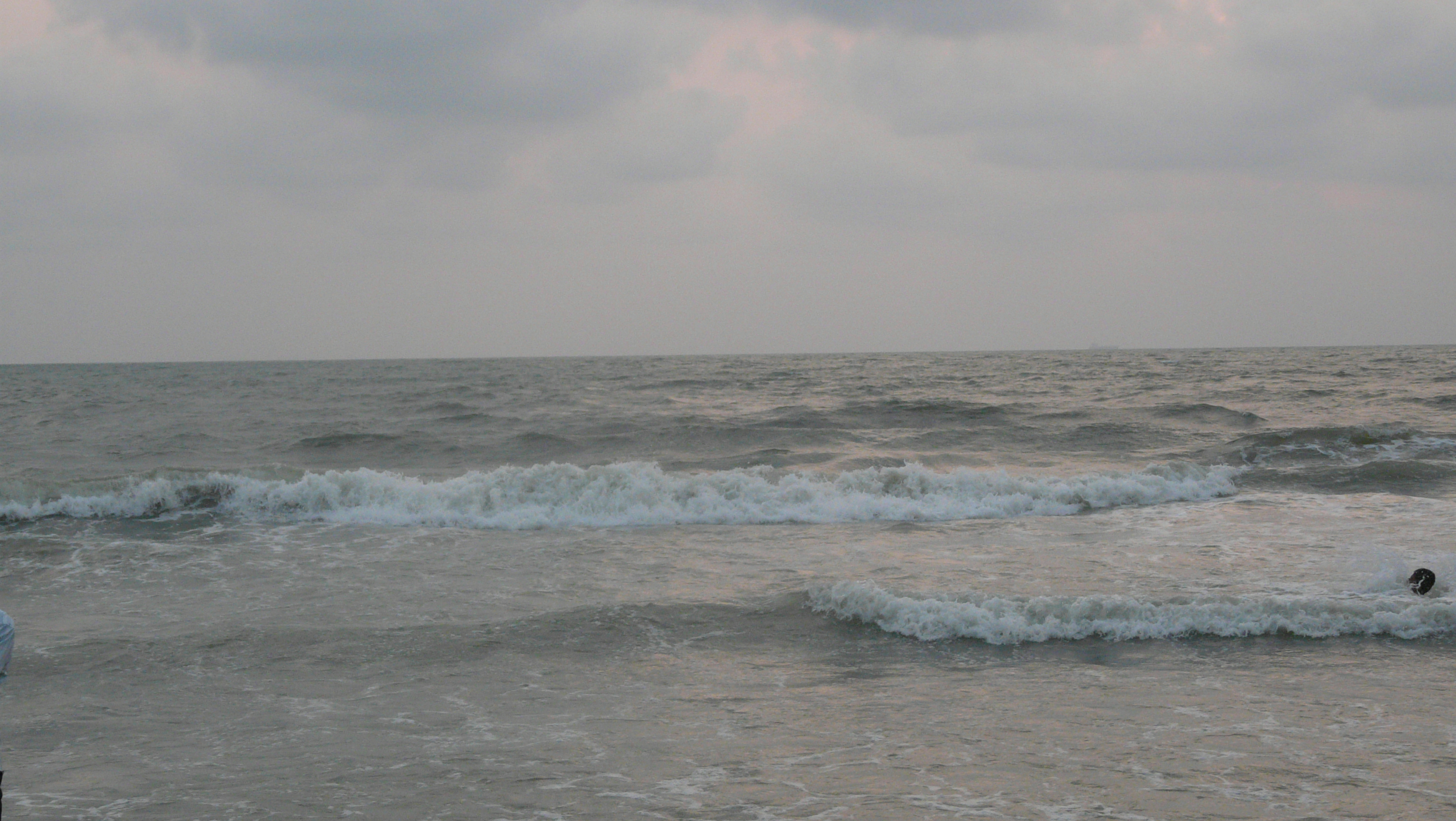

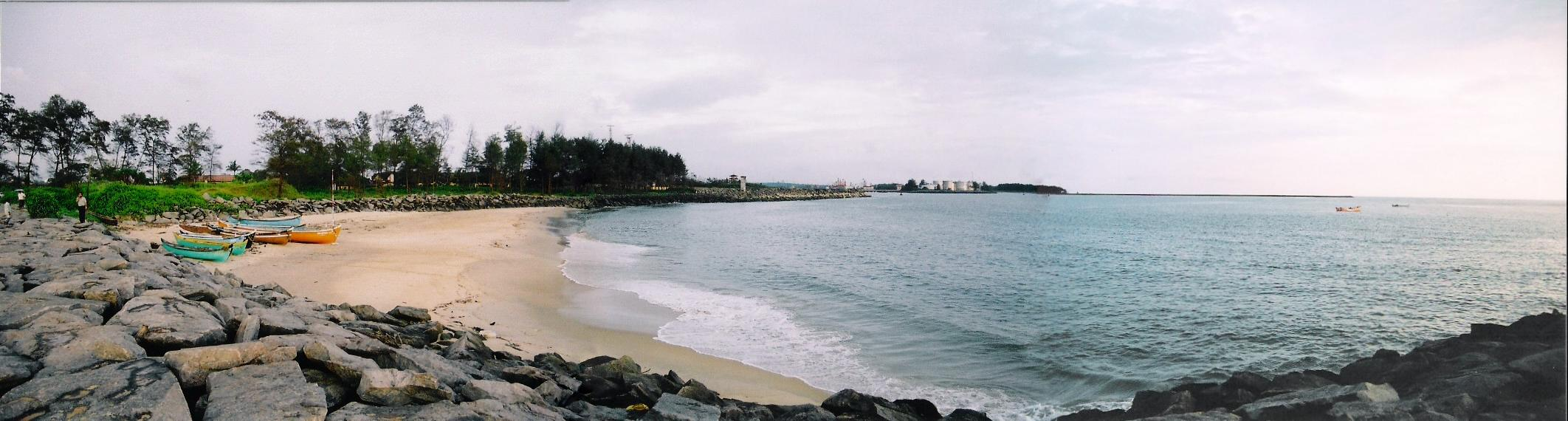

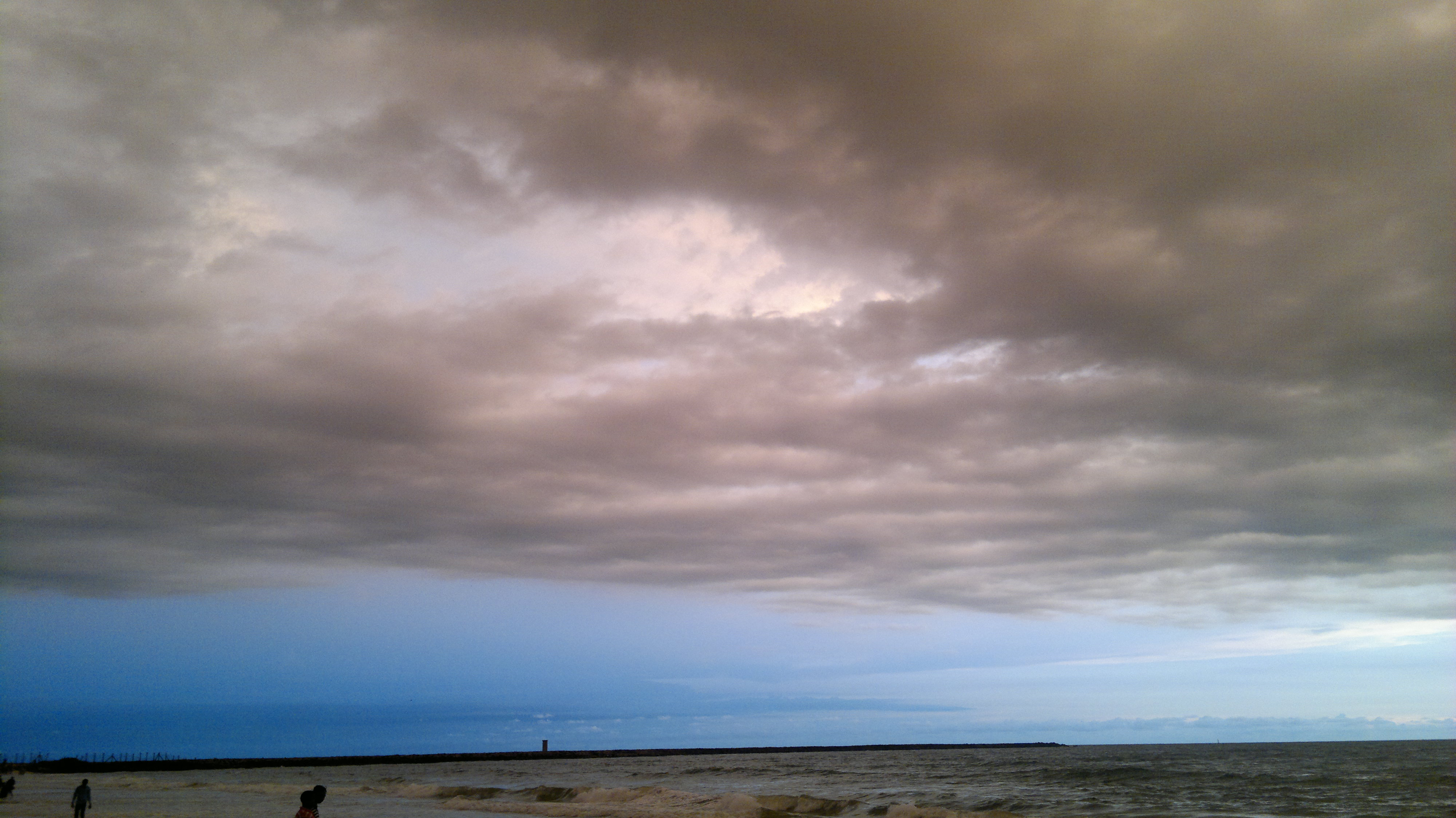

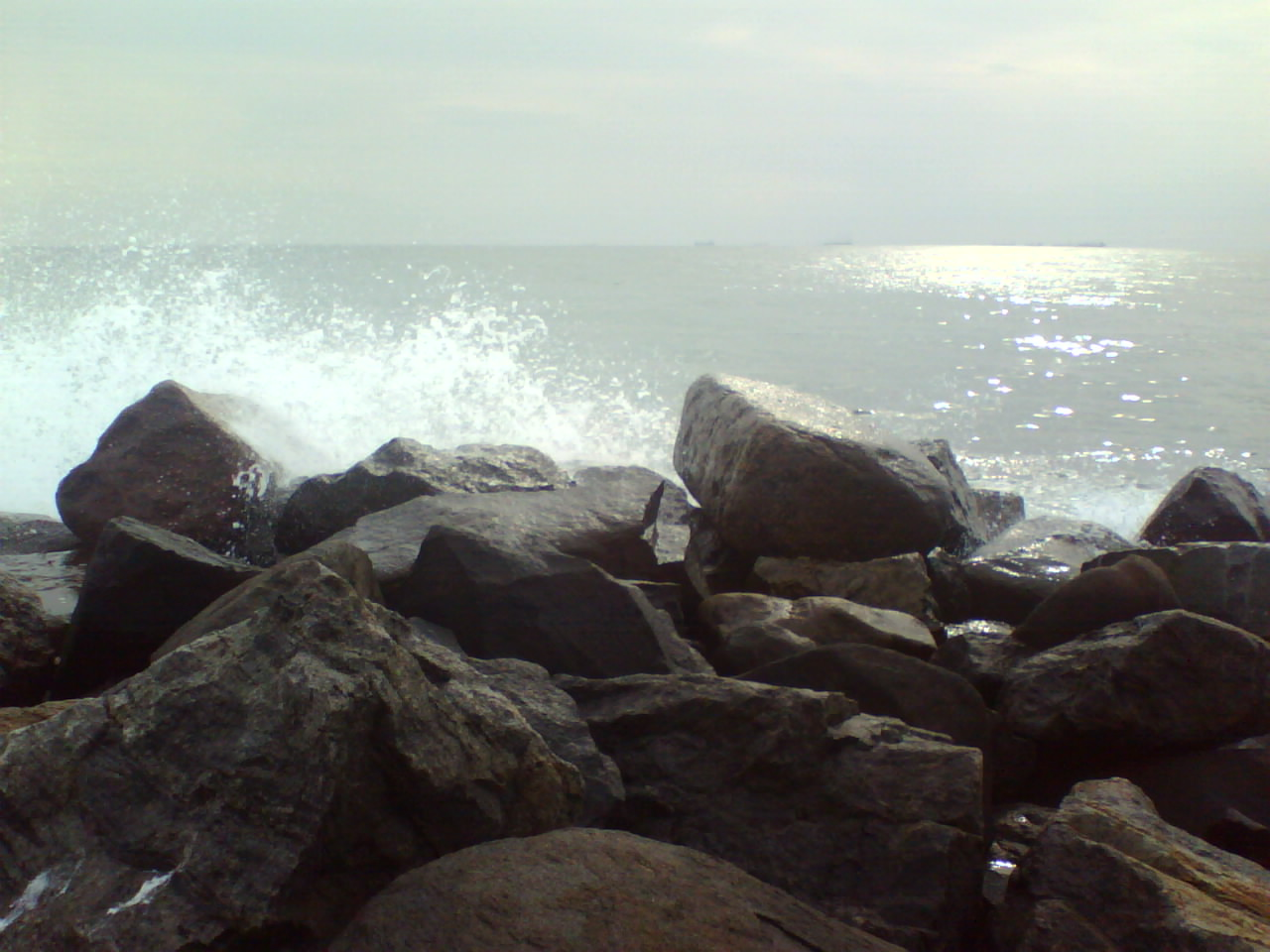

== See also ==
- Panambur
- Sasihithlu Beach
- NITK Beach
- Tannirbhavi Beach
- Ullal beach
- Someshwar Beach
- Pilikula Nisargadhama
- Kadri Park
- Tagore Park
- Bejai Museum
- Aloyseum
- Kudla Kudru
