= ONGC Mangalore Petrochemicals Limited =

ONGC Mangalore Petrochemicals Limited (OMPL) was a division of Mangalore Refinery and Petrochemicals Limited, a part of Oil and Natural Gas Corporation which is under the ownership of the Ministry of Petroleum and Natural Gas of the Government of India. OMPL was incorporated on 19 December 2006.

The OMPL complex spans 442 acres of land in Mangalore Special Economic Zone (SEZ). The project cost was estimated at ₹ 5750 crores. The complex is connected with MRPL Refinery from where the feed to the complex is supplied. It is 14 km away from the New Mangalore Port and about 15 km from Mangalore International Airport.

On 19 October 2020 the board meeting of MRPL had approved acquisition OMPL, from ONGC (Oil and Natural Gas Corporation) Ltd.
