= Boloor, Mangalore =

Locality in Mangalore, India

Boloor
- Locality
- Location in Mangalore city, Karnataka, India
- Coordinates: 12.861120261154092°N 74.82128090380911°E
- Country: India
- State: Karnataka
- City: Mangalore

Boloor is a locality in the western part of Mangalore city of Karnataka state in India. Industries such as Hindustan Unilever are situated at Boloor.
