= Adyapady =

- village
- Interactive map of Adyapady
- Coordinates: 12.9549°N 74.8941°E
- Country: India
- State: Karnataka
- District: Dakshina Kannada
- Talukas: Mangalore

Government
  - Body: Village Panchayat

Languages Tulu
  - Official: Kannada
- Time zone: UTC+5:30 (IST)
- ISO 3166 code: IN-KA
- Vehicle registration: KA
- Nearest city: Dakshina Kannada
- Civic agency: Village Panchayat
- Website: karnataka.gov.in

Adyapady is a village in the southern state of Karnataka, India. It is located in the Mangalore taluk of Dakshina Kannada district. It is named after village deity Adinatheswara Temple.

It is located on Steps of Mountain on which Mangaluru International Airport is located.

== See also ==
- Mangalore
- Dakshina Kannada
- Districts of Karnataka
