= Anthea Group =

- Type: Private
- Industry: Speciality Chemicals
- Founder: Dr. Vincent Paul
- Headquarters: Mumbai, India
- Area served: Europe, North and South America, Asia-Pacific
- Key people: Dr. Vincent Paul (Chairman); Dr. Paul Menacherry (Managing Director); Mathew Menacherry (Director); Mansoor Calcuttawala (Director); Arun Khanderia (Director)
- Divisions: Anthea Aromatics; DRT-Anthea Aroma Chemicals; Catàsynth Speciality Chemicals
- Website: www.antheagroup.com

The Anthea Group is a private group of companies based in Mumbai, India, engaged in the manufacture and export of speciality chemicals. The Group's product portfolio includes fragrance and flavour chemicals, as well as chemicals used in applications such as pharmaceuticals, flame-retardant polymers, and agrochemicals. The company markets its products in regions including North and South America, Europe, and the Asia-Pacific region.

== History ==
The Anthea Group has its origins to 1991 with the establishment of Anthea Aromatics Pvt. Ltd. (AAPL) in Navi Mumbai, India, for the manufacture of speciality chemicals used in the perfumery and flavour industry.In 2002, the company established a manufacturing facility in Roha, Maharashtra.

In 2007, AAPL entered into a 50:50 joint venture with DRT, a French company engaged in the development and manufacture of resin and terpene derivatives. In 2008, the Anthea Group acquired Crown Chemicals Pvt. Ltd., a manufacturing facility located in Tarapur MIDC. In 2011, DRT acquired a stake in Crown Chemicals, which later became a 50:50 joint venture between DRT and the Anthea Group.

In 2016, ICICI Venture, the private equity arm of ICICI Bank, invested approximately ₹120 crore in the Anthea Group for a minority stake.

The Anthea Group includes multiple companies, including Anthea Aromatics, which was founded by Vincent Paul. He previously served as head of organic chemistry at Hindustan Lever Ltd.

== Manufacturing facilities ==
The Anthea Group includes the following companies, spread across 4 locations.

Anthea Aromatics

DRT–Anthea Aroma Chemicals

Crown Chemicals

- Anthea Aromatics Pvt. Ltd., Rabale, Navi Mumbai, Maharashtra.
- DRT-Anthea Aroma Chemicals Pvt. Ltd. (2 manufacturing units) Roha, Raigad, Maharashtra. A third unit is coming up in Roha, which is expected to be operational by Mar 2017.
- Crown Chemicals Pvt. Ltd., Tarapur, Maharashtra.
- Catàsynth Speciality Chemicals Pvt. Ltd., established in 2016 and coming up in Mangalore SEZ, Karnataka.

== Research ==
The Research and Development Center of the Anthea Group is located in Rabale, Navi Mumbai. The Anthea Group claims special focus on green chemistry and eco-friendly processes. The R&D lab has been certified by the Department of Scientific and Industrial Research (India) since 2004.

=== Development of Synthetic Heliotropin (Piperonal) ===
Heliotropin (also known as Piperonal), an extract of the Sassafras tree, is used in the manufacture of perfumes, soaps and body lotions. Natural Heliotropin is obtained from Sassafras oil which is extracted from the roots of the Sassafras tree, a species of deciduous trees in the family Lauraceae. The massive commercial felling of Sassafras forests has led to the danger of extinction of the species. It is estimated that around 5 million trees are cut down every year to meet the worldwide demand for Heliotropin. The Anthea Group through its in-house research developed a synthetic grade of Heliotropin having a high purity, and has set up manufacturing facilities in Group company, Crown Chemicals. Synthetic Piperonal manufactured in Crown Chemicals is widely used in Fragrance, Flavour and Pharmaceutical applications.

The US Food and Drug Administration has found synthetic Piperonal to be safe for human consumption.

== Timeline of Strategic Initiatives / Investments ==
- 1992: Commences manufacturing of F&F chemicals in Rabale, Navi Mumbai.
- 2002: Establishes manufacturing facility in Roha.
- 2007: Enters into a strategic tie-up with French multinational DRT (les Dérivés Résiniques et Terpéniques).
- 2007: Acquires Crown Chemicals in Tarapur.
- 2008: Establishes DRT-Anthea as a 50:50 JV with DRT. DRT-Anthea sets up new facility in Roha.
- 2009: Starts manufacturing synthetic Piperonal in Crown Chemicals. Obtains quality approvals from global F&F multinationals.
- 2011: DRT acquires a significant shareholding in Crown Chemicals, which has since been increased to 50%.
- 2011: DRT-Anthea purchases a 23,000 sq. m. plot in Roha for future expansion.
- 2014: Capacity expansion completed in Crown Chemicals.
- 2016: Group company Catàsynth Specialty Chemicals is formed.
- 2016: ICICI Ventures picks up minority stake in Anthea Aromatics for Rs 120 crore.
- 2017: Capacity expansion completed in DRT-Anthea Aroma Chemicals.
