= Centre for Entrepreneurship Opportunities and Learning =

Coordinates: 12.861723°N 74.836725°E

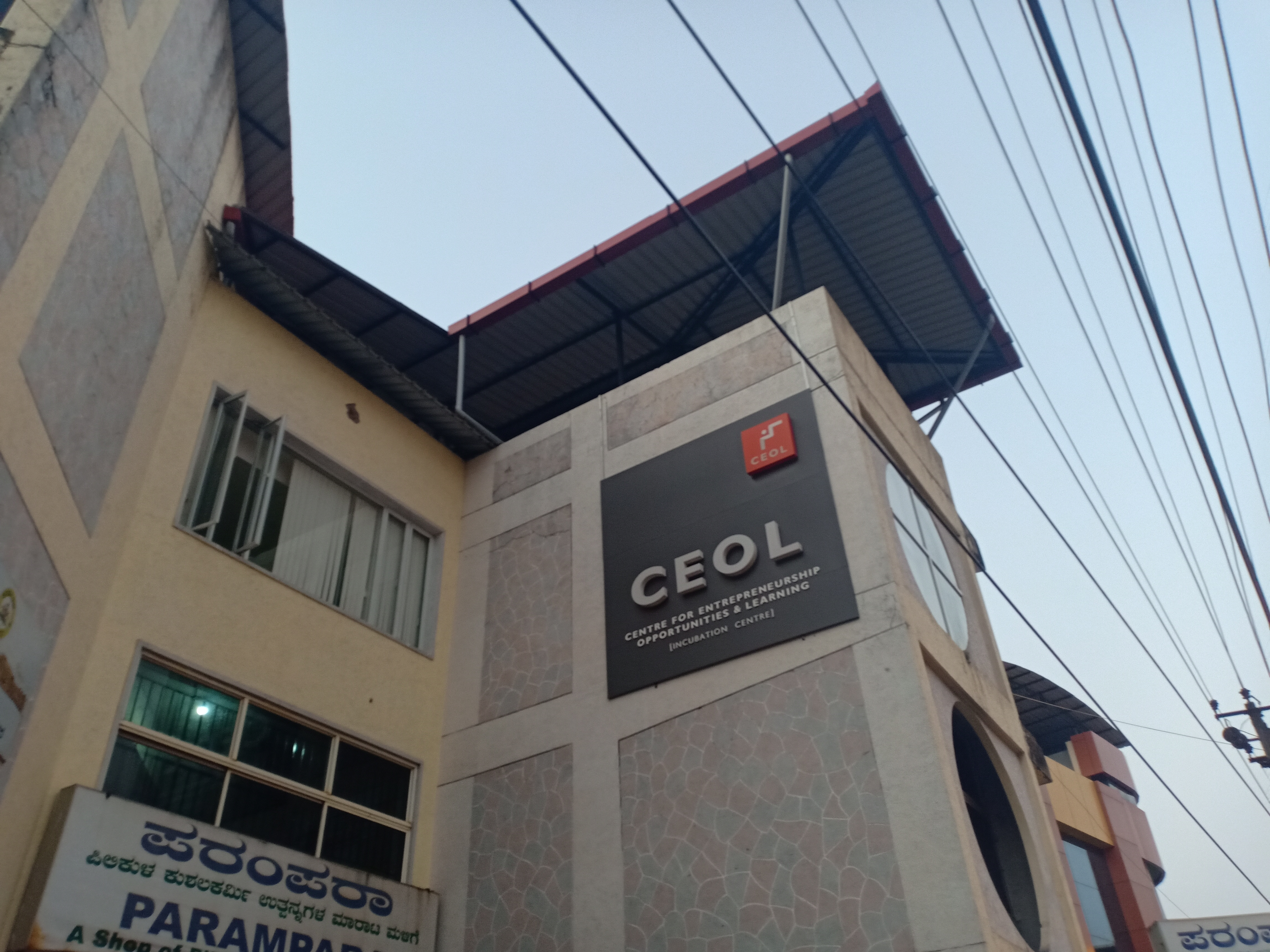
- Company type: Startup incubation centre
- Industry: Startups and IT
- Founded: December 2017
- Headquarters: Mangaluru, Karnataka, India

Centre for Entrepreneurship Opportunities and Learning, commonly known as CEOL, is a startup incubation centre situated in Mangaluru city of Karnataka in India. It was launched by Nirmala Sitharaman in 2017. CEOL aims to create a Silicon Valley in the west coast of India.

== Objectives ==
The objectives of CEOL are

- Offer help and support to startups
- Bring in venture capital
- Bring industries to interact with startups
- Bring mentors to guide new entrepreneurs

CEOL is operated and managed by a committee headed by the Deputy Commissioner to provide young entrepreneurs the ecosystem to work on their ideas.
