= Baikampady =

- Locality(Industrial)
- Location in Karnataka, India
- Coordinates: 12.953398°N 74.816795°E
- Country: India
- State: Karnataka
- District: Dakshina Kannada
- City: Mangaluru
- Named for: Fishing, Industries

Languages
  - Official: Tulu, Kannada
- Time zone: UTC+5:30 (IST)
- Postal code: 575010
- Vehicle registration: KA 19, KA 62

Baikampady (Baikampadi) is a place in the northern part of Mangaluru in Dakshina Kannada district. It is at 6 km from Surathkal. There is an industrial estate, where many small scale industries are located. The Baikampadi industrial estate has many electrical, engineering, leaf spring, hollow blocks and pharmaceutical industries. It serves nearby New Mangalore port (NMPT), Mangalore Fertilizers and Mangalore petroleum refinery (MRPL). There is market yard for agriculture produce (APMC) built few years ago is lying unutilised. Sri Ram Mandir kodical is also located in Baikampady.
