= Mangalore Special Economic Zone =

Mangalore Special Economic Zone or MSEZ is a Special Economic Zone spread across 1,600 acres in Mangalore, Karnataka, India

MSEZ is managed by Mangalore Special Economic Zone Limited(MSEZL). The MSEZL is located 15 km (9.3 mi) from Mangalore city center, off Cochin-Mumbai NH 66, 5 km (3.1 mi) from Mangalore International Airport and 8 km (5.0 mi) from all-weather deep-draft sea port, New Mangalore Port.

MSEZL is jointly promoted by Oil & Natural Gas Corporation (ONGC), a Fortune 500 Company and Infrastructure Leasing & Finance Services (IL&FS), Karnataka Industrial Area Development Board (KIADB) and Kanara Chamber of Commerce and Industry (KCCI). A combination of Government entities, a large financial institution, and an apex chamber have come together to develop MSEZL with industrial infrastructure.

== Land acquisition and Controversies ==
In 2012, the Mangalore Special Economic Zone (MSEZ) initiated the acquisition of approximately 1,800 acres of land in the Nellidadi, Bajpe area, which included the historic Nellidadi Guthu house and the Kantheri Dhoomavathi Temple.

This move faced strong opposition from the local community, particularly the 350 members of the Nellidadi Guthu family, who were unwilling to relocate from their ancestral land and sacred sites. Despite assurances from MSEZ officials that the temple would remain unaffected, residents reported instances of harassment and demolition of properties without prior notice. The community expressed their determination to protect their heritage, even filing legal actions to halt the acquisition process. MSEZ sent 60 goons to demolish their house on May 10 and harassed a number of people, including women and children.

After forcibly acquiring all the land, company were not able to acquire the Dhoomavathi Temple and the Nellidadi Guthu house. They gave special permission to the members of the house to enter the temple and Housefor the worship of Daiva. However, in March 2025, they restricted them from worshipping the god again.
