= Mangalore Refinery and Petrochemicals Limited =

Subsidiary of Oil and Natural Gas Corporation

- Type: Division of Oil and Natural Gas Corporation
- Industry: Oil and gas
- Founded: 7 March 1988 (38 years ago)
- Headquarters: Mudapadav, Kuthethoor P.O., Via Katipalla, Mangalore, India
- Key people: Arun Kumar Singh, (Chairman); Mundkur Shyamprasad Kamath (MD)
- Products: Petroleum, Petrochemicals and Natural gas
- Revenue: ▲₹86,161 crore (US$8.9 billion) (2022)
- Operating income: ▲₹2,703 crore (US$280 million) (2022)
- Net income: ▲₹2,950 crore (US$310 million) (2022)
- Total assets: ▲₹40,071 crore (US$4.2 billion) (2022)
- Total equity: ▲₹7,209 crore (US$750 million) (2022)
- Owner: Oil and Natural Gas Corporation, Ministry of Petroleum and Natural Gas, Government of India
- Divisions: Shell MRPL Aviation
- Website: www.mrpl.co.in

Mangalore Refinery and Petrochemicals Limited (MRPL), is a division of Oil and Natural Gas Corporation (ONGC) which is under the ownership of the Ministry of Petroleum and Natural Gas of the Government of India. Established in 1988, the refinery is located at Katipalla, north from the centre of Mangalore. The refinery was established after displacing five villages, namely, Bala, Kalavar, Kuthetoor, Katipalla, and Adyapadi.

The refinery has a versatile design with high flexibility to process crudes of various API gravities with a high degree of automation. MRPL has a design capacity to process 15 million metric tonnes per annum and is the only refinery in India to have two hydrocrackers producing premium diesel (high cetane). It also has a polypropylene unit with a capacity of 0.44 million metric tonnes per year. It is one among the two refineries in India to have two CCRs producing high octane unleaded petrol. Currently, the refinery processes around 14.65 million tonnes of crude per year. The company's revenues stood at ₹60,062.02 crore (US$8.4 billion) in 2020.

MRPL, which was a joint sector company, became a public-sector undertaking after the acquisition of a majority of its shares by ONGC. As of June 2020, 71.63% shares were held by ONGC, 16.95% shares were held by Hindustan Petroleum Corporation Limited (HPCL), and the remaining shares were held by financial institutions and the general public. MRPL has been declared a Miniratna (mini jewel), by the Government of India in 2007.

Before its acquisition by ONGC in March 2003, MRPL was a joint venture oil refinery promoted by HPCL, a public sector company and IRIL & associates (AV Birla Group). MRPL was set up in 1988 with an initial processing capacity of 3.0 million metric tonnes per annum which was later expanded to the present capacity of 15 million metric tonnes per annum.

The refinery was conceived to maximise middle distillates, with the capability to process light to heavy and sour to sweet crudes with 24 to 46 API gravity. On 28 March 2003, ONGC acquired A.V. Birla Group's stake and further infused equity capital of ₹600 crores, making MRPL a majority-held subsidiary of ONGC. The lenders also agreed to the debt restructuring package (DRP) proposed by ONGC, which included, inter alia, conversion of up to ₹3,65,54,884 of the company's loans into equity. Subsequently, ONGC acquired the equity allotted to the lenders under the DRP, raising ONGC's holding in MRPL to 71.63%.

On 30 August 2018, MRPL was approved a merger with HPCL by ONGC.

== See also ==
- Oil and Natural Gas Corporation
- List of oil refineries in India
- Economy of Mangalore
- Mangalore Special Economic Zone (MSEZ)
