= Mangalore Chemicals & Fertilizers =

Indian fertilizer company

Mangalore Chemicals & Fertilizers Limited

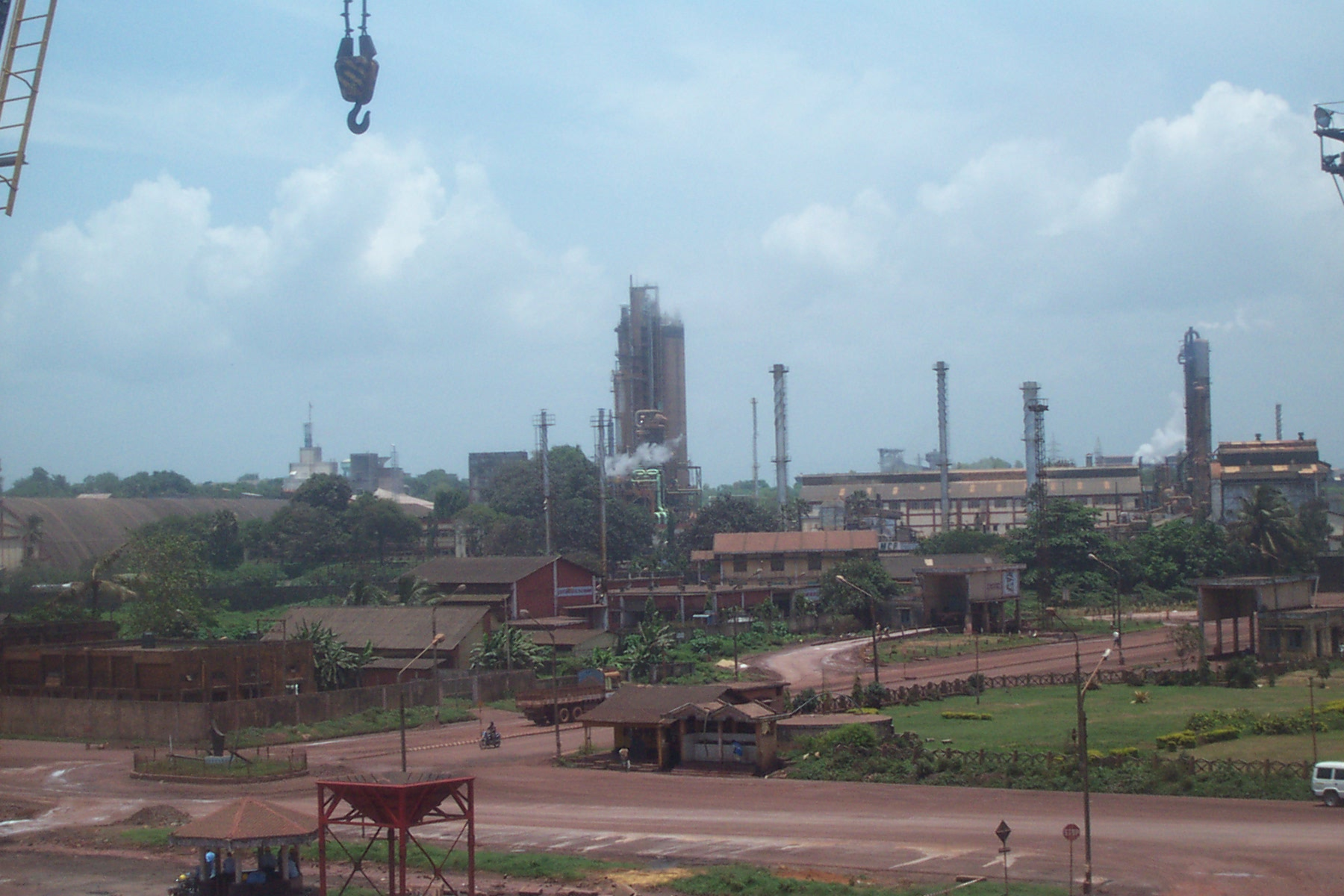
- View of Mangalore Chemicals & Fertilizers
- Type: Public
- Traded as: BSE: 530011; NSE: MANGCHEFER
- Industry: Agriculture
- Founded: 1974
- Headquarters: Level-11, UB Towers, UB City No.24, Vittal Mallya Road, Bangalore, India
- Key people: Arun Duggal (Chairman); Suresh Krishnan (Managing Director)
- Products: Fertilizers, Chemicals
- Revenue: US$ 0.711 billion (2010–11)
- Parent: Adventz Group
- Website: Official Website

Mangalore Chemicals & Fertilizers Limited is the largest manufacturer of chemical fertilizers in the state of Karnataka, India. The company is part of the Adventz Group. The company's corporate and registered office is at UB City, Bangalore and its factory unit is in Panambur, north of Mangalore.

The company deals with fertilizers like urea, Diammonium phosphate, granulated fertilizers, liquid fertilizers, soil conditioners, Muriate of potash, soil micronutrients, speciality fertilizers, food grade Ammonium bicarbonate, industrial chemicals like Sulphuric acid and Sulphonated granulated fertilizers. The marketing offices of MCF are located in Karnataka, Kerala, Tamil Nadu, Andhra Pradesh, Telangana and Maharashtra.

== Overview ==
Mangalore Chemicals and Fertilizers Limited (MCF) is a subsidiary of Zuari Fertilisers and Chemicals Limited, an Adventz Group company, which owns a 53.03% stake as of March 2016. The Adventz Group and the UB Group are promoters of MCF. In 1990, Government of Karnataka selected the UB Group to take over the management of MCF, which was then a potential sick unit, with losses to the tune of about 600 million rupees. Adventz Group later took over the management. The company had a turnover of Rs. 2,523.83 crores in the financial year 2010–11.

== Infrastructure ==
Manufacturing facilities

The company has capacity to manufacture 2,17,800MT of Ammonia (intermediate product), 3,79,500MT of Urea, 2,55,500MT of Phosphatic fertilizers (DAP & NP 20:20:00:13), 15,330MT of Ammonium bicarbonate (ABC), 33,000MT of Sulphuric acid and 21,450MT of Sulphonated naphthalene formaldehyde (SNF) annually.
The design and engineering of the Ammonia/Urea plants was done by Humphreys & Glasgow Limited, London, a leading international firm in the fertilizer field and their associates, Humphreys & Glasgow Consultants Pvt. Ltd., Mumbai. (The firm is now merged with Jacobs Engineering, USA). The Phosphatic plant was designed and engineered by Toyo Engineering Corporation, Japan. Indian firms PDIL and Furnace Fabrica designed and constructed the ABC and Sulphuric acid plant respectively.
In 2010, MCF forayed into the manufacture of sulphonated naphthalene formaldehyde (SNF). SNF is a speciality basic chemical used in construction industry. It is largely consumed in formulation of concrete admixtures which facilitate dispersion of the cement particles and increases the rate of hydration resulting in usage of less water for concrete mixture.
In 2003, the company implemented SAP R/3 for its entire operation.

Utilities

- Cooling water system – 16,600 m^{3}/h circulation rate.
- Water De-mineralizing plant – 120 m^{3}/h capacity.
- Nitrogen plant – 650 Nm^{3}/h of gaseous nitrogen and equivalent 50 Nm^{3}/h of liquid nitrogen.
- Instrument Air Compressor with Instrument Air drier – 1,500 Nm^{3}/h capacity.
- Product Handling – There are four streams for Urea and three streams for phosphatic fertilizers for bagging and dispatch.
- Auxiliary Boiler – The Ammonia and Urea plants are supplemented with an auxiliary boiler of 60 MT/h steam capacity at 75 kg/cm^{2} pressure and 480 °C.
- Purge Gas Recovery Unit (PGRU) – The productivity of the Ammonia plant was increased by installing a PGRU in May 1984 of 4,800 Nm^{3}/h capacity.
- Captive Power Plant – To overcome the frequent interruptions in power supply, resulting in equipment failure and wastage of energy during shut down and start ups of the process plants, a Captive Power Plant with Wärtsilä Diesel Engine was commissioned in 1985. This has ensured smooth functioning and improved life of all the plants and critical equipment through the steady supply of quality power captively produced. The 48MW captive power plant complex consists of 8 units of Wärtsilä 18V32 DG sets each of 6MW capacity. The power plant generation voltage is 11,000V at 50 Hz. The power plant meets the total power requirement of the entire complex.
- Imported Ammonia & Phosphoric Acid Terminal – The terminal facilitates direct unloading of ammonia and phosphoric acid from a ship. Ammonia is stored in a 10,000MT atmospheric pressure storage tank and Phosphoric acid is stored in two tanks each of 8,000MT capacity.
- Water Reservoir – The entire complex requires 2 Million Gallons (MG) per day of clarified water which is supplied by Mangalore City Corporation from Netravathi river. In order to overcome the problem of water shortages, especially during summer, two reservoirs of 6MG and 18MG capacity were constructed within the factory premises.
- Bulk Storage (Silo)- There are two separate silos to store 30,000MT and 10,000MT of Urea and Phosphatic fertilizers respectively.

== Products ==
Manufactured products

- Mangala Urea.
- Mangala DAP.
- Mangala Ambica (ABC).
- Mangala 20:20:00:13.
- ChemCF NL – Sulphonated Naphthalene Formaldehyde Liquid.
- ChemCF NP – Sulphonated Naphthalene Formaldehyde Powder.
- Suphuric acid (98%).

Other products

- Mangala MOP.
- Speciality fertilizers – Mangala Bio20, Mangala 3X, Mangala Calmax, Mangala Sulphomex.
- Fertigation products – Mangala 18:18:18+2MgO+TE, Mangala NPK 19:19:19.
- Soil Conditioners – Mangala Setright for alkaline soil, Mangala Setright for acidic soil.
- Organic products – Mangala Bio Gold, Mangala Gold, Mangala Neem Organic Manure, Mangala Organic Granules, Mangala Megacal.
- Plant Nutrition products – Mangala Tur Special, Mangala GT Booster, Mangala Cotton Special, Mangala Chilli Special.

== Safety, Health, Environment and Pollution Control ==
The company has obtained Occupational Health and Safety Management System Certification OHSAS 18001 as a part of its commitment to continual improvement. Det Norske Veritas, the certification agency has recertified the company’s OHSAS 18001 system, conforming to the latest 2007 version.
As an ISO 14001 certified Company, the company installed waste water recovery facility to treat, recycle and reuse the entire quantity of sewage and process effluents, thereby achieving zero liquid effluent discharge. It has also implemented a rain water harvesting system and sewage treatment plant at its township. The treated sewage water is used for gardening purpose. Continuing with its green initiative, the company planted an additional 5000 saplings in the green belt area in its factory in Mangalore in 2010.
