= Tannirbavi Tree Park =

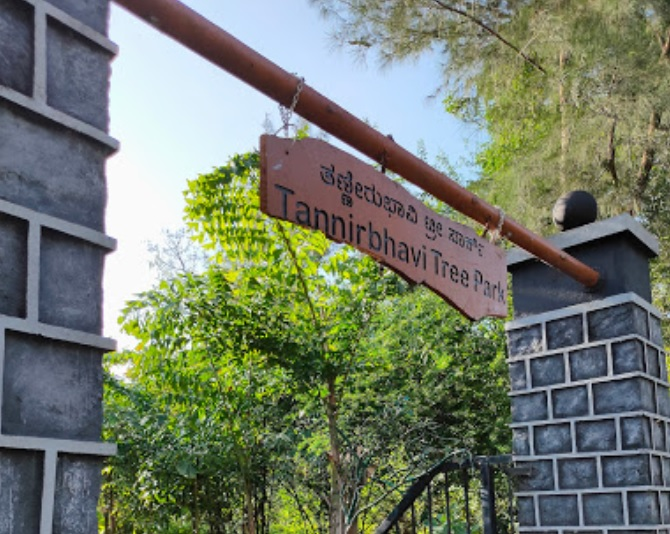
- Entrance of the Tannirbhavi Tree Park in Mangaluru

- Location at Mangaluru
- Coordinates: 12°50′23″N 74°47′28″E
- Country: India
- State: Karnataka
- District: Dakshina Kannada
- City: Mangaluru
- Founded: 2016

Government
  - Body: Mangaluru City Corporation

Tannirbavi Tree Park is a park in Mangaluru city in the state of Karnataka in India. It is spread over two parcels of land including nine acres of Gurupura riverfront and 22.5 acres on the beachfront. This park has a variety of species from Western Ghats and herbal plants. The park also has a children's area, a food court, a cultural area, beachfront amenities such as an information kiosk, beach volleyball court and a beachfront relaxation area with Pergolas. The park also has a children's area, a food court, a cultural area, beachfront amenities such as an information kiosk, beach volleyball court and a beachfront relaxation area with Pergolas.

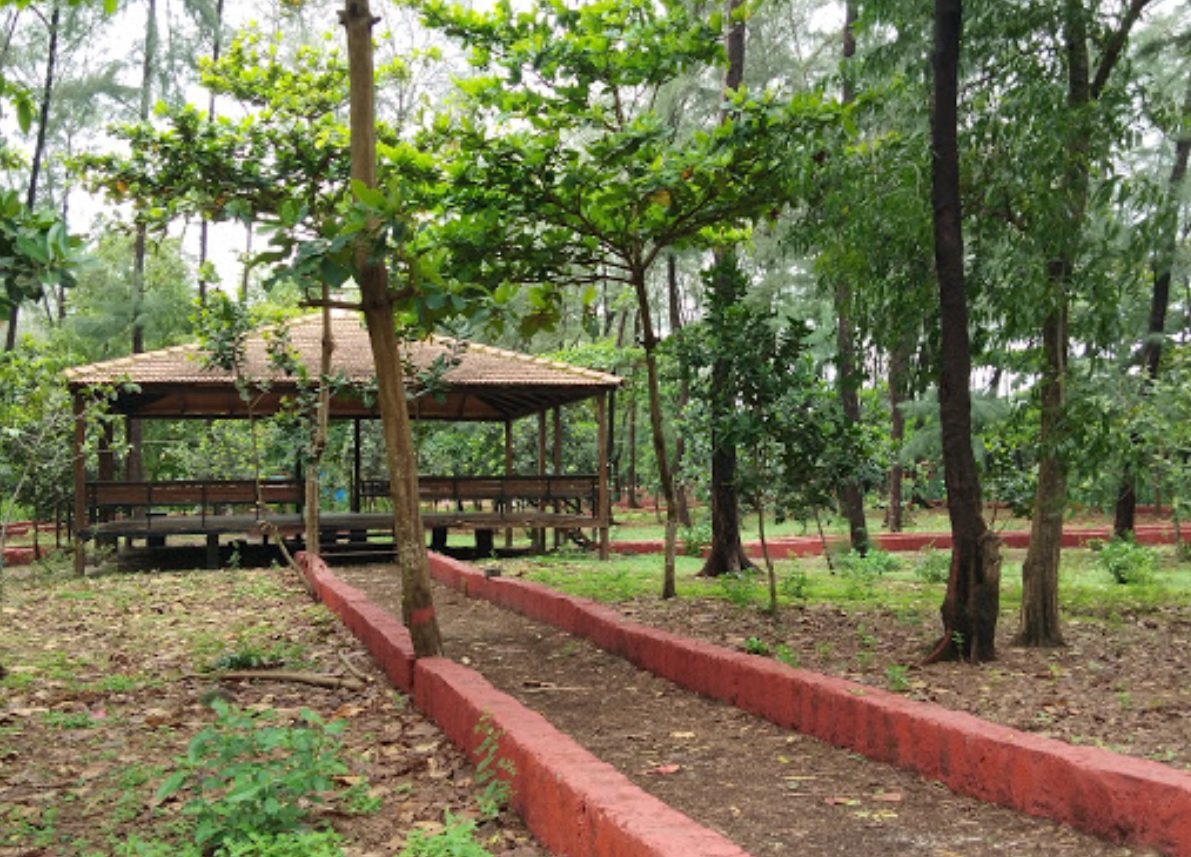
Bandstand at Tannirbhavi Tree Park
