= The Congregation of the Apostolic Carmel - Karnataka Province =

- Formation: 1870
- Founders: Mother Veronica of the Passion
- Founded at: Mangalore, Karnataka in India
- Coordinates: 12.856717°N 74.836422°E
- Superior General: Sr. Maria Nirmalini A. C.
- Provincial Superior (Karnataka Province): Sr. Maria Naveena A. C. (2025–[2028])
- Website: ackarnatakaprovince.org

The Congregation of the Apostolic Carmel - Karnataka Province is a Catholic women's religious congregation based in Mangalore, Karnataka, India.

== Founding ==
The congregation was established in 1870 by three Catholic nuns from France of the order of Sisters of the Apostolic Carmel. Among them was the Englishwoman Veronica of the Passion.

== Educational institutions ==
The educational institutions under Congregation of the Apostolic Carmel are:

=== Higher education ===
- St. Agnes College, Mangaluru (1921)
- Carmel College, Modankap, Bantwal (2010)

=== Professional education ===
- St Ann's Teacher Training Institute, Mangaluru (1890)
- St. Ann's College of Education, Mangaluru (1943)
- St Agnes Teacher Training Institute for Special Education, Mangaluru (1992)
- St Ann's Diploma in Pre Primary Education, Mangaluru (2005)
- Carmel D.Ed. College, Bidar (2009)

=== Vocational and community colleges ===
- St. Agnes Vocational Training Centre, Mangaluru (1990)
- Vijaymari Technical Institute, Mangaluru (1965)
- Carmel Vocational Training Institute, Bidar (1999)
- Community College, Vijaymari (2006)

=== Pre-university colleges ===
- St. Agnes PU College, Mangalore (1920)
- St. Ann's Composite P.U. College, Mangaluru (1997)
- Ladyhill Victoria Composite P.U. College, Urwa (1999)
- Carmel Composite P.U. College, Modankap (2000)
- St. Cecily's Composite P.U. College, Udupi (2002)
- Holy Rosary Composite P.U. College, Moodbidri (2002)
- St. Mary's Composite P.U. College, Falnir (2002)

=== Secondary schools ===
- St. Ann's High School, Mangalore (1870)
- St. Agnes High School, Mangaluru (1921)
- Ladyhill Victoria Girls High School, Urwa, Mangaluru (1921)
- St. Cecily's High School, Udupi (1933)
- St. Joseph's High School, Kundapura (1946)
- St. Mary's High School, Mangaluru (1948)
- Carmel Girls’ High School, Modankap, Bantwal (1963)
- Holy Rosary High School, Moodbidri (1964)
- Stella Maris High School, Gangulli (1966)
- Carmel High School, Kemmanu (1971)
- Vidya Jyothi High School, Kunjathbail, Mangaluru (2008)

=== Kannada higher primary schools ===
- St. Ann's Higher Primary School, Mangaluru (1873)
- Ladyhill Higher Primary School, Urwa, Mangaluru (1885)
- St. Mary's Higher Primary School, Mangaluru (1895)
- St. Cecily's Higher Primary School, Udupi (1918)
- St. Joseph's Higher Primary School, Kundapura (1930)
- St. Philomena Higher Primary School, Kemmanu (1933)
- Stella Maris Higher Primary School, Someshwar, Kotekar (1937)
- Infant Jesus Higher Primary School, Kavoor, Mangaluru (1939)
- St. Agnes Higher Primary School, Mangaluru (1946)
- Vidya Jyothi Higher Primary, Kunjathbail, Mangaluru (1989)

=== English medium secondary schools ===
- Mary Immaculate School, Bengaluru (1958)
- Carmel English School, Nanjangud (1968)
- St. Joseph's School, Mysuru (1970)
- Carmel Vidya Vikas School, Bailhongal, Belagavi (2005)
- Little Flower School, Lingsugur (2005)
- Carmel English School, Kemmannu (2006)
- Stella Maris English School, Gangulli (2007)

=== English medium higher primary schools ===
- St. Mary's English Higher Primary School, Falnir, Mangaluru (1961)
- Carmel English Higher Primary School (1964)
- St. Agnes English Higher Primary School (1965)

=== CBSE-affiliated schools ===
- Carmel School, Moodbidri (2013)
- St. Agnes School, Mangaluru (2015)
- Carmel School, Kotekar (2023)
- Carmel School, Mangaluru (2013)
- St. Cecily's English Higher Primary School, Udupi (2023)
- Mount Carmel Central School, Maryhill, Mangaluru (2008)

=== ICSE-affiliated schools ===
- Mary Immaculate School, Bengaluru (2012/2013)
- Ladyhill English Higher Primary School (ICSE), Mangalore (2025)

=== Special education ===
- St. Agnes Special School, Mangaluru (1970)
- Carmel Vidya Vikas Residential School for the Mentally Challenged Children, Bailhongal, Belagavi (1999)

=== Preparatory schools ===
- Mary Immaculate Preparatory School, Bengaluru (1958)
- St. Cecily's Preparatory School, Udupi (1959)
- Ladyhill Preparatory School, Urwa, Mangaluru (1959)
- St. Mary's Preparatory School, Falnir, Mangaluru (1959)
- St. Agnes Preparatory School, Bendore, Mangaluru (1965)
- Shanthi Nilaya Preparatory School, Nanjangud (1967)
- St. Joseph's Preparatory School, Mysuru (1969)
- Stella Maris Preparatory School, Someshwar, Kotekar (2004)
- Carmel Preparatory School, Kemmannu (2005)
- Carmel Vidya Vikas Preparatory School, Bailhongal, Belgaum (2005)
- Little Flower Preparatory School, Lingsugur (2005)
- Stella Maris Preparatory School, Gangulli (2007)
