= Mangaluru =

Mangaluru: Kudla (Tulu); Mangaluru (Kannada); Kodial (Konkani); Mangalapuram (Malayalam); Maikala (Beary); Mangalore
- City
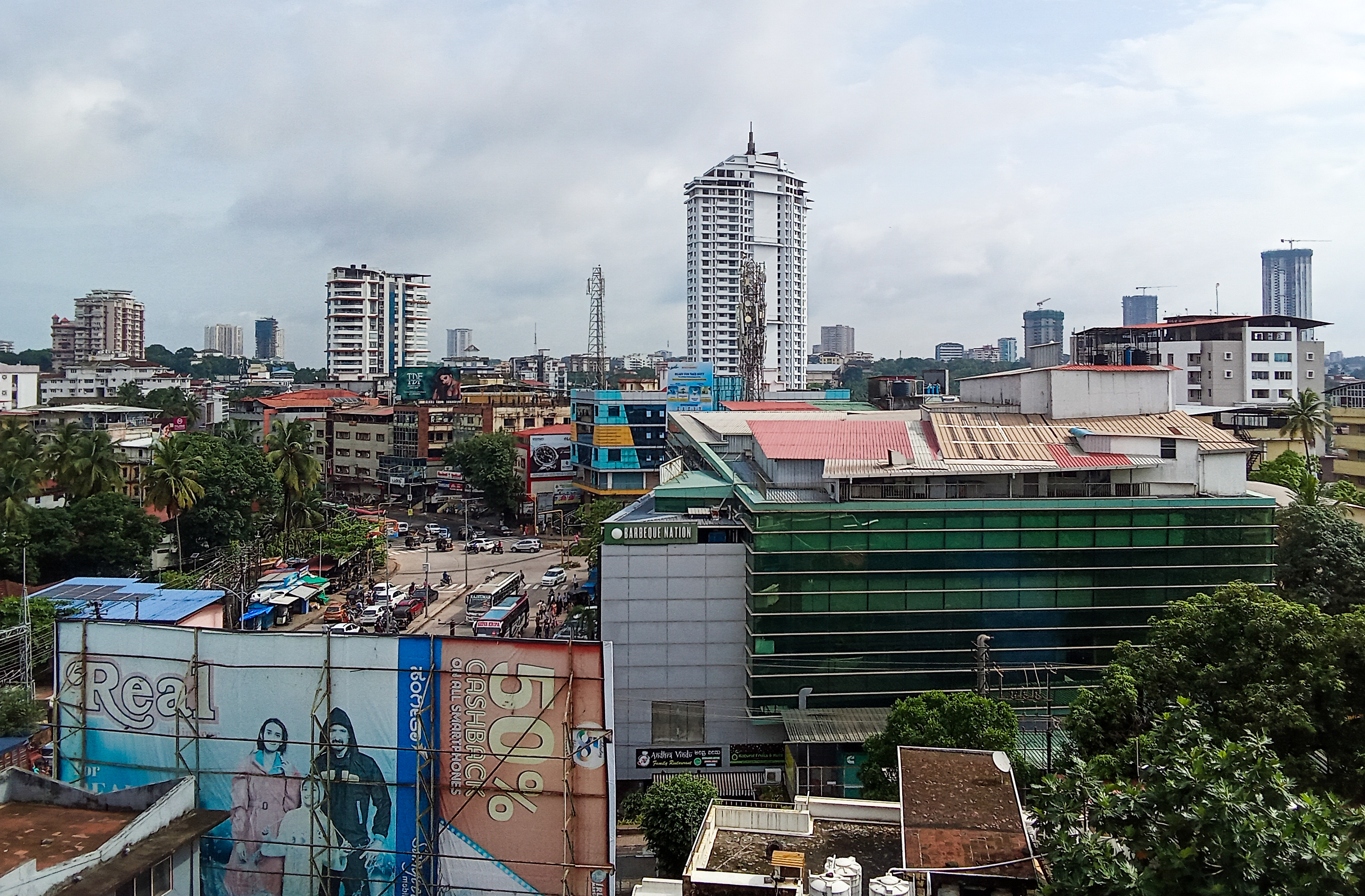
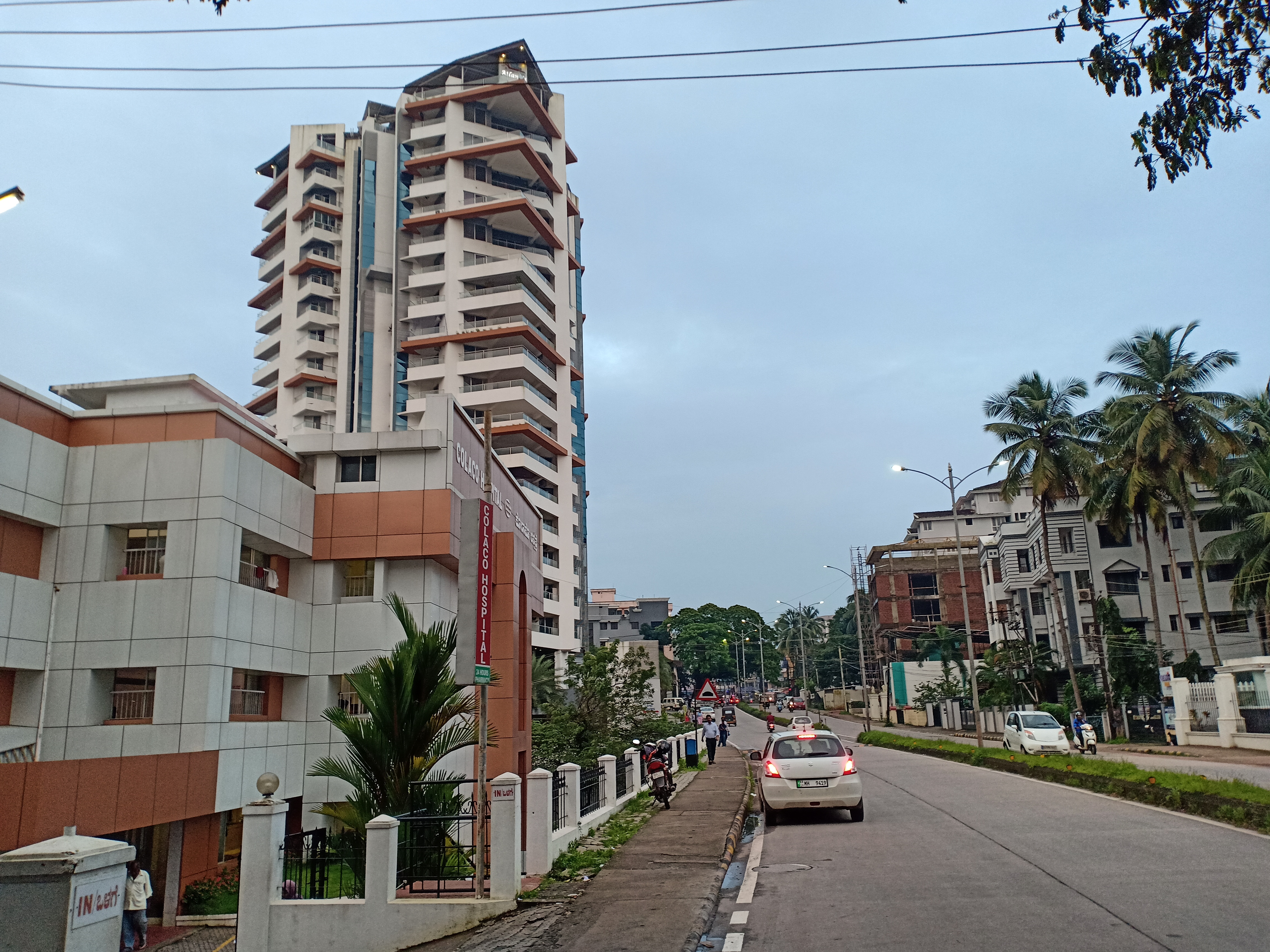
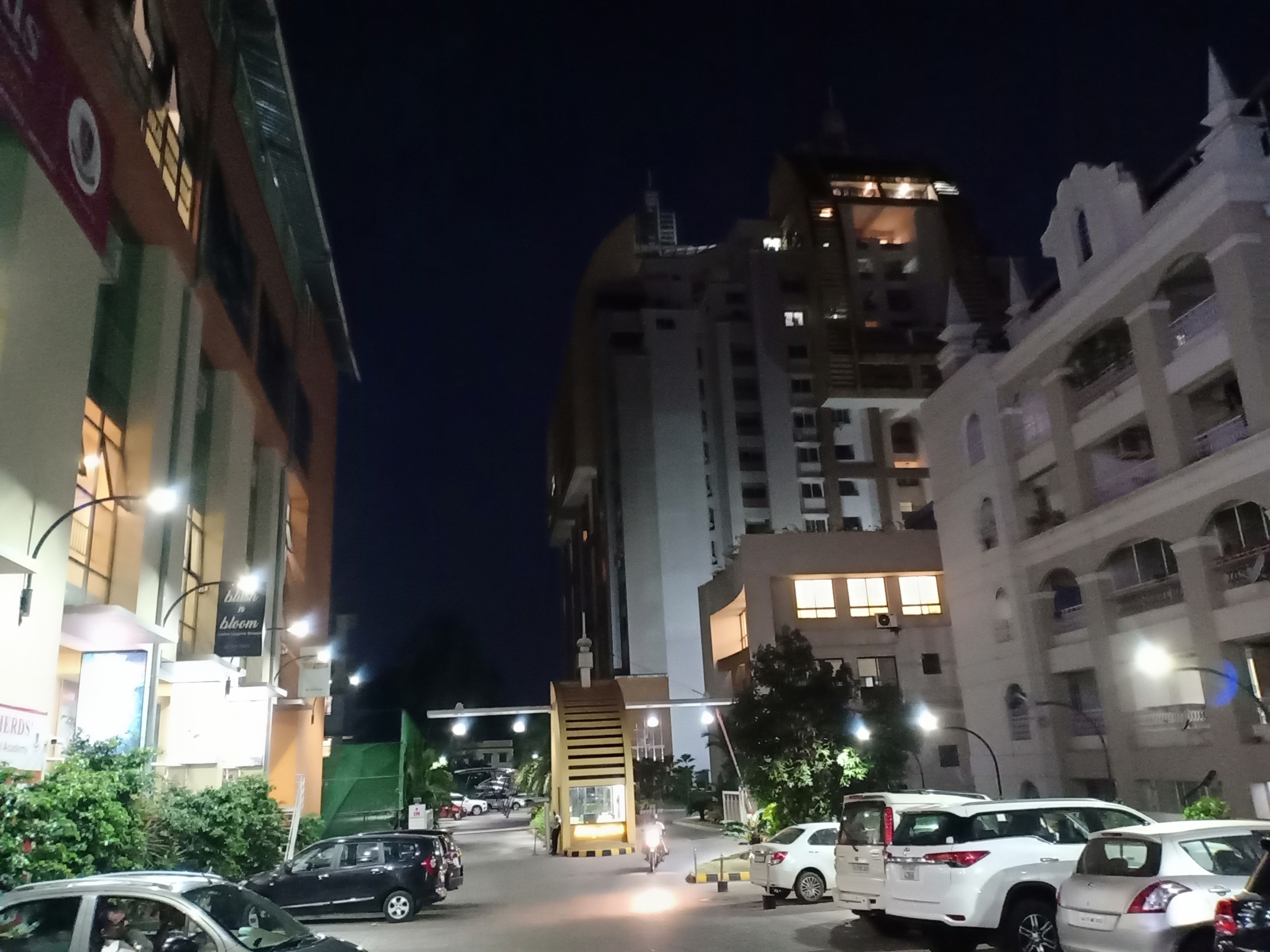
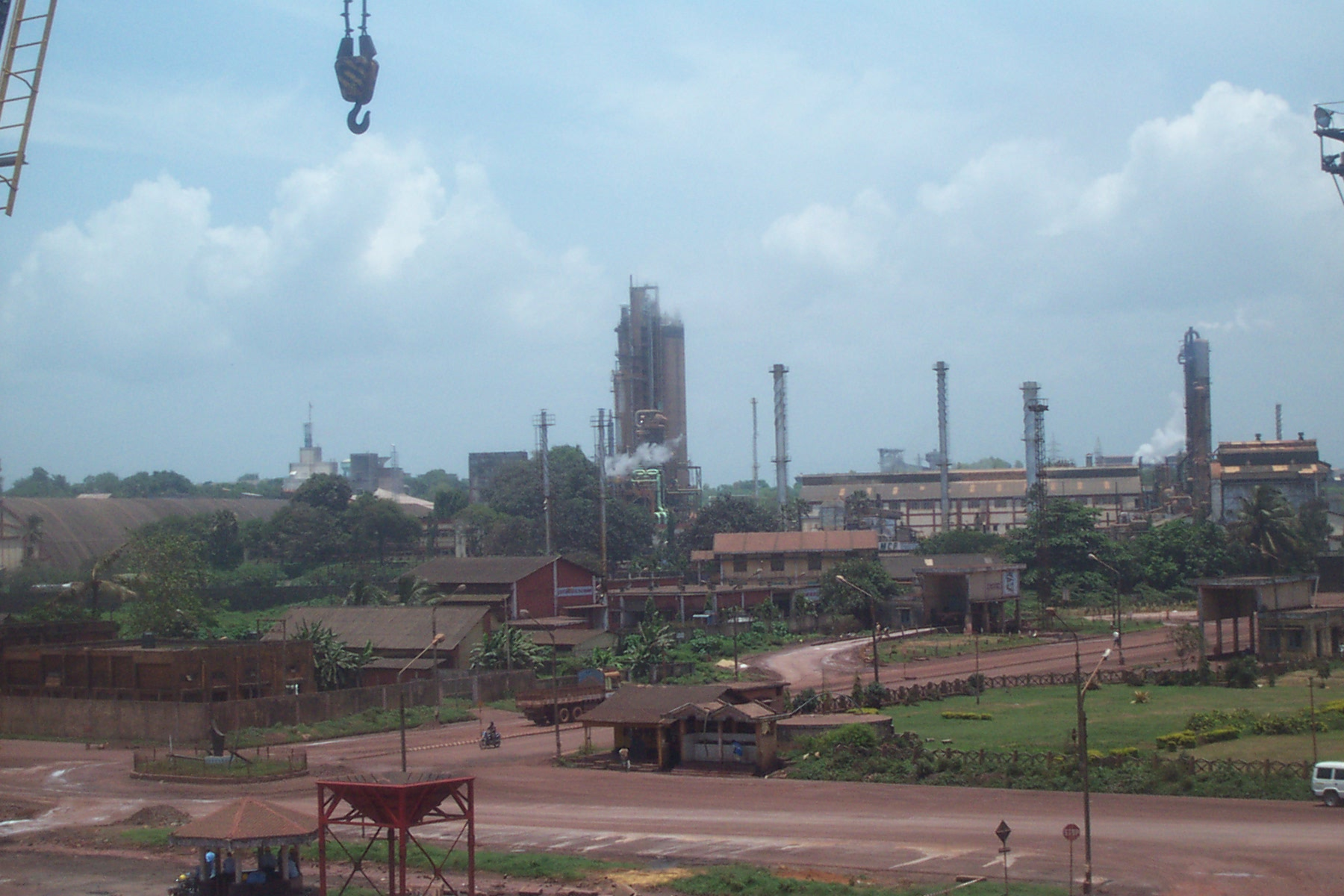
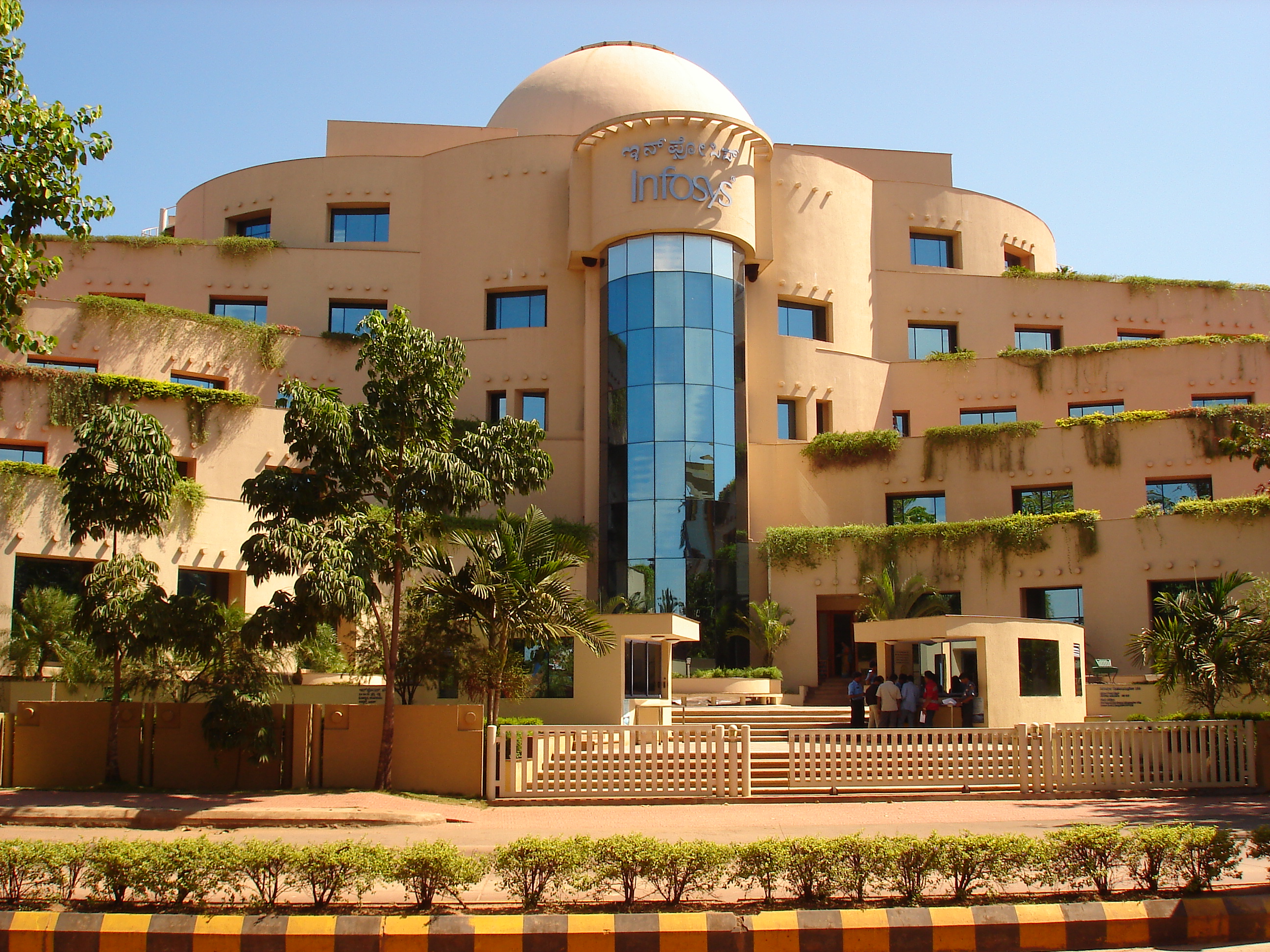
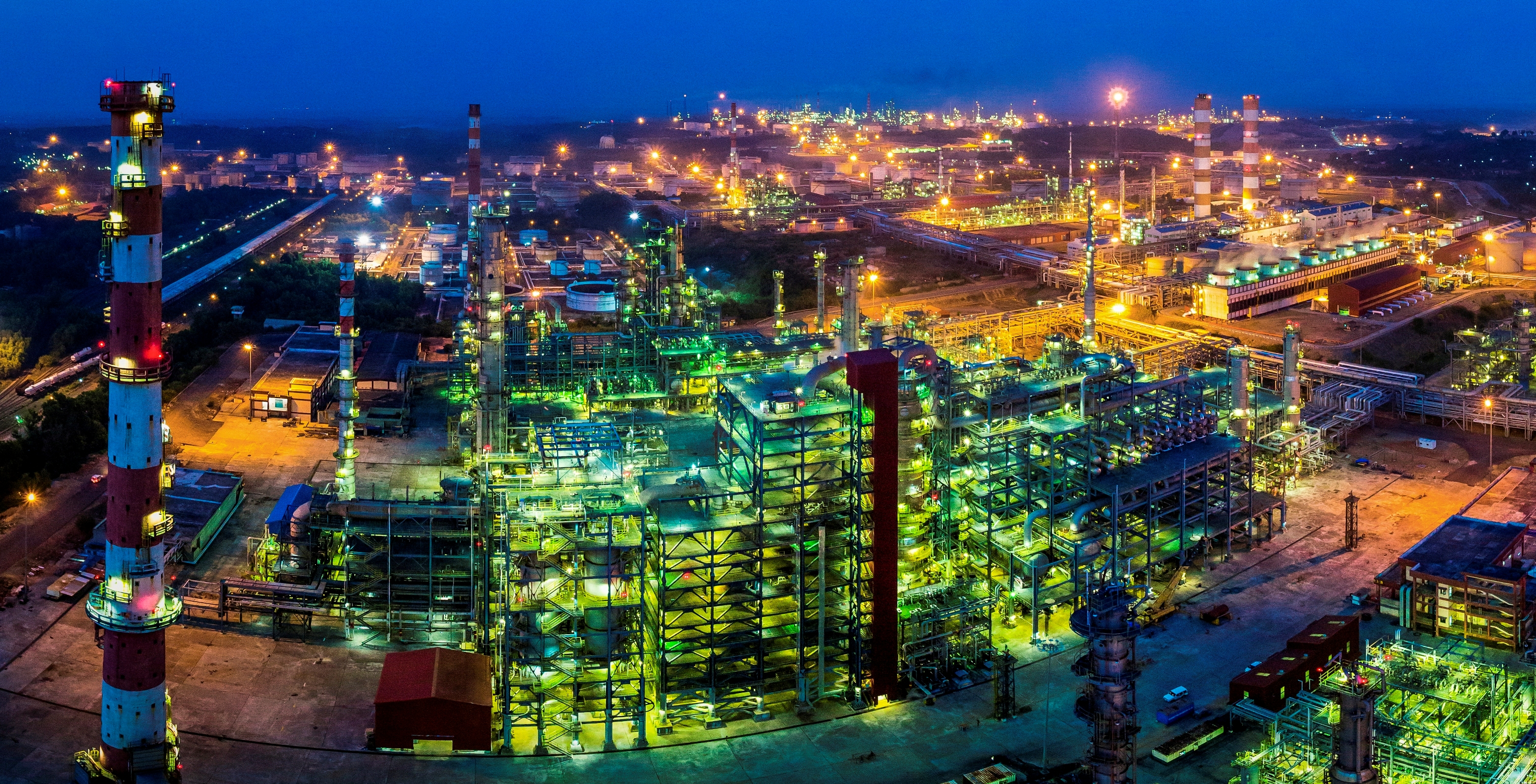
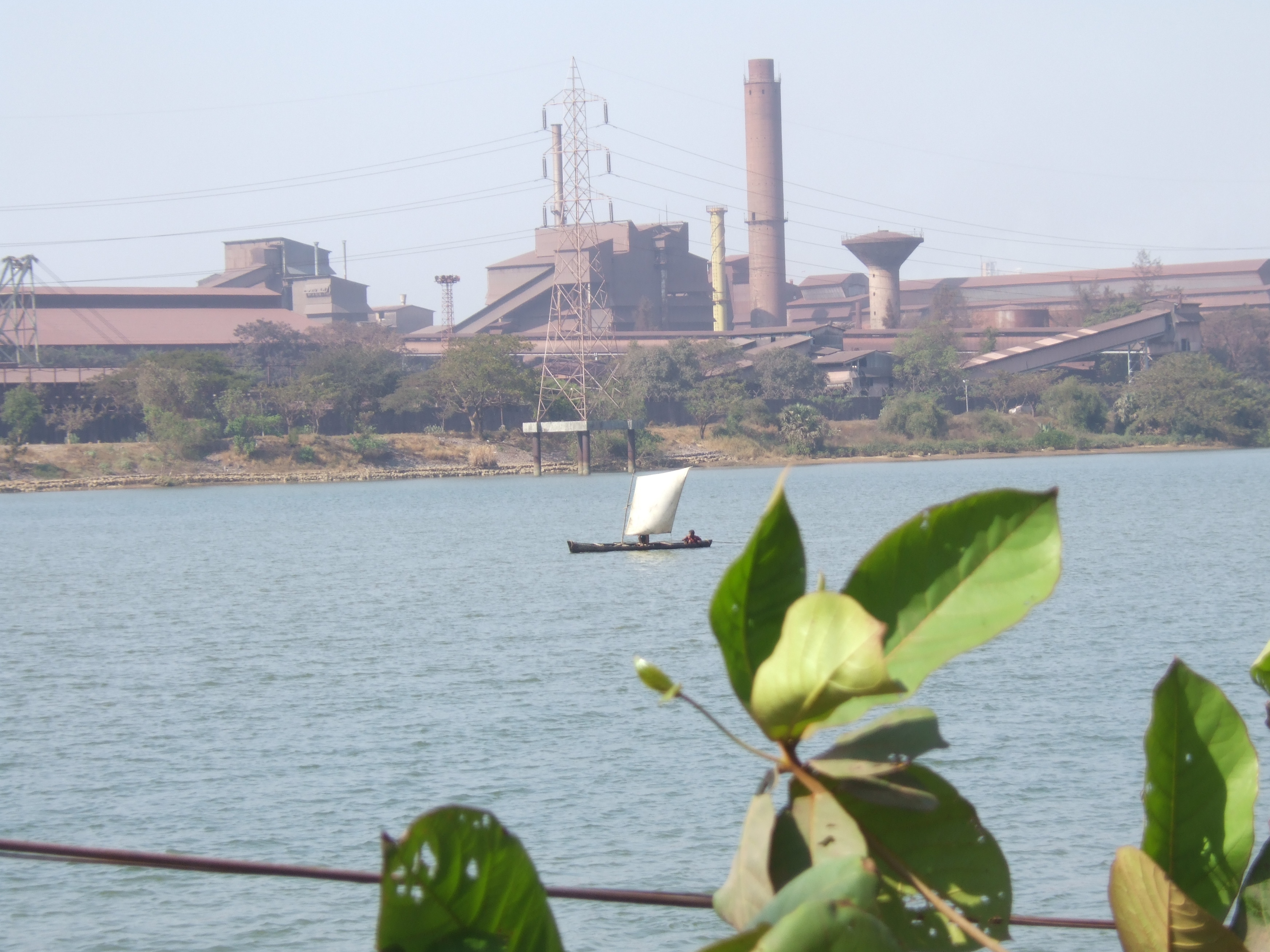
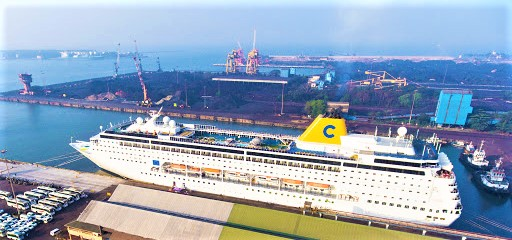
- Mangaluru CBD Skyline Kankanadi Falnir Mangalore Chemicals & Fertilizers Infosys campus MRPL Refinery KIOCL Pellet plant New Mangalore Port
- Interactive map of Mangaluru
- Location within Karnataka Location within India
- Coordinates: 12°52′18″N 74°50′33″E
- Country: India
- State: Karnataka
- District: Dakshina Kannada
- Taluk: Mangaluru
- Named for: Mangaladevi

Government
  - Type: Municipal Corporation
  - Body: Mangaluru City Corporation
  - Mayor: Manoj Kumar (BJP)
  - Deputy Mayor: P.S. Bhanumathi (BJP)

Area
  - Total: 170 km^{2} (66 sq mi)
- Elevation: 22 m (72 ft)

Population (2021)
  - Total: 724,159
  - Density: 4,250/km^{2} (11,000/sq mi)
- Demonym: Mangalorean

Languages
  - Administrative: Kannada, English,TULU
- Time zone: UTC+5:30 (IST)
- PIN: 575001 to 575030
- Telephone code: +91-(0824)
- Vehicle registration: KA-19, KA-62
- Sex ratio: 1.016
- Human Development Index: ▲0.83 (as of 2015) very high
- Literacy: 94.03%
- Website: www.mangalurucity.mrc.gov.in

Mangaluru (Kannada: [mɐŋɡɐɭuːru]), formerly called Mangalore (/ˈmæŋɡəlɔːr, ˌmæŋɡəˈlɔːr/ MANG-gə-lor, -LOR), is a major industrial port city in the Indian state of Karnataka and on the west coast of India. It is located between the Arabian Sea and the Western Ghats about 352 km (219 mi) west of Bengaluru, the state capital, 14 km (8 1/2 mi) north of the Karnataka–Kerala border and 297 km (185 mi) south of Goa. Mangaluru is the state's only city to have all four modes of transport—air, road, rail and sea. The population of the urban agglomeration was 619,664 according to the 2011 national census of India. It is known for being one of the locations of the Indian strategic petroleum reserves.

The city developed as a port in the Laccadive Sea during ancient times, and after Independence a new port was constructed in 1968 and has since become a major port of India that handles 75 percent of India's coffee and cashew exports. It is also the country's seventh largest container port. Mangaluru has been ruled by several major powers, including the Mauryan empire, Kadambas, Alupas, Vijayanagara Empire, and Keladi Nayaks. The city was a source of contention between the British and the Kingdom of Mysore rulers Hyder Ali and Tipu Sultan, and was eventually annexed by the British in 1799. Mangaluru remained part of the Madras Presidency until India's independence in 1947 and was unified with Mysore State (now called Karnataka) in 1956.

Mangaluru is one of the fastest developing cities in India. The Dakshina Kannada district, with its administrative headquarters at Mangaluru, has the highest per capita income and gross state domestic product in Karnataka after Bengaluru. It is a commercial, industrial, business, educational, healthcare, and startup hub. Mangaluru City Corporation is responsible for the civic administration which manages the 60 wards of the city. Its landscape is characterised by rolling hills, coconut palms, rivers, and hard laterite soil.

Mangaluru is included as one of the cities in the Smart Cities Mission list and is among the 100 smart cities to be developed in India. It has an average elevation of 22 m (72 ft) above mean sea level. It has a tropical monsoon climate and is under the influence of the southwest monsoon. It has its own international airport which is around 15 km (9.3 mi) from the city centre.

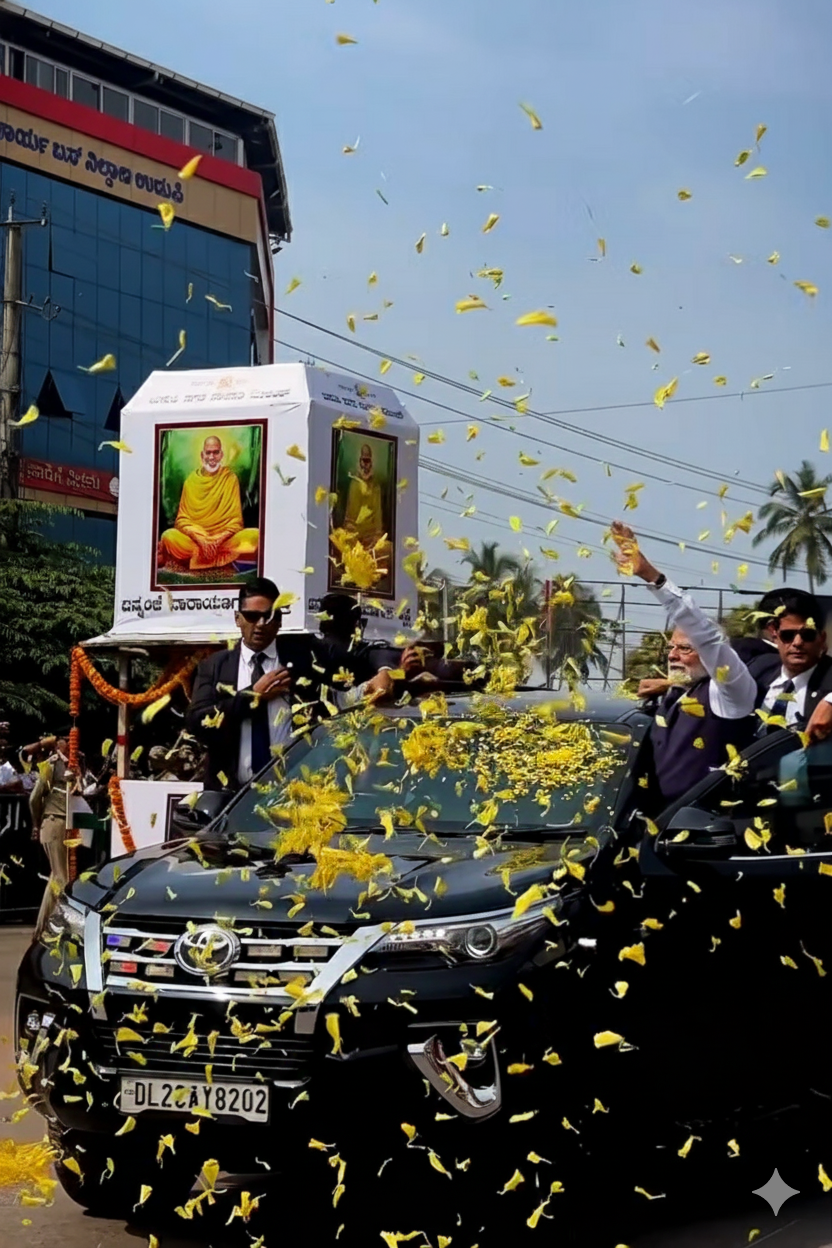
Narendra Modi at Brahmashree Narayana Guru Circle, Mangalore

== Etymology ==
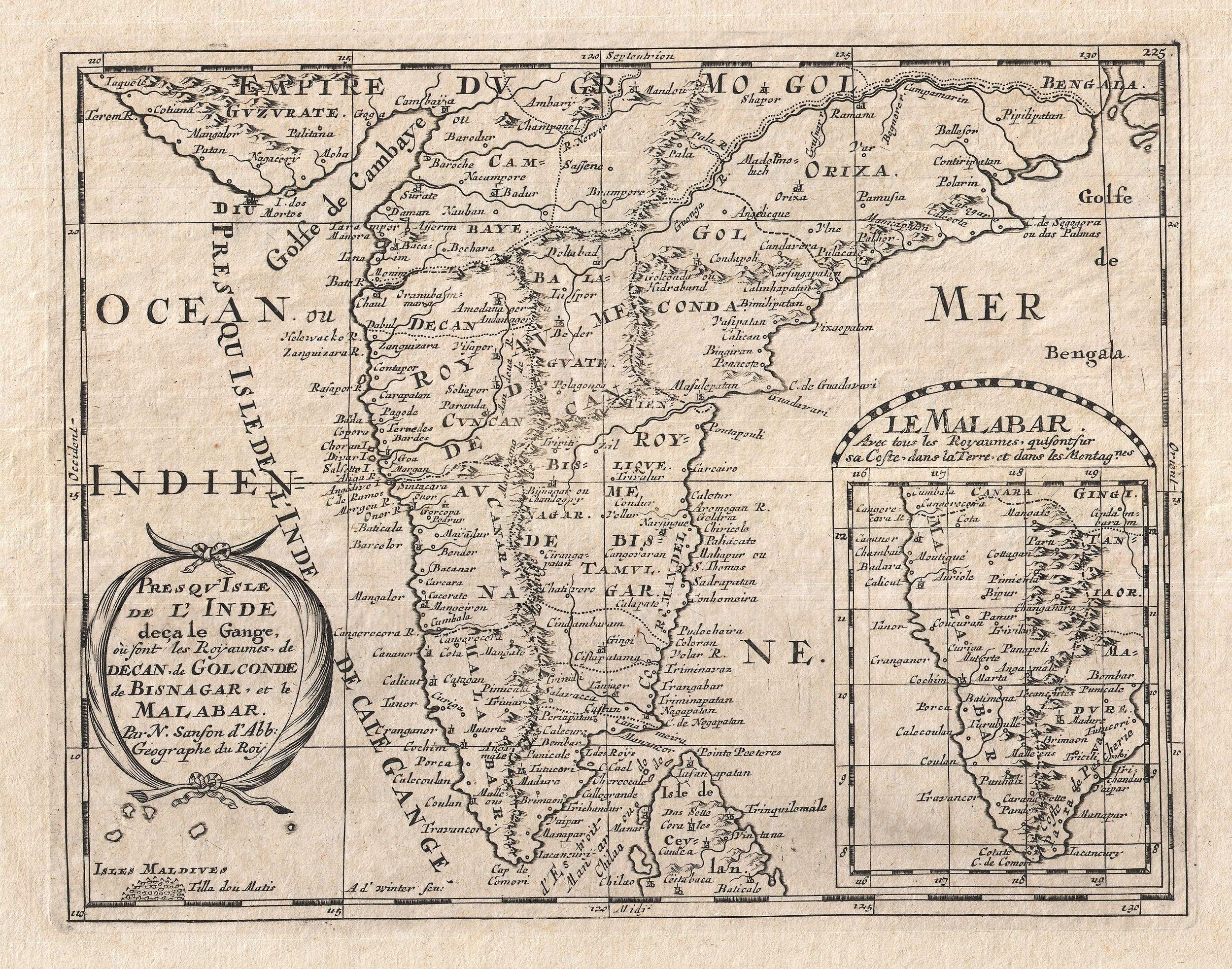
1652 Sanson Map of India

Mangaluru was named after the Hindu deity Mangaladevi, the presiding deity of the Mangaladevi Temple, ano the name of the goddess Tara of the Vajrayana Buddhist sect. According to local legend, a princess named Parimala or Premaladevi from Malabar renounced her title and became a disciple of Matsyendranath, the founder of the Nath tradition. Having converted Premaladevi to the Nath sect, Matsyendranath renamed her Mangaladevi. She arrived in the area with Matsyendranath, but had to settle near Bolar in Mangaluru because she fell ill on the way. When she died, the people consecrated the Mangaladevi temple at Bolar in her honour. The city was named for the temple.

One of the earliest references to the city's name was in 715 CE when Pandyan King Chettian called the city Mangalapuram. The city and the coastal region were part of the Pandyan Kingdom. According to K.V. Ramesh, president of the Place Names Society of India, Mangaluru was first used in 1345 CE during Vijayanagara rule. Many shilashasanas (stones) of the Vijayanagara period refer the city as Mangalapura. During the Alupa dynasty period, it was referred to as Mangalapura (Mangala means 'auspicious'). In the Kannada language, the city is known as Mangaluru, a reference to Mangaladevi (the suffix uru means town or city). Mangaluru was historically an important centre of Indian Ocean trade on the Malabar coast. Hence, it was also known by the name Manjalūr in Arabic. During British rule from 1799, the anglicised version Mangalore became the official appellation. According to historian George M. Moraes, however, the word Mangalore is the Portuguese corruption of Mangaluru. The city's name appears on maps as far back as the 1652 Sanson Map of India.

Mangaluru's diverse communities have different names for the city in their languages. In Tulu, which is the region's primary spoken language, the city is called Kudla (Tulu: [kuɖɭɐ]), meaning junction because it is situated at the confluence of the Netravati and Gurupura rivers. In Konkani, Mangaluru is referred to as Kodiyal (Konkani: [koɖijəl]), the Byari name for the city is Maikala (IPA: [mɐi̯kɐlɐ]), and in Malayalam, the city is called "Mangalapuram" (Malayalam: [mɐŋɡɐlaːpuɾɐm]), meaning auspicious city (the same mangala as in the Kannada term). Mangalore was officially renamed "Mangaluru" by the Karnataka government on 1 November 2014.

== History ==
=== Early and medieval history ===
Mangaluru's historical importance is highlighted by the many references to the city by foreign travellers. During the first century CE, the Roman historian Pliny the Elder referred to a place called "Nitrias" and said it was an undesirable place for disembarkation because of the pirates who frequented its vicinity, while Greek second-century historian Ptolemy referenced a place named "Nitra". These references were probably about an area with the Netravati River which flows through Mangalore. In his sixth-century work Christian Topography, Cosmas Indicopleustes (a Greek monk) mentions Malabar as being the chief seat of the pepper trade and Mangarouth (port of Mangaluru) as one of the five pepper markets which exported pepper.

According to Kerala Muslim tradition, the Masjid Zeenath Baksh in Mangalore is one of the oldest mosques in the Indian subcontinent. According to the Legend of Cheraman Perumals, the first Indian mosque was built in 624 AD in Kodungallur with the mandate of the last ruler (the Cheraman Perumal) of Chera dynasty, who left from Dharmadom to Mecca and converted to Islam during the lifetime of Muhammad (c. 570–632). According to Qissat Shakarwati Farmad, the Masjids at Kodungallur, Kollam, Madayi, Barkur, Mangaluru, Kasaragod, Kannur, Dharmadam, Panthalayani (Koyilandy), and Chaliyam, were built during the era of Malik Dinar; they are among the oldest Masjids in the Subcontinent. It is believed that Malik Dinar died at Thalangara in Kasaragod town. Three of the cities, Mangaluru, Barkur, and Kasaragod, are in Tulu Nadu.

Mangaluru is considered the heart of a distinct multi-linguistic cultural region, the homeland of the Tulu-speaking people. In the third century BCE, the town formed part of the Maurya Empire, which was ruled by the Buddhist emperor Ashoka of Magadha. From the third to the sixth century CE, the Kadamba dynasty, whose capital was based in Banavasi in North Canara, ruled over the entire Canara region as independent rulers. From the middle of the seventh century to the end of the 14th century, the South Canara region was ruled by its native Alupa rulers, who ruled over the region as feudatories of major regional dynasties like the Chalukyas of Badami, Rashtrakutas of Manyakheta, Chalukyas of Kalyani, and Hoysalas of Dwarasamudra. An Old Malayalam inscription (part of the Ramanthali inscriptions which date to 1075 CE), mentions king Kunda Alupa, the ruler of Alupa dynasty of Mangalore. It can be found at Ezhimala (the former headquarters of Mushika dynasty) near Cannanore, in the North Malabar region of Kerala.

During the 1130s and 1140s, during the reign of the Alupa king Kavi Alupendra (1110–1160), the city was home to the Tunisian Jewish merchant Abraham Ben Yiju. The Moroccan traveller Ibn Battuta, who visited Mangaluru in 1342, referred to it as Manjarur and stated the town was situated on a large estuary called the Estuary of the wolf, which was the greatest estuary in the country of Malabar. By 1345 the Vijayanagara rulers brought the region under their control.

During the Vijayanagara period (1345–1550), South Canara was divided into Mangaluru and Barkur rajyas (provinces), and two governors were appointed to look after each of them from Mangalore and Barkur. Often a single governor ruled over both Mangaluru and Barkur rajyas; when the authority passed to the Keladi rulers (1550–1763), they only had a governor at Barkur. In 1448, Abdur Razzaq who was the Persian ambassador of Sultan Shah Rukh of Samarkand, visited Mangaluru en route to the Vijayanagara court. The Italian traveller Ludovico di Varthema, who visited India in 1506, said he saw nearly sixty ships laden with rice ready to sail from the port of Mangalore.

=== Foundation and early modern history ===
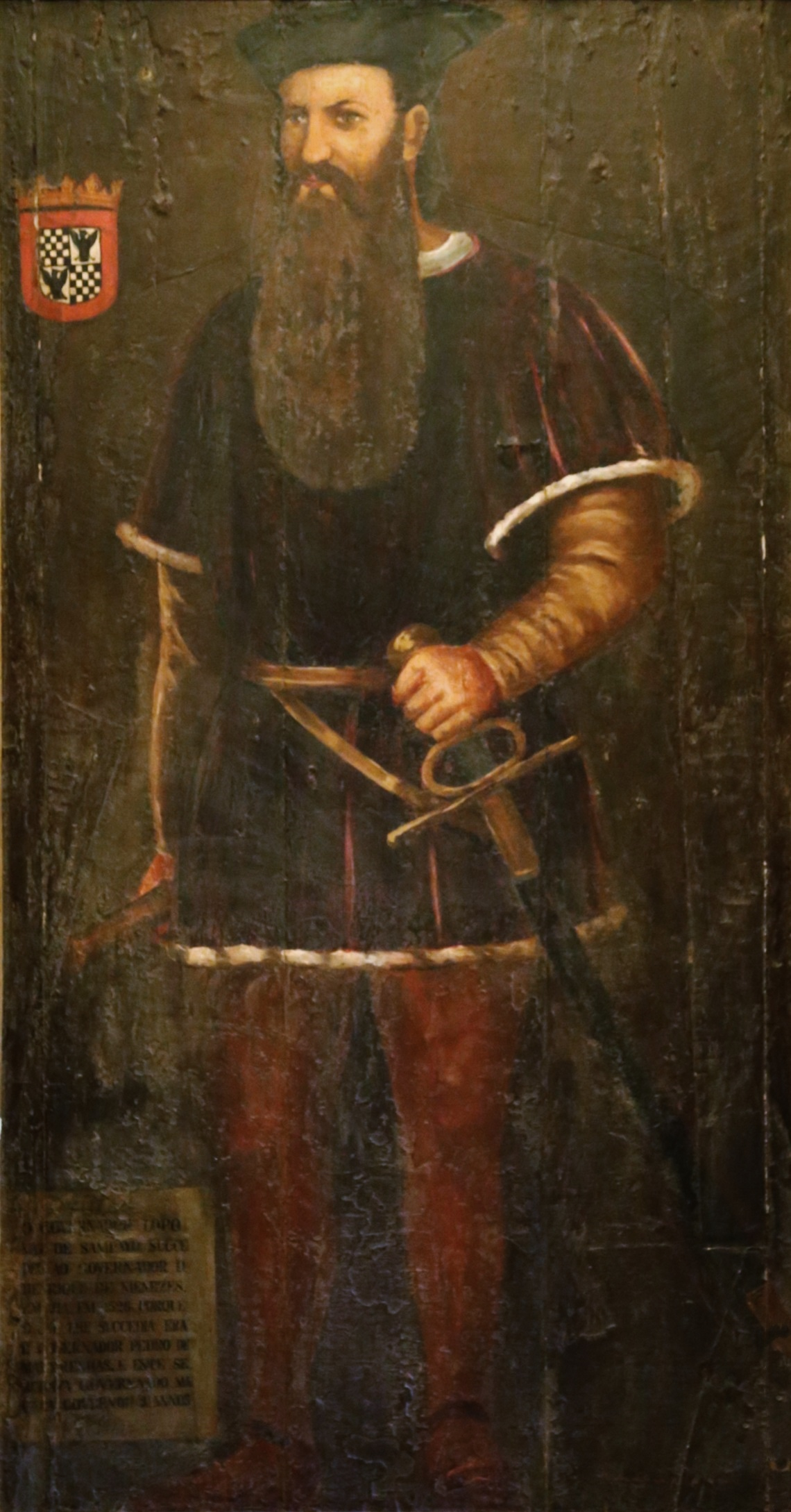
Lopo Vaz de Sampaio, Viceroy of Portuguese India, established Portuguese factories in Mangalore in 1526, which lasted until 1695.

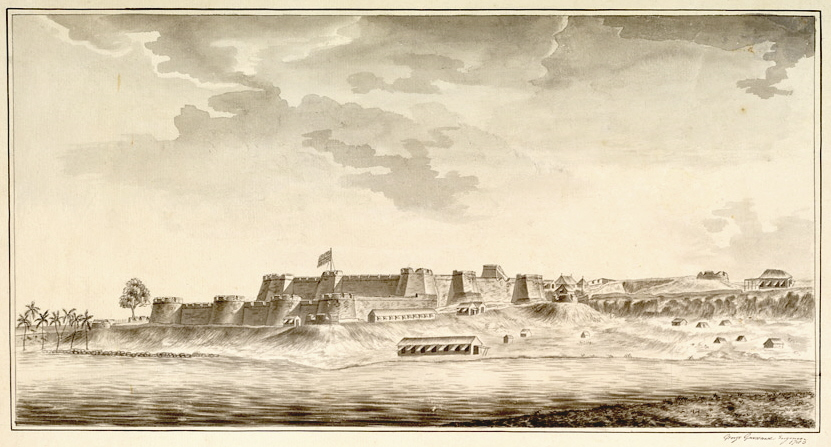
A pen and ink drawing of Mangalore Fort made in 1783, after it had been taken over by the British East India Company

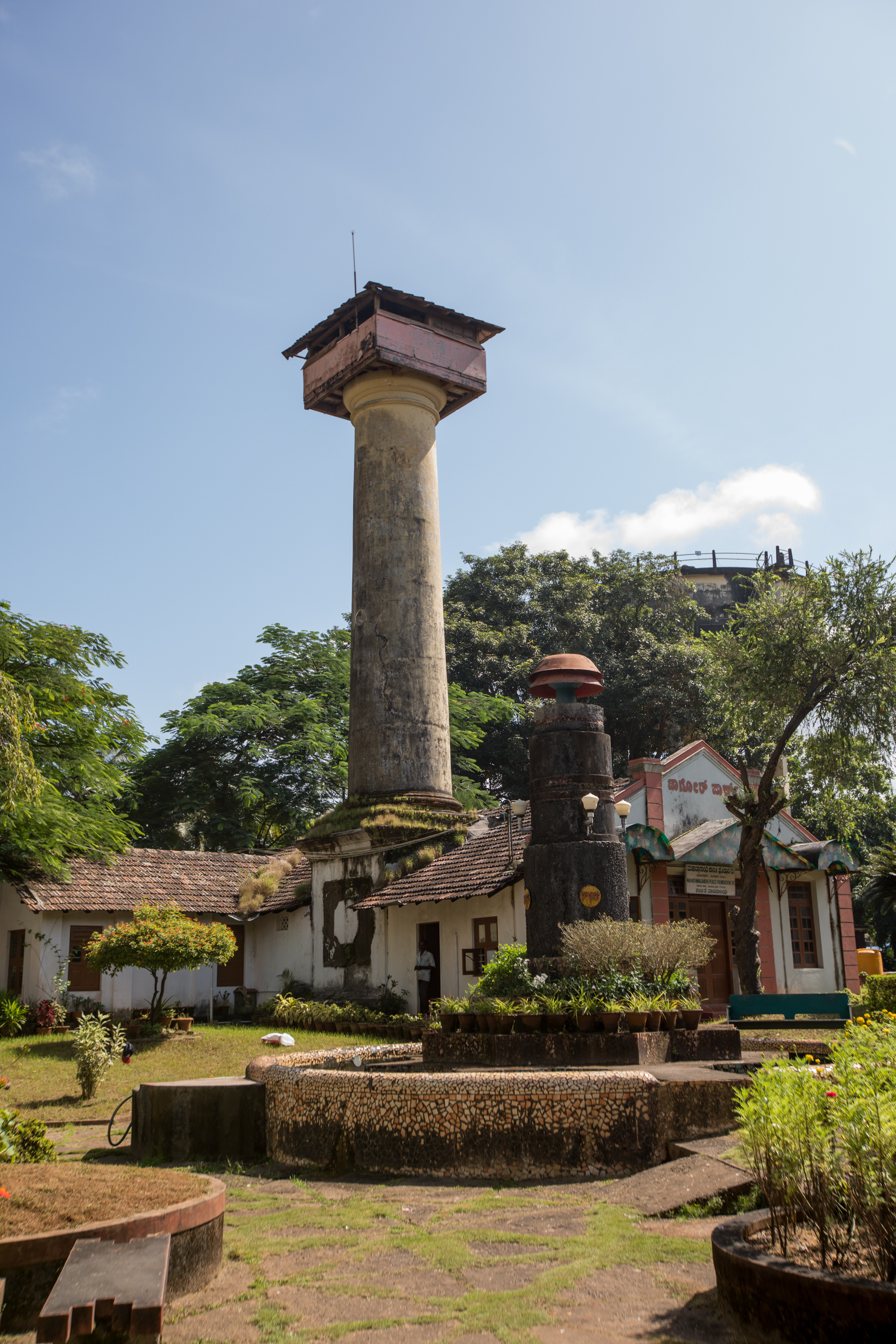
The tower at Light House Hill, Hampankatta, served as a lookout for the British.

In 1498, European influence in Mangaluru began when the Portuguese explorer Vasco da Gama landed at the nearby St Mary's Islands, just after his arrival at Koyilandy, Kozhikode. The Portuguese acquired many commercial interests in Canara in the 16th century. Krishnadevaraya (1509–1529), the ruler of the Vijaynagara empire maintained a friendly relationship with the Portuguese, whose trade slowly grew and they strove to destroy the coastal Arab and Mappila trade. In 1524, Vasco da Gama ordered the blockading of rivers after he heard the Muslim merchants of Kozhikode had agents at Mangaluru and Basrur. In 1526, the Portuguese under the viceroyship of Lopo Vaz de Sampaio took possession of Mangaluru. The coastal trade passed into Portuguese hands.

In 1550, the Vijayanagara ruler Sadashiva Raya entrusted to Sadashiv Nayaka of Keladi with administering the coastal region of Canara. By 1554, he established political authority over South Canara. The 16th century work Tuhfat Ul Mujahideen written by Zainuddin Makhdoom II appears to be the first historical work written in detail about the contemporary history of Mangaluru. It is written in Arabic and contains pieces of information about the resistance put up by the navy of Kunjali Marakkar alongside the Zamorin of Calicut from 1498 to 1583 against Portuguese attempts to colonize Tulu Nadu and Malabar coast.

After the disintegration of the Vijaynagara Empire in 1565, the rulers of Keladi attained greater power in dealing with the coastal Canara region. They continued the Vijayanagara administrative system and the provinces of Mangalore and Barkur continued to exist. The governor of Mangaluru also acted as the governor of the Keladi army in his province. The Italian traveller Pietro Della Valle visited here in 1623–1624. In 1695, Arabs burnt the town in retaliation to Portuguese restrictions on Arab trade.

In 1763, Hyder Ali, the de facto ruler of the Kingdom of Mysore, conquered Mangaluru, which was brought under his administration until 1767. Mangaluru was ruled by the British East India Company from 1767 to 1783, but Hyder Ali's son Tipu Sultan took it from their control in 1783 and renamed it "Jalalabad". The Second Anglo–Mysore War ended with the signing of the Treaty of Mangalore by Tipu Sultan and the British East India Company on 11 March 1784. After the defeat of Tipu at the Fourth Anglo–Mysore War, the city remained under British control. South Canara district was the headquarters under the Madras Presidency.

Francis Buchanan, a Scottish physician who visited Mangalore in 1801, said the city was a prosperous port with plentiful trade. The main commodity of export was rice; it went to Muscat, Bombay, Goa, and Malabar. Supari (Betel-nut) was exported to Bombay, Surat, and Kutch. Sandalwood and black pepper were exported to Bombay.

Local capital was mainly invested in land and money lending, leading to the regional development of banking because the British colonial government did not support industrialisation there. After European missionaries arrived in the early 19th century, educational institutions and modern industries modelled on European ones were developed in the region. The opening of the Lutheran Swiss Basel Mission in 1834 was an important step towards industrialisation. Missionaries set up printing presses, textile mills and factories that made Mangalore tiles. When Canara (part of the Madras Presidency until this time) was split into North Canara and South Canara in 1859, Mangalore became the headquarters of South Canara, which remained under Madras Presidency while in 1862, North Canara was transferred to the Bombay Presidency.

=== Later modern and contemporary history ===
On 23 May 1866, a municipal council for Mangaluru with responsibility for civic amenities and urban planning was mandated by the Madras Town Improvement Act (1865). The Italian Jesuits who arrived in the city in 1878, played an important role in the city's education, economy, health, and social welfare. Mangaluru was linked to the Southern Railway in 1907 and the subsequent proliferation of motor vehicles in India further increased trade and communication between the city and the rest of the country. Mangaluru was a major source of educated workers to Bombay, Bengaluru, and the Middle East by the early 20th century.

The States Reorganisation Act (1956) led to Mangaluru being incorporated into the newly created Mysore State, which was later renamed Karnataka. Mangaluru is the seventh-largest port of India, giving the state access to the Laccadive Sea coastline. Between 1970 and 1980, Mangalore experienced significant growth with the opening of New Mangalore Port in 1974 and commissioning of Mangalore Chemicals & Fertilizers Limited in 1976. The late 20th and early 21st centuries saw Mangaluru develop as a commercial and petrochemical hub.

== Geography ==
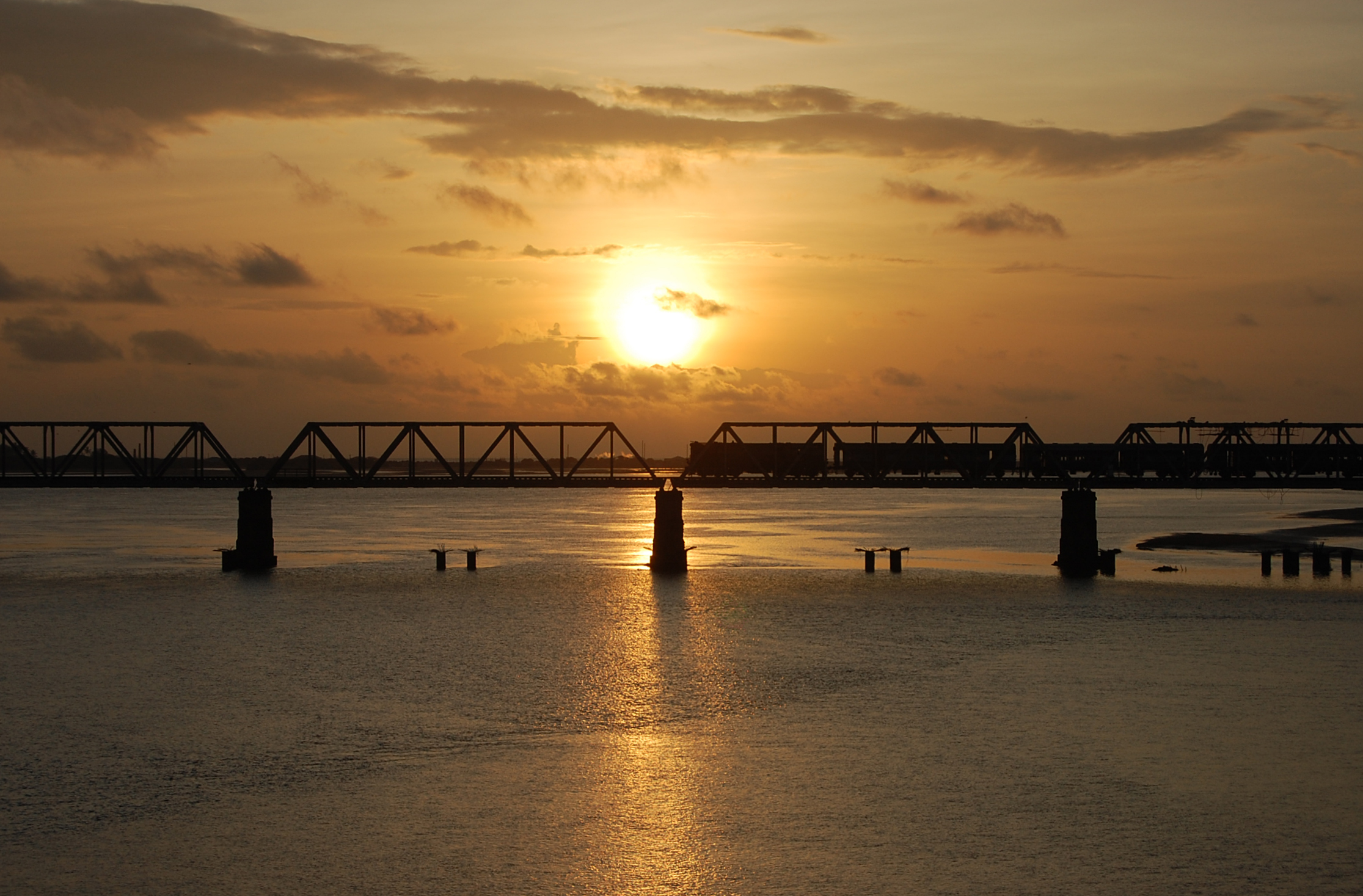
Sunset at Netravati Bridge

Mangaluru is located on the western coast of India at 12.87°N 74.88°E in Dakshina Kannada district, Karnataka state. It has an average elevation of 22 m (72 ft) above mean sea level. The city is the administrative headquarters of Dakshina Kannada district and is the state's largest coastal urban centre.

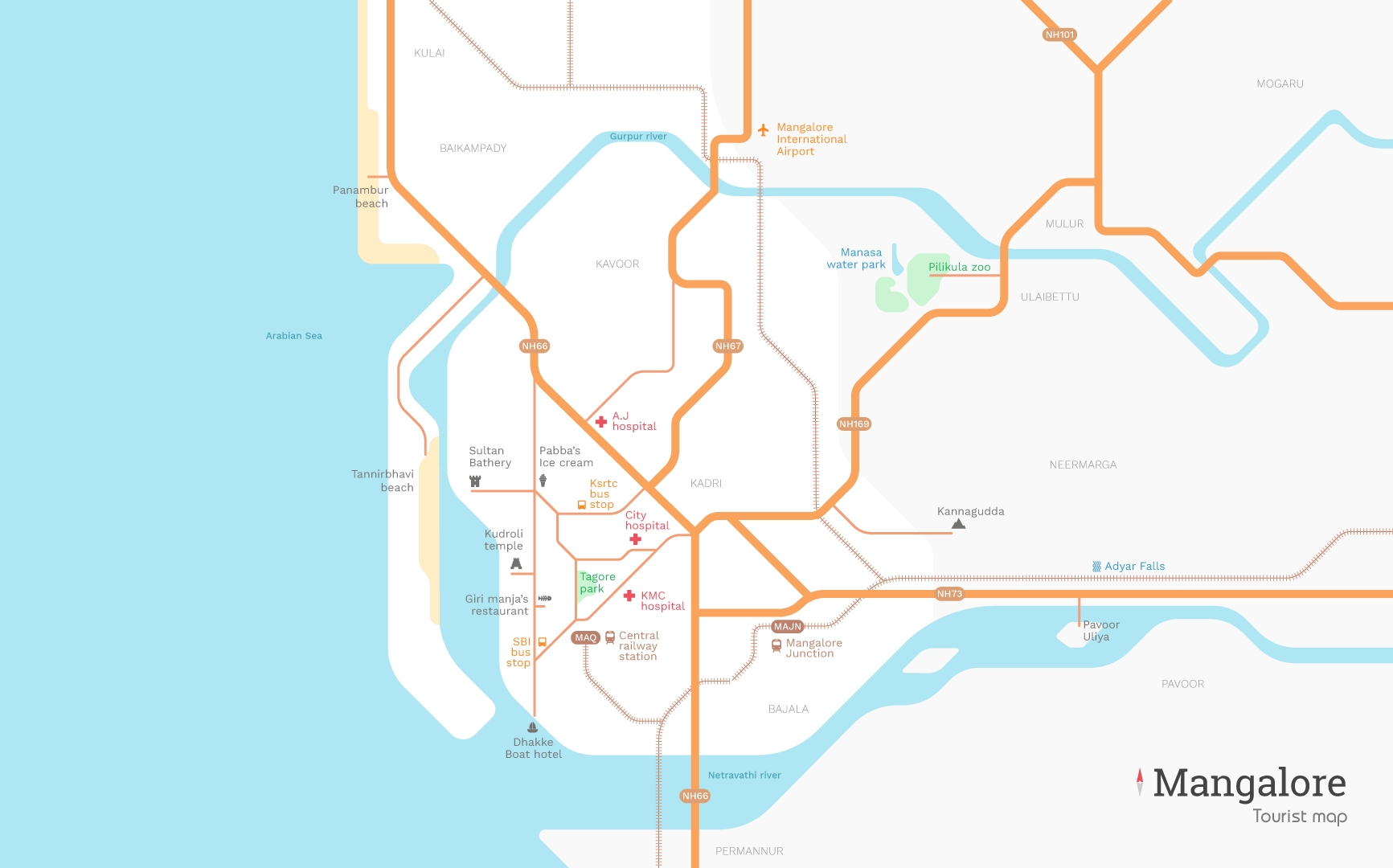
A schematic map showing tourist attractions in Mangaluru city

Mangaluru is bounded by the Laccadive Sea to its west and by the Western Ghats to its east. As a municipal entity the city spans 170 km^{2} (65.64 sq mi). The Netravati and Gurupura rivers encircle the city; the Gurupura flows around the north and the Netravati flows around the south of the city. The rivers form an estuary in the south-western region of the city, from where they flow into the Laccadive Sea. Coconut, palm, and ashoka trees comprise the primary vegetation of the city.

The city's topography consists of a plain that stretches up to 30 km (18.64 mi) from the coast and undulating, hilly terrain towards the east near the Western Ghats. The local geology is characterised by hard laterite in hilly tracts and sandy soil along the seashore. The Geological Survey of India has identified Mangalore as a moderately earthquake-prone urban centre and categorised the city in the Seismic III Zone.

=== Climate ===
Under the Köppen climate classification, Mangaluru has a tropical monsoon climate and is under the direct influence of the Laccadive Sea branch of the southwest monsoon. It receives about 95 percent of its total annual rainfall between May and September but remains extremely dry from December to March. Humidity is approximately 75 percent on average and peaks during June, July and August. The maximum average humidity is 93 percent in July and average minimum humidity is 56 percent in January. Mangaluru experiences moderate to gusty winds during day time and gentle winds at night. The driest and least humid months are from December to February. During this time of year temperatures during the day stay below 34 °C (93 °F) and drop to about 19 °C (66 °F) at night. The lowest temperature recorded at Panambur is 15.6 °C (60 °F) on 8 January 1992 and at Bajpe it is 15.9 °C (61 °F) on 19 November 1974. According to the India Meteorological Department (IMD), the temperature in Mangaluru has never reached 40 °C (104 °F). The summer gives way to the monsoon season, when the city experiences the highest precipitation of all urban centres in India due to the influence of the Western Ghats. The rains subside in September but there is occasional rainfall in October. The highest rainfall recorded in a 24-hour period is 330.8 mm (13 in) on 22 June 2003. In 1994, Mangaluru recorded its highest annual rainfall at 5,018.52 mm (198 in).

Climate data for Mangaluru (1961–1990, extremes 1901–1981)
Month	Jan	Feb	Mar	Apr	May	Jun	Jul	Aug	Sep	Oct	Nov	Dec	Year
Record high °C (°F)	36.3 (97.3)	37.8 (100.0)	37.4 (99.3)	36.6 (97.9)	36.7 (98.1)	34.4 (93.9)	35.6 (96.1)	32.2 (90.0)	34.6 (94.3)	35.0 (95.0)	35.6 (96.1)	35.6 (96.1)	37.8 (100.0)
Mean daily maximum °C (°F)	31.7 (89.1)	31.7 (89.1)	31.9 (89.4)	32.8 (91.0)	32.3 (90.1)	29.9 (85.8)	28.6 (83.5)	28.5 (83.3)	29.2 (84.6)	30.4 (86.7)	31.7 (89.1)	32.0 (89.6)	30.9 (87.6)
Mean daily minimum °C (°F)	21.7 (71.1)	22.7 (72.9)	24.4 (75.9)	25.7 (78.3)	25.4 (77.7)	23.7 (74.7)	23.1 (73.6)	23.1 (73.6)	23.1 (73.6)	23.4 (74.1)	23.0 (73.4)	22.4 (72.3)	23.5 (74.3)
Record low °C (°F)	16.7 (62.1)	16.7 (62.1)	18.3 (64.9)	20.0 (68.0)	18.9 (66.0)	18.4 (65.1)	18.0 (64.4)	19.8 (67.6)	19.0 (66.2)	18.8 (65.8)	17.6 (63.7)	16.7 (62.1)	16.7 (62.1)
Average rainfall mm (inches)	0.2 (0.01)	3.6 (0.14)	2.5 (0.10)	35.0 (1.38)	199.5 (7.85)	955.8 (37.63)	1,160.3 (45.68)	792.6 (31.20)	331.5 (13.05)	184.0 (7.24)	75.2 (2.96)	33.9 (1.33)	3,774.1 (148.59)
Average rainy days	0.0	0.0	0.1	2.0	7.2	24.5	29.4	25.4	15.3	10.1	4.4	1.3	119.7
Average relative humidity (%) (at 17:30 IST)	65	68	70	71	73	82	86	85	83	80	71	67	75
Source: India Meteorological Department

Climate data for Mangaluru, India (Panambur) 1991–2020, extremes 1968–present
Month	Jan	Feb	Mar	Apr	May	Jun	Jul	Aug	Sep	Oct	Nov	Dec	Year
Record high °C (°F)	36.9 (98.4)	38.8 (101.8)	38.1 (100.6)	35.9 (96.6)	36.8 (98.2)	34.9 (94.8)	32.5 (90.5)	31.8 (89.2)	33.8 (92.8)	35.9 (96.6)	36.8 (98.2)	36.9 (98.4)	38.8 (101.8)
Mean daily maximum °C (°F)	33.2 (91.8)	33.2 (91.8)	33.5 (92.3)	34.1 (93.4)	33.5 (92.3)	30.2 (86.4)	29.0 (84.2)	29.0 (84.2)	29.9 (85.8)	31.2 (88.2)	33.0 (91.4)	33.4 (92.1)	31.9 (89.4)
Mean daily minimum °C (°F)	21.3 (70.3)	22.3 (72.1)	24.3 (75.7)	25.6 (78.1)	25.5 (77.9)	24.1 (75.4)	23.6 (74.5)	23.7 (74.7)	23.8 (74.8)	23.8 (74.8)	23.3 (73.9)	21.7 (71.1)	23.6 (74.5)
Record low °C (°F)	15.6 (60.1)	17.5 (63.5)	18.7 (65.7)	19.2 (66.6)	20.3 (68.5)	19.8 (67.6)	19.6 (67.3)	20.1 (68.2)	20.1 (68.2)	19.1 (66.4)	16.6 (61.9)	15.6 (60.1)	15.6 (60.1)
Average rainfall mm (inches)	2.5 (0.10)	0.1 (0.00)	4.2 (0.17)	33.2 (1.31)	189.2 (7.45)	999.4 (39.35)	1,015.8 (39.99)	687.3 (27.06)	344.5 (13.56)	234.2 (9.22)	76.7 (3.02)	14.4 (0.57)	3,601.4 (141.79)
Average rainy days	0.2	0.0	0.2	2.2	7.2	23.4	27.5	24.6	15.1	9.9	4.0	0.8	115.1
Average relative humidity (%) (at 17:30 IST)	61	62	65	66	70	84	87	87	83	79	71	62	73
Source: India Meteorological Department

Climate data for Mangaluru, India (Mangalore International Airport) 1991–2020, extremes 1956–2020
Month	Jan	Feb	Mar	Apr	May	Jun	Jul	Aug	Sep	Oct	Nov	Dec	Year
Record high °C (°F)	36.8 (98.2)	38.2 (100.8)	39.8 (103.6)	37.8 (100.0)	38.0 (100.4)	36.4 (97.5)	33.3 (91.9)	33.3 (91.9)	35.4 (95.7)	35.2 (95.4)	36.6 (97.9)	36.0 (96.8)	39.8 (103.6)
Mean daily maximum °C (°F)	33.2 (91.8)	33.6 (92.5)	34.0 (93.2)	34.3 (93.7)	33.5 (92.3)	30.0 (86.0)	28.7 (83.7)	28.8 (83.8)	30.0 (86.0)	31.2 (88.2)	32.8 (91.0)	33.1 (91.6)	31.9 (89.4)
Mean daily minimum °C (°F)	21.0 (69.8)	22.0 (71.6)	23.8 (74.8)	25.0 (77.0)	25.0 (77.0)	23.6 (74.5)	23.0 (73.4)	23.1 (73.6)	23.2 (73.8)	23.3 (73.9)	22.8 (73.0)	21.6 (70.9)	23.1 (73.6)
Record low °C (°F)	16.1 (61.0)	17.3 (63.1)	18.8 (65.8)	19.7 (67.5)	20.4 (68.7)	20.5 (68.9)	19.8 (67.6)	19.4 (66.9)	20.2 (68.4)	19.1 (66.4)	15.9 (60.6)	16.1 (61.0)	15.9 (60.6)
Average rainfall mm (inches)	0.6 (0.02)	0.0 (0.0)	4.7 (0.19)	34.3 (1.35)	169.8 (6.69)	1,033.8 (40.70)	1,095.8 (43.14)	743.5 (29.27)	341.1 (13.43)	230.5 (9.07)	80.7 (3.18)	12.8 (0.50)	3,747.6 (147.54)
Average rainy days	0.1	0.0	0.3	2.1	6.3	23.5	28.1	25.4	15.0	9.9	4.0	0.8	115.5
Average relative humidity (%) (at 17:30 IST)	55	58	62	64	67	83	86	85	80	78	69	57	70
Mean monthly sunshine hours	303.8	257.1	269.7	258.0	220.1	99.0	55.8	89.9	156.0	186.0	213.0	269.7	2,378.1
Mean daily sunshine hours	9.8	9.1	8.7	8.6	7.1	3.3	1.8	2.9	5.2	6.0	7.1	8.7	6.5
Source: India Meteorological Department (sun 1971–2000)

== Economy ==
Industrial, commercial, agricultural processing, and port-related activities comprise this city's economy. The Dakshina Kannada district, with its administrative headquarters at Mangaluru, has the highest per capita income and gross state domestic product in Karnataka after Bengaluru. The New Mangalore Port is India's seventh-largest container port. It handles 75 percent of India's coffee exports and the bulk of its cashew nuts. The Mangalore Customs Commissionerate collected a revenue of ₹4.47 billion (US$46.42 million) during 2012–13 and ₹27.91 billion (US$289.82 million) during December 2018. During 2012–13, MRPL and MCF contributed ₹501 million (US$5.20 million) and ₹373 million (US$3.87 million), respectively, to the state's revenue. Dakshina Kannada district has the highest percentage of workers employed in industry and the second-highest industry-to-district GDP ratio in Karnataka. Imports through New Mangalore port include crude oil, edible oil, liquefied petroleum gas, and timber.

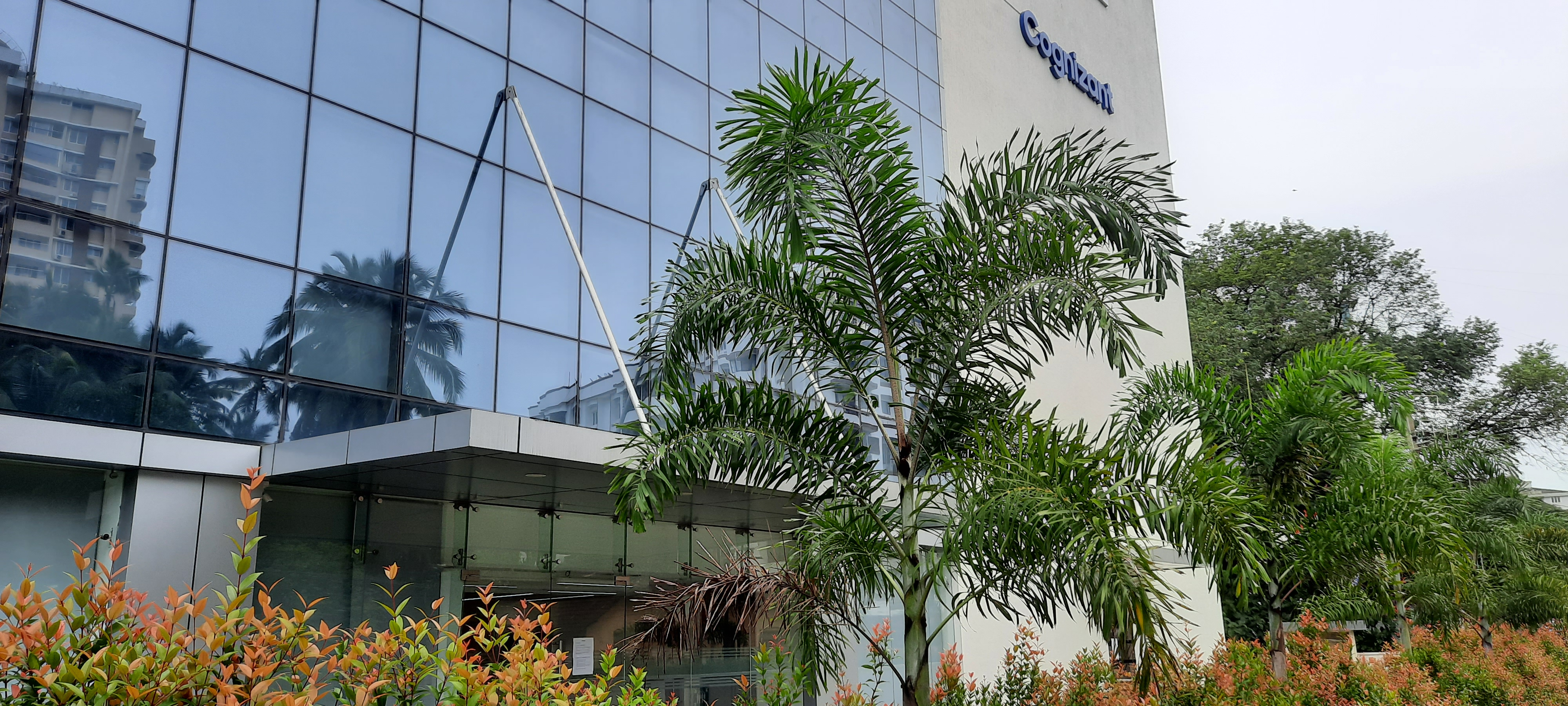
Cognizant campus in Mangaluru

The city's major chemical industries include BASF, Mangalore Refinery and Petrochemicals Ltd. (MRPL), Mangalore Chemicals and Fertilizers (MCF), Kudremukh Iron Ore Company Ltd. (KIOCL), Hindustan Petroleum Corporation Ltd. (HPCL), Bharat Petroleum Corporation Ltd. (BPCL), Indian Oil Corporation Ltd. (IOCL), Total Oil India Ltd., and Hindustan Unilever. The Indian government has built 5.33 million tons of strategic crude oil storage at Mangaluru and Padur to ensure energy security. Out of the 5 million metric tonnes (MMT) storage, 1.5 MMT is stored at Mangaluru. Bharati Shipyard Ltd. (BSL) (now known as Bharati Defence and Infrastructure Ltd.) has established a shipbuilding site near Tannirbavi in Mangaluru. Global inspection, testing, verification and certification companies such as SGS and Bureau Veritas have their offices in Mangaluru.

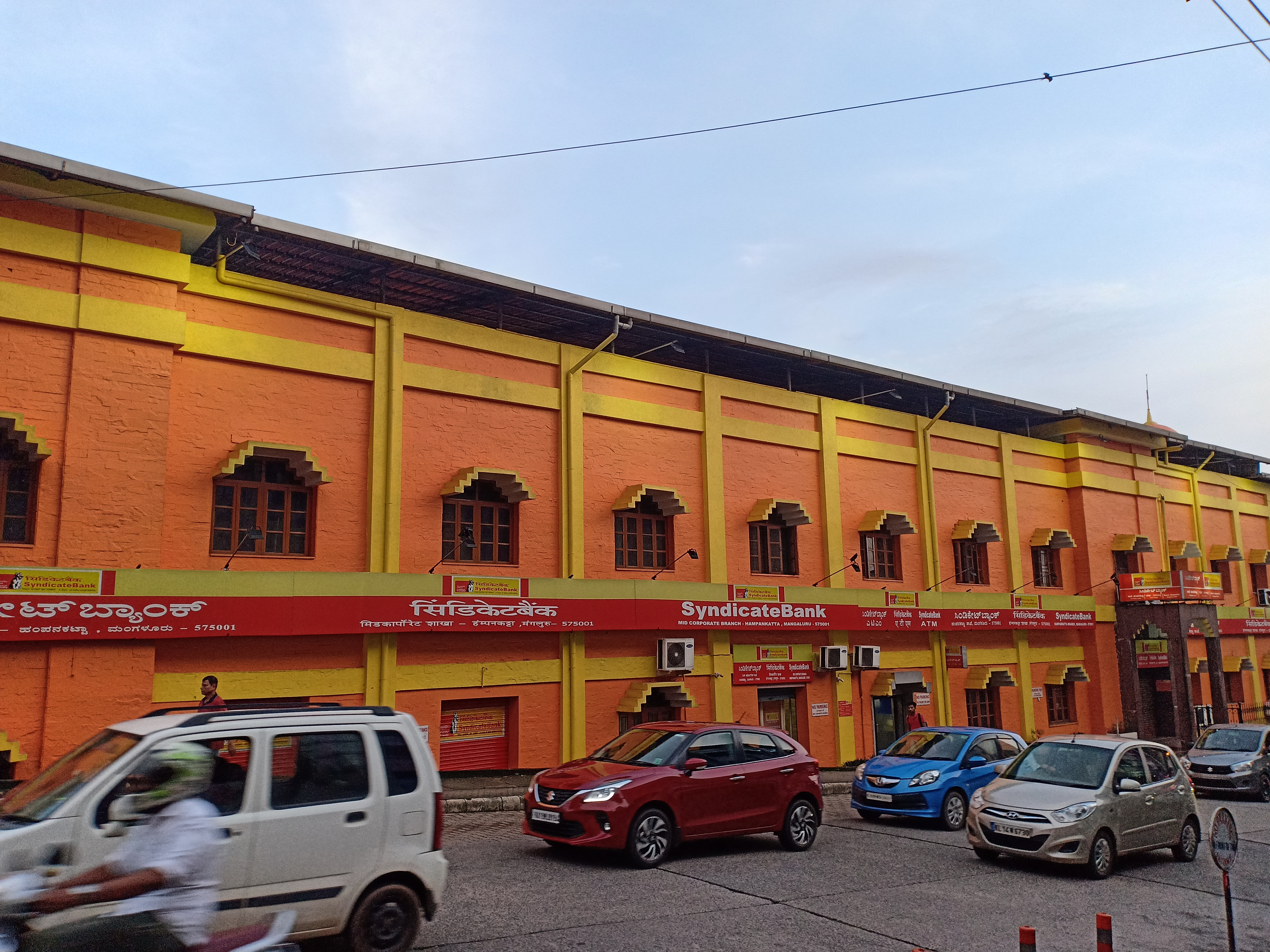
Syndicate Bank at Hampankatta

Major information technology (IT) and outsourcing companies like Infosys, Cognizant, and Thomson Reuters have their offices at Mangaluru. Mphasis' Business Process Outsourcing (BPO) has a branch in this city. IT parks Export Promotion Investment Park (EPIP) at Ganjimutt and Special Economic Zone (SEZ) near Mangalore University have been constructed. An IT park called Soorya Infratech park is situated in Mudipu. Tata Consultancy Services (TCS) has planned to invest ₹500 crore (US$51.92 million) and set up its office at Karnad near Mangalore. KEONICS has planned to build an IT park at Derebail in Mangaluru, similar to Electronic City, spanning an area of 100 acres.

Centre for Entrepreneurship Opportunities and Learning (CEOL) is a startup incubation centre situated in the city. Corporation Bank, Canara Bank, and Vijaya Bank were the three nationalised banks established in Mangaluru during the first half of the 20th century. Mangaluru is the headquarters of Corporation Bank and Karnataka Bank. The Mangalore Catholic Co-operative Bank (MCC Bank), Mangalore Cooperative Town Bank, and SCDCC Bank were the scheduled banks established in Mangaluru.

Syngene International which is a contract research arm of Biocon, has set up its manufacturing plant at Mangaluru. Old Mangalore Port is a fishing port located at Bunder, Mangaluru, where a large number of mechanised boats anchor. The traffic at this port was 122,000 tonnes during 2003–04, which increased to 74,390 tonnes by 2019-20. New Mangalore Port handled over 100,000 twenty-foot equivalent units of containers during the years 2017–18. Fishing is a traditional occupation and the products are sold in the surrounding regions. Mangalorean firms have a major presence in the tile, beedi, coffee and cashew nut industries although the tile industry has declined because concrete is preferred in modern construction. The Albuquerque tile factory in Mangalore is one of India's oldest red-roof-tile manufacturing factories. The city's suburb Ullal produces hosiery and coir yarns while beedi rolling is an important source of revenue to many of the city's residents.

== Demographics ==
Population Growth
Year	Pop.	±%
1921	66,400	—
1931	73,600	+10.8%
1941	85,500	+16.2%
1951	110,750	+29.5%
1961	145,300	+31.2%
1971	210,400	+44.8%
1981	305,200	+45.1%
1991	425,600	+39.4%
2001	512,100	+20.3%
2011	619,600	+21.0%
2021	724,159	+16.9%
Source: Census of India

Religions in Mangalore (2011 census)
Religion	Percent
Hinduism	68.99%
Islam	17.40%
Christianity	13.15%
Jainism	0.21%
Other or not stated	0.12%
Distribution of religions †Includes Sikhism (0.08%), Buddhism (0.05%).

Distribution of languages in Mangaluru
1. Tulu (39.2%)
2. Konkani (16.4%)
3. Kannada (15.1%)
4. Beary (13.1%)
5. Malayalam (6.39%)
6. Urdu (2.52%)
7. Hindi (2.10%)
8. Tamil (1.91%)
9. Telugu (0.96%)
10. Others (2.23%)

In 2021 the population of Mangaluru city was 724,159. According to the 2011 Indian census, the male literacy rate was 96.49 percent and the female literacy rate was 91.63 percent. About 8.5 percent of the population was under the age of six years. The death rate and Infant mortality rate were at 3.7 percent and 1.2 percent respectively. About 7726 people lived in slums in Mangaluru city which was 1.55 percent of the total population. The Human Development Index (HDI) of Mangaluru city was 0.83 in 2015.

=== Religions ===
Hinduism is the largest religion in Mangaluru, and Devadiga, Mogaveera, Billavas, Ganigas, Bunts, Vishwakarma, Padmashali, Brahmins, and Daivadnyas are the major communities among Hindus. Christians form a sizeable section of Mangalurean society; Mangalorean Catholics comprise the city's largest Christian community. Protestants in Mangalore typically speak Tulu and Kannada. Anglo-Indians were also part of the Mangalurean Christian Community. Mangaluru has one of the highest percentage of Muslims in Karnataka cities. Most Muslims in Mangalore are Bearys who speak the Beary language. Most of them follow the Shafi'i school of Fiqh (Islamic Jurisprudence). Mangaluru also has a small group of Urdu-speaking Dakhini Muslims. The Masjid Zeenath Baksh at Mangaluru is one of the oldest mosques in the Indian subcontinent. Mangaluru contains a Gurdwara and Baháʼí prayer centre established in 1972.

=== Languages ===
Mangaluru is a multi-lingual city where several prominent regional languages such as Tulu, Konkani, Kannada, and Beary are spoken. The city is known as Kudla in Tulu, Kodial in Konkani, Maikāla in Beary, Mangalapuram in Malayalam, and Mangaluru in Kannada. Among most of the residents of the city, Kudla is the most commonly used name to refer to it. There are also smaller communities of Tuluva Jains, Gujaratis, Tamils, and Marathis. Tulu is a predominant language in Mangaluru and Kannada is the administrative language of Mangaluru, but the city is multi-cultural. According to the 2011 census, Tulu is spoken as a first language by 39.24% of the population, Konkani by 16.42%, Kannada by 15.11%, Beary by 13.13%, Malayalam by 6.39%, Urdu by 2.52%, Hindi by 2.10%, Tamil by 1.91%, Telugu by 0.96%, and other languages are spoken by 2.23%. Unlike other cities in Karnataka where Kannada is a primary language, Kannada is the third most spoken language, Tulu is the predominant language in Mangaluru, and Konkani is the second most spoken language in Mangaluru.

== Government and public services ==
=== Civic administration ===
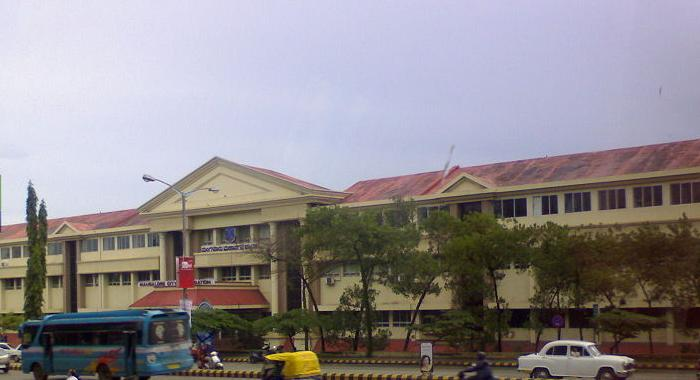
Mangaluru City Corporation at Lalbagh

Mangaluru has a city area of 170 km^{2} (65.64 sq mi). Municipal limits begin at Surathkal in the north, Netravati River bridge in the south, the western coast, and Vamanjoor in the east. Mangaluru City Corporation (MCC) came into existence in 1980; it is the municipal corporation in charge of the city's civic and infrastructural assets. The MCC council consists of 60 elected representatives called corporators, one from each of the city's 60 wards. A corporator from the ruling majority party is selected to be the mayor. MCC's headquarters are at Lalbagh. Mangaluru Urban Development Authority (MUDA) manages the planning, urban growth, and expansion of the city. The District Commissioner is the chairperson of MUDA. The 44 projects which are listed as part of the Smart Cities Mission programme are managed by Mangaluru Smart City Limited (MSCL).

Until the Delimitation commission's revised the Lok Sabha and the legislative constituencies, Mangaluru contributed two members to the Lok Sabha; one for the southern part of the city that fell under the Mangalore Lok Sabha constituency and another for the northern part of the city that fell under the Udupi Lok Sabha constituency. After the delimitation of parliamentary constituencies in 2008, Mangalore Lok Sabha constituency was replaced with Dakshina Kannada Lok Sabha constituency, resulting in Mangalore being represented by one Member of Parliament (MP). Additionally, Mangaluru sends three members to the Karnataka Legislative Assembly from Mangalore City South, Mangalore City North, and Mangalore. The Mangaluru City Police Department is headed by a Commissioner of Police. Mangaluru is also the headquarters of the Western Range Police, which covers the western districts of Karnataka and is headed by an Inspector General of Police (IGP).

=== Healthcare ===
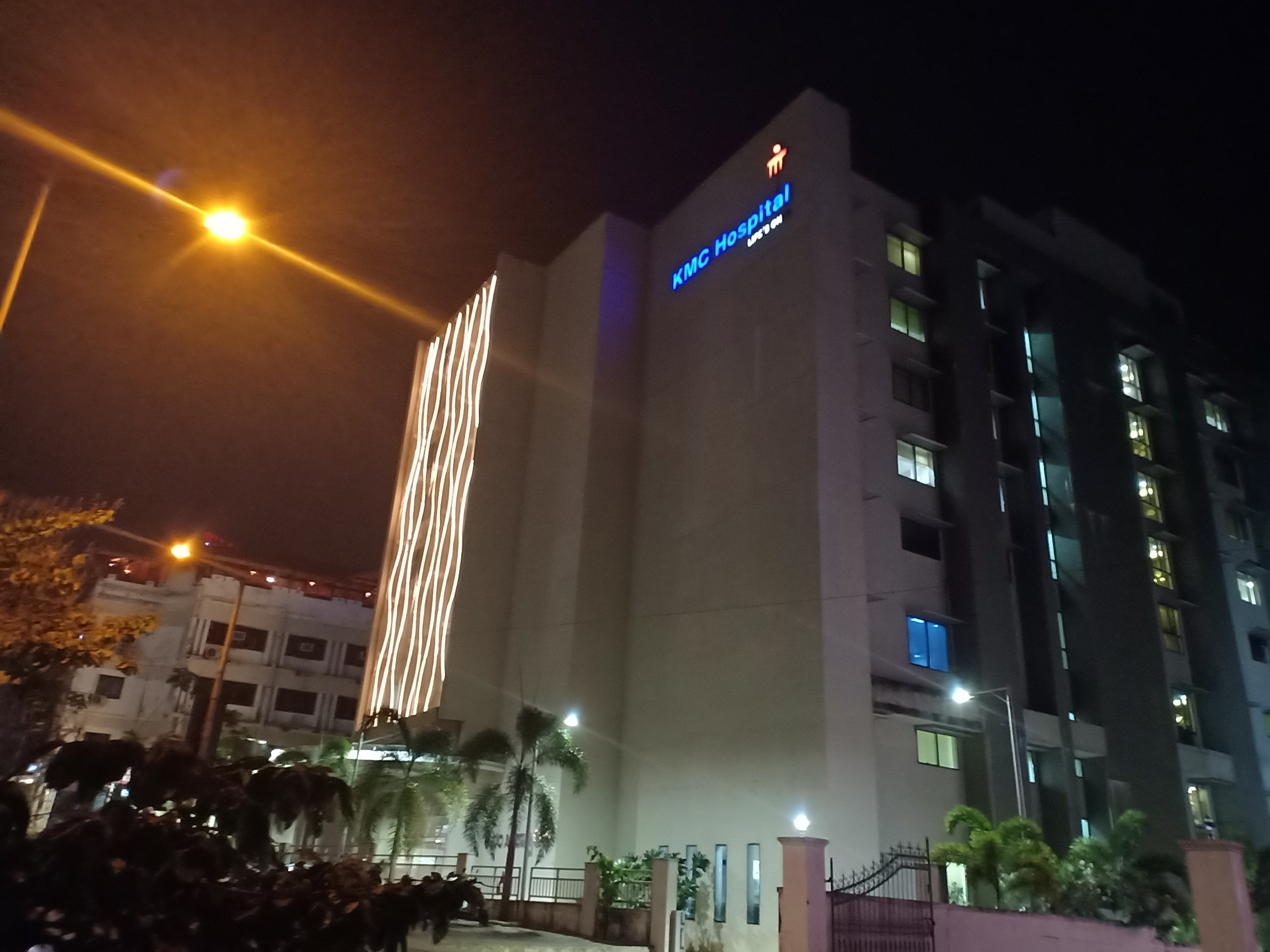
KMC Hospital in Mangaluru

The city is served by various hospitals such as the KMC Hospitals, Father Muller Charitable Institutions (FMCI), AJ Hospital, and Wenlock Hospital. Wenlock Hospital, a teaching hospital of KMC Mangaluru has around 1000 beds and caters to the healthcare needs of the neighboring districts. Mangalore is a hub for medical tourism and receives patients from foreign countries. From 2017 to 2019, around 240 foreign nationals were treated in three hospitals across the city. Approximately 50 per cent of the patients (the foreign nationals) arrived in 2018 and 2019. KMC, AJ, and Yenepoya Hospitals have received the highest number of foreign patients, including those from the United States. At Yenepoya Hospital, 68 foreign nationals have availed treatment during 2017–19. The largest inflow of foreign patients into Mangalore is from the Gulf countries. Deralakatte is a main healthcare hub of Mangaluru.

=== Utility services ===
In Mangalore, electricity is regulated by the Karnataka Power Transmission Corporation Limited (KPTCL) and distributed through Mangalore Electricity Supply Company (MESCOM). Major state-owned enterprises such as Mangalore Refinery and Petrochemicals Limited (MRPL) and Mangalore Chemicals & Fertilizers (MCF) operate their own captive power plants.

Potable water is supplied to the city from a vented dam that was constructed across the Netravati River at Thumbe, 14 km (9 mi) from Mangaluru. The Karnataka Urban Development and Coastal Environment Management Project (KUDCEMP) was established to improve essential urban infrastructure and municipal services in 10 cities along Karnataka's west coast, including Mangaluru. The distribution and rehabilitation of the drinking water in the city are handled by the French company Suez Environnement. Mangaluru's official refuse disposal site is in Vamanjoor. The city generates an average of 175 tonnes per day of waste, which is handled by the MCC's health department.

Mangaluru is the headquarters of the Dakshina Kannada Telecom District, the second largest telecom district in Karnataka. Fixed-line telecom services are provided alongside GSM and Code division multiple access (CDMA) mobile services. Prominent broadband internet service providers in the city include Airtel and DataOne by Bharat Sanchar Nigam Limited.

== Education ==
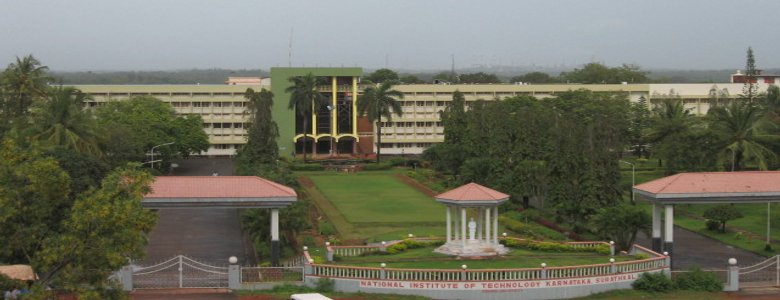
National Institute of Technology Karnataka (NITK) in Surathkal is among the premier institutes of India

The districts of Dakshina Kannada and Udupi are considered to be a major education corridor in India. Deralakatte is a university and medical town in Mangaluru where universities like Mangalore University, Nitte University including NMAM Institute of Technology, Yenepoya, Father Mullers, and Kanachur are situated. In schools and colleges which are below university-level, the media of instruction are mostly English and Kannada, and English is used for teaching in universities. Schools and colleges in Mangaluru are either government-run or are operated by private trusts and individuals. Schools are affiliated with either the Karnataka State Board, Indian Certificate of Secondary Education (ICSE), the Central Board of Secondary Education (CBSE), or the National Institute of Open Schooling (NIOS) boards.

Here are some of the earliest schools and colleges established in Mangaluru, and their years of establishment

- Basel Evangelical School (1838)
- Milagres School (1848)
- Rosario High School (1858)
- University College (1868)
- St. Ann's High School (1870)
- St. Aloysius College (1879)
- Canara High School (1891)
- St. Agnes PU College (1921)
- St. Agnes College (Autonomous) (1921)
- Sacred Hearts' School (1943)
- Cascia High School (1946)
- Carmel School (1951)

Kasturba Medical College which was established in 1953, was India's first private medical college and Manipal College Of Dental Sciences (MCODS) was established in the city in 1987. A public library run by the Corporation Bank is located at Mannagudda. Mangalore University was established on 10 September 1980 to fulfil the higher-education needs of Dakshina Kannada, Udupi and Kodagu districts. It is a National Assessment and Accreditation Council (NAAC)-accredited, four-star-level institution. NITK houses South India's first Regional Academy Centre for Space (RAC-S) which was launched by ISRO.

== Transport ==
Mangaluru is the only city in Karnataka to have all modes of transport—air, road, rail and sea.

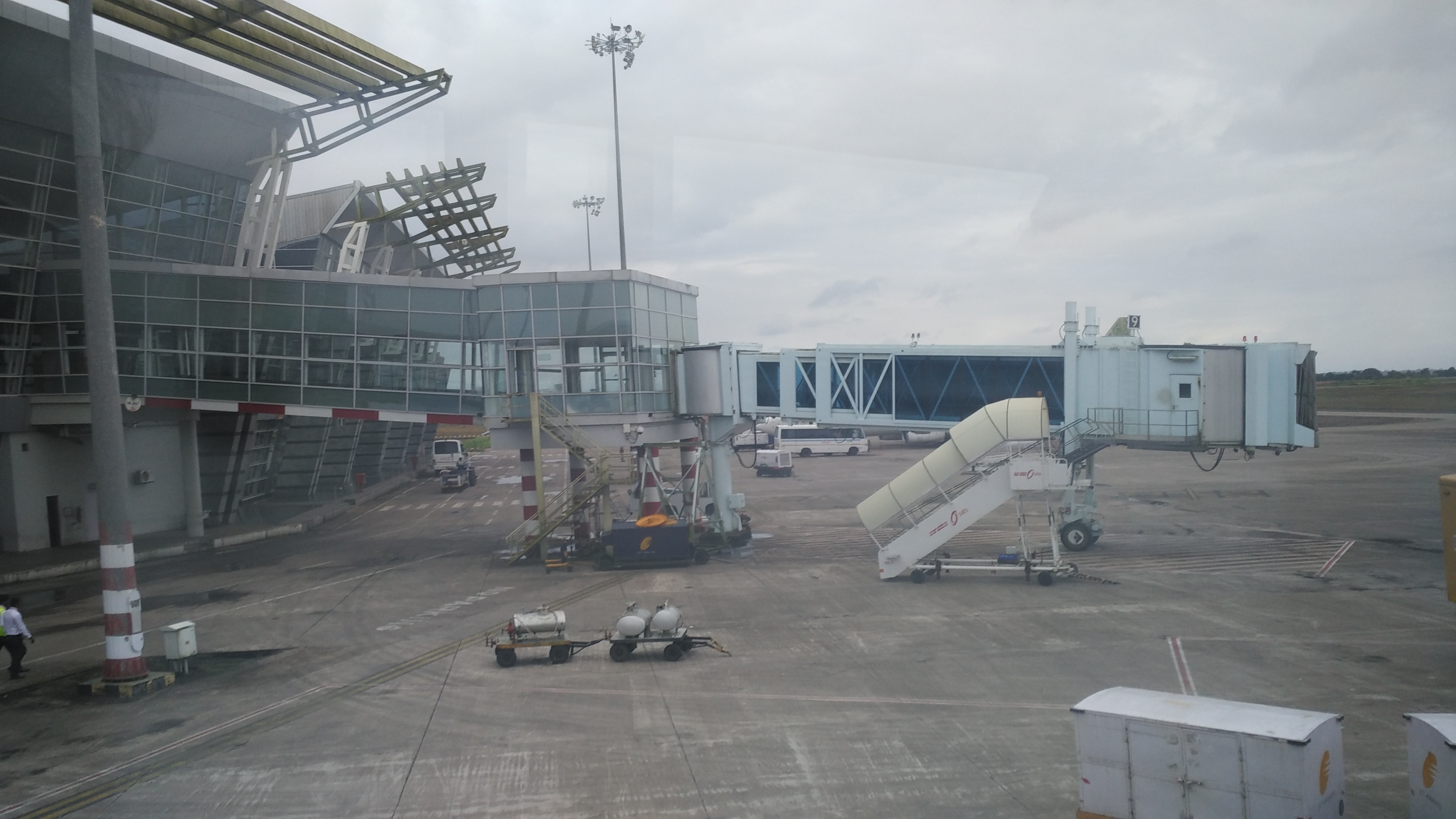
Jet bridge at the Mangalore International Airport

Mangalore International Airport (IATA: IXE, ICAO: VOML) is located near Bajpe-Kenjar and about 13 km (8 mi) north-east of Mangalore city centre. It operates regular scheduled flights to major cities in India and the Middle East. It is the second-largest and second-busiest airport in Karnataka. New terminals and runways at the airport accommodate both cargo and passenger requirements. This airport is accredited by the Airports Council International (ACI) under the Airport Health Accreditation (AHA) programme. State-government-run buses connect the city with the airport.

Five National Highways pass through Mangaluru. NH-66 (previously known as NH-17), which runs from Panvel, Maharashtra, to Kanyakumari, Tamil Nadu, passes through Mangaluru in a north–south direction. NH-75 (previously known as NH-48) runs eastward to Bengaluru and Vellore. NH-169 (previously known as NH-13) runs north-east from Mangaluru to Shimoga. NH-73, a 315 km (196 mi)-long National Highway connects Mangalore to Tumkur. NH-275 also connects Mangaluru with Bengaluru via Mysuru. National Highways Authority of India (NHAI) is upgrading the national highways connecting New Mangalore Port to Surathkal on NH-66 and BC Road junction on NH-75. Under the port connectivity programme of the National Highways Development Project (NHDP), a 37.5 km (23 mi) stretch of these highways will be widened from two lanes to four.

Mangaluru's city bus service is dominated by private operators, which operate routes that extend beyond the city's boundary. Bus services from Mangaluru are operated by the Dakshina Kannada Bus Operators' Association (DKBOA) and Canara Bus Operators Association (CBOA). Karnataka State Road Transport Corporation (KSRTC) also runs bus services in the city. Two distinct sets of routes for the buses exist; city routes are covered by city buses while intercity routes are covered by service and express buses. KSRTC also operates long-distance bus services that connect Mangaluru with other parts of the state. KSRTC JnNurm green city buses operate within the city limits.

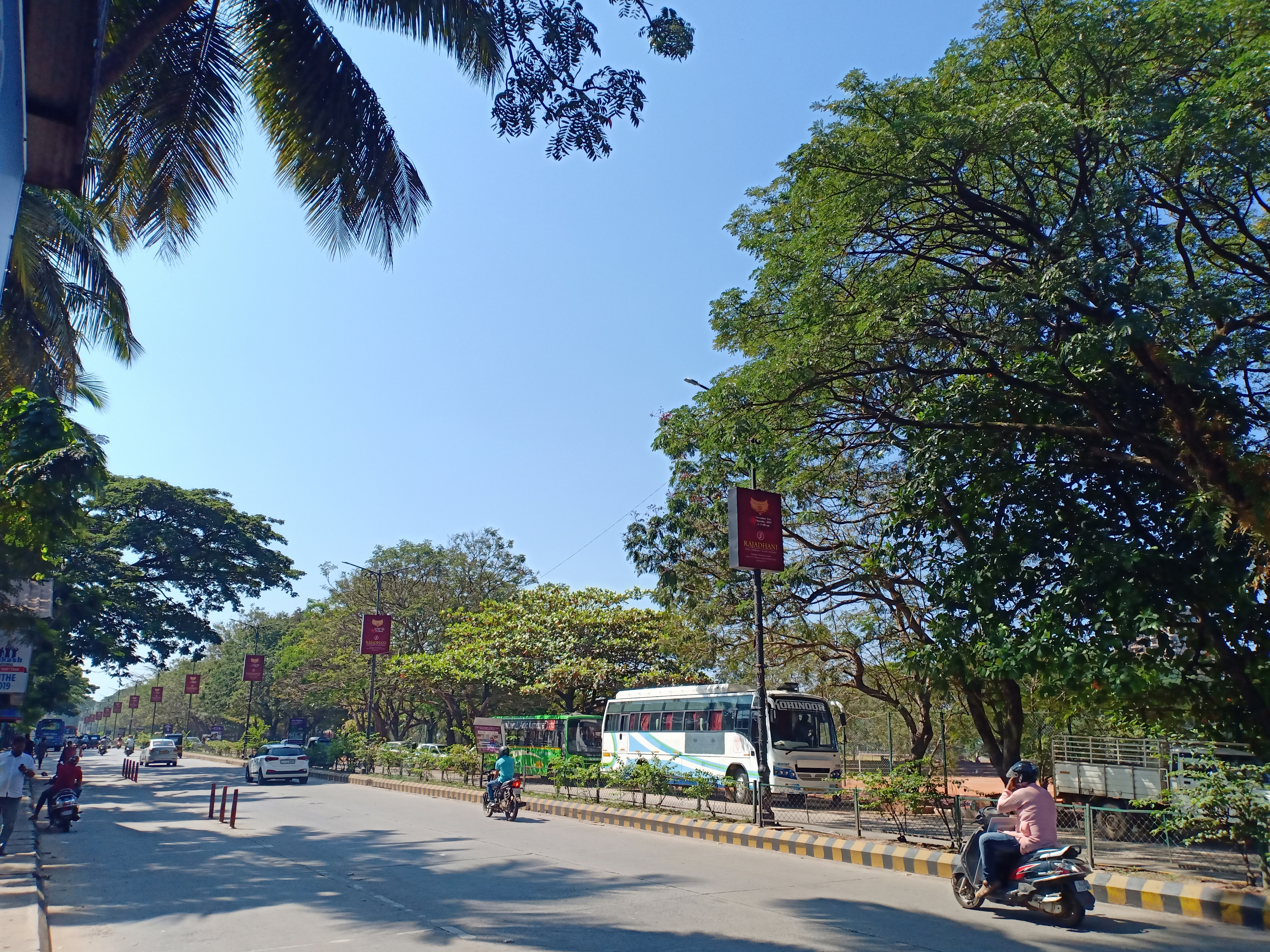
Clock Tower to Nehru Maidan Road

Indian rail connectivity in Mangaluru was established in 1907; the city was the starting point of India's longest rail route. The city has three railway stations; Mangalore Central at Hampankatta, Mangalore Junction at Padil, and Surathkal railway station. A railway track built through the Western Ghats connects Mangalore with Sakleshpur and Hassan. The broad gauge track connecting Mangalore to Bangalore via Hassan was opened to freight traffic in May 2006 and passenger traffic in December 2007. Mangalore is also connected to Chennai, Mumbai, Pune, Bhatkal, Karwar, Surat, Ajmer, and Margao through the Konkan Railway.

Mangaluru Harbour has shipping, storage, and logistical services; New Mangalore Port handles dry, bulk and fluid cargoes, and is equipped to handle petroleum oil lubricants, crude products and LPG containers. The Indian Coast Guard has a station at New Mangalore Port. The artificial harbour is India's seventh largest container port and the only major port in Karnataka. Electronic visa (e-visa) facilities are available for travellers arriving in India at New Mangalore Port.

== Culture ==
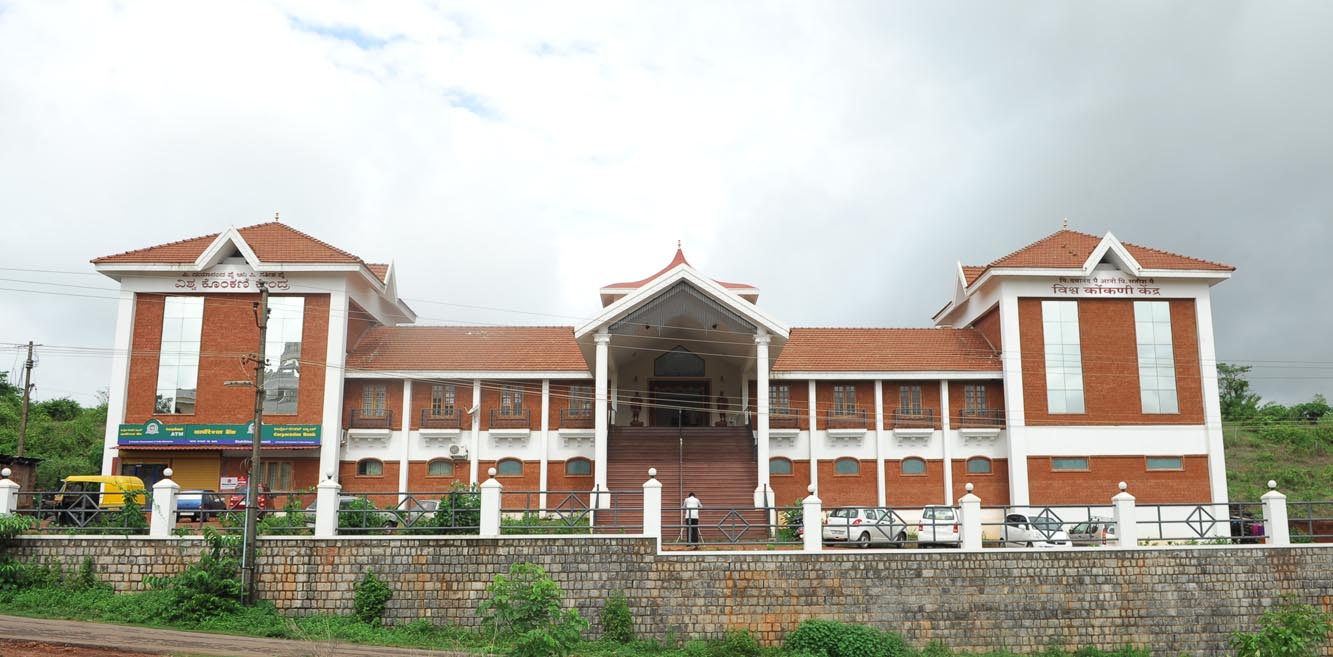
World Konkani Centre in Mangalore

=== Music and dance ===
Many classical dance forms and folk art are practised in Mangaluru. Yakshagana is a night-long dance and drama performance while Pilivesha (tiger dance), a folk dance unique to the city, is performed during Dasara and Krishna Janmashtami. Karadi Vesha (bear dance) is another well-known dance that is performed during Dasara.

Paddanas, ballad-like epics passed on verbally through generations, are sung by a community of impersonators in Tulu and are usually accompanied by the rhythmic drum beats. The Bearys' unique traditions are reflected in folk songs such as Kolkai (sung during Kolata, a valour folk-dance during which sticks are used as props), Unjal Pat (traditional lullaby), Moilanji Pat and Oppune Pat (sung at weddings). The Evkaristik Purshanv (Konkani: Eucharistic procession) is an annual Catholic religious procession that is held on the first Sunday of each year.

=== Festivals ===
Most of the popular Indian festivals are celebrated, the most important are Dasara, Diwali, Christmas, Easter, Eid and Ganesh Chaturthi. Kodial Theru, also known as Mangaluru Rathotsava (chariot festival) is unique to the Goud Saraswat Brahmin community and is celebrated at the city's Sri Venkatramana Temple.

The Mangalorean Catholic community's unique festivals include Monti Fest (Mother Mary's feast), which celebrates the Nativity feast and the blessing of new harvests. The Jain Milan, a committee that consists of Jain families, organises the annual Jain food festival, while Mosaru Kudike (curd pots feast), which is part of Krishna Janmashtami festival is celebrated by the whole community. Special night prayers called Taraveeh (rest and relaxation) are offered in mosques during the month of Ramadan.

Aati, a festival worshiping Kalenja, a patron spirit of the city, is during the Aashaadha month of Hindu calendar. Festivals such as Karavali Utsav (coastal festival) and Kudlotsava (Tulu: festival of Mangalore) are celebrated with national and state-level performances in dance, drama and music. Bhuta Kola (spirit worship) is usually performed by the Tuluva community at night. Bhuta Kola is similar to Theyyam in Kerala. Nagaradhane (snake worship) is performed in praise of Naga Devatha (the serpent king), who is said to be the protector of all snakes. Kori Katta, an ancient ritual associated with the Hindu temples in rural areas, a religious and spiritual cockfight, is held at the temples when permission is given by police.

=== Cuisine ===
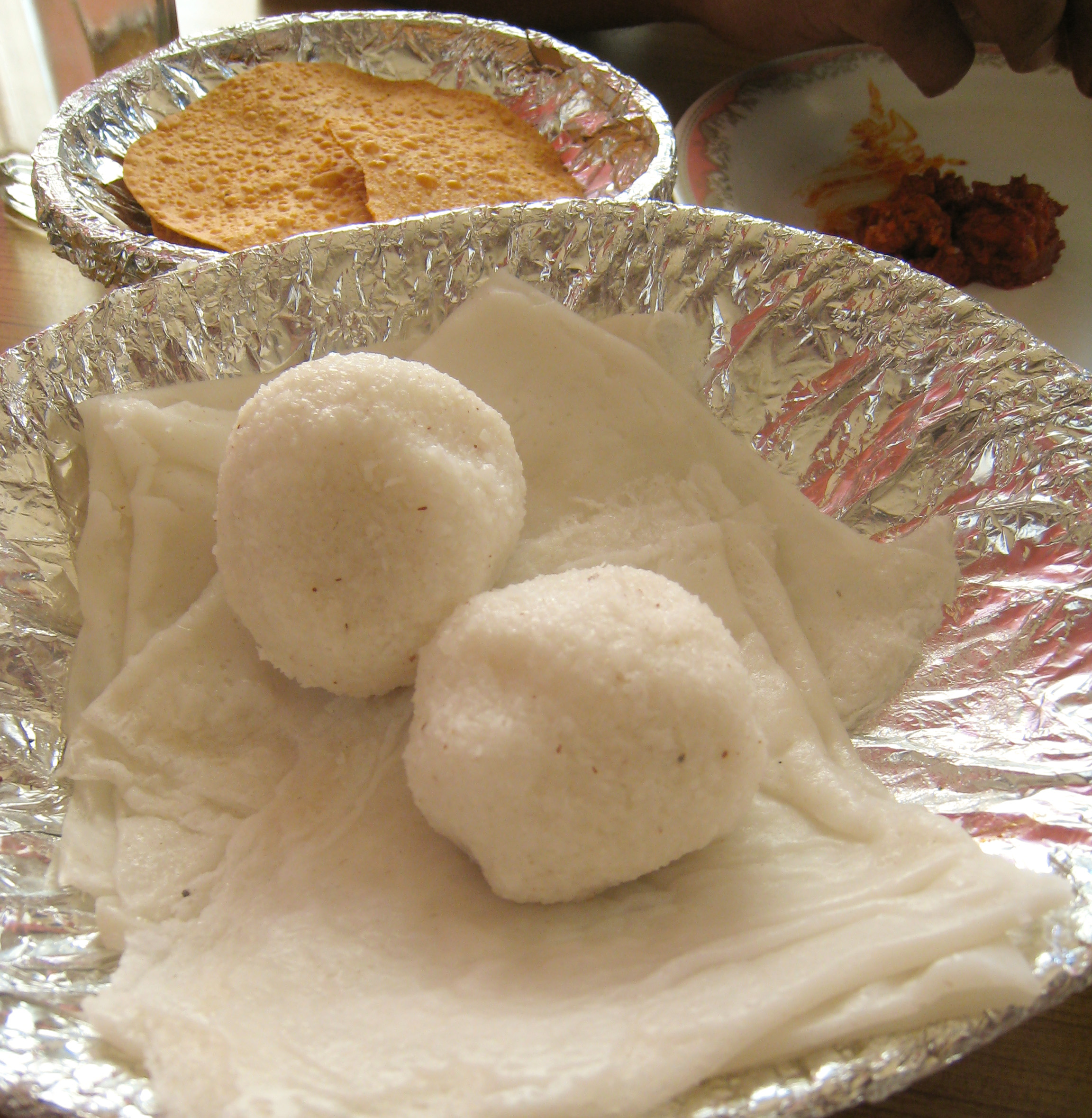
Neer dosa, a variant of dosa and pundi (rice ball), are native to Mangalore

Mangalorean cuisine is largely influenced by South Indian cuisine; several local cuisines are unique to the diverse communities of the region. Coconut, curry leaves, ginger, garlic, and chili are common ingredients in Mangalurean curries. Well-known Mangalorean dishes include kori rotti, neer dosa, pundi (rice ball), patrode, golibaje and Mangalore buns. Mangalorean cuisine is also known for fish and chicken dishes like bangude pulimunchi (spicy sour silver-grey mackerels), boothai gasi (sardine semi-gravy), anjal fry, Mangalorean Chicken Sukka, and Chicken Ghee Roast. Due to Mangalore being a coastal city, fish is a staple of most people's diet. The Konkani Hindu community's specialties include daali thoy (lentil curry), bibbe-upkari (tender cashew-nut curry), val val (coconut-milk-based curry), ambat (vegetable-based coconut curry), avnas ambe sasam (pineapple-mango fruit salad), kadgi chakko (raw jackfruit-coconut curry), paagila podi (spine gourd fries), and chane gashi (chickpea curry). Mangalorean Catholics' dishes like sanna, Pork Bafat, sorpotel, and mutton biryani of the Beary Muslims are well-known dishes. Pickles such as happala, sandige, and puli munchi are unique to Mangalore. Shendi (toddy) which is a country liquor prepared from coconut flower sap, is popular. Vegetarian cuisine, also known as Udupi cuisine, is known throughout the state and region.

== Media ==
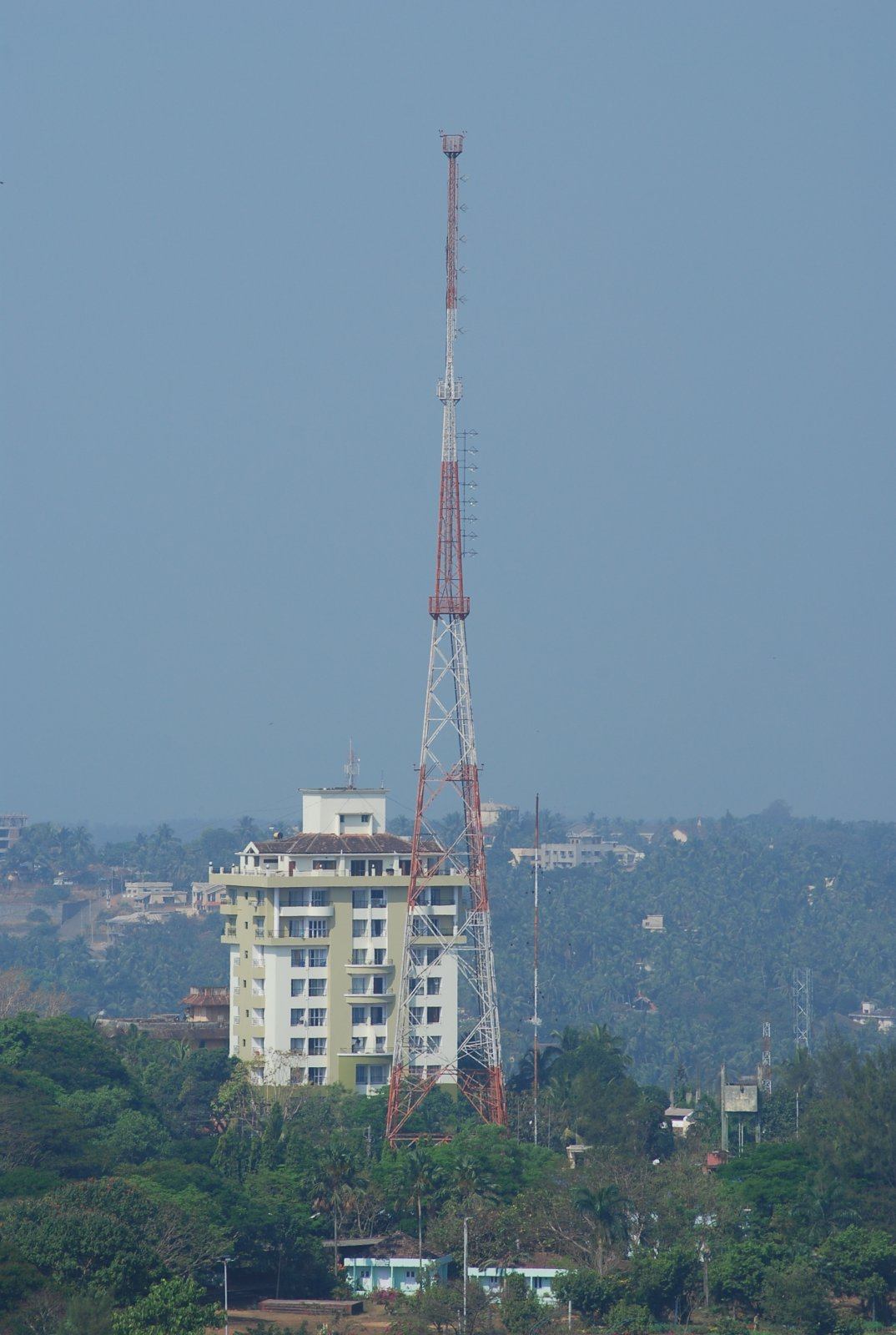
All India Radio's FM tower at Kadri

Mangaluru Samachara, the first ever newspaper in Kannada, was published in 1843 by Hermann Mögling of the Basel Mission. The first Kannada-to-English dictionary was published in Mangalore by Ferdinand Kittel in 1894. Major national English-language newspapers such as Times of India, The Hindu, The New Indian Express, Deccan Herald and Daijiworld publish localised Mangaluru editions. Madipu (Esteem), Mogaveera, Samparka (Contact) and Saphala (Success) are the well-known Tulu periodicals in Mangaluru.

Popular Konkani language periodicals published in the city are Raknno (Guardian), Konknni Dirvem (Konkani Treasure) and Kannik (Offering). Beary periodicals published in Mangaluru include Jyothi (Light) and Swatantra Bharata (Independent India). Kannada-language newspapers are Udayavani (Morning Voice) by Manipal Press Ltd, Vijaya Karnataka (Victory of Karnataka) and Vijayavani (Voice of Victory) by VRL Group, Prajavani (Voice of the People), Kannada Prabha (Kannada Radiance), Varthabharathi (Indian News), Samyukta Karnataka (United Karnataka), and Hosa Digantha (New Horizon). The city's evening newspapers include Karavali Ale (Waves from the Coast), Mangaluru Mitra (Friend of Mangalore), Sanjevani (Evening Voice), and Jayakirana (Rays of Victory) are also published in the city. The Konkani-language newspaper Kodial Khabar (Mangaluru News) is published fortnightly. Malayalam newspapers such as Malayala Manorama (Beautiful Malayalam) and Madhyamam (Medium) publish localised Mangalore editions. Mangalore Today is an English-language monthly magazine that was launched in 2009.

The state-run, nationally broadcast television channel Doordarshan provides national and local television coverage. Cable television also provides channels from independently owned private networks. Canara TV and V4 Digital infotech network, local Multi System Operators, transmits daily video news channels, live events and cultural programmes to the city through local channels. Multiple local television channels broadcast programmes and news in Tulu, Konkani, Beary and Kannada; these include Namma TV, V4 News and Spandana. Tulu channels are Namma Kudla and Posa Kural. All India Radio (AIR) has a studio at Kadri and broadcasts to Mangalore on 100.3 MHz. Mangalore's private FM stations include Radio Mirchi 98.3 FM, Big 92.7 FM and Red 93.5 FM. Radio SARANG 107.8 is a community radio station that is run by St. Aloysius College.

Mangaluru is home to the Tulu film industry which releases one film per month on average. Popular Tulu films include Kadala Mage (Son of the Sea) and Suddha (The Cleansing Rites). Tulu dramas which are mostly played in the Town Hall at Hampankatta, are very popular. Mangaluru hosted the Tulu film festivals in 2006 and 2015.

== Sports and pastimes ==
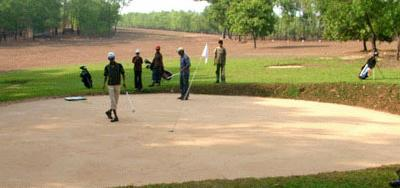
Mangalore Golf Course at Pilikula

Cricket is a popular sport in Mangaluru. Local cricket stadia include Mangala Stadium and B.R. Ambedkar Cricket Stadium (near NMPT). The Sports Authority of India (SAI) has a sports training centre at Mangala Stadium. Mangalore United is a Karnataka Premier League (KPL) franchise owned by Fiza Developers. Mangalore Premier League (MPL) is a cricket tournament organised by Karnataka Regional Cricket Academy. Nehru Maidan is an important local venue that hosts domestic, inter-school and intercollegiate tournaments. Mangalore Sports Club (MSC) has been elected as the institutional member for the Mangaluru Zone of the Karnataka State Cricket Association (KSCA). Lokesh Rahul, commonly known as KL Rahul and Budhi Kunderan, a former Indian wicket-keeper are from Mangalore. Ravi Shastri, who represented India for several years in international cricket as an all-rounder and captained the team, is of Mangalorean descent.

Football is also a popular sport in the city and is usually played in the maidans (grounds); the Nehru Maidan is the most popular venue for domestic tournaments. Dakshina Kannada District Football Association (DKDFA) annually organises the Independence Day Cup, which is played on Independence Day at district football grounds adjacent to Nehru Maidan. Schools and colleges from across Dakshina Kannada, Udupi and Kodagu districts participate and the matches are conducted under seven categories for children and young adults in education. Chess is a popular indoor pastime in the city. Mangaluru is the headquarters of South Kanara District Chess Association (SKDCA), which has hosted two All India Open Chess tournaments. Other sports such as tennis, squash, billiards, badminton, table tennis and golf are played in clubs and gymkhanas in Mangaluru. Pilikula Nisargadhama, an integrated theme park, has an 18-hole golf course at Vamanjoor. U S Mallya Indoor Stadium offers sporting facilities for badminton and basketball players.

== Tourism ==
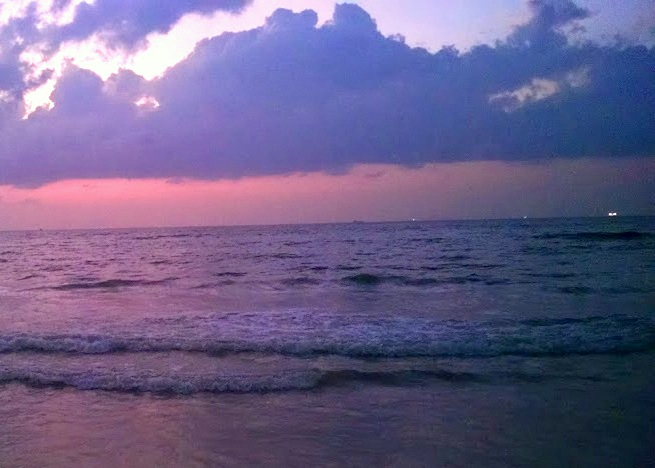
Panambur Beach

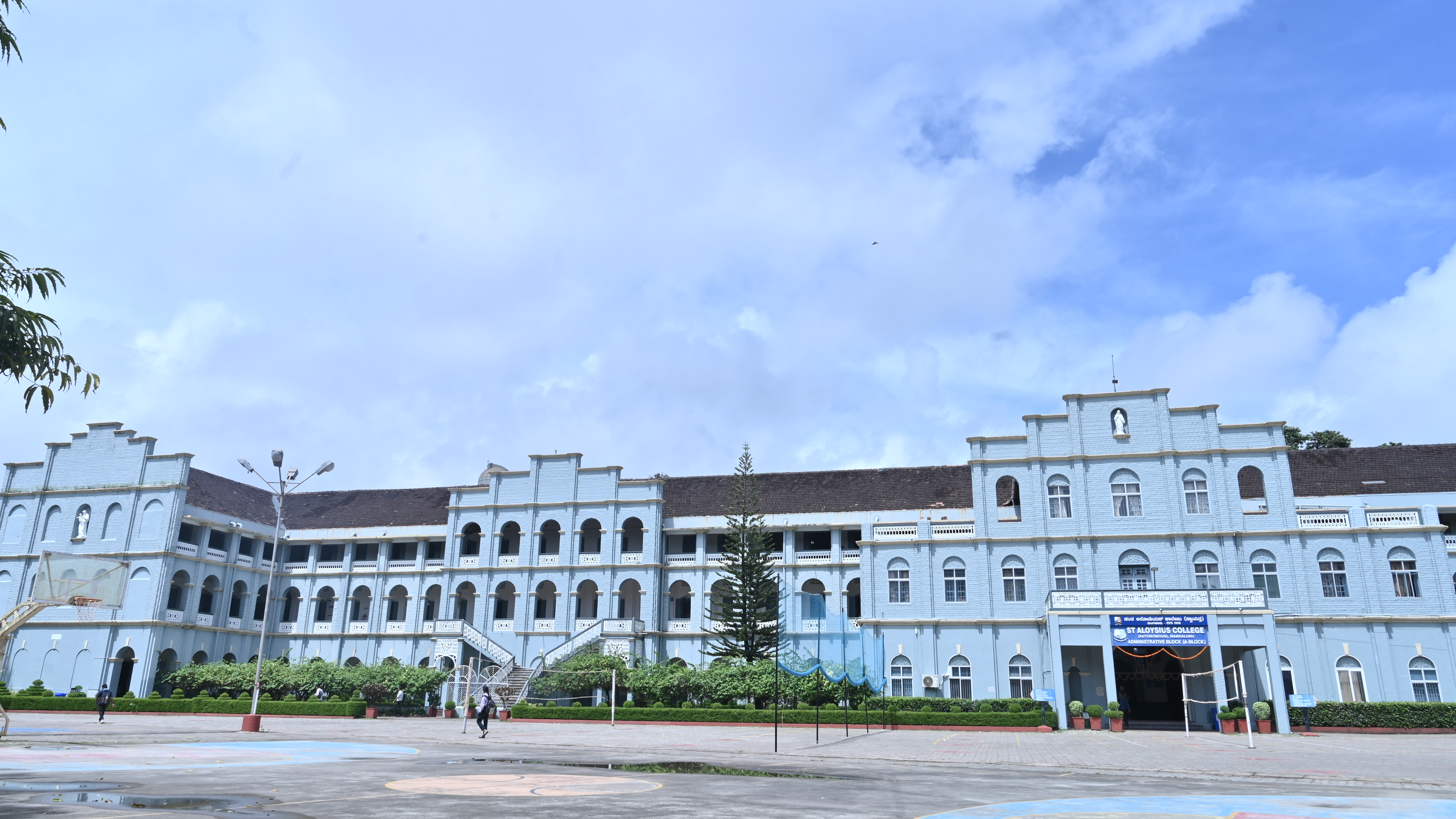
St Aloysius College

Mangaluru lies between the Arabian Sea and the Western Ghats. The city's temples and buildings include the Mangaladevi Temple, Kadri Manjunath Temple, St Aloysius Chapel, the Rosario Cathedral, Milagres Church, Dargah of Hazrat Shareef ul Madni at Ullal, and the Zeenath Baksh Jumma Masjid in Bunder.

The city is known for beaches such as Panambur, Tannirbhavi, NITK Beach, Sasihithlu beach, Someshwara beach, Ullal beach, Kotekar beach and Batapady beach. Panambur and Thannirbhavi beaches attract tourists from across the country. Panambur beach has facilities including food stalls, jet ski rides, boating and dolphin viewing; trained beach lifeguards and patrol vehicles ensure the safety of visitors.

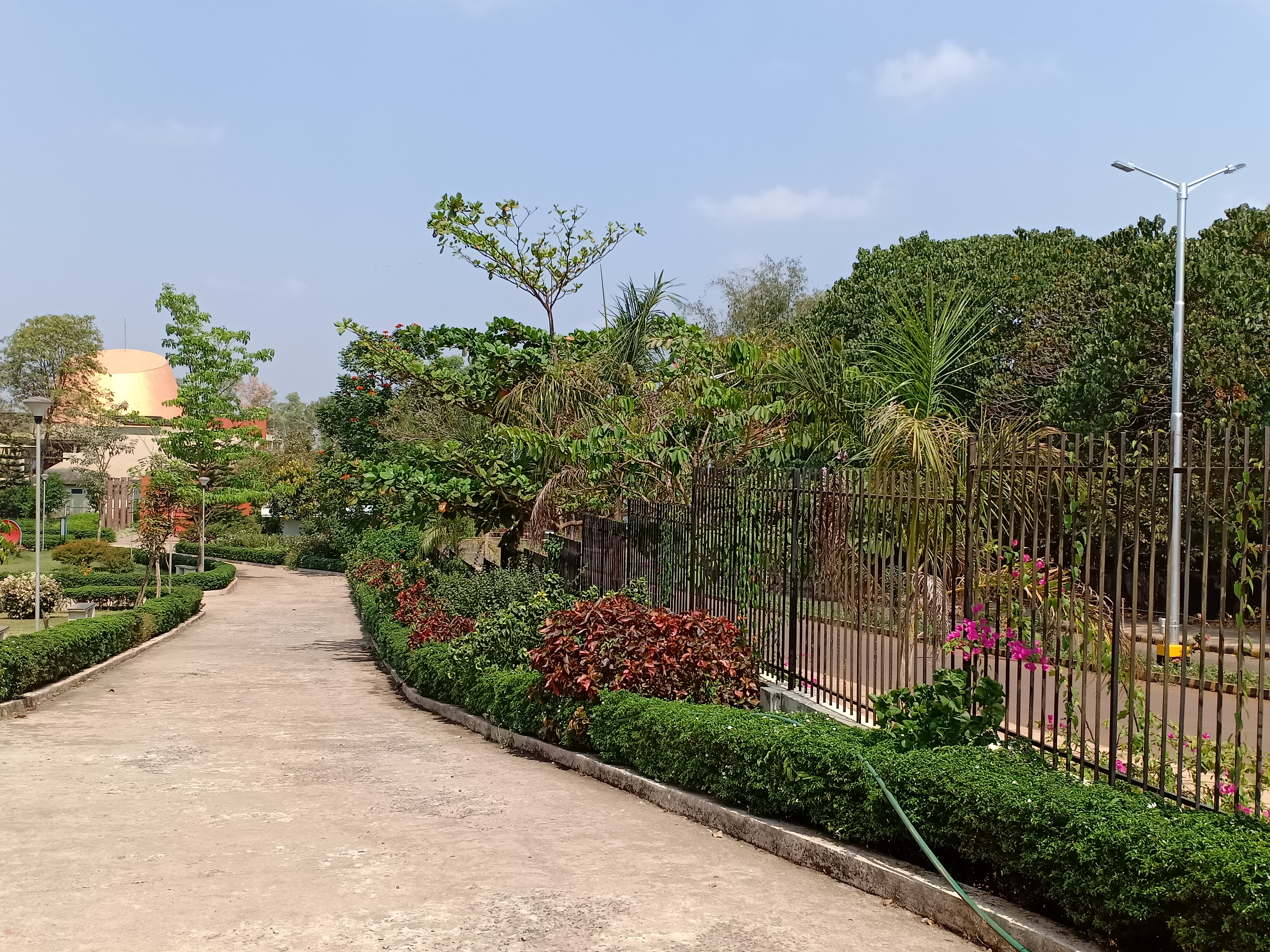
Dome of the Swami Vivekananda 3D Planetarium

Saavira Kambada Basadi is situated in Moodabidri, 34 km (21 mi) north-east of Mangaluru. The Sultan Battery watch tower built by Tipu Sultan is situated in Boloor on the banks of Gurupura River; visitors can take the ferry across the river to Tannirbhavi Beach. Adyar waterfalls is on the city's outskirts about 12 km (7.5 mi) from Mangaluru city centre. The city has developed and maintains public parks such as Pilikula Nisargadhama, Kadri Park, Tagore Park at Light House Hill, Mahatma Gandhi Park at Gandhinagar in Mannagudda, Tannirbavi Tree Park, Arise Awake Park at Karangalpady, and Corporation Bank Park at Nehru Maidan. Pilikula, which occupies 370 acres (150 ha), has a zoo, botanical garden, lake, water park (manasa), Swami Vivekananda Planetarium, science centre, and a 50-acre (20 ha) 18-hole golf course. Swami Vivekananda Planetarium is the first 3D planetarium in India with an 8K resolution display.

Mangaluru Dasara, a ten-day festival held at Sri Gokarnatheswara temple, attracts devotees from across India. Mangaladevi temple attracts devotees from all over the country during Navaratri.

== Sister cities ==
Mangalore is twinned with two Canadian cities:

- Hamilton, Canada, since 1968
- Delta, Canada, since 2010

== Sources ==
- Chopra, P. N. (2003). History of South India. S.Chand & Company. ISBN 81-219-0153-7.
- (Government of Karnataka), Directorate of Economics and Statistics (2004). "Economic Infrastructure" (PDF). Economic Survey of Karnataka 2003–04. National Informatics Centre (Karnataka State). pp. 216–235. Archived from the original (PDF) on 3 October 2008.
- (Government of Karnataka), Directorate of Economics and Statistics (2005). Area, Population, Membership, Revenue, Expenditure & Employment by Municipalities, Karnataka, 2000–2001 (PDF). National Informatics Centre (Karnataka State). Archived from the original (PDF) on 3 October 2008.
- Dodwell, H.H. (1922). The Cambridge History of India. Cambridge University Press Archive.
- Fisher, William Bayne; Jackson, Peter; Lockhart, Laurence (1986). The Cambridge history of Iran. Cambridge University Press. ISBN 978-0-521-20094-3.
- Forrest, George W. (1887). Selections from the Letters, Despatches, and Other State Papers Preserved in the Bombay Secretariat. Vol. 2. Government Central Press. ISBN 3337278663.
- Ghosh, Amitav (2002). The Imam and the Indian: Prose Pieces. Orient Longman. ISBN 81-7530-047-7.
- Heitzman, James (2008). City in South Asia (illustrated ed.). Routledge. ISBN 978-0-415-34355-8.
- "History". South Kanara District Gazetteer. Karnataka State Gazetteer. Vol. 12. Gazetteer Department (Government of Karnataka). 1973. pp. 33–85.
- International Committee of Historical Sciences (1935). Bulletin of the International Committee of Historical Sciences. Vol. 7. Les presses universitaires de France.
- Kerr, Robert (1812). "Discoveries, Navigations, and Conquests of the Portuguese in India, from 1505 to 1539". General History and Collection of Voyages and Travels. Vol. 6. George Ramsay and Company. ISBN 0364244844.
- Mangalore City Corporation. "Description of Environment". Mangalore SEZ Draft (October 2007). pp. 31–48. Archived from the original (DOC) on 10 April 2008.
- Mangalore City Corporation. "Description of Environment". Mangalore SEZ Draft (October 2007). pp. 111–134. Archived from the original (DOC) on 10 April 2008.
- Lal, K. S. (2002). Return to roots: emancipation of Indian Muslims. Radha Publications. ISBN 978-81-7487-245-6..
- Lee, Samuel (1829). "On the Malabar Coast". Quoted in "Selections from the Travels of Ibn Batuta". Oriental Translation Committee. ISBN 1605206210.
- Mangalore City Corporation. Integrated Solid Waste Management Operation & Maintenance report. Archived from the original (DOC) on 10 April 2008.
- National Council of Applied Economic Research (1961). Traffic Survey of Mangalore and Malpe Ports: Report. Public Works Department, Government of Mysore.
- Pinto, Pius Fidelis (1999). "History of Christians in coastal Karnataka, 1500–1763 A.D.". Samanvaya Prakashan. ASIN B0000CPGW4..
- Prabhu, Alan Machado (1999). Sarasvati's Children: A History of the Mangalorean Christians. I.J.A. Publications. ISBN 978-81-86778-25-8..
- "People". South Kanara District Gazetteer. Karnataka State Gazetteer. Vol. 12. Gazetteer Department (Government of Karnataka). 1973. pp. 86–125.
- Riddick, John F. (2006). The History of British India: A Chronology. Greenwood Publishing Group. ISBN 0-313-32280-5.
- Shrihari, S. (2007). Environmental Concerns for a Typical Fast Developing Indian City: Mangalore. Faculty of Civil Engineering, National Institute of Technology Karnataka, Surathkal.
- Somerset, Playne; Bond, E. W.; Wright, Arnold; Wright, Playne (2004). Southern India: Its History, People, Commerce, and Industrial Resources. Asian Educational Services. ISBN 81-206-1344-9.
- Thornton, Edward (1859). The History of the British Empire in India. Cox and Wyman Printers. ISBN 1331267595.
- Townsend, George Henry (1867). A Manual of Dates: A Dictionary of Reference to the Most Important Events in the History of Mankind to be Found in Authentic Records. Warne. ISBN 0266609635.
