= Mangaluru City Bus routes =

Public transport routes in Mangalore, India

Unlike most of the cities in Karnataka, Mangaluru city bus routes are dominated by private buses. Dilraj Alva, former president of Dakshina Kannada Bus Operators’ Association, a body of Mangaluru city bus owners, said that the city now had 325 buses. The Canara Bus Owners’ Association (comprising Dakshina Kannada and Udupi districts) operated service buses and inter-district buses. There are 1,500 such buses now, he said.

State Bank, Kankanadi, KSRTC bus stand, Surathkal are important bus stations in the city.

Please note- The present bus route no is along with the Destination not to be confused with Bus route no table

Mangalore City bus routes
Bus route no	Source	Destination	Old no	Frequency	Route
1	State Bank	Kunjathbail	1	Every hour	Carstreet, Urwa
1A	State Bank	Urwastore	7	Every 15 mins	Carstreet, Urwa
1B	State Bank	Kottara	13A	Every hour	Carstreet, Urwa
1	State Bank	KUNJATHBAIL	13S	Every hour	Carstreet, Urwa
2	State Bank	Kodikal	1B	Every 15 mins	Carstreet, Urwa
2A	State Bank	Kodikal	1B	Every hour	Carstreet, Urwa
3	State Bank	Mannagudda Shediguri	31	Every 20 mins	Carstreet, Urwa
3A	State Bank	Lalbag Shediguri	31A	Every 20 mins	Carstreet, Urwa
3B	State Bank	Dambel	31B	Every hour	Carstreet, Urwa
4	State Bank	Sulthan Bathery	16	Every 30 mins	Carstreet, Urwa
4A	State Bank	Sulthan Bathery	16A	Every 30 mins	Carstreet, Urwa
6	State Bank	Tannirbavi beach	1A	Every hour	Lalbag, Urwastore, Kuloor
6M	State Bank	Panambur Beach	1M	Every hour	Lalbag, Urwastore, Kuloor
7	State Bank	Kunjathbail	13B	Every 15 mins	Lalbag, Urwastore, Kuloor
8A	State Bank	Kavoor Bondel	13C	Every 15 mins	Lalbag, Urwastore, Kuloor
8B	State Bank	Kavoor Pachanadi	13D	Every 2 hour	Lalbag, Urwastore, Kuloor
9	State Bank	Akasha Bhavana	33	Every 20 mins	Lalbag, Kuntikan, Konchady
9A	State Bank	Anandanagar	33	Every 20 mins	Lalbag, Kuntikan, Konchady
9B	State Bank	Landlinks	33C	Every hour	Lalbag, Kuntikan, Konchady
11	State Bank	Kunjathbail	17	Every 30 mins	Lalbag, Kuntikan, Konchady
11M	State Bank	Kunjathbail	13S	Every hour	Lalbag, Kuntikan, Konchady
12	State Bank	Bondel	19	Every 10 mins	Jyoti/Falnir, K P T, Yeyyadi
12A	State Bank	Pachanadi	19	Every hour	Jyoti/Falnir, K P T, Yeyyadi
12B	Kankanadi	Lalbag Bondel	19A	Every hour	Jyoti/Falnir, K P T, Yeyyadi
12M	State Bank	Vamanjur	19M	Every hour	Jyoti/Falnir, K P T, Yeyyadi
13	State Bank	Bondel	14	Every 15 mins	Jyoti/Falnir, K P T, Yeyyadi
13A	State Bank	Bondel Kavoor	14A	Every hour	Jyoti/Falnir, K P T, Yeyyadi
14	State Bank	Kannagudde	4	Every 30 mins	Kankanadi, Nanthoor, Kulashekar
14A	State Bank	Saripalla Kannagudde	4B	Every hour	Kankanadi, Nanthoor, Kulashekar
14B	State Bank	Neermarga	4C	Every 2 hour	Kankanadi, Nanthoor, Kulashekar
14C	State Bank	Merlapadav	4A	Every 2 hour	Kankanadi, Nanthoor, Kulashekar
16	State Bank	Shaktinagar	6A	Every 15 mins	Mallikatta, Nanthoor
16A	State Bank	Shaktinagar	6B	Every 15 mins	Mallikatta, Nanthoor
16B	State Bank	Shaktinagar	6C	Every 30 mins	Mallikatta, Nanthoor
16M	State Bank	SHAKTINAGAR	6M	Every hour	Mallikatta, Nanthoor
17A	State Bank	Moodshedde	3A	Every 15 mins	Mallikatta, Kudupu, Vamanjoor
17B	State Bank	Moodshedde	3B	Every 15 mins	Mallikatta, Kudupu, Vamanjoor
17M	State Bank	MOODSHEDDE	3S	Every hour	Mallikatta, Kudupu, Vamanjoor
18	State Bank	Ullaibettu	3D	Every hour	Mallikatta, Kudupu, Vamanjoor
19	State Bank	Neermarga	21	Every 30 mins	Mallikatta, Nanthoor, Kulashekar
19A	State Bank	Neermarga Merlapadav	21A	Every 2 hour	Mallikatta, Nanthoor, Kulashekar
19B	State Bank	Neermarga Konimar	21B	Every 2 hour	Mallikatta, Nanthoor, Kulashekar
21	State Bank	Padil	30	Every hour	Mallikatta, Nanthoor
21A	State Bank	Adyar L. Jetty	30A	Every 2 hour	Mallikatta, Nanthoor
21B	State Bank	Adyar Padav	30B	Every 2 hour	Mallikatta, Nanthoor
22	State Bank	Maroli Padil	37	Every hour	Mallikatta, Nanthoor
23A	State Bank	Faisalnagar	23	Every 20 mins	Kankanadi, Mangalore Jn
23B	State Bank	Faisalnagar	23C	Every 20 mins	Kankanadi, Mangalore Jn
24	State Bank	Adyar Padav	10	Every 20 mins	Kankanadi, Mangalore Jn
24A	State Bank	Adyar L. Jetty	10A	Every 20 mins	Kankanadi, Mangalore Jn
24B	State Bank	Merlapadav	10B	Every hour	Kankanadi, Mangalore Jn
24M	KSRTC	ADYAR PADAV	10K	Every hour	Kankanadi, Mangalore Jn
26	State Bank	Padil Bajal	9	Every 20 mins	Kankanadi, Mangalore Jn
26A	State Bank	Bajal J M Road	9B	Every 20 mins	Kankanadi, Mangalore Jn
26M	KSRTC	BAJAL	9M	Every hour	Kankanadi, Mangalore Jn
27	State Bank	Jalligudde	11B	Every 20 mins	Kankanadi, Mangalore Jn
27A	State Bank	Adyar L. Jetty	11A	Every 20 mins	Kankanadi, Mangalore Jn
28	State Bank	Morgan's gate	5	Every 5 mins	Kankanadi
29	State Bank	Mangaladevi	27	Every 10 mins	Bolara
29A	State Bank	Mulihitlu	27A	Every 10 mins	Bolara
31	State Bank	Morgan's gate	18	Every hour	Bolara
31A	State Bank	Bajal J M Road	9A	Every 30 mins	Bolara
32	State Bank	Morgan's gate	29	Every hour	Bolara
32A	State Bank	Bajal J M Road	9A	Every 30 mins	Bolara
34	State Bank	Jokkatte	2C	Every 30 mins	Kuloor, Baikampady
34A	State Bank	Porkody	2C	Every hour	Kuloor, Baikampady
34B	State Bank	Porkody Bajpe	2C	Irregular	Kuloor, Baikampady
34E	Kankanadi	Bajpe	2E	Irregular	Kuloor, Baikampady
34F	Bengre	Bajpe	2B	Every hour	Kuloor, Baikampady
34G	Surathkal	Bajpe	2G	Irregular	Kuloor, Baikampady
36	State Bank	NITK Mukka	2	Every 2 hour	Kuloor, Panamboor, Surathkal
36A	State Bank	Sashihitlu	2A	Every hour	Kuloor, Panamboor, Surathkal
36B	State Bank	Kodikere	45K	Irregular	Kuloor, Panamboor, Surathkal
36M	State Bank	NITK MUKKA	2M	Every hour	Kuloor, Panamboor, Surathkal
37	State Bank	Surathkal Kaikamba	45	Every 30 mins	Kuloor, Panamboor, Surathkal
37A	State Bank	Katipalla Kaikamba	45C	Every 10 mins	Kuloor, Panamboor, Surathkal
37B	State Bank	Janatha Colony Kaikamba	45B	Every 30 mins	Kuloor, Panamboor, Surathkal
37C	State Bank	Katipalla Kaikamba Kuthethur	45D	Every hour	Kuloor, Panamboor, Surathkal
37D	State Bank	Katipalla Kaikamba Madya	45H	Irregular	Kuloor, Panamboor, Surathkal
37E	State Bank	Katipalla Kaikamba Krishnapur	45E	Irregular	Kuloor, Panamboor, Surathkal
37M	State Bank	KATIPALLA	45S	Every hour	Kuloor, Panamboor, Surathkal
38	State Bank	Katipalla Soorinje	53	Every hour	Kuloor, Panamboor, Surathkal
38A	State Bank	Soorinje Shibaroor	53A	Every hour	Kuloor, Panamboor, Surathkal
38E	Kankanadi	Katipalla Soorinje	53B	Irregular	Kuloor, Panamboor, Surathkal
38F	Kunjathbail	Katipalla Soorinje	53E	Irregular	Kuloor, Panamboor, Surathkal
39	State Bank	Kulai Chitrapura	59	Every hour	Kuloor, Panamboor, Surathkal
41	State Bank	Chelair Padav	41	Irregular	Kuloor, Panamboor, Surathkal
41A	State Bank	Chelair Colony	41A	Irregular	Kuloor, Panamboor, Surathkal
41E	Kunjathbail	Chelair Colony	13J	Irregular	Kuloor, Panamboor, Surathkal
41F	Moodshedde	Chelair Colony	3J	Irregular	Kuloor, Panamboor, Surathkal
41M	State Bank	CHELAIR COLONY	41M	Every hour	Kuloor, Panamboor, Surathkal
42	State Bank	Bajpe	47	Every 30 mins	Konchady, Kavoor, Airport
42A	State Bank	Bajpe Airport	47A	Irregular	Konchady, Kavoor, Airport
42B	State Bank	Bajpe Kattalsar	47C	Irregular	Konchady, Kavoor, Airport
42C	State Bank	Bajpe Adyapady	47B	Irregular	Konchady, Kavoor, Airport
42E	Kankanadi	Bajpe	47D	Irregular	Konchady, Kavoor, Airport
42M	State Bank	Bajpe	47K	Every hour	Konchady, Kavoor, Airport
43	State Bank	Bajpe	22	Irregular	Kudupu, Vamanjoor, Kaikamba
43A	State Bank	Bajpe Adyapadi	22A	9am 12pm 5pm	Kudupu, Vamanjoor, Kaikamba
44A	State Bank	Someshwar ullal	12A	Half an hour	Kudupu, Vamanjoor, Kaikamba
44B	State Bank	Polali Kolthamajal	12B	Irregular	Kudupu, Vamanjoor, Kaikamba
44E	Kankanadi	Polali Ammunje	12C	Irregular	Kudupu, Vamanjoor, Kaikamba
46A	State Bank	Ullal Someshwara	44A	Every 20 mins	Kankanadi, Moger, Thokkottu
46B	State Bank	Ullal Kotepura	44D	Every 20 mins	Kankanadi, Moger, Thokkottu
46C	State Bank	Ullal L. Jetty	44C	Every 40 mins	Kankanadi, Moger, Thokkottu
46D	Mangaladevi	Ullal Someshwara	44F	Every 2 hour	Kankanadi, Moger, Thokkottu
46E	Kunjathabail	Ullal Someshwara	44T	Every 2 hour	Kankanadi, Moger, Thokkottu
46M	KSRTC	SOMESHWARA	44S	Every hour	Kankanadi, Moger, Thokkottu
47	State Bank	Kumpala	44E	Every hour	Kankanadi, Moger, Thokkottu
47A	State Bank	Mangaladevi Kumpala	44	Every 2 hour	Kankanadi, Moger, Thokkottu
47E	Kottara	Kumpala	44J	Every 2 hour	Kankanadi, Moger, Thokkottu
47F	Surathkal	Kumpala	44I	Every 2 hour	Kankanadi, Moger, Thokkottu
48	State Bank	Talapady	42	Every 10 mins	Kankanadi, Moger, Thokkottu
49	State Bank	Talapady	43	Every 10 mins	Kankanadi, Moger, Thokkottu
43A	State Bank	Talapady Kinya	43A	Every hour	Kankanadi, Moger, Thokkottu
43B	State Bank	Talapady Kinya	43B	Every hour	Kankanadi, Moger, Thokkottu
49E	Moodshedde	Talapady Devipura	64A	Every 2 hour	Kankanadi, Moger, Thokkottu
49M	KSRTC	TALAPADY	42M	Every hour	Kankanadi, Moger, Thokkottu
51	State Bank	Konaje	51	Every 20 mins	Kankanadi, Moger, Thokkottu
51A	State Bank	Konaje Inoli	51A	Every hour	Kankanadi, Moger, Thokkottu
51B	State Bank	Harekala Pavoor	55	Every hour	Kankanadi, Moger, Thokkottu
51C	State Bank	Konaje Mudipu	51E	Every 2 hour	Kankanadi, Moger, Thokkottu
51E	Kottara Kankanadi	Kotekar Konaje	51B	Every hour	Kankanadi, Moger, Thokkottu
51F	Kottara Kankanadi	Konaje Inoli	51B	Every hour	Kankanadi, Moger, Thokkottu
51G	Baikampady	Konaje Inoli	51F	Every 2 hour	Kankanadi, Moger, Thokkottu
51H	Kana Kottara	Kuttar Konaje	51G	Every 2 hour	Kankanadi, Moger, Thokkottu
51M	KSRTC	KONAJE	51S	Every hour	Kankanadi, Moger, Thokkottu
52	State Bank	Ellyarpadav	44B	Every 30 mins	Kankanadi, Moger, Thokkottu
52A	State Bank	Ellyarpadav Konaje	44M	Every hour	Kankanadi, Moger, Thokkottu
52B	State Bank	Deralakatte Madaka	44G	Every 2 hour	Kankanadi, Moger, Thokkottu
52C	State Bank	Deralakatte Kinya	51K	Every 2 hour	Kankanadi, Moger, Thokkottu
52D	State Bank	Deralakatte Padalikatte	51L	Every 2 hour	Kankanadi, Moger, Thokkottu
53	State Bank	Thoudugoli	54	Every hour	Kankanadi, Moger, Thokkottu
53A	State Bank	Hoo Hakuvakallu	54A	Every 2 hour	Kankanadi, Moger, Thokkottu
53B	State Bank	Manjanady Narya	54B	Every 2 hour	Kankanadi, Moger, Thokkottu
2C	Mangaladevi	Kodical	1C	Every hour	Kankanadi, Lalbag
3C	Mangaladevi	Kudroli Dambel	31C	Every 2 hour	Kankanadi, Lalbag
3D	Mangaladevi	Dambel	15K	Every 2 hour	Kankanadi, Lalbag
3E	Mangaladevi	Urwastore Dambel	15J	Every 2 hour	Kankanadi, Lalbag
4C	Mangaladevi	Sulthan Bathery	16B	Every 2 hour	Kankanadi, Lalbag
7C	Mangaladevi	Kunjathbail	13G	Every 30 mins	Kankanadi, Lalbag
7D	Mangaladevi	Kunjathbail	13H	Every 30 mins	Kankanadi, Lalbag
8C	Mangaladevi	Kavoor Bondel	13H	Every 30 mins	Kankanadi, Lalbag
13C	Mangaladevi	Bondel	14C	Every 30 mins	Kankanadi, Nanthoor
13D	Mangaladevi	Bondel Kavoor	14D	Every 30 mins	Kankanadi, Nanthoor
14D	Mangaladevi	Saripalla Kannagudde	4F	Every hour	Kankanadi, Nanthoor
14E	Mangaladevi	Merlapadav	4E	Every 2 hour	Kankanadi, Nanthoor
16C	Mangaladevi	Shaktinagar	6D	Every 30 mins	Kankanadi, Nanthoor
17C	Mangaladevi	Moodshedde	3C	Every 20 mins	Kankanadi, Nanthoor
27C	Mangaladevi	Jalligudde	11C	Every hour	Kankanadi, Padil
27D	Kadri	Jalligudde	11D	Every hour	Kankanadi, Padil
33	Mangaladevi	Surathkal	15	Every 30 mins	KPT, KSRTC, Kuloor, NMPT
33	Mangaladevi	Surathkal Kaikamba	15	Every 30 mins	KPT, KSRTC, Kuloor, NMPT
33A	Mangaladevi	Katipalla Kaikamba	15A	Every 30 mins	KPT, KSRTC, Kuloor, NMPT
33A	Mangaladevi	Katipalla Madya	15A	Every 30 mins	KPT, KSRTC, Kuloor, NMPT
33B	Mangaladevi	Janatha Colony Kaikamba	15F	Every hour	KPT, KSRTC, Kuloor, NMPT
33C	Mangaladevi	Katipalla Kuthethur	15D	Every hour	KPT, KSRTC, Kuloor, NMPT
33D	Mangaladevi	Katipalla Chelair Padav	15B	Every hour	KPT, KSRTC, Kuloor, NMPT
33E	Mangaladevi	Katipalla Soorinje	15C	Every hour	KPT, KSRTC, Kuloor, NMPT
33F	Mangaladevi	Surathkal Chelair Colony	15N	Every hour	KPT, KSRTC, Kuloor, NMPT
4E	Kankanadi Kavoor	Sulthan Bathery	16C	Every 2 hour	Mallikatta, Nanthoor
13E	Kankanadi Kavoor	Kunjathabail	14F	Every hour	Mallikatta, Nanthoor
13F	Saripalla Kankanadi	Kunjathabail	14G	Every hour	Mallikatta, Nanthoor
17E	Kankanadi	Moodshedde	3K	Every 2 hour	Mallikatta, Nanthoor
18E	Kottara	Permanki	3G	Every 2 hour	Mallikatta, Nanthoor
18F	Kottara	Konimar	3F	Every 2 hour	Mallikatta, Nanthoor
7E	Surathkal	Kunjathbail	13E	Every 30 mins	Kuloor, Kavoor
7F	Katipalla Kaikamba	Kunjathabail	13A	Every hour	Kuloor, Kavoor
7G	Janatha Colony Kaikamba	Kunjathabail	13F	Every 2 hour	Kuloor, Kavoor
8E	Katipalla Kaikamba	Bondel Yeyyadi	14M	Every hour	Kuloor, Kavoor
17F	Katipalla Kaikamba	Moodshedde	3E	Every 30 mins	Kuloor, Kavoor
17G	Janatha Colony Kaikamba	Moodshedde	3F	Every 2 hour	Kuloor, Kavoor
17H	Kuthethur Surathkal	Moodshedde	64	Every 2 hour	Kuloor, Kavoor
26E	Kunjathabail	Bajal J M Road	9C	Every hour	Kuloor, Kavoor
36E	Katipalla Kaikamba	Sashihitlu	2K	Every 2 hour	Krishnapur, Surathkal, Mukka
38G	Porkody, Baikampady	Soorinje Shibaroor	53C	Every 2 hour	Jokkatte, Surathkal, Katipalla
38H	Bajpe, Baikampady	Soorinje Shibaroor	53D	Every 2 hour	Jokkatte, Surathkal, Katipalla
53E	Thokkottu	Kinya Talapady	51T	Every 2 hour	Kuttar, Deralakatte, Natekal
54	Kankanadi	Janatha Colony Kaikamba	65	Every 2 hour	KPT, Kuloor, Surathkal
56	Mangalore Jn	KSRTC Kodical	61	Every 2 hour	Kankanadi Kadri Kottara
57	Mangalore Jn	Katipalla Kaikamba	62	Every 2 hour	Nanthoor, Kavoor
58	Mangalore Jn	Kenjar Airport	63	Every 2 hour	Nanthoor, Kavoor
59	Gorigudda	Akashbhavana	60	Every 1 hour	Kankanadi Kadri Kottara
