= Bondel =

Area of Mangalore in Karnataka, India

- Residential locality
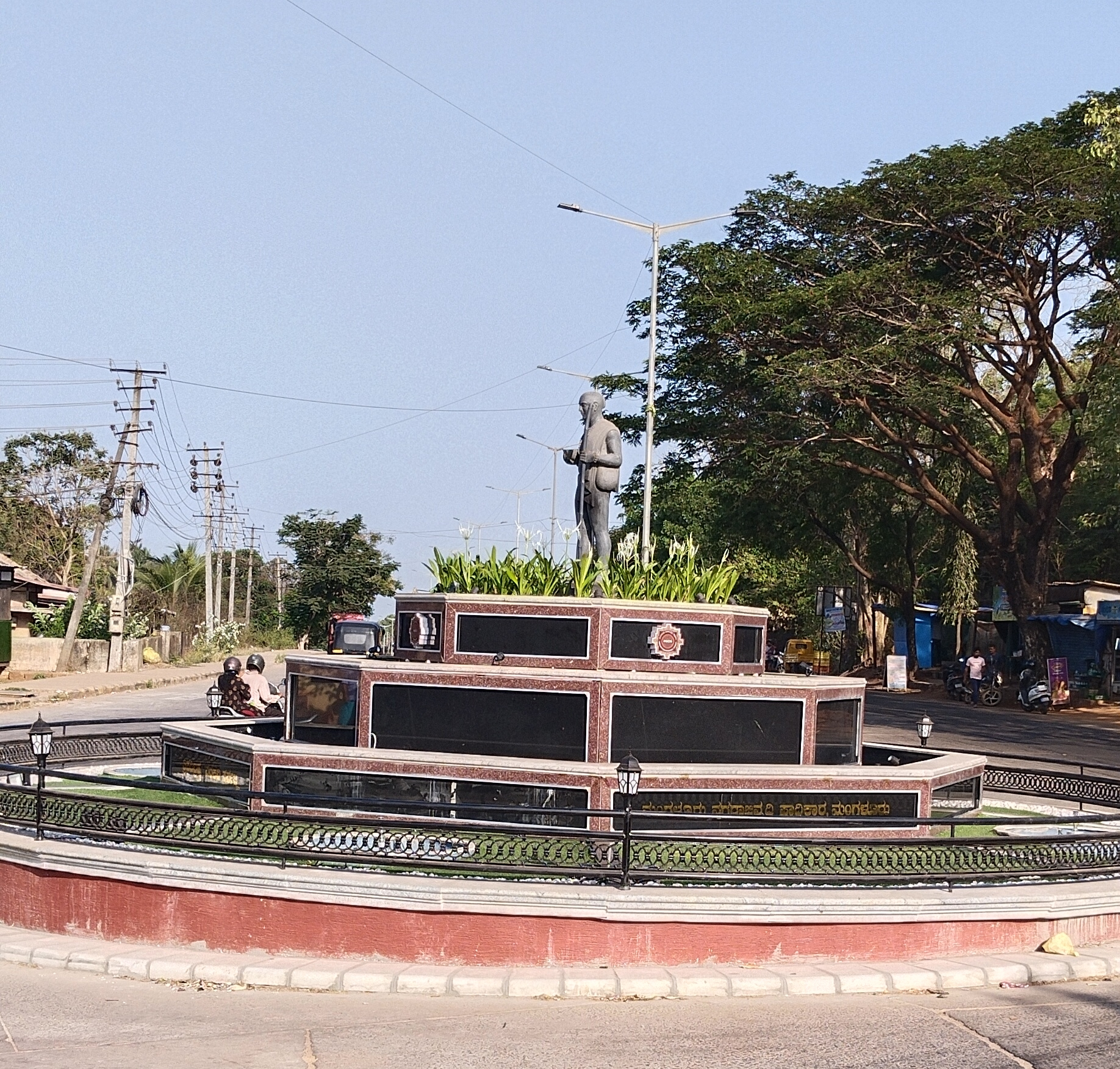
- Poet Sarvajna statue in Bondel junction

- Location within Karnataka Location within India
- Coordinates: 12°55′33″N 74°52′37″E
- Country: India
- State: Karnataka
- District: Dakshina Kannada
- City: Mangalore

Government
  - Body: Mangalore City Corporation

Bondel is a residential locality in the city of Mangalore in Karnataka, India. It is one of the upscale residential localities of Mangalore. Bondel along with Maryhill houses many highrise buildings and is also currently developing rapidly as a commercial center. It lies in Airport Road, which originates in KPT Junction and extends till Mangalore International Airport. Kavoor, one of the major localities of Mangalore, is located nearby. This locality is close to the airport as well.

Daijiworld Media, an Indian private limited media company, is headquartered in Bondel.

== Notable educational institutions nearby ==
- Karnataka (Govt.) Polytechnic, Kadri, Mangalore
- Vikas Pre-University College, Mangalore, Maryhill, Mangalore
- Mount Carmel Central School, Maryhill, Mangalore
- Shree Devi Group of Colleges, Kenjar, Mangalore
- Dr M.V Shetty Group Of Colleges, Kavoor, Mangalore
- Women's Polytechnic, Bondel, Mangalore

== Notable tourist spots nearby ==
- Kadri Park, Kadri, Mangalore - 4.5 km (2.8 mi)
- Pilikula Nisargadhama, Mangalore - 8 km (5.0 mi)
- Bejai Museum, Bejai, Mangalore - 5 km (3.1 mi)
- Aloyseum, Hampankatta, Mangalore - 9 km (5.6 mi)
- St. Aloysius Chapel, Hampankatta, Mangalore - 8 km (5.0 mi)
- Tannirbhavi Beach, Mangalore - 8 km (5.0 mi)
- Panambur Beach, Mangalore - 6 km (3.7 mi)
- NITK Beach, Surathkal, Mangalore - 18 km (11 mi)
- Ullal beach, Ullal, Mangalore - 18 km (11 mi)
- Sasihithlu Beach, Mukka, Mangalore - 25 km (16 mi)

== Accessibility ==
Bondel is well connected by public transport. There are several city buses (19, 13, 14 etc.) from the main bus stop in Statebank, Mangalore and other parts of the city.

Nearest railway stations:

- Mangalore Central railway station, Hampankatta, Mangalore - 11 km (6.8 mi)
- Mangalore Junction railway station, Kankanady, Mangalore - 12 km (7.5 mi)
- Surathkal railway station, Surathkal, Mangalore - 16 km (9.9 mi)

Nearest airport:

- Mangalore International Airport (India) - 9 km (5.6 mi)

== See also ==
- Kadri Manjunath Temple, Kadri, Mangalore
- Gokarnanatheshwara Temple, Kudroli, Mangalore
- Mangaladevi Temple, Bolar, Mangalore
- City Centre Mall, K S Rao Road, Mangalore
- Forum Fiza Mall, Pandeshwar, Mangalore
