= Sri Mahalingeshwara Temple, Kavoor =

Hindu temple in Mangalore

Sri Mahalingeshwara Temple
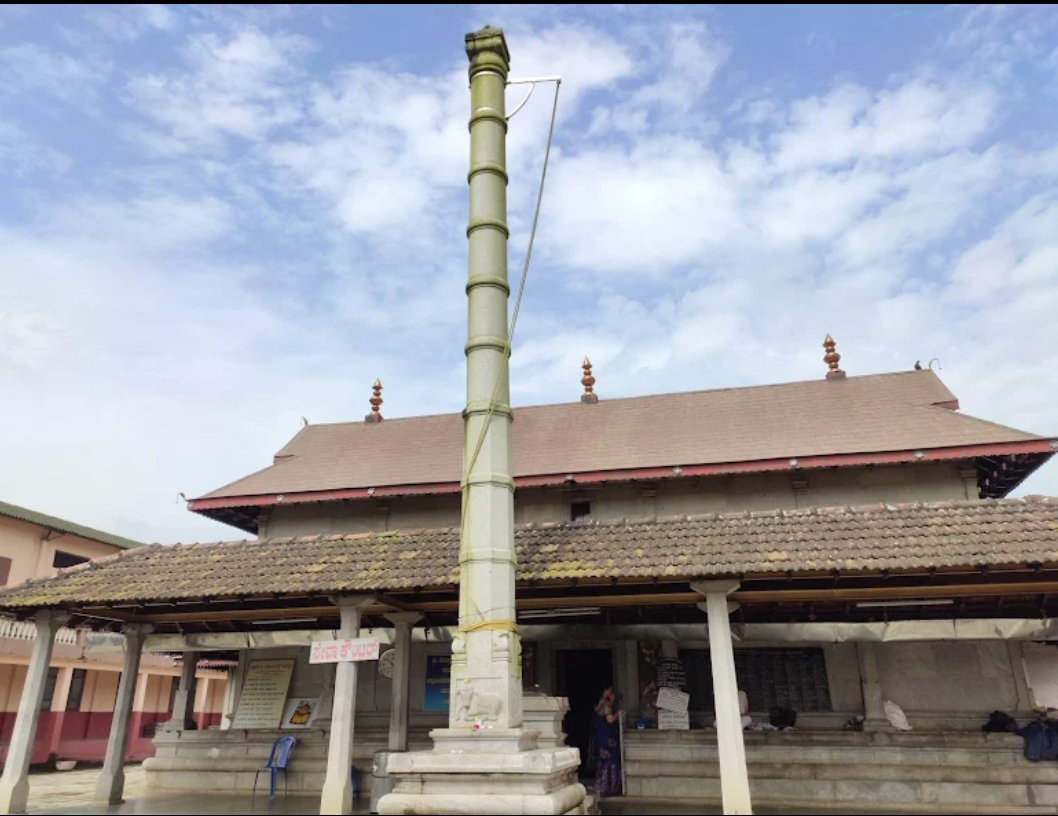

Religion
- Affiliation: Hinduism
- District: Dakshin Kannada
- Festivals: Rathotsva, Maha Shivaratri

Location
- Location: Kavoor, Mangalore
- State: Karnataka
- Country: India
- Interactive map of Sri Mahalingeshwara Temple
- Coordinates: 12.91829°N 74.85864°E

Architecture
- Creator: Maharshi Kavera

Sri Mahalingeshwara Temple, Kavoor is in the Kavoor area of Mangalore, Karnataka, India. It is dedicated to Mahalingeshwara, a form of Lord Shiva. The temple was founded in the 13th or 14th century AD by Maharshi Kavera, who came here to worship Parameswara. He installed a linga and constructed a temple. The idol is established by the sage and worshipped. This is the Shiva temple where lord is Abhishekapriya.

== History ==
Kavoor Mahalingeshwara Temple is a well known Hindu temple in the Kavoor area of Mangalore, Karnataka, India. The temple is dedicated to Lord Shiva and is believed to be one of the oldest temples in the region. Kavoor Mahalingeshwara Temple was founded in the 13th or 14th century AD by Maharshi Kavera. The temple was originally built as a small shrine, but was later expanded and renovated by various rulers over the centuries. The temple was once part of the Gouda Saraswat Brahmin community. However, in the 16th century, it came under the control of the Bunt community. The Bunt community has been managing the temple ever since. During the 17th century, the temple was renovated by the Keladi Nayakas. They added a beautiful wooden chariot, which is still used during the annual car festival. The temple was also renovated in the 19th century by the Heggade rulers of the Dharmasthala temple.

== Architecture ==
The architecture of Kavoor Mahalingeshwara Temple is a blend of Dravidian and Hoysala styles. The temple has a unique design and layout that sets it apart from other temples in the region. It has a rectangular shape, with the main entrance facing east. The temple complex consists of the main shrine, several smaller shrines, and a large open space in front of the main shrine, The walls of the temple are decorated with intricate carvings and sculptures that depict various Hindu deities and mythological scenes. The main shrine of the temple is a three-tiered structure that houses the main deity, Lord Mahalingeshwara, depicted in a standing posture, with four hands holding a trident, a damaru, a serpent, and a bowl. The top of the shrine is adorned with a carved stone pinnacle decorated with images of gods and goddesses. The temple also has a large wooden chariot that is used during the annual car festival. The chariot is beautifully decorated with flowers, lights and colorful paintings of Hindu deities and mythological scenes.

== Festivals ==
Kavoor Mahalingeshwara Temple is known for its vibrant an colorful festivals that are celebrated with great enthusiasm and devotion.

=== Maha Shivaratri ===
This is the most important festival celebrated at Kavoor Mahalingeshwara Temple. It is celebrated in the month of February or March, and it is dedicated to Lord Shiva. Devotees fast and offer prayers to the deity throughout the night.

=== Rathotsva ===
This is the annual car festival that is celebrated in the month of February or March. During the festival, the deity is taken out in a beautiful decorated wooden chariot, and it is pulled by devotees around the temple. The festival attracts a large number of devotees from all over the region.

== Gallery ==
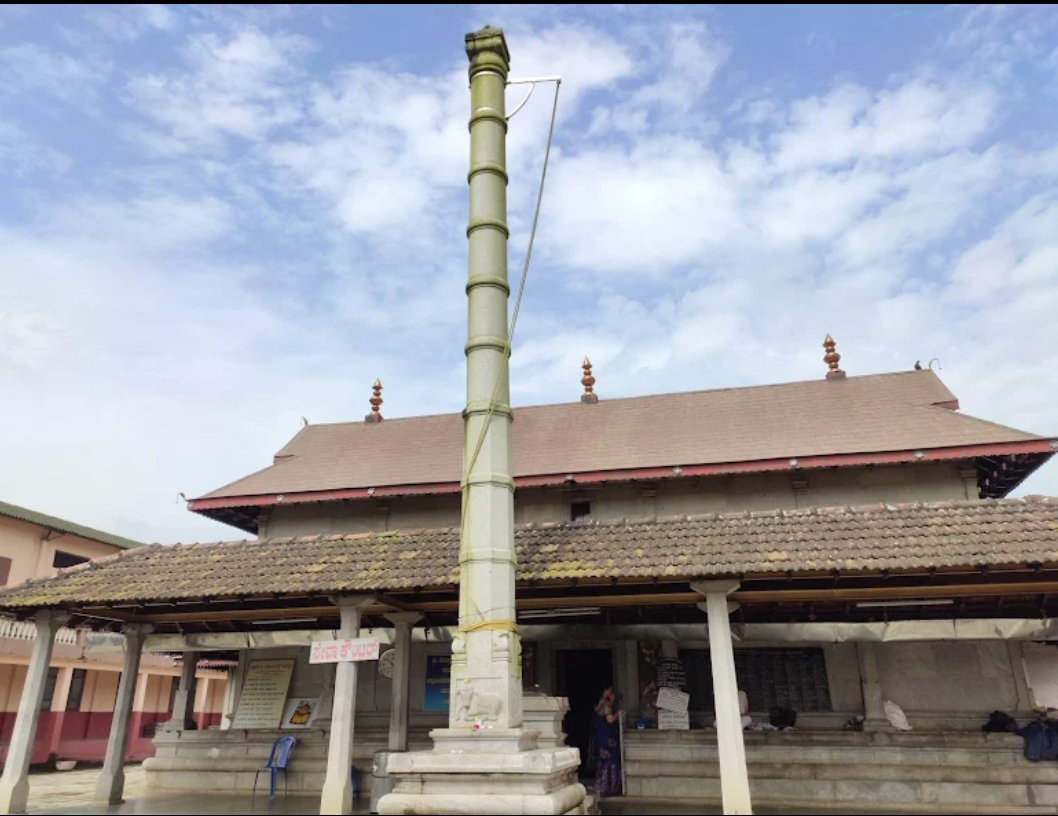
Kavoor Sri Mahalingeshwara Temple

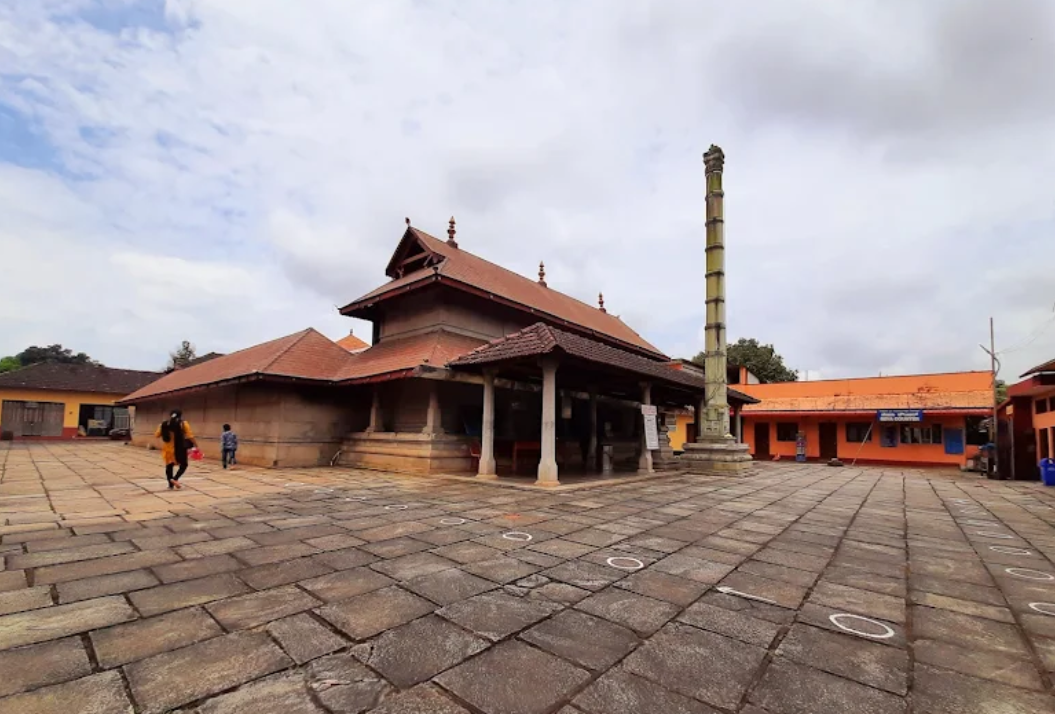
wide view of Mahalingeshwara temple

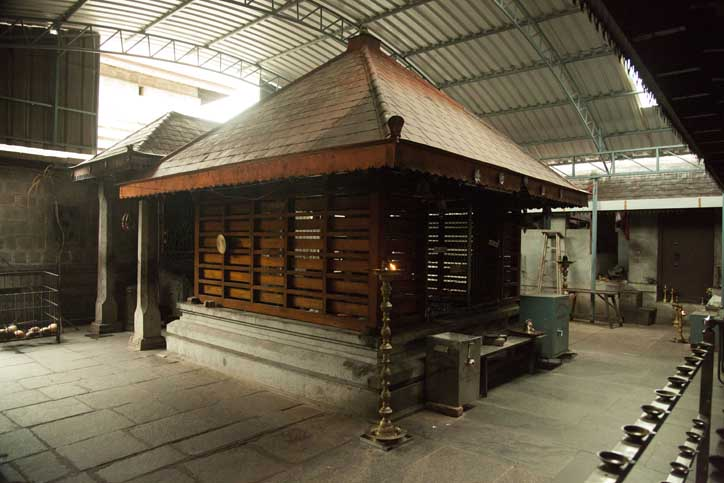
Inside view of Temple

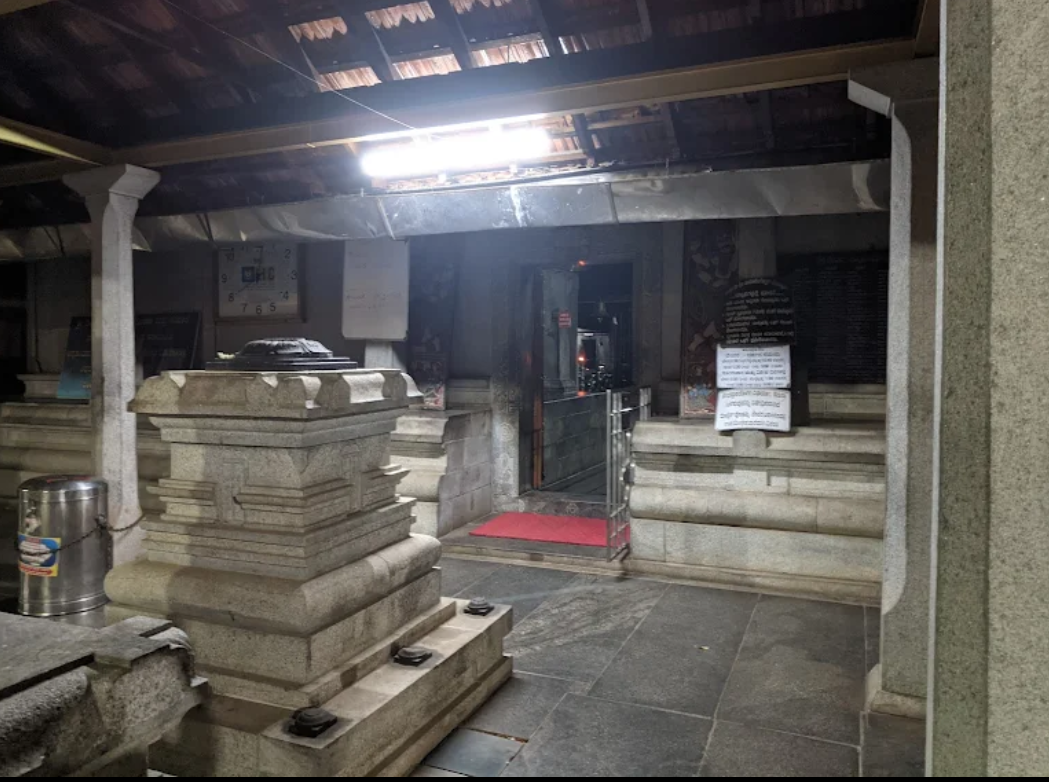
Inside view of Temple

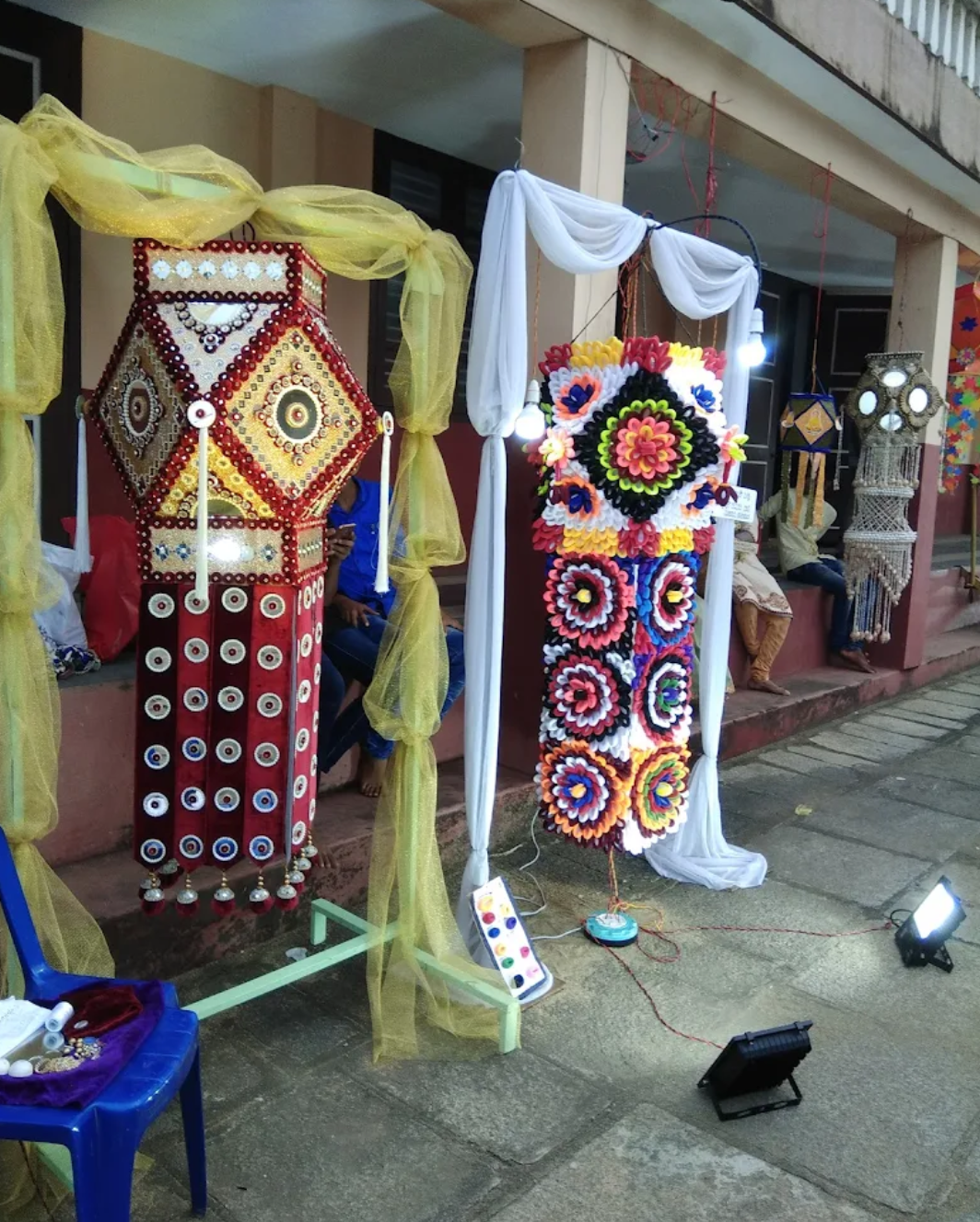
Goodu deepa in Deepavali festival

== See also ==
- Mangaladevi Temple
- Gokarnanatheshwara Temple
- Kadri Manjunath Temple
- Mariyamma Temple
