= KPT =

KPT may refer to:

- Kai's Power Tools, a set of API plugins
- Karachi Port Trust
- Karnataka (Govt.) Polytechnic, a government collage in India
- Kertapati railway station, Palembang, South Sumatra, Indonesia (station code: KPT)
- Xanthan ketal pyruvate transferase, an enzyme
- Kilpatrick railway station, West Dunbartonshire, Scotland, by National Rail station code
- Koparit, a sports club in Kuopio, Finland
- Kennebunkport a town in Maine
