= Kotekara =

- village
- Location in Karnataka, India
- Coordinates: 12.796°N 74.874°E
- Country: India
- State: Karnataka
- District: Dakshina Kannada

Population (2001)
  - Total: 14,323

Languages
  - Official: Kannada
- Time zone: UTC+5:30 (IST)

Kotekara is a census town in Dakshina Kannada district in the Indian state of Karnataka.Kotekar is located on NH-17 south of Mangalore towards Talapady.

== Demographics ==
As of 2001 India census, Kotekara had a population of 14,323. Males constitute 48% of the population and females 52%. Kotekara has an average literacy rate of 80%, higher than the national average of 59.5%: male literacy is 85%, and female literacy is 76%. In Kotekara, 10% of the population is under 6 years of age.
