= Lalbagh, Mangalore =

- Location in Mangalore city, Karnataka, India
- Coordinates: 12.847570278312854°N 74.86718090380129°E

Lalbagh is situated about 3 km to the north of Hampankatta, Mangalore, India

The main office of the Mangalore City Corporation is also located here

== Public utilities ==
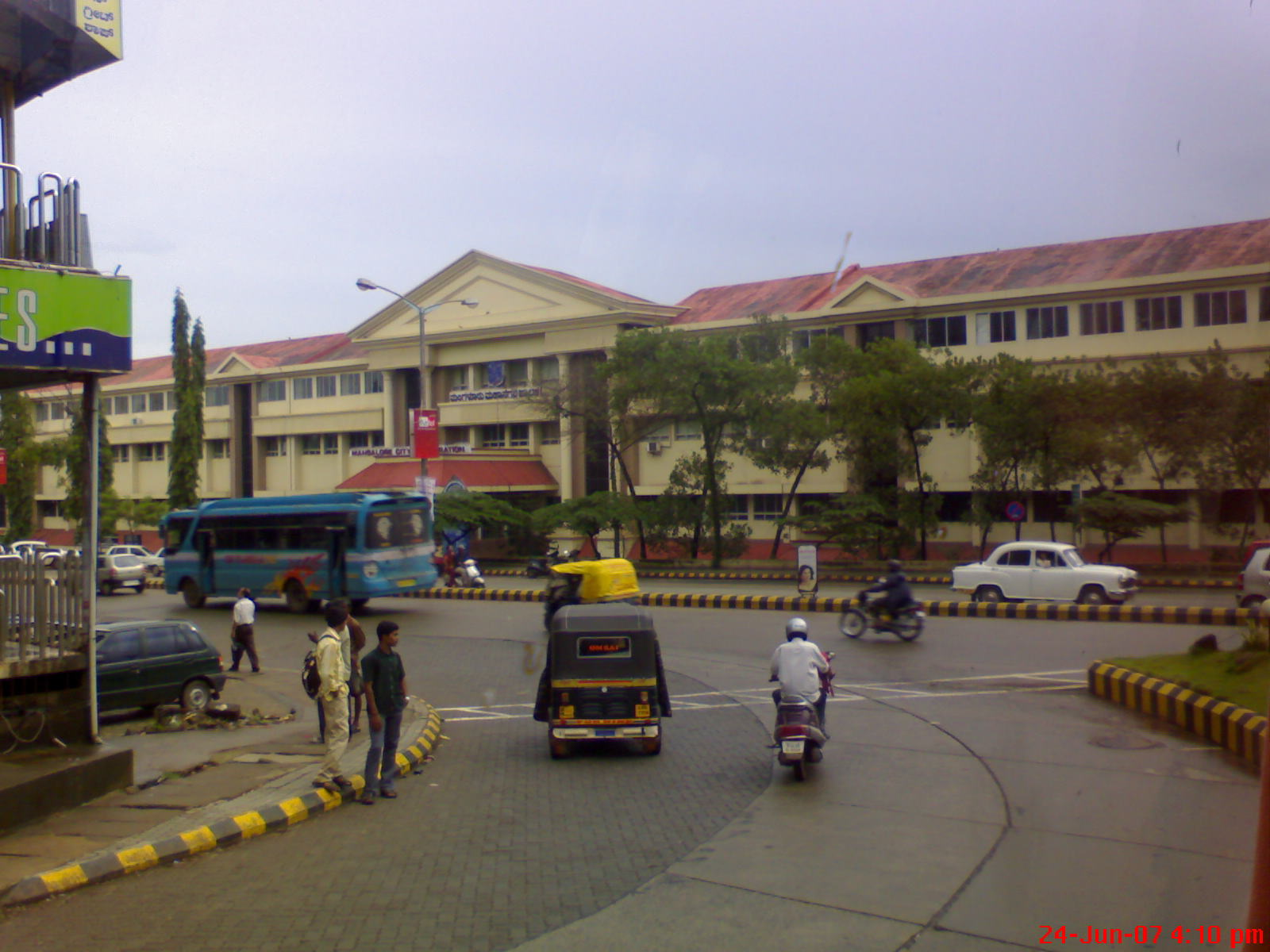
Front View of MCC Headquarters at Lalbagh

- Mangalore City Corporation Headquarters: The headquarters of the Mangalore City corporation is located in this building.
- Bejai bus stand: The state-run KSRTC buses start from here, unlike the private buses which start from State Bank.
- Mangala Stadium: This stadium hosts sports events in the city.
- U S Mallya Indoor Stadium: Stadium for Basketball and Badminton
- Public swimming pool: This swimming pool is run by the city corporation and open to the public.
- Lalbagh House: This house was originally built by Mr. Rupert Fernandes then belonged to his wife Mrs. Celine Fernandes and now belongs to her youngest son Mr. Alfred Fernandes.
