= Rajyotsava Awards (2013) =

Awards given by the government of Karnataka, India

2013 Rajyotsava Awards
- Date: 1 November 2013
- Location: Bangalore, Karnataka
- Country: India
- Presented by: Government of Karnataka

The list of Karnataka Rajyotsava Award recipients for the year 2013 is below.

== List of awardees ==
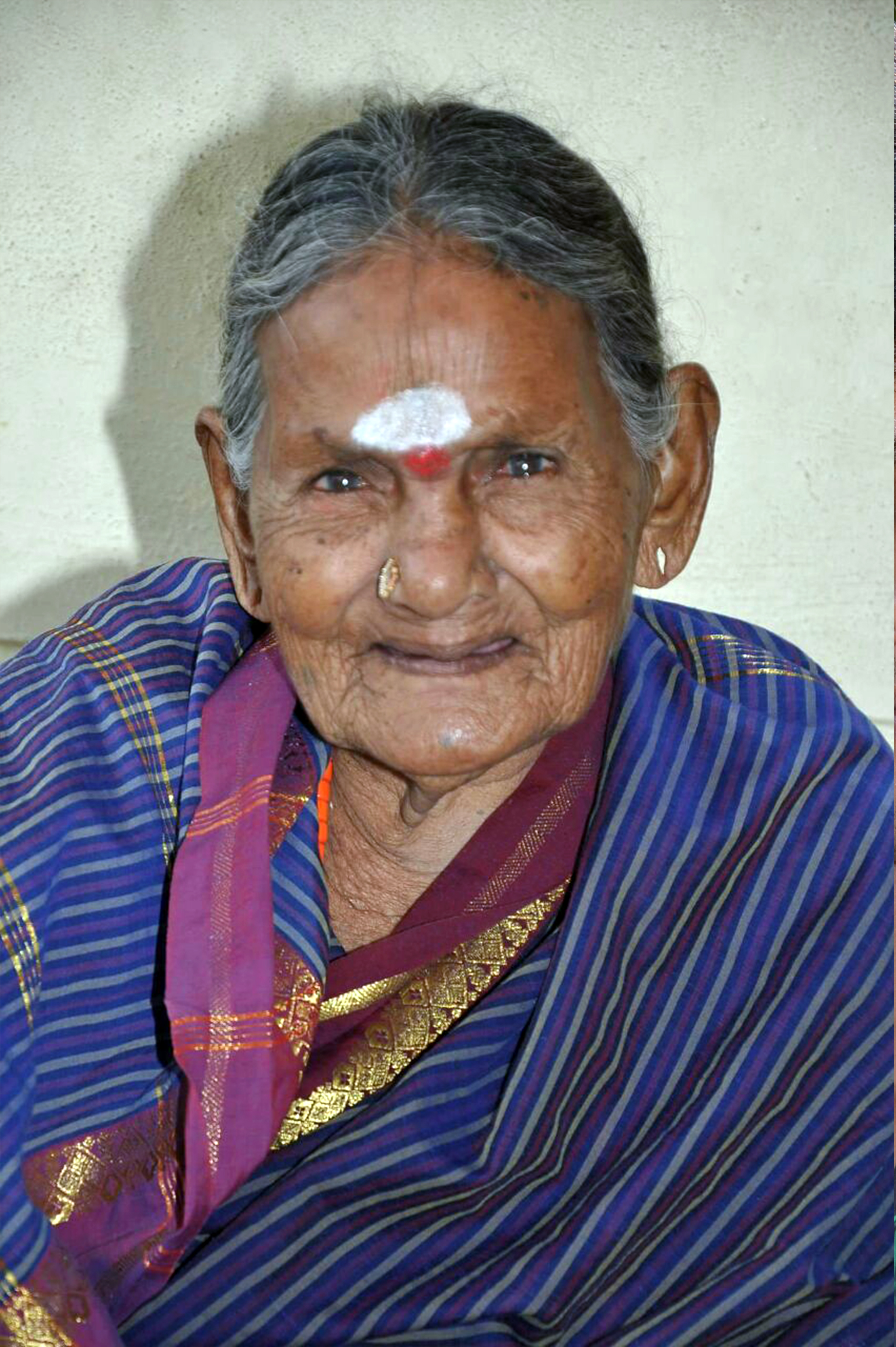
Sulagitti Narasamma

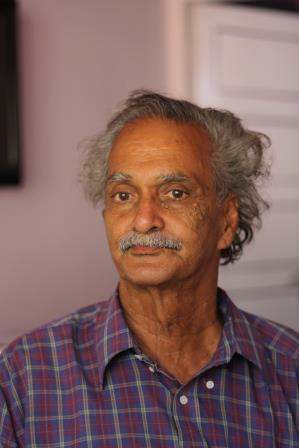
K. P. Rao

Recipient	Field
Ko. Channabasappa	Literature
Chandrakanth Kusanur	Literature
Mallika Ghanti	Literature
K. B. Siddaiah	Literature
Srikantha Koodige	Literature
Gajanan Harimahale	Theatre
H. V. Venkatasubbaiah	Theatre
N. Rathna	Theatre
Florina Bai	Theatre
Shashidhar Adapa	Theatre
Sohan Kumari	Music
Fayaz Khan	Music
Basavaraj Thirakappa Bhajantri	Music
Hanumantha Rao Gonavar	Music
M. Shakuntala Hanumanthappa	Dance
Shanthi Nayak	Folklore
Elisappa Madara	Folklore
Bannur Kempamma	Folklore
Mahadevappa Monappa Badiger	Folklore
Sharanappa Vadigeri	Folklore
K. M. Raghava Nambiar	Yakshagana
Narayana Hasyagara Nellikatte	Yakshagana
Rayappa Sangappa Kumbar	Yakshagana
Lakshmi Bai Salahalli	Yakshagana
Sulagitti Narasamma	Social Work
Kondajji B. Shanumkhappa	Social Work
Myna Gopalakrishna	Social Work
T. Raja	Social Work
Basavalingappa S. Jamakhandi	Social Work
Aarathi Krishna	Overseas Kannadiga
Harekala Hajabba	Others
Eshwar Chandra Chintamani	Others
Soogaiah Hiremath	Others
Shaheen Educational Association	Institution
B. B. Bannada Janapada Kalamela	Institution
K. P. Rao	Science
S. Aiyappan	Science
K. Narayana Swamy	Agriculture
M. D. Subhash Chandra	Agriculture
Anasuyamma	Agriculture
Vasanth Kumar Thimakapur	Agriculture
C. M. Mutthiah	Sports
G. H. Thulasidhar	Sports
Sadashiva Saliyan	Sports
Sheela Gowda	Fine Arts
Alibaba S. Nadaf	Fine Arts
T. M. Mayachar	Fine Arts
Vijay Hagargundgi	Fine Arts
V. Lakshmi Narayana	Medicine
K. Sundaranath Suvarna	Cinema
R. Rathna	Cinema
Lokanath	Cinema
Girija Lokesh	Cinema
Gudihalli Nagaraj	Media
C. G. Manjula	Media
R. P. Venkatesha Murthy	Media
P. Mohammed	Media
S. R. Venkatesh Prasad	Media
