= Harekala Hajabba =

Social reformer

Padma Shri Akshara Santha Harekala Hajabba
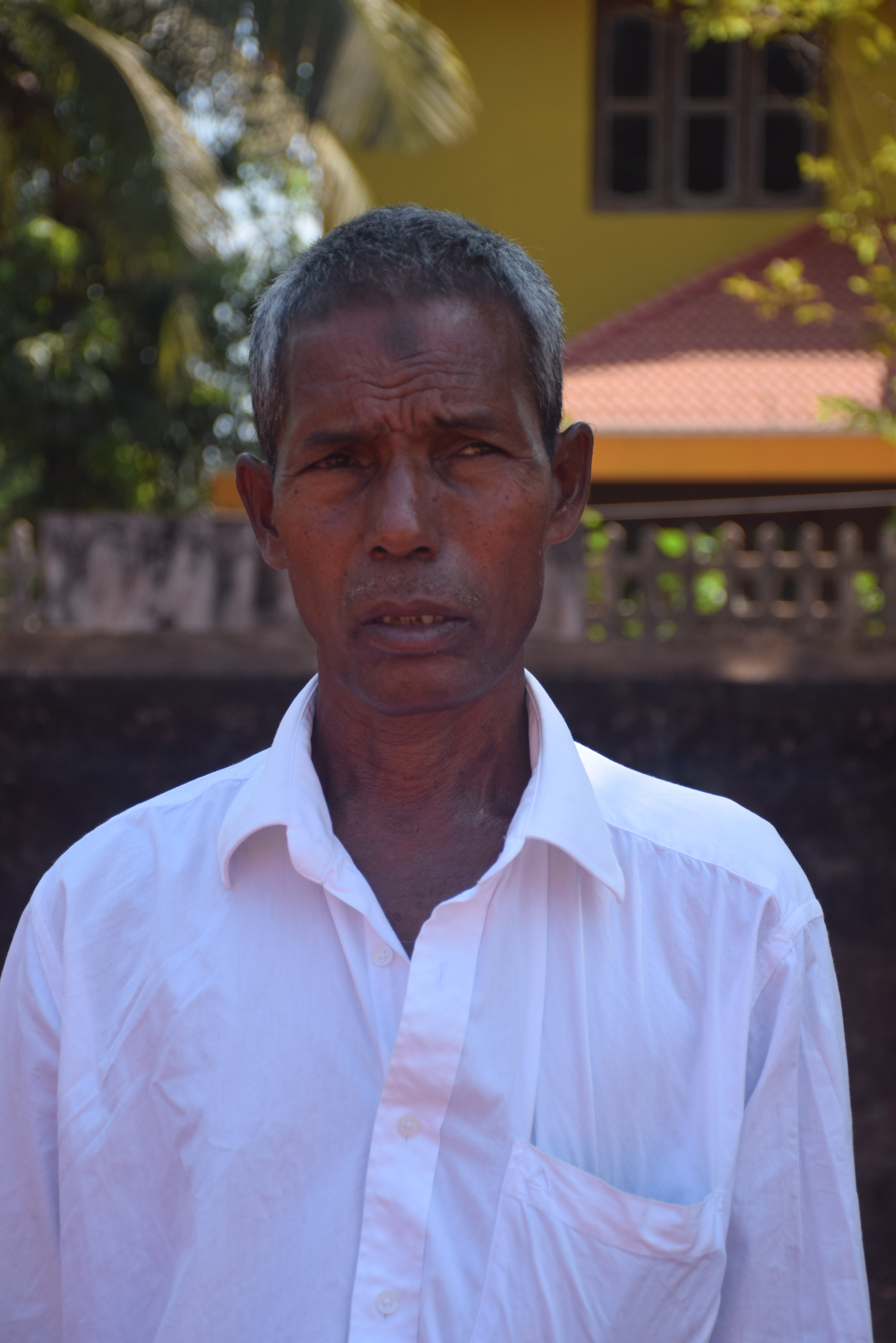
- Born: 17 October 1956 (age 69); Harekala, Mangalore, Dakshina Kannada, Karnataka
- Known for: Social Service
- Awards: Padma Shri (2020)

Padma Shri recipient Harekala Hajabba is an Indian social activist and orange vendor living and working in the city of Mangaluru, Karnataka, India. He saved money from his business to build a school in his village. In 2020, he was awarded the Padma Shri, India's fourth-highest civilian award, for his initiative and achievement.

== Biography ==
Dr. Harekala Hajabba was born into a Muslim family of very modest financial means, he dropped out of school at an early age in order to earn money and contribute towards family expenses. Many years ago, when a foreign tourist asked him the price of an orange in English, he did not understand what had been said and felt embarrassed. He had not had the privilege of any kind of formal education. That day he vowed to make a school in his village, which was deprived of school. He kept part of his savings from selling oranges, to start a school in his village, Newpadapu. He was able to start a small school. Today, the school, which has grown with government support and donations from private individuals, is known as Hajabba School. He is affectionately known as 'Akshara Santa' (letter-saint). He is known for the extraordinary contribution he made, despite his own relatively constrained circumstances, to the cause of education in his native village. Hajabba's next dream is to build a Pre-University college in his village.

== Recognition and honours ==
- Social activist and writer Ismath Pajeer has published a book on Hajabba's life, titled Aparupada Samaja Sevaka (Life story of Harekala Hajabba).
- A life history of Hajabba has been included in the syllabus of Mangalore University.
- The BBC published an article on Hajabba with the title "Unlettered fruit-seller's Indian education dream" in November 2012.
- Hajabba was conferred with the Real Heroes Award by CNN IBN and Reliance Foundation.
- Hajabba was named Person Of The Year by Kannada Prabha, a leading Kannada-language newspaper.
- In 2020, the government of India conferred the nation's fourth-highest civilian award, the Padma Shri, on Hajabba.
- In 2012, government of Karnataka awarded him with state's second highest civilian award Rajyotsava Prashasti on the occasion of Kannada Rajyotsava.
