= State bank (disambiguation) =

A state bank is a financial institution chartered by a state in countries such as Australia or the United States.

State bank may also refer to:

- Central bank, an institution that manages the monetary policy of a country or monetary union
- Public bank, a financial institution in which a state, municipality, or public actors are the owners

== Central banks ==
- State Bank of Pakistan
- State Bank of Vietnam

Former central banks:

- State Bank of the Russian Empire (1762-1917)
- State Bank of the Soviet Union (1922-1991)
- Croatian State Bank (1941-1945)
- State Bank of the Socialist People Republic of Albania(1945-1992)
- State Bank of Czechoslovakia (1950-1992)
- State Bank of the German Democratic Republic (1968-1990)

== Other banks ==
=== Australia ===
- State Bank of New South Wales, a former bank
- State Bank of South Australia, rebranded as BankSA
- State Bank of Victoria, a former bank

=== India ===
- State Bank of India, an Indian multinational public sector bank
- State Bank of Hyderabad, former associate bank of the State Bank of India
- State Bank of Indore, former associate bank of the State Bank of India
- State Bank of Mysore, former associate bank of the State Bank of India
- State Bank of Patiala, former associate bank of the State Bank of India
- State Bank of Saurashtra, former associate bank of the State Bank of India
- State Bank of Travancore, former associate bank of the State Bank of India
- State Bank of Bikaner & Jaipur, former subsidiary of the State Bank of India

=== United States ===
- State bank (United States), a bank chartered at the state level

=== Other countries ===
- China State Bank
- Bavarian State Bank
- Prussian State bank
- State Bank (Mongolia)
- State Bank of Morocco
- State Mortgage Bank of Yugoslavia

== See also ==
- State Bank Building (Rostov-on-Don)
- State Bank Tower, Port Louis, Mauritius
- National bank (disambiguation)
- Reserve Bank (disambiguation)
