= Konaje =

- Locality
- Entrance of Mangalore University, Konaje

- Location in Karnataka, India
- Coordinates: 12°49′2.027″N 74°55′17.23″E
- Country: India
- State: Karnataka
- District: Dakshina Kannada

Languages
  - Official: Kannada, Tulu, English
- Time zone: UTC+5:30 (IST)
- PIN: 574199
- Nearest city: Mangalore
- Lok Sabha constituency: Dakshina Kannada
- Vidhan Sabha constituency: Mangalore

Konaje is a locality in Mangalore generally known as the educational hub. Konaje is governed by Dakshina Kannada zilla Panchayath.

It is home to the vast campus of the Mangalore University which is also known as Mangalagangothri. The university is located on hill top. Deralakatte which houses two medical colleges is on way from Thokottu to Konaje. Software Major Infosys Technologies has a software development center in Konaje.

There are many city buses (Route no. 51) from Mangalore City Bus Stand (State Bank) to Konaje. Alternatively, shuttle buses are available with good frequency. It is about 40 minute drive from Hampankatta. Konaje can be reached by taking turn at Thokottu on National Highway 66 from Mangalore towards Talapady.

Vishwamangala School and College, which was mainly built for the children of university employees is also located here

The locality enjoys close proximity with P A College of Engineering, which is just three kilometres away and also mudipu Infosys
