= State bank =

Financial institution that is chartered by a state

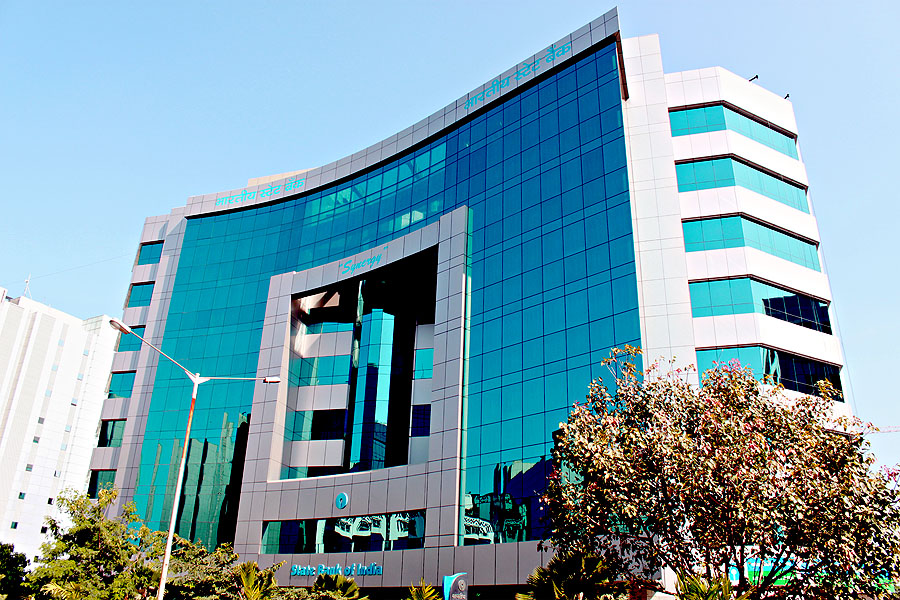
State Bank of India, Mumbai

In Australia and the United States, a state bank in a federated state is usually a financial institution that is chartered by the government of that state, as opposed to one regulated at the federal or national level.

In British English, the term is more or less synonymous with the term "national bank", which refers to any bank owned and operated by a government or state.

== Australia ==
Each Australian state formerly had a state bank, but all have since been privatised.

- New South Wales
  - Government Savings Bank of New South Wales: established 1871, collapsed 1931 and taken over by Commonwealth Bank
  - State Bank of New South Wales: established 1933, privatised and sold to Colonial Mutual in 1994
- Queensland
  - Queensland Government Savings Bank: established 1865, taken over by Commonwealth Bank of Australia in 1920
- South Australia
  - Savings Bank of South Australia: established 1848 as a private institution, nationalised in 1945, merged into the State Bank of South Australia in 1984
  - State Bank of South Australia: established 1896, collapsed in 1991, subsequently privatised and rebranded as BankSA
- Tasmania
  - State Savings Bank of Tasmania: established 1902, taken over by Commonwealth Bank in 1913
- Victoria
  - State Bank of Victoria: established 1842, collapsed in 1991 and sold to the Commonwealth Bank
- Western Australia
  - Bank of Western Australia: established 1895, privatised and sold to Bank of Scotland in 1995, now owned by Commonwealth Bank trading as Bankwest
  - State Savings Bank of Western Australia: established 1863, taken over by Commonwealth Bank in 1931

== United States ==
In the United States, the terms "state-chartered bank" or "state-chartered savings bank" are used in contradistinction to "national bank" or "federal savings bank", which are technically chartered across all US states. A national bank must have "National" or "N.A." in its corporate name, a Federal Savings Bank must have "Federal" or "F.S.B." in its name, while a state chartered bank cannot have "National" or "Federal" in its name. All national banks and savings institutions are chartered and regulated by the Office of the Comptroller of the Currency.

State banks are chartered and regulated by a state agency (often called the Department of Financial Institutions) in the state in which its headquarters are located. In addition, state banks that are members of the Federal Reserve are regulated by the Federal Reserve; state banks that are not members of the Federal Reserve are regulated by the Federal Deposit Insurance Corporation (FDIC). Therefore, virtually every state chartered bank has both a state and federal regulator. There are a very small number of state banks that do not have FDIC insurance.

== Other countries ==
Usage of the term "state bank" varies in other countries. It is often a national bank of some type.

In India, the State Bank of India is an Indian multinational public sector bank and financial services statutory body. It is a defined type of bank in India known as a public sector bank, and the largest bank in India. It was founded as a private commercial bank, then nationalised by the Government of India, and the product of several mergers. Meanwhile, the State Bank of Vietnam is defined as an executive department under the Government of Vietnam, being the country's central bank that represents the government to manage functions of monetary, banking and foreign exchange operations as well as being the designated issuer of the national currency đồng.

== See also ==
- State bank (disambiguation)
- Bayerische Staatsbank
- State Bank of Morocco
- State Bank of Pakistan
- Prussian State bank
- State Bank of Vietnam
