= Kulur, Mangaluru =

Kulur or Kuloor is a locality in Mangaluru city, Karnataka, India about 7 kilometres (4.3 mi) north of the city centre. Kulur is one of the major commercial junctions in the city.

== Transport links ==
Kulur is on National Highway 66, the main west coast road running south from Panvel, Maharashtra. The highway crosses the Gurupura River via the Kulur Bridge into Kulur, bypasses Mangaluru city centre to the east, before continuing on into Kerala. The southbound Kular Bridge was built in 1952 and is of a bowstring arch truss design while the northbound is a reinforced concrete girder bridge. As of March 2023, a new six-lane bridge is under construction between the two existing bridges. A main road runs east from Kulur Junction to Kavoor where it connects to State Highway 67 northbound to Mangalore international airport.

== Tourism ==
The River Festival of Mangaluru was held at Kulur along with Bangrakulur & Tannirbhavi. The district administration and Mangaluru City Corporation proposed the building of a permanent jetty at Kulur, to promote the backwater tourism of Mangaluru along Gurupura River. The Kulur-Tannirbhavi corridor will be developed as a major tourist attraction under the Smart City Project.

== Schools & Colleges in Kulur ==
- Kulur High School
- VIBGYOR Roots and Rise, Kulur
- AJ Institute of Engineering & Technology.
