= Adyar, Karnataka =

Adyar
- town
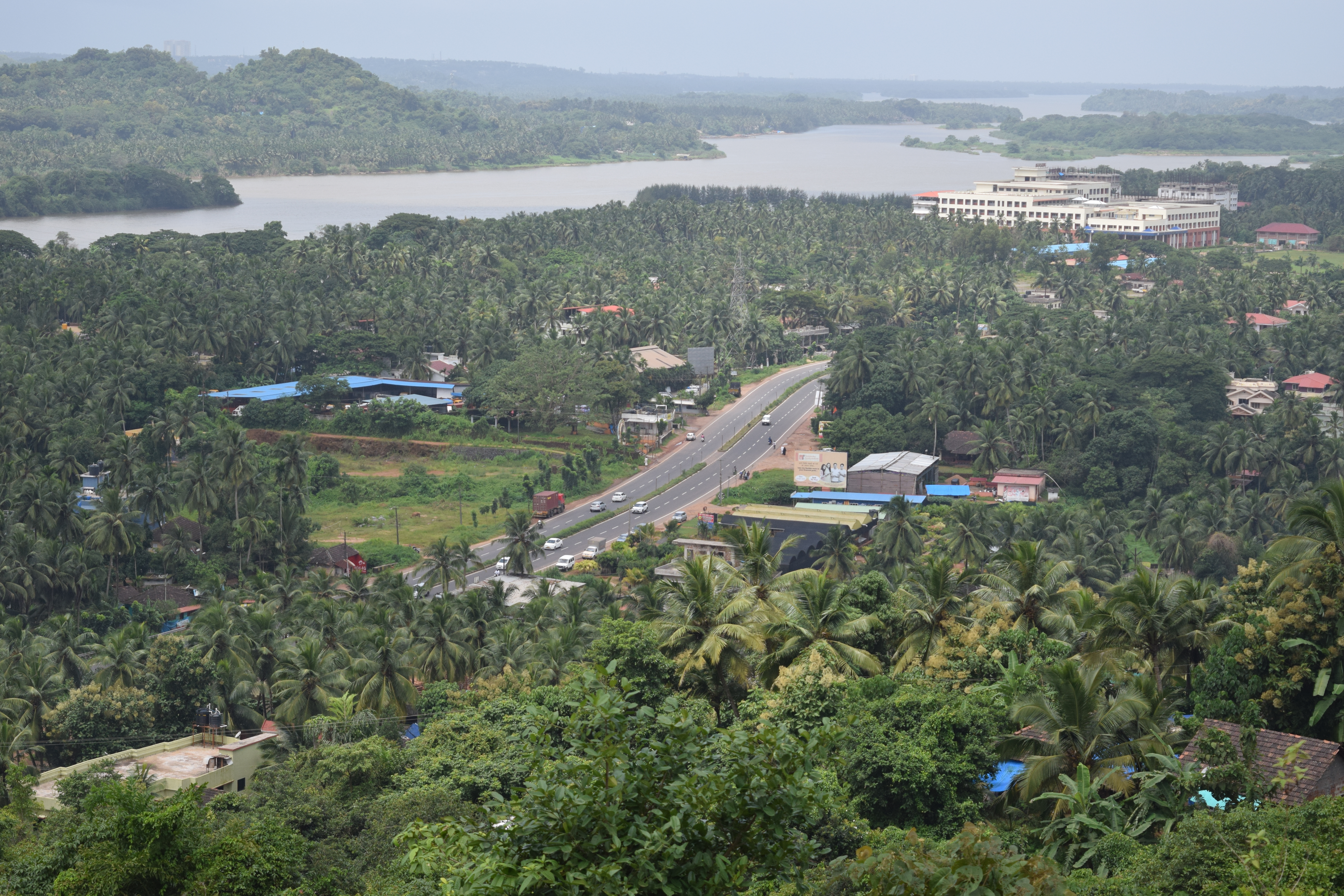
- View over Adyar, looking towards Mangalore from Adyar Falls

- Location in Karnataka, India Adyar (India)
- Coordinates: 12.87°N 74.91°E
- Country: India
- State: Karnataka
- Talukas: Mangalore

Population (2001)
  - Total: 6,501
- Time zone: UTC+5:30 (IST)
- ISO 3166 code: IN-KA
- Vehicle registration: KA

Adyar is a suburb of Mangalore city in Karnataka, India.

== Geography ==
Adyar is situated on the north bank of the Netravati River approximately 10 km to the east of central Mangalore.

Adyar is north-west of the Pavoor Uliya island, which it is connected to via a footbridge. The footbridge is closed during monsoon season. Other local sites of interest include the Adyar Falls, a series of waterfalls.

The 520m Harekala-Adyar road bridge was completed in April 2023, connecting Adyar to Harekala on the south side of the Netravati River and providing a source of water supply to the Mangalore region.

National Highway 73 runs through Adyar.

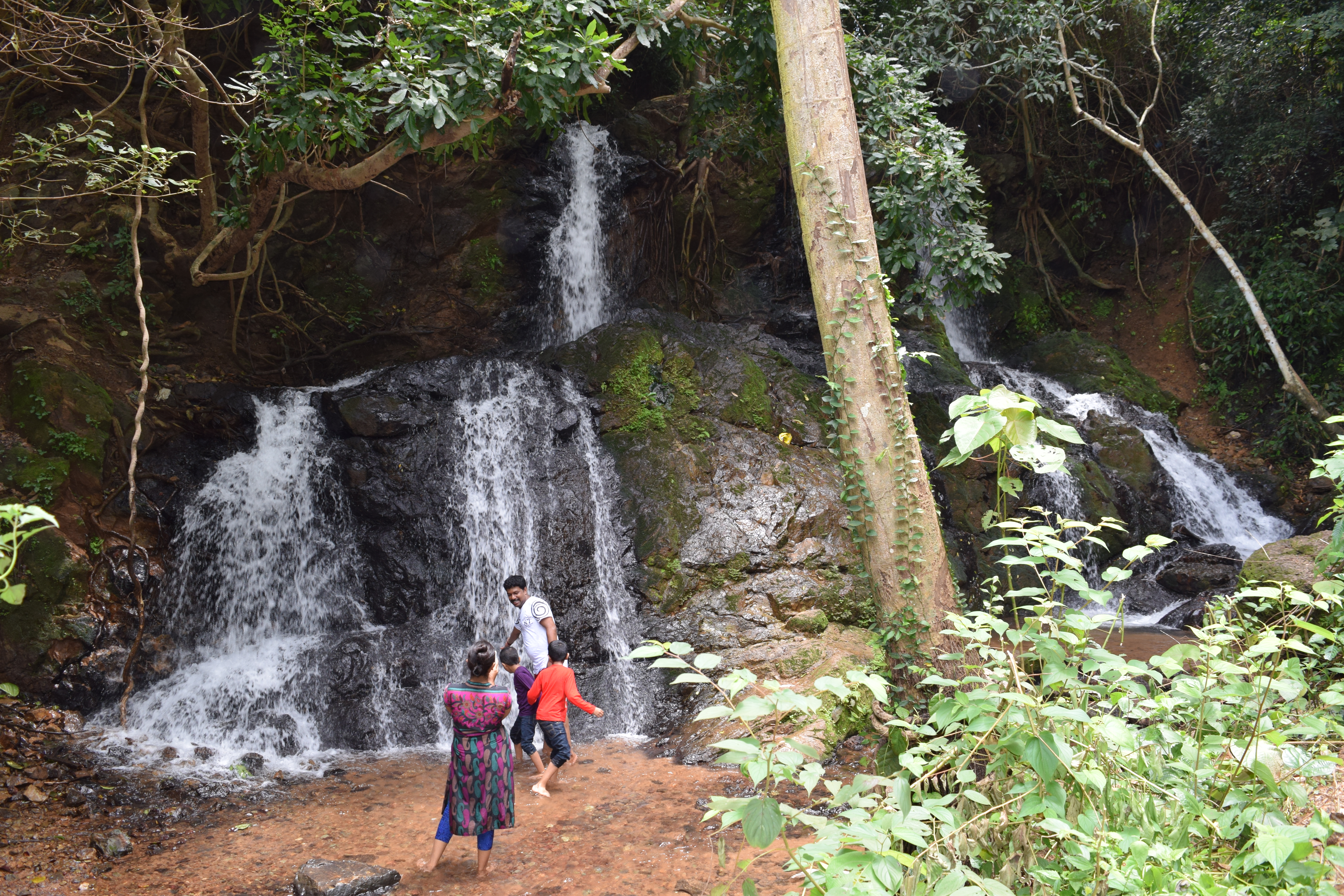
Adayar Falls

== Demographics ==
As of 2001 India census, Adyar had a population of 6501. Males constitute 50% of the population and females 50%. Adyar has an average literacy rate of 73%, higher than the national average of 59.5%, with 78% of males and 68% of females literate. 13% of the population is under 6 years of age.
