= Kinnya =

Kinnya Kinya
- village
- Location in Karnataka, India
- Coordinates: 12.7782°N 74.8793°E
- Country: India
- State: Karnataka
- District: Dakshina Kannada

Government
  - Type: Panchayat raj
  - Body: Gram panchayat

Population
  - Total: 6,800

Languages
  - Official: Beary language, Tulu
- Time zone: UTC+5:30 (IST)
- Postal code: 575023
- ISO 3166 code: IN-KA
- Vehicle registration: KA 19
- Website: karnataka.gov.in

Kinnya or Kinya is a village in Ullal taluk, Dakshina Kannada district of Karnataka state, India. The ancient Talapady Durga Parameshwari Temple is in this village. The village Kinnya lies near Arabian Sea Shared Border with Thalapady, Kotekar, Naringana And Manjanady Village. Total Population 6800, Native Language is Tulu and some Kannada although there are now a decent amount Beary speaking families living here. It is located 23 km south of Mangalore city.

In local Tulu language Kinya means small. The Durga Parameshwari Temple was recently renovated in the year 2015. Shree Durga Parameshwari temple is the family deity (Kuladevi) of many people who are the natives of undivided South Canara (South Kanara) District (now, Dakshina Kannada, Udupi and Kasargod). The village code is 02699400 as per Karnataka Administrative atlas 2001 published by DCO of Karnataka state. Pincode of Kinya village post office is 575023. There is a Zilla Panchayat Higher Primary school at Kinnya.
