= Kavoor, Mangalore =

Suburb of Mangalore in Karnataka, India

Kavoor
- Suburb and ward
- Kavoor junction in Mangalore

- Location in Karnataka, India
- Coordinates: 12°55′34″N 74°51′30″E
- Country: India
- State: Karnataka
- District: Dakshina Kannada
- City: Mangalore
- Regional: Tulu Nadu

Government
  - Body: Mangalore City Corporation

Area
  - Total: 441.88 ha (1,091.9 acres)

Population (2011)
  - Total: 16,321

Languages
  - Official: Kannada
  - Regional: Tulu, Beary, Konkani
- Time zone: UTC+5:30 (IST)
- PIN: 575015
- Vehicle registration: KA-19

Kavoor is a suburban area and the name of a ward in the city of Mangalore in the Mysore division of the Indian state of Karnataka. Kannada and Tulu are the two most commonly spoken languages in Kavoor. This place got the name as "Kavoor" because of the Saint "Kuvera Maharshi" who had visited this place. It connects major cities like Surathkal, Kankanady, Kinnigoli, and Bajpe.

== Overview ==
Kavoor is a neighborhood and ward of the city of Mangalore, in the Dakshina Kannada district of Karnataka about 7 kilometres (4.3 mi) north of the city's central shopping area of Market Street and the City Center shopping mall. The Mangalore-Bajpe Airport Road passes through the area and links Kavoor to Mangalore International Airport.

Kavoor is primarily a residential area with a mix of independent houses and apartment complexes. The neighbourhood has witnessed significant development in recent years. New buildings for Kavoor police station were opened in June 2014.

== Notable tourist spots nearby ==
- Pilikula Nisargadhama
- Kadri Park
- Panambur Beach
- Tannirbhavi Beach
- Kavoor lake

== Transport links ==
=== Bus ===
Kavoor has a good network of public buses that connect it to different parts of Mangalore City and nearby towns.The Karnataka State Road Transport Corporation (KSRTC) and private bus operators run regular services from Kavoor to different destinations.

=== Rail ===
Mangalore Central railway station in the city centre is about 7 kilometres (4.3 mi) away.

=== Air ===
Mangalore International Airport is about 3.5 kilometres (2.2 mi) to the north.

== Religious places ==
- Kavoor Sri Mahalingeshwara Temple
- Shree Guru Vaidyanatha Babbu swami Devastana, Kavoor
- Marakada Kshethra, Marakada
- Anjaneya Swami Temple, Jyothi Nagara
- Shri Chamundeshwari, Jyothi Nagara
- Kavoor Jumma Masjid

== Nearby Educational Institutes ==
- BGS Education Center, Kavoor
- St. Lawrence Unaided English Medium School, Bondel
- Mahatma Gandhi Secondary High School, Bondel
- Govt Higher Primary School, Kavoor
- Govt Degree College, Gandhinagar, Kavoor
- EduKids Pre School, Kavoor
- Dr M.V Shetty Institutions, Vidya Nagar, Kavoor Road

== See also ==
- Bondel
- Kulur, Mangalore
- Kadri
- Bajpe
- Derebail
