= Bolar, Mangalore =

Bolara or Bolar is an inner city locality in Mangalore City, Karnataka, India.

The famous Mangaladevi Temple by which Mangalore derives its name and Halekote Sri Mariyamma - Mahishamardini Devasthana is located in Bolara (or Bolar as pronounced in English). Bolara is predominantly a residential area.

== Religious places ==
- Mangaladevi Temple
- Mariyamma Temple
- Kanti Church
- Mukhyaprana Temple (Lord Hanuman)
- Kallurti Sthana
- Dhoomavathi Temple
- Ullal Darga
- Saidina Bibi Darga
- Kajore Darga
- Shanoor Darga
- Khudrat Sha Waliulla Darga - Caste Street
- Jalal Mastan Darga Formed in 629

== Educational institutions ==
- Infant Jesus Joyland School
- Government Higher Primary School
- Urdu School
- Mission School (Kanti Church campus)
- Joyland High School
- Joyland Institute of Commerce
- Janatha Kendra

== Other notable places ==
- Ramakrishna Ashram: This is one of the ashrams set up by the Ramakrishna Mission started by Swami Vivekananda. It has a large campus with hostels for poor families who come to Mangalore for studies.
- Mulihithlu Nethravati River Bank : With a panoramic view of Ullala on the other side of the river and the railway bridge across the Nethravati river, this is a popular evening spot for locals.
- Tile factories: Only two of the former six roof tile factories remain. Others have closed due to losses or union related problems.
- Ice Factories: Many ice factories manufacture ice used for fishing boats.
- Bolar Sea Face:
