= Maryhill, Mangaluru =

Maryhill
- Residential locality
- Country: India
- State: Karnataka
- District: Dakshina Kannada
- City: Mangaluru

Government
  - Body: Mangaluru City Corporation

Languages
  - Official: Tulu, Kannada
- Time zone: UTC+5:30 (IST)
- PIN: 575008
- Telephone code: 0824
- Vehicle registration: KA 19
- Lok Sabha constituency: Mangalore
- Climate: Humid (Köppen)

Maryhill is a locality in Mangaluru city, Karnataka, India. It is one of the upscale residential localities of Mangaluru. Maryhill, along with Bondel houses many highrise buildings and is also developing rapidly as a commercial center. Tulu is the main language which is spoken and understood by everyone in this locality. Konkani, Kannada are the other languages that is commonly used. Maryhill is predominantly a residential area and famous for Helipad. Many people use the Helipad daily for morning and evening walk. There are around 10 to 15 youth who enthusiastically gather at Maryhill helipad every Sunday at 8 am to fly their radio controlled aircraft. Instructors in the group train their pupils to fly these aircraft and also to operate radio-controlled motor cars.

== Educational establishments in Maryhill ==
- Mount Carmel Central School
- Vikas Pre-University College, Mangaluru
- Infant Jesus Higher primary school
- Opa Schooling- Preschool ( Nursery, Playgroup)

== Sites of worship ==
- Maryhill Chapel – used by sisters of the Apostolic Carmel located exactly in Maryhill.
- Mahalasa Narayani Temple: This temple is located between Maryhill and Padavinangadi.
- Bandottu Kordabbu Daivastana: This is one of the local daivastana in the area. Kola ustav will be held every year in the month of January.

== See also ==
- Kadri, Mangalore
- Bejai
