= Xanthan ketal pyruvate transferase =

Identifiers
- EC no.: 2.5.1.95

Databases
- IntEnz: IntEnz view
- BRENDA: BRENDA entry
- ExPASy: NiceZyme view
- KEGG: KEGG entry
- MetaCyc: metabolic pathway
- PRIAM: profile
- PDB structures: RCSB PDB PDBe PDBsum
Search
- PMC: articles
- PubMed: articles
- NCBI: proteins

Xanthan ketal pyruvate transferase (EC 2.5.1.95, KPT) is an enzyme with systematic name phosphoenolpyruvate:D-Man-beta-(1->4)-GlcA-beta-(1->2)-D-Man-alpha-(1->3)-D-Glc-beta-(1->4)-D-Glc-alpha-1-diphospho-ditrans,octacis-undecaprenol 4,6-O-(1-carboxyethan-1,1-diyl)transferase. This enzyme catalyses the following chemical reaction

phosphoenolpyruvate + D-Man-beta-(1->4)-D-GlcA-beta-(1->2)-D-Man-alpha-(1->3)-D-Glc-beta-(1->4)-D-Glc-alpha-1-diphospho-ditrans,octacis-undecaprenol $\rightleftharpoons$ 4,6-CH3(COO-)C-D-Man-beta-(1->4)-D-GlcA-beta-(1->2)-D-Man-alpha-(1->3)-D-Glc-beta-(1->4)-D-Glc-alpha-1-diphospho-ditrans,octacis-undecaprenol + phosphate

This enzyme is involved in the biosynthesis of the polysaccharide xanthan.
