= Manjanady =

Manjanady, Ullal
- village
- Location in Karnataka, India Manjanady, Ullal (India)
- Coordinates: 12.7846°N 74.8854°E
- Country: India
- State: Karnataka
- District: Dakshina Kannada
- Taluk: Mangalore

Government
  - Type: Panchayati raj (India)
  - Body: Gram panchayat

Population (2001)
  - Total: 8,283

Languages
  - Official: Kannada, Tulu
- Time zone: UTC+5:30 (IST)
- ISO 3166 code: IN-KA
- Vehicle registration: KA 19
- Website: karnataka.gov.in

Manjanady is a village in the Indian state of Karnataka, India. It is located in the Mangalore taluk of Dakshina Kannada district in Karnataka.

== Demographics ==
As of 2001 census of India, Manjanady had a population of 10,435 with 5245 males and 5190 females. Manjanady is a large village located near Mangalore University in the district of Mangalore (Dakshin Kannada) state of Karnataka, India. It has a population of about 10,435 or more persons living in around 1,695 households near to SEZ.

== See also ==
- Dakshina Kannada
- Districts of Karnataka
