= Mariyamma Temple =

Religion
- Affiliation: Hinduism
- District: Dakshin Kannada
- Festivals: Rathotsva, Maha Shivaratri

Location
- Location: Urwa, Mangalore, Karnataka
- State: Karnataka
- Country: India
- Interactive map of Mariyamma Temple
- Coordinates: 12.876119°N 74.831554°E

The Mariyamma Temple is situated in Boloor, India, dedicated to Goddess Mariyamma, situated approximately 5 km from Mangaladevi Temple in Mangalore city, Karnataka, India. It is believed that Mariyamma and Mangaladevi were sisters. Dasara is the important festival celebrated there and also in 14 January chandika yaga, vishesha hoovina pooje and in April last week Rashipooje are celebrated grandly.

== Background ==
Mariyamma temple is about 5 km from Mangaladevi Temple in Mangalore city. The main deity of this temple is Goddess Mariyamma. This temple was built by the Mogaveera community around 800 years ago for the dedicated Goddess Mariyamma. It is believed that Mariyamma and Mangaladevi were sisters. Mariyamma is also referred to as the goddess of wealth. Annual Maari puja and Dasara are the important festival celebrated there.

In Urwa in the precincts of Mangalore, legend has it that the Goddess appeared in the dreams of one of the Mogaveera staying in Urwa and asked for a residing place in the vicinity and so a temple was built for the deity, The Mogaveeras have a unique way of thanks giving for this goddess. They make gold ornaments in the form of different variety of fish and the deity if adorned with it, it is one of the oldest and the best known temples in the district; it is the favorite goddess of the Mogaveeras. The gold pendants and necklaces they collectively offer are in the shape of fishes such as "bangude sara" (mackerel necklace), "bhutayi sara" (sardine), "seegadi sara" (prawn) and "maanji sara" (pomfret).

== History ==
The history of Goddess Shree Mariyamma can be traced back to nearly about 800 years. As per ancient folklore and the sayings of ancestors, a person from the 'chulli Gurikara' family, living in the Mogaveeras village of ancient Karnataka, had gone to the ghat area on business visit. While returning home, he felt that some divine power is following him and he also felt as if his body started to shake and shiver as if in a trance known as 'Avesha' meaning Goddess entering a human body and speaking through him. He later felt as if God said to him to take her along him to the place where he resides. He then reached Urwa and decided to build a temple to this Goddess.

Knowing this all the villagers held a meeting and consequently all the members of the seven pattanas of the mogaveeraSamaj held a meeting from Kudroli to Hosabettu. As per the decision taken by all, the Gram Patela (village head) of Boloor was made their head and he narrated the proceedings of the meeting and he also suggested a suitable place for construction of temple for the Devi. It was a vacant plot of land. In those days the Kumbaras used to perform poojas to Lord Eshwara (Shiva) in the nearby katte or gudi (monuments). And thus villagers of Mogaveera Pattanas installed the idol of Goddess Shree Maaridevi and started worshipping the Devi in the adjacent plot next to Eshwara Gudi.

Despite their poverty, all the fishermen parted with one share of their income for the development of the Devi Temple. From then onwards, it became a custom to collect vanthige (monetary offerings) from the villagers of the pattanas. As proof of their devotion, their money was then utilized to decorate the Goddess with different varieties of gold coins on her neck. All the women, children without any age bar, co-operated in the construction of the Mariyamma Temple, by joining hands in this noble cause. They even carried bricks, stones and other building materials on their heads and walked all the way for one and half km from Boloor.

From the time immemorial, whenever they faced a scarcity of fishes in the sea or any crisis, all the villagers of the seven paraganas meet at Yogettu and prayed to the Devi for a whole day, and miraculously the very next day they would get a bumper crop of fishes in the seas. To support this belief, they have a lot of evidence too. For instance whenever the sea became wild and rough and they could not venture into it for fishing, they would pray to Goddess Maariyamma and miraculously she would bless her devotees and the tidal waves would recede back into the sea and calm down the waters. Even during heavy rains lashing the seas, the fishermen without caring for their lives would jump into the seas with the belief that Goddess Maariamma would protect them by not allowing any accident to occur and thereby protecting the entire Mogaveera Samaja.

Hence from the ancient times to this day, the Mogaveera Samaja has sacrificed everything at the feet of Goddess Maariyamma. As proof of this Sridevi Maariyamma has ordered the "chulli" family to participate and perform all the religious ceremonies and rituals of the temple even when they have any "Sutakas" (bad omens). All the religious ceremonies even today are being conducted by the Mogaveeras of the seven pattanas in sequence one after the other, annually.

== Annual celebration ==
Every year during early March Mari Pooja is held with display. People gather from all nearby towns in Mangalore. Special Pooja takes place for three days. Preparation for the celebration of Mari Pooja starts almost from 1 week. This day the goddess will be decorated with kilograms of gold.

Just as every village has a Shiva temple, it is observed that each village will have a Marigudi temple. Marigudi temple present at Urwa has its influence on five neighboring villages. Various pujas like Madastana, Kanchi Harake from children, Darshana Bali are performed during the annual Mari Puja festival.

The auspicious nine-night festival celebrated at Marigudi temple. Various pujas are offered during these days. All the devotees are served with afternoon Annadana Prasada.

== Connectivity ==
By Road - It takes 6 minutes to travel from Urwa, where the temple is located to the Mangalore city. Approximate driving distance between Urwa and Mangalore is 5 Kilometers.

By Trains - The major railway station nearest to the temple is Mangalore Railway Station.

By Flights - The nearest airport to the temple is Mangalore International Airport, Mangalore.
