= Urwa, India =

Urwa
- Locality
- Location in Mangalore city, Karnataka, India
- Coordinates: 12.869121231152081°N 74.82127030380821°E

Urwa is a residential locality in the city of Mangalore, in the state of Karnataka in India.

Urwa is famous for the Mariyamma Temple, which is popularly known as Urwa Marigudi, and also several renowned educational institutions.

== Religious Places ==
- Shri Mariyamma Temple :which has a got a history of 700 years, popularly known has urwa marigudi, where lakhs of people visit during annual festival
- Immaculate Conception Church, consecrated in 1865, celebrated 150 years on 1 May 2015

== Educational institutions ==
- St Aloysius Higher Primary School, Urwa
- Canara High School, Urwa
- Karavali College of Nursing
- SCS College of Nursing
- Ladyhill English Higher Primary School
- Vikas College of Physiotherapy
