= Mount Carmel Central School =

Location
- Mangaluru, Karnataka; India; 12.858626°N 74.841395°E

Information
- Type: CBSE
- Motto: Higher and Nobler
- Patron saint: Our Lady of Mount Carmel

Mount Carmel Central School is a CBSE affiliated school, situated at Maryhill in Mangaluru city of Karnataka in India.

== Facilities and amenities ==
The facilities and amenities provided by this school are

- Physics Lab
- Chemistry Lab
- Biology Lab
- Counselling
- Sports Facilities
- Scouts and Guides
- Karate classes
- Music classes
- Drawing classes
- Arts/craft classes
- 3D printer and maths Lab
- Dancing classes
