= Kuloor =

- village
- Location in Kerala, India Kuloor (India)
- Coordinates: 12°40′0″N 74°56′0″E
- Country: India
- State: Kerala
- District: Kasaragod
- Talukas: Kasaragod

Languages
  - Official: Tulu Language
- Time zone: UTC+5:30 (IST)
- PIN: 671 323
- Vehicle registration: KL- 14

Kuloor (historical name) is a village in Kasaragod district in the state of Kerala, India. The name Kuloor originates from the Tulu language, meaning kul (paddy agriculture) oor (village).

== Transportation ==
Local roads have access to National Highway No.66 which connects to Mangalore in the north and Calicut in the south. The nearest railway station is Manjeshwar on Mangalore-Palakkad line. There is an airport at Mangalore. kerala state built new road from kuloor to uppala in 2026.

== Languages ==
1) Tulu

2) Malayalam

3) Konkani

4) Urdu

5) Kannada

== Small areas in Kuloor ==
1) Santhadka

2) Manoor

3) Chinala

4) Eliyana

5) Karippar

6) Shanthinagara

7) Charla

8) Poyyel

== Devotional places ==
1) Sri Karmbade Doomavathi Deiva Sthana

[[

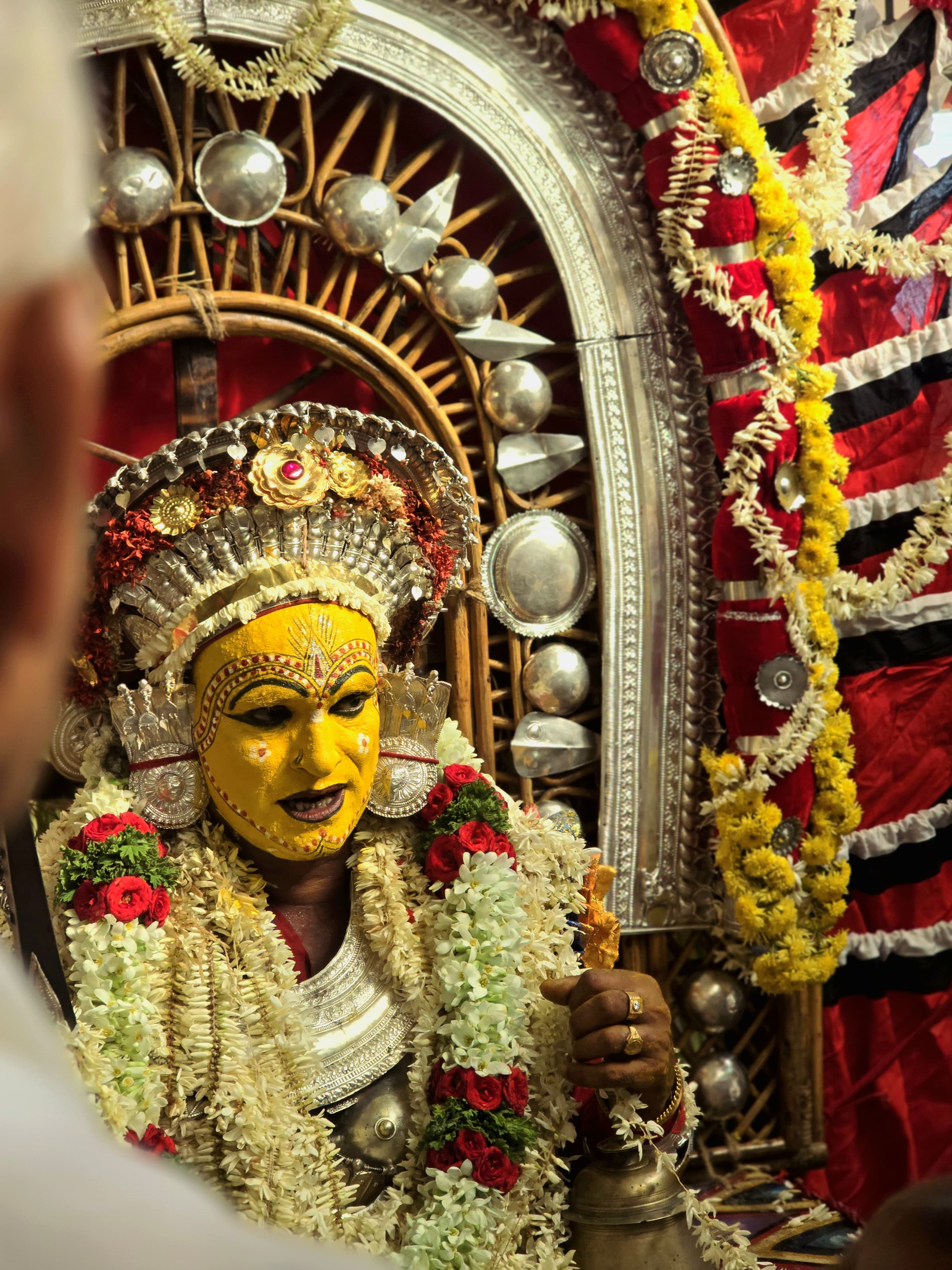
Kuloor karmade jumadi

|thumb|KARMBADE DHOOMAVATHI IN KULOOR]]

2) Sri Arasu Sankala Deiva kshethra Santhadka

3) Charla Masjid

4) Chinala Juma Masjid

5) Chinala Sri Shastha Ayyappa Bhajana Mandira

6) Sri Adhishakthi Gopalakrishna Kshethra Sunnara Beedu

7) Sri Guliga koragathaniya Deiva Sannidhi Shanthinagara

== Administration ==
This village is part of Meenja Grama Panchayath which is again part of Manjeswaram assembly constituency which is again part of Kasaragod (Lok Sabha constituency)
