= Pavoor Uliya =

Island in Mangalore, India

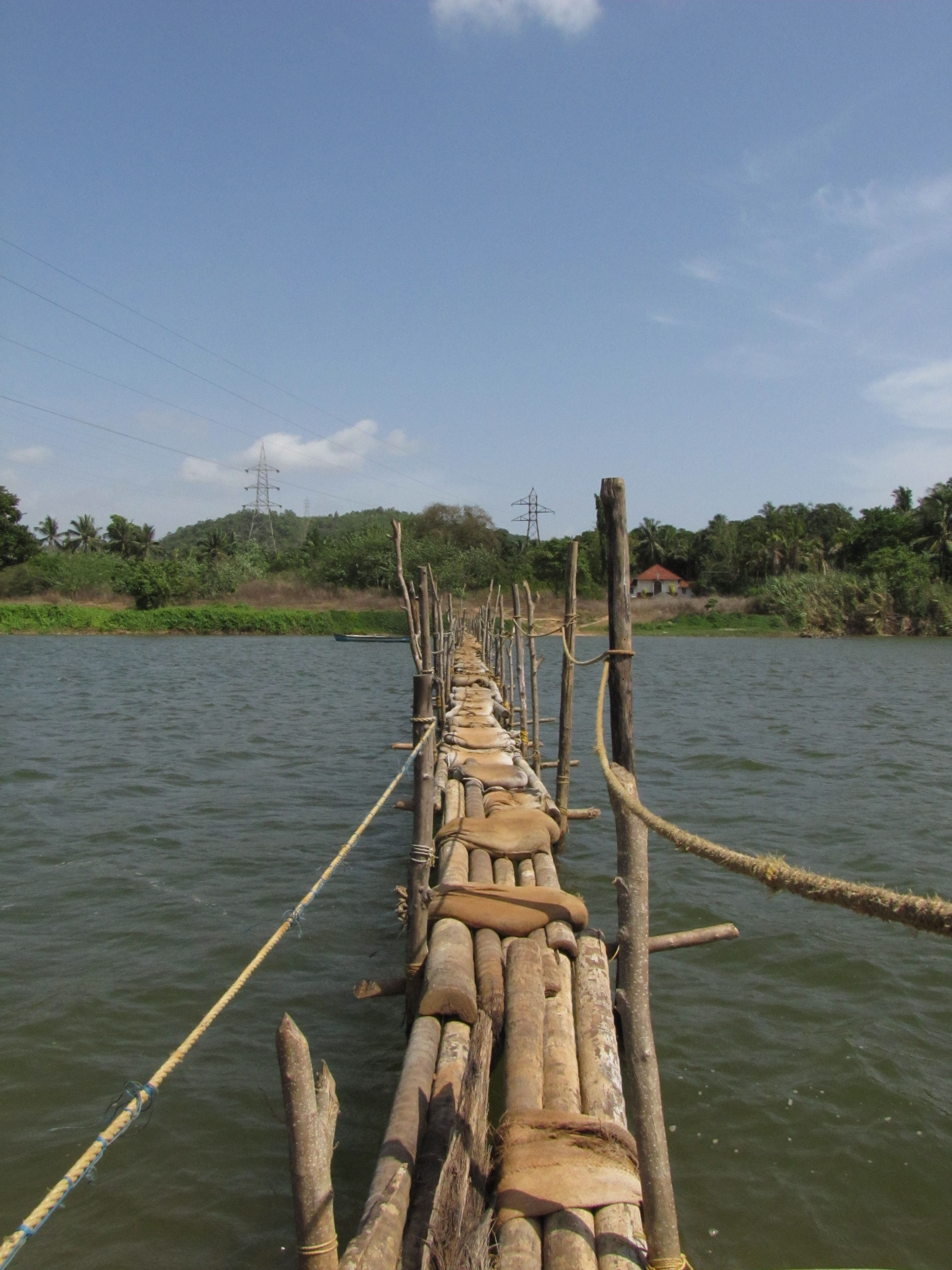
Pavoor Uliya Bridge

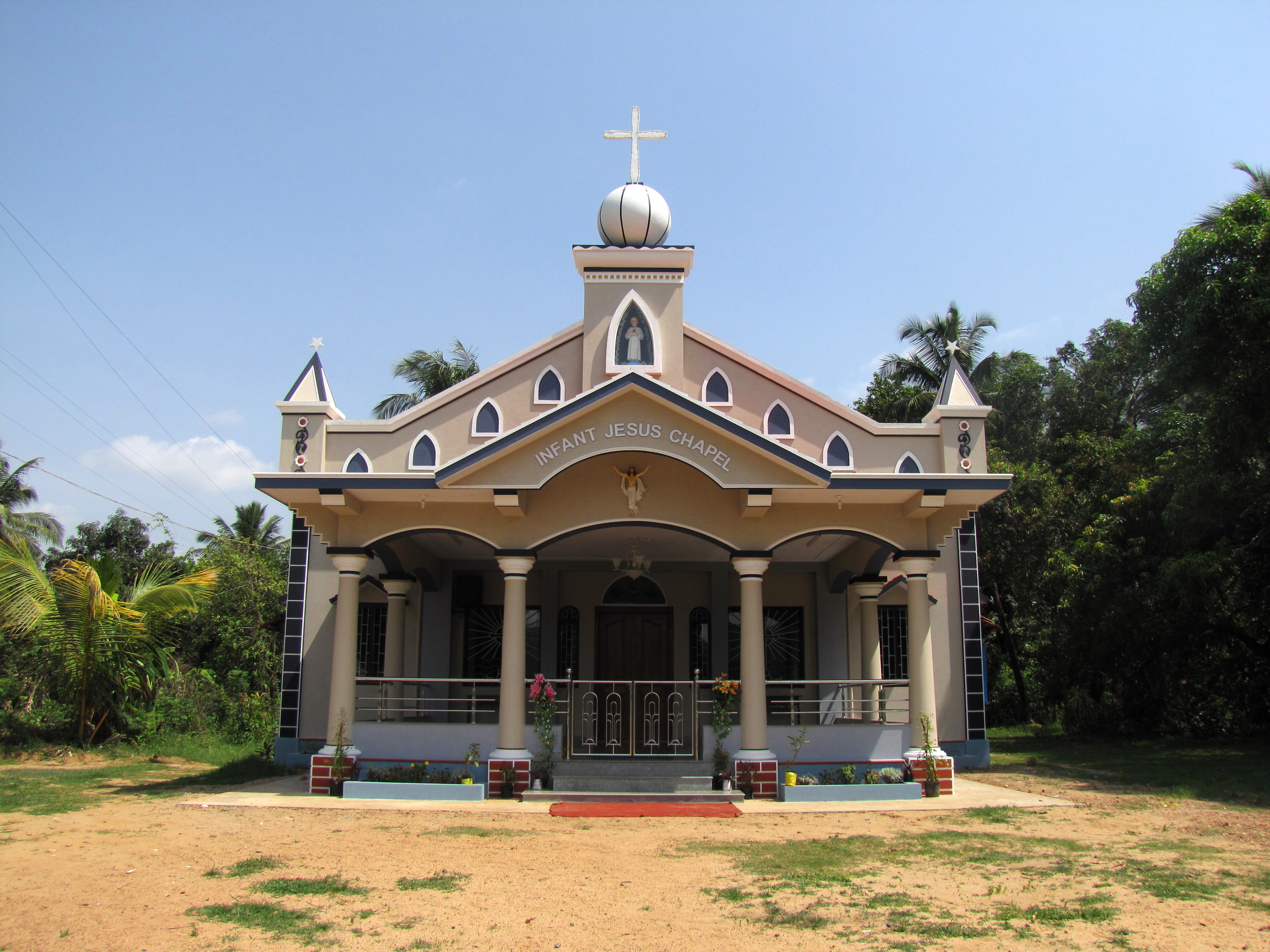
Pavoor Uliya

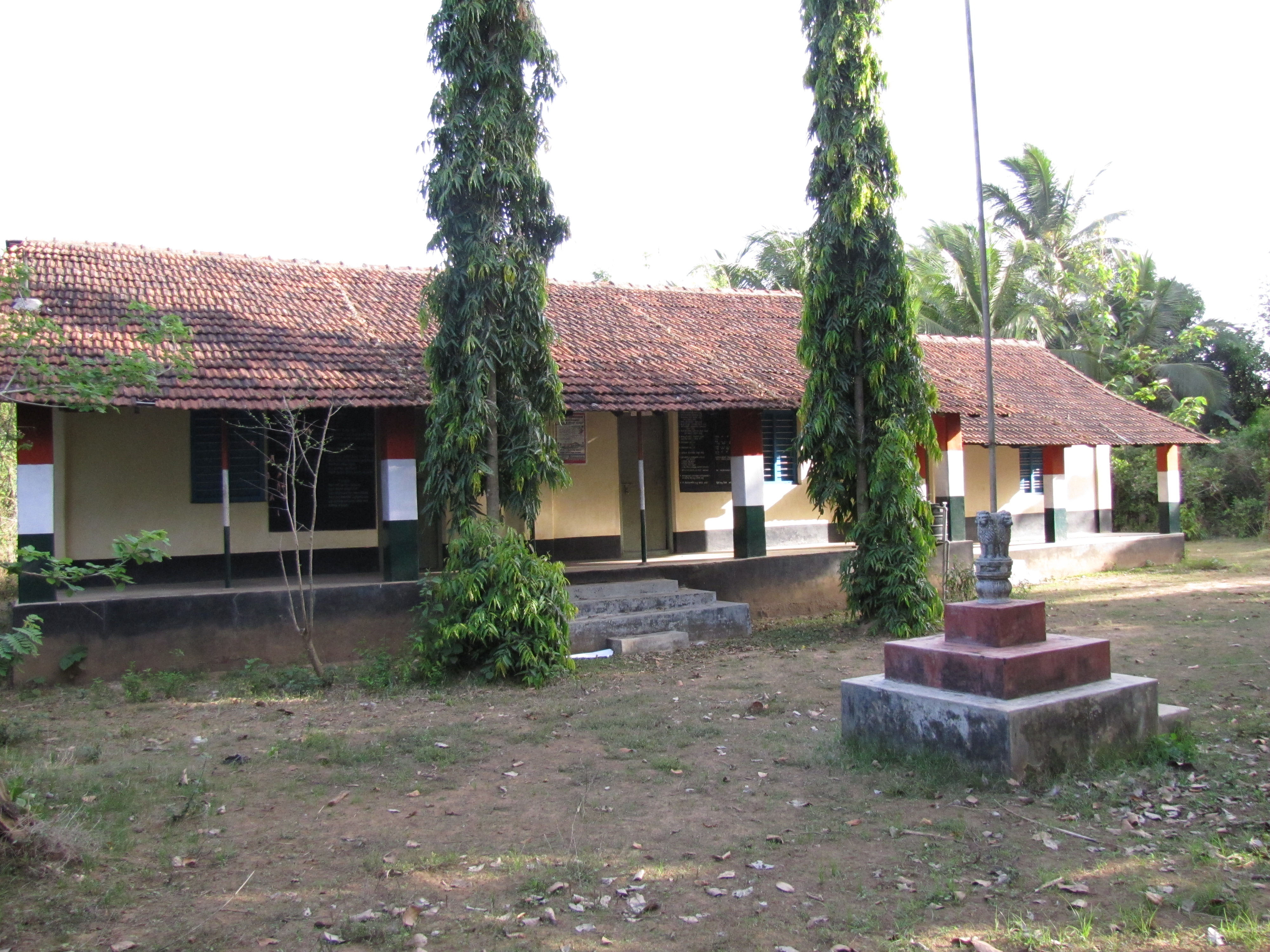
School in Pavoor Uliya

Pavoor Uliya is an island on the Netravathi River and located 12 km from Mangalore with 35 houses, a chapel and a former government school. It was adopted by Dakshina Kannada Zilla in May 2017 in order to improve development. During summer, a temporary wooden bridge connects the island to the river bank. In the rainy season, a passenger ferry takes Pilates to and from the island. There are no street lights, shops or medical facilities on the island.

== Etymology ==
Uliya means "leftover or remaining land". The geography resembles a jagged oval shape. Most of the families here are Roman Catholic, except for one Hindu family. The native language is Konkani. Capuchin priests from Farangipet come here to celebrate Eucharistic Mass every Sunday. The chapel's name is Infant Jesus Chapel. Every year during Christmas youth and children organize a cultural program.

== Economy ==
The basic sources of living are fishing and agriculture. Coconut trees and other fruit trees such as mango and jackfruit are grown on the island.

Currently, the sand mining has caused huge damage to the island. There evaluation of the damage caused due to mining activities.

== Development ==
On Tuesday, 29 July 2014, the Minister for health and family welfare, U.T. Khadar of Karnataka, said the Karnataka state government, acting on the longstanding demands of the people of Pavoor-Uliya, has sanctioned the construction of a hanging bridge across the Netravati River, connecting the island to the mainland. A sum of Rs 3 crores has already been released for this purpose.
