= U S Mallya Indoor Stadium =

Sports venue in Mangaluru, India

- Location at Mangaluru
- Location: Mangaluru
- Coordinates: 12°51′58″N 74°50′12″E
- Owner: Mangaluru City Corporation
- Capacity: 1,500

Construction
- Opened: 2004

U S Mallya Indoor Stadium is situated at Mangaluru in India. It offers sporting facilities for Badminton and Basketball. The stadium is named after U. Srinivas Mallya.

== Events ==
- This stadium had hosted the All India Badminton Tournament in 2019.
