= Reserve Bank =

A reserve bank is a public institution that manages a state's currency, money supply, and interest rates.

Reserve Bank may also refer to:

- Reserve Bank of Australia
- Reserve Bank of Fiji
- Reserve Bank of India
- Reserve Bank of New Zealand
- South African Reserve Bank
- Federal Reserve System of the United States
- Reserve Bank of Vanuatu
- Reserve Bank of Vietnam
- Reserve Bank of Zimbabwe

== See also ==
- National bank (disambiguation)
- List of central banks
- Central bank
