= Katipalla =

- town
- Country: India
- State: Karnataka
- District: Dakshina Kannada

Languages
  - Official: Kannada
- Time zone: UTC+5:30 (IST)
- PIN: 575 030
- Telephone code: 91-824
- Nearest city: Surathkal 5Km away
- Literacy: 75%
- Lok Sabha constituency: Dakshina Kannada
- Avg. summer temperature: 35 °C (95 °F)
- Avg. winter temperature: 18 °C (64 °F)

Katipalla is a small town, five km from Surathkal in the Dakshina Kannada district of Karnataka state, India. Residents primarily speak Tulu, while Muslims in Katipalla often speak Byari.

== Overview ==
Many residents of this place were rehabilitated from Panambur, after the New Mangalore Port Trust (NMPT). "Katipalla" in local Tulu language literally means wild stream. 'Kati' means wild, 'palla' means stream. A stream originates from this place and flows downtoward towards the Krishnapura Matha and further down joining other streams. Before rehabilitation during the 1970s, the area was covered with forest infested with wild animals like tiger, hyena, fox etc. Perhaps name of this place may have derived because the wild animals used this water stream to quench their thirst. Here the population is mixed with three main religions Hindu, Muslim, & Christians.

Furthermore, Krishnapura Matha is one of Ashta Mathas of Udupi founded by Dvaita philosopher Sri Madhvacharya. Some of the area (blocks) of Katipalla are even today known as Krishnapura, especially those near to Krishnapura matha. The Krishnapura Matha has a Mukhyaprana (Maruti or Hanuman) temple inside. The structure of the Matha is supported by wood pillars. The Matha has exquisite wooden carving. The Mangalore petroleum refinery (MRPL) and BASF plant are also nearby.
