= Harekala =

- village
- Location in Karnataka, India Harekala (India)
- Coordinates: 12.87°N 74.84°E
- Country: India
- State: Karnataka
- District: Dakshina Kannada
- Talukas: Mangalore

Government
  - Body: Gram panchayat

Population (2001)
  - Total: 6,207

Languages
  - Official: Kannada
- Time zone: UTC+5:30 (IST)
- ISO 3166 code: IN-KA
- Vehicle registration: KA
- Website: karnataka.gov.in

Harekala is a village in the southern state of Karnataka, India. It is located in the Mangalore taluk of Dakshina Kannada district.

== Demographics ==
As of 2001 India census, Harekala had a population of 6,207 with 3,045 males and 3,162 females.

== Geography ==
Harekala is on the south side of the Netravati River, opposite Adyar. It is connected to the north bank by the 520m Harekala-Adyar dam and road bridge since it was completed in April 2023.

== See also ==
- Mangalore
- Dakshina Kannada
- Districts of Karnataka
