= Statebank, Mangalore =

Statebank, Mangalore is a locality in Mangaluru which is also the heart of Mangaluru.

The 1907 Mangaluru town map shows "Madras Bank" at the same location as StateBank, while the bus stand seems to be erstwhile Basel Mission shops.

In simple words State Bank is what Majestic area is to Bengaluru. Mangaluru's city bus station is also situated in State Bank. Almost all the city buses in Mangaluru have State Bank as the destination location, which is why it is common for one to see "State Bank" written in bus route display of most of the private and KSRTC buses.

This place would have inherited this name as the main branch of State Bank of India of Mangaluru region is located at Old Port Road.

== Bus stand ==
Private buses leaving from State Bank Bus Stand

State bank has city bus stand, Service bus stand

State Bank bus stand
Platform no	Route	Destination	Frequency
1A	Agumbe (express)	Thirthahalli Shimoga	15 mins
1B	Udupi (express)	Kundapur Kollur Manipal Hebri	1 min
2A	Surathkal	Mulki Padubidri Kinnigoli	5mins
2B	Kateel	Kinnigoli Mulki Belman	10 mins
3A	Mulki (express)	Karkala Sringeri Koppa	10 mins
3B	Kaikamba	Kinnigoli Moodabidre Polali	5 mins
4A	Moodabidre (express)	Karkala Sringeri Naravi	10 mins
4B	Neermarga	BCroad FarangiPete	15 mins
5A	BC Road(express)	Belthangady Uppinangady Vittal	20 mins
5B	BC Road(express)	Puttur Sullia	20 mins
6A	Mudipu	Inoli BCroad Vittal	5 mins
6B	Talapadi	Kanyana UppalaKasaragod	10 mins
7A	Carstreet Ladyhill	Urwastore Shediguri	1min
7B	Carstreet Ladyhill	Urwastore Kunjathabail	1min
8A	Lalbag KSRTC	Kunjathabail Bondel	1min
8B	Mallikatte Nanthoor	Shaktinagar Neermarga	1min
9A	Kankanadi Padil	Bajal Adyar	1min
9B	Bolara Kankanadi	Bajal Kumpala	5 min
10A	Kulur Surathkal	Katipalla Jokkkatte	1 min
10B	Kavoor Kaikamba	Bajpe Polali	5 mins
11A	Thokkottu Ullala	Talapadi Someshwara	1 min
11B	Kuttar Konaje	Pavoor Inoli	1 min

== Fish Market ==
Busy fresh fish and dry fish Market operated by Mogaveera community
