= Talapady, D.K. =

Talapady
- Village
- Interactive map of Talapady
- Coordinates: 12.764°N 74.88°E
- Country: India
- State: Karnataka
- District: Dakshina Kannada
- Taluk: Mangalore

Government
  - Body: Gram panchayat

Population (2001)
  - Total: 7,742

Languages
  - Official: Kannada, English
- Time zone: UTC+5:30 (IST)
- Postal code: 575023
- ISO 3166 code: IN-KA
- Vehicle registration: KA 19
- Website: karnataka.gov.in

Talapady is a village near Mangaluru city in Ullal taluk of Dakshina Kannada district of Karnataka state in India. Talapady borders the states of Karnataka and Kerala. National Highway 66 (earlier numbered as NH-17) passes through Talapady which is 14 km (9 mi) south of Mangalore city. The Karnataka-Kerala checkpost border is situated at Talapady. Another village Thalapady, Kasargod which is situated near Talapady in Manjeswar crossing Kerala border.

== General information ==
The place Talapady is a village near Mangalore city of Dakshina Kannada district and borders Kerala and Karnataka. Postal Index Number code (Pincode) of Talapady is 575023. Shri Durga Parameshwari temple located at Devipura in revenue village of Kinnya is near by. There is road to east of Talapady from National Highway 66( formerly NH-17) going to Shree Durga temple at Devipura. Shri Durga Parameshvari Temple at Devipura, Talapadi is family deity to Bhargava gotra of Shivalli Madhwa Brahmana's.

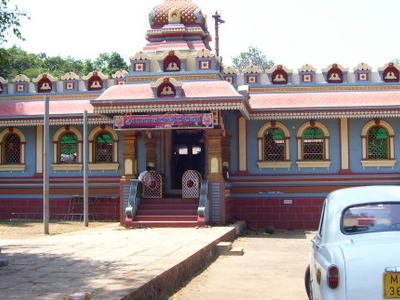
Talapady Durga Temple

Badriya Juma Masjid in Talapady is the resting place of Bapakutti Musliyar who was the renowned writer in Beary. He was working as ustad at this mosque for many years.This place is famous for Beaches, Guest house, Sports, Cultural activities and has all the modern facilities.

== Transportation ==
Talapady is connected by city buses operating from State Bank(Mangalore city), frequency being in every 5 minutes. From Mangalore city to Talapady it's around 14 km, and 8 km from Uppala and 34 km from Kasaragod city. The route numbers of the buses from Mangalore to Talapady are 42 and 43 and some of the express buses going from Mangalore to Kasaragod do stop at Talapady highway junction. The nearest airport is Mangalore International Airport distance drive of 22 km and the nearest seaport is New Mangalore Port at Panamburu.
