= Karnataka (Govt.) Polytechnic =

Karnataka Polytechnic college
- Motto in English: Labour Is Dignity
- Established: 1946
- Affiliations: Department of Collegiate & Technical Education Bangalore, AICTE New Delhi
- Location: Mangaluru, Karnataka, India
- Campus: 22 acres
- Website: Official website

Karnataka (Govt.) Polytechnic also known as K.P.T., is a polytechnic university in Mangaluru, Karnataka state, India.

== History ==
It was established in 1946 in a rented building in Pandeshwar under the Government of Madras State. Since 1954, Polytechnic has started functioning at its present campus in Kadri Hills, Mangalore. There were four main three-year diploma programmes in civil engineering, mechanical engineering, electrical engineering, and automobile engineering at the time of starting. Later, the current courses were supplemented with the diploma programmes in Chemical Engineering, Polymer Technology, Electronics and Communication, and Computer Science. The polytechnic's campus spans 19 acres in total. The institute benefits the public by providing engineering education. This Polytechnic College is one of the oldest technical colleges in this region. Institute are running 3-year of eight Diploma courses.

== Courses ==
=== Diploma Courses ===
- Computer science and Engineering
- Electrical and Electronics Engineering
- Mechanical Engineering
- Electronics and Communication Engineering
- Automobile Engineering
- Civil Engineering
- Chemical Engineering
- Polymer Technology

== Admission ==
Admission on the institute is based on SSLC result. is established by Department of Technical Education Karnataka, in the month of May–June every Year.

== CCTEK ==
CCTEK provide a training for interested external peoples in,

- Computer Training programme
- Technical Training
- Other Trainings (Karate, Fine arts, Driving classes 2/4 Men/Ladies)
- Special Training for ladies (Fashion designing, Garment making, Cutting and stitching, Machine embroi3, Craft training, Herbal beautician)
