= Mangaladevi Temple =

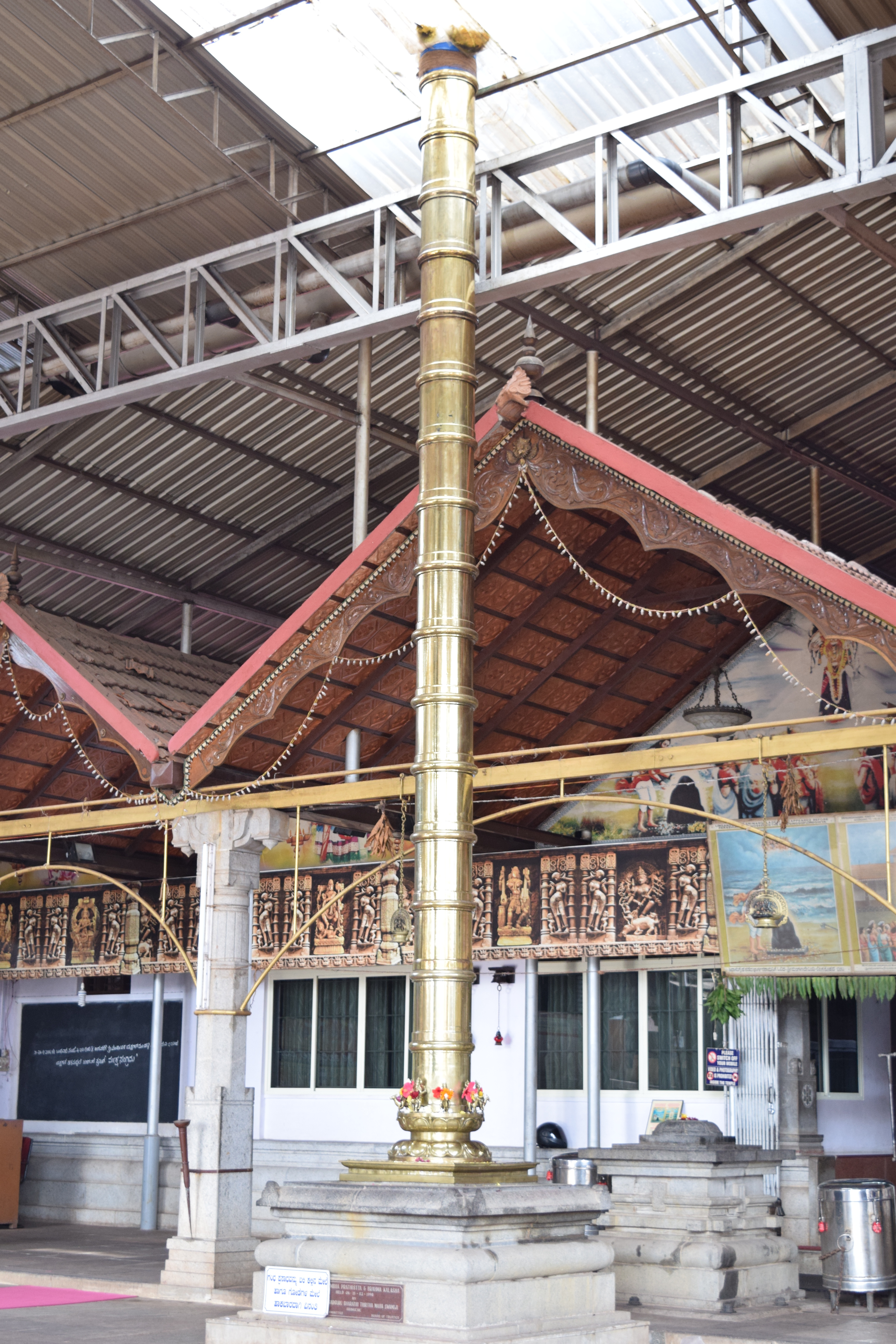
- The flag pole of Mangaladevi temple

- Location in Karnataka

Religion
- Affiliation: Hinduism
- District: Dakshina Kannada
- Deity: Mangaladevi
- Festival: Dasara

Location
- Location: Bolar, Mangalore
- State: Karnataka
- Country: India
- Coordinates: 12.8491°N 74.8432°E

Architecture
- Type: Kerala architecture
- Completed: 9th Century AD

Website
- mangaladevitemple.com

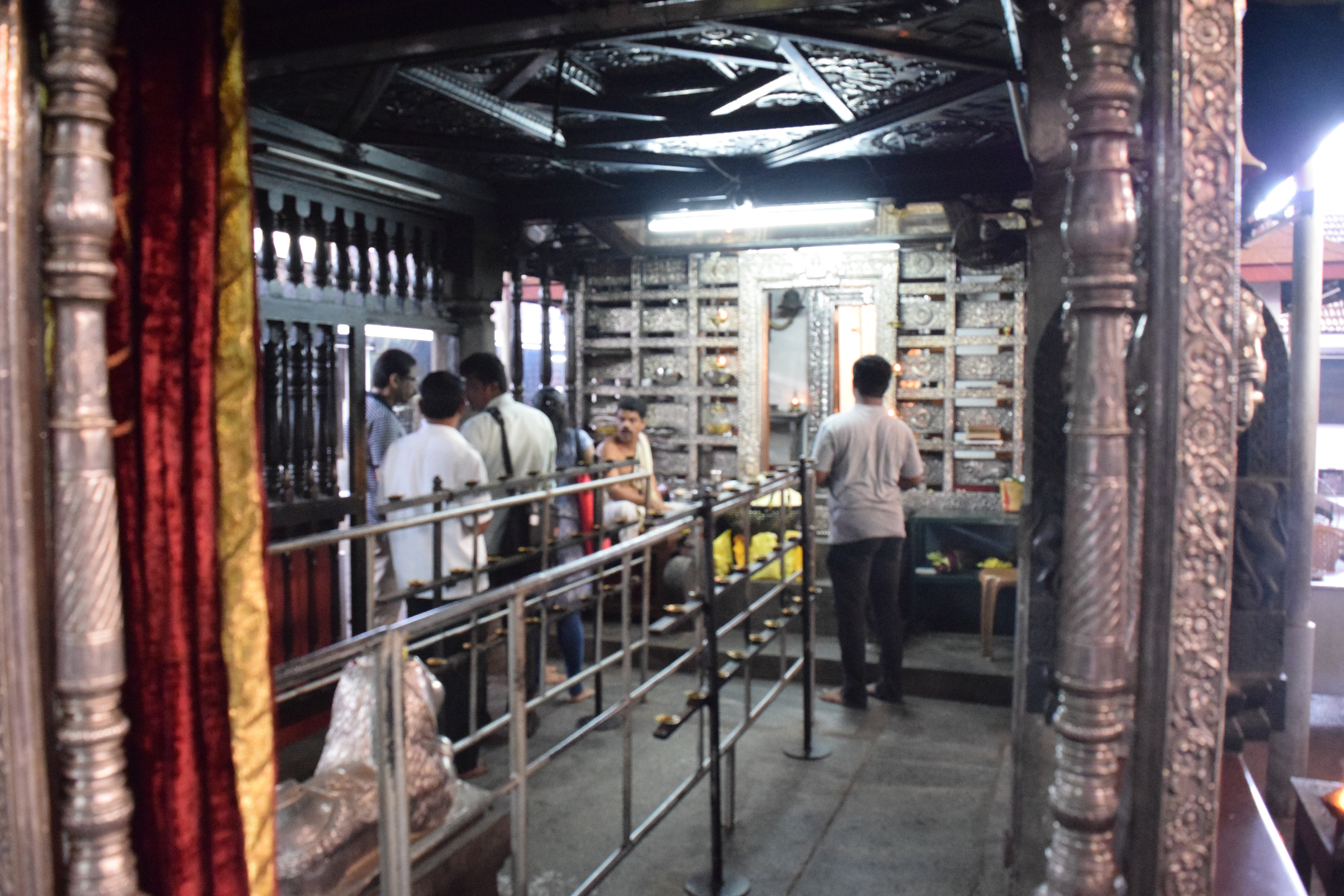
Mangaladevi Temple Inside view

The Mangaladevi Temple is a Hindu temple at Bolara in the city of Mangaluru in the Indian state of Karnataka. It is situated about three kilometres southwest of the city centre. The temple is dedicated to the Hindu goddess Shakti in the form of Mangaladevi, the presiding deity from whom the city derives its name.

The temple is of significant antiquity and is believed to have been built during the 9th century by Kundavarman, the most noted king of the Alupa dynasty, under the patronage of Matsyendranath. As per another legend, the temple is believed to have been built by Parashurama, one of the ten avatars of Hindu god Vishnu and later expanded by Kundavarman.

The presiding deity, Mangaladevi in the central shrine is in a seated posture. There are shrines around the sanctum for other deities.

In modern times, the temple is maintained and administered by trustees. The temple is open daily from 6 a.m. to 1 pm and 4 pm to 8:30 pm.

== Etymology ==
Mangaluru was named after the Hindu deity Mangaladevi, the presiding deity of the temple According to local legend, a princess from Malabar named Parimala or Premaladevi renounced her kingdom and became a disciple of Matsyendranath, the founder of the Nath tradition. Having converted Premaladevi to the Nath sect, Matsyendranath renamed her Mangaladevi. The city got its name from the temple.

== Legend ==
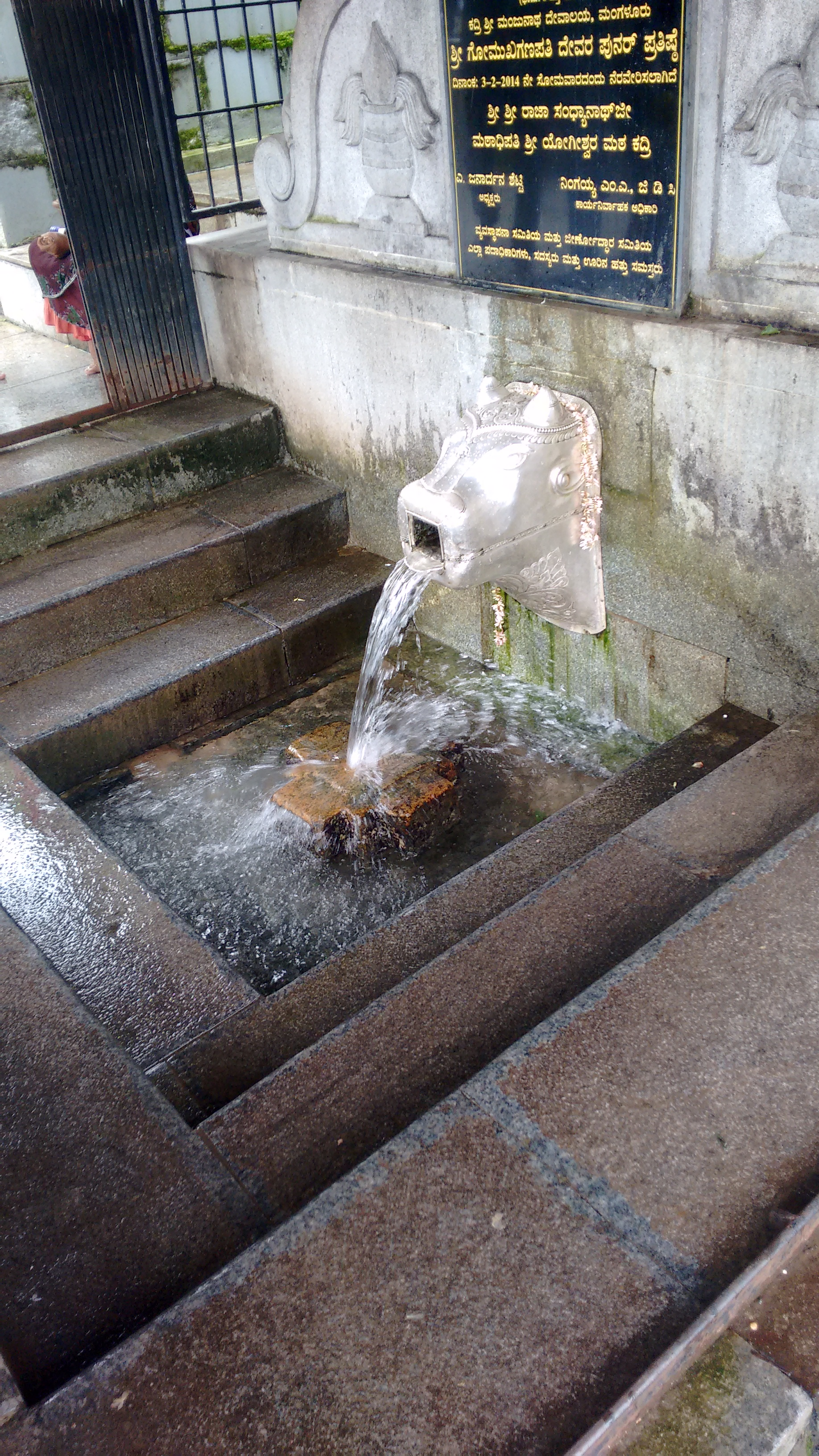
Image of Gomukai, the water spout from the sanctum at Kadri temple

The temple dates back to the ninth century when Kundavarman, the most famous king of the Alupa dynasty, was ruling Tulu Nadu. During this period, there were two holy saints of the Nath cult, Machindranath and Gorakhnath, who came from Nepal. They reached Mangaluru, crossing the river Nethravathi. The place where they crossed the river came to be known as Gorakdandi. They chose a place near the banks of the Netravathi which was once the centre of activities of the sage Kapila. The ruling king met the two saints. Pleased with the humility and virtues of the king, they informed him that his kingdom needed to be sanctified with a temple for Mangaladevi. From their own mother he heard the story of Vihasini and Andasura, Parashurama and the temple built by them. The two saints took the king to the sites where all these historical events had taken place. They asked the king to dig the place and relieve the lingam and the dharapatra symbolising Mangaladevi and install them in a shrine along with Nagaraja for providing protection. Kundavarman built grand shrine to Mangaladevi was built on the hallowed place with the guidance of the sages. Even today the two temples of Mangaladevi and Kadri, Mangalore have maintained their connection. The hermits of Kadri Yogirajmutt visit Mangaladevi temple on the first days of Kadri temple festival and offer prayer and silk clothes.

As per another legend, the temple is believed to have been built by Parashurama, one of the ten avatars of Hindu god Vishnu. During the passage of time, the temple was covered by vegetation and was restored by Kundavarma of Alupa dynasty during the 9th century. There are also views that the temple was built by Ballal family of Attavar to commemorate a Malabar Princess.

== The Temple ==
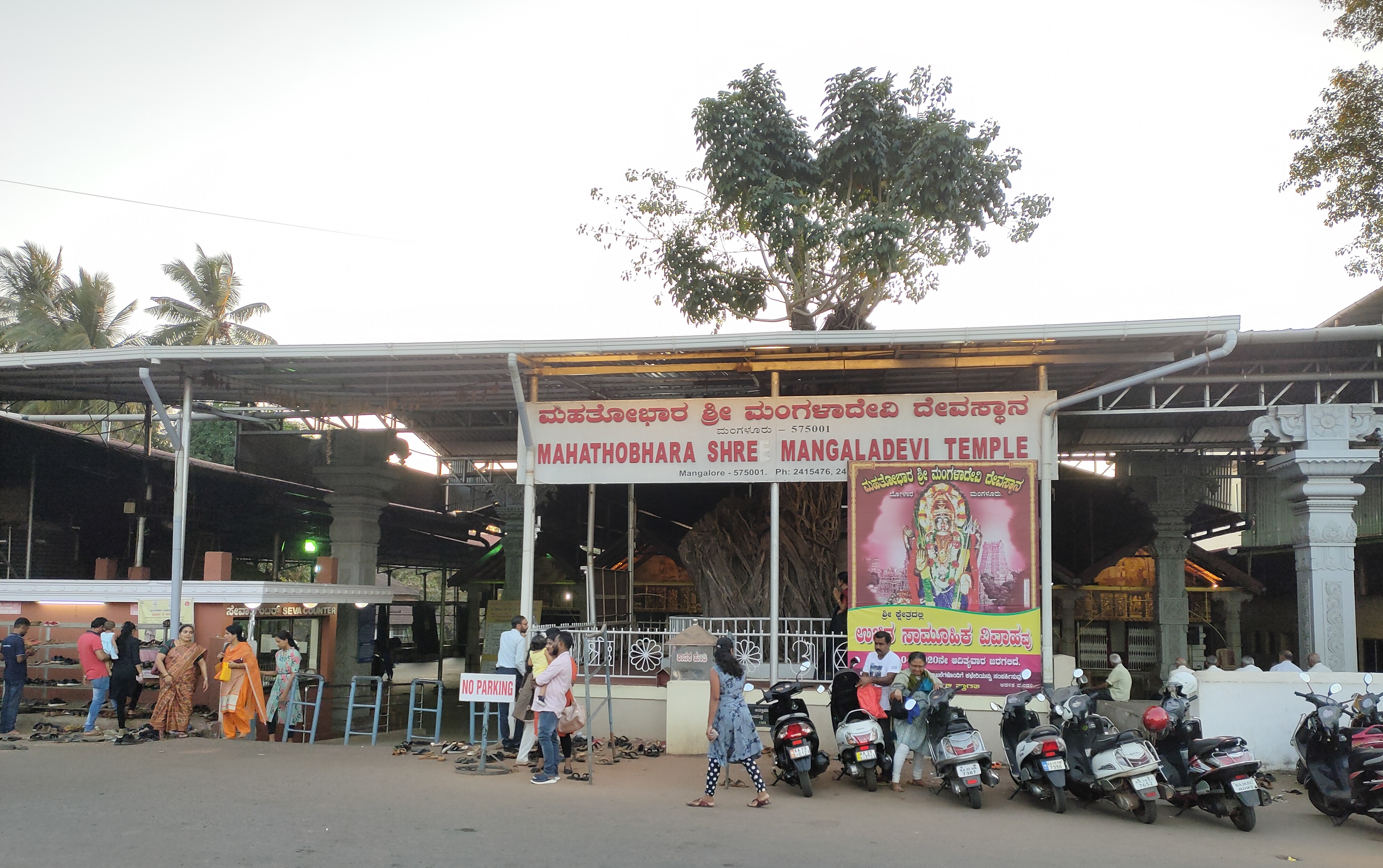
Mangaladevi Temple entrance

The temple is built in Kerala style architecture, which is common in all temples in the South Indian state of Kerala and Western Ghat. The temple has a two storeyed gopura or a gateway tower, with the upper storey having wooden trails covering the Kottupura (a hall of drum beating during festivals). A rectangular wall around the temple, called Kshetra-Madilluka pierced by the gateways, encloses all the shrines of the temple. The metal plated flagpost or Dwajasthamba is located axial to the temple tower leading to the central sanctum. The central shrine called Garbhagudi houses the image of the presiding deity. It is on an elevated platform with a single door reached through a flight of five steps. Either sides of the doors have images of guardian deities called Dvarapalakas.

The central shrine has a circular plan with the base built of granite, superstructure built of laterite and conical roof made of terrocata tile supported from inside by a wooden structure. The central shrine is at a lower elevation, with a shrine of Nagar, the snake god, in the elevation. Mangaladevi is depicted in sitting posture as Dharapatra. There is a small Linga to the left of the icon. In modern times, the temple is maintained and administered by hereditary trustees. The temple is open daily from 6 a.m. to 10 am, noon to 1 pm and 4 pm to 8 pm.

== Festivals ==
Chariot of Mangaladevi

Navaratri (Dussera) is the time for special pujas performed on all nine days. On the seventh day, Goddess Mangaladevi is worshipped as Chandika (or Marikamaba), on the eighth day the goddess is worshipped as Maha Saraswathi. On the ninth day which is also known as Mahanavami the goddess is worshipped as Vagdevi, goddess for speech, Aayudha puja is performed. All weapons and tools are worshipped, as the day marks the slaying of the cruel demons by the goddess Durga, and Chandika yaaga are also performed on this day. A large number of devotees participate in the Rathothsava on the tenth day, which is celebrated as Dasara. The decorated goddess is mounted on the grand chariot and pulled with thick ropes in a procession that goes to Marnamikatte, where the goddess and the Shami tree (Prosopis cineraria) are worshipped.

== See also ==
Mangala Devi Kannagi Temple
