= List of educational institutions in Mangaluru =

This is a partial list of educational institutions in Mangaluru.

== Institution ==
- Computer training institute in Mangalore
- Yenepoya Deemed to be University
- Mangalore University
- Manipal Academy of Higher Education ( Deemed to be University)
- NITTE Deemed to be University
- National Institute of Technology Karnataka
- Srinivas University
- St. Aloysius College, Light House Hill
- N.M.A.M. Institute of Technology, Nitte, Karkala- Autonomous Institute under VTU, Belgaum
- St. Agnes College - Autonomous Institute affiliated to Mangalore University
- IMJ Institutions Moodlakatte Kundapura

== Engineering colleges ==
- National Institute of Technology Karnataka Surathkal
- Manipal Institute of Technology Udupi
- N.M.A.M. Institute of Technology, Nitte, Udupi
- College of Engineering & Technology, Srinivas University, Mukka
- Sahyadri College of Engineering & Management, Adyar Mangalore
- P A College of Engineering, Deralakatte
- St Joseph Engineering College, Vamanjoor
- AJ Institute of Engineering and Technology, Mangalore
- Canara Engineering College, Benjanapadavu, Bantwal
- Moodlakatte Institute of Technology, Kundapura,Udupi
- KVG College of Engineering, Sullia
- Mangalore Institute of Technology And Engineering (MITE), Moodabidri
- Alva's Institute of Engineering and Technology, Moodabidri
- Yenepoya Institute of Technology Moodabidri
- Bearys Institute of Technology, Mangalore
- Shree Devi Institute Of Technology, Mangalore
- Vivekananda College of Engineering & Technology, Puttur
- SDM Institute of Technology Ujire
- Srinivas Institute Of Technology Mangalore
- Shri Madhwa Vadiraja Institute of Technology & Management, Udupi
- Karavali Institute of Technology, Mangalore
- Mangalore Marine College and Technology, Mangalore

== Public Health Institutes ==
Edward & Cynthia Institute of Public Health

== Medical colleges ==
- A J Institute of Medical Science
- Father Muller Medical College
- K.S. Hegde Medical Academy
- Kasturba Medical College
- Srinivas Institute of Medical Sciences and Research Centre
- Yenepoya Medical College

== Dental colleges ==
- Manipal College of Dental Sciences
- Yenepoya Dental College
- A J Dental College

== Architecture ==
- Nitte Institute of Architecture, under NITTE, Deralakatte

== Law, arts, commerce, science & business management colleges ==
- Yenepoya Institute of Arts, Science, Commerce & Management
- St. Agnes College, Bendore
- Canara College, Kodialbail
- University College, Hampankatta
- St. Aloysius College, Light House Hill
- St. Aloysius Evening College
- St. Agnes PU College
- College of Fisheries, Jeppina Mogaru, Gorigudda
- Govindadasa College, Suratkal
- Mangalore University, Konaje
- Pompei College Aikala, Kinnigoli
- Nitte Institute of Communication, under NITTE
- Nehru Memorial College, Sullia

== High schools ==
- St. Theresa's School, Bendur
- St. Gerosa High School, Jeppu
- Carmel School, Pandeshwar
- Canara High School (Main), Dongerkery
- The Yenepoya School
- Mount Carmel Central School, Maryhill
- VIBGYOR Roots and Rise School at Kulur
- Cascia High School Jeppu
- Sacred Hearts' School, Kulshekar
- Delhi Public School, MRPL
- Lourdes Central School, Mangalore
- Rosario High School, Pandeshwar
- Milagres School, Hampankatta
- Ryan International School, Kulai
- Vidyadayanee High School, Surathkal
- Cambridge School, Neermarga
