= IMJ Institutions Moodlakatte Kundapura =

Educational group in Karnataka, India

IMJ Institutions
- Type: Engineering,Management, Commerce, Science, Nursing, Physiotherapy, Allied Health Sciences, Paramedical Sciences
- Established: 2004
- Academic affiliations: Visvesvaraya Technological University (VTU,Rajiv Gandhi University of Health Sciences (RGUHS), Mangalore University
- Chairman: Siddharth J Shetty
- Director: Dr. S.N. Bhat
- Location: Kundapura, Karnataka, India; 13°36′51″N 74°43′57″E
- Campus: Rural
- Accreditation: AICTE, NACC
- Website: www.imjinstitutions.com

IMJ Institutions is a private educational group in Moodlakatte, Kundapura, Udupi District, Karnataka, India. It traces its origins to the establishment of Moodlakatte Institute of Technology in 2004 by Late I. M. Jayarama Shetty, an engineer, entrepreneur, philanthropist, and former Member of Parliament from Udupi. Founded with the objective of providing quality higher education to students, particularly from rural and coastal Karnataka, the institution has since expanded into a multidisciplinary educational group offering programmes in engineering, management, commerce, science, nursing, physiotherapy, allied health sciences, paramedical sciences, and early childhood education. The institutions are managed by the Moodlakatte Nagarathna Bhujanga Shetty (MNBS) Trust.

== List of institutions ==
The IMJ educational group comprises the following institutions:

- Moodlakatte Institute of Technology & Management (https://www.mitkundapura.com)
- IMJ Institute of Science and Commerce (https://www.imjisc.com)
- Moodlakatte College of Nursing (https://www.mcnkundapura.com)
- Moodlakatte College of Physiotherapy (https://www.mcptkundapura.com)
- IMJ College of Allied Health Sciences (https://www.imjahs.com)
- Moodlakatte Institute of Paramedical Sciences (https://www.mipskundapura.com)
- Vidya Academy (Pre-School) (https://www.vidyaacademy.org.in)
- IMJ Institute of Research (IMJIR) (https://www.imjir.org)

== See also ==
- List of educational institutions in Mangalore
- List of engineering colleges affiliated to Visvesvaraya Technological University
