= St. Paul's Church, Mangalore =

St. Paul's (Military Church)
- St. Paul's Church
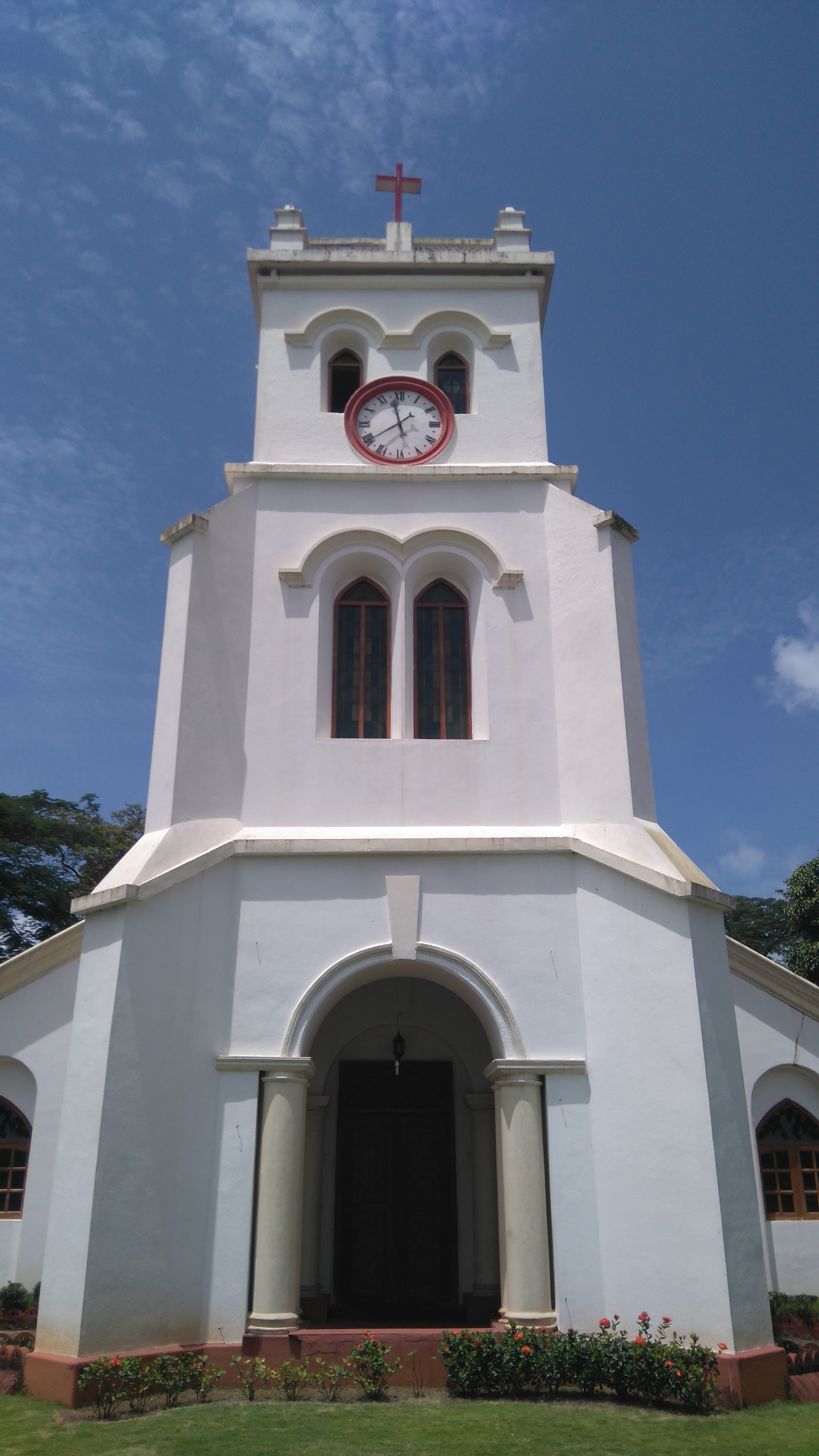
- Entrance of the church
- St. Paul's (Military Church)
- 12°51′42″N 74°50′15″E
- Location: Central Maidan, Mangalore
- Country: India
- Denomination: Church of South India
- Tradition: Anglican

History
- Consecrated: 1843

Architecture
- Style: English Baroque
- Groundbreaking: 1841
- Completed: 1843
- Construction cost: ₨ 7,215

Administration
- Diocese: Karnataka Southern Diocese

St. Paul's Church is an Anglican church in Mangalore, India.

St. Paul's Church is located at the south-west corner of the Nehru Maidan (formerly the Central Maidan) in Mangalore. It was the first Protestant church to be raised in the South Kanara region. St. Paul's was originally a garrison church, raised by the British India army of the Madras Government, built using prison labour. St. Paul's is an imposing structure amidst the chaos of the fish market, service bus stand, and the State Bank of India.

== History ==
In 1568, Admiral Diego de Silvera of the Portuguese fleet conquered the fort of Mangalore and went on to build a Portuguese Fort of St. Sebastian (the present Deputy Commissioner's Office). Portuguese rule continued till 1763 when Mangalore was captured by the Muslim ruler Hyder Ali. In 1768, Mangalore was captured by the British India Army during the First Anglo-Mysore War, before being transferred back to Tippu Sultan in 1784 as per the Treaty of Mangalore. After the fall of Tippu Sultan in the Fourth Anglo-Mysore War of 1799 at Seringapatam, Mangalore once again fell into British Control, annexed into the Madras Presidency. In June 1799, Capt. Thomas Munro was appointed as the first Collector of Canara region, by the Governor-General of India Richard Wellesley, on the personal recommendation of his brother Col. Arthur Wellesley. Mangalore went to become a strategically important port for the East India Company, and hence a small army unit was maintained to preserve law and order in the Canara region, and for guarding the border passes into Mysore Princely State. The army unit was further strengthened after the Amara Sullia Rebellion of 1837, when Mangalore was attacked. The fortification of Mangalore resulted in a need for the church to meet the spiritual and moral needs of the British soldiers and citizens. Hence, in 1841, Rev. R W Whitford, garrison chaplain appealed to the Government of Madras to construct a church in Mangalore, which was accepted. In 1842, Rev. Alfred Fennell succeeded Rev. Whitford. The church building was completed in 1842, and consecrated by George Spencer, Church of England, Bishop of Madras, on 5 January 1843.

== Construction ==
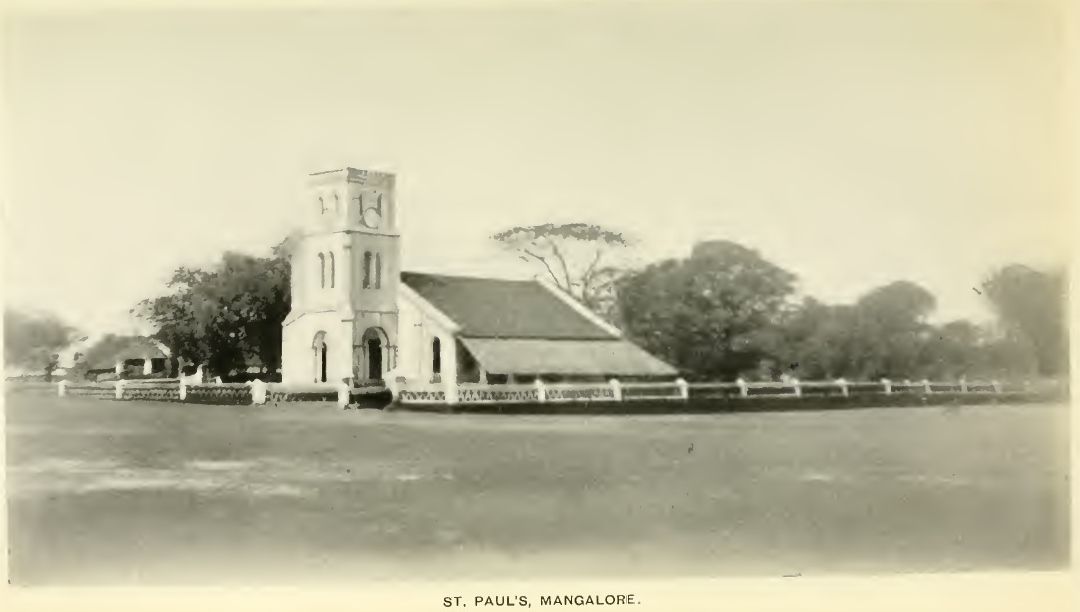
St. Paul's Church, 1922

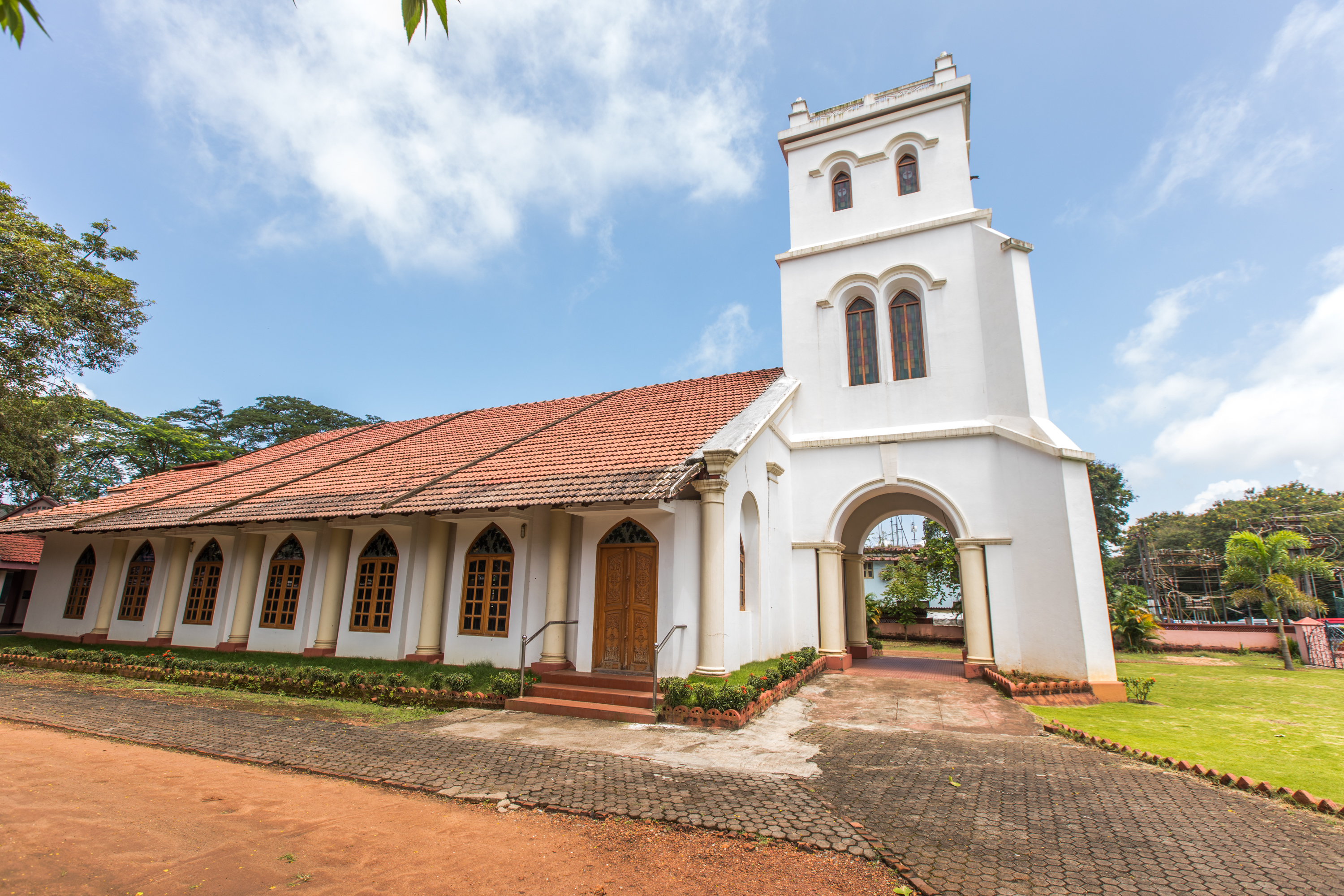
St. Paul's Church, 2016

The construction site of the St. Paul's Church, Mangalore, was at the Fort St Sebastian, the main seat of British power in Canara, on a 0.5-acre (0.2 ha) plot.

The initial budget was ₨ 5,128, and was to accommodate 120 people. However, as a result of rising costs and insufficient funds it was decided to reduce the capacity of the church building to 100. The building works were initiated in 1842 by Rev. Alfred Fennel, and the church building was completed and was furnished before the arrival of Bishop Spencer to Mangalore, and was consecrated on 5 January 1843. The final cost of construction was ₨ 7,215. The church was constructed using prison labour.

After construction, the internal area of the church is 57 by 25 feet (17.4 m × 7.6 m), with sufficient place allowed for the pulpit, sanctuary, lectern and clergy stall, could seat nearly 100 people.

== Clock Tower ==
Extensive repairs to the church were undertaken in 1897, during which the church tower was added. The church tower of St. Paul's has a clock, with two dials. The clock was made in the Mangalore workshop of the Basel Mission, and installed by its German missionaries. The clock continues to function accurately. After the demolition of clock tower in Hampankatta, the clock tower of St. Paul's is the only remaining clock tower in Mangalore.

== Basel Mission ==
The German missionaries of the Basel Mission worshipped in St. Paul's Church until 1862, when the Balmatta Hill Shanti Church (now Cathedral) was established.

== Present Status ==
In 1947, after Indian Independence, St. Paul's became part of the Church of South India, under the CSI North Kerala Diocese. In 1971, it was transferred to the Karnataka Southern Diocese. It presently has around 115 families as members, and also strives to meet the spiritual needs of locals, and domestic and foreign visitors. In 2003, a community hall, located at the rear of the church, was inaugurated by Rev. C. L. Furtado, CSI Bishop of Mangalore.

== St. Paul's Cemetery ==
St. Paul's Cemetery is located on Old Kent Road, near the railway tracks of the Mangalore Central Station, and is the resting place of many officers of the East India Company and British citizens. A notable grave is that Brigadier General John Carnac, Commander-in-Chief of forces at Bengal, who in 1761 defeated Shah Zaddar, and died in Mangalore, aged 84, on 29 November 1800. The church records the officers of the East India Company who died in battle from 1855, and burial records from 1859.
