= Rosario High School, Pandeshwar =

Rosario High School Rosario Composite Pre-university

Location
- Pandeshwar, Mangaluru, Karnataka; India
- Coordinates: 12.856717°N 74.836421°E

Information
- Religious affiliation: Catholic
- Founded: 1858
- Grades: 5–12

The Rosario High School, recently renamed as Rosario Composite Pre-university, is a high school in Pandeshwar, Mangaluru in the Indian state of Karnataka. The school teaches grades 5 to 12 under the Karnataka Board of Secondary Education and the Karnataka Council of Higher Secondary Education.

== History ==
Rosario School was one of the oldest Catholic Schools in Mangaluru founded in 1858. In the year 1849 Bishop Antony who came from Rome invited the Congregation of Christian brothers from France to found a primary school at Mangaluru to provide education to the children of the vicinity. The school was administered by the Parish Priests of Rosario Cathedral who also functioned as the correspondents of the school. The School played a very significant role in the destiny of thousands of Mangaloreans of all religious and castes.

Initially classes were held up to V std. From 1858 to 1869 the school was called Rosario Elementary School, under the management of a separate Educational Board. From 1869 to 1946 it was called Rosario Secondary school and was the under the management of Rosario Cathedral Church. Later it was named Rosario High School.

From the year 1968 the Management of the School was taken over by the Catholic Board of Education, based at Bishops House Mangalore.

The 1st Batch of VI form (SSLC) students appeared for their Public examination conducted by the erstwhile Madras Government in the year 1948 -49. At present there are 3 sections each in 8th, 9th, 10th classes, of which one section each is taught in English and remaining in Kannada.

== Location ==
The Rosario High School is in Pandeshwar, about 2 kilometres (1.2 mi) from Hampankatta, in the centre of the city of Mangaluru in India.
