= Fiza by Nexus =

Shopping mall in India

Coordinates: 12.8575°N 74.8383°E

Fiza by Nexus is a shopping mall in Karnataka, located on Pandeshwar road in Mangaluru, India 1 km (0.62 mi) away from the Mangalore Central railway station. Popularly known as Nexus Mall, it opened to the public in May 2014. It provides shopping, dining, entertainment and leisure activities.

== Events ==
- In 2016, Fiza by Nexus conducted the world's largest micro art workshop which had over 8000 participants.
- In September 2017, they conducted The Purple Run, which took place across 5 Nexus malls across 4 cities. This run was aimed to create awareness about Alzheimer's Disease, raise fund for research and remove the stigma surrounding mental health issues.
- In February 2018, Fiza by Nexus hosted a live concert by Arjun Kanungo, a popular Indian singer, composer and songwriter and held the Indian Auto Show, which featured cars from global automobile brands.

== Gallery ==
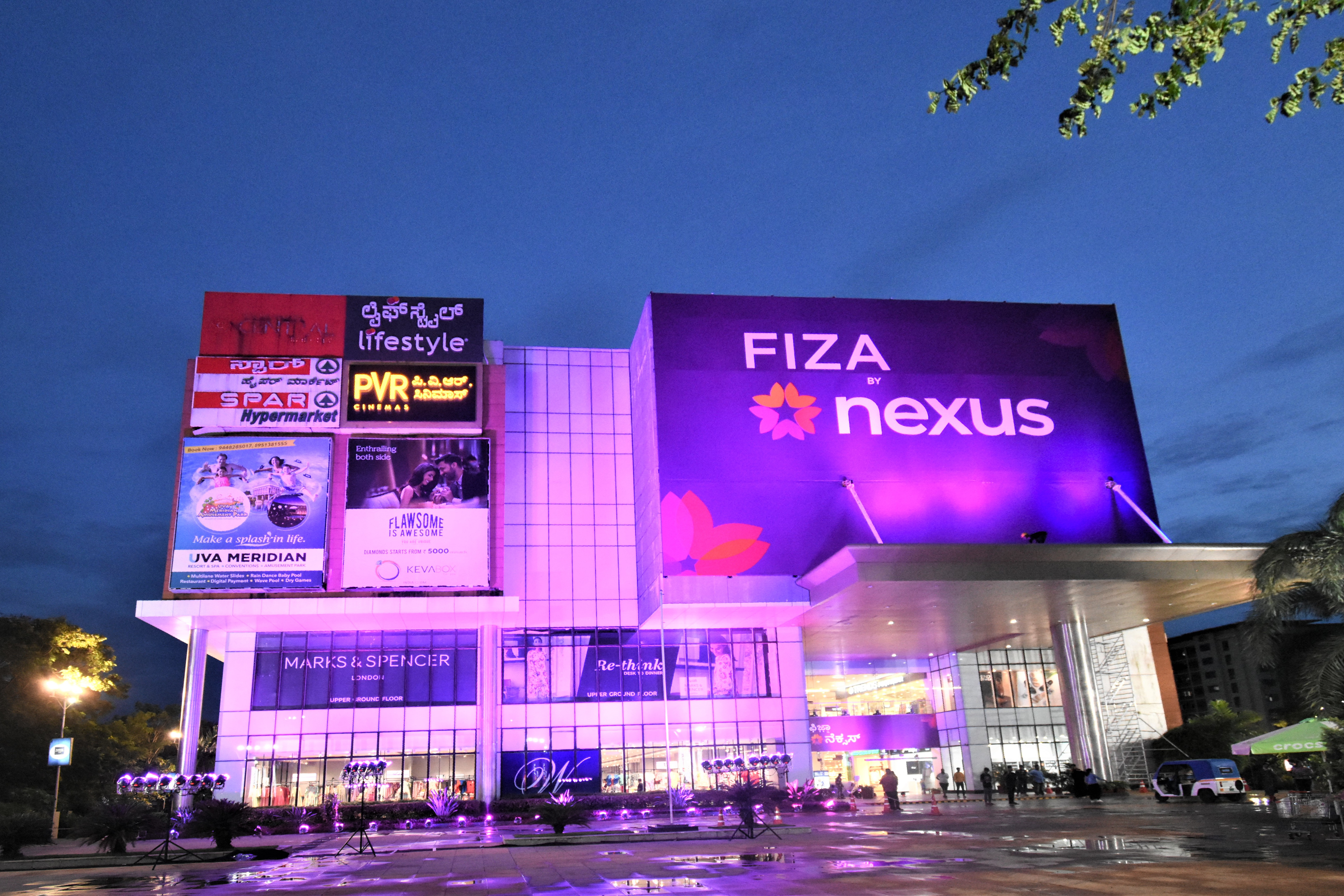
Fiza By Nexus, Pandeshwar Mangalore

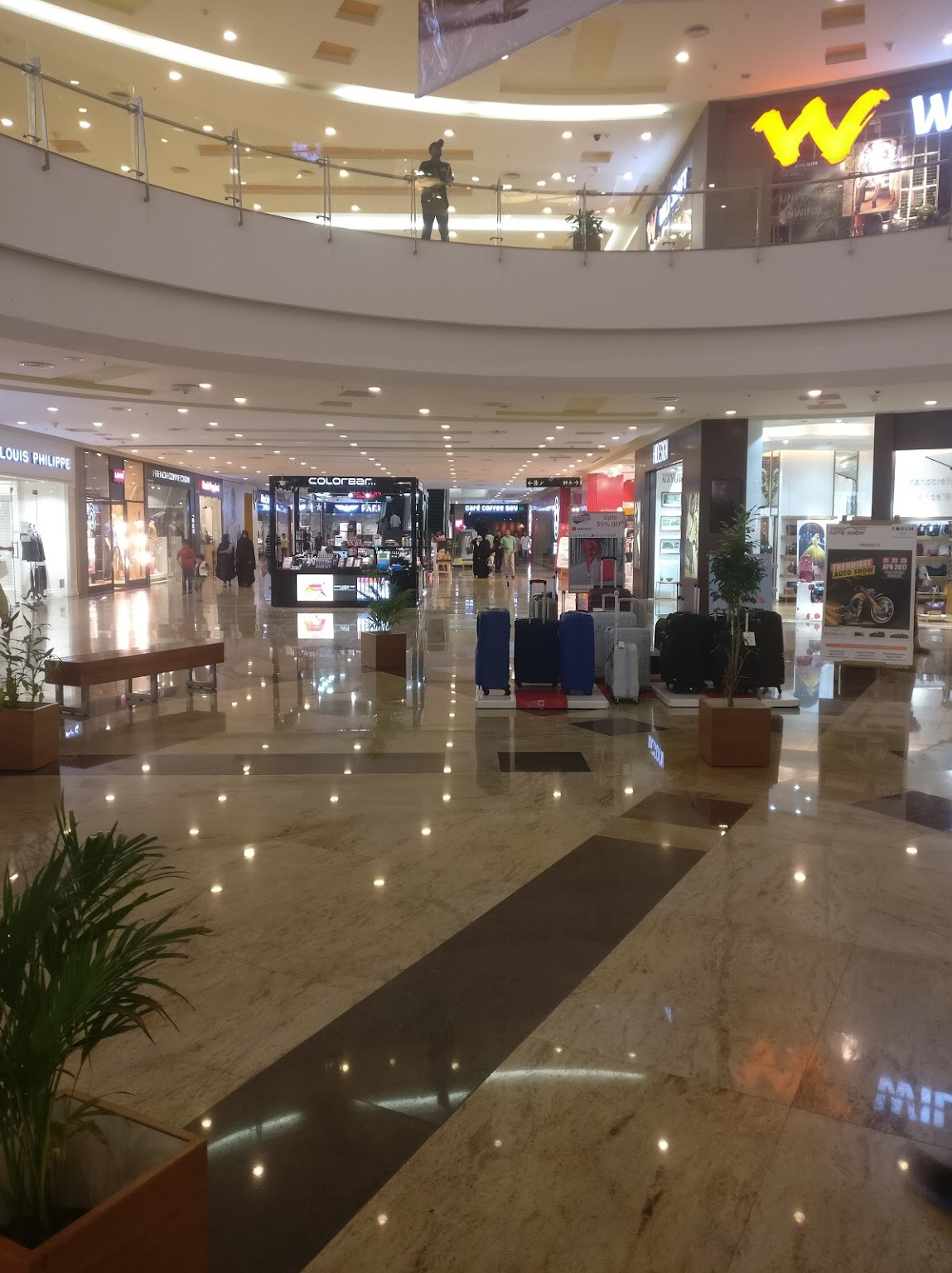
Inside view of Fiza by Nexus

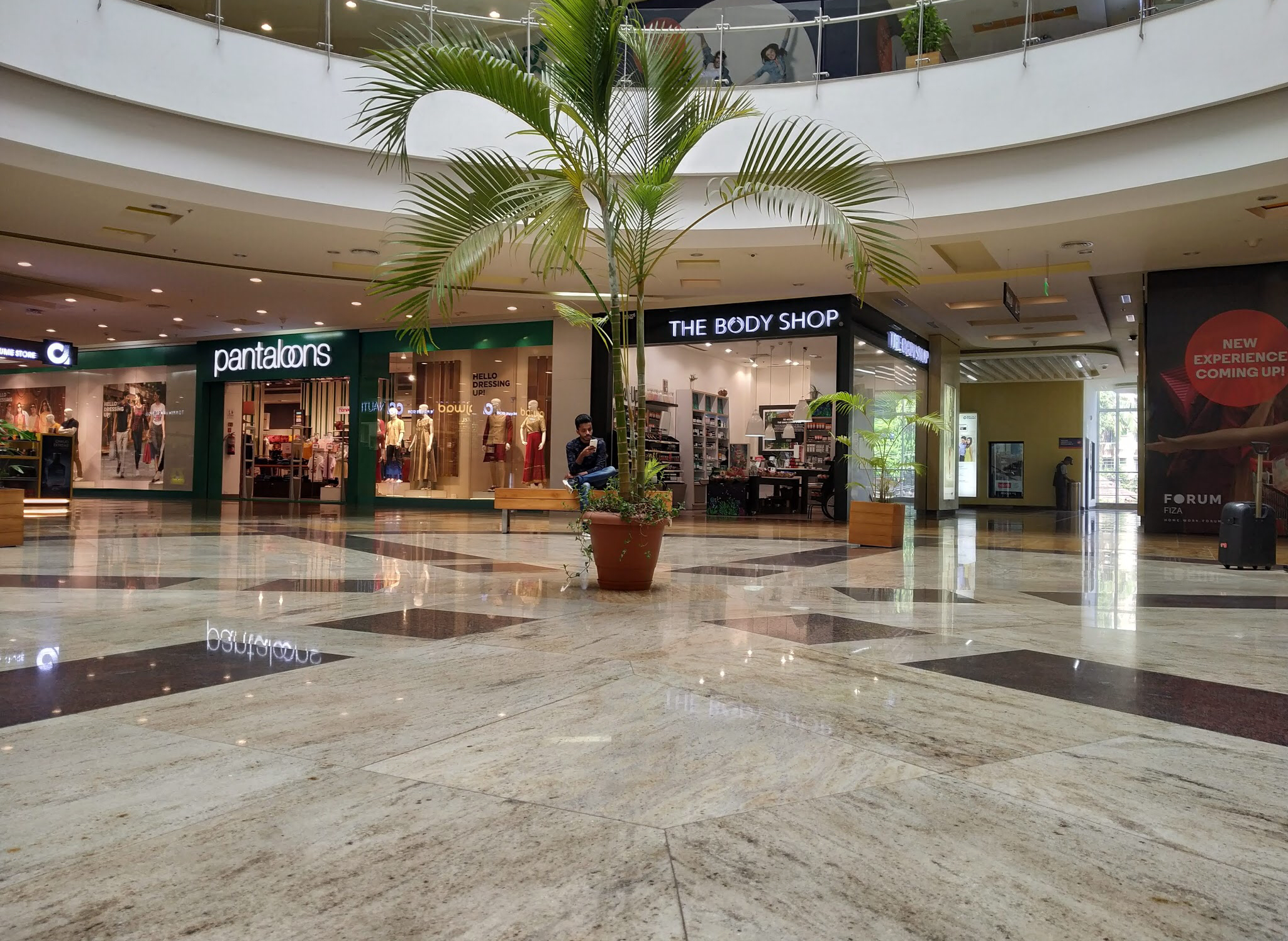
Interior view of Fiza by Nexus

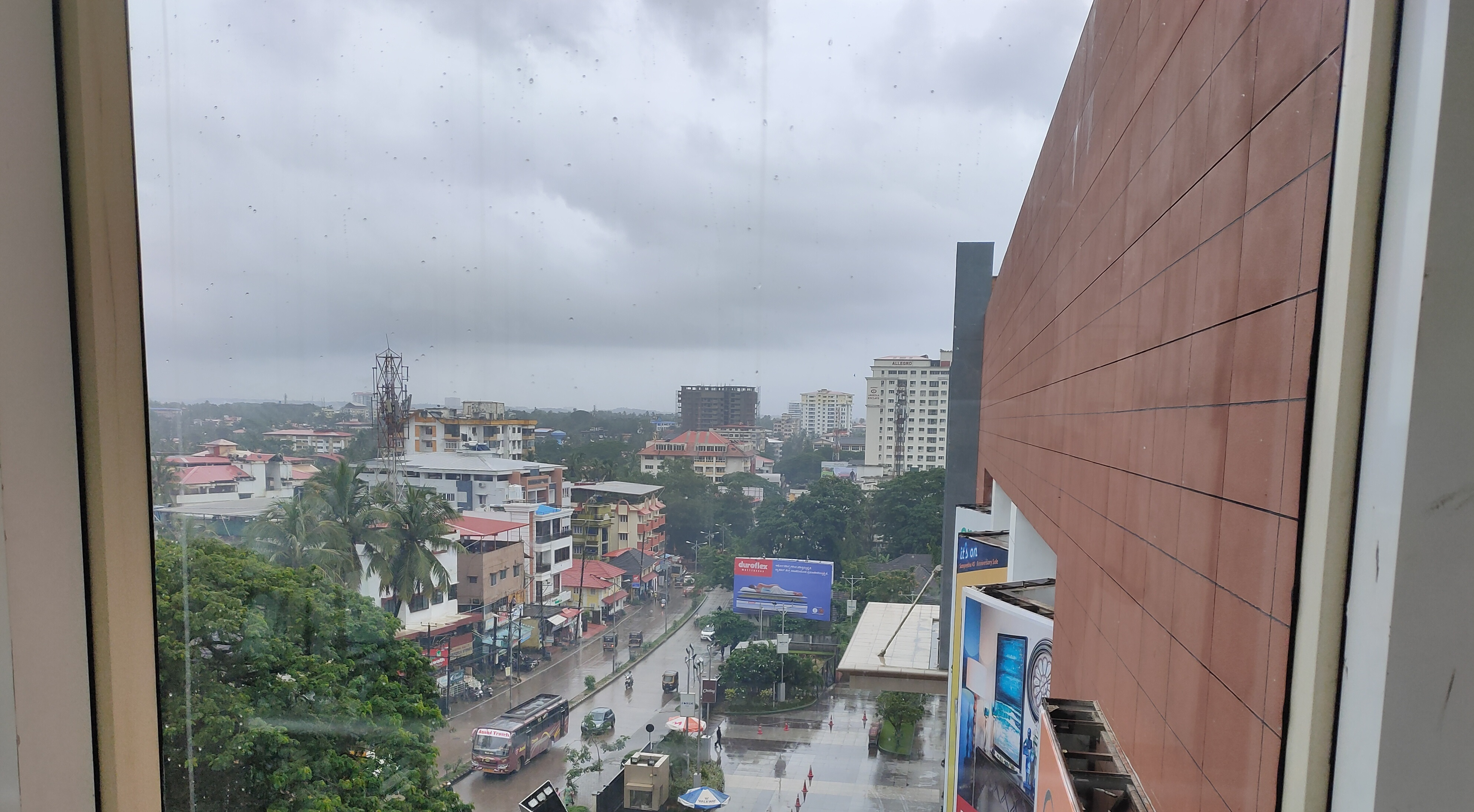
Pandeshwar skyline from Fiza by Nexus, Mangaluru

== See also ==
- Economy of Mangaluru
