= Moodlakatte Institute of Technology =

- Motto: Sathyamvada Dharmamchara
- Type: Private-Un Aided Engineering & Management Institution
- Established: 2004
- Affiliations: Visvesvaraya Technological University
- President: I. M. Siddharth Shetty
- Principal: Dr. Ramakrishna Hegde
- Director: Dr. Shankaranarayana Bhat M.
- Location: Kundapur, Karnataka, India; 13°36′51″N 74°43′57″E
- Campus: Rural
- Website: http://www.mitkundapura.com/

Moodlakatte Institute of Technology (MIT Kundapura, MITK) is a higher education institute located in Kundapur, Karnataka, India. it was founded by I. M. Jayarama Shetty in the year 2004. It is one of the institutions under IMJ Institutions Moodlakatte Kundapura. It is affiliated to Visvesvaraya Technological University and approved by All India Council for Technical Education (AICTE).

It is situated in Moodlakatte, about 200 meters from Kundapura railway station. Moodlakatte Institute of Technology is the product of the charitable trust Moodlakatte Nagarathna Bhujanga Shetty Trust (R.), situated in a beautiful natural environment of coastal karnataka, in front of Kundapura Railway Station in a small village called Moodlakatte. It was established in the year 2004.

== Courses ==
The Institute offers 4-year UG programmes, 2-year PG programmes and a Research Programme.

B.E. Degree Programmes:

- Computer Science & Engineering
- Computer Science & Engineering (Data Science)
- Computer Science & Engineering (Cyber Security)
- Artificial Intelligence and Machine Learning
- Information Science & Engineering
- Electronics & Communications Engineering
- Computer Science & Engineering (Artificial Intelligence and Machine Learning)

Postgraduate Programmes:

- Master of Business Administration (MBA)
- Master of Computer Applications (MCA)

Research Programme:

- Ph.D. - Electronics and Communication Engineering

== Students Associations ==
- IEEE Student Branch
- Computer Society of India
- TRICS - Tribunes of Computer Savviers
- EMINENCE - E & C Association
- NSS
- Youth Red Cross Unit

== Hostels ==
They built separate hostels for both boys and girls in the campus

== See also ==
- List of educational institutions in Mangalore
- List of engineering colleges affiliated to Visvesvaraya Technological University
