= Town Hall, Mangaluru =

Town Hall, Mangalore
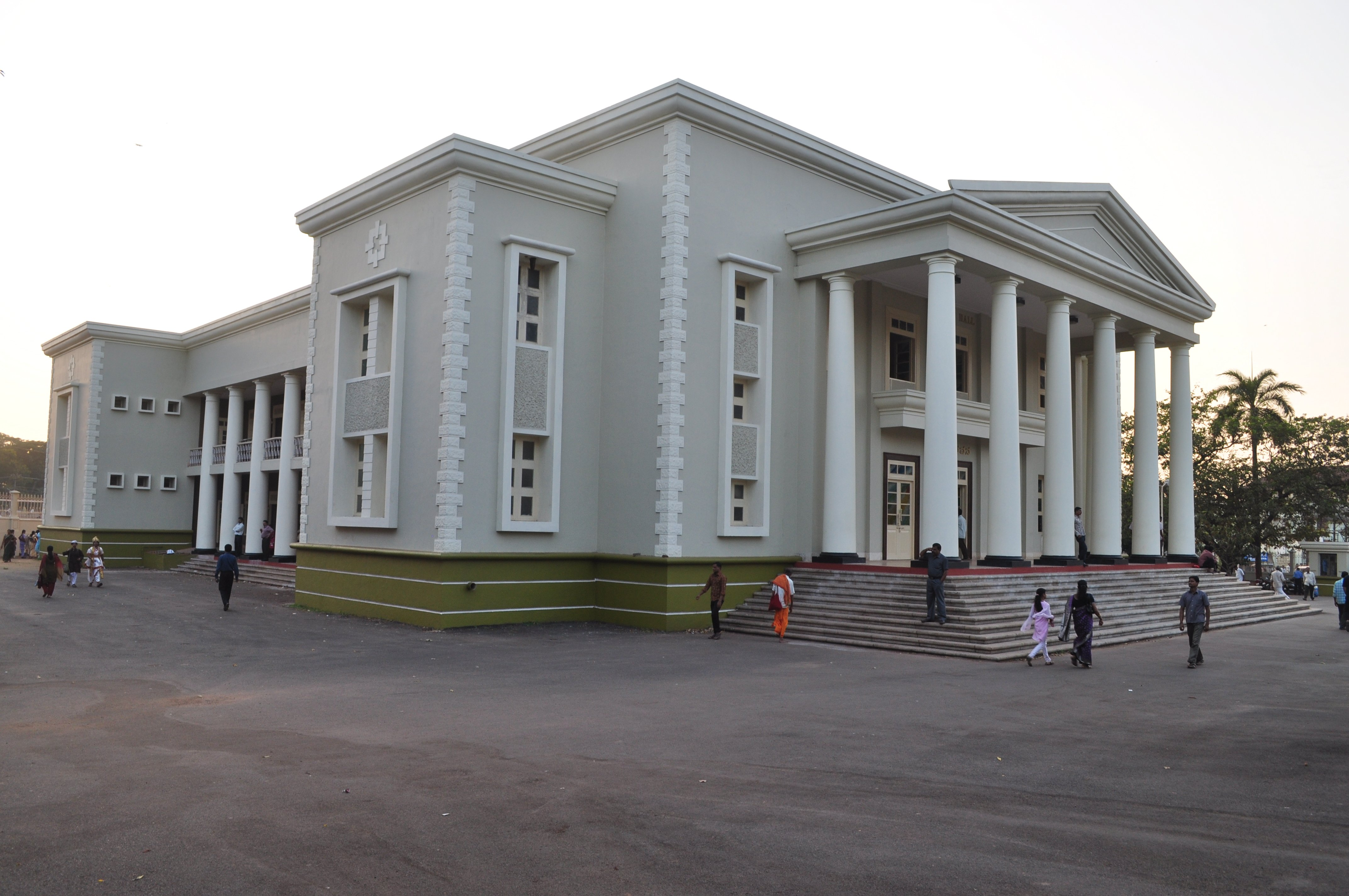
- Location: Hampankatta, Mangaluru, Karnataka, India
- Owner: Mangaluru City Corporation
- Operator: Mangaluru City Corporation
- Capacity: 900

Construction
- Built: 29 December 1964
- Renovated: November 2016

Town Hall of Mangaluru, inaugurated on 29 December 1964 is a Town Hall situated in Hampankatta locality of Mangaluru, Karnataka which is a prominent platform for all major social, political and cultural events in the city.

== Overview ==
Yakshagana, Tulu, Kannada, Konkani Dramas are staged in Town Hall. Especially most of the Tulu Drama's maiden show is played here before the teams start their tours.

It was renovated in November 2016 at a cost of Rs 4.58 crore and was inaugurated on Children's Day.
