= University College, Mangaluru =

University College
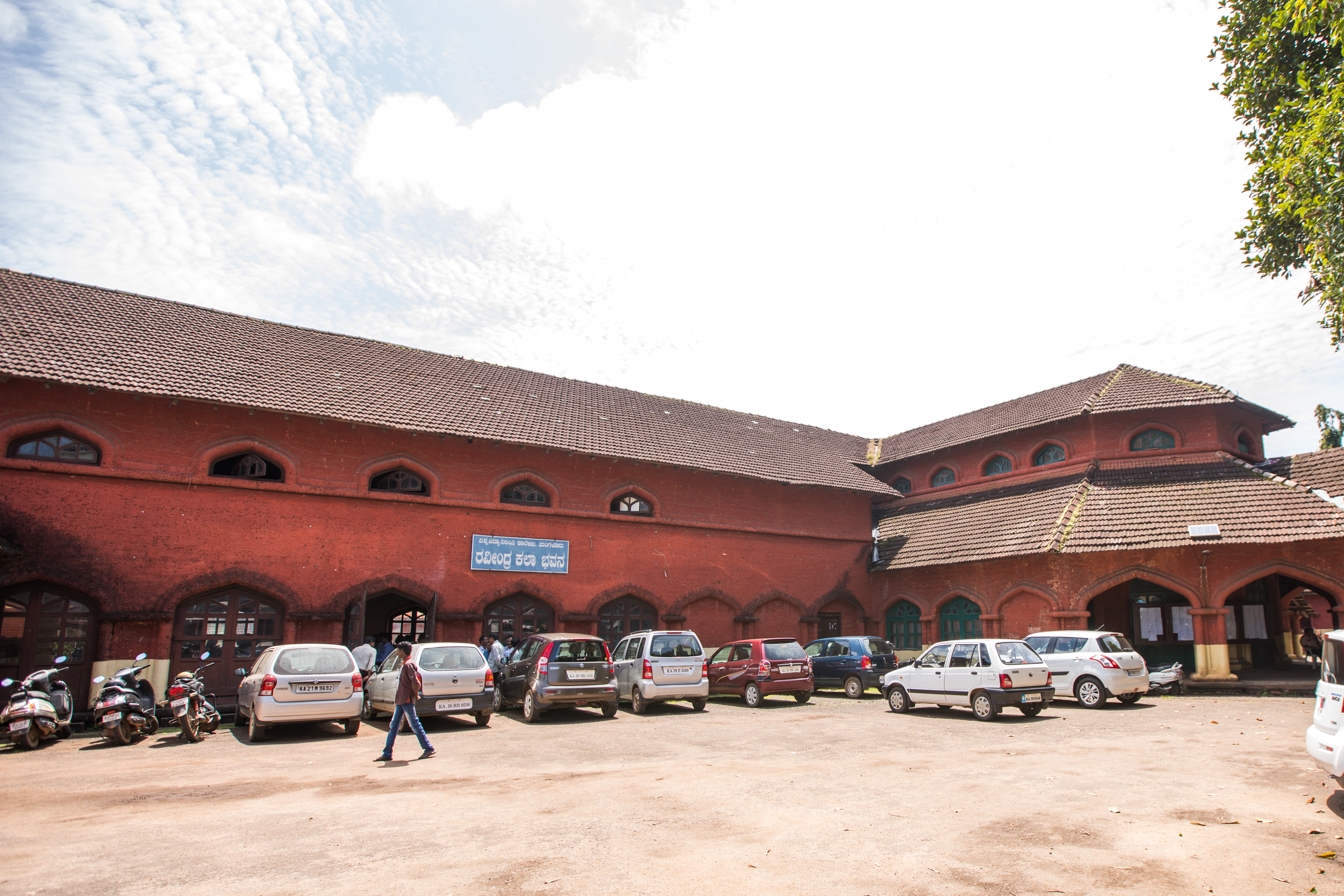
- Type: Constituent College
- Established: 1868
- Affiliations: Mangalore University
- Principal: Dr.Anasuya Rai
- Location: Mangaluru, Karnataka, India; 12°51′57″N 74°50′28″E
- Campus: Urban, 8 acres

University College was established in 1868 in Mangaluru city of Karnataka in India. The campus is situated on an eight-acre land at Hampankatta in Mangalore. This college became a constituent college of Mangalore University on 7 March 1993. It is among the 19 colleges chosen by the University Grants Commission (UGC) for 'heritage status' across the country.

== Alumni ==
Notable alumni from this college include

- K. Shivaram Karanth
- Kamaladevi Chattopadhyay
- Veerappa Moily
- Ramanath Rai
- M. V. Kamath
- P. M. Sayeed
- K. Suryanarayana Adiga
- Panje Mangesh Rao
- M. Govinda Pai
