= P. Subrahmanya Yadapadithaya =

Indian academic

P. Subrahmanya Yadapadithaya is an Indian academic professor. He served as vice-chancellor of Mangalore University for four years from June 2019 until June 2023 and was affiliated with the Faculty of Commerce.

Subramanya Yadapadithaya was a professor in the department of commerce in Mangalore University before assuming office as vice chancellor As first batch student, he secured first rank and gold medal in Master of Commerce in 1982 from Mangalore University and completed his Phd in 1992.

P.Subramanya Yadapadithaya is the first alumni of the university to occupy the position of vice chancellor. He was presented best vice chancellor award on 27 August 2022 during the second Higher Education and Innovation Summit held at New Delhi.

He took charge at BESTIU in June 2024 as Vice Chancellor.
