= B.E.S.T Innovation University =

University in India

B E S T Innovation University
- Other names: Bhartiya Engineering Science & Technology innovation university (BESTIU)
- Type: State private university
- Established: 2019
- Founder: Bharat Lal Meena
- Accreditation: UGC, NAAC
- Academic affiliations: AIU
- Chairman: Bharat Lal Meena
- Chancellor: Rupa Vasudevan
- Location: Gownivaripalli, Gorantla, Andhra Pradesh, India; 14.766°N 77.601°E
- Campus: Rural, 134 acres (54 ha)
- Website: bestiu.edu.in

B.E.S.T Innovation University (BESTIU), or by its full name Bharatiya Engineering Science and Technology Innovation University, is a private university located in Gownivaripaill, Gorantla in Andhra Pradesh, India.

It is recognized by University Grants Commission under Section 2(f) with the right to confer degrees as per Section 22(1) of the UGC Act, 1956. It was established in 2019 by former IAS officer, Bharat Lal Meena, who assumed the role as Founder and Chairman of the University. The University recently concluded its 2nd Convocation Ceremony, where a number of students graduated.

== History ==
BESTIU was established in 2019 under the Andhra Pradesh Private Universities (Establishment and Regulation) (Amendment) Act, 2019 which was passed in the Andhra Pradesh Legislative Assembly in February 2019 and notified later that month.

== Vice Chancellors ==
Dr. S S Biligi - Until 14 June 2024.

P. Subrahmanya Yadapadithaya - From 15 June 2024 - September 2024

Dr. Nagajyothi Koripella is the present vice chancellor.
