= St. Agnes College, Mangaluru =

College in Karnataka, India

Coordinates: 12°52′33″N 74°51′25″E

St. Agnes College
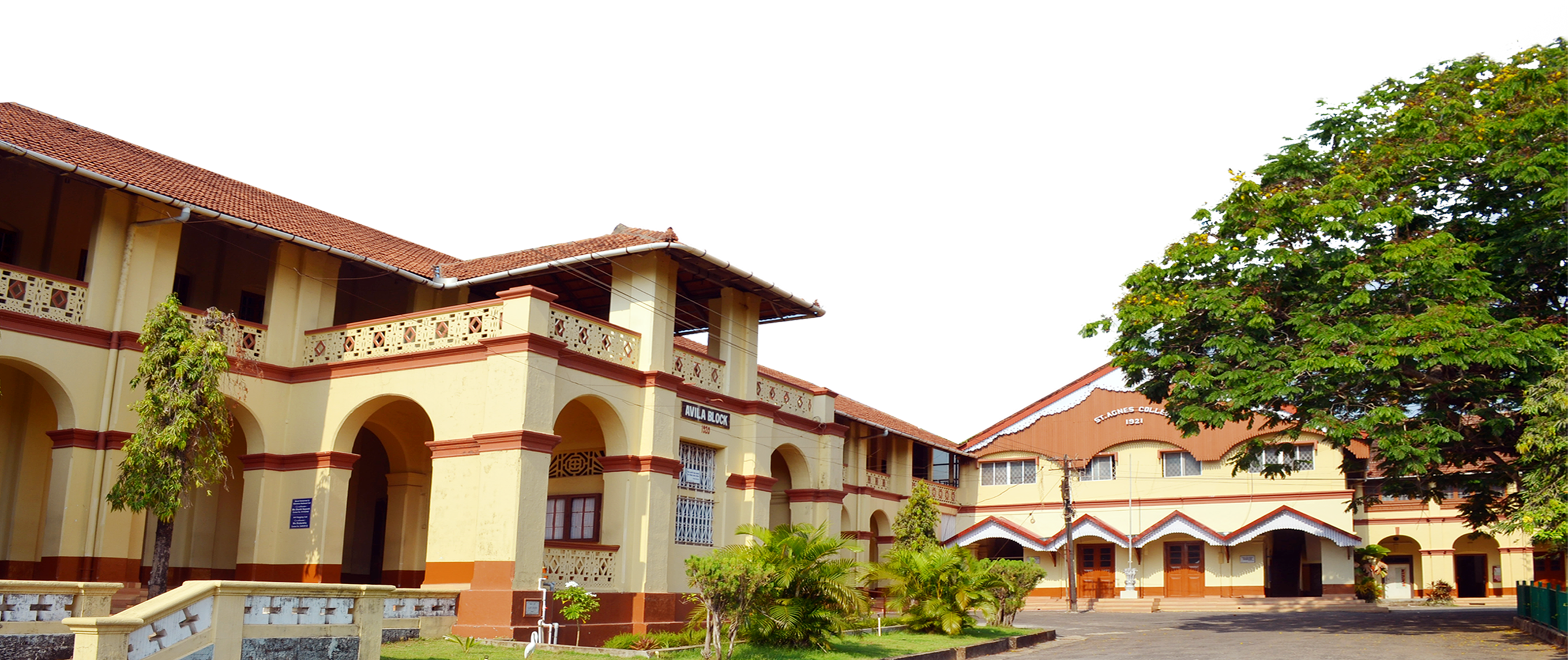
- College building
- Motto: Latin: Deus fortitudo mea English: God is our strength
- Type: Private
- Established: 1921
- Principal: Sr. M. Venissa A.C.
- Location: Mangaluru, Karnataka, India
- Campus: Urban
- Mascot: Lamb with the victory palm

St. Agnes College is an autonomous Catholic institution located in Mangaluru, India. The college offers undergraduates and postgraduate programmes in arts and sciences, affiliated with Mangalore University.

== History ==
The Apostolic Carmel Congregation was founded by Venerable Mother Veronica in 1868 and established at Mangalore, India, in 1870. The college was founded by Mother Mary Aloysia and formally inaugurated on 2 July 1921 under the Madras University.

== Accreditation ==
The college was awarded the status of 'College with Potential for Excellence' by the UGC in 2017. The college has been assessed and re-accredited with an 'A+' Grade and CGPA 3.65 out of 4.

== Departments ==
- Business Administration
- Botany
- Chemistry
- Commerce
- Computer Applications
- Computer Science
- Economics
- English
- Hindi
- History
- Kannada
- Mathematics
- Microbiology
- Physics
- Political Science
- Psychology
- Secretarial Practice
- Statistics
- Zoology
- French
- Malayalam
- Physical Education
- M.A. English
- M.Com.
- M.Sc. Psychology
- M.Sc. Chemistry
- M.Sc. Big Data Analytics
- M.Sc. Clinical Psychology

== Achievements ==
- The college is the recipient of the "Jimmy and Rosalynn Carter Foundation" partnership international award for its path breaking work in the field of water shed management.
- The college was awarded the status of 'College with Potential for Excellence' by the UGC in 2006.
- The college has been recognized as a college of excellence by the UGC New Delhi in 2017.
- The college is the recipient of Star College Status by DBT, MST, Govt.of India.
