= Govindadasa College =

College in India

Govindadasa College (established in 1967) is affiliated to Mangalore University in Surathkal, India. It offers bachelor's degree courses in Science (Bsc), Commerce (Bcom), Arts (BA) and Management (BBA), and Computer Application (BCA). The college also offers Mcom and Msc in chemistry. When the college was started, it was affiliated to University of Mysore as Mangalore University was non existent then. The college is also the study centre for Karnataka state open university.

The college is situated in front of Iddya Mahalingeshwara temple at Surathkal adjoining National Highway 66 (previously NH 17). The college is managed by the Hindu Vidyadayanee Sangha, which also manages other educational institutions like Vidyadayanee High School at Suratkal, Vidyadayani Higher Primary School, and Venkataramana Primary School.

The college provides people from rural areas access to higher education. It has been included in University Grants Commission's list with permanent affiliation. The college has bagged several ranks in the past in examinations conducted by Mangalore University.

== Infrastructure available ==
The college has its own building with spacious classrooms. It has its own playground, gymnasium, laboratories, computer centre and library. All these are equipped to take care the requirements of undergraduate and postgraduate students. It has also hostel for ladies.

== Govindadasa Pre University College ==
The pre university section teaching PUC (10+2) of the Karnataka Board in science, arts and commerce streams, was run along with degree courses for many years sharing same infrastructure.

As per rules of University Grants Commission, the pre university section has now been separated to form junior or pre university college. The Govindadasa PU college is now housed in a separate building.
