= Government First Grade College, Mangalore =

College in Karnataka, India

First Grade College Mangalore
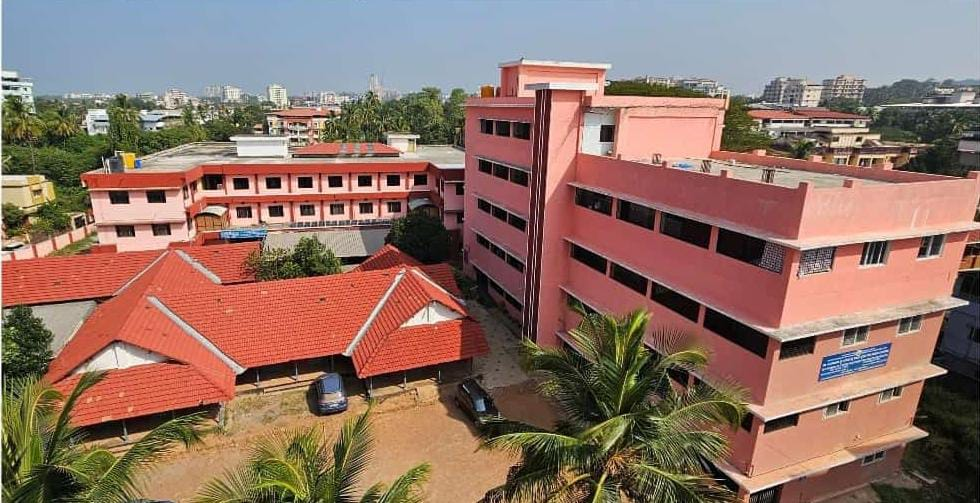
- Dr. P. Dayananda Pai - P. Satisha Pai Government First Grade College Mangalore
- Type: Public
- Established: 2007
- Accreditation: NAAC, UGC
- Affiliations: Mangalore University
- Principal: Dr. Jayakara Bhandary
- Location: Carstreet, Mangalore, Karnataka, India; 12°52′18″N 74°50′13″E
- Campus: Urban
- Website: Official website

Dr. P. Dayananda Pai - P. Sathisha Pai Government First Grade College Mangalore (also known as the Carstreet College) is a degree college located in Mangalore, Karnataka. It was established in 2007. The college is permanently affiliated with Mangalore University and is accredited 'A' grade by the National Assessment and Accreditation Council.

== History ==
The college is located in Mangalore, Karnataka, India. It was established in 2007 and was initially based at the Government PU College building in Balmatta but relocated to the Government Primary School building in Carstreet in 2008. The college was renamed to the Dr. P. Dayananda Pai- P. Sathisha Pai Government First Grade College in October 2017 and was reopened by Basavaraj Rayareddy, Minister for Higher Education of the State of Karnataka. The inauguration ceremony was attended by patrons Dayananda Pai and Sathisha Pai. Over the years the college has grown and expanded its academic programs.

The college is permanently affiliated to Mangalore University. The Principal of the college is Dr.Jayakara Bhandary M.

== Academics ==
The Government First Grade College offers various academic courses for Post graduate in MA, MCOM, MSW disciplines

=== Under graduate (UG) ===
- Bachelor of Arts(BA)
- Bachelor of Commerce(BCOM)
- Bachelor of Science(BSC)
- Bachelor of Social Work(BSW)
- Bachelor of Computer Application(BCA)
- Bachelor of Business Administration(BBA)

=== Post graduate (PG) ===
- Master of Arts(MA)
- Master of Commerce(MCOM)
- Master of Social Work(MSW)

=== Curricular activities ===
- National Service Scheme
- Youth Red Cross
- Rovers and Rangers

== Accreditation ==
The college is recognized by the University Grants Commission and was accredited 'A' grade by the National Assessment and Accreditation Council in March 2023 after its second cycle of assessment.
