= Milagres School, Mangaluru =

Milagres School

Location
- Mangaluru, Karnataka, 575001; India; 12.856721°N 74.836424°E

Information
- Type: CBSE
- Motto: Fortior Sanctior Doctior (Passion for Perfection)
- Patron saint: Mother Mary
- Established: 1848; 178 years ago
- Grades: 1 to 10, Pre-University and Degree

Milagres School, also known as Milagres CBSE School, is located at the Hampankatta locality in Mangaluru city in the Karnataka state of India. It was established by Bishop Bernardin in the year 1848. Milagres school became affiliated to the CBSE board in 2017.

Various co-curricular activities include Dance classes, Drawing classes, Music classes, Karate classes and Sports classes mainly in Football, Cricket and Chess.

== History ==
Milagres Educational Institution was founded by Bishop Rt. Rev. Bernardin in 1848. In the beginning, it was started as a Primary English School with classes I to V and higher classes were added gradually. The Higher Secondary school was started on July 23, 1929. The Government of Karnataka upgraded the High School into Pre-University College on July 5, 1982.
