= Nehru Maidan =

- Central Maidan
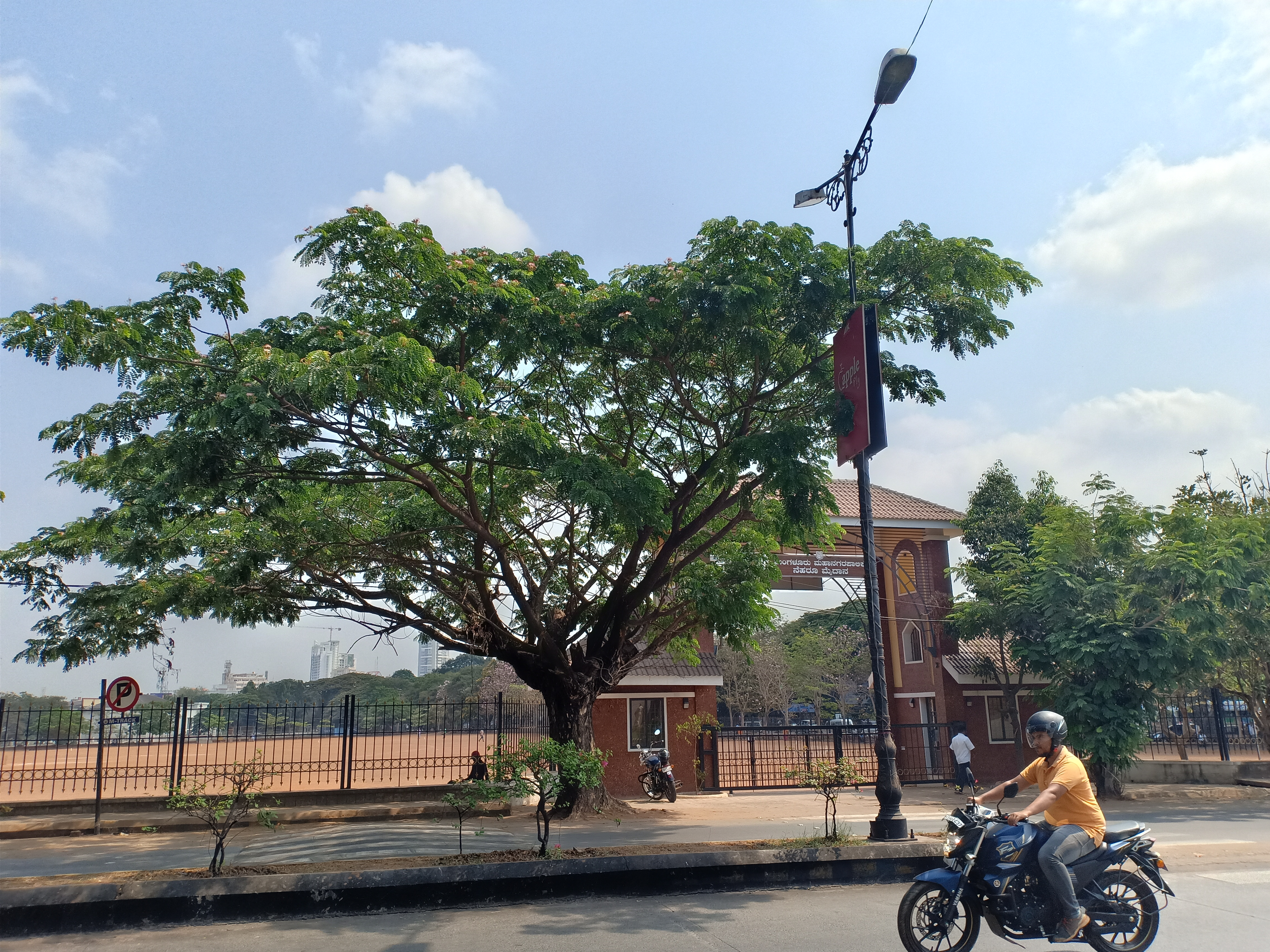
- Near the entrance of Nehru Maidan in Mangalore
- Interactive map of Nehru Maidan
- Location: Mangalore City, Karnataka
- Coordinates: 12.8625°N 74.8386°E
- Owner: Mangalore City Corporation
- Operator: Mangalore City Corporation
- Public transit: Bus Stands: State Bank and Hampankatta Railway Station: Mangalore Central

Nehru Maidan or Central Maidan is a multi purpose ground in Mangalore, Karnataka, India. This ground is situated in heart of the city Hampankatta. The ground is mainly used for organizing matches of football, cricket and other sports. Also known for many public events organized here such as political rallies, religious festivals, exhibitions.

Nehru Maidan was named after the first Indian Prime Minister, Jawaharlal Nehru.

Nehru Maidan is an important venue hosting domestic tournaments and many inter-school and collegiate tournaments. The Mangalore Sports Club (MSC) is a popular organisation in the city and has been elected as the institutional member for the Mangalore Zone of the Karnataka State Cricket Association (KSCA) which is situated in Nehru Maidan.

Dakshina Kannada Football Association (DKFA), annually organizes the "Independence Day cup" on the occasion of Independence Day at Nehru Maidan. Various schools and colleges from across Dakshina Kannada, Udupi, Kodagu districts will be participating and the matches are conducted under seven categories.

The Mangaluru Smart City Limited has laid artificial turf at the football ground. The ground has been fenced. Interlock tiles have been laid along the fence.

== Sports Events ==
- Dakshina Kannada Football Association football league division (A) and (B)
- Independence Day cup football
- Indian Premiere league - Fan park

== Other Events ==
- Independence Day and Republic Day Parade
- Nehru Maidan's Ganesh Utsav
- Auto Expo
