= The Yenepoya School =

School in Karnataka, India

Location
- Mangaluru, Karnataka; India; 12.84917°N 74.846723°E

Information
- Type: CBSE

The Yenepoya School is a school situated in Mangaluru city of Karnataka in India. It is affiliated to the Central Board of Secondary Education (CBSE). A Centre of Excellence (CoE) for Robotics and Automation is present in this school.

== Facilities and Amenities ==
Some of the facilities offered by this school are as follows

- Physics Lab
- Chemistry Lab
- Biology Lab
- Swimming pool
- Gym
- Skateboarding ramp
- Bowling machine
- Music classes
- Dance classes
- Arts/craft classes
- Theatre classes
