= Vidyadayanee High School =

Vidyadayinee High School also spelled Vidyadayinee or Vidyadayini) is situated in the Surathkal locality of Mangalore in Karnataka, India. It was established by Hindu Vidyadayanee Sangha in 1944. It is one of the largest high schools in Dakshina Kannada and Udupi districts with more than 1000 students studying in classes 8, 9 and 10 (SSLC). It is affiliated with the SSLC board of Karnataka. The school is located east of NH-17 (renumbered NH-66) adjoining Govindadasa College. The school has its own building, large playground, library and laboratories. The Vidyadayinee High School has provided education to thousands of poor people from rural areas.

The school teaches in both Kannada and English.

The Hindu Vidyadayinee Sangha was founded by Iddya Krishnayya with an aim to safeguard the interests of Hindus during the British rule in the backdrop of conversion. The school initially started functioning in the backyard of Iddya Mahalingeshwara temple and slowly flourished into the existing campus, sprawling across acres of land.
