= I. M. Jayarama Shetty =

Indian politician (1951–2014)

Irmady Moodalakatte Jayarama Shetty

Member of Parliament, Lok Sabha
- In office 1998–1999
- Preceded by: Oscar Fernandes
- Succeeded by: Vinay Kumar Sorake
- Constituency: Udupi

Personal details
- Born: 1 May 1951; Moodalakatte, Udupi, Mysore State, India
- Died: 15 May 2014 (aged 63); Bangalore, India
- Political party: Bharatiya Janata Party
- Spouse: Vidya
- Children: 3

Irmady Moodalakatte Jayarama Shetty (1 May 1951 – 15 May 2014) was an Indian politician and member of parliament who represented Udupi of Karnataka in the Lok Sabha. He was a member of the Bharatiya Janata Party.

== Biography ==
Jayarama Shetty was born to Irmady Bhujanga Shetty and Moodalakatte Nagarathnamma. He attained a Bachelor of Engineering Degree from Manipal Institute of Technology, Manipal. He also served as member of the Karnataka Legislative Assembly from 1994 to 1998. He founded Moodlakatte Institute of Technology, Kundapura in the year 2004.

=== Political career ===
As member of the Bharatiya Janata Party (BJP), in 1994, Shetty was elected to the Karnataka Legislative Assembly from Byndoor. In the 1998 general election to the Lok Sabha, he successfully contested Udupi defeating Oscar Fernandes of the Indian National Congress. He unsuccessfully contested the 1999 election, losing to Vinay Kumar Sorake of the INC. After being denied the presidency of the Dakshina Kannada district unit of the BJP, he quit the party and joined Janata Dal (Secular) in April 2004. He then moved to Samajwadi Party, before joining the INC.

=== Death ===
Shetty died 15 May 2014, in a Bangalore hospital after a prolonged illness.
