= Pandeshwar =

- Residential & Commercial locality
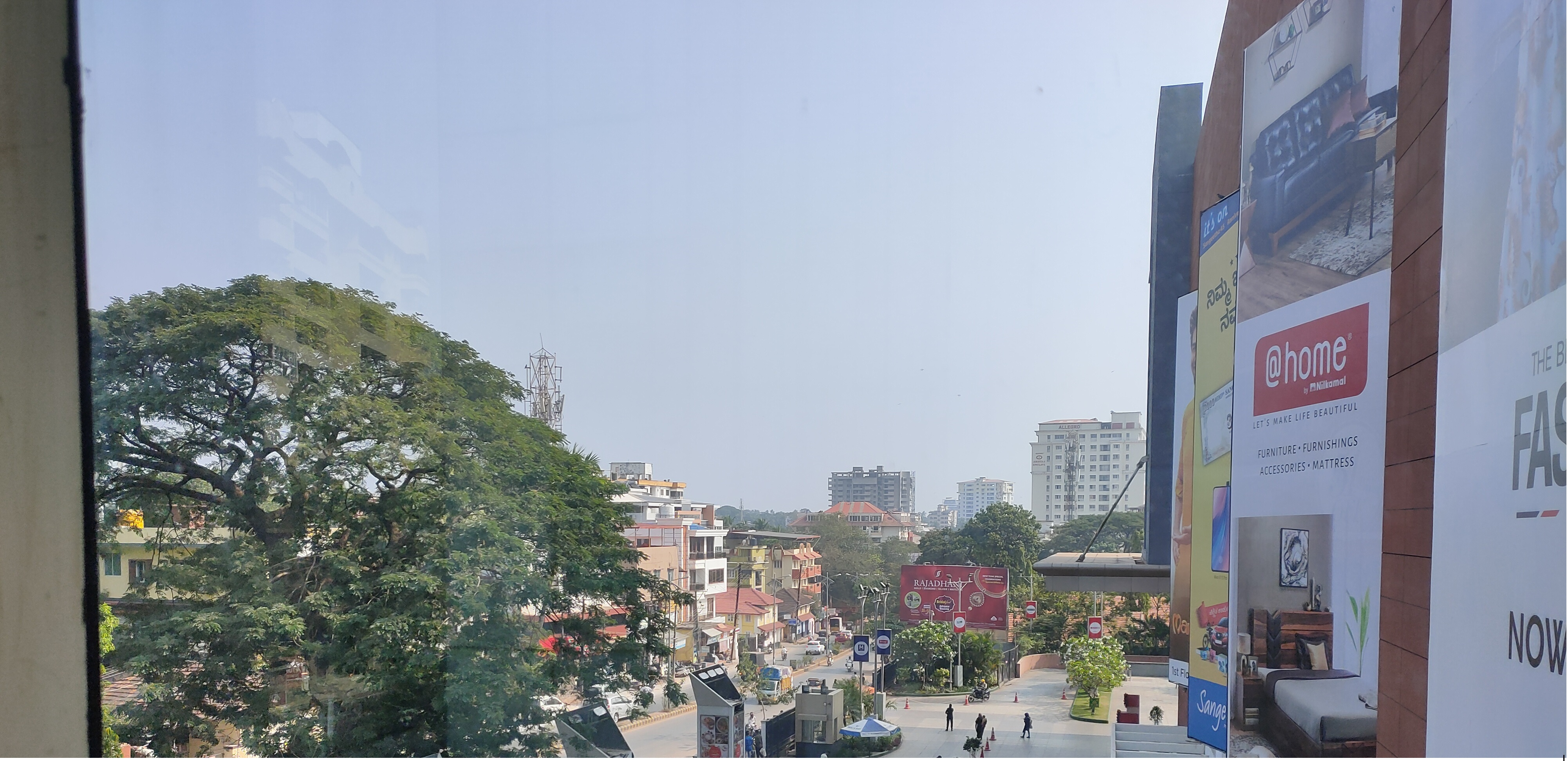
- Skylines of Pandeshwar from Forum Fiza Mall, Mangalore

- Location in Mangalore city, Karnataka, India
- Coordinates: 12.826470286224083°N 74.84798090380176°E
- Country: India
- State: Karnataka
- District: Dakshina Kannada
- City: Mangalore

Government
  - Body: Mangalore City Corporation

Pandeshwar is a residential and commercial locality in the city of Mangalore, Karnataka, India. It is one of the upscale residential, commercial, and financial centres of Mangalore. It houses some of the highrise buildings and many more under pipeline. It is close to Mangaladevi Temple, which is one of the well known temples of Mangalore. It is just half a mile away from the Mangalore Central railway station, Mangalore City Bus Stand and Nehru Maidan. Pandeshwar is surrounded by Hoige Bazaar, Yemmekere & State Bank.

The Zonal Office of Union Bank of India, formerly the Headquarters of the erstwhile Corporation Bank is located in this area.

The Forum Fiza Mall, the largest mall in Mangalore and one of the largest in India, is also located here. Pandeshwar houses some government offices as well.

== Gallery ==
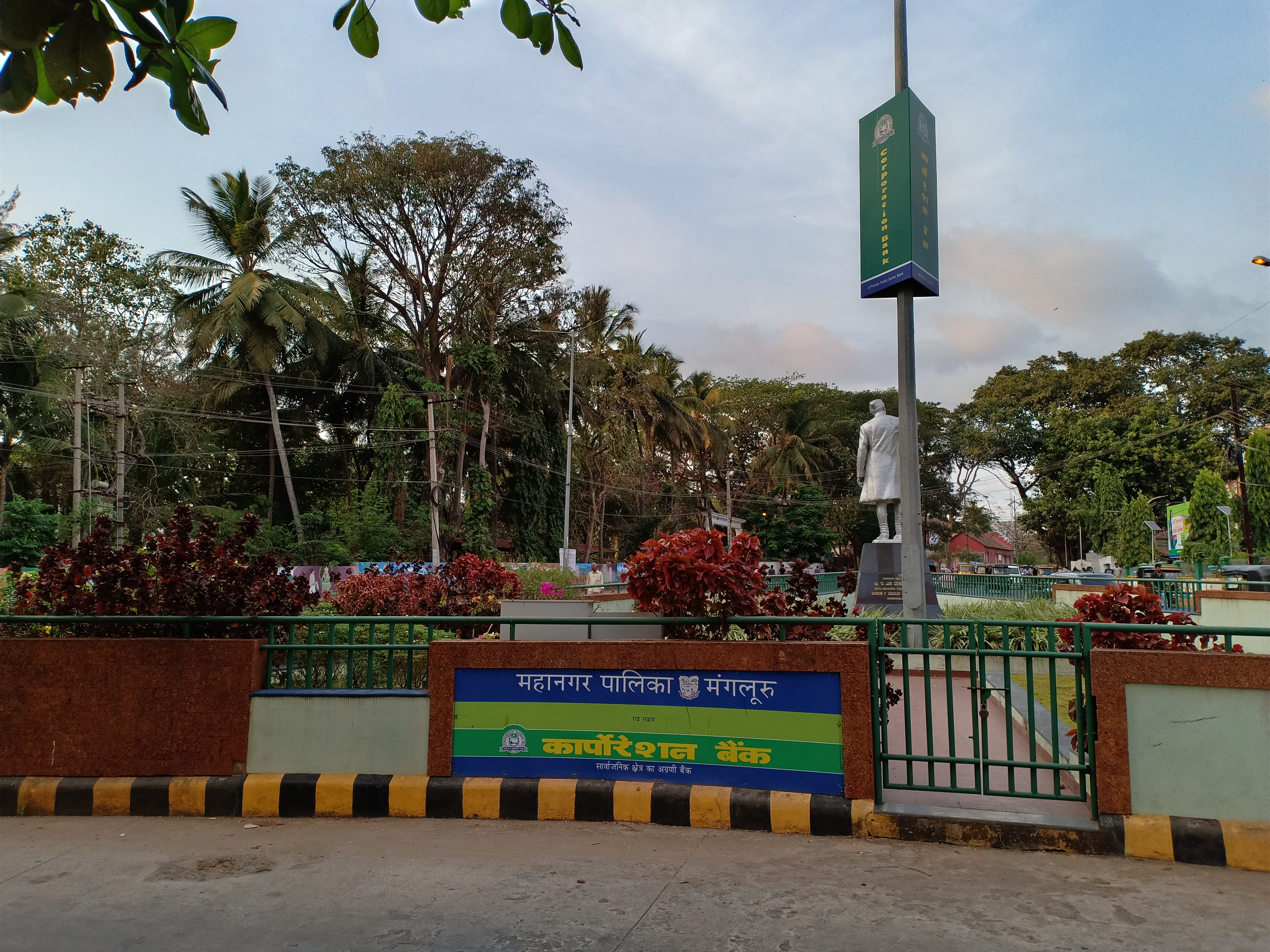
Corporation Bank Circle at Pandeshwar in Mangalore(Old Photo)

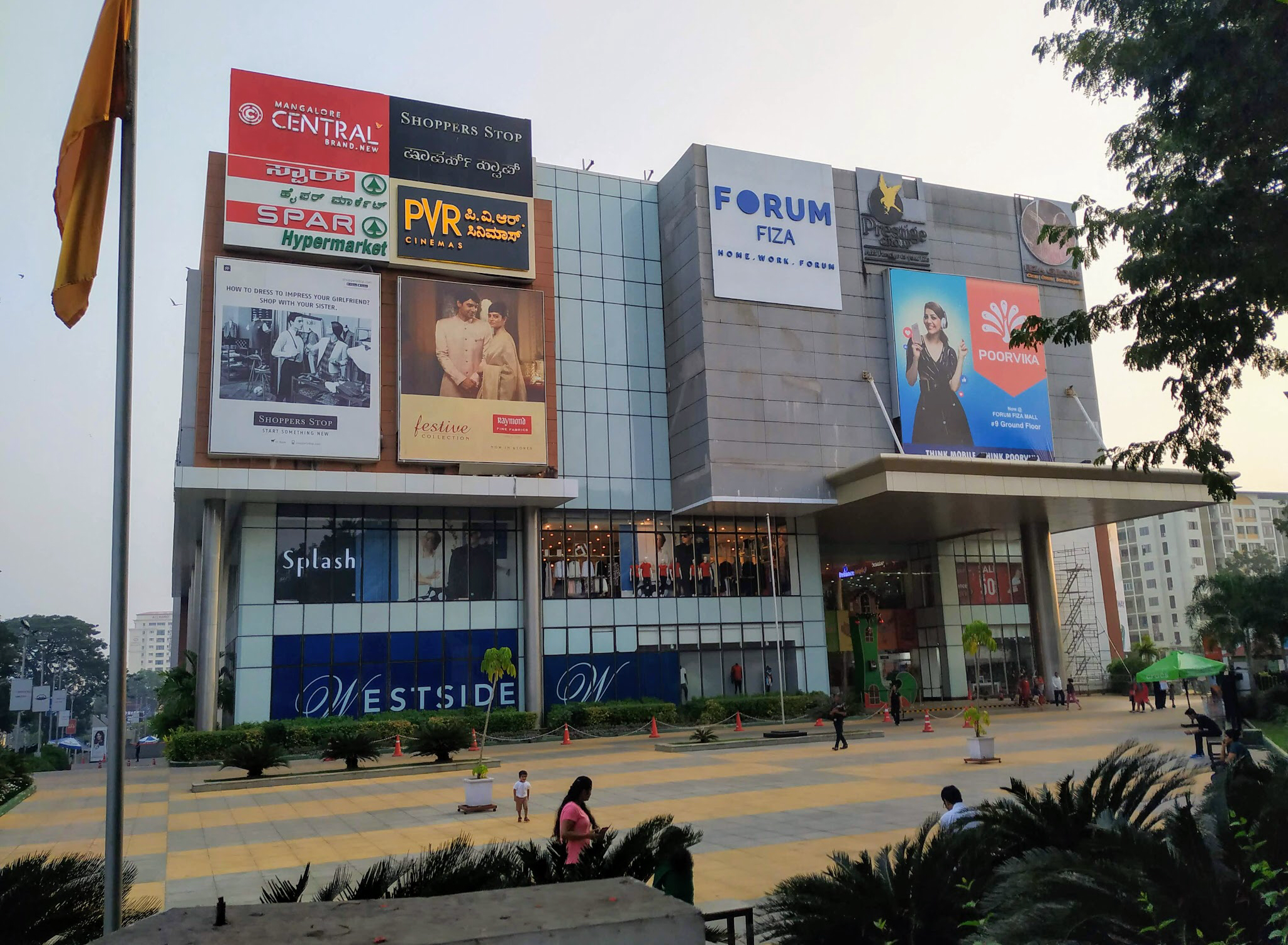
Fiza By Nexas Mall (Formerly Forum Fiza Mall) at Pandeshwar in Mangalore(Old Photo)

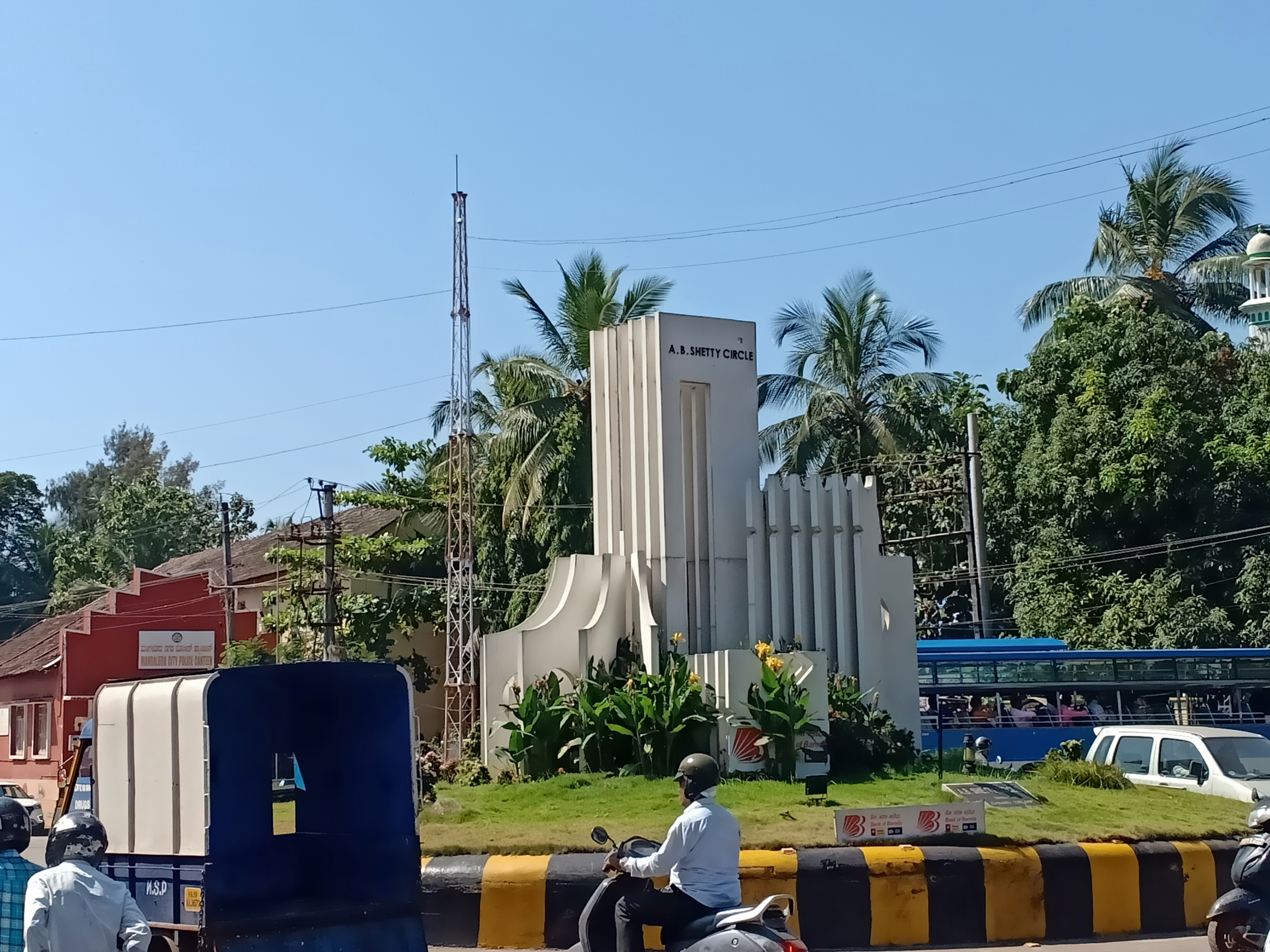
A B Shetty Circle at Pandeshwar in Mangalore(Old Photo)

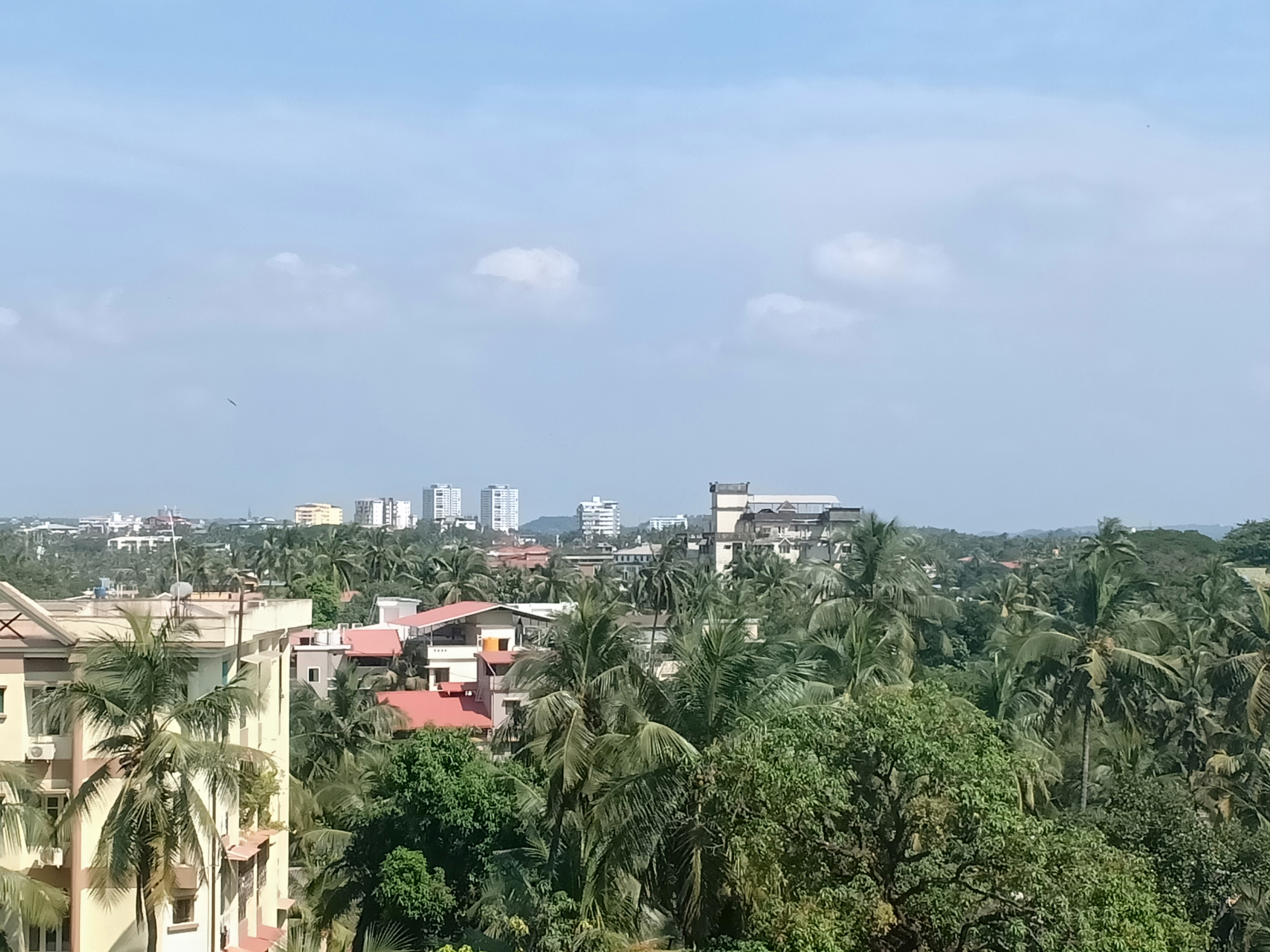
Panorama of Mangalore city viewed from the Forum Fiza Mall in Pandeshwar
