= Hampankatta =

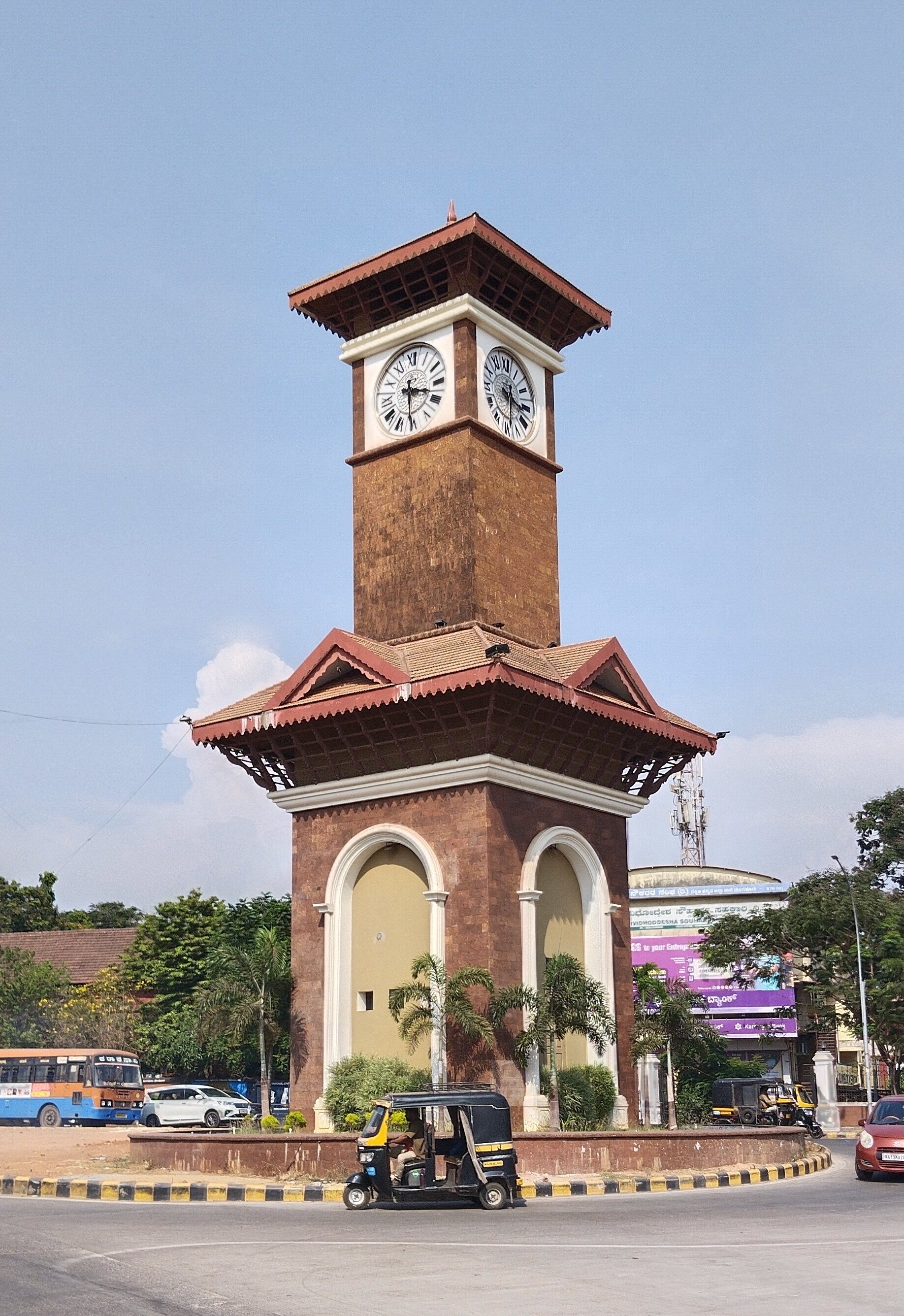
- Clock Tower circle, Hampankatta, Mangalore

- Location in Karnataka, India
- Coordinates: 12°50′23″N 74°47′24″E
- Country: India
- State: Karnataka
- District: Dakshina Kannada
- City: Mangalore

Languages
  - Official: Tulu, Kannada, English
- Time zone: UTC+5:30 (IST)

Hampankatta (also known as 'Hampanakatte' in Tulu and Kannada) is the centre of Mangalore City, Karnataka. Most of the public utilities are located here. Hampanakkatte was named by the British in 1920. Its original name was 'Appanakatte'. The town was named after a person called Appanna Poojary who constructed a 'well' in the region around 1900.

== Mangalore Central ==
Rail connectivity in Mangalore was established in 1907. Mangalore was also the starting point of India's longest rail route. The city has two railway stations, Mangalore Central (at Hampankatta) and Mangalore Junction (at Kankanadi). A metre gauge railway track, built through the Western Ghats, connects Mangalore with Hassan. The broad gauge track connecting Mangalore to Bangalore via Hassan was opened to freight traffic in May 2006 and passenger traffic in December 2007.

Mangalore is also connected to Chennai through the Southern Railway and to Mumbai via the Konkan Railway.

== Public utilities ==
- 1. Service Bus Stand : This bus stand is located adjacent to Nehru Maidan near StateBank. All private run express & shuttle buses to various places around Mangalore like Udupi, Kundapur, Kollur, Kasargod, Puttur, Karkala, Moodbidre, Shimoga, etc., start from this bus stand. Some of the KSRTC buses to BC road & Puttur also start from here.
- 2. City Railway Station: This station is now known as Mangalore Central Station. All trains having Mangalore as starting point start from this station. The trains which just pass through Mangalore will stop at Kankanadi (now known as Mangalore Junction) only. They do not come to Mangalore Central station.
- 3. Town Hall: This hall mainly hosts different cultural activities like Tulu dramas, Beary dramas, Yakshaganas, events of Rotaract club, weight lifting championships, etc.
- 4. RTO: Regional Transport office of Transport department, Government of Karnataka.
- 5. Nehru Maidan: This playground is open for common public. People play all kinds of games. This ground is also used for political rallies, Independence day/Republic day parades, circus, exhibitions, etc.
- 6. DC & Magistrate Office
- 7. PWD (Public Works Department) of Karnataka state government.
- 8. Central Market
- 9. City Central Library: This is located close to St Aloysius college. This library is run by the Mangalore city corporation. There are several branches for city central library within Mangalore.

== Hospitals ==
1. Wenlock Hospital: This is the largest hospital in Dakshina Kannada district run by the state government.
2. Lady Goschen Hospital

== Educational institutions ==
1. Milagres Pre-University College
2. University College
3. Dr.P.Dayananda Pai- P.Satisha Pai Government First Grade College, Carstreet
4. St. Aloysius group of Institutions
5. Kasturba Medical College
6. Milagres School

== Religious places ==
1. Sharavu Mahaganapati Temple
2. Kudroli temple
3. Milagres Church
4. St Aloysius Church
5. Idgha Masjid, built by Tippu Sultan.
6. Noor Masjid

== Places for leisure ==
1. Tagore Park
2. Townhall Park
3. Corporation Bank Park near Nehru Maidan
4. Nehru Maidan (for sports)
5. Central Talkies
6. City Central Library, Light House Hill
7. Ideal Ice cream parlour
8. City Centre Mall
9. Cinepolis Multiplex

== Gallery ==
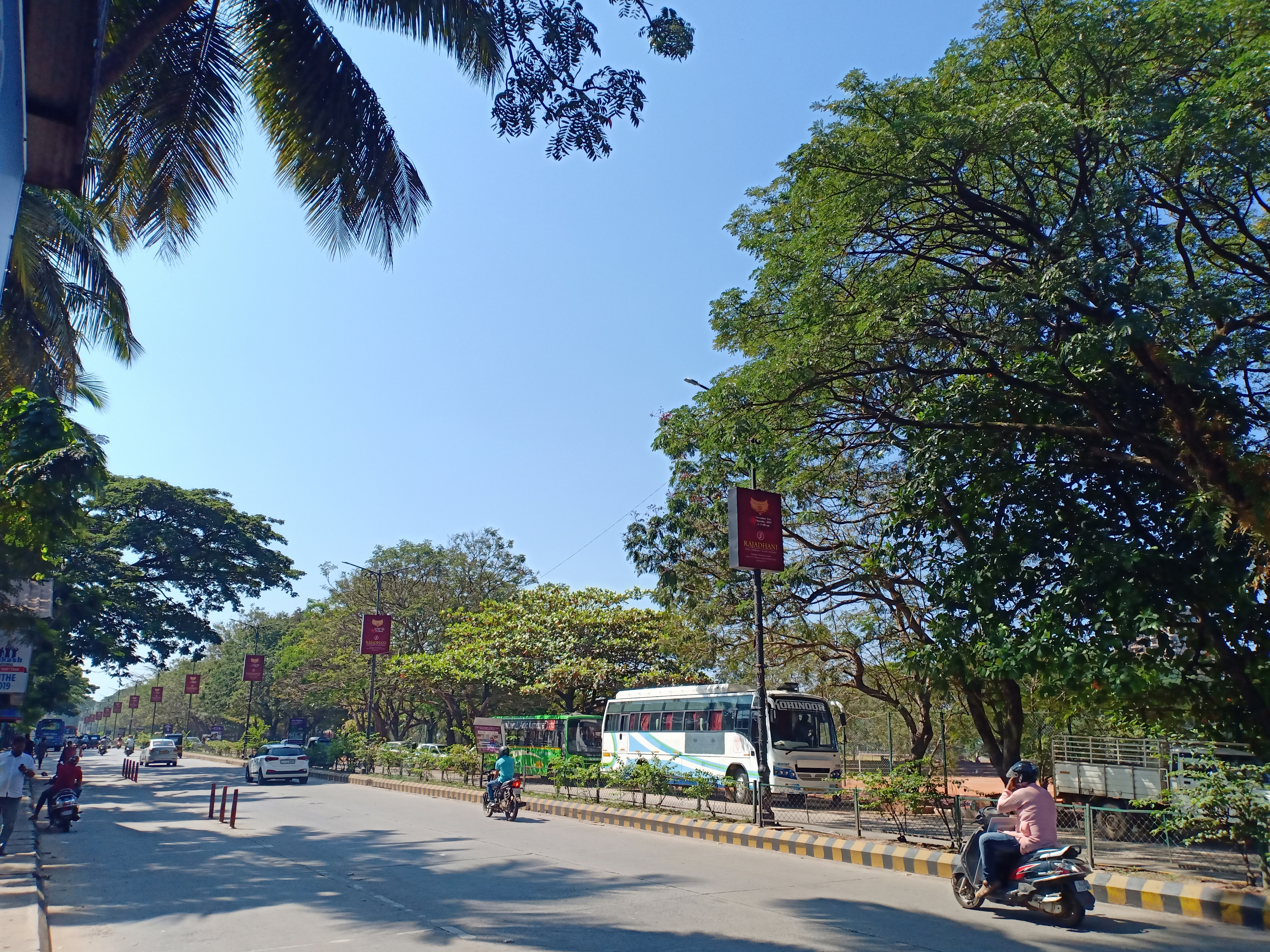
Road linking the Clock tower circle with Nehru Maidan

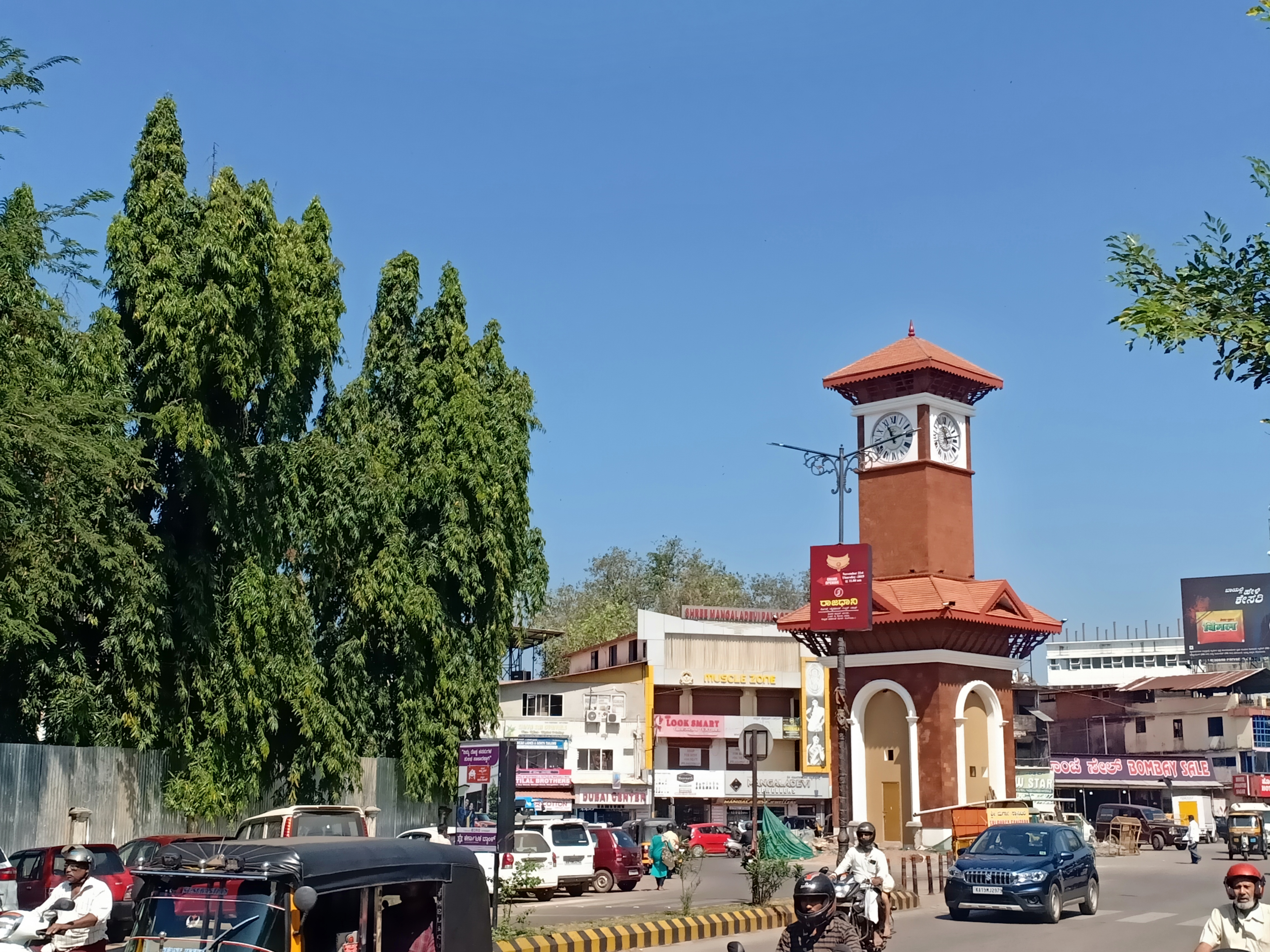
Clock Tower circle junction

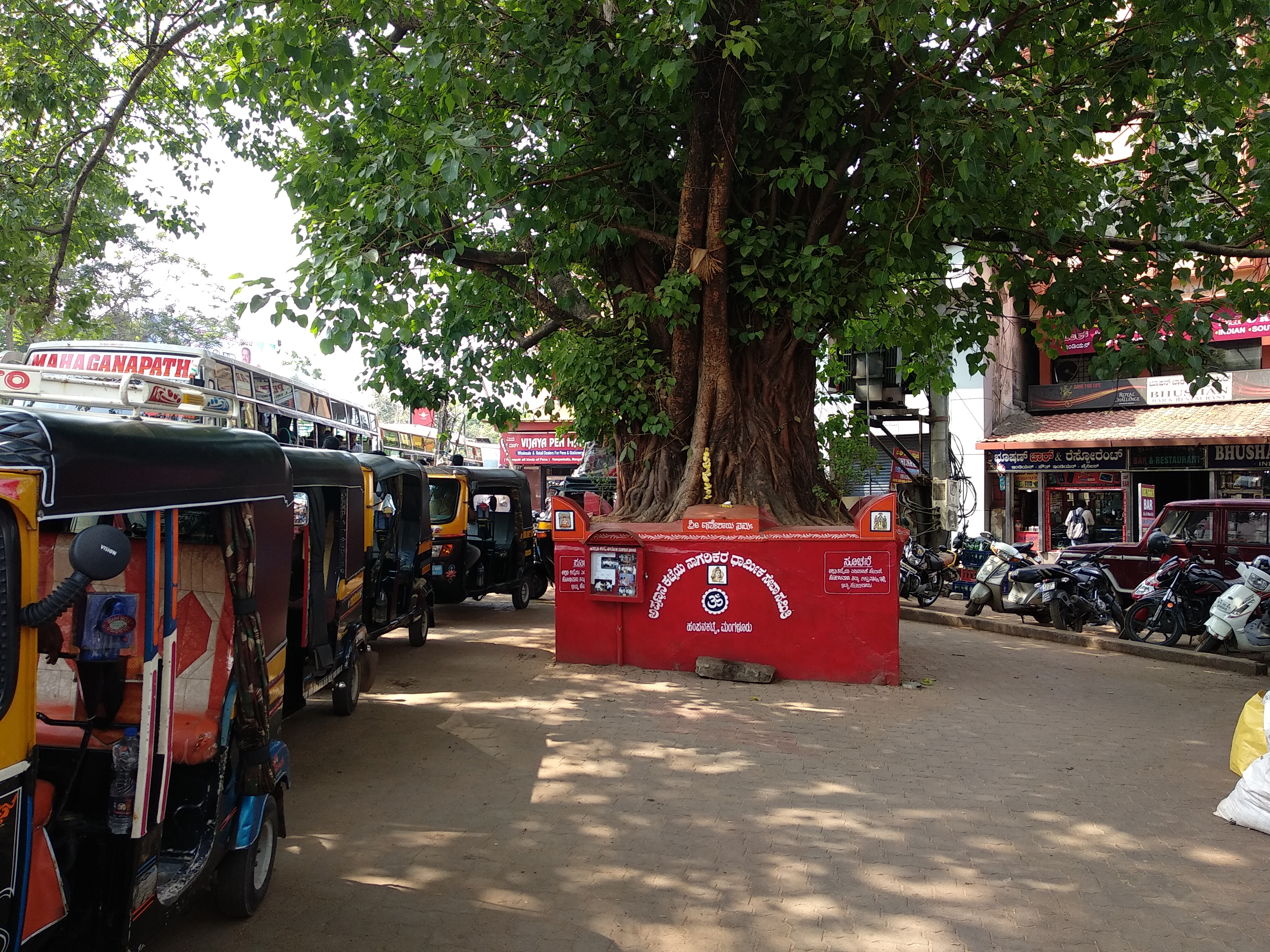
Appana Katte

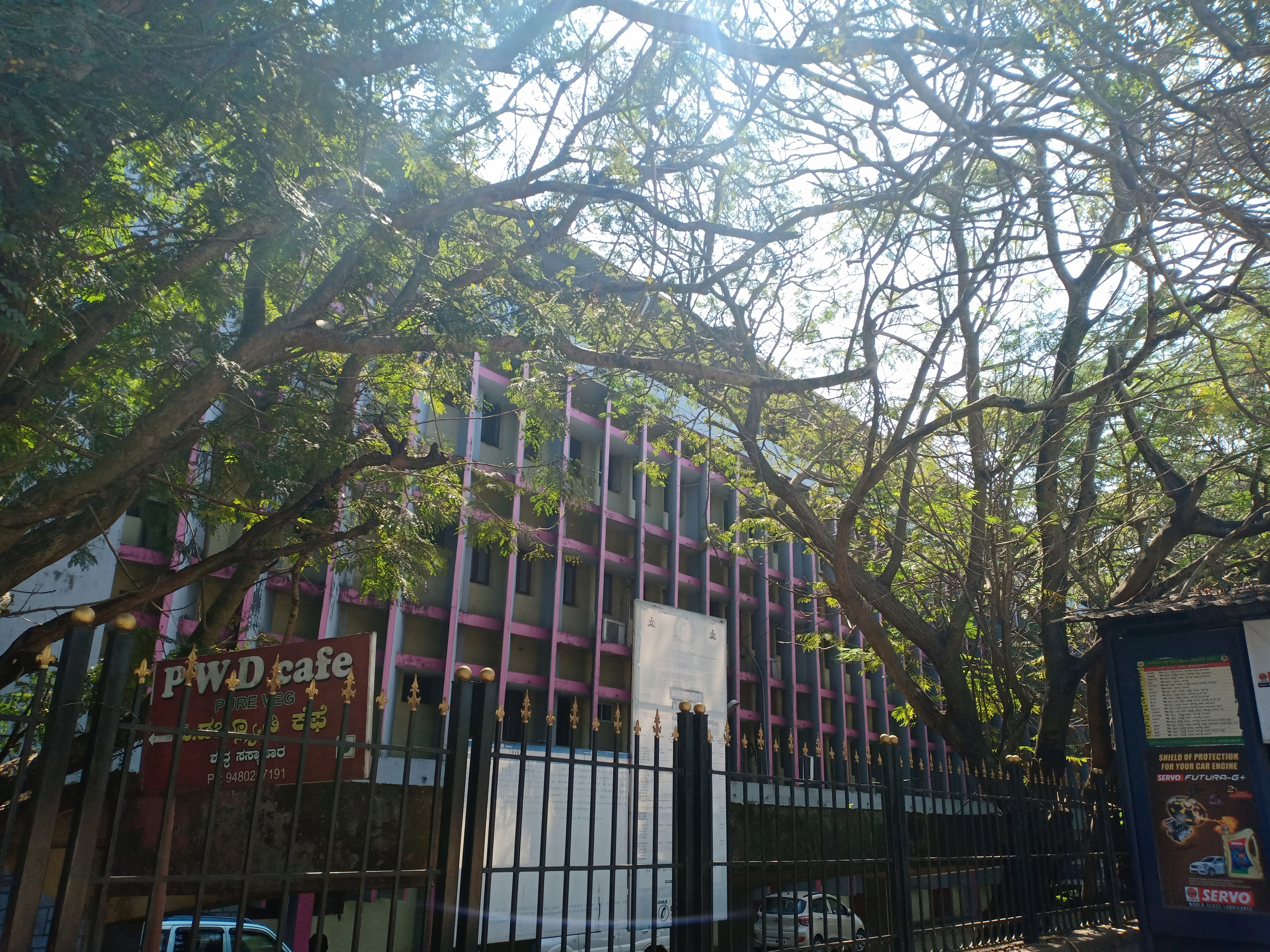
RTO and PWD office

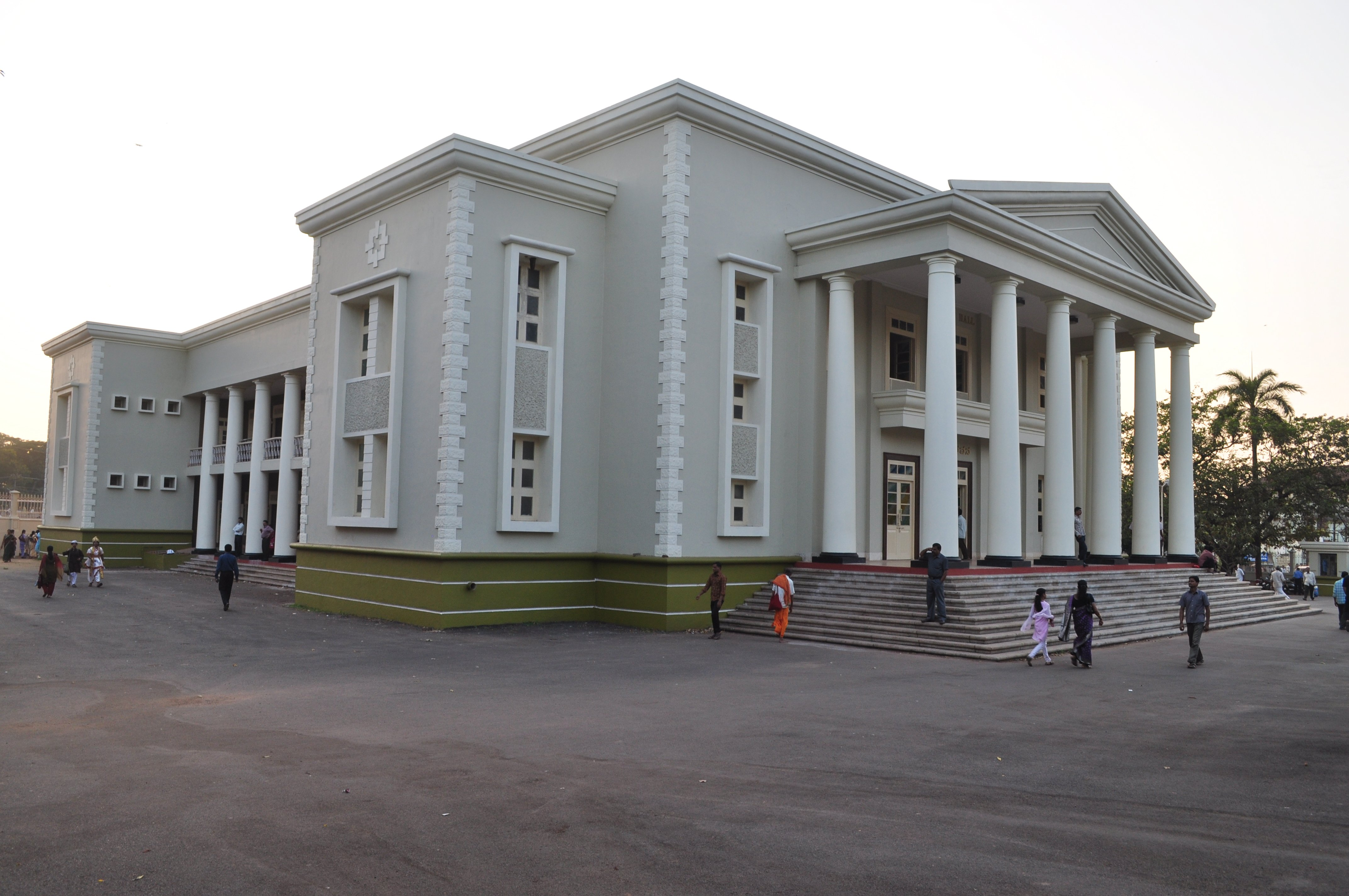
Town Hall

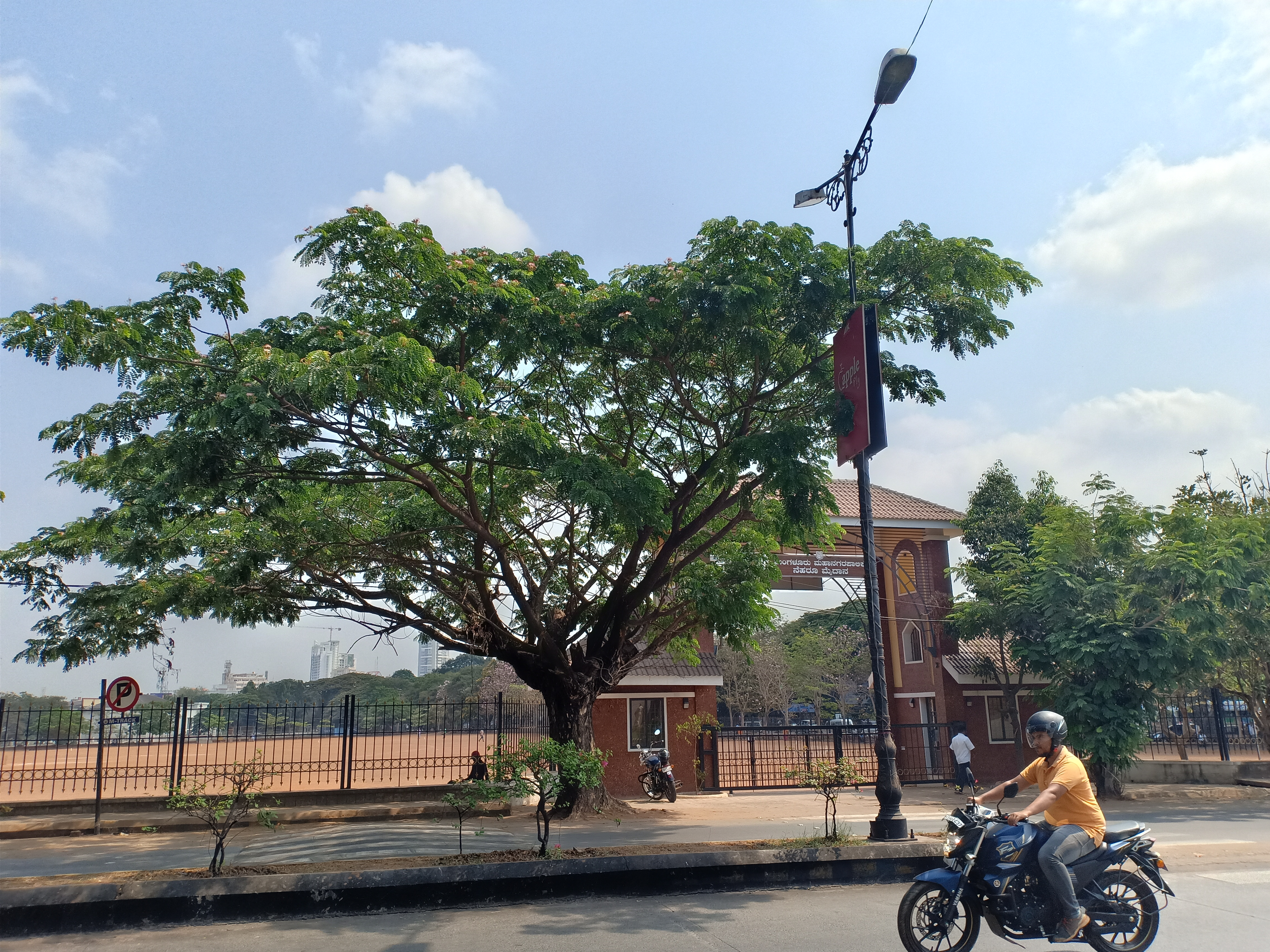
Near the entrance of Nehru Maidan
