= Mangalore University =

State University in Karnataka, India

Coordinates: 12°48′56.72″N 74°55′26.67″E

- Motto: Knowledge Is Light
- Type: Public
- Established: 1980; 46 years ago
- Affiliations: UGC, NAAC
- Chancellor: Governor of Karnataka
- Vice-Chancellor: P. L. Dharma
- Location: Konaje, Karnataka, India
- Campus: Urban
- Website: mangaloreuniversity.ac.in
- Location within Karnataka

Mangalore University (abbreviated as MU) is a public university located in Konaje, Mangaluru, in the Indian state of Karnataka, India. In 2021, the National Assessment and Accreditation Council (NAAC) awarded the university a ‘B’ grade.

As on 2024, Prof. P L Dharma took over the charge of the university as Vice Chancellor.

== History ==
Mangalore University was established in 1980 with jurisdiction over the districts of Udupi, Dakshina Kannada and Kodagu.

== Academics ==
Established with only three post-graduate departments, Mangalore University as of June 2026 has 26 post-graduate departments. Mangalore university has two constituent colleges, five autonomous colleges and more than 200 affiliated colleges. The university also has a post-graduate centre at Chikka Aluvara, Kushalanagar.

In the eighties, prestigious colleges such as the Regional Engineering College-Surathkal and the Manipal Institute of Technology were affiliated to and constituent colleges of Mangalore University. Mangalore University had a stellar reputation in the eighties and nineties. It continues to be a leading university in the Dakshin Kannada region even today. In 2023 Mangalore University went from A to B grade in NAAC University rankings.

In November 2026, the university decided to discontinue several BA and BSc subject combinations in government colleges in Udupi and Dakshina Kannada districts from the next academic year, citing low student enrolment.

== List of Vice Chancellors ==
- B. Sheik Ali, 1980–1985
- K. M. Safeeulla, 1985–1989
- M. I. Savadatti, 1989–1995
- S. Gopal, 1995–2001
- B. Hanumaiah, 2001–2005
- Thimme Gowda, 2005–2006 (acting)
- K. M. Kaveriappa, 2006–2010
- K. K. Achary, 2010 (acting)
- T. C. Shivashankara Murthy, 2010–2014
- K. Byrappa, 2014–2018
- Kishore Kumar, 2018 (acting)
- Ishwara P., 2018–2019 (acting)
- Kishore Nayak, 2019 (acting)
- P. Subrahmanya Yadapadithaya (2019–2023)
- P L Dharma (2024 -)

== Rankings ==
The university was ranked 151-200 overall in India by the NIRF (National Institutional Ranking Framework) in 2024.

University rankings

General – India
- NIRF (Overall) (2024): 151-200

== Research Centres ==
- Centre for Advanced Research in Environmental Radioactivity (CARER), an advanced centre for radioecological and radiation protection research with collaborations with many laboratories of the world.
- Centre for Application of Radioisotopes and Radiation Technology (CARRT), been established in collaboration with Department of Atomic Energy (DAE), Board of Research in Nuclear Sciences (BRNS) and Board of Radiation and Isotope Technology (BRIT).
- Microtron Centre
- NMR Instrument Centre
- DST-PURSE Research Facility
- Kanakadasa Research Centre

== Controversy ==
The University faces a severe financial crunch and is on the verge of closing down various courses. Religious festival celebrations under Acting vice-chancellor Jairaj Amin sparked widespread protests as students demanded that university remain a place for learning, not religion.

In January 2024 the Enforcement Directorate raided the office of the Vice Chancellor and registrar in connection with a Rs 150 cr recruitment scam in Kolar-Chikkaballapura District Co-operative Milk Producers Union Limited (KOMUL).

At the start of 2024 about 129 teaching posts remained vacant at the university. In a move to further hide transparency, the university syndicate decided to stop live streaming of meetings.

Due to poor resource management, the University is closing down multiple post graduate courses. Evening college courses have been discontinued. Facing multiple issues, the ABVP union created a protest forcing the university to address them.

== Notable alumni ==
- Satya Nadella, CEO & Chairman of Microsoft
- V. G. Siddhartha, Indian businessman and founder of Cafe Coffee Day
- D. V. Sadananda Gowda, Indian politician
- Veerappa Moily, Indian politician and writer
- KL Rahul, Indian international cricketer.
- Pruthvi Ambaar
