= St. Antony Church, Naravi =

- St. Antony Church, Naravi
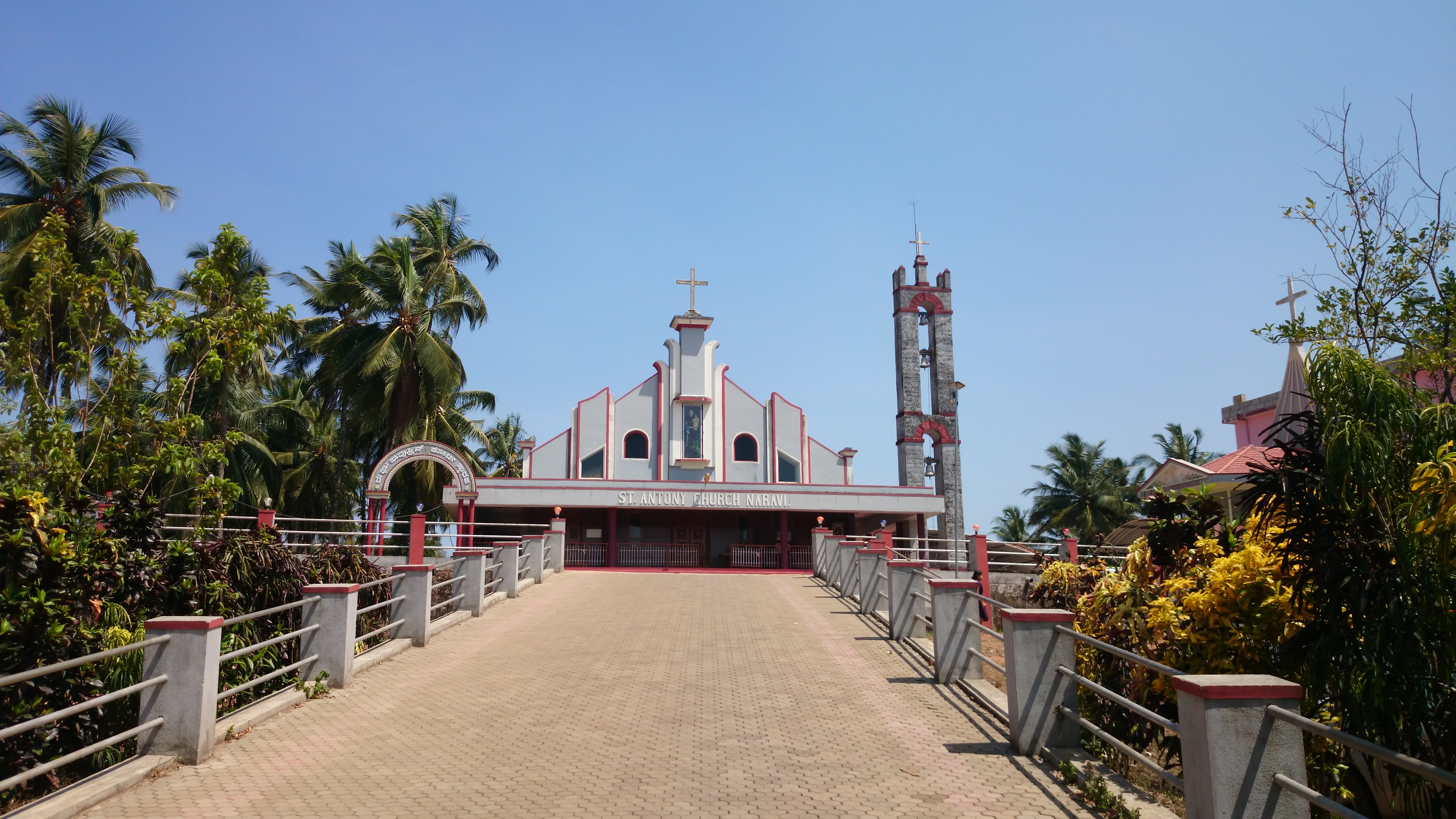
- St. Antony Church, Naravi view from the front

- Location in Karnataka
- 13.1202°N 75.1367°E
- Denomination: Roman Catholic (Latin rite)
- Website: http://www.stantonynaravi.com

History
- Founded: 1905

Administration
- Division: Belthangady
- District: Dakshina Kannada
- Archdiocese: Roman Catholic Archdiocese of Bangalore
- Diocese: Diocese of Mangalore
- Deanery: Deanery of Belthangady
- Parish: Most Holy Redeemer Church, Belthangady

Clergy
- Archbishop: Most Rev. Bernard Blasius Moras
- Bishop: Rev. Aloysius Paul DSouza
- Vicar: Rev. Fr. Simon D'souza

The St. Antony Church is a historic Roman Catholic Church located in Naravi, Belthangady Taluk. This church has century old history. Fr. Faustine Corti who was from Switzerland came to Naravi and served here from 1905 to 1926. This parish comes under Belthangady Varado which is a part of Roman Catholic Diocese of Mangalore.

== History ==
This church has more than 100 years of history. Around 1870, a small chapel was built in Naravi. Fr. Faustine Corti from Switzerland was then working at St. Aloysius College, Mangalore as professor came to Naravi in the year 1905 to serve the mission work. By looking at the situation and lifestyle of local Koraga people, Fr. Faustine Corti started the missionary work at Naravi and worked at the betterment of local people. He served the mission work here in Naravi from 1905 to 1926. Being a zealous priest though of a great caliber worked strenuously at naravi for 21 years. On 4 October 1911, then the bishop of Mangalore Diocese, Rev. Fr. Paolo Carlo Perini visited Naravi and surprised to see the improvements in the area and with great happiness, he appreciated Fr. Faustine Corti for his efforts. Not only this, because of tremendous efforts of Fr. Faustine Corti for the betterment of Koraga people, the state civil department awarded him with Kaisar-i-Hind Medal.

In 1913, another missionary Rev. Fr. Gaviragi appointed as assistant to Fr. Corti. But within few days Fr. Gaviragi moved to Aladangady for the mission work. Due to the increased number of people visiting Fr. Corti for consultation, then small office was converted into a big house. In 1918, another mission Rev. Fr. Jiyaro was sent as an assistant to Fr. Faustine Corti to help him in his missionary work. Due to the increased number of Christians, Fr. Faustine Corti decided to build a church because the small chapel was not enough to cater the needs of local people. In 1923, with the efforts of Rev. Fr. Jiyaro, the foundation work for a new church was started. But because of some inconvenience, the construction work was postponed to 1929. Without regarding his health Fr. Faustine Corti worked for the improvements of the localities for 21 years and died on 9 October 1926.

After the death of Fr. Faustine Corti, Fr. Jiyaro continued the construction work. 10 years later in 1928 Fr. Jiyaro was transferred to Calcutta. In 1929 Fr. Gaviragi who was working as missionary at Aladangady and Badyar came to continue the construction work of Naravi church and even after great difficulty he finished the work in next one year. On 7 May 1930 then Vicar General V. R. Fernandes blessed the church. After this old chapel was converted into school.

== Demographics ==
The parish has 255 families with a population of 1350 members as of November 2015.

== Administration ==
The educational institutions at Naravi are a platform for many of students for their future life. Among then few are below.

- St. Paul's Primary Kannada Medium School
- St. Paul's English Medium School
- Naravi High School
- St. Antony PU College
- St. Antony College of Commerce
- St. Antony Hostel
- St. Paul Orphanage
- St. Gerosa Convent

Apart from this, the Catholics of this church have started many associations to help the society.

- Catholic Sabha
- Women's Association
- ICYM(Indian Catholic Youth Movement)
- YCS (Young Christian Students)
- Altar Children Sodality
- Choir Group
- Small Christian Community
- Marian Sodality
- Legion of Mary
- St Vincent de Paul Society
- Secular Franciscan Order
- Catechism Association
- Eucharistic Ministry
- St. Monica Sodality
- Holy Childhood

== See also ==
- Roman Catholicism in Mangalore
- Goan Catholics
- Deanery of Belthangady
- Most Holy Redeemer Church, Belthangady
- Church Higher Primary School, Belthangady
- Church Of Sacred Heart Of Jesus, Madanthyar
- Monsignor Ambrose Madtha
- Christianity in Karnataka
- Diocese of Belthangady
- St. Antony Church, Ujire
- Syro-Malankara Catholic Eparchy of Puttur
