= Belthangady Varado =

Deanery of Belthangady
- Mangalore East Varado
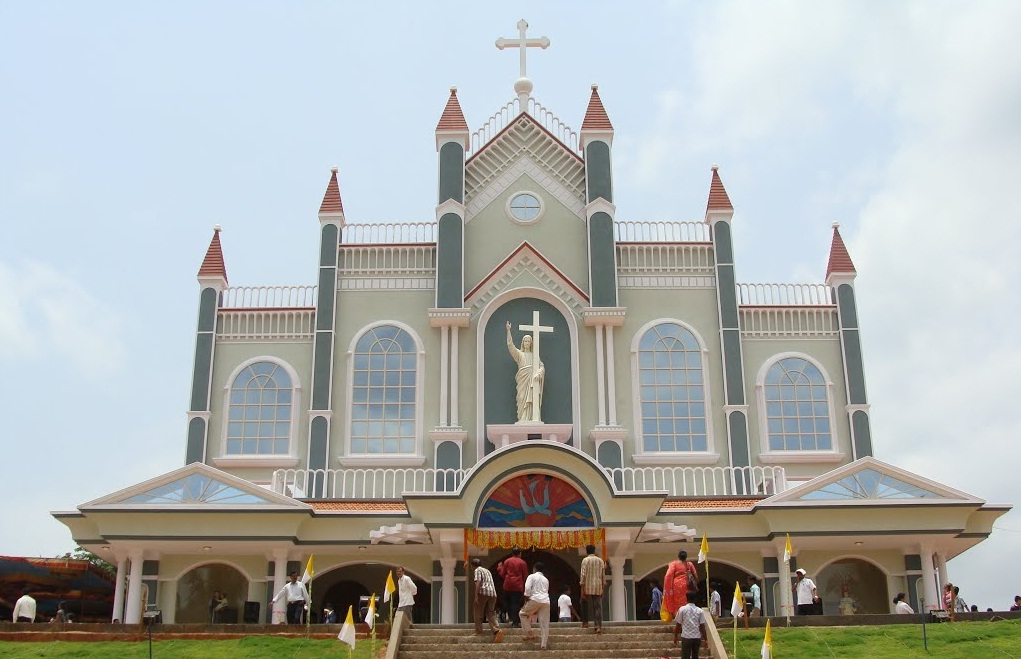
- Belthangady Varado Church

- Location within Karnataka
- 12°59′37″N 75°16′08″E
- Denomination: Roman Catholic (Latin rite)

Administration
- Division: Belthangady
- District: Dakshina Kannada
- Province: Roman Catholic Archdiocese of Bangalore
- Archdiocese: Archdiocese of Bangalore
- Diocese: Roman Catholic Diocese of Mangalore
- Archdeaconry: Diocese of Mangalore
- Deanery: Belthangady Varado
- Parish: Most Holy Redeemer Church, Belthangady

Clergy
- Archbishop: Most Rev. Peter Machado
- Bishop: Most Rev. Peter Paul Saldanha
- Vicar: Rev. Fr. Joseph Cardoza

The Deanery of Belthangady or Belthangady Varado is one of the deaneries which comes under Diocese of Mangalore located at Belthangady, Karnataka, India. This deanery consists of 10 parishes and Most Holy Redeemer Church (Belthangady) is the primary parish for this Deanery. Fr. Joseph Cardoza is the current vicar of this Deanery.

== History ==
In 1908, Fr. Piadade D’Souza constructed a new church. Fr. Clifford Dsouza constructed the new parochial house in 1982. Fr. Gregory Dsouza built a chapel at Charmadi. On 10 August 1939, Fr. John G. Pinto established a chapel at Bangady(Indubettu), which became a parish later. Arva(Aladangady), Indubettu and Naravi parishes were carved out of Belthangady. Fr. Rosario Fernandes extended the church.

Being located near Jamalabad Fort, built by Mysore ruler Tippu Sultan, this church has a history of more than 125 years. It is a testimony of Christians who sustained faith despite the atrocities of Tippu Sultan. The martyrdom of around eight hundred Christians inspired the faithful to lead a life centered on Christian values. The struggle of Christians and attacks on Churches by Tippu Sultan is now hidden from history due to political reasons to show Tippu Sultan as a hero in southern part of Karnataka.

== Demographics ==
This Deanery consists of 10 parishes and Most Holy Redeemer Church (Belthangady) is the primary parish for this Deanery.

== Parish churches ==
Listed below are the parishes of Belthangady Varado.

- St. Peter Claver Church, Aladangady(Arva)
- St. Raphael Church, Badyar
- Most Holy Redeemer Church, Belthangady
- St. Francis Xavier Church, Indabettu
- Church Of Sacred Heart Of Jesus, Madanthyar
- St. Francis Assisi Church, Nainad
- St. Antony Church, Naravi
- St. Antony Church, Ujire
- Christ the King Church, Venur
- St. Ann's Church, Nala - Mavinakatte

== See also ==
- Roman Catholicism in Mangalore
- Goan Catholics
- Most Holy Redeemer Church (Belthangady)
- Church Higher Primary School, Belthangady
- St. Theresa High School, Belthangady
- Monsignor Ambrose Madtha
- Christianity in Karnataka
- Diocese of Belthangady
- Syro-Malankara Catholic Eparchy of Puttur
