= Church of Most Holy Saviour, Agrar =

Agrar Church
- Church Of Most Holy Saviour, Agrar
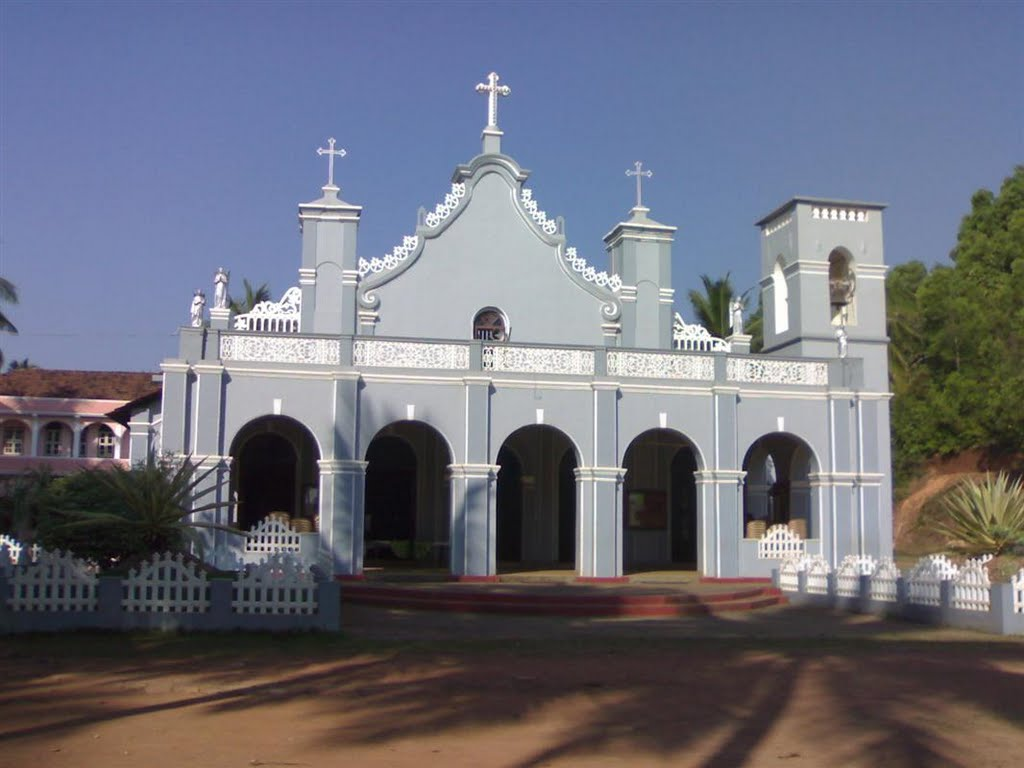

- Location within Karnataka
- 12.9145°N 75.0521°E
- Location: Bantwal, Dakshina Kannada district, Karnataka
- Denomination: Roman Catholic (Latin rite)

History
- Founded: 1702

Architecture
- Style: Baroque

Administration
- Province: Roman Catholic Archdiocese of Bangalore
- Diocese: Roman Catholic Diocese of Mangalore
- Parish: Church of Most Holy Saviour

Clergy
- Archbishop: Peter Machado
- Bishop: Peter Paul Saldanha
- Vicar: Rev. Fr. Dr Peter D’Souza

The Church of Most Holy Saviour also known as Agrar Church is a historic Roman Catholic Church situated in Bantwal, India. The church was built in 1702, but it is believed that the existence of church was prior to this. It is one of the oldest churches in Dakshina Kannada district. This church comes under Roman Catholic Diocese of Mangalore. At present Rev. Fr. Dr Peter Dsouza serves as the parish priest of the Most Holy Saviour Church.

== History ==
Agrar means the village of Brahmins and is derived from the Kannada word Agrahara. Once the most extensive parish of the Diocese of Mangalore, extending from Bantwal to Charmadi borders and from the Nethravathi river to the Gurupur river, it is certain that the Agrar church existed even prior to the founding of the Bantwal church in 1702 by Fr. Miguel Dmello. There are no records available to show the exact date of the origin of the church at Agrar. Fr. Jose da Costa was the Vicar at Agrar in 1751. Tipu Sultan had demolished the first church. It was rebuilt on the same foundation after the return of the Christians from the captivity. No chronological list of the parish priests prior to 1801 is available. The church was rebuilt, expanded, and renovated by Fr. Camil Baretto in 1889. Br Moscheni S.J., artistically painted its sanctuary in 1902. Fr. R.F.C. Mascarenhas built the presbytery in 1914. The church has been renovated on the occasion of the tricentenary of the founding of the parish in 2002.

Over time, several new parishes were carved out of this once extensive parish:

- Most Holy Redeemer Church, Belthangady – 1885
- Church of the Sacred Heart of Jesus, Madanthyar – January 1893
- St. Patrick Church, Siddakatte – 1 May 1926
- St Thomas the Apostle Church, Nirkan – 25 May 1930
- St Antony Church, Allipade – 22 May 1938
- Our Lady of Loretto Church, Bantwal – 1 November 1939
- Our Lady Of Velankanni Church, Farla – 8 December 1994

== Institutions ==
The Agrar parish manages and runs two Schools known as Agrar Church Higher Primary School, Holy saviour English medium higher and lower primary school. The church used to run Christa Jyoti High School was established in 1984.

They also manage Holy Saviour Hall which was inaugurated in 2018. At present christa Jyoti high school is shutdown.

== Demographics ==
The parish has 311 families with a population of 1,492 members as of September 2011.

== Significance ==
Being one of the oldest church, Agrar church is also famous for many organizations which started under the supervision of church administration. St. Ann's Convent at Agrar, St. Ann's of Bangalore Convent at Agrar, Agrar Church Primary School, Holy Saviour English Medium School and Christa Jyothi High School are administered and supported by Agrar Church.

Most Holy Redeemer Church, Belthangady is the daughter church of this parish.

The church is built in the Baroque architecture style. Its frescos and paintings on the altar are beautiful and well renowned showing Jesus sitting with his Apostles and clearly portraying the artistic touch of Br. Antonio Moscheni, who also painted the St. Aloysius Chapel in Mangalore in the style of Sistine Chapel in Vatican City.

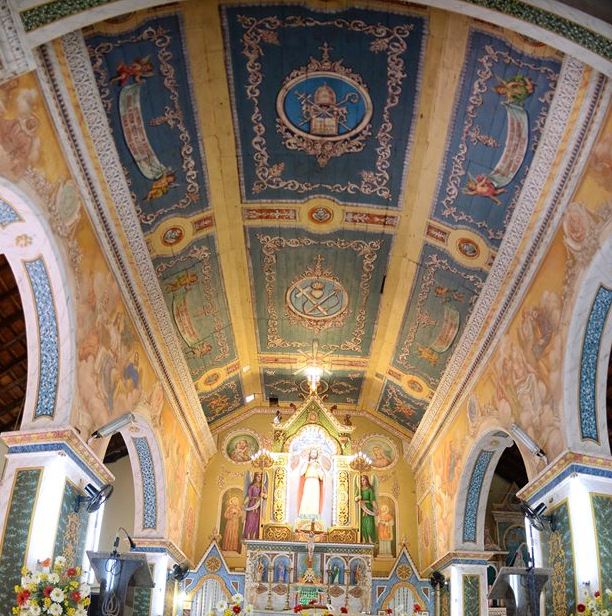
Frescos and Paintings on the sanctuary of the church painted by Bro. Antonio Moscheni in the year 1902

== People ==
The parish has been famous as the place of origin for a large number of priests and nuns. The notable ones are as follows:

- Rev. Dr. Aloysius Paul D'Souza, Bishop of Mangalore Diocese
- Rev. Dr. Gerald Isaac Lobo, Bishop of Udupi Diocese
- Rev. Dr. Pius Thomas D'Souza, Bishop of Ajmer

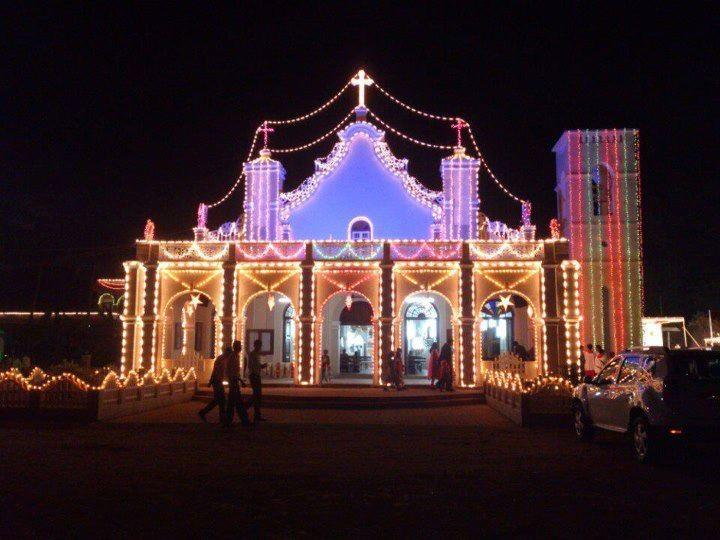
Agrar Church during Christmas (front view)

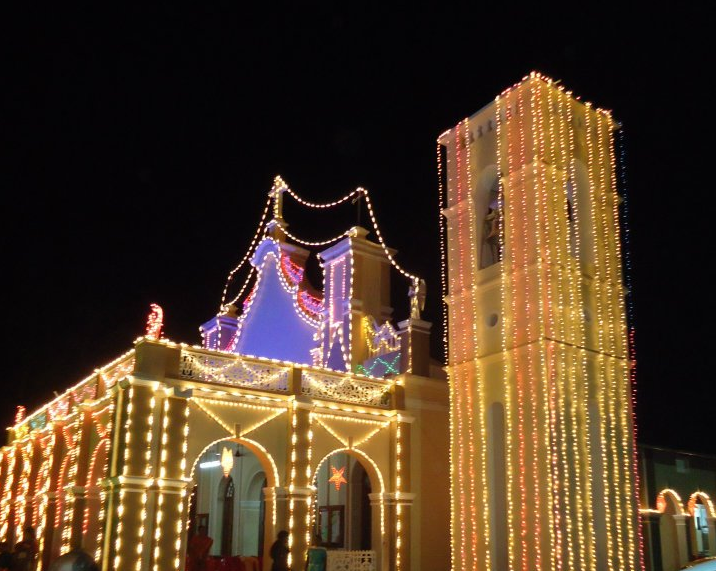
Agrar Church during Christmas (side view)

== See also ==
- Roman Catholicism in Mangalore
- Goan Catholics
- Deanery of Belthangady
- Most Holy Redeemer Church, Belthangady
- St. Patrick Church, Siddakatte
