= St. John the Baptist Church, Permude =

- Location in Karnataka
- 13°00′52″N 74°52′21″E
- Location: Permude, Mangalore Taluk, Dakshina Kannada district, Karnataka
- Denomination: Roman Catholic (Latin rite)

History
- Founded: 24 October 1965
- Consecrated: 16 May 1963

Administration
- District: Dakshina Kannada
- Archdiocese: Roman Catholic Archdiocese of Bangalore
- Diocese: Diocese of Mangalore
- Parish: St. John the Baptist Church, Permude

Clergy
- Archbishop: Most Rev. Bernard Blasius Moras
- Bishop: Rev. Aloysius Paul Dsouza
- Vicar: Rev. Fr. Edwin Vincent Correa

The St. John the Baptist church is a Roman Catholic Church situated in the locality of Permude, Mangalore taluk, India. This church is located on the way to Kateel from Bajpe. The church is devoted to St John the Baptist who is known for truth and justice.

== History ==
In early days, most of the people in Permude were farmers and hard workers. Agriculture and dairy farming were the occupations of the people here during the early years. Permude had a nickname as Perda Mudde (Tulu Language) as production of milk was plenty during early time. Prior to foundation of this church the Catholics around Permude were part of Bajpe and Kalavaru. For spiritual needs, Catholics of Permude were walking several miles to Bajpe or to Kalavaru as there were no other transport facility available. Meanwhile, the Catholic community realized the need of a church in Permude. During this time, John Baptist Balthazar Nazareth, a resident of Permude and by profession a coffee planter in Chikmagalur became sick. His wife Seraphine Nazareth vowed to build a church in Permude to get back her husband's good health and started the construction of the church along with her daughter Juliana and her son-in law Albert Ambudias Rodrigues. Three-fourths of the cost of the construction was shared by the founders and a quarter of the cost was borne by the parishioners by donating material and labour.

The foundation for the church was laid on 25 November 1959 by the Bishop late Rev Dr Raymond D' Mello. The church was consecrated on 16 May 1963; as per the official records in the Roman Catholic Diocese of Mangalore, Permude parish was officially formed on 24 October 1965 after separating from Bajpe and Kalavaru parishes. Father Jacob Crasta was the first priest of this church.

The church was devoted to St John the Baptist who is known for truth and justice as it was built in the memory of John Baptist Balthazar Nazareth. Until Kateel parish was formed, this parish served the spiritual needs of Catholics around Permude, Kateel and Ekkaru. When Kateel parish was formed in 1971, the Catholic families from Kateel to Ekkaru joined Kateel parish. This parish has given several priests and nuns who have served the spiritual needs of the community.

The parish celebrated its golden jubilee on 13 January 2016.

== Demographics ==
The parish has 180 families with a population of 826 members as of November 2015.

== Administration ==
Since its inception, thirteen parish priests have served here. Their names are as below.

- Fr. Jacob S Crasta
- Fr. Edwin Pinto
- Fr. Hilary Sanctis
- Fr. Henry Fernandes
- Fr. Vernon Vas
- Fr. Denis Moras Prabhu
- Fr. Victor George Dsouza
- Fr. Peter Theodore Dsouza
- Fr. Richard Lasrado
- Fr. Oswald Lasrado
- Fr. Valerian Rodrigues
- Fr. Edwin Vincent Correa (parish priest and vicar)
- Fr Gregory Serrao (parish priest and vicar in 2022)
- Fr Ronald Pinto(2023 onwards

== See also ==
- Roman Catholicism in Mangalore
- Goan Catholics
- Deanery of Belthangady
- Christianity in Karnataka
- Most Holy Redeemer Church, Belthangady
- St. Patrick Church, Siddakatte
