= Most Holy Redeemer Church, Belthangady =

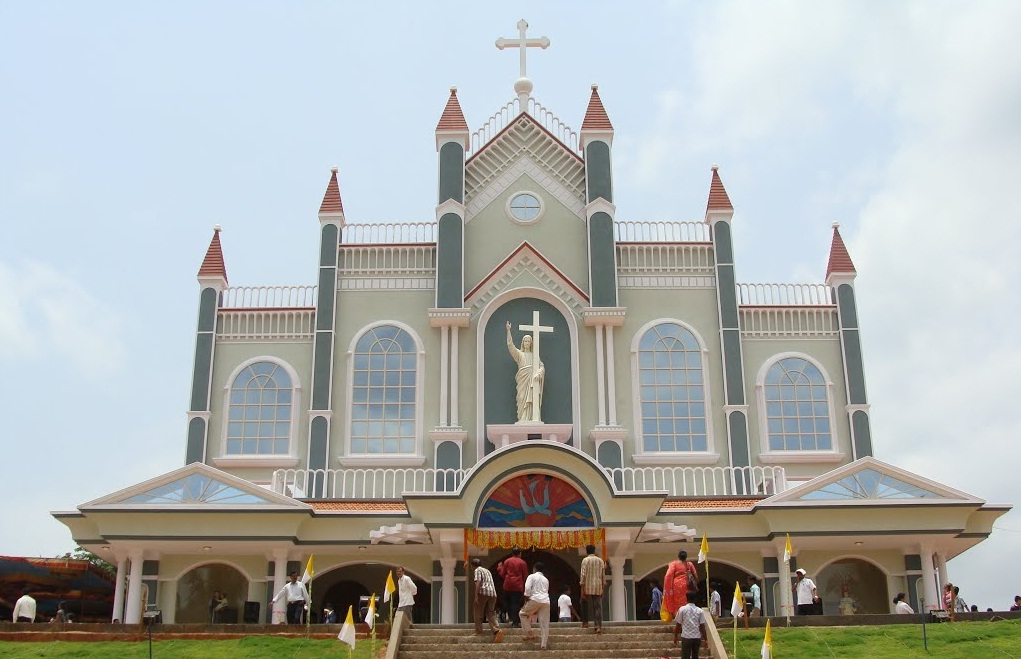
- Most Holy Redeemer Church view from the front

- Location within Karnataka
- 12.9935°N 75.2687°E
- Location: Belthangady, Dakshina Kannada district, Karnataka
- Denomination: Roman Catholic (Latin rite)

History
- Founded: 1885

Architecture
- Architect: Lawrence Cutinha (Contractor: Melvin Correa)

Administration
- District: Dakshina Kannada
- Archdiocese: Roman Catholic Archdiocese of Bangalore
- Diocese: Diocese of Mangalore
- Deanery: Deanery of Belthangady
- Parish: Most Holy Redeemer Church, Belthangady

Clergy
- Archbishop: Most Rev. Peter Machado
- Bishop: Rev. Peter Paul Saldanha
- Vicar: Rev. Fr. Walter Dmello

The Most Holy Redeemer Church is a historic Roman Catholic Church situated in the locality of Belthangady, India. The current structure of the church was built in 2012 during the tenure of Fr. James Dsouza. The original structure was constructed near the site of the present-day church building. It is one of the oldest churches in Belthangady. This parish comes under Belthangady Varado which is a part of Roman Catholic Diocese of Mangalore.

== History ==
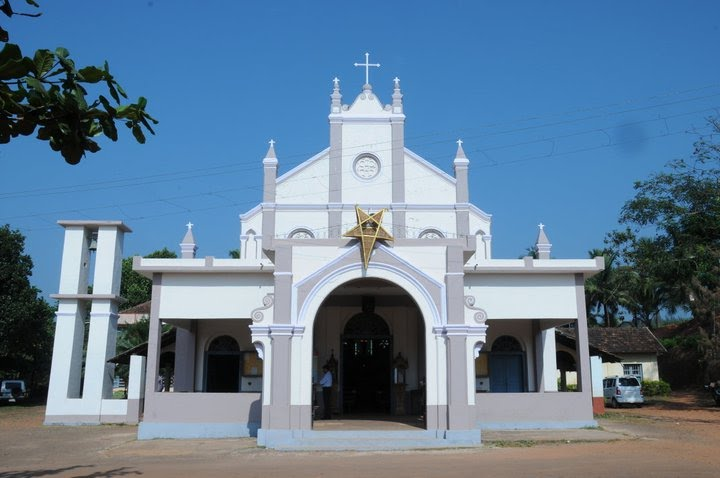
Old church structure which was built around 1894 and demolished in December 2012

This first structure of the church came into existence around 1885 and the current church is the third structure. The two older structures were demolished. In 1682, when Maratha King Sambhaji invaded Goa, some Catholic families fled from Bardez in Goa, to a place called Gaddai, Athyadka and began residing there. In about 1870, Fr. Vaz constructed a chapel here. Originally a part of Agrar Church, the chapel was served from there. During the Goa-Verapoly controversy, some families seceded from Agrar Church and built a small chapel at Gaddai, a village at the foot of the rock fortress Jamalabad. As Athyadka was malaria-prone, the chapel was abandoned in 1890. Fr. Pascal Mascarenhas constructed a thatched chapel at Belthangady. It was pulled down to make way for a stable structure and a temporary church built adjoining the presbytery served for nearly 10 years. This was served from Taccode for some time. There were many Christian officers at Belthangady who helped Fr. Mascarenhas to get a plot.

In 1908, Fr. Piadade D’Souza constructed a new church. Fr. Clifford Dsouza constructed the new parochial house in 1982. Fr. Gregory Dsouza built a chapel at Charmadi. On 10 August 1939, Fr. John G. Pinto established a chapel at Bangady(Indubettu), which became a parish later. Arva(Aladangady), Indubettu and Naravi parishes were carved out of Belthangady. Fr. Rosario Fernandes extended the church.

The centenary celebrations were held during 1985 when Fr. Henry Machado was the parish priest. As the 2nd church building was more than hundred year old and too small to accommodate the present population, the parish assembly had decided to construct the new spacious church together with presbytery and a belfry. The estimated cost of the project is rupees 3 crore rupees. The post-centenary silver jubilee of Holy Redeemer Parish was held on the same day with inauguration of the present church building.

Being located near Jamalabad Fort, built by Mysore ruler Tippu Sultan, this church has a history of more than 125 years. It is a testimony of Christians who sustained faith despite the atrocities of Tippu Sultan. The martyrdom of around eight hundred Christians inspired the faithful to lead a life centered on Christian values. The struggle of Christians and attacks on Churches by Tippu Sultan is now hidden from history due to political reasons to show Tippu Sultan as a hero in southern part of Karnataka.

== Demographics ==
The parish has 622 families with a population of 2,902 members as of September 2011.

== Significance ==
St. Theresa High School was begun by Fr. Elias P. Dias on 1 June 1965. The nuns of Ursuline Franciscan Congregation are teaching at St. Theresa Composite Pre University College that belonged to the parish with student strength of 638 and 31 teachers. They are also engaged in social service, helping the poor, and counselling the troubled families. St. Theresa High School also run by the same nuns of Ursuline Franciscan Congregation.

Fr. John G. Pinto started a primary school at Belthangady. Fr. Rosario Fernandes constructed the new school building in 1949. Holy Redeemer Kannada Medium School has a student's strength of 750 and English Medium School has 210. The community gathering, ward-wise programmes that are organized regularly in the parish strengthen the parishioners' bond. The institutions run under this parish are one of the top in Belthangady. The parish has units of Catholic Sabha, Franciscan Third Order, Pompeii Sodality, rice fund, wedding fund, burial fund, St Vincent de Paul Society, YCS, Legion of Mary, Choir group, Altar boys and also self-help groups promoted by the parish to empower the financially weaker parishioners.

The papal envoy to Ivory Coast, Archbishop Dr Ambrose Madtha, who died in an accident at Ivory Coast, were buried in the church on 15 December 2012, with nearly 3,500 people in attendance. The funeral mass was led by Apostolic Nuncio of India Salvatore Pennacchio with bishop of Mangalore Dr. Aloysius Paul Dsouza as the concelebrant.

== Administration ==
23 priests had served Belthangady parish till 2015. Among them Fr. Albert Pinto served the parish for 16 years and reached out to Malayali parishioners living in far-flung villages of Charmadi, Neriya, Thotattady and neighbouring villages and covered several miles on bicycle in order to serve their spiritual needs by offering Holy Mass in Malayalam.

Fr. Elias P. Dias was a zealous priest who served the parish for seven years. He opened St. Theresa Girls High School as he believed that women empowerment begins with education. The nuns of the Ursuline Franciscan Congregation were entrusted with the duties of managing the school. Later St. Theresa Girls High School changed to co-education and changed the name to St. Theresa High School. Fr. E. P. Dias was the first priest at the newly set up parish in Ujire, about 6 km from Belthangady parish, and instrumental in setting up Anugraha Education Institution in Ujire.

Fr. Victor Pinto was the first assistant priest appointed by diocesan authorities in 1960.

Fr. Lawrence Dsouza served as 21st parish priest and during his time Fr. Nelson Olivera served as assistant parish priest.

Fr. Gerald Dsouza served as the 23rd parish priest.

Fr. James Dsouza, an energetic priest is serving as the 23rd parish priest at Belthangady during his tenure; the current church was built for the cost of 3.5 crores rupees. He is the guiding force to celebrate post centenary silver jubilee celebrations with pomp and gaiety along with Fr. Paul Prakash serves as the 20th assistant parish priest.

24th serving priest at this parish was Fr. Bonaventure Nazareth who had won the parishioners' heart.

Currently, Fr. Joseph Cardoza is serving as the parish priest and Fr. Jason Monis is the principal of Holy Redeemer English Medium School.

== Current structure ==
The new church was built at a cost of Rs. 3.5 crore and the parishioners offered 15000 voluntary man hours thereby contributing Rs. 30 lac in this regard. A new bell weighing 450 kg (990 lb) was imported from Italy in addition to the bell weighing 50 kg (110 lb) that was earlier imported from France are mounted in the belfry. The new bell was donated by a local donor.

== See also ==
- Roman Catholicism in Mangalore
- Goan Catholics
- St. Theresa High School, Belthangady
- Deanery of Belthangady
- Church Higher Primary School, Belthangady
- Church Of Sacred Heart Of Jesus, Madanthyar
- Monsignor Ambrose Madtha
- Christianity in Karnataka
- Diocese of Belthangady
- St. Antony Church, Ujire
- Syro-Malankara Catholic Eparchy of Puttur
