= St. Antony Church, Ujire =

Latin Catholic church in India

- Location in Karnataka
- 13.0030°N 75.3396°E
- Location: Ujire, Belthangady, Dakshina Kannada, Karnataka
- Country: India
- Denomination: Catholic Church
- Sui iuris church: Latin Church

History
- Founded: 1885

Architecture
- Completed: 1969

Administration
- District: Dakshina Kannada
- Archdiocese: Roman Catholic Archdiocese of Bangalore
- Diocese: Diocese of Mangalore
- Deanery: Deanery of Belthangady
- Parish: Most Holy Redeemer Church, Belthangady

Clergy
- Vicar: Rev. Fr. Joseph Mascarenhas

St. Antony Church is a Catholic church in Ujire, within the Belthangady Varado of the Diocese of Mangalore, India.

As of October 2021, the parish had 261 families and 1097 members. The current church was built in 1969.

== Administration ==
The church has sponsored several notable institutions in Ujire.

- Anugraha English Medium School (Kindergarten, Primary, and High Schools)
- Anugraha PU College
- Dayalbagh Ashram
- Vimukthi Social Work Centre
- Mary Immaculate Convent

== See also ==
- Goan Catholics
- Church Of Sacred Heart Of Jesus, Madanthyar
- Christianity in Karnataka
- Diocese of Belthangady
- Most Holy Redeemer Church, Belthangady
