= Surya Sadashiva Temple =

Temple in India

Surya Sadashiva Temple is located in Nada village of Dakshina Kannada Karnataka round about 12 km from Belthangady taluk center and 4 km from Ujire town.

The Surya temple is probably only one of its kind because of its unique tradition of clay offerings which symbolizes man's Earthly desires. The devotees along with their clay offerings have to go to the temple preferably on Mondays along with a coconut and a kg of rice. After a thorough examination of the idol the priest accepts the offerings on behalf of God. All the offerings are placed in a circular shaped pile near the temple which consists clay models of Children, cradles, limbs, houses, automobiles, coconuts, cattle, bullock carts, snakes, tortoise, eyes, ears etc...

== History ==
According to Mr.Laurie Honko, world-famous folklore expert from Finland the present age of the temple can be roughly guessed as about 1200 years with the help of his analysis and also with the guidance of folk literature.

== Popularity ==
This small temple located in a remote village of Dakshina Kannada District was little known, until a special news report aired by a local news channel highlighted the religious importance and sanctity of this place. Whereas many devotional places have expensive offerings being specified by the temples and the priests, you can impress this god by just offering a structure made of clay, in return to fulfilling your wishes. The clay structures to be offered once your wishes are fulfilled and what other than the actual clay offerings made by devotees lying in the temple, can give you the evidence of sanctity of this deity. You can make a wish either by visiting the temple or sitting at your home. Once your wishes are fulfilled, all you need to offer is a small idol or doll made of clay that replicates or represents what you wished for. For instance, if you wish for a child, you can offer the replica of a cradle or the small doll that represents the child.

One can find thousands of tiny clay idols and structures being offered to god lying near a small place near the temple, which is believed to be the original place where lord Sadashiva Rudra appeared and blessed his devotees.

There are replicas of multistory buildings, cows and calves, cradle, couple, cars, currency notes, even computers and gadgets lying, which are offered by devotees, whose wishes are fulfilled.
