= Kuvettu =

- village
- Location in Karnataka, India Kuvettu (India)
- Coordinates: 12.99°N 75.27°E
- Country: India
- State: Karnataka
- District: Dakshina Kannada
- Taluka: Belthangadi

Government
  - Type: Panchayati raj (India)
  - Body: Gram panchayat

Population (2011)
  - Total: 7,266

Languages
  - Official: Kannada
- Time zone: UTC+5:30 (IST)
- ISO 3166 code: IN-KA
- Vehicle registration: KA
- Website: karnataka.gov.in

Kuvettu is a census town in the southern state of Karnataka, India. Administratively it is under Beltangadi taluk of Dakshina Kannada district in Karnataka.

There is one town, Kuvettu, and one village, Odilnala, in the Kuvettu gram panchayat

== Demographics ==
As of 2001 India census, Kuvettu had a population of 6,035 with 2,955 males and 3,080 females.

As of 2011 census Kuvettu reported a total of 7,266 inhabitants.

== See also ==
- Mangalore
- Belthangady taluk
- Dakshina Kannada
