= Ilanthila =

- Village
- Location in Karnataka, India Ilanthila (India)
- Coordinates: 12.99°N 75.27°E
- Country: India
- State: Karnataka
- District: Dakshina Kannada
- Talukas: Beltangadi

Government
  - Body: Gram panchayat

Population (2011)
  - Total: 5,552

Languages
  - Official: Kannada
- Time zone: UTC+5:30 (IST)
- ISO 3166 code: IN-KA
- Vehicle registration: KA
- Website: karnataka.gov.in

Ilanthila is a village in the southern state of Karnataka, India. It is located in the Beltangadi taluk of Dakshina Kannada district.

== Demographics ==
As of 2011 India census, Ilanthila had a population of 5552 with 2725 males and 2827 females.

== See also ==
- Mangalore
- Dakshina Kannada
- Districts of Karnataka
