= St. Patrick Church, Siddakatte =

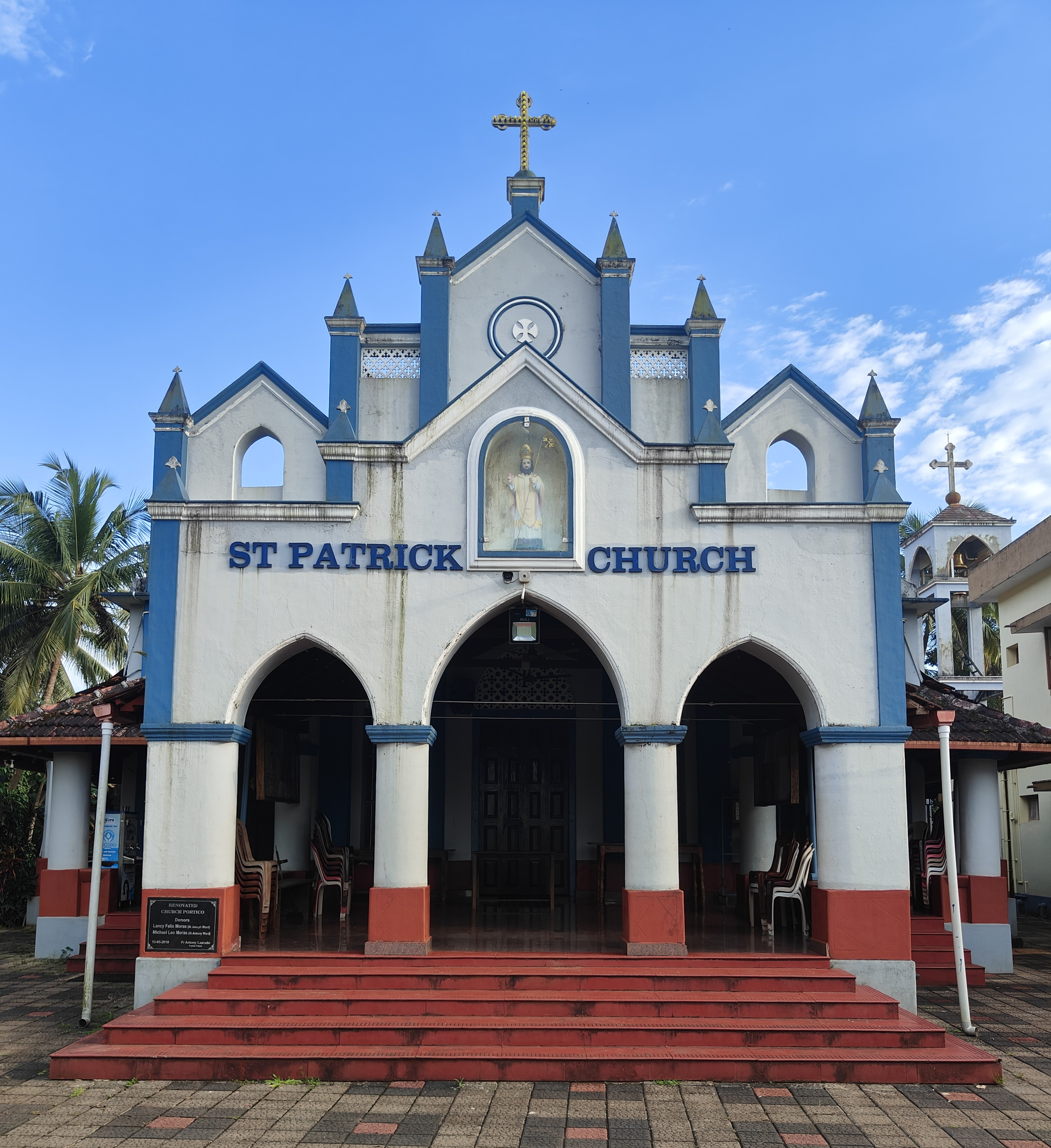
- St. Patrick Church, Siddakatte

- Location in Karnataka
- 12°59′26″N 75°03′00″E
- Location: Siddakatte, Bantwal, Dakshina Kannada District, Karnataka
- Denomination: Roman Catholic (Latin rite)

History
- Founded: 1926
- Events: After years of struggle, finally in 1820, under the able leadership of Joseph Baretto, this land was received as a gift from the Company to erect the first Roman Catholic church of North Kolkata. On 9 February 1822, the foundation stone of St. Patrick's Church was laid.

Administration
- District: Dakshina Kannada
- Archdiocese: Roman Catholic Archdiocese of Bangalore
- Diocese: Diocese of Mangalore

Clergy
- Archbishop: Most Rev. Bernard Blasius Moras
- Bishop: Rev. Aloysius Paul DSouza
- Vicar: Rev. Fr. Antony Lasrado

The St. Patrick Church is a Roman Catholic Church situated in the locality of Siddakatte, Bantwal. The church was built in 1926. This church comes under Roman Catholic Diocese of Mangalore.

St. Patrick’s Church is situated about 35 km from Mangaluru, beyond Agar, in a naturally beautiful and serene hill area known as Siddakatte. Surrounded by scenic hills and greenery, the church stands attractively amidst nature and is dedicated to St. Patrick.

The church, established in 1926, completed 100 years in 2026. While celebrating this centenary, it is important to recall and preserve the history and traditions of Siddakatte Parish over the past hundred years.

During the 18th century, under the rule of Tipu Sultan of Mysore, Christians in the Mangaluru region suffered severe persecution. Many Christians were forcibly taken to Srirangapatna, where they endured imprisonment and hardships for nearly 15 years until Tipu Sultan’s death. Many died due to hunger, illness, and torture, while only a few survived.

After their release, several Christian families returned and gradually resettled in different areas. Some families came and settled in Siddakatte, along with people of other communities such as Brahmins, Bunts, and Jains, living together peacefully. Initially, Siddakatte came under Agar Parish, which itself originated from the older parish, Ponnagol (Agrar) in Bantwal taluk, Mangaluru. Due to the vast area of Agar Parish—covering places like Belthangady, Madanthyar, Nirkan, Loretto, and Siddakatte—and due to difficulties in travel, there arose a strong need for a separate parish church in Siddakatte.

== Early History ==
Originally, Siddakatte belonged to Agar Parish. The first settlers showed deep faith and devotion. In 1906, about 4 acres of land were acquired at Surjabail (later called Salvadorbetta), where a small chapel and school were constructed. Later, during the tenure of Fr. Raymond F. C. Mascarenhas (also the founder of the Bethany Congregation), additional land measuring 12.5 acres was purchased on 01-11-1913 at Siddakatte with the intention of building a church. Though initial plans faced obstacles, the beauty and suitability of the hill encouraged further efforts. In 1924, under Fr. Reginald Pinto, construction of the chapel at Siddakatte began. Despite financial difficulties, with the cooperation and sacrifices of the people, the chapel was completed at a cost of Rs. 1200, as recorded in Agar Parish accounts.

== Establishment of St. Patrick’s Church ==
In 1925, the new chapel was completed and solemnly dedicated to St. Patrick.

In the same year, Fr. J. D. Alvares SJ, Vicar General of the Mangaluru Diocese, blessed the chapel. The first feast Mass was celebrated by Fr. R. F. C. Mascarenhas, with the support of Christians and even Hindu benefactors.

On 10-04-1926, Bishop Valerian de Souza officially declared Siddakatte as an independent parish. On 01-05-1926, Fr. Louis J. Silva was appointed as the first parish priest. At that time, the parish had 107 families and 685 faithfuls.

Fr. Silva worked tirelessly with dedication and simplicity. He fostered unity among Christians and non-Christians alike and laid a strong spiritual foundation for the parish.

== Growth and Development ==
In 1931, Fr. Edwin Gonsalves became parish priest. He emphasized education, catechism, family visits, and social welfare. Under his leadership, a convent, school, presbytery, and other facilities were developed. A church bell and tower were installed in 1938.

Despite challenges such as epidemics, financial crises, and natural calamities, the parish continued to grow through the faith, generosity, and cooperation of the people.

Subsequent parish priests—including Fr. Apollin Mathias, Fr. Gracian L. D’Souza, and Fr. John Cornelio—further strengthened the parish spiritually, educationally, and socially. Schools expanded, catechetical instruction improved, and parish infrastructure developed steadily.

By the time Siddakatte Church completed 26 years, it had become a vibrant and well-established parish, shining as a testimony of faith, sacrifice, and perseverance.

Rev. Fr. Raphael A. Silva assumed charge as the parish priest in 1968. During his tenure, the Ursuline Franciscan Sisters established their convent in the parish in 1971. He also introduced devotion to Mater Dolorosa (Our Lady of Sorrows) by installing her statue in the church. Under his leadership, the Parish Council was formally constituted, with Mr. Lazarus Noronha serving as its first Vice-President. In 1970, the Catholic Youth Movement (CYM) was established to promote youth participation in parish activities.

Rev. Fr. Herry S. Tauro served as parish priest from 1979 to 1982. During this period, the primary school at Kukkipadi was upgraded to the status of a high school, marking a significant development in local education. Rev. Fr. Peter Serrao took charge of the parish in 1982. His tenure focused on social and educational development, particularly by facilitating access to government schemes for poor farmers and working towards improving the overall quality of life of parishioners. He also constructed a community hall for parish use. During his service, the church celebrated its 60th anniversary. Fr. Serrao played a key role in the formation of a new parish at Karimale–Vamadapadu and oversaw the construction of a new church there in 1992. His contributions are widely regarded as transformative for parish life.

Subsequently, Rev. Fr. John D’Souza (1992–1996) and Rev. Fr. Thomas D’Souza (1996–2000) served the parish, focusing on strengthening families and deepening faith formation.

Rev. Fr. Mark Walder was appointed parish priest in 2000 and provided leadership in spiritual, intellectual, and social spheres of parish life. He was succeeded by Rev. Fr. Valerian D’Souza, who served from 2007 to 2013 and was noted for his pastoral care and dedication to the community.

Rev. Fr. Antony Lasrado served as parish priest from 2013 to 2020. During his tenure, significant advances were made in the field of education, including the establishment of an English-medium school in 2014. The school building was later expanded with the support of parishioners and benefactors. A new Dwara (gateway) for the church was also constructed during this period. Rev. Fr. Daniel D’Souza assumed office as parish priest in 2020. His tenure has been marked by extensive renovation and restoration work on the historic church in preparation for the centenary celebrations marking 100 years of its establishment.

== Conclusion ==
The history of St. Patrick’s Church, Siddakatte, is a story of faith tested by suffering, hope sustained through perseverance, and community built through unity and sacrifice. As the parish celebrates its centenary, it remembers with gratitude the pioneers, priests, religious, and faithful who made Siddakatte a living house of God.

== Demographics ==
The parish has 282 families with a population of 1,504 members as of September 2014.

== Administration ==
The church administration is famous for their service in education around Siddakatte. The institutions which are started by church administration are below.

- Bal Christ Nivas
- Shanthi Rani Convent
- St. Patrick Higher Primary School
- St. Patrick English Medium School

== See also ==
- Roman Catholicism in Mangalore
- Goan Catholics
- Church Of Sacred Heart Of Jesus, Madanthyar
- Christianity in Karnataka
- Most Holy Redeemer Church, Belthangady
- Church of Most Holy Saviour, Agrar
- Mangalore
