= Eparchy of Belthangady =

Eastern Catholic eparchy in Karnataka, India

Coordinates: 12°58′52.0″N 75°17′01.2″E

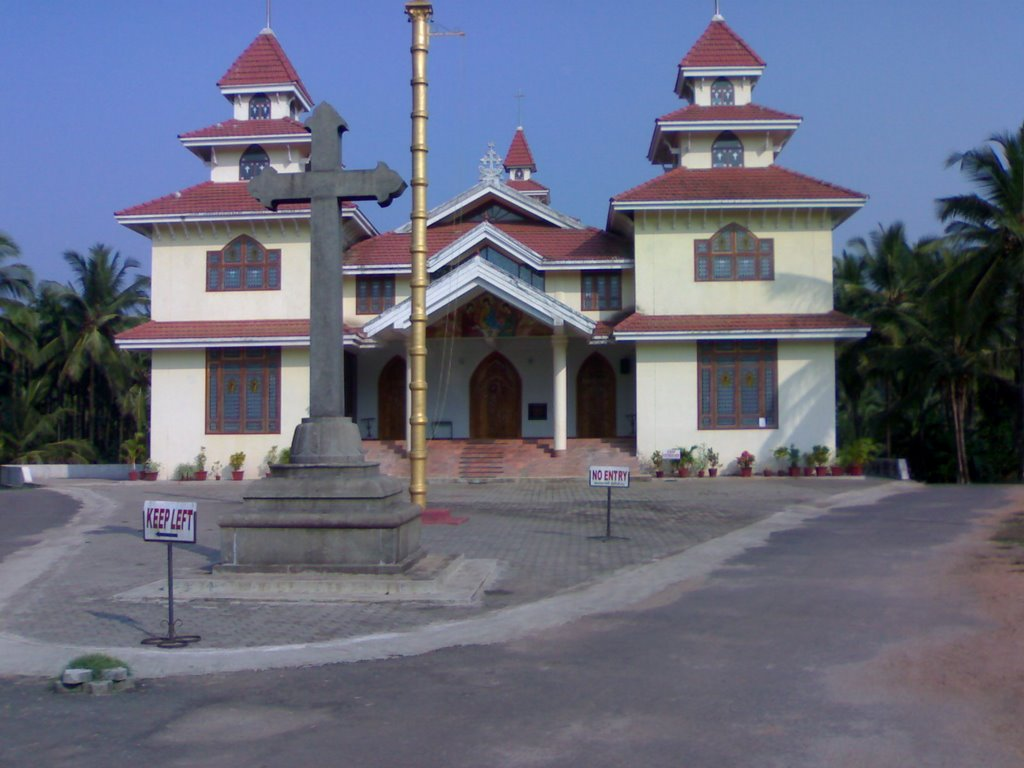
- St. Lawrence Cathedral Church, Belthangady

- Coat of arms

Location
- Country: India
- Ecclesiastical province: Archeparchy of Tellicherry
- Metropolitan: Archbishop of Tellicherry

Statistics
- Area: 12,543 km^{2} (4,843 sq mi)
- Population: Total; Catholics: (as of 2012); 3,816,295; 30,000 (0.8%)
- Parishes: 52
- Schools: 11

Information
- Denomination: Catholic Church
- Sui iuris church: Syro-Malabar Church
- Rite: East Syriac Rite
- Established: 24 April 1999
- Cathedral: Cathedral of St. Lawrence, Belthangady
- Patron saint: Mar Thoma Sliha

Current leadership
- Pope: Mar Leo XIV
- Major Archbishop: Mar Raphael Thattil
- Bishop: Mar James Patteril
- Metropolitan Archbishop: Mar Joseph Pamplany

Map
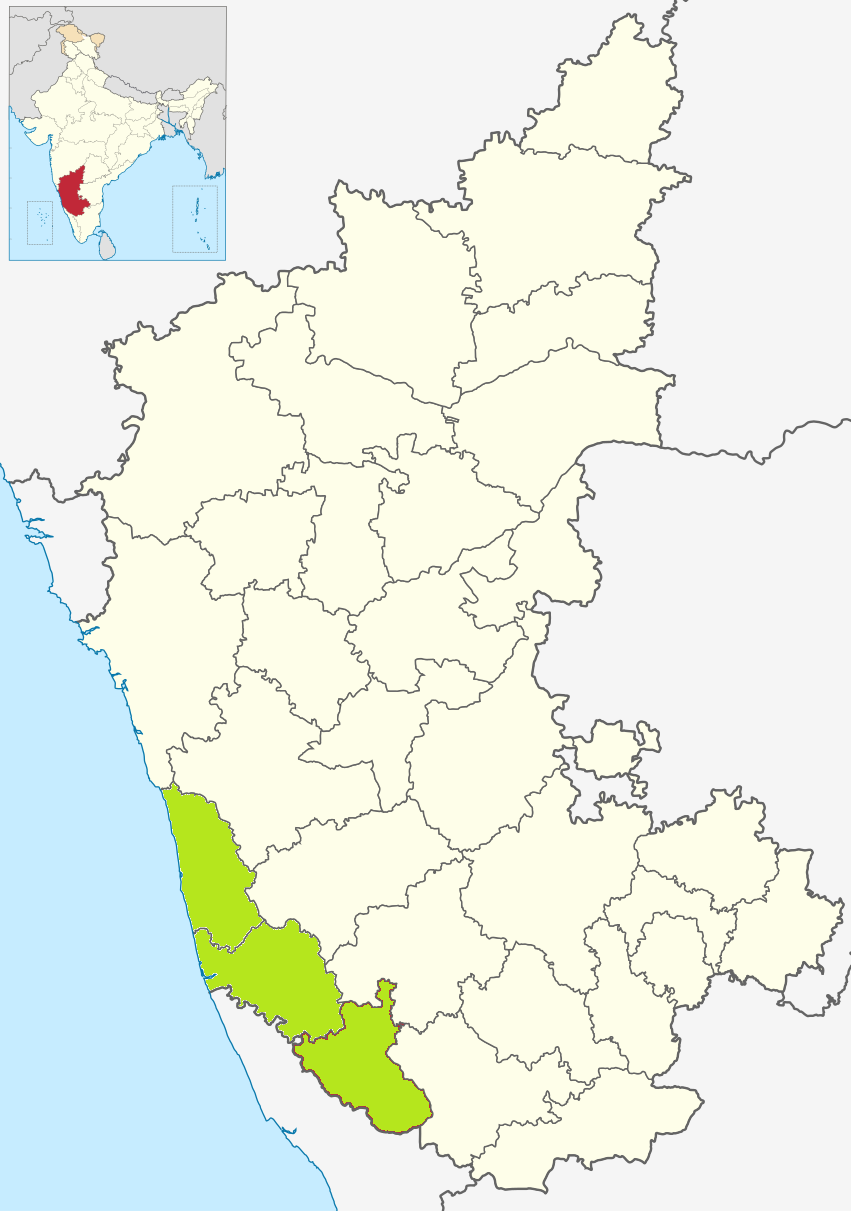

Website
- Diocese of Belthangady

The Eparchy of Belthangady is an Eastern Catholic eparchy in Belthangady, India, under the Syro-Malabar Catholic Church. It was established in 1999 by Pope John Paul II's bull "Cum Ampla"And appointed Mar Lawrence Mukkuzhi as its first bishop[1999-2025]. It is a suffragan diocese of the Syro-Malabar Catholic Archeparchy of Tellicherry. The bishop of this diocese is Mar James Patteril . This diocese had been established for the Syro-Malabar Christians of three districts in Karnataka, namely Dakshina Kannada, Kodagu and Udupi.

== Prelates ==
Bishops

Sl.no	Ordinary	Designation	Year of appointment	Last year of service
1	Lawrence Mukkuzhy	Bishop	1999	2025
2	James Patteril C.M.F	Bishop	2025	present

== See also ==
- Roman Catholic Diocese of Mangalore
- Roman Catholic Diocese of Udupi
- Deanery of Belthangady
- Syro-Malankara Catholic Eparchy of Puttur
- Most Holy Redeemer Church, Belthangady
- Monsignor Ambrose Madtha
