= Antonio Moscheni =

Italian painter (1854–1905)

Antonio Moscheni (Stezzano, 16 January 1854 – Kochi, 15 November 1905) was a Jesuit brother and painter, known best for his elaborate fresco decoration of the church of St. Aloysius College, Mangalore, India.

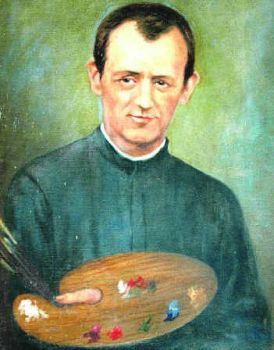
A self-portrait of Antonio Moscheni.

== Biography ==
Moscheni was born in Stezzano, Province of Bergamo, Italy. His artistic talent was discovered early, and he was sent to study painting at the Accademia Carrara in Bergamo. He then went to Rome to study the masterpieces of the Vatican. Fresco painting now became his passion, and several of his works can be found in churches of the Bergamo area. In 1889, at the age of 35, Moscheni renounced the prospect of a worldly career and joined the Society of Jesus. After the usual two years of novitiate, his superiors noted his talent, and he was sent to decorate churches in Croatia, Albania as well as in his native country. In 1898, Moscheni was assigned to India and sent to Mangalore with the specific mission of painting the Chapel of St. Aloysius College, recently founded by the Italian Jesuits.

== Saint Aloysius Chapel ==
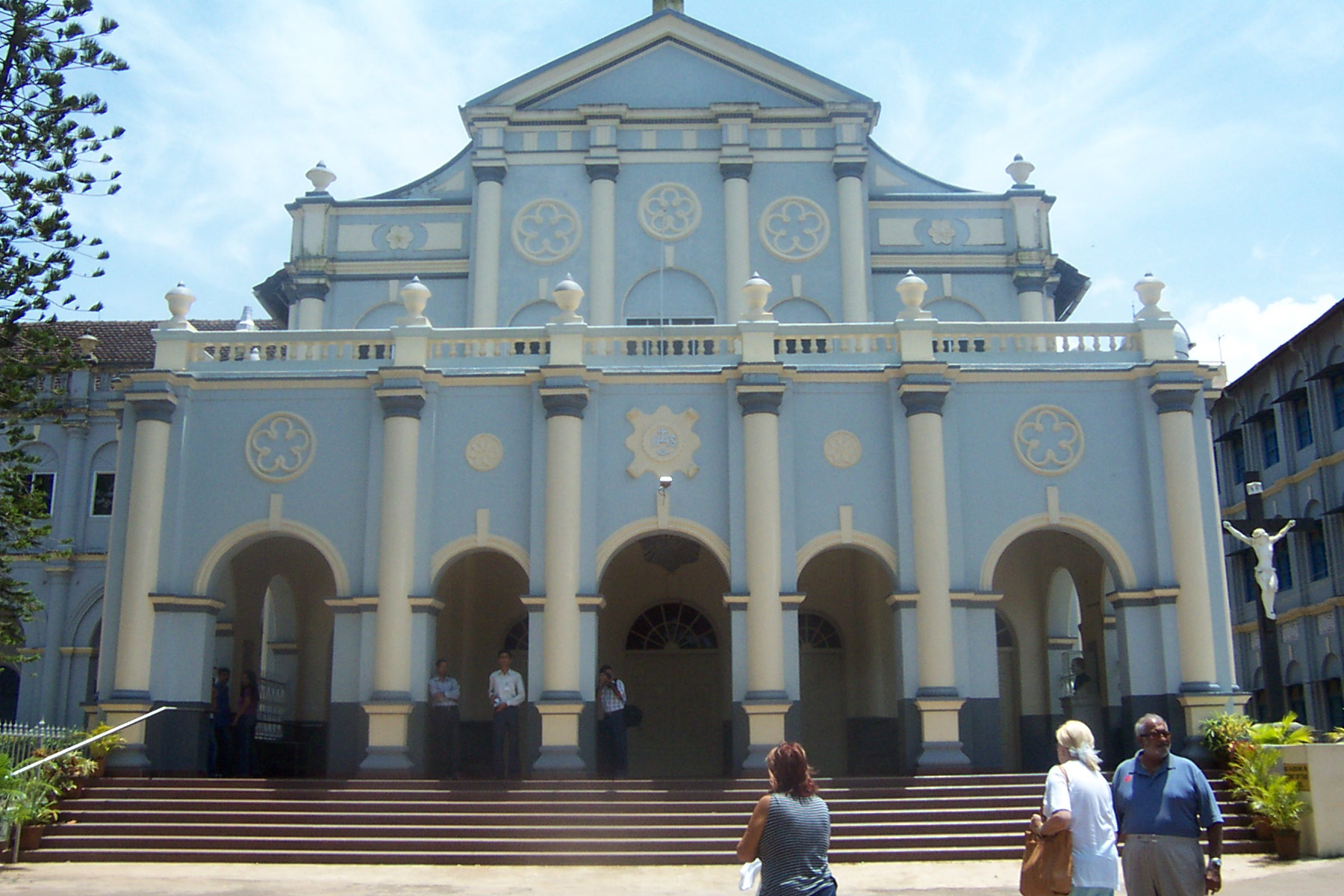
St. Aloysius Chapel in Mangalore, decorated by Moscheni in 1884

In an elaborate style recalling the baroque, Moscheni covered walls, ceilings and pillars with framed, vivid tableaux on the life of St Aloysius Gonzaga (the patron saint of the college), other Jesuit missionaries, saints and martyrs, the mysteries of the Christian faith (the Trinity, Christ and his Mother), glories of other religious orders, etc. It took him a little over two years to complete the work.

Besides the chapel, he also painted frescoes in the Jesuit refectory: scenes evocative of Ignatius of Loyola's early years and the foundation of the Society of Jesus. Less known but strikingly unusual, he depicted the Hindu goddess of Knowledge, Saraswati, on the college stage fittings. The coat of arms, painted above the stage, is embellished with a Sanskrit phrase: Satyam eva Jayate.

== Other works ==
The original intention of his religious superiors was to call Moscheni back to Europe after completing the St Aloysius College work, but his fame had spread in India, and requests came that could not be ignored. The chapel of the Kankanady hospital, the Church of Most Holy Saviour, Agrar near Bantwal (25 km from Mangalore), the Mangalore seminary, the Holy Name cathedral of Bombay were next to benefit from his talent, but nowhere is the experience as total and wholesome as it is in St Aloysius chapel of Mangalore. The bishop of Cochin called him in 1905. Moscheni had hardly completed the work in the sanctuary of the Cochin cathedral when he fell sick: a case of acute dysentery that ultimately proved fatal. He died on 15 November 1905 in Cochin, Kerala, and was buried in the Jesuit cemetery there.

== Legacy ==
The Saint Aloysius Chapel is a unique example of Italian art in India. It attracts thousands of visitors every year. The Indian postal department chose to depict one of the chapel's paintings by Antonio Moscheni in 2001 to commemorate the 120th anniversary of the College's foundation.

== Bibliography ==
- Coelho, J.: "Inspired Jesuit Painter and Artist", in Jesuit Profiles, Anand, 1991, pp. 289–297.
- Dizionario degli Artisti Italiani Viventi: pittori, scultori, e Architetti., by Angelo de Gubernatis. Tipe dei Successori Le Monnier, 1889, p. 393.
