= Syro-Malankara Catholic Eparchy of Puthur =

Eastern Catholic eparchy in Karnataka, India

Coordinates: 12°46′N 75°13′E

Diocese of Syro-Malankara Catholic Eparchy of Puttur Eparchia Puthurensis
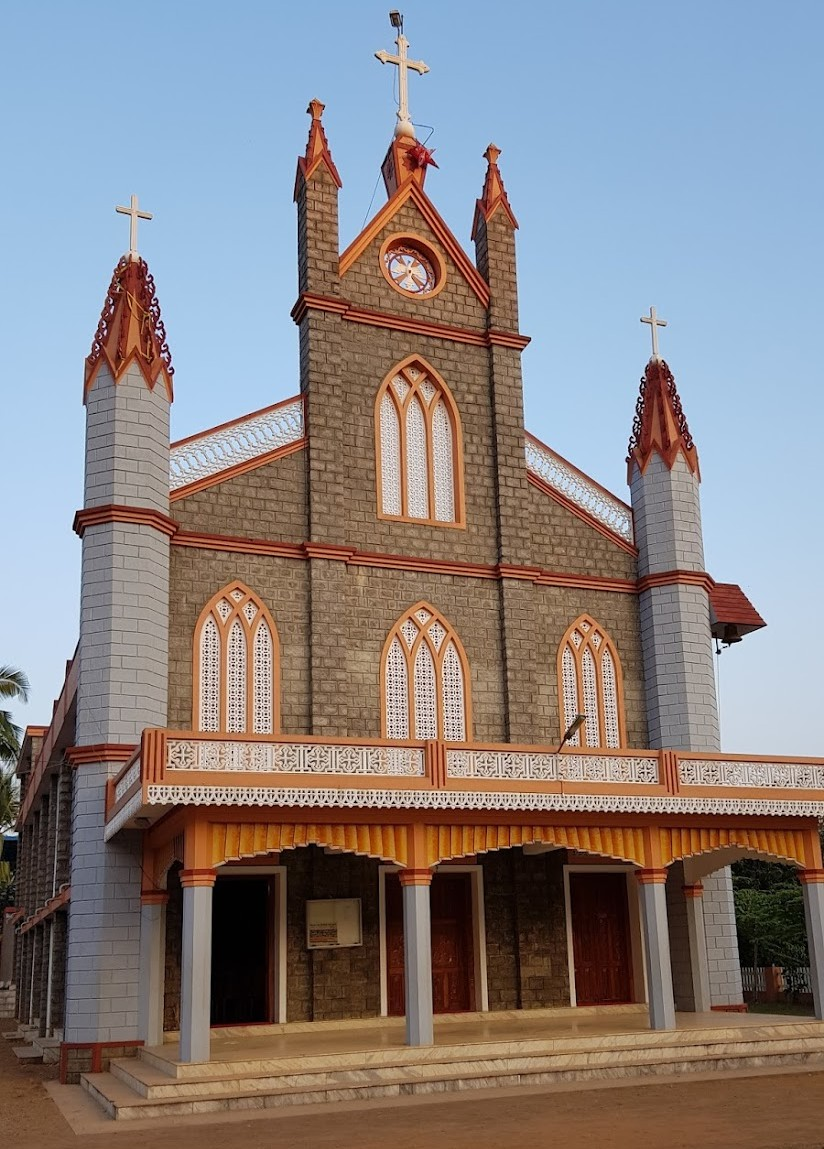
- St. Mary’s Pro-Cathedral, Noojibalthila

Location
- Country: India
- Territory: Karnataka
- Ecclesiastical province: Syro-Malankara Archdiocese of Tiruvalla

Statistics
- Area: 51,950 km^{2} (20,060 sq mi)
- Population: 2270
- Parishes: 21

Information
- Denomination: Eastern Catholic
- Rite: Syro-Malankara Rite
- Established: 25 January 2010
- Cathedral: St. Mary’s Pro-Cathedral, Noojibalthila
- Secular priests: 10

Current leadership
- Pope: Leo XIV
- Bishop: Geevarghese Mar Makarios

Map
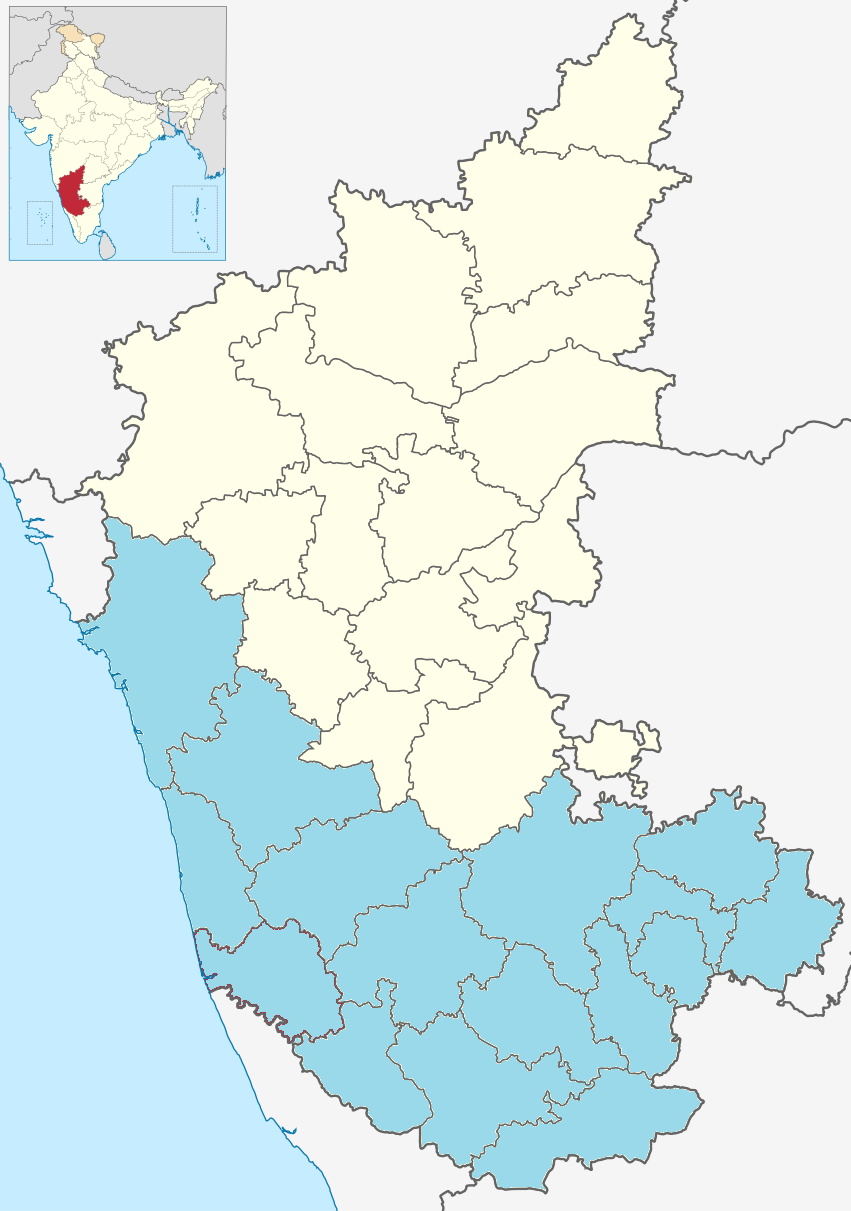

The Syro-Malankara Catholic Eparchy of Puthur (or - Puttur) (also called Puthur of the Syro-Malankars), the first Syro-Malankara Catholic diocese in India's southern Karnataka, is a suffragan in the ecclesiastical province of the Metropolitan Syro-Malankara Catholic Archeparchy of Tiruvalla, which depends on the Major Archbishop of Trivandrum, the head of the Syro-Malankara Catholic Church (Antiochian Rite Eastern Catholic particular church in Syriac and Malayalam languages), and with it on the Roman Congregation for the Oriental Churches.

Its episcopal see is the St. Mary's Pro-Cathedral at Noojibalthila, in Kerala's Puttur taluk. Its headquarters are Catholic Bishop's House, Parladka, P.O. Puttur, 574203, Karnataka.

== Statistics ==
As per 2015, it pastorally served 2,800 Catholics in 25 parishes with 25 priests (17 diocesan, 8 religious), 33 lay religious (8 brothers, 25 sisters), 6 seminarians. The diocese has 22 churches under it spread across the civil districts of Dakshina Kannada, Udupi, Kodagu, Hassan, Chikmagalur, Mandya, Mysore, Shimoga and Chamarajanagar. There are 36 educational and 4 charitable institutions.

== History ==
It was established on 25 January 2010 as Eparchy (Diocese) of Puthur / Puttur / Latin adjective Puthuren(sis), on territory split off from the (northern parts of the) territory of the Syro-Malankara Catholic Eparchy of Bathery, whose Bishop Geevarghese Divannasios Ottathengil was appointed as its first ordinary. He later resigned on 24 January 2017, due to health problems.

== Episcopal Ordinaries ==
(all native Indians and Syro-Malankar Rite)

=== Suffragan Eparchs (Bishops) of Puthur ===
- Geevarghese Divannasios Ottathengil (25 January 2010 – 24 January 2017), died 2018; previously Eparch (Bishop) of mother see Bathery of the Syro-Malankars (India) (11 November 1996 – 25 January 2010)
- George Kalayil (25 August 2017 – present)

== See also ==
- Roman Catholic Diocese of Mangalore
- Roman Catholic Diocese of Udupi
- Deanery of Belthangady
- Christianity in Karnataka
- Syro-Malabar Catholic Eparchy of Belthangady
- Most Holy Redeemer Church, Belthangady

== Sources and External links ==
- GCatholic, with Google HQ satellite pic
- forums.catholic.com
- www.hindu.com
- www.muvattupuzhadiocese.com
