= Neriya =

- village
- Location in Karnataka, India Neriya (India)
- Coordinates: 12.99°N 75.27°E
- Country: India
- State: Karnataka
- District: Dakshina Kannada
- Talukas: Beltangadi

Government
  - Body: Gram panchayat

Population (2001)
  - Total: 6,191
- Time zone: UTC+5:30 (IST)
- ISO 3166 code: IN-KA
- Vehicle registration: KA 19
- Website: karnataka.gov.in

Neriya is a village in the southern state of Karnataka, India. It is located in the Beltangadi taluk of Dakshina Kannada district in Karnataka.

== Demographics ==
As of 2001 India census, Neriya had a population of 6191 with 3127 males and 3064 females. Region.

== Environmental issues ==
The forests around Neriya village were thought to have been affected due to the Mangalore - Bangalore Pipeline (MBPL) and were in news during the late 1990s and early 2000s.

== See also ==
- Dakshina Kannada
- Districts of Karnataka
