= Siddakatte =

Siddakatte is a town in Bantwal taluk, Dakshina Kannada District of Karnataka, India. It is between Moodbidri and Bantwal. Siddakatte has a post office with the post code 574237. This post office covers the area of Kerebali, Sangabettu, Kalkuri, Karpe and Hokkadigoli and Angarakarya. Siddakatte is 40 km from Mangalore city, 11 km from Moodbidri, and 11 km from Venoor.

== Education ==
=== Schools in Siddakatte ===
- St. Patrick Higher Primary School.
- St. Patrick English Medium School.
- Gunashree Vidyalaya English Medium School.

=== Colleges in Siddakatte ===
- Govt PU college, Siddakatte.
- Govt degree College Siddakatte.
- Gunashree Pre University college

== Industry ==
=== Banks ===
- Bank of Baroda, Siddakatte.
- Dakshina Kannada Zilla Sahakari Bank, Siddakatte.
- Karnataka Vikasa Grameena bank.
- SCDCC Bank Ltd Siddakatte
- Bantwal Catholic Credit Co-Operative Society Ltd.
