= Madanthyar =

Madanthyar Madanthyaru, Modanthyer
- town
- Location in Karnataka, India Madanthyar (India)
- Coordinates: 12.950495°N 75.187093°E
- Country: India
- State: Karnataka
- District: Dakshina Kannada
- Taluka: Belthangady

Languages
  - Official: English, Tulu, Malayalam, Kannada, Konkani
- Time zone: UTC+5:30 (IST)
- PIN: 574 224
- Vehicle registration: KA-70
- Vidhana Sabha constituency: Belthangady

Madanthyar is a small town located in Belthangady taluk of the Dakshina Kannada district of Karnataka state in India. It is on the route to Mangalore from Belthangady.

== Geography ==
Madanthyar is located at 12.950495°N 75.187093°E. It has an average elevation of 685 metres (2247 feet).

== Significance ==
People from around the district visit Madanthyar to shop, particularly to buy groceries and clothing. Madanthyar is growing day by day with new infrastructure and locally owned businesses. Well known banks, such as Corporation Bank and the State Bank of India can be found in Madanthyar.

== Education ==
List of educational institutions around Madanthyar

- Sacred Heart College, Madanthyar
- Guardian Angels Higher Primary School, Madanthyar
- Govt. Junior College, Punjalakatte

== Public locations ==
- Sacred Heart community hall
- Sacred heart college indoor sports stadium

== Hospitals ==
- S.D.M.Hospital, Ujire
- L.M.Pinto Hospital, Badyar
- Govt Hospital, Belthangady
- Benaka Hospital, Ujire
- Jyothi Hospital, Laila, Belthangady
- Damodar Hospital, Belthangady
- Shri Raghavendra Nursing Home, Belthangady
- Abhaya Hospital, Guruvayanakere
- Padmambha health care, Madhanthyar

== Nearby Taluks ==
- Bantwal Taluk
- Belthangady Taluk
