= Church Higher Primary School, Belthangady =

Location
- Church Road; Belthangady, Karnataka, 574214; India; 12.991966°N 75.268943°E

Information
- Established: 1940
- Founder: Fr. John G. Pinto and Fr. Rosario Fernandes
- School district: Dakshina Kannada
- Gender: Coeducation
- Age: 3 to 18

Church Higher Primary School, Belthangady is a coeducational Kannada medium primary school and aided by state govt located in the locality of Belthangady, in the Indian state of Karnataka. It is sited next to Most Holy Redeemer Church, Belthangady. Church Higher Primary School is run by Most Holy Redeemer Church, Belthangady parish.

== History ==
It is one of the oldest school in and around Belthangady, it was started by Fr John G. Pinto in 1940 according to the records in Department of Woman and Child Development Karnataka. The school building was constructed during the tenure of Fr. Rosario Fernandes in 1949.

On August 11, 2015, the school hosted the Belthangady taluk level 19th Annual Environment Competition and Prize Distribution event partnering with Nagarik Seva Trust.

On November 7, 2014, the school hosted a free health checkup for women.

== Significance ==
The school was started as Kannada medium from class 1 to class 7. The school is managed by Most Holy Redeemer Church, Belthangady.

In 2005, the school management started Holy Redeemer Higher Primary School, an English medium school, unaided by Government of Karnataka.

In 2012, the parish started English medium Holy Redeemer High School. A conflict emerged between the parish committee and the management of St. Theresa High School, Belthangady which is run by nuns of Ursuline Franciscan Congregation.

These schools have computer facilities and experienced staff.

== Events ==
Every year on December 7 school celebrates with activities and sports.

== See also ==
- Deanery of Belthangady
- Monsignor Ambrose Madtha
