= Ujire =

- Town
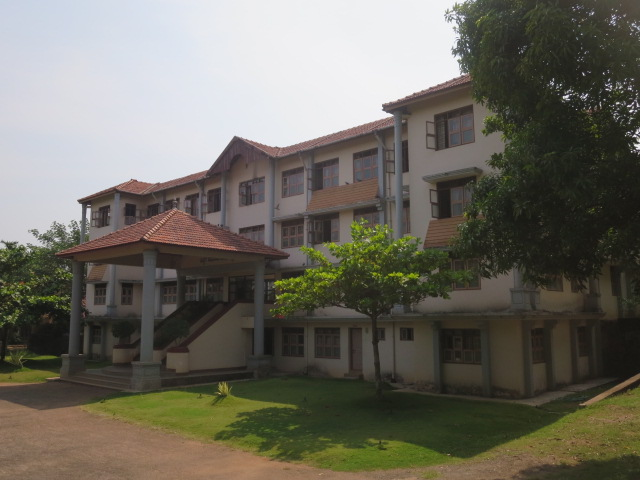
- Sidhavana Gurukula, Ujire

- Location in Karnataka, India
- Coordinates: 12.992°N 75.332°E
- Country: India
- State: Karnataka
- District: Dakshina Kannada

Area
  - Total: 26.57 km^{2} (10.26 sq mi)

Population (2011)
  - Total: 13,429
  - Density: 505.4/km^{2} (1,309/sq mi)

Languages
  - Official: Kannada,Tulu
  - Regional: Konkani, Kannada, Beary
- Time zone: UTC+5:30 (IST)
- PIN: 574 240
- Telephone code: 08256
- Vehicle registration: KA-21(Puttur RTO). KA-19(Mangaluru RTO).KA-70(Bantwal ARTO)

Ujire is a town near Dharmasthala in Karnataka, India. It is in Belthangady taluk of Dakshina Kannada district. Ujire is an important junction for travelers in this region. The road at Ujire deviates to Dharmasthala (towards Hassan, Bengaluru), Kottigehara (towards Horanadu, Chikkamagaluru) and Belthangady (towards Mangaluru).

== Education ==
The place has a number of educational institutes, most of them belonging to SDME (Shree Dharmasthala Manjunatheswara Educational) Trust.

- SDM Pre-University and Degree College
- SDM Residential PU college
- SDM College of Naturopathy and Yogic Sciences: A college in India, providing degree in Naturopathy and Yogic Science.
- SDM Institute Of Technology: Engineering college that was established in 2007.
- SDM Polytechnic Ujire: It is a diploma college.
- Prasanna College of Education
- Prasanna Polytechnic: Prasanna diploma college for engineering
- SDM Primary and Secondary School
- Anugraha English Medium School
- SDM English Medium School
- Siddavana Gurukula
- Prasanna College of Ayurveda

== Tourism ==
Ujire is known for its scenery. This is the starting point for most of the trekking places nearby. Some of them are mentioned below:

- Narasimhagada Fort (5 km) which was occupied in 1794 by Tippu Sultan. It is 1788 ft above sea level and was formerly called Narasimha Ghada. It is also known as Jamalabad or Gadaikallu.
- Bandaje Falls (15 km)
- Ermai falls (10 km)
- Charmadi Ghat, one of the most scenic ghat section of Karnataka with high supine gradient, requiring more hairpin bends.

== Transportation ==
Ujire has bus facility to various places like Dharmastala, Mangalore, Bangalore etc. There are many KSRTC and private buses to various places.

== Places of worship ==
- Sri Janardhanaswami Temple: Sri Janardhanaswami Temple is one of the main attractions of Ujire town. The temple is dedicated to Lord Janardhana (Vishnu). This is an 800-year-old temple and featured as one of the oldest of South Canara or Dakshina Kannada district.
- Surya Sadashivarudra Temple, Nada: Sadashivarudra Temple is 6 km from Ujire in Nada village. Devotees from all-over Karnataka visit here to offer clay toys as offering to the deity.
- Sri Santhana Priya Naga Kshetra:- Sri Santhana Priya Naga Kshetra Temple is one of the main attractions of Ujire town. The temple is dedicated to Lord Naga Devate (Subramanya, Kanya Rakteshwari, Naga Brahma). This is several years old temple in Dakshina Kannada district.
- St. Antony Church, Ujire
- Mohiddin Juma Masjid
- Tangai Sri Durgaparameshwari Temple
- Shri Rama Mandira
- Mahamaayi Maari gudi
- St. George Church (Syro-Malabar Diocese of Belthangady)
- Shree Vyagrachamundi Temple Odala, Ujire

== Image gallery ==
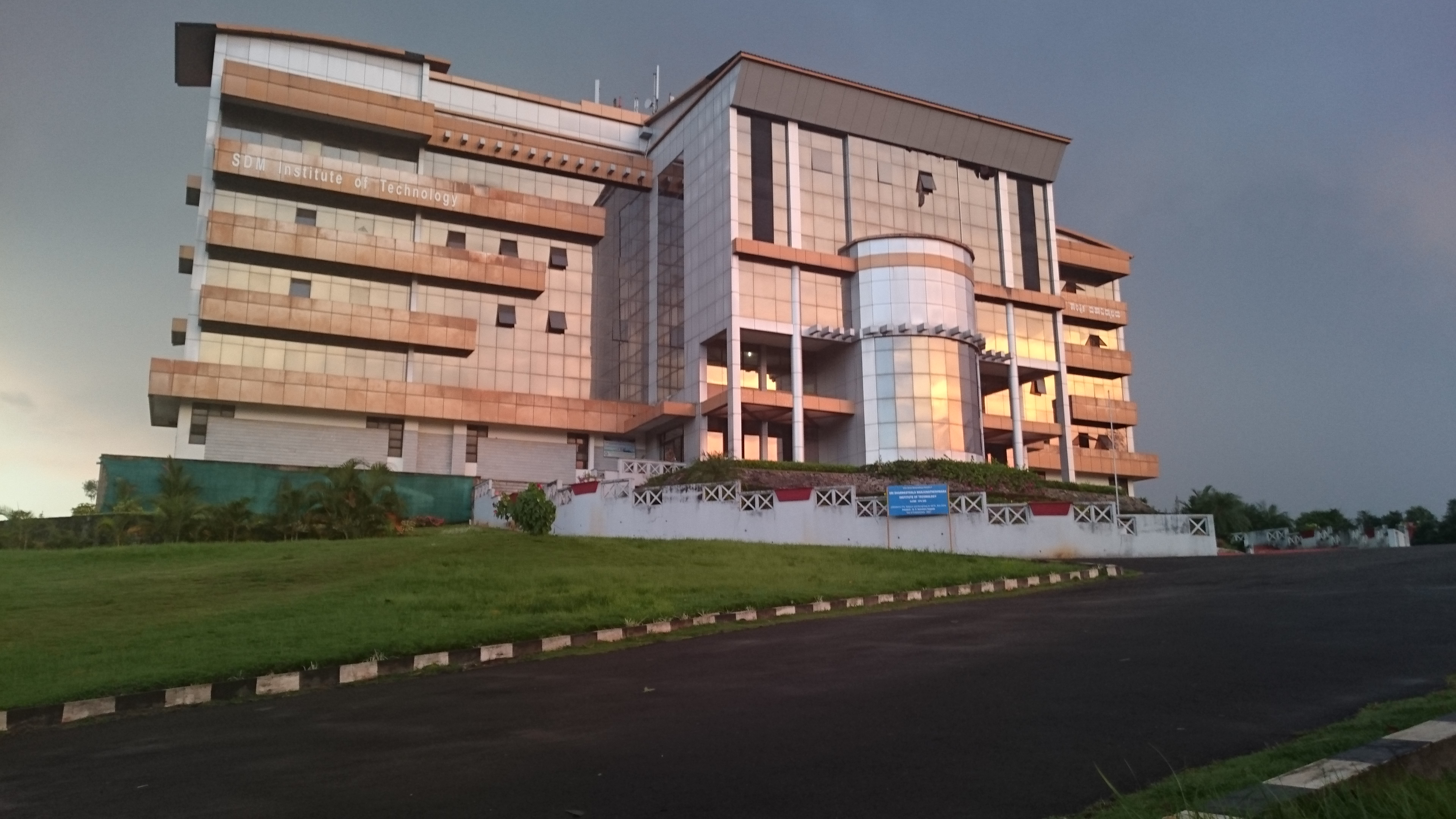
View of SDMIT from the front

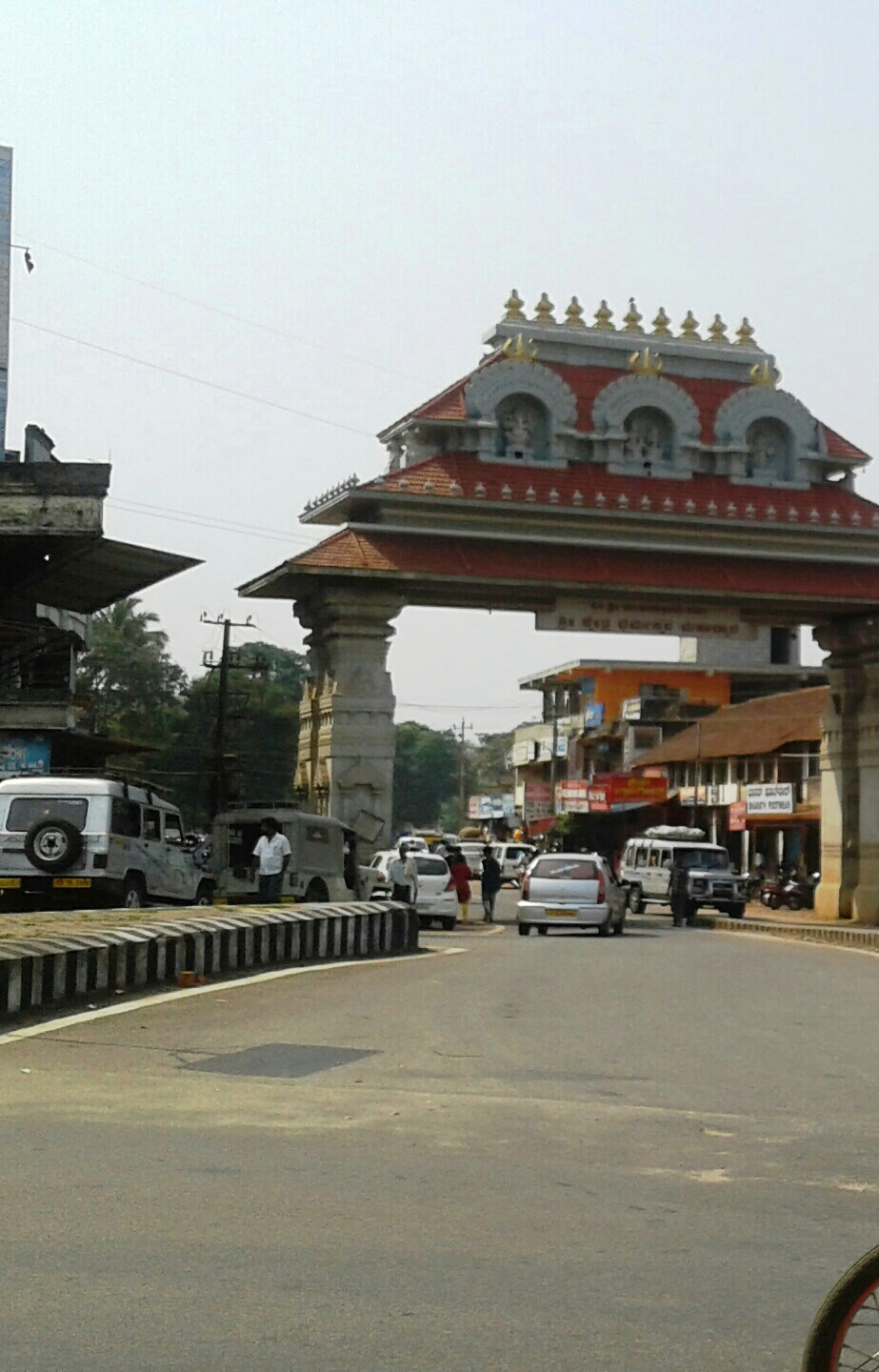
Ujire junction

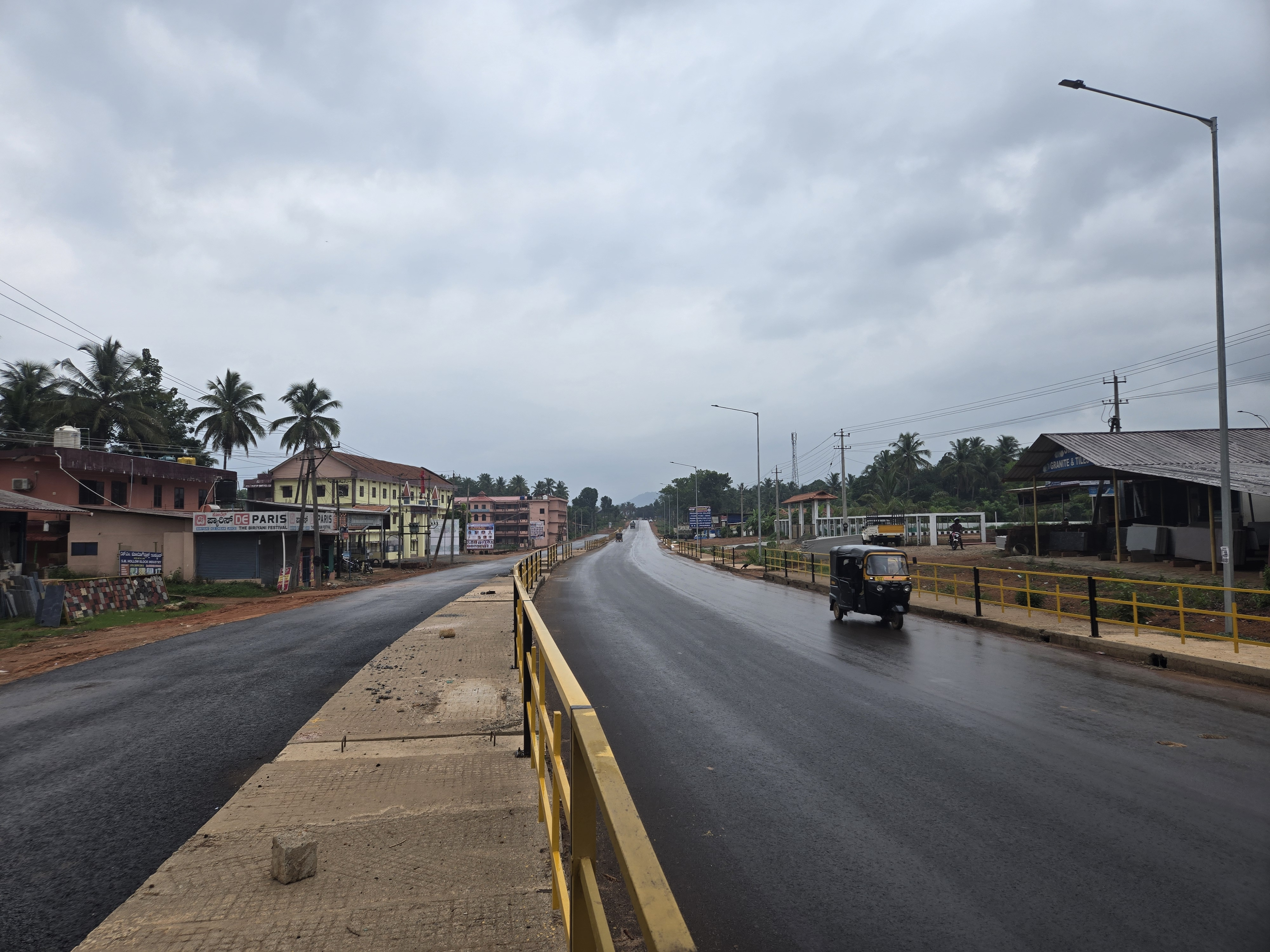
Charmadi Road, Ujire on National Highway 73 India
