= Kottigehara =

- Village
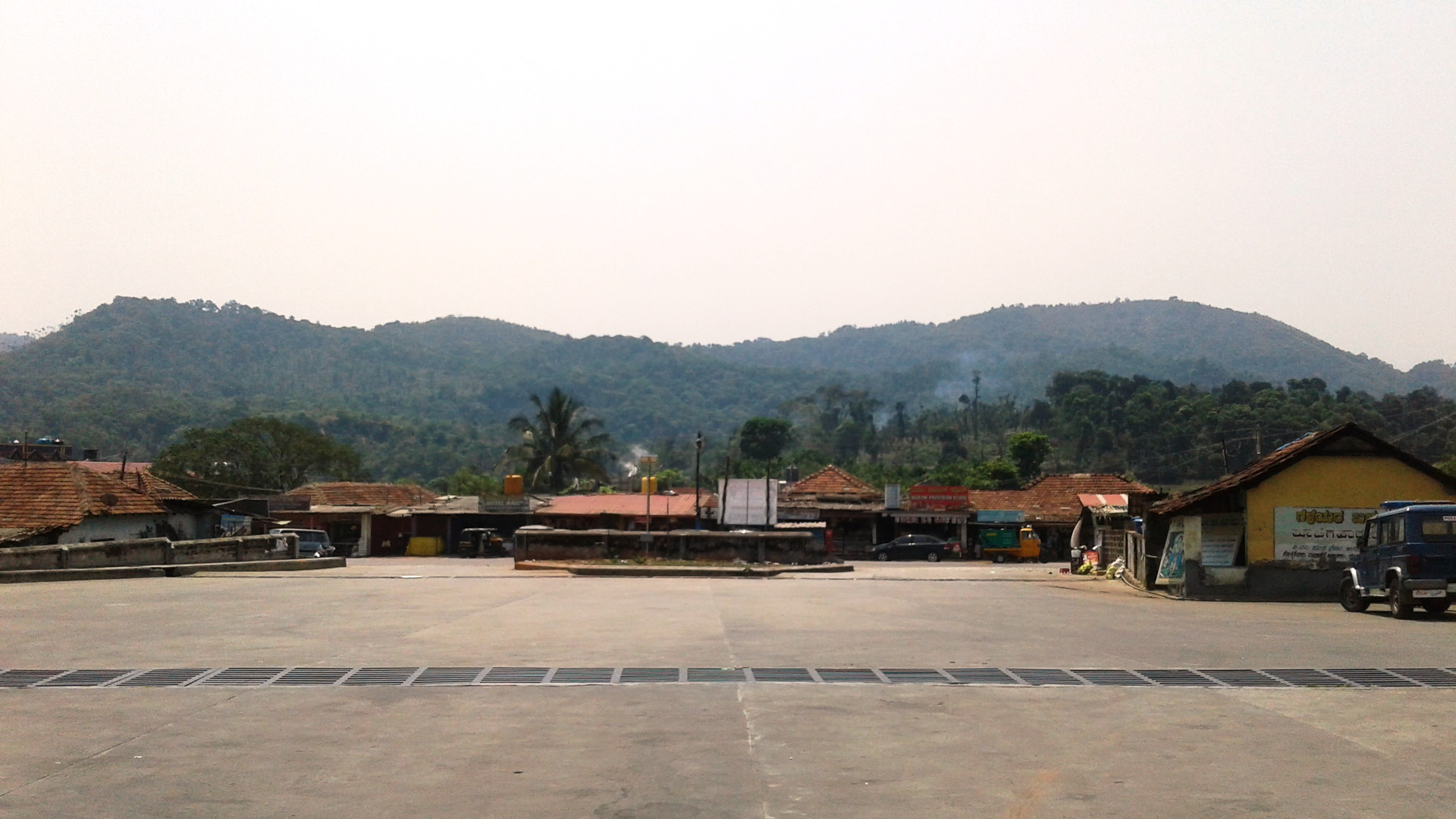
- Kottigehara Bus Station

- Location in Karnataka, India Kottigehara (India)
- Coordinates: 13.121°N 75.521°E
- Country: India
- State: Karnataka
- District: Chikkamagaluru

Government
  - Body: Gram Panchayat
- Elevation: 962 m (3,156 ft)

Languages
  - Official: Kannada
- Time zone: UTC+5:30 (IST)
- PIN: 577113
- Telephone code: 08263
- ISO 3166 code: IN-KA
- Vehicle registration: KA-18
- Website: karnataka.gov.in

Kottigehara is a village located atop the Charmadi ghat in Mudigere taluk of Chikkamagaluru district of Karnataka state, India. It is located 16 km from Mudigere town. The nearest railway stations are at Chikkamagaluru (47 km), Hassan (87 km) and Mangaluru (104 km) respectively. The nearest international airport is Mangalore International Airport. Kottigehara is located at an elevation of 962 m (3,156 ft) above Mean Sea Level.
