= Church of Sacred Heart of Jesus, Madanthyar =

Church in Dakshina Kannada, Karnataka, India

Church Of Sacred Heart Of Jesus, Madanthyar
- Location within Karnataka
- 12.9482°N 75.1914°E
- Location: Madanthyar, Belthangady, Dakshina Kannada, Karnataka
- Denomination: Roman Catholic (Latin rite)
- Website: madanthyarchurch.com

History
- Founded: 29 January 1893
- Founder: Fr Jacob Sequeira

Administration
- District: Dakshina Kannada
- Province: Roman Catholic Archdiocese of Bangalore
- Archdiocese: Roman Catholic Archdiocese of Bangalore
- Diocese: Roman Catholic Diocese of Mangalore
- Deanery: Belthangady Varado

Clergy
- Archbishop: Most Rev. Peter Machado
- Bishop: Rev. Peter Paul Saldanha
- Vicar: Fr. Basil Vas

The Sacred Heart of Jesus, Church is a historic Roman Catholic Church situated at Madanthyar near Belthangady. The church was built on 29 January 1893. This church comes under Deanery of Belthangady, Roman Catholic Diocese of Mangalore. This church is dedicated to Sacred Heart of Jesus.

== History ==
Sacred Heart of Jesus church was part of Agrar Church until 1886 and the priest from Agrar Church used to visit these villages once a year to bless the graves at the cemetery opened by local Catholics, to bless the houses and to celebrate. Later, the local Catholics obtained permission from the Archbishop of Goa to build a chapel here, to be served from Agrar Church. Fr. Emilian Alexander DSouza of Agrar Church had chosen a site for the chapel. The Concordat of 1886 came into operation and Agrar Church was transferred to the Diocese of Mangalore. So the people appealed to Bishop Nicholas Pagani SJ and he detached the area from Agrar Church and placed it under the care of Fr. Pascal Mascarenhas, the parish priest of Gaddai (Belthangady). Fr. Pascal Mascarenhas used to go occasionally to Madanthyar and offer mass in a shed in 1887. The people wanted an independent parish.

Mr Francis Dsouza Prabhu (Porso Porob) of Kolkebail endowed his vast property to the new parish. On 16 March 1889, Fr Rosario D’Souza was appointed the first parish priest.

Fr Jacob Sequeira (1890–1900) constructed the church and it was blessed by Bishop Pagani sj on 29 January 1893. He was successful in securing 50 acres of land for the parish. There were Konkani speaking and Tulu speaking Catholic families in the parish.

The seventh parish priest Fr Denis D’Souza (1925–1942) bought some land for the new church and started the construction of the church and the presbytery. The incomplete church and the presbytery were blessed by Bishop Victor Fernandes on 7 May 1940. Fr Gasper Baptist Pinto (1942–1959) completed the presbytery and flooring work of the new church. The present new presbytery is built by Fr Charles Noronha.

== Demographics ==
The parish has 673 families with a population of 3500 members. The parish consists of 23 wards.

== Significance ==
Fr. Jacob Sequeuira began Guardian Angels’ Primary School in a small shed in 1898. Fr. Denis Dsouza had upgraded the school to Higher Primary level and took over St Antony's School at Gardady in 1920. In 1927 Fr. Denis Dsouza established St Joseph's Primary School at Nainadu. The Guardian Angels’ new School building was inaugurated during the tenure of Fr Ligory D'Souza (1977–1983) on 25 January 1980. St Joseph's and St Anthony's Schools were upgraded to Higher Primary level on 4 July 1981. Permissions for Sacred Heart High School, P.U. College and Degree College were obtained by Fr Ligoury Dsouza. The buildings for both the colleges were done during the time of Fr Fred V. Pereira, who rendered service as a parish priest and correspondent of the educational institutions (1983–1992).

== Parish associations ==
The parish community are engaged in social service, helping the poor and other services which helps the needy. The list of associations in this parish is below.

- St Vincent De Paul Society
- Marian Sodality
- Women's Association
- Catholic Sabha
- Altar Boys
- Legion of Mary
- Young Catholic Students Movement
- ICYM
- Medical Relief Fund
- Maria Kripa Salesian Sisters
- Small Christian Community (Started in 2000)

== Former parish priests ==
- Fr. Rosario D’Souza 1890–1890
- Fr. Jacob Sequeira 1890–1901
- Fr. Rosario Lewis 1901–1903
- Fr. Joseph P Fernandes 1903–1906
- Fr. Aloysius E Menezes 1906–1923
- Fr. Denis J D'Souza 1923–1942
- Fr. Gasper Baptist Pinto 25-1-1942 – 10–5–1959
- Fr. William E Veigas 10-5-1959 – 10–5–1972
- Fr. Ligory D'Souza 10-5-1972 – 25–7–1983
- Fr. Fred V Pereira 3-6-1983 – 25–5–1992
- Fr. Alexander Lobo 25-5-1992 – 13–6–1994
- Fr. Charles Noronha 4-7-1994 – 1–6–2001
- Fr. Harold Mascarenhas 1-6-2001 – 14–5–2005
- Fr. Valerian Frank 14-5-2005 – 29–5–2010
- Fr. Lawrence Mascarenhas
- Fr. Basil vas is the present parish priest.

== See also ==
- Roman Catholicism in Mangalore
- Goan Catholics
- Roman Catholic Diocese of Udupi
- Roman Catholic Archdiocese of Bangalore
- Most Holy Redeemer Church, Belthangady
- Deanery of Belthangady
