= Nagarik Seva Trust =

Nagarika Seva Trust is an organisation that emerged between 1972-1973 in Dakshina Kannada district of Karnataka, India. It is essentially a social movement that has taken up various causes for the people in the region.

They have organized beedi workers, water harvesting, small farmers, seed rights, etc., for many decades now. The organisation gains its support from eminent writers of the time like Shivaram Karanth, U. R. Ananthamurthy etc.

The organisation was in the forefront of mobilising people during the Western Ghat march, also called the Appiko movement. It has also often mobilised people across various political parties for single causes. They work from a village called Guruvayankare.

In the recent years they were in the forefront of mobilising people for protecting environment around the Kudiremukh region.

With over 100,000 members, it is an influential organization in the region.
