= St. Joseph's Monastery, Bikarnakatte =

St. Joseph's Monastery
- Interactive map of St. Joseph's Monastery
- Location: Carmel Hill, Kulshekar Post, Mangalore, India
- Coordinates: 12°52′56.2″N 74°52′10.0″E
- Built: 1947; 78 years ago
- Governing body: Roman Catholic Church

St. Joseph's Monastery in Mangalore is a house of monastic observance, founded by Belgian Carmelites in 1947 in the area of Carmel Hill, though the Carmelite order had been serving the region since the late 17th Century. On the grounds is the Infant Jesus church, a Roman Catholic Shrine dedicated to infant Jesus, built in a symbolic style, with the basement surrounded by five columns representing the palm of the hand of God. The feast is celebrated every year on 15 January.
