= Charmadi Ghat =

- Ghat
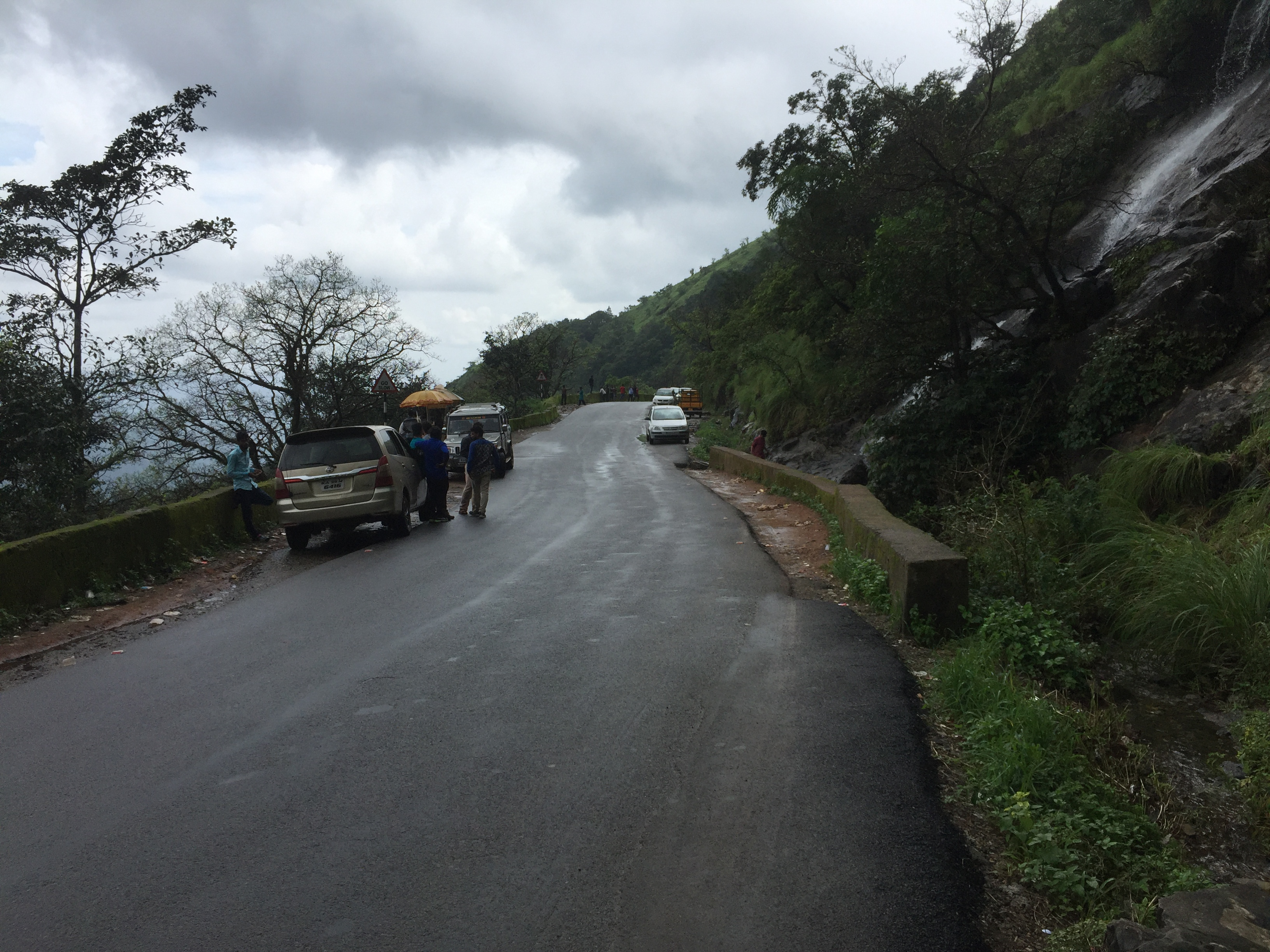
- Charmadi Ghat Road

- Charmadi Charmadi Ghat (India)
- Coordinates: 13.05708°N 75.42791°E
- Country: India
- State: Karnataka
- District: Dakshina Kannada, Chikmagalur
- Elevation: 150 m (490 ft)

Languages
  - Official: Kannada
- Time zone: UTC+5:30 (IST)

Charmadi Ghat (Charmady) is a ghatti beginning from Belthangady taluk of Dakshina Kannada and ending in Mudigere taluk of Chikmagalur. It is one of the points in Western Ghats through which motorable road passes connecting Dakshina Kannada with Chikmagalur district. The section of ghat is known by the name of Charmadi Ghat. It lies on National Highway 173 which connects Mangalore to Kadur. The nearest places are Charmadi village, Ujire, Belthangady, Puttur, Kottigehara, Balur and Kalasa and Banakal.

Charmadi Ghat starts from Charmadi village (153 metres (502 ft) above the MSL) (11 km from Ujire) and ends near Kottigehara (970 metres (3,180 ft) above MSL)(16 km from Mudigere). Charmadi Ghat connects the north eastern part of Dakshina Kannada to Chikmagalur district and the prominent highway is connecting Ujire (9 km from Dharmasthala) to Kottigehara (about 50 km from Chikmagalur). Ballarayanadurga is a fort atop a hill located about 10 km from Sunkasale, on the Kottigehara - Kalasa route.

Ballarayanadurga fort can be accessed from 2 sides - the shorter route from Sunkasale, located on the way from Horanadu or the longer route from Bandaje. In the Charmadi ghat, there is a waterfall named Bandaje Arbi (arbi in Tulu means 'waterfall') which falls from a height of 200 feet. Gadaikallu peak has an elevation of 1700 feet.

== National Highway 73 ==
The National Highway 73 (previously national highway 234) climbs the Western ghats from Charmadi. This ghat section has 12 Hairpin curves and receives very heavy rainfall of over 7000 mm during the monsoon. Some of the prominent peaks in this region include Jenukallu Gudda, Baalekallu Gudda and Kodekallu Gudda. In Kannada and Tulu, kode means 'umbrella', kallu means 'rock' and gudda means 'hill'. The roads in this ghat section are very narrow. Baalekallu Gudda is located at the 11th hairpin curve. On a clear day, the Mangalore coastline is visible from the top of Charmadi ghat. This ghat section is very deep compared to the other Ghat sections of Karnataka. Compared to other places in Dakshina Kannada, the winter is quite chilly in Charmadi because of the elevation.

== Image gallery ==
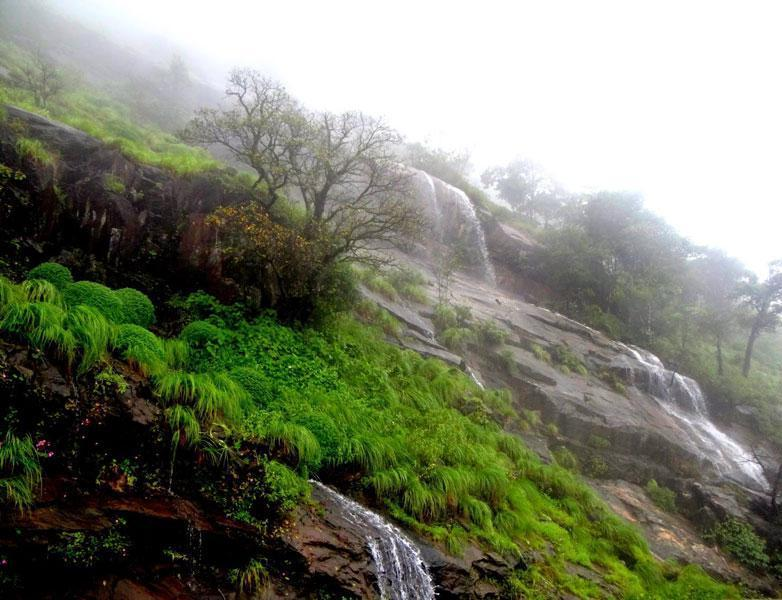
Waterfall in Kodekallu Gudda of the Charmadi ghat

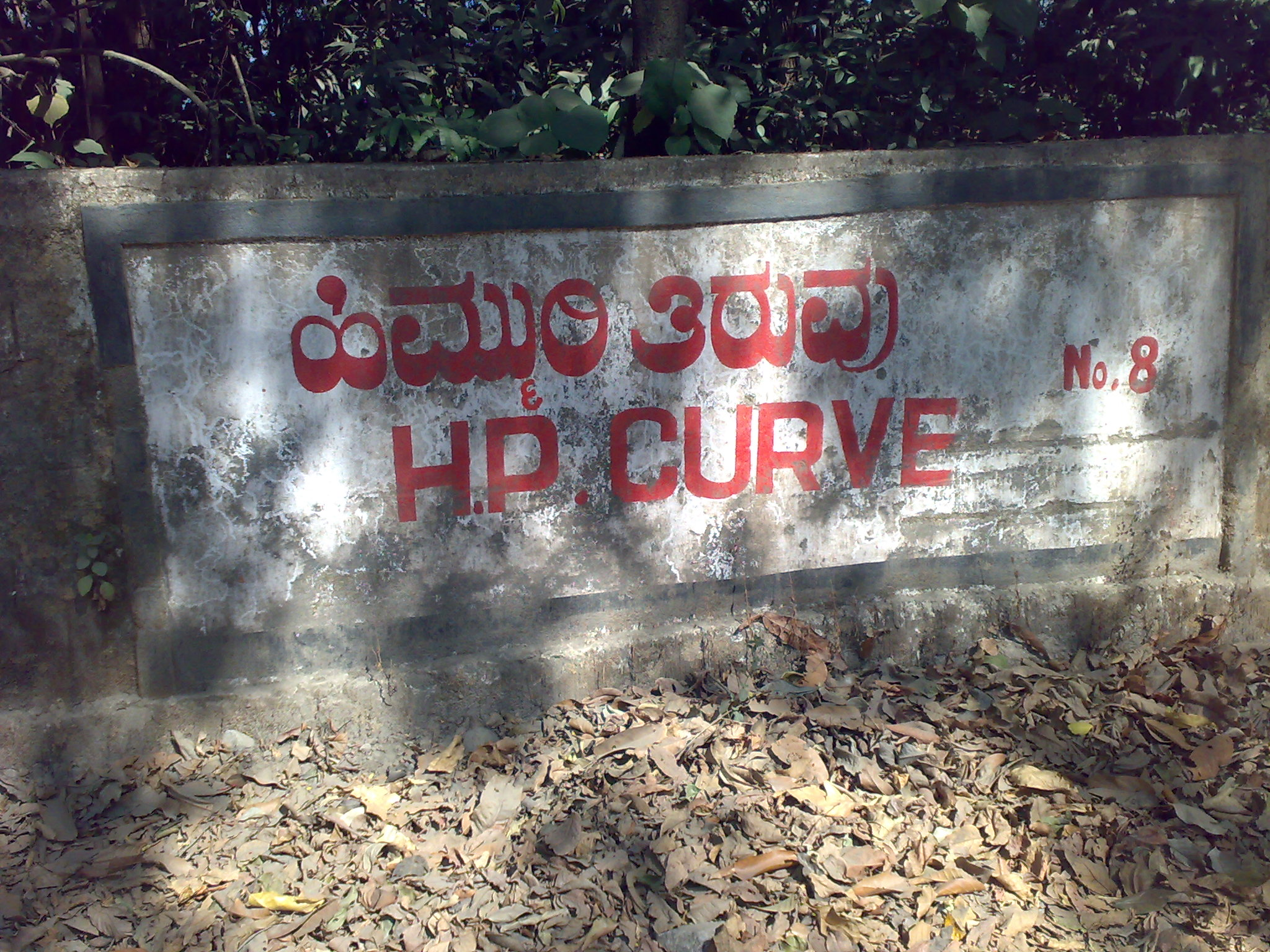
Sign by Charmadi ghat

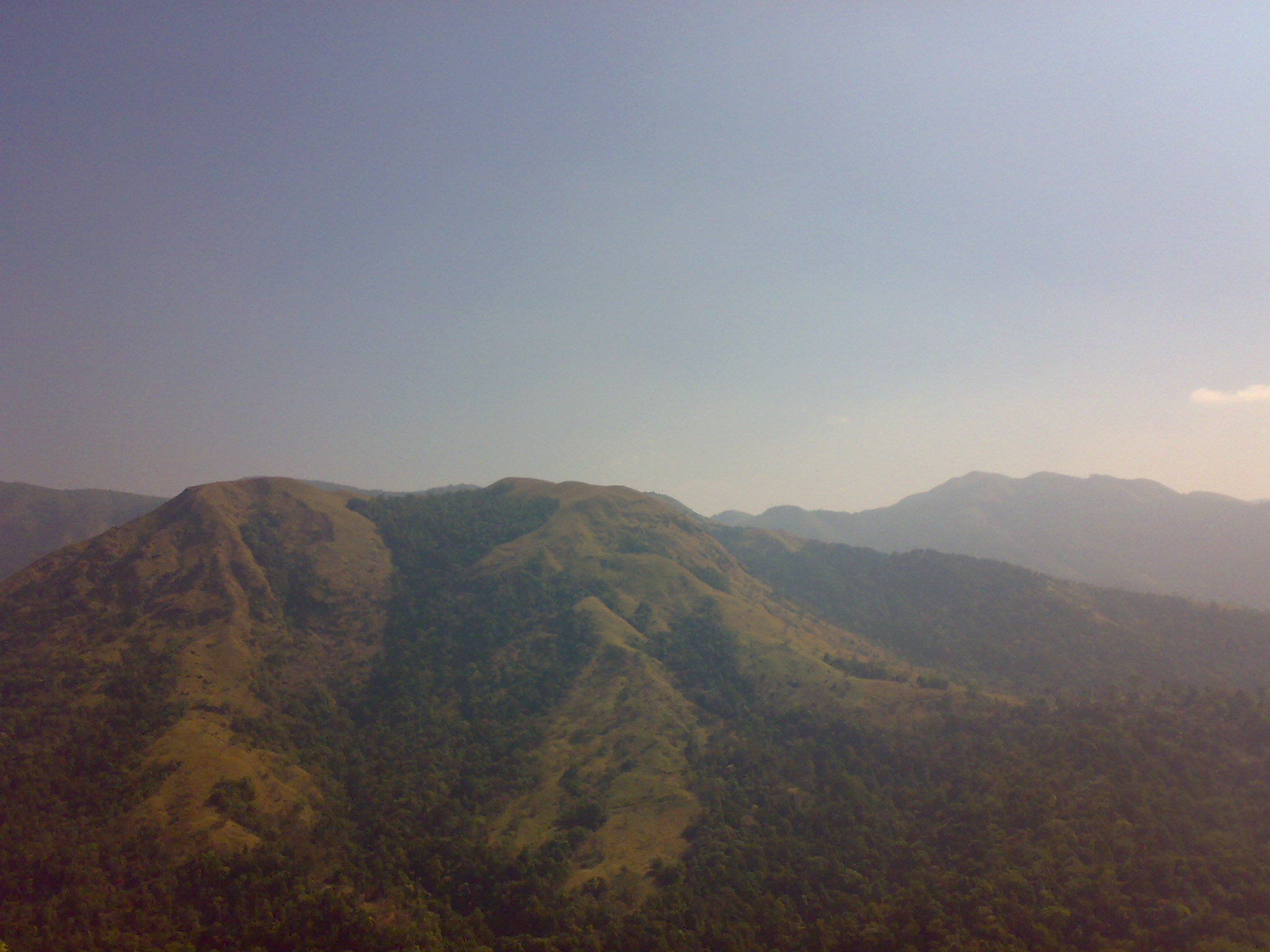
Charmadi Ghat

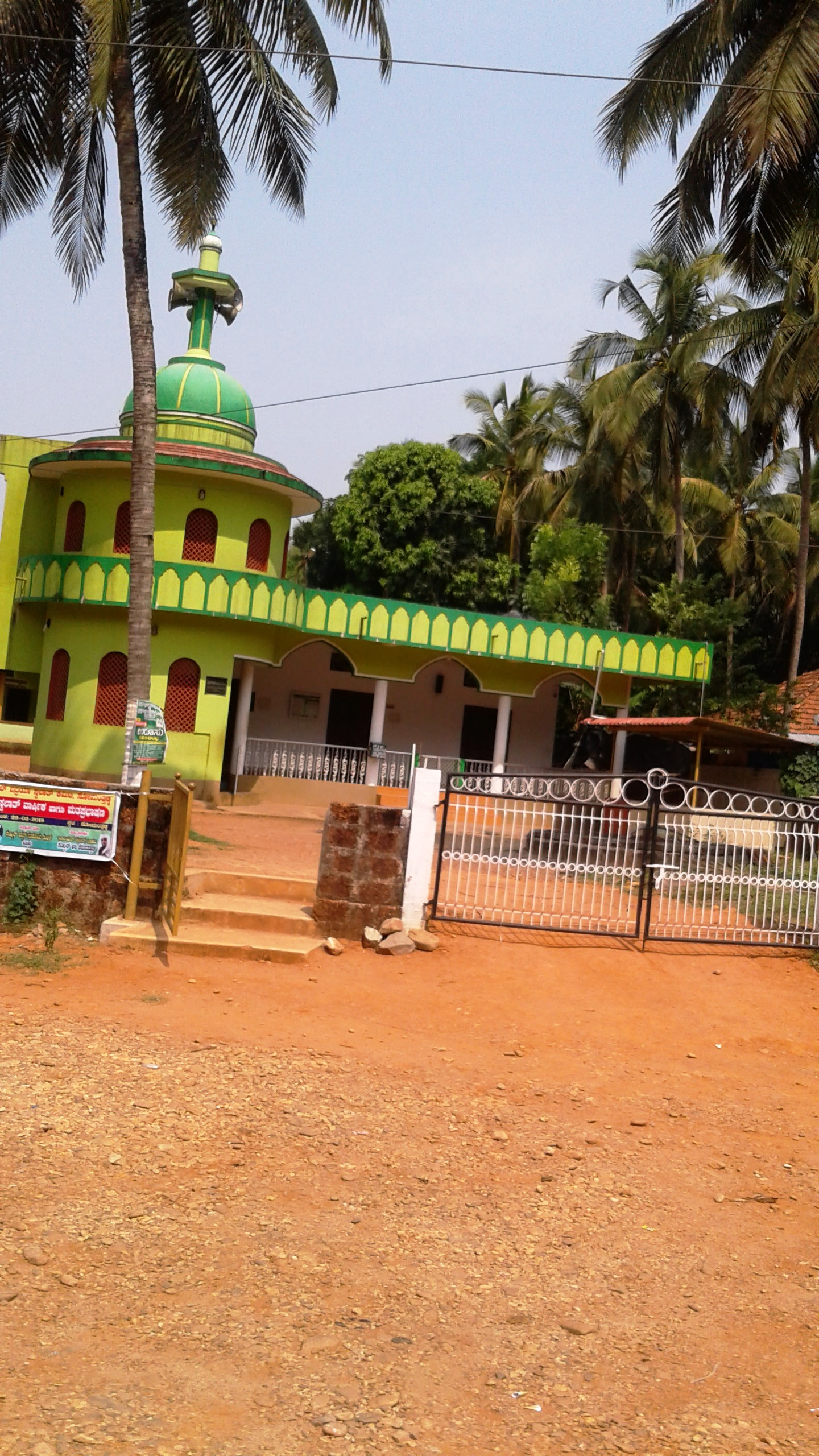

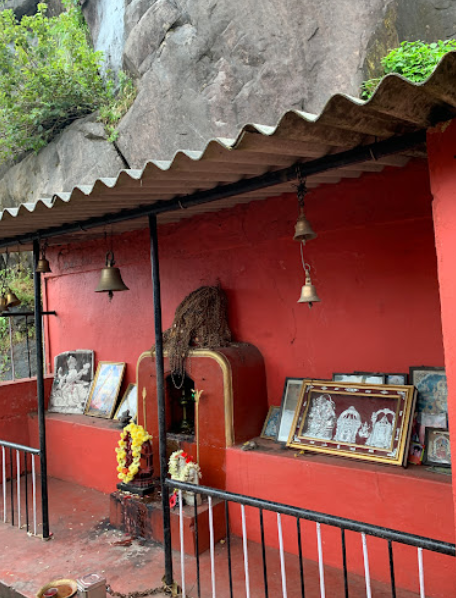
Annappa Temple at Charmadi Ghat
