= Ambrose Madtha =

20th and 21st-century Indian Catholic archbishop

His Excellency Ambrose Madtha
- Apostolic Nuncio
- Church: Roman Catholic
- Installed: 8 May 2008
- Term ended: 8 Dec 2012
- Predecessor: Mario Roberto Cassari
- Successor: Joseph Spiteri
- Other post: Titular Archbishop of Naissus

Orders
- Ordination: 28 March 1982 by Jean-Louis Tauran

Personal details
- Born: 2 November 1955 Belthangady, Karnataka, India
- Died: 8 December 2012 Biankouma, Ivory Coast
- Denomination: Roman Catholic
- Parents: Joseph Madtha and Mary Madtha
- Education: Nagpur University; Lucknow University; Pontifical Urban University
- Coat of arms

Ambrose Madtha (2 November 1955 – 8 December 2012) was a Roman Catholic archbishop and the Nuncio to Ivory Coast. He was the sixth Indian to become an Apostolic Nuncio.

== Early life ==
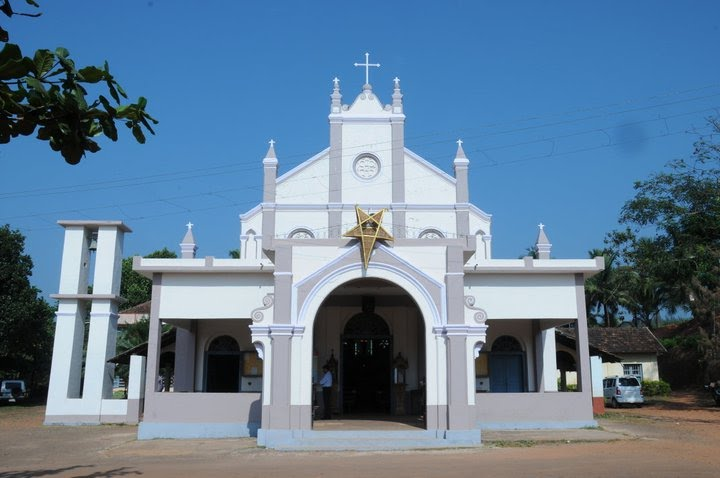
Old church structure where Madtha used to go for masses.

Ambrose Madtha was born in Belthangady, on 2 November 1955 to Joseph Madtha and Mary Madtha. Joseph Madtha (circa 1917 - 28 January 2007), son of David Madtha and Angeline Madtha was a humble and religious man. He lived a decent life with his wife Mary Madtha near the Most Holy Redeemer Church, Belthangady. He did his schooling at Church Higher Primary School, Belthangady which was near his home.

== Career ==
Madtha was ordained as a priest on 28 March 1982. He earned a Master of Arts in economics from Nagpur University, a Bachelor of Education degree from Lucknow University, and a doctorate in canon law from the Pontifical Urban University.

He entered diplomatic service in June 1990 and served apostolic nunciatures in Ghana, El Salvador, Georgia, Albania and Republic of China (Taiwan). Madtha was ordained archbishop on 27 July 2008, two months after his appointment. Around 4,000 people attended the ceremony at St Joseph's Cathedral, Lucknow, capital of Uttar Pradesh state, 500 kilometers southeast of New Delhi. They included a 12-member delegation from Taiwan, where Madtha was previously posted as Chargé d'affaires at the Taipei-based Apostolic Nunciature in China.

On 8 May 2008 Madtha was named Apostolic Nuncio to the Côte d'Ivoire. On 27 July 2008 he was ordained bishop by Cardinal Jean-Louis Tauran, president of the Pontifical Council for Interreligious Dialogue with Archbishop Albert D'Souza of Agra and Bishop Gerald J. Mathias of Lucknow as co-ordainers. More than 15 bishops from India and abroad joined the ceremony along with 300 priests and 600 nuns. On this occasion Madtha thanked people in Hindi, English, French and Chinese. Madtha also speaks Albanian, German, Italian, Kannada, Konkani, Russian and Spanish.

Madtha tried to play a behind-the-scenes mediating role during Côte d'Ivoire’s 2010-11 political crisis when the previous ruler, Laurent Gbagbo, refused to step down even though Alassane Ouattara was declared winner of presidential elections. The Catholic church was put in a delicate position since some of the country’s bishops favoured Laurent Gbagbo, who comes from the country’s majority Christian south. Alassane Ouattara is from the largely Muslim north. Côte d'Ivoire and the Vatican agreed on "the role that the Catholic Church can offer for the good of the country, by encouraging and promoting human rights, dialogue and national reconciliation", the Vatican said in a statement at the time.

Madtha was committed to finding a peaceful solution to the post-election crisis that out-going President Laurent Gbagbo opposed, to the current head of state, Alassane Ouattara. During the attack of the forces of Alassane Ouattara, backed by French troops, the Presidential Residence where Laurent Gbagbo was barricaded, Madtha remained in the Nunciature, located at 200–330 meters from the palace, where Fides had contacted him. Côte d'Ivoire had not yet recovered from the political confrontation between the two factions. One of the areas most affected by latent insecurity for the presence of armed groups was precisely the west where Madtha died. He was to celebrate a Mass in Duékoué, a town on the border with Liberia, where during the crisis of 2010-2011 more than 3,000 civilians were massacred. In July 2012 several people were killed in the assault of a refugee camp in Nahibly, at the entrance of Duékoué. The Ivorian press mentioned that Madtha made a personal commitment on several occasions to come to the aid of refugees welcomed in a Catholic parish and other structures in the area.

== Death and funeral ==
Madtha died on 8 December 2012 in a car accident in the west of the Ivory Coast. The car carrying Madtha was involved in an accident on the Man - Biankouma road. He was returning to Man, where he spent the night, from the village of Odienné, where he presided over a Mass. The driver was also killed in the accident while the secretary and a religious woman were slightly wounded. His body arrived on 9 December in Abidjan.

Madtha's family and the parish priest of Belthangady parish, where Madtha belonged, sent an official request to the Apostolic Nunciature to India about their interest to perform the final rites at Most Holy Redeemer Church, Belthangady, which was granted. The body was brought to Mangalore by a special flight from Ivory Coast on 15 December 2012. A requiem Mass was offered at Rosario Cathedral that evening. On 15 December, Madtha's remains were buried next to the altar with nearly 3,500 people in attendance. The funeral Mass was led by the Apostolic Nuncio to India, Salvatore Pennacchio with bishop of Mangalore Aloysius Paul D'Souza as the concelebrant. Auxiliary bishop of Delhi Franco Mulakkal read a message from Pope Benedict XVI. Ivory Coast minister of social affairs Anne Desiree Oulopo, president of Episcopal Conference Alexis Touabli Youlo and Archbishop of Abidjan Dr. Jean-Pierre Kutwa attended, as did several bishops. Oscar Fernandes and his wife Blossom, MLA Vasanth Bangera and others paid their respects as well.
