= Roman Catholic Diocese of Mangalore =

Latin Catholic diocese in India

Coordinates: 12.8562°N 74.8363°E

Diocese of Mangalore Dioecesis Mangalorensis ಮಂಗಳೂರು ಧರ್ಮಕ್ಷೇತ್ರ
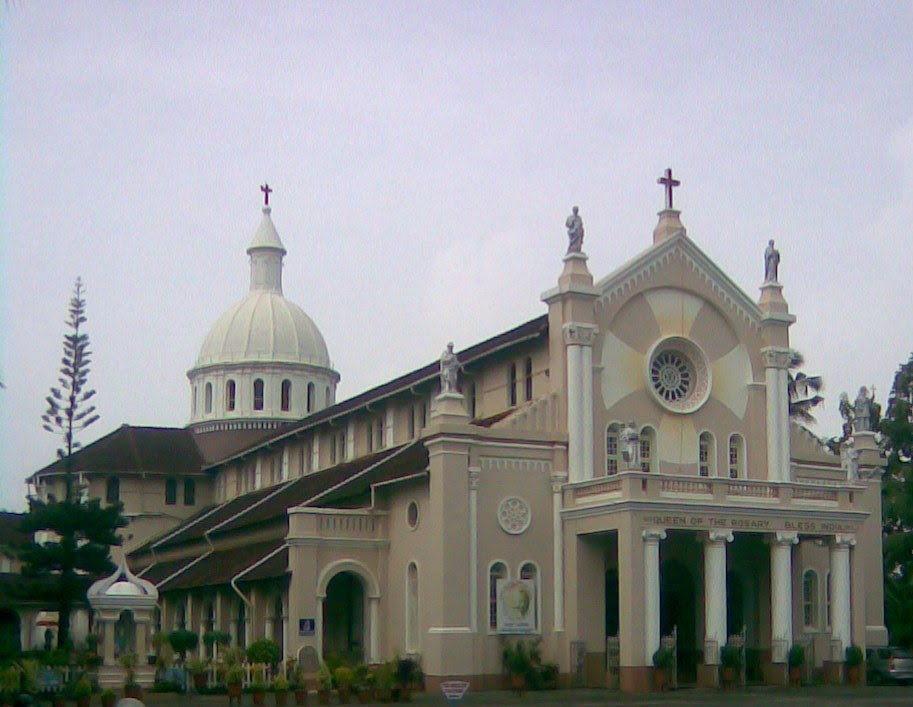
- Cathedral of Our Lady of the Rosary

Location
- Country: India
- Territory: Karnataka
- Ecclesiastical province: Bangalore

Statistics
- Area: 5,924 km^{2} (2,287 sq mi)
- Population: Total; Catholics: (as of 2012); 2,978,560; 267,343 (9%)
- Parishes: 124

Information
- Denomination: Catholic Church
- Sui iuris church: Latin Church
- Rite: Roman Rite
- Established: 1 September 1886
- Cathedral: Our Lady of Rosary of Mangalore
- Patron saint: Saint Joseph

Current leadership
- Pope: Leo XIV
- Bishop: Peter Paul Saldanha
- Metropolitan Archbishop: Peter Machado
- Vicar General: Msgr. Maxim Lawrence Noronha
- Judicial Vicar: V. Rev. Naveen Pinto
- Dean: Fr. John Baptist Crasta
- Bishops emeritus: Aloysius Paul D'Souza

Map
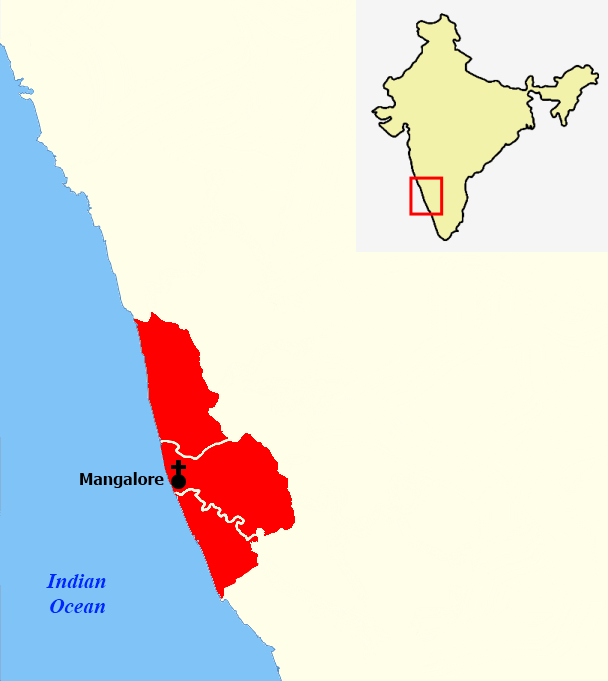
- Map highlighting districts falling under the Mangalore Diocese

Website
- dioceseofmangalore.org/

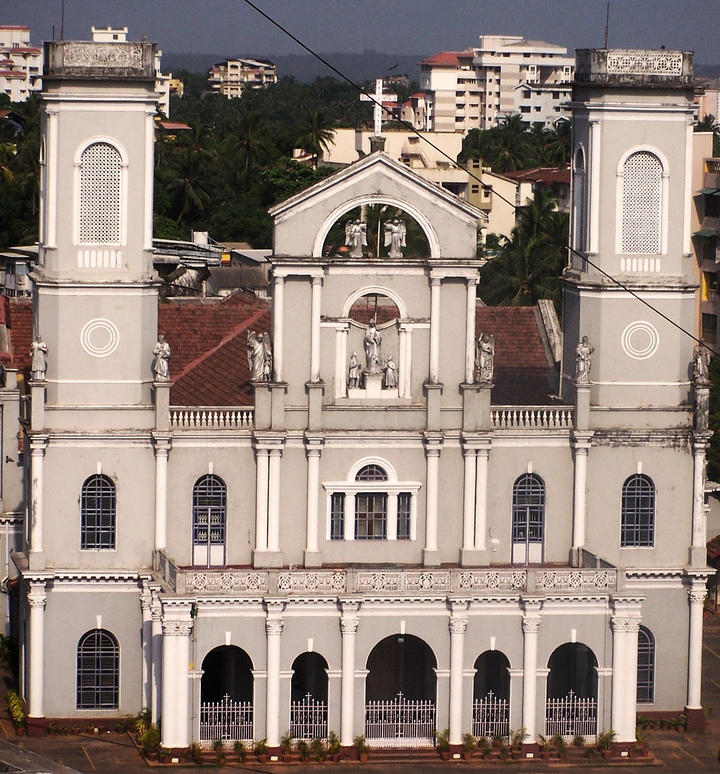
Milagres church in Hampankatta, Mangalore

The Diocese of Mangalore (Latin: Diocesis Mangalorensis) is a Latin Church ecclesiastical jurisdiction or diocese of the Catholic Church located in the city of Mangalore, India. The diocese is a suffragan in the ecclesiastical province of the metropolitan Archdiocese of Bangalore. At present, it comprises the whole civil districts of Dakshina Kannada and Udupi in Karnataka state. The area of the Diocese was collectively referred to as South Canara during the Company rule in India, in the subsequent British India after Direct rule from London commenced and in the early post-independence Bombay state, prior to the States Reorganisation Act (1956). It was established as a separate Apostolic Vicariate from the Apostolic Vicariate of Verapoly in 1853, and was promoted to a diocese on 1 September 1886.

On Monday, July 16, 2012, it lost territory when Pope Benedict XVI erected the new Diocese of Udupi (made up of the three civil townships of Udupi, Karkala and Kundapura), which will also become part of the province of Bangalore.

== Saints and causes for canonisation ==
- St. Mariam Baouardy helped found the missionary Carmel of Mangalore.
- Servant of God Raymond Francis Camillus Mascarenhas
- Amelia Cimolino

== See also ==
- Apostolic vicariate
- Church of Most Holy Saviour, Agrar
- Church Of Sacred Heart Of Jesus, Madanthyar
- Belthangady Varado
- Monsignor Ambrose Madtha
- Most Holy Redeemer Church, Belthangady
- Diocese of Belthangady
- St. John the Baptist Church, Permude
- St. Joseph's Monastery, Bikarnakatte
- St. Patrick Church, Siddakatte
- Our Lady of Remedies Church, Kirem
- Cathedral of Our Lady of Miracles
