= SDM College, Ujire =

Autonomous college in Karnataka, India

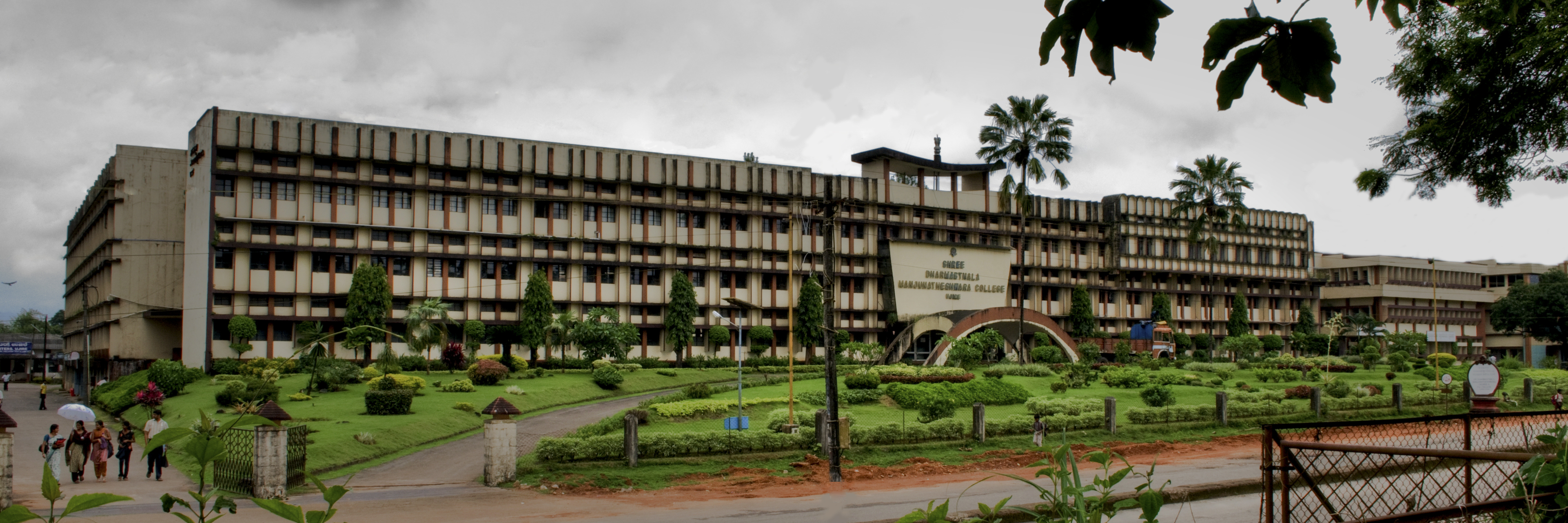
Sri Dharmastala Manjunatheshwara College Ujire

SDM College (Autonomous), Ujire is an autonomous college of Mangalore University, located in Karnataka, India. It was a brainchild of the then Dharmadhikari of Sri Kshethra Dharmasthala, Sri D Ratnavarma Heggade. Established in 1966 at a very small scale at Siddavana Gurukula was affiliated to Mysore University. It is affiliated to the Mangalore university since 1989. The college continued to grow with the introduction of Postgraduate programmes from the academic year 2001. The college attained academic autonomy from the academic year 2007. At present, the college offers 5 undergraduate and 10 postgraduate programmes, as well as PhD programmes affiliated with the universities of Hampi, Tumkur and Mangalore.

Managed by Sri Dharmasthala Manjunatheshwara Educational Society. The College is accorded with autonomous status by the UGC and is one of the five autonomous colleges under Mangalore University.

In December 2023, the college won the Mangalore University Kabaddi Championship.

== Leaders ==
As of June 2025, the college's president is Veerendra Heggade and its president is Vishwanatha P. One former principal, N G Patwardhan, died on 1 July 2024. Another former principal, B Yashovarma, died on 22 May 2022 in Singapore.
