= Peter Paul Saldanha =

Roman Catholic bishop

His Excellency Peter Paul Saldanha
- Bishop of Mangalore
- Archdiocese: Bangalore
- Diocese: Mangalore
- Appointed: 3 July 2018
- Predecessor: Aloysius Paul D'Souza
- Successor: Incumbent
- Other posts: Professor of Dogmatic Theology at the Pontifical Urbanian University, Rome

Orders
- Ordination: 6 May 1991
- Consecration: 15 Sep 2018 by Aloysius Paul D'Souza

Personal details
- Born: 27 April 1964 (age 62) Kinnigoli, Karnataka India
- Denomination: Roman Catholic
- Education: Pontifical Urban University

Bishop Peter Paul Saldanha is the current serving bishop of the Roman Catholic Diocese of Mangalore, India.

== Early life and education ==
Saldanha was born on 27 April 1964 in Our Lady of Remedies church kirem, Kinnigoli, Karnataka. He completed his philosophy and theology education from St. Joseph’s Inter diocesan Seminary, Jeppu, Mangalore. He acquired a diploma in Depth Psychology and Formation, from the Institute for Formators, Bangalore, in 1994. He also holds a doctorate in theology from the Pontifical Urbanian University.

== Priesthood ==
On 6 May 1991, Saldanha was ordained a priest for the Roman Catholic Diocese of Mangalore. After ordination he served as Assistant parish priest of St. Lawrence's Parish, Moodubelle, Assistant parish priest of Our Lady of Miracles Parish, assistant parish priest of Our Lady of Dolours Parish, Vittal, Professor and formator at St. Joseph's Inter diocesan Seminary, Jeppu, Vice Rector of St. Joseph's Inter diocesan Seminary, Jeppu, Professor at St. Joseph's Inter diocesan Seminary, Jeppu, Professor of Dogmatic Theology at the Pontifical Urban University in Rome, Assistant Spiritual Father at the Pontifical Urban College "de Propaganda Fide", Rome, Associate Professor of the Pontifical Urban University, Rome.

== Episcopate ==
Pope Francis appointed Saldanha as bishop of the Roman Catholic Diocese of Mangalore on 3 July 2018 and consecrated by Aloysius Paul D'Souza on 15 Sep 2018 at Our Lady of Rosary Cathedral, Mangalore. Prior to his appointment he serving as Adiutor Secretarii Specialis of the XIV Ordinary General Assembly of the Synod of Bishops.

== Reception ==
Bishop Peter launched the anti-drug campaign to combat drug menace in schools and colleges.
