= Belthangady =

- Town
- Location in Karnataka, India
- Coordinates: 12.9210°N 75.2778°E
- Country: India
- State: Karnataka
- District: Dakshina Kannada
- Taluka: Belthangady

Government
  - Body: Town panchayat
  - MLA: Harish Poonja (BJP)

Area
  - Town: 8.87 km^{2} (3.42 sq mi)
  - Rank: 1st in (Dakshina Kannada)
- Elevation: 108 m (354 ft)

Population (2011)
  - Town: 7,635
  - Density: 861/km^{2} (2,230/sq mi)
  - Metro: 246,494

Languages
  - Official: Kannada,Tulu
- Time zone: UTC+5:30 (IST)
- PIN: 574 214
- Telephone code: 08256
- Vehicle registration: KA 21, KA 70
- Lok Sabha constituency: Dakshina Kannada
- Vidhana Sabha constituency: Belthangady
- Website: belthangaditown.mrc.gov.in

Belthangady is a town panchayat and the headquarters of Belthangady taluk of the Dakshina Kannada (South Canara) district of Karnataka state in India.

== Demographics ==
In 2001 in the town of Belthangady, 11% of the population was under 6 years of age.

In the 2011 census, the town of Belthangady had a population of 7,635.

Beltangadi Religion Data 2011

Population, 7,746

Hindu, 73.70%

Muslim, 12.42%

Christian, 11.46%

== Education ==
List of Colleges

- SDM College, Ujire
- Govt First Grade College, Belthangady
- Vani P U college, Belthangady
- St. Theresa High School, Belthangady
- Church Higher Primary School, Belthangady
- St Mary's School Laila.

== Geography ==
Belthangady is located at 13.9833°N 75.3°E. It has an average elevation of 108 metres (354 feet).
