= 2008 attacks on Christians in southern Karnataka =

- Districts affected by the attacks. Udupi district Chikkamagaluru district Dakshina Kannada district.
- Location: Chikkamagaluru district, Dakshina Kannada district, and Udupi district in Karnataka

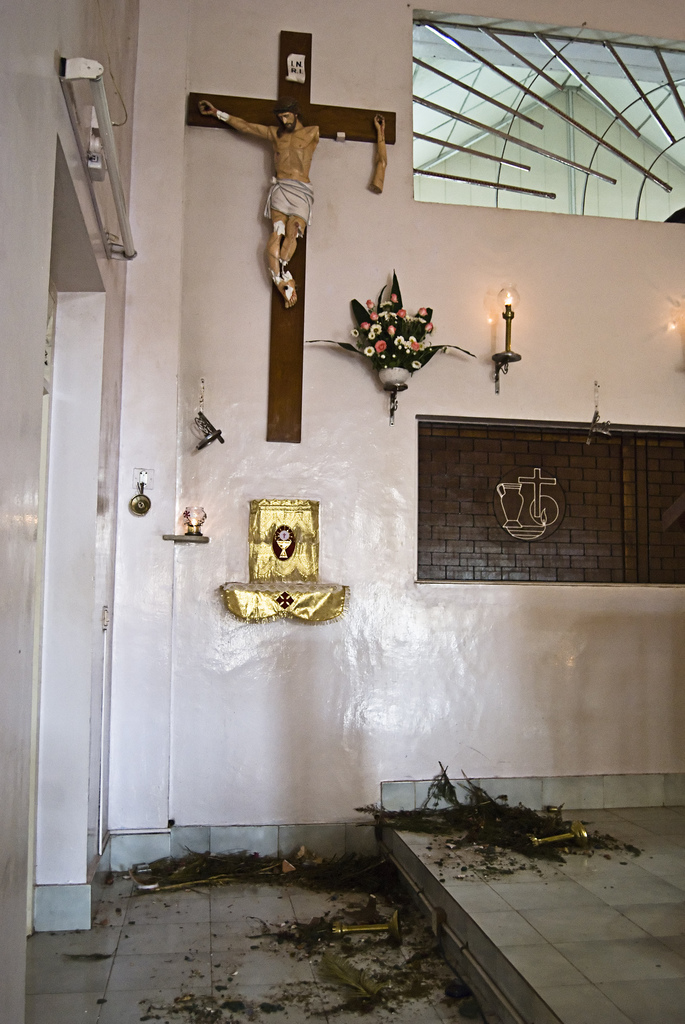
Destroyed property inside Adoration Monastery, Mangalore, after it was vandalised by Bajrang Dal militants.

The 2008 attacks on Christians in southern Karnataka were the wave of attacks directed against Christian churches and prayer halls in the Indian city of Mangalore and the surrounding area of southern Karnataka in September and October 2008 by Hindutva militant organisations such as Bajrang Dal and Sri Ram Sena. The attacks were widely perceived by Christians in southern Karnataka to be revenge from Hindutva organisations, because Mangalorean Christians had been outspoken about the 2008 anti-Christian attacks in Orissa.

On 29 August, many groups across India participated in a "prayer for peace and communal harmony" in response to ongoing anti-Christian violence in Orissa. St Aloysius College and around 2,000 Christian schools in Karnataka went on strike on 29 August, protesting against the attacks in Orissa. This was in defiance of orders of the government that 29 August was to be a regular work day. The BJP administration of Karnataka denounced local Christian institutions for disobeying the orders, and a Bajrang Dal demonstration was held outside St Aloysius College. Strikes and protests continued for the next two weeks. The main attacks began on 14 September, when a group of youths from the Bajrang Dal went inside the chapel of Adoration Monastery of the Sisters of St Clare near the Milagres Church in Hampankatta and desecrated it. Some 20 churches, temples, and halls belonging to Catholic, Protestant, Jehovah's Witness, and independent Christians were attacked. Christian buildings were damaged across Mangalore taluk, Dakshina Kannada, Udupi and Chikkamagaluru districts. A few Christian institutions were later attacked in Bangalore district and Kasaragod district.

Christians staged protests in response to the violence. One particularly large one was staged by the Catholics of Karkala deanery on 15 September. Church bells rang across the churches of Mangalore, calling parishioners to respond. The protests led to strong police suppression with lathi charges and tear gas; the police made around 150 arrests and injured 30 to 40 people. Violence broke out at the Adoration Monastery as police began caning the protestors with sticks and firing tear gas, and both sides pelted each other with stones. Between 15 September and 10 October, a new wave of anti-minority attacks began against Christian communities outside Karnataka, as well as against Muslim communities.

The state government denied fault for the attacks and defended the harsh police response. In February 2011, retired Justice MF Saldanha of the Bombay High Court published a report in which he described the attacks as "state-sponsored terrorism" and implicated the government as complicit with Hindu nationalist organisations. The report led to more than 100,000 Christians across multiple denominations protesting again in a silent march in Mangalore on 21 February, with the support of secular organisations. Following the publication of the report and subsequent protests, the Government of Karnataka announced that it would drop 338 criminal cases registered against Christians related to their participation in the protests. In December 2011, a further 23 cases against Christians were dropped.

== Background and cause ==
Mangalore has long been a major Christian centre in India. In 1526, under the viceroyship of Lopo Vaz de Sampaio, the Portuguese took possession of Mangalore and Christianity began to spread via their missionaries. Many Christians migrated to South Canara from Goa. The Mangalorean Catholics were persecuted by Tipu Sultan during his reign between 1782 and 1799 and many were forcibly converted to Sunni Islam. On 24 February 1784, Tipu rounded up 60,000 to 80,000 Mangalorean Catholics and transported them to Seringapatam. They were held there in captivity for 15 years, until the British defeated the Mysoreans at the Battle of Seringapatam on 4 May 1799, with Tipu being killed in action during the battle. Only 15,000–20,000 of those Catholics taken captive in 1784 survived. In the latter half of the 19th century, Protestant missionaries began working in Mangalore and surrounding communities, and the Vicariate of Mangalore was established in 1853. Mangalore, noted for its many churches and the strong representation of Catholics, was at one time known as the "Rome of the East". However it is also noted as a pilgrimage centre for Hindus, given its numerous Hindu temples and shrines. Between 1991 and 2011, the percentage of Christians living in India reportedly dropped from 2.7 per cent to 2.2 per cent, a declining figure which has been linked to ongoing difficulties facing Christians in a predominantly Hindu nation. In 2008, an estimated 320,300 Christians were living in the Dakshina Kannada district.

"Historically, Dakshina Kannada district has been a very long standing RSS / VHP stronghold. Right from the days of the freedom movement and thereafter when Gandhi was assassinated by a group of fanatics who maintained that his brand of politics was unacceptable to the Hindu fundamentalists, the district has always been the nerve-centre of these movements with regular morning drills on the maidans (grounds), processions, baithaks (seatings) and sammelans (meetings). These activities took a violent turn after the year 2000 when it was found very convenient to target the Muslim community on the ground that they are allegedly anti-nationals and that they are disloyal to this country. It is an offence under the IPC to indulge in any form of communal disharmony but the offensive articles kept regularly appearing in the Press headed by a leading Kannada daily owned by some industrialists from Manipal, particularly after the 1993 Bombay Bomb Blasts and violent incidents in different parts of the country. Mangalore in particular, and some of the other towns in Dakshina Kannada were prone to Hindu–Muslim violence though on a relatively small and isolated scale but this was definitely a disturbing factor. Never had it happened before that the Christian community had been attacked."

— Extract from the Saldanha Commission report into the background of religious tensions in the Dakshina Kannada district.

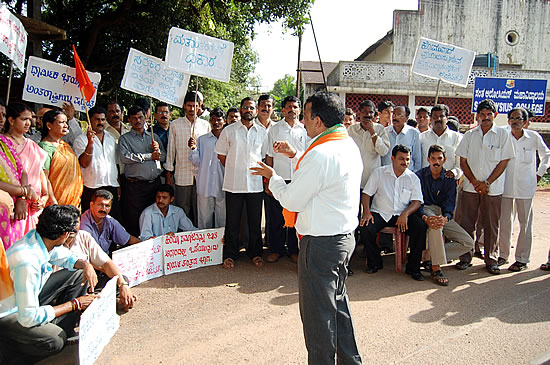
Activists belonging to the Bajrang Dal protested outside the gates of St Aloysius College on 29 August.

Several explanations of the cause of the September 2008 attacks have been postulated. Many Christians believe that the attacks were a direct response from right-wing Hindu organisations who were targeting the people of Mangalore and the surrounding area because they had been outspoken about persecution of Christians in Orissa. St. Aloysius College, a Jesuit institution in Mangalore, and some other 2000 Christian schools in Karnataka, went on strike for varying periods between 29 August and 5 September prior to the attacks, protesting against anti-Christian persecution in Orissa, contrary to the orders of the government who stated that they were to be regular work days. Primary and secondary education minister Vishweshwar Hegde Kageri, responding to the shutting down of the Christian educational institutions in Karnataka, had directed the public education department to issue show-cause notices to schools that had objected to the violence against Christians in Orissa. A Christian institution in Shimoga had reportedly received a notice from the education ministry of Karnataka during the strike saying, "The VHP and Bajrang Dal have conducted a protest against the closure of schools and criticised your action. They have submitted letters requesting action against you for this. In this context, you are asked to show cause as to why action should not be initiated against you for using religion as an excuse to announce a holiday and as to why permission to run your institution should not be withdrawn." State Home Minister V. S. Acharya explained the reason for the notices, "All Christian institutions are grant-in-aid institutions of the government and they should have had the courtesy to inform us before declaring a holiday. Their decision to act unilaterally cannot be tolerated." The education minister was backed by the State President D. V. Sadananda Gowda, who issued a statement in which he stated that Christian education institutions had committed a crime by declaring a holiday without obtaining the state government's permission. However, the Indian National Congress (INC) condemned Hegde's statement to take action against Christian education institutions and the leader of the Opposition in the Legislative Assembly, Mallikarjun Kharge, stated that "The minister's statement is not proper. It may lead to law and order problem in the State." Bajrang Dal proponents protested with banners outside the St. Aloysius College gates and across Mangalore on Saturday 31 August, the day after the college had closed for a holiday, chanting slogans such as, "Jai Mata Di" (Hail to the Mother) and "Bharat Mata ki jai" (Hail Mother India). The closure of the schools in Mangalore were not alone; some 45,000 institutions across India had participated on 29 August in a "prayer for peace and communal harmony" in response to the events in Orissa.

Another explanation is that the attacks were an angry response by Bajrang Dal over the allegations that the New Life Fellowship Trust were indulging in forceful religious conversion of Hindus and distribution of vulgar literature slandering Hindu gods and goddesses. Bajrang Dal claimed that nearly 15,000 people had been forced to adopt Christianity as their religion in Mangalore alone in the past year after monitoring the situation. In the book Satyadarshini, written by Andhra Pradesh Pastor Paravastu Suryanarayana Rao, it was alleged that New Life Fellowship Trust had denigrated and defamed Hindu gods, causing anger amongst the Bajrang Dal. Hindu activists also alleged that excerpts from Rao's book had been published in pamphlets to spread its influence. Mahila Parishat leader Asha Jagadish claimed the attacks were solely motivated by religious conversions by New Life and claimed that her neighbour was forcefully converted into Christianity to marry a Christian girl, further stating, "The Holy Saint School in Bangalore, where I studied up to fifth standard, did not allow me to wear kumkum or bangles according to Hindu tradition." Fr. Francis Serrao, rector of St. Aloysius College, stated that he believed the attacks were not due to conversion, but was rather a reflection of the struggle between Christianity and Brahmanism and theorised that Christian ideology and Brahmin ideology can never coexist as "Christianity propagates love and Brahmanism propagates hate."

== Attacks ==
Incidents of violence against Christians had been reported during the month prior to the main attacks. On 17 August 2008, demonstrators performed a dharna (hunger strike) outside the DHM church in Jayanagar, Davangere and again on 24 August at Nitya Jeeva Devalaya church, burning Christian literature in both events. No complaints or arrests were made in either of the events. Three days later, on 27 August, a Christian prayer hall and its pastor in Uchangidurga, Harpanahalli taluk of the Davanagere district, were attacked, leading to eight arrests. Then on 7 September, a group of about 300 individuals attacked the Yesu Kripalaya Church in Bada, Davangere district, vandalising it and burning the Bibles. Ten people were arrested at the scene in Bada. The multiple premeditated attacks started on 14 September 2008, with some 20 churches attacked in Karnataka; of which 14 were attacked within one hour. These included Catholic and Protestant churches as well as temples belonging to the Jehovah's Witnesses and the New Life Fellowship Trust. The attacks began when a group of some 15 youths on motorbikes from the Bajrang Dal, a Hindutva militant organisation which aims to achieve the "reversing of the invasions by Muslim conquerors and British imperialism", arrived at the chapel of the Adoration Monastery of the Sisters of St Clare in Hampankatta around 10.15 am, shouting a pro-Bajrang Dal slogan. They entered the monastery and attacked it with lathis, desecrating the tabernacle and the Eucharist, the 15 feet (5 m) high golden coloured monstrance (regarded by the nuns as the most sacred object in the church), a crucifix, the oil lamps, the vases on the altar, and a few statues of saints. A couple praying in the chapel at the time were also beaten by the intruders. Two nuns were also reportedly injured. Around the same time, a group of 30 to 35 people on motorbikes wearing masks attacked the empty Church of South India building at Kodaikal, armed with iron pipes, cricket stumps and sticks, shouting pro-Bajrang Dal slogans. Aside from damage to the buildings, windows and religious iconography, furniture, Bibles, and other Christian literature were damaged in various churches. A gang of about 30 youths had made an attempt to ransack a prayer hall of the New Life Fellowship Trust, but their efforts were thwarted by the police.

St Ann's Friary Grotto after it was desecrated on 14 September

Around 8.30 pm on 14 September 2008, miscreants pelted stones at the chapel of Padua Pre-University College, a Christian college located at Nanthoor, badly damaging its windows. Around 9.30 pm, miscreants badly damaged a statue located in front of Carmelites' house in Katkere, near Koteshwar. The Church of St. Sebastian in Permannur was badly damaged, including its windows and furniture. Holy Cross Church (at Kulshekar) and St. Joseph, The Worker Church (at Vamanjoor) were also damaged. Police reports confirmed that Our Lady's Grotto at Vijayamarie Technical Institute and properties at the Infant Jesus Higher Primary School and Mary Hill Convent were also damaged by the miscreants on the night of 14 September. Pastor K. A. Abraham of Divine Deliverance Prayer Centre at Neerugadde in Shiroor said that more than 25 miscreants had attacked his prayer hall, and they were reported to have smashed the window panes, ransacked equipment and set a motorcycle and car on fire.

Later, during the early morning hours of 15 September, individuals broke into the St. George Church belonging to the Syro Malabar Catholic Rite of the Belthangady Diocese in Ujire, Dakshina Kannada district, 70 km from Mangalore and burned the Bible, the carpet, prayer books and desecrated holy icons. Miscreants also ransacked the St. Thomas Church in Gorigandi in Chikkamagaluru district. Seven or eight masked men arriving on scooters were reported to have desecrated the large statue of St. Antony at St. Ann's Friary on Jail Road in Bejai, throwing flower pots to smash the glass covering. The official report into the attacks^{[a]} later claimed that the Bajrang Dal were the likely suspects for the attacks on churches in Chikkamagaluru district, including the Christian Believers' Prayer Hall, Jagadeshwara Church in Mudigere and Carmel Mathe Devalaya in Kudremukh, and had also harassed people gathered at Kapitanio High School in Mangalore. Several people also reportedly invaded the house and prayer meeting of a neo-convert in Singatagere of Kadur taluk. Other areas affected by the attacks include Kalkanady, Falnir, Madyanthar, Makodu, Singatagere, Jayapura, Shaktinagar, Thokottu, Bantwal, Belthangady, Udupi, Kulur, Kundapura, Karkala, Koppa, Balehanoor and Moodbidri. Individuals were also targeted during the event. In Kulur, two men and two children were attacked by a Hindu mob near Gurupur Bridge while on their way to their hometown in a private car, and in Kalladka, the Souza Textile owner and his wife were attacked by unidentified people. Two separate stabbing incidents were also reported in Kalladka, and the two men affected were admitted to hospital with serious injuries.

On 16 September, a 100-year-old statue of Mary at St Mary's Church in Kolar was damaged by vandals, St George's Church in Ernody was desecrated and attempted to be burned by vandals, and over 20 vandals desecrated the Rima Worship Centre at Adyar. On 18 September, vandals shattered the glass encasing of the Mother Mary statue of the Presentation Girls School in Dharwad and on 19 September, a gang of vandals on motorbikes pelted stones at the St. Xavier's Church in Padu Kody in Mangalore taluk and destroyed the statues. On 21 September, a further four attacks were reported, including Brethren Christa Aaradhanalaya prayer hall near Nellihudikeri in Kodagu district, the Believers' Church in Yedapadavu, Mangalore taluk, and two churches in Bangalore; St. James Church in Mariyannapalya near Hebbal and Lumbini Gardens, which had two gold plated crowns and cash from the offering box stolen and the main sacrament vandalised; and the Holy Church in the Name of Jesus at Rajarajeshwarinagar had the casing around the Infant Jesus smashed and the statue damaged. In Banaswadi, a group reportedly pelted stones at a church and fled. A Catholic school was also attacked in Kasaragod district in Kerala. Between 15 September and 10 October, Hindu nationalists directed a wave of attacks targeting Christian communities in Kerala, Madhya Pradesh, Uttar Pradesh, Andhra Pradesh, Bihar, Chhattisgarh, Jharkhand, New Delhi, Punjab, Tamil Nadu and Uttarakhand, and Muslim communities in Gujarat and Maharashtra.

=== Christian protests ===
Christians erupted in protests in Mangalore, following the attacks on their religious institutions.

In response to the attacks in areas such as Hampankatta, Shaktinagar, Vamanjoor, Thokottu and Bantwal, the Christian community began protesting. The protestors blocked arterial city roads in their masses, especially in places such as Hampankatta, Kulshekar, Bejai, Derebail and Thokottu and rang bells in almost all the churches of the city, calling parishioners to their churches. In Hampankatta, over 4,000 Christians united to defend the Milagres Church and protest. Violence broke out at the Adoration monastery as police began caning the protestors with sticks and bursting teargas shells to disperse them, while they pelted stones at police vans and police. The police were reported to have caused further damage to the Adoration monastery by throwing back stones and glass bottles to restrain the protestors. Union Minister of Labour and Employment Oscar Fernandes and MLA B. Ramanath Rai arrived at the Hampankatta scene at 6 pm. The Catholics of Karkala deanery staged a protest on 15 September condemning the attacks and the desecration of the crucifix and sacrament at Adoration Monastery in particular and organised a 3 kilometre silent protest march from the bus stand to the taluk headquarters and submitted a memorandum to tehsildar Laxman Singh.

The protests involved over 2,500 people and among those present were incumbent parish priest John Barboza, Valerian Fernandes, Ajekar parish priest Valerian Fernandes, Attur parish priest Arthur Pereira, Miyar parish priest Ronald Miranda, Paschal Menezes, Parappady parish priest Alex Aranha, Michael D'Silva, Hirgan parish priest Michael Lobo, Kanajar parish priest Alwyn D'Cunha and many other priests and nuns in the area. The Christian protestors also clashed with police at St Sebastian Church in the Permannur area of Ullal on the outskirts of Mangalore, shouting slogans and throwing stones at the police for their failure to arrest the perpetrators of the attacks. The police arrested several Christians after firing into the air and being involved in a lathi charge. Four people of pro-Hindu organisations were reportedly injured at Kalladka and Attavar on the outskirts of the Mangalore when their vehicles were attacked and were pelted with stones by a mob. Ten people, including one of the Sri Ram Sena activists, were reportedly stabbed during the protests and according to the police, the situation was used by some to settle personal scores and not all stabbing incidents were related to attack on churches and the subsequent violence in the city. The Sri Ram Sena protested against the stabbing of one of their activists by organising a shutdown of educational institutions and shops. The district administration responded by declaring a holiday for all educational institutions in Mangalore taluk, and extended prohibitory orders under the Section 144 Criminal Procedure Code for two more days in the wake of the attacks and protests as a precaution.

More than two dozen Christians were initially arrested by the police during the Adoration incident, in comparison to seven young members of the Bajrang Dal who had initiated the attacks. Chief Minister B. S. Yeddyurappa later stated in a press conference that a total of 153 people had been arrested during the attacks and resultant protests within a two-day period and that some had been charged with looting, arson and rioting, saying that they would be "punished in accordance with the provisions of the law under they were charged." The BBC reported that over 170 people had been arrested during the events. However, Superintendent of Police in Mangalore, N. Satheesh Kumar, claimed to have made just 89 arrests in total. Four policemen, half a dozen people and journalist Anil Jogi were reportedly injured in the Adoration incident, and three police vehicles damaged. The police stated that over 30 people were injured and eight police vehicles had been damaged in the overall attacks, and that nearly 40 people and 20 police were injured in the attacks in total. Several of the injured were taken to Father Muller Medical College and Wenlock District Hospital. Although three churches were attacked in neighbouring Udupi district, it remained peaceful during the aftermath.

Many congregations gathered in their churches upon hearing news of the attacks, volunteering to spend the night there to protect them from further attacks. Local Catholic leaders demanded a peaceful bandh on 15 September in and around the city of Mangalore, and as a response Catholic traders and transport owners closed their shops and stopped their vehicles. A memorandum was submitted to the district council at 10.30 am, seeking protection for the lives and property of Christians. Prayers were to be held in all the 48 churches of the district on Wednesday, 17 September. On 6 October 2008, some 10,000 people from civil society and religious organisations organised a march to protest against the anti-Christian perpetrators of the attacks.

=== Reports of state and police misconduct ===
Aftermath of the attacks

The Christian community of Mangalore accused the police of doing nothing to prevent attacks by Hindu radicals. Mangalore Police Superintendent N. Satheesh Kumar himself admitted that the police did have information that pro-Hindu organisations were planning to attack Christian places of worship in the district, but failed to do anything about it. The Christian community accused the Bharatiya Janata Party (BJP) government under B. S. Yeddyurappa of involvement in the attacks and backing the anti-Christian campaigns.^{[b]} In response to the report that the police had information, Fr. Henry Sequeira, chancellor of the Mangalore Diocese said, "If the police knew about this in advance and still could not prevent the attacks, then we have no hope." However, Superintendent Kumar had made security arrangements near the New Life Prayer Centre in Kankanady and had successfully barred the miscreants from entering and vandalising the centre at that particular location, leading to a violent conflict with the police. The police were criticised by Christians for using excessive force in suppressing the protests and aggressively subduing Christian protesters whilst failing to punish the offending Hindu nationalist perpetrators; photographs and video footage has emerged of the beating of some of the protestors with canes. Caning by the police was also reported at Panemangalore and Farangipet.

Phelix D'Souza, a resident of Permannur, alleged that the police took him into custody and tortured him and opened a baseless case against him, sending him to jail for 11 days. Lance Rego, a Mangalore resident, claimed that "many of the police personnel who entered the premises of Holy Cross Church at Kulshekar were wearing helmets usually worn by two-wheeler drivers and not the ones meant for police personnel. Hence, I wonder whether they were police personnel or cadres of the Bajrang Dal." Another resident, Marcel Henry Ferao, alleged that "prohibitory orders were imposed on those who were inside the church compound and not on the Bajrang Dal cadres who were outside the church compound and were pelting stones". Dinal Saldanha of Kulshekar alleged that the police used tear-gas shells which were past their expiry date on the premises, and that exposure to the gas resulted in problems with her eyesight. Many Catholic women reported incidents of police violence to the Deputy Commissioner M. Maheshwar Rao and other government officials, revealing their bruises, and demanding that action be taken against them.

The police crackdown on protesters in Vamanjoor

Girija Vyas, President of the National Commission for Women (NCW), met with the affected women of Mangalore and visited various hospitals, schools and parishes in the area, and expressed concern at the way in which the police had handled the event. Two police constables, Nandakumar and Shivaram, were suspended following a stone throwing incident within Siddapura police jurisdiction, in which windows of a church had been smashed. Chief Minister of State Yeddyurappa stated that senior civil and police officials of the districts would be held responsible if attacks on churches and prayer halls occurred in areas under their jurisdiction, further stating: "Strict action will be taken against you [the police] without fear or favour". In Dakshina Kanada district, community members reported that the administration had attempted to have Superintendent of Police N. Satish Kumar transferred. However, the official report into the attacks initiated by the government, released in January 2011, contradicted this and stated "the impression and allegations that the top police officers and the district administration had colluded with the attackers in attacking the churches or places of worship has no merit. The concerned police in all districts did their best and have been successful in nabbing most of such miscreants and large number of charge-sheets have been filed in various courts which have to finally adjudicate their identity."

Mahendra Kumar, the former state convener of the Bajrang Dal, claimed that he was incarcerated for 42 days in Mangalore before being released on conditional bail by Karnataka High Court Justice Ashok B. Hinchigeri on 25 October 2008, and was used as a scapegoat by the BJP regime to "save the government from further embarrassment after the church attacks and on instructions from the Sangh Parivar leaders. The police had originally protested against his being released on bail, a week after the attacks. Kumar stated that the BJP government in permitting the attacks had "fallen low on values and is engrossed in corruption."

== Reactions ==
=== Political response ===
B. S. Yeddyurappa, then Chief Minister of Karnataka, was accused of involvement in the attacks, but strongly denied it, stating that his government was "committed to maintaining peace and harmony in the state."

Prime Minister Manmohan Singh spoke to Karnataka Governor Rameshwar Thakur and Chief Minister B. S. Yeddyurappa by phone from his Delhi residence in the aftermath of the attacks on churches and Christians, and expressed shock at the attacks. He directed the chief minister to take immediate steps to provide ample protection to religious institutions and maintain communal harmony. The Udupi district Congress committee submitted a memorandum to Deputy Commissioner P. Hemalatha, demanding that the state government initiate legal action and punish the culprits of the attacks. The Congress party opposition leader Mallikarjun Kharge said, "The BJP is responsible for the attacks. It is creating social disharmony" further adding that they were "actively inciting further violence" against Christians in the state. Special Home Secretary M. L. Kumawat visited some of the areas affected by the attacks and said that the state government "needs to do more and arrest all those responsible for the attacks."

Yeddyurappa strongly denied any involvement of his government in the attacks, but admitted that the police were to blame for not taking precautionary measures, describing it as a "dereliction of duty". He believed the attacks were a response from "some vested interest trying to tarnish the secular image of his government". He said at the press conference, "My government is committed to maintaining peace and harmony in the state; law and order has been top priority by my government.... Nobody is above law, irrespective of caste and creed the culprits will be punished". The state government ensured that special security was given to important places of worship throughout the state in the aftermath of the attacks and Yeddyurappa set up a corps of detectives to investigate. He promised Christian community leaders that all churches and shrines vandalised in the districts of Dakshina Kannada, Udupi, and Chikkamagaluru during the attacks would be restored and paid a visit to all of the areas affected by communal riots and attacks. Some politicians such as former Prime Minister and Janata Dal (Secular) (JDS) national president H.D. Deve Gowda and M. P. Prakash also visited the Christian institutions in the aftermath. In February 2010, Yeddyurappa allocated ₹500 millions for Christian development projects in Karnataka in his state budget, the first time he had ever done so.

"After my government come into power, I first met the Bishop of Mangalore and other Muslim leaders, and asked them for unity among all religions. We have to stop all misunderstandings between religions. We have to treat each and every citizen equally. Whoever takes law into their hands should be punished. I strongly condemn this act against the Catholic churches. Karnataka is famous for peace and we need to maintain peace in this state. This incident should not occur again."

— Statement by B. S. Yeddyurappa

The Home Ministry advised the Karnataka government to do all it could in its power to prevent the recurrence of the attacks and to restore faith in the authorities in the region, asking for them to strongly suppress violence and vandalism and to punish the offenders. Senior BJP leader L. K. Advani, during his two-day visit to Assam and Meghalaya, denounced the attacks in Orissa and Karnataka, saying," I strongly condemn these acts of violence and vandalism. The law must take its course and the culprits must be brought to justice." Former defence minister George Fernandes wrote to Yeddyurappa urging him to restore peace and challenging radicals to prove alleged conversions. Deve Gowda wrote a letter to Prime Minister Manmohan Singh asking for him to impose a "blanket ban" on the Bajrang Dal and Sri Ram Sena in the wake of the attacks, remarking that it "would send a categorical message across the world that secular India will not tolerate fascism, fanaticism and fundamentalism of any colour or kind." He described the attacks as nothing but "state sponsored rowdism", and accused the Karnataka government of trying to turn the state into a "Hindutva laboratory".

=== Religious response ===
"The church and the entire Christian community not only in Karnataka but all over India and even abroad is terribly angry and upset at the desecration of its sacred places, especially the blessed sacrament in the sanctum sanctorum, which is the Living Body of Christ. For Christians, the blessed sacrament is the most holy religious symbol signifying the body and blood of Christ. I am prepared to shed blood and give my life for the cause of Christ and Christians."

— Archbishop of Bangalore Archdiocese, Bernard Moras, expressing his outrage to B.S. Yeddyurappa

The Bishop of Mangalore Diocese Aloysius Paul D'Souza stated that Christians were "deeply hurt" over the desecration of the Holy Cross and Sacred Sacrament in the Adoration monastery. The Archbishop of Bangalore Archdiocese, Bernard Moras, who met with Yeddyurappa in the aftermath of the attacks said, "I want to tell you, Mr. Yeddyurappa we are wounded!" Fr. William Menezes, the public relations officer of the Mangalore Diocese, said: "After consulting various leaders and based on the assurance given by Chief Minister B. S. Yeddyurappa, district in-charge Minister J. Krishna Palemar, the police and district administration, we hereby appeal to our community to stop agitation immediately to maintain peace." Fr. Prashant Madtha, former principal of St. Aloysius College said in response to the attacks and resultant protests, "The retaliation from the Christian community you saw was happening for the very first time in the history of the state. It was not the correct response, I condemn it, but then our youth have started imitating the enemy. There is a lot of fear. We don't know when the stones will rain on our roofs. We are even scared to talk." Fr. Joseph Valiaparambil, Bishop of Belthangady, also said that Christian community of Belthangady was deeply hurt and shocked at the attacks, saying that "We strongly condemn the act. We are not violent and do not believe in violence. We respect the administration and the law of the country. We respect all religions. We, the Christian minority community, need protection from kinds of anti-social, anti-religious activities". The community leaders in a press conference also appealed internationally, stating "we want to bring to the notice of the world and human right commissions and authorities in Canada to use their diplomatic channels about the total collapse of law and order in Mangalore and other parts of India, and the failure of the state to protect the lives of the clergy and the minority community".

Joseph Dias, General Secretary of the Mumbai-based Catholic Secular Forum (CSF), visited most of the churches attacked in Karnataka during the event and said:

"The vested political and economic interests are hitting back with vengeance. Christians are sitting ducks, where no or negligible retaliation expected. The Church works in areas, where even the government dares not to go because it is not profitable. The Church's education, healthcare and social services in these backward areas has empowered the weak, poor and deprived vested interests of vote banks and cheap labour. The emancipation through education, healthcare, awareness of alternatives and provision of opportunities have set the oppressed classes free from the clutches of the upper caste or rich Hindus and slavery of their political masters. These interests are therefore hitting back at the Christians to maintain their hold on those, whom they have been exploiting since ages... We condemn those indulging in conversion by force or inducement. Catholics do not accept a conversion, unless it comes from the heart. But the saffron brigade raises this bogey, since in believes in Geobbels's (Nazi Propaganda Chief Joseph Goebbels) [sic] principle of repeating a lie umpteen times, so that it will stick. Another ploy is to divide us into Catholics and Protestants, so that they can divide and rule. This makes it easy for Hindutva radicals to take the remaining Christian population. Those who criticise groups that convert by inducement, must realise that an individual, who converts, will do so only if he finds his previous religion with limitations and Christianity a better faith."

Indian Christian expatriates in the Middle East united to condemn the attacks. In Kuwait City, Indian Catholics met in Holy Family Cathedral, Kuwait under Reverend Fr. Melwyn D'Cunha on 15 September to voice their support to the Catholic community in Mangalore. They held a special "Prayer Service for Peace & Solidarity" on 18 September at the Cathedral auditorium. In Doha, Qatar, advisory and executive committee members of the Mangalore Cultural Association met on 17 September at the residence of Felix Lobo and denounced the attacks. In the United States on 17 September, many Christian leaders from various organisations met at the residence of Bishop, Rt. Rev. Dr. Jacob Angadiath of Syro Malabar Catholic Mission (SMCC) and announced a day of prayer vigil, fasting and a peace rally at the Syro Malabar Cathedral in Bellwood, Illinois on 28 September. Fr. George Madathiprambil, Vicar General of the Diocese, urged all Christians to "unite under one umbrella", and Jos Anthony Puthenveetil, the Regional Vice-President of FIACONA, urged the communities to unite, regardless of religions. Rev. M. J. Thomas of the Church of South India said "since many Indian Churches and American local Churches are expected to join in the peace seeking rally, this will be a history making event." Various Hindu leaders, including those from Ayodhya, also denounced the attacks.

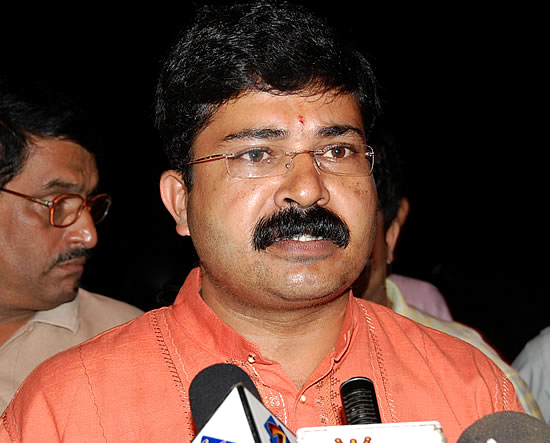
Mahendra Kumar, then Bajrang Dal state convener, reportedly claimed responsibility for the attacks on New Life prayer halls and formally apologised for the incident in February 2011.

Bajrang Dal leader Mahendra Kumar denied any attack on Catholic churches by his group but reportedly accepted responsibility for the attacks on prayer halls belonging to the New Life Fellowship Trust. He stated that the Bajrang Dal were not against Christianity in the region, but were offended by the alleged forced conversions. Kumar had initially denied any involvement in the attacks before being arrested on 20 September. When asked again at a later date however if he had accepted responsibility for the attacks, he denied it. Kumar resigned from Bajrang Dal on 1 October 2008 after witnessing a Hindu woman who had decided to commit suicide with her three children but was saved by Christian missionaries. He stated "That was the time I realised that life is more important than dharma (religion). A lot needs to be done for the betterment of life. My dream is to build a society that values life more than religion. In jail I read several literary works. I joined Bajrang Dal so that we could mobilise the youth for a good cause, but at the end of the day all our concepts were politically motivated." In February 2011, after the commission reports into the attacks were published, Kumar formally apologised to the public for the attacks and accused the BJP Government of corruption. On 21 February 2011 he joined the JDS, declaring, "I am today shedding the shackles of communalism to strive for communal harmony, for which the JDS is working." His successor, Suryanarayana, also denied any involvement in the attacks. Some pro-Hindu elements believed that the attacks were politically motivated by the main opposition parties in the state rather than being purely based upon religious indifference, especially the Milagres Church attack.

In response to the alleged forced conversions, the VHP gave a 3-month deadline for New Life Fellowship Trust to stop all conversion activities in Mangalore. Bishop D'Souza declared that the Mangalore Diocese would distance itself from the New Life Fellowship Trust, stating that the "Catholic Church does not believe in forceful religious conversion". However, this was opposed by Margaret Alva, General Secretary of the All India Congress Committee (AICC). She stated, "Christians were a microscopic minority in India. We must put aside the differences between our various sects and come together to fight fascist forces." She further described the stance taken by the diocese as "improper". Alva also objected to the peace agreement between the local Catholic leadership and the VHP in which the latter had allegedly laid down a code of ethics for the Christians to follow, and remarked that "the Indian Constitution is the only code of ethics for all Indians". An investigation in the Udupi district headed by Mohammad Shafi Qureshi, Chairman of the National Commission for Minorities (NCM), failed to discover any evidence of forced conversion. Qureshi stated that his commission had not received any report of forced conversion from the district administration of Udupi district and said, "Every Indian had the right to profess and propagate any religion. Conversion by force is not permitted".

== Investigations ==
An initial report by a committee, composed of some 17 human rights activists from Orissa, Andhra Pradesh, Tamil Nadu, Puducherry, Karnataka and Maharashtra, which formed to look into the violence in Mangalore, stated that the attacks were carried out by the Bajrang Dal and the Sri Ram Sena. They asserted that the event was a "pretext by the police to let loose a savage assault on the community and its sacred institutions", and that the police "conducted themselves as activists of the Bajrang Dal and not as officers of the law, under the benign gaze of the friendly state government." The police were reported to be "more interested in interrogating the nuns than in investigating the assaults." The National Commission for Minorities asked for a ban on the Bajrang Dal, after conducting reports into events in Orissa and Karnataka.

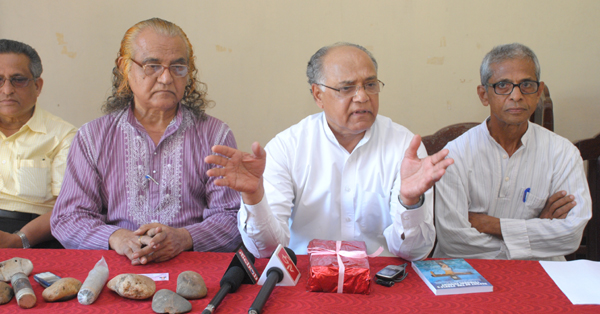
M. F. Saldanha (centre), head of the Saldanha Commission

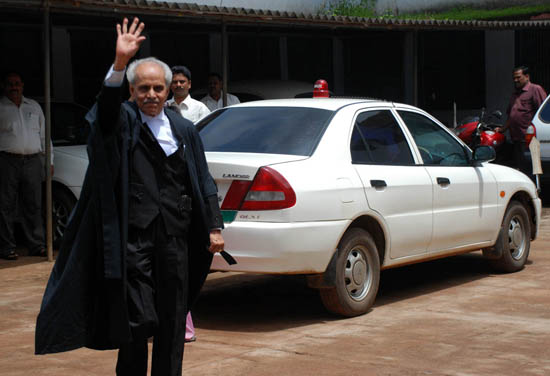
B. K. Somasekhara, who led the commission initiated by Yeddyurappa's BJP-led state government into the attacks

Retired Justice M. F. Saldanha, formerly of the Bombay High Court, was outspoken against the protests and published a report in 2011 investigating the attacks on Christian institutions and people, written up after he visited 413 locations, examined 673 witnesses and 2,114 victims of the attacks. He described the attacks as "state-sponsored terrorism", and concluded that "the attacks and incidents which took place were instigated and pre-planned. They were not only supported by the state, but were also covered up for by the state." The report also stated, "The responsibility for this devolves squarely on Home Minister V. S. Acharya and the Chief Minister B S Yediyurappa". Saldanha believes that the "communal forces" at work attacking Christian institutions are also part of an anti-Islam movement on the coastal belt of India. This idea was later backed by Joseph Dias of the Catholic Secular Forum, who said that the Karnataka riots were "part of a wider plan of radical Hindutva elements targeting the Christian community after the Muslim community", which had manifested in all of the BJP-ruled states of India. Saldanha further stated, "There is 100 per cent evidence of two things: the state machinery and the police had a role in attacks on churches. There is videographic and photographic evidence of police entering places of worship."

The official commission enquiring into the attacks on Christians, originally constituted on 19 September 2009 for a period of three months, had been extended ten times, causing dismay amongst local Christians. Yeddyurappa initially stated that a judicial inquiry into the attacks was unnecessary, as he believed that the state police were competent enough to investigate and bring the perpetrators to justice themselves. Jesuit priest Fr. M. K. George remarked that "The government does not seem to be serious about the early release of the commission report... the government is lacking the political will to act". Rev. Manohar Chandra Prasad criticised the government for "soft pedaling" and believed that the extension was an indication of the government's "step-motherly" attitude toward Christians. The official report of Justice B. K. Somasekhara, initiated by Yeddyurappa's BJP-led state government was eventually made public in January 2011, in which it stated that the attacks were suspected to have been initiated by the Bajrang Dal, denying any involvement of the state government and the police, "true Hindus", or any cover-up in the attacks after collecting 2,204 exhibits and 30 materials related to the attacks, 25 spot inspections and examining attacks on 57 churches in Karnataka. The report stated, "There is no basis to apprehension of Christian petitioners that politicians, BJP, mainstream Sangh Parivar and State Government directly or indirectly are involved in the attacks. No politicians or representative of any political party in the state who politicised the incidents of attack for their benefits immediately did not come before the commission with their affidavits or to give evidence or opinion in the matter." The report—which cost around ₹30 million and took over 28 months, 300 sittings, and 800 pieces of recorded evidence to be realised—concluded that the district authorities and the police had, in most cases, taken the "appropriate steps regarding the Church and the people including the required protection." Somasekhara concluded that the attacks were "carried out by 'misguided elements' following circulation of literature insulting Hindu gods and reports of conversion activity by some Christian groups" and that "the Roman Catholic church and its leaders were not involved in conversion." In the case of Chikkamagaluru district, Somasekhara noted that "the Government may enquire and withdraw the privileges to every people who is indulging or getting converted in such illegal activities of conversions commercially." The report was widely criticised by the Christian community for being "biased" and activists belonging to the Religious Christian Minority Wing of the JDS burnt a copy of the Somasekhara report. Archbishop of Bangalore Archdiocese Bernard Moras rejected the Somasekhara report, stating, "It has failed to address the terms of reference of the Commission and has failed to do justice to the Christian community." He demanded that the state government launch a Central Bureau of Investigation probe into the attacks, also saying that "we will make a representation to the government putting forth our demand. We will make a representation to the chief minister, the governor, various organisations including the Human Rights and the Central government". Bajrang Dal State convener Suryanarayana also disputed the veracity of the Somasekhara report in its statements about the Bajrang Dal involvement and former Bajrang Dal state convener Mahendra Kumar. He issued a statement saying that "Bajrang Dal had no role to play in the incidents of attacks on churches and the statement given by Mr. Kumar during the attacks in 2008 were his personal views and the organisation had clarified this aspect then. However, Uday Kumar Shetty, the president of the district unit of the BJP, approved of the report, believing that the report was correct in its assertion that the Sangh Parivar were not involved in the attacks.

== 2011 protest ==
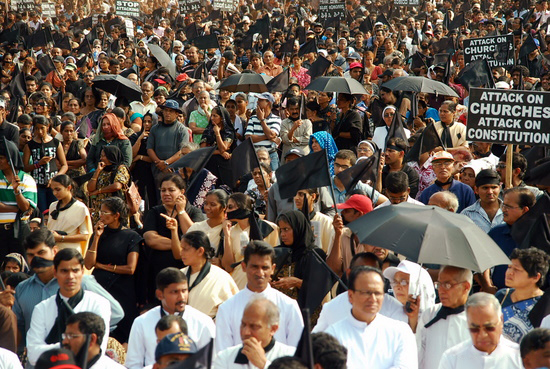
Christians of all denominations protested against the Somasekhara Commission report in Mangalore on 20 February 2011.

On 20 February 2011, following the publication of Saldanha's and Somasekhara's contradictory reports on the attacks on churches, more than 100,000 Christians representing some 45 Christian denominations and secular organisations gathered in Mangalore to protest. Present was Bishop Aloysius Paul D'Souza of Mangalore Diocese, Bishop Emeritus C. L. Furtado and Bishop John S. Sadananda of the CSI Karnataka Southern Diocese, AICC general secretary Oscar Fernandes, Bishop Lawrence Mukkuzhy of the Catholic Syro-Malabar Diocese of Belthangady, Geevarghese Mar Divannasious of the Syro-Malankara Diocese of Puttur, Diocesan Vicar-General Msgr Denis M. Prabhu; and some 24 new-generation churches united under the Karnataka Missions Network (KMN) including the Campus Crusade for Christ (CCC), Operation Mobilization Bookstall (OMB), Good News Book Centre (GNBC), All India Catholic Union (AICU), Catholic Association of South Kanara (CASK), and International Federation of Karnataka Christian Associations (IFKCA). Secular organisations participating in the protest included Udupi Jilla Alpasankhyatara Vedike (UJAV), the People's Union for Civil Liberties (PUCL), the DK District Committee, the local unit of the Democratic Youth Federation of India (DYFI), and the Muslim Vartakara Sangha (VS) and Muslim Okkoota groups. The protest rally was "organised against a backdrop of an apparent whitewash by the B. K. Somasekhara Commission concerning Hindu radicals and government agencies." The protesters tied black cloths over their mouths and carried black flags as they walked silently for about a kilometre in one of the strongest Christian areas of the city. George Castelino, a Catholic lay leader who guided the march, stated that the black "symbolised that the action of the government and its commission have silenced Christians." Rev. Alwyn Culaso of the Full Gospel Church said that "This is a sea of Christianity that is wounded by the attacks on the churches by the fundamental groups. The government should look at the faith and patience of these people and give justice." On 17 February 2011, Ronald Colaco, Chairman of IFKCA and Higher Education Minister V. S. Acharya submitted a memorandum to Yeddyurappa, demanding that the cases filed against Christian youths be dropped.

Following the publications of the reports and subsequent protests, the government of Karnataka announced that it would drop 338 cases against Christians who had protested in the attacks. In December 2011, 23 cases against Christians were dropped upon request by the Karnataka Christians International and the Mangalore Diocese.

== Footnotes ==
a The report of the Somasekhara Commission appointed on January 2011 by the BJP state government to investigate the attacks.
b BJP came to power in a coalition with JDS in January 2006. The coalition collapsed in September 2007, and BJP regained power in May 2008.

== See also ==
- Anti-Christian violence in India
- 2008 anti-Christian attacks in Orissa
- Religious violence in Orissa
- 1998 attacks on Christians in southeastern Gujarat
- Jhabua nuns rape case
- 2021 anti-Christian violence in Karnataka

== Bibliography ==
- Chatterji, Angana P. (2009). Violent gods: Hindu nationalism in India's present : narratives from Orissa. Gurgaon, India: Three Essays Collective. ISBN 978-81-88789-67-2..
- Prabhu, Alan Machado (1999). Sarasvati's Children: A History of the Mangalorean Christians. Bangalore: I.J.A. Publications. ISBN 978-81-86778-25-8..
- Varghese, Alexander P. (2008). India: History, Religion, Vision And Contribution to the World. Atlantic Publishers & Dist. ISBN 978-81-269-0903-2.
- "History" (PDF). South Kanara District Gazetteer (3.7 MB). Karnataka State Gazetteer. Vol. 12. Bangalore: Gazetteer Department (Government of Karnataka). 1973. pp. 33–85. OCLC 311367277.
