= Lucky Draw 777 =

Konkani-language comedy movie released in 2023

- Directed by: Rayan Magneto
- Written by: Rayan Magneto
- Produced by: Rayan Magneto
- Starring: Kelvin Saldanha; Lucy Lobo Aranha Gurpur; Rayan Magneto; Leston Lestu; Rishal Permannur; Joylin D'Souza Niddodi; Dr. Melwyn Pernal; Alwyn Danthy Pernal; Louis Pinto Kateel
- Cinematography: Stany Niddodi; Alwyn Sequeira; Naizil Rodrigues; Jeevan Dcosta; Hanson Rodrigues
- Edited by: Rayan Magneto
- Music by: Russel Rodrigues
- Production company: Rayan Magneto Films Trending Shield
- Release date: 2 September 2023 (Mangalore)
- Running time: 105 minutes
- Country: India
- Language: Konkani

Lucky Draw is a 2023 Indian Konkani-language comedy film written, edited, directed and produced by Rayan Magneto under the banner of Rayan Magneto Films and Trending Shield. The film stars Kelvin Saldanha, Lucy lobo Aranha, Rayan Magneto, Leston Lestu and Rishal Permannur in the lead roles. The film's background score is composed by Russel Rodrigues, cinematography by Stany Niddodi and Alwyn Sequeira, and drone and additional cinematography by Naizil Rodrigues, Jeevan Dcosta and Hanson Rodrigues.

This is the debut film by Rayan Magneto after creating many YouTube comedy sketches under channel name Trending Shield TV along with friends Joel Rodrigues and Kelvin Saldanha.

== Plot ==
Three friends start a hunt for a ‘Lucky Draw 777’ ticket, which they jointly bought for a meagre amount of Rs 30 from an electronic store called ' Alex and Sons'. After realising they have won the draw, they come to know about their missing ticket.

As more people join in to ask for their share before claiming their prizes, there are struggles and confusion between them.

The story also depicts how self-centered the human race could be.

== Cast ==
- Kelvin Saldanha as Kellam
- Rayan Magneto as Rayan
- Leston Nazareth as Leston Lestu
- Lucy Lobo Aranha Gurpur as Pullubai
- Rishal Permannur as Sharrel
- Joylin D'Souza Niddodi as Joylin
- Aaron Prince as Sam
- Jonisha D'souza as Smitha
- Louis Pinto Kateel as Thomasam
- Dr. Melwyn Pernal as Pascalam
- Preetham Noronha Fajir as Preetham
- Prinson Mathias Kirem as Prinson
- Vinson Mathias Kirem as Vinson
- Preethi Mathias Kirem as Mother
- Alwyn Danthy Pernal as Gurkar Maxi

Along with Sharal D’souza, Alton Samuel Saldanha, Ohana bertilia pereira, Prem Saldanha, Stella Rodrigues.

=== Cameo appearances ===
- Velita Lobo

== Production ==
The Muhurat of the film was held on 10 December 2022 at Our Lady of Remedies Church Kirem, along with a first schedule of the film which was completed after six days of shooting between 12 and 17 December 2022.

As the film progressed, the majority of the shooting took place on Sundays and holidays due to the actors' availability. After 15 days of shooting, the filmmakers wrapped up the project. Several patchwork scenes were also reshot over two days on 26 and 28 March 2023.

The movie was shot using a Canon 5D Mark IV, a Canon EOS R and a Canon M50 Mark II, while drone shots were filmed using a DJI Mavic Mini 2.

== Music ==
Background Score for the film was composed by debutant Russel Rodrigues.

One instrumental title track is featured in the film.

The dubbing of the film was done by prominent konkani singer and composer Jaison J Sequeira at his studio Dennana Recording Co. He also served as the script analyst during the pre-production stages.

== Release ==
A houseful crowd attended the movie's premiere at Bharath Cinemas, Mangalore, on Tuesday, 2 September 2023 The Second Show was held on 10 September at Kirem Church Hall with over 600 attendees

The Third Show was held on 15 October 2023 at Our Lady of Fatima Church ground in Pernal which marks films 1000+ footfalls with just 3 screenings

The film had its first international debut on 28 January 2024 at Central Parkway Cinemas, Mississauga, Canada.

== Public Screenings ==
Public Screenings
Show No.	Date	Place	Audience (~)	Notes
2023
1	2 Sep 2023	Bharath Cinemas, Bejai, Mangalore	287	Premiere Show
2	10 Sep 2023	Kirem Church Hall, Damaskatte	600	
3	15 Oct 2023	Our Lady of Fatima Church Ground, Pernal	400	
4	29 Oct 2023	Miyar Multi Purpose Church Hall	450	
5	29 Oct 2023	Saint Teresa Church Ground, Paldane	600	
6	4 Nov 2023	Holy Angels School, Shirthady	200	
7	11 Nov 2023	Mother of Sorrows Church Hall, Udupi	200	
8	12 Nov 2023	St. Francis Xavier Church Hall, Mudarangadi	350	
9	18 Nov 2023	St. Francis Xavier Church, Bejai (Lourdes Ground)	400	
10	26 Nov 2023	Our Lady of Fatima Church Hall, Mundkur	100	
11	2 Dec 2023	Kinnigoli Church Hall	600	
12	3 Dec 2023	Holy Cross Church Hall, Manjottie	175	
13	9 Dec 2023	Pakala Hall, Manjarapalke (Bola )	300	
14	20 Dec 2023	Infant Jesus Church Grounds, Pilar	200	
2024
15	21 Jan 2024	Holy Family Church Grounds, Omzoor	400	
16	26 Jan 2024	St Sebastian Church, Permannur	800	
17	28 Jan 2024	Central Parkway Cinema, Mississauga, Canada	100	1st International show
18	10 Feb 2024	Our Lady of Lourdes Church Hall, Kanajar	400	
19	12 Feb 2024	Holy Cross Church Grounds, Taccode	400	
20	27 Jan 2024	"ALMIGHTY" Residence, Surathkal, Kana	70	
21	31 Mar 2024	Infant Jesus Church Grounds, Vamadapadav	400	
22	31 Mar 2024	Europe Premiere at Luxembourg	15	Special Community Show
23	6 Apr 2024	Our Lady of Health Church Grounds, Shirva	700	
24	20 Apr 2024	St. Ignatius Loyola Church Hall, Paladka	100	
25	27 June 2024	Mount Rosary Ashram, Alangar, Moodbidri	100	25th Show
26	22 Aug 2024	Infant Jesus Shrine, Bikkernakatta, Mangalore	150	
27	08 Sept 2024	St. Vincent De Paul Church, Katapady	400	
28	12 Sept 2024	Bharath Cinemas, Bejai, Mangalore	80	
29	15 Sept 2024	The Holy Cross Church Hall, Cordel, Kulshekar	1200	
30	27 Sept 2024	St Aloysius University, Mangalore	150	Special Show organised by Konkani Sangha
31	29 Sept 2024	St. Paul's Church Hall, Balkunje	300	
32	06 Oct 2024	Our Lady Of Pompei Church, Kaikamba	500	
33	20 Oct 2024	Mai de deus Church, Puttur	400	
34	10 Nov 2024	Holy saviour church hall, Agrar	350	
35	20 Nov 2024	Saint Philip Neri Church, Basrur	1100	
36	31 Dec 2024	St. Thomas Orthodox Syrian Church, Sastan	300	
2025
37	25 Jan 2025	St. Francis Xavier's Church, Saverapura	100	
38	01 Feb 2025	St. Francis Xavier's Church, Ferar	350	
39	02 Feb 2025	St. John the Baptist Church, Permude	300	
40	08 Feb 2025	Christ the King Church, Venoor	250	
41	09 Feb 2025	Our Lady of Perpetual Succour Church, Gantalkatte	225	
42	15 Feb 2025	Holy Rosary Church, Alangar	400	
43	16 Feb 2025	Holy Spirit Church, Sampige	175	
44	22 Feb 2025	Sacred Heart Church, Surathkal	200	
45	23 Feb 2025	St. Joseph Church, Bajpe	650	
46	26 Feb 2025	Holy Cross Church, Pamboor	550	
47	01 Mar 2025	Saldanha Residence Hall, Kateel	150	
48	01 Mar 2025	Church Of Sacred Heart Of Jesus, Madanthyar	450	
49	02 Mar 2025	Sacred Heart Of Jesus Church, Shamboor	300	
50	02 Mar 2025	St. Antony Church, Naravi	300	Half Century
51	20 Apr 2025	St Roque Church, Neerude	400	
52	20 Apr 2025	St. John the Evangelist Church, Pangla	600	
53	20 Apr 2025	Infant Mary Church, Katipalla	300	
54	26 Apr 2025	Our Lady Of Vailankanni Church, Farla	300	
55	4 May 2025	St. Joseph Church, Belman	300	
56	19 Apr 2026	Holy Cross Church, Hospet	300	
Total Footfalls			19,877	

== Reception ==
Roshu Bajpe of Kittal Konkani Magazine and Website wrote "Lucky Draw 777 is the movie that won't disappoint the Audience". He praised the courage and efforts by Rayan Magneto in taking the first steps towards fulfilling his movie dream. He commended the acting performances by the lead casts, especially by Carmine sequeira who managed to grab the audience by her small but impactful role

Hemacharya of Daijiworld stated that the film reminded him of a ‘Treasure Island’ the classic novel, by Robert Louis Stevenson. He applauded the strength and courage of a new comer's initiative against all odds and challenges. He commended the social message revolved around the story besides comedy and the way the surroundings of his native are shown in the film.

== Sequel ==
=== Fondacho Misther ===
Main article:

Fondacho Misther is a standalone sequel to the 2023 Konkani comedy film Lucky Draw 777. While featuring a refreshed cast and unexpected role reversals, the film also sees the return of a few fan-favorite actors from the original reprising their roles. The story centers around a curious incident that unfolds in a quiet village, leading to a series of comedic and dramatic events.

Plans for a sequel began soon after Lucky Draw 777 received positive responses during its public screenings, with audiences expressing strong interest in a continuation. Rayan Magneto, who served as the writer, director, and editor of the first film, returned to helm the project once again. Originally slated for a late 2024 release, the film was postponed due to production and budgetary delays, and then released on April 25, 2025, across Mangalore and Udupi.

== Digital Release ==
The film premiered on television on Daijiworld 24x7 on April 5 on the occasion of Easter 2026.

Following its television premiere, the film was officially released on YouTube on May 2 via the Trending Shield channel, making it accessible to audiences worldwide.

== See also ==
- Konkani cinema
