= Hirgan =

Hirgan may refer to:

- Hirgan, India
- Hirgan, Iran
