= Catholic Association of South Kanara =

Catholic Association of South Kanara (CASK), formerly South Kanara Catholic Association, is a Christian organisation based in Mangalore, India.

== Controversies ==
In September 1935, the association sent a memorandum to the Governor of Madras requesting withdrawal of concessions granted to villagers in Reserve Forests, involving Malayalees.

The association were involved in the aftermath of the 2008 attacks on Christians in southern Karnataka, and participated in the protest on 20 February 2011 against the report of the official investigation of Judge B. K. Somasekhara into the attacks. However, the president of Catholic Association of South Kanara, Dr Derek Lobo, filed a forgery case against Judge M. F. Saldanha, former Justice of the Bombay High Court, who conducted one of the investigations into the attacks and supported the denouncement of the Somasekhara report. This was condemned by the People's Union of Civil Liberties (PUCL) and NGOs from Dakshina Kannada; the PUCL called the association's action as "illegal, vicious, mala fide, motivated and vindictive", saying that "Justice Saldanha is regarded as one of the highly respected members of the Indian judiciary". In February 2012, the Income Tax Department accused CASK of tax evasion and ordered a probe into it.

== Functions ==
They meet annually at the St Aloysius High School. The association is also involved with theatrical pursuits, having put on a performance of Alan Machado (Prabhu's) Shades within Shadows at the auditorium of St Aloysius College, set during the time of the captivity of the Konkani Catholics in 1784.
