= International Federation of Karnataka Christian Associations =

- Abbreviation: IFKCA
- Founder: Ronald Colaco
- Purpose: Speak for Christians in Karnataka
- Region served: Karnataka, India
- President: Ronald Colaco
- Secretary: Michael Baptist

The International Federation of Karnataka Christian Associations (IFKCA) is an organization that represents Christian associations in the Indian state of Karnataka. It is active in addressing the concerns of the Christian minority in the state, which has been subject to repeated attacks by extremists.

== Foundation ==
The IFKCA founder and President is the Non-Resident Indian entrepreneur Ronald Colaco. (Note: Colaco has been involved in other philanthropical activities. In April 2012 it was reported that he had spent 27 million rupees to build the Holy Rosary Church for the 1,200 Catholics from Venkatala-Yelahanka, with a seating capacity of over 100. Colaco also helped rebuild the ancient Hoysala Hindu temple in Chikkajala. Colaco had also donated to Mosques.) Colaco opened the IFKCA office at Link Campus, Bajal, Mangalore, on 21 April 2013. At the ceremony the Reverent Fr Cyril Pinto, Parish Priest of Holy Spirit Church, Bajal, blessed the premises. Colaco called on members of the Christian community to unite. He said, "The names of the people from the community are not included in the voters' list because political parties think their votes do not matter. Every political party will bother about us when we become an influencing or deciding factor." He also said that fundamentalists would hesitate to attack Christians if they were united.

== Activities ==
The IFKCA works with other organizations such as the Karnataka Missions Network Mangalore, which represents about 100 Protestant churches and organizations, Karnataka United Christian Forum for human rights, Mangalore Christian Council and the All India Christian Council (AICC). In June 2010 the IFKCA joined with Mangalore Catholic Mahila Sanghatane, Catholic Sabha, Krishi Bhumi Samrakshana Samiti and Bharathiya Catholic Yuva Sanghatane in staging a protest in solidarity with the farmer Gregory Patrao. Patrao claimed that Mangalore Special Economic Zone Limited (MSEZ) had taken his land, which they now denied, and demolished his house. The demolition had been videotaped. Patrao's family belongings, farm equipment and produce had been seized. Louis Lobo of the IFKCA said, "The authorities on the first place did not give Gregory an opportunity to use his right to move to the court. Now after Gregory’s movement gained momentum and support, the officials are asking him to come and collect his belongings. The authorities should come and hand it over to Gregory."

On 1 July 2011 Ronald Colaco, president of the IFKCA, met with RSS leader Dr Kalladka Prabhakar Bhat, with the goal of strengthening relations between the Christian and Hindu communities and bringing communal harmony. Colaco presented a flower bouquet to Bhat, who praised Colaco for his effort in gaining government funding for the Christian Development Board. Colaco denied that Christians had been unlawfully engaged in conversions.

In August 2011 Colaco led a delegation of Christian leaders to congratulate Chief Minister D. V. Sadananda Gowda on his election and to present IFKCA demands for actions to improve communal harmony and to withdraw the charges laid against Christian youth after the 2008 attacks on Christians in southern Karnataka. The Chief Minister promised to ensure the cases were withdrawn, and to constitute the Christian Development Board. He expressed concern that the BJP was repeatedly blamed for the church attacks, in which the party had no involvement. In December 2011 Colaco thanked the Sadananda Gowda for withdrawing the charges against the Christian youths. In June 2012 the Holy Hill Catholic church in Mangalore was attacked and damaged by an unidentified group. Janardhana Poojary of the Congress Party blamed the Sangh Parivar for the incident. Dr Aloysius Paul D'Souza, Bishop of Mangalore, again called for action by the authorities. The IFKCA was among Christian organizations that condemned the attack.

In March 2014 a group of Christian leaders from the IFKCA and the Federation of Konkani Catholic Associations (FKCA) protested against the decision by the Congress Party to not field any Christian candidates in the forthcoming elections for the 28 Lok Sabha constituencies in Karnataka. The leaders were headed by Charles Amber and including IFKCA secretary Michael Baptist. They said that almost 4% of the 62 million people in Karnataka were Christian, with large populations in Mangalore, Udupi-Chikmagalur, Karwar, Shimoga, Dharwad, Belgaum, Mysore and Bangalore. They claimed the Congress government was "deliberately sidelining Christians from the top posts in the Government". They also said that the Christian Development Council, which the previous Bharatiya Janata Party government had set up, was "not being taken forward now". They said they would mark ballots NOTA (None Of The Above) in protest.

In October 2014 Ronald Colaco led a delegation of Christian leaders that met Siddaramaiah, Chief Minister of Karnataka, and thanked him on behalf of the Christian community for rejecting the report by the Somshekar Inquiry Commission concerning the 2008 attacks on Churches, and for directing a fresh inquiry.

== Sources ==
- AsiaNews, CBCI (5 April 2012). "Bangalore, a Catholic entrepreneur gifts new Church to Archdiocese". Asia News.
- Bantwal, Rons (25 August 2011). "Chief Minister promises Christian Development Board and withdrawal of cases against attack on Christians". kemmannu.com. Kemmannu News Network.
- Bantwal, Rons (2 July 2011). "RSS and Christian federation leaders discuss over Communal Harmony in Karnataka". Daijiworld Media Network.
- Bellevision Media Network (19 October 2014). "Bangalore: Christian leaders hail CM's decision to hold fresh inquiry into Church attack". Bellevision.
- "'Christian community should unite'". The Hindu. 22 April 2013. Archived from the original on 31 August 2014.
- Daijiworld Media Network (22 April 2013). "Ronald Colaco inaugurates Mangalore office of IFKCA". daijiworld.com. Daijiworld Media.
- DH News Service (29 June 2010). "Gregory Patrao's stir grows stronger day by day". Deccan Herald.
- John, KK (27 June 2012). "Attack on Mangalore church condemned". Christian Today.
- Mangalore Today News Network (19 October 2014). "Mangalore Christian group welcomes Govt moves on Somashekara Report". Mangalore Today.
- Our Mission, Karnataka Missions Network Mangalore, archived from the original on 18 January 2015
- Shenoy, Jaideep (4 December 2011). "International Federation of Karnataka Christian Associations (IFKCA) has welcomed move..." Times of India.
- Vasuki, Kestur (27 March 2014). "IGNORED BY CONGRESS, K'TAKA CHRISTIANS MAY OPT FOR NOTA". Daily Pioneer. Bangalore.
