= Adoration Monastery of the Sisters of St-Clare =

Coordinates: 12.8721°N 74.8434°E

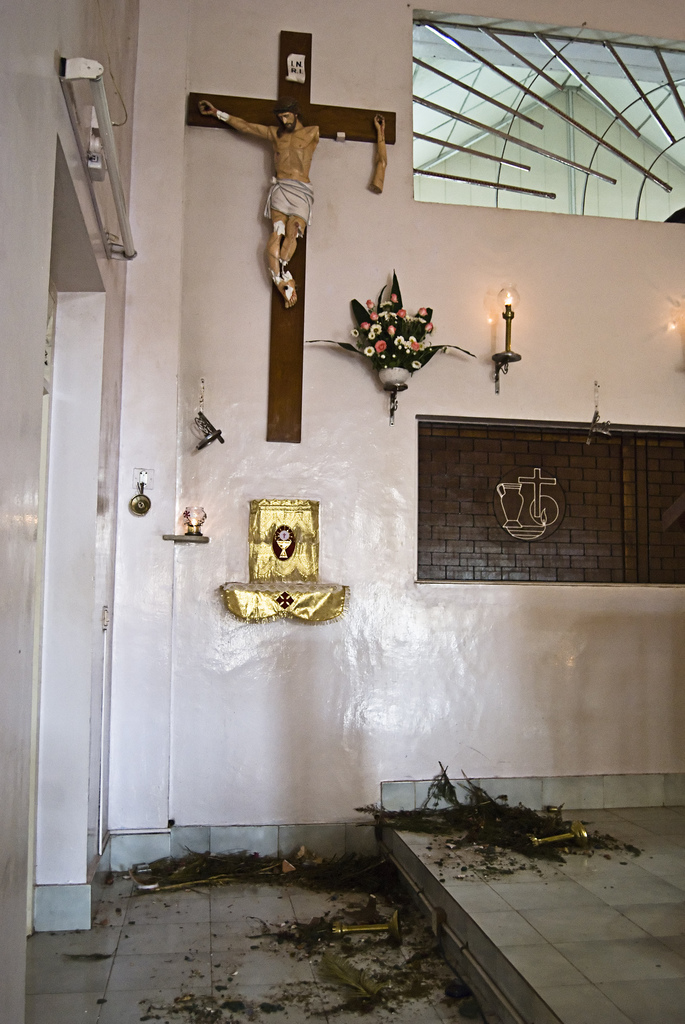
Destroyed property inside Adoration Monastery, Mangalore, after it was vandalised by anti-Christian activists

Adoration Monastery of the Sisters of St-Clare is a Christian monastery in Hampankatta, Mangalore, Karnataka, India, near Milagres Church. On 14 Sept 2008, the 2008 attacks on Christians in southern Karnataka broke out here, quickly followed by some 13 others within one hour. The attacks began when a group of some 15 youths on motorbikes from the suspected Hindu organisation of Bajrang Dal arrived at the chapel at around 10:15 AM, IST, shouting a pro-Bajrang Dal slogan. They entered the monastery and attacked it with lathis, desecrating the tabernacle and the Eucharist, the monstrance, a crucifix, the oil lamps, the vases on the altar and a few statues of saints. A couple praying in the church at the time were also reportedly beaten by the intruders. Two nuns were also reportedly injured.

The local congregation rushed to the scene of the attacks as peaceful protesters at first. Violence broke out at the monastery as the police began suppressing those who were protesting, they did so with baton charges and teargas shells to disperse the crowd, in self defence the protesters pelted stones at the police and their vans. The police were reported to have caused further damage to the Adoration monastery by throwing back stones and glass bottles to restrain the protestors. Union Minister of Labour and Employment Oscar Fernandes and MLA Ramanat Rai arrived at the scene at 6 pm. Over 25 Christians were arrested by the police during the event, as were five young members of the Hindu fundamentalist group Bajrang Dal. Four policemen and journalist Anil Jogi were reportedly injured in the incident, and three police vehicles damaged. Several of the injured were taken to Muller Medical College Hospital and Wenlock District Hospital.
