= Yedapadavu =

Coordinates: 12°59′58″N 74°58′32″E

Yedapadavu is a former village (township) in Mangalore taluk, Karnataka, India, that was divided into Badagayedapadavu (North Yedapadavu) and Tenkayedapadavu (South Yedapadavu). Yedapadavu now gives its name, as "Yedapadav" to the gram panchayat for those two villages. The village of Tenkayedapadavu is the main village for the gram panchayat, and is sometimes called "Yedapadavu". Yedapadavu was affected by the 2008 attacks on Christians in southern Karnataka. The gram panchayat is about 21 km northeast of the city of Mangalore, connected via NH 169 (formerly NH 13).bh
