= Basil Salvadore D'Souza =

Indian Roman Catholic Bishop

- Bishop of Mangalore
- Church: Roman Catholic Church
- See: Mangalore Diocese
- In office: 1965–1996
- Predecessor: Raymond D'Mello
- Successor: Aloysius Paul D'Souza

Orders
- Ordination: 11 May 1965
- Consecration: by James Robert Knox, Albert Vincent D'Souza, and Alphonsus Mathias

Personal details
- Born: 23 May 1926 Mangalore, British India
- Died: 5 September 1996 (aged 70) Mangalore, Karnataka, India

Basil Salvadore D'Souza (23 May 1926 – 5 September 1996) was the Bishop of the Roman Catholic Diocese of Mangalore from 22 March 1965 until his death on 5 September 1996. He was the longest-serving bishop in the diocese's history.

== Early life ==
Basil Salvadore D'Souza was born on 23 May 1926 in St. Lawrence parish, at Bondel, Mangalore. He was the eldest of seven children to a Mangalorean Catholic couple, Diego and Maria D'Souza (née Pereira). The family belonged to the D'Souza-Kamath clan, a Mangalorean Catholic clan of the same area. Economically, the family was poor and subsisted on income generated by cultivating betel leaves. D'Souza was ordained into the priesthood on 25 March 1952. He later became the manager of the Catholic Board of Education, and also served at the Kodialbail Press.

== Bishop of Mangalore ==
D'Souza was appointed Bishop of Mangalore on 22 March 1965, and consecrated on 11 May 1965 by Abp James Robert Knox, papal nuncio in India. He retained the post until his death, thereby becoming the longest-serving bishop of the diocese. D'Souza was among the few participants in the final sessions of the Second Vatican Council in 1965. He spearheaded the implementation of the renewal then proclaimed by the council, and became the first Indian bishop to implement what was envisaged in the documents of the Second Vatican Council. He was responsible for the introduction of vernacular services instead of Latin in his diocese. The Bible and other liturgical texts were translated into Konkani during his tenure. He organised the welcome for Pope John Paul II during his visit to Mangalore on 6 February 1986.

D'Souza's long tenure saw the establishment of several new parishes (mainly in the remote villages) and institutions such as family guidance centres. He founded a new mission outside the Mangalore Diocese at Bidar in northern Karnataka, where the number of Christians was small. He adopted the place as a missionary territory, and it later became a part of the Roman Catholic Diocese of Gulbarga. D'Souza served as Chairman of the CBCI Commission of Vocations, in which capacity he founded the National Vocation Centre at Poona. He also founded the Chair of Christianity at Mangalore University in 1987.

== Death ==
D'Souza died of heart attack on 5 September 1996. During his time of death, D'Souza was just five years away from retirement His remains were interred at the Rosario Cathedral on 9 September 1996. On 8 November, he was succeeded as Bishop of Mangalore Diocese by Aloysius Paul D'Souza.
