= Augustus Müller =

Augustus Müller, born 13 March 1841 in Westphalia (Germany) and died on 1 November 1910 at Kankanady-Mangalore (India), was a German Jesuit priest, missionary in India. Giving himself to the care of the sick he popularized homeopathic medicine in Mangalore. He died because of complications caused by asthma at the age of 69. The Father Muller Charitable Institutions, established in 1880, have been named after him.

== History ==
Fr. Muller was the grandson of Augustine Muller, a teacher of Samuel Hahnemann, the founder of homeopathy. He studied in Fordham University (United States), and trained with eminent doctors in Paris. He was sent to Mangalore from Venice, along with eight other Jesuits, to teach French and mathematics at the St. Aloysius' College.

A trained homeopath, he began treating students under a banyan tree in the college campus. As his reputation grew, so did the number of patients. In order to accommodate them, he purchased land in Kankanady and started the Homoeopathic Poor Dispensary. He was recognized for his contribution to society by the British Raj with the Kaisar-i-Hind award.

He started treating lepers in 1883, and founded the St. Joseph's Leprosy Hospital at Kankanady.

== Death Centenary (1910–2010) ==
The Father Muller Charitable Institutions (FMCI) observed the death centenary of Fr. Muller on 1 November 2010. The chief guest of the function was the Police Commissioner of Mangalore City, Seemanth Kumar Singh, of the Indian Police Service. The ceremony was presided over by the Bishop of Mangalore and chairman of the FMCI, Rev. Dr. Aloysius Paul D'Souza, who also laid the foundation stone for the new building for the Father Muller College Of Nursing. The Father Muller Museum was also inaugurated as a part of the Centenary celebrations.
