= Jayapura (disambiguation) =

Jayapura is a city in the Indonesian province of Papua.

Jayapura may also refer to:

- Jayapura Regency, a regency in the Indonesian province of Papua
- Jayapura, Chickmagalur, India
- Jayapura, Mysore, India
- Jaipur (Hindi: Jayapura), the capital of Rajasthan state, India
- Jeyyapura, a classical name of Sagaing, Myanmar

== Other ==
- Jaipur (disambiguation)
