= Mahendra Kumar =

Indian political activist (died 2020)

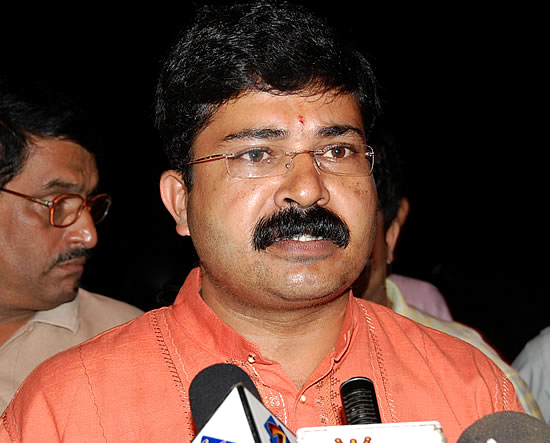
Mahendra Kumar

Mahendra Kumar (died 25 April 2020) was the convener of the Karnataka, India, branch of the Bajrang Dal, an Indian Hindutva militant organisation. He was reportedly involved in the 2008 attacks on Christians in southern Karnataka on 14 September 2008. He claimed that he was incarcerated for 42 days in Mangalore before being released on conditional bail by Karnataka High Court Justice Ashok B. Hinchigeri on 25 October 2008, and was used as a scapegoat by the Bharatiya Janata Party regime to "save the government from further embarrassment after the church attacks and on instructions from the Sangh Parivar leaders."

He denied that any Catholic churches were attacked by his group during the attacks but reportedly accepted responsibility for the attacks on prayer halls belonging to the New Life Fellowship Trust. The Bajrang Dal were reported to have stated that they were not against Christianity in the region but were offended by the alleged forcible conversions. Kumar had initially denied any involvement in the attacks before being arrested. When asked again at a later date though if he had accepted responsibility for the attacks he denied it.

Kumar resigned from Bajrang Dal on 1 October 2008 after witnessing a Hindu woman who had decided to commit suicide with her three children but was saved by Christian missionaries. He stated "That was the time I realised that life is more important than dharma (religion). A lot needs to be done for the betterment of life. My dream is to build a society that values life more than religion. In jail I read several literary works. I joined Bajrang Dal so that we could mobilise the youth for a good cause, but at the end of the day all our concepts were politically motivated." In February 2011, after the commission reports into the attacks were published, Kumar formally apologised to the public for the attacks and accused the BJP Government of corruption. On 21 February 2011 he joined the Janata Dal Party (JDS), declaring, "I am today shedding the shackles of communalism to strive for communal harmony, for which the JDS is working." He was succeeded as state convener of the Bajrang Dal by Suryanarayana. Kumar died in Bengaluru of a heart attack on 25 April 2020.
