= Father Muller Charitable Institutions =

- Founder: Augustus Muller
- Established: 1880
- President: Most. Rev. Dr. Peter Paul Saldanha
- Address: Father Muller Road, Kankanady, Mangalore - 575 002,
- Location: Mangalore, Karnataka, India
- Website: http://fathermuller.edu.in/

Father Muller Charitable Institutions (FMCI) is an organisation established in 1880 which regulates the religious minority educational and medical institutions founded by Father Augustus Muller. The FMCI is run by the Roman Catholic Diocese of Mangalore.

Its president is the Bishop of Mangalore, Most. Rev. Dr. Peter Paul Saldanha.

== History ==
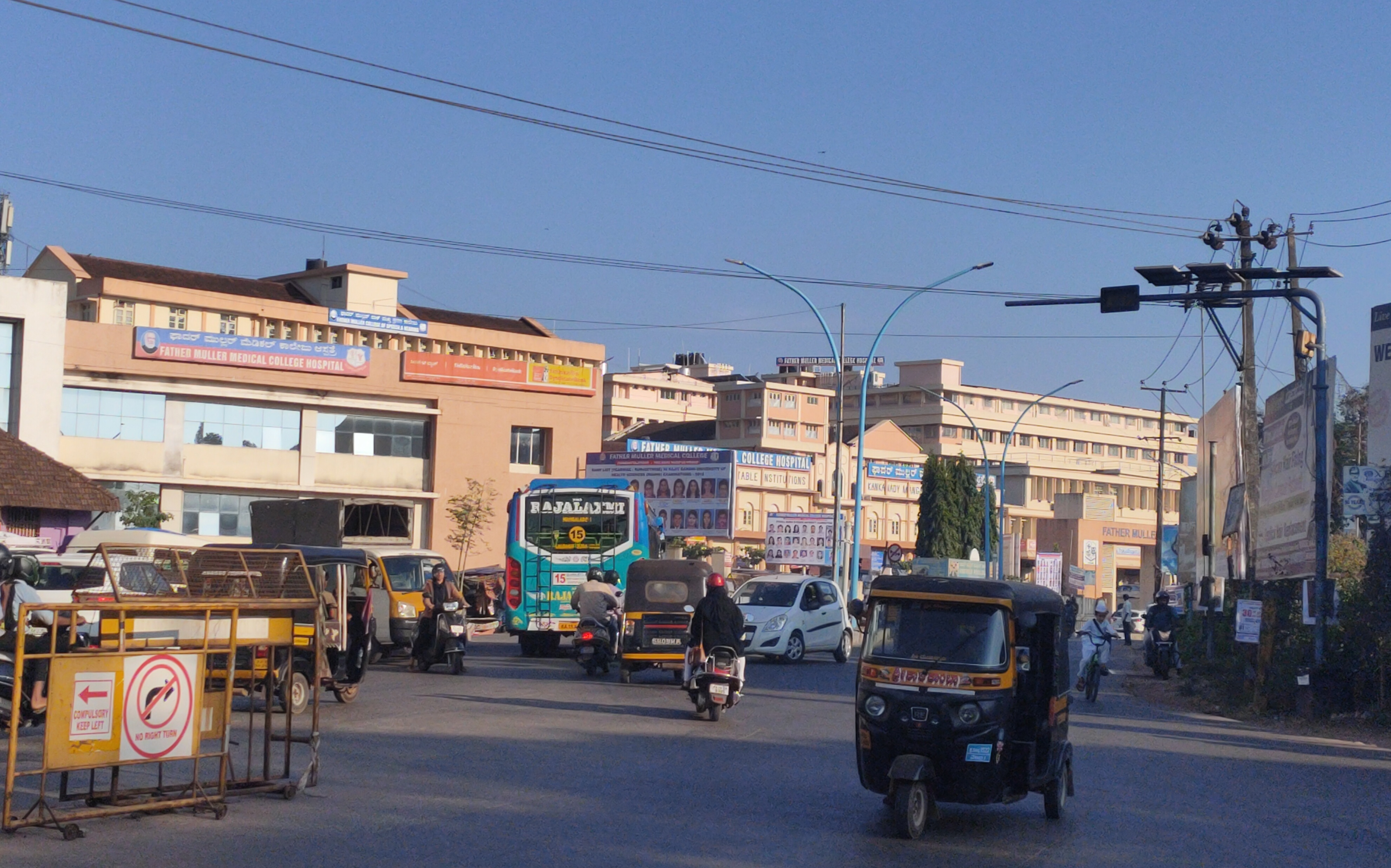
Fr Muller Hospital

Fr. Augustus Muller S. J. was a German Jesuit priest who popularized homeopathic medicine in Mangalore. He was sent to Mangalore from Venice, along with eight other Jesuits, to teach French and mathematics at the St. Aloysius College. A trained homeopath, he began treating students under a banyan tree in the college campus. As his reputation grew, so did the number of patients. In order to accommodate them, he purchased land in Kankanady and started the Homoeopathic Poor Dispensary. He was recognized for his contribution to society by the British Raj with the Kaisar-i-Hind award. He started treating lepers in 1883, and founded the St. Joseph Leprosy Hospital at Kankanady in 1890.

He died on 1 November 1910 due to complications caused by asthma at the age of 69.

== FMCI Hospitals ==
- Father Muller Medical College Hospital
- Father Muller Homeopathic Medical College Hospital
- Father Muller Homeopathic Pharmaceutical Division (HPD)
- St Joseph Leprosy Hospital
- Father Muller Rehabilitation Unit
- Father Muller Hospital

== FMCI Educational Institutions ==
- Father Muller Medical College
- Father Muller Homeopathic Medical College
- Father Muller College
- Father Muller College of Allied Health Sciences
- Father Muller College of Nursing
- Father Muller School of Nursing
- Father Muller College of Pharmaceutical Sciences
- Father Muller College of Physiotherapy
- Father Muller Nursing College Thumbay

== Death centenary celebrations of Fr. Muller (1910–2010) ==
The Father Muller Charitable Institutions (FMCI) celebrated the death centenary of Fr. Muller on 1 November 2010. The chief guest of the function was the police commissioner of Mangalore City, Seemanth Kumar Singh, of the Indian Police Service. The ceremony was presided over by the Bishop of Mangalore and chairman of the FMCI, Rev. Dr. Aloysius Paul D'Souza, who laid the foundation stone for the new building for the Father Muller College of Nursing.

The Father Muller Museum was inaugurated as a part of the centenary celebrations.

== Notable alumni ==
Edmond Fernandes, Founder - CHD Group & Director, Edward & Cynthia Institute of Public Health, Mangalore, India.
