= Suryanarayana (Bajrang Dal) =

Suryanarayana was the state convener of the Karnataka branch of the Bajrang Dal, an Indian militant Hindutva organisation. He is the successor to Mahendra Kumar, Bajrang dal was blamed for involvement in the 2008 attacks on Christians in southern Karnataka in September 2008 post which Suryanarayana undergone.
