= Vartakara Sangha =

Vartakara Sangha is a Muslim merchant's association in the state of Karnataka, India. They have helped merchants forced to move from markets and shops where they do business, and have participated in rallies protesting communal violence against minorities.

== Merchants' advocacy ==
In 2003 Vartakara Sangha had an auditorium in Ranebennuru, Karnataka, which was used by the Lions Clubs International. In September 2013 G.M. Chikkamath, president of the Vartakara Sangha (Merchants’ Association) of Akki Honda in Hubli, Karnataka, asked that they be allowed to sell rice and pulses from both the Akki Honda and Amargol yards in Hubli. The merchants had agreed to move from Akki Honda to Amargol based on assurances from the administration that roads, electricity, drinking water and telecom lines would be in place there, but none of this had been done. 92 merchants were affected. In November 2015 Vartakara Sangha, Padubidri, and Rashtriya Heddari Sambhavya Santrastara Samiti filed a petition that challenged the decision to widen National Highway 66 where it runs through Padubidri, Udupi, Karnataka, since this would involve demolishing 96 buildings.

== Civil rights ==
In February 2011 Muslim Vartakara Sangha of Mangalore, Karnataka participated in a large silent march led by Aloysius Paul D'Souza, Bishop of Mangalore, in protest against the Somshekar Report. In January 2012 Muslim Vartakara Sangha was one of the participating organizations in a rally to protest against the increasing number of communal attacks in Karnataka, and to demand implementation of the Communal Violence Prevention, Control and Rehabilitation Bill.
