= Ernody =

Ernody is a village in Dakshina Kannada district, Karnataka, India. It contains the St. George church. On 16 September 2008 the church was desecrated and attempted to be burned by miscreants during the 2008 attacks on Christians in southern Karnataka.
