= Jaipur (disambiguation) =

Jaipur is the capital of Rajasthan state, India.

Jaipur, Jaypur, Jeypore, or Joypur may also refer to:

== Places in India ==
=== West Bengal ===
- Joypur, Bankura (community development block)
- Joypur, Bankura, a village in the Joypur block
- Joypur, Purulia, a community development block
- Jaypur, Purulia, a town in the Joypur block

=== Other places in India ===
- Jaipur, Buldhana, Maharashtra
- Jaipur, Hingoli, Maharashtra
- Jaipur, Mancherial district, Telangana
- Jaipur district, a district of the state of Rajasthan
- Jaipur division, an administrative unit of Rajasthan state
- Jaipur State, the Jaipur princely state
- Jeypore, the largest town in the Koraput district of Orissa
- Joypur, Assam, a town in Dibrugarh district

== Constituencies ==
- Jaipur Lok Sabha constituency, a Lok Sabha parliamentary constituency of Rajasthan
- Joypur, Purulia Assembly constituency in Purulia district, West Bengal, India

== Other ==
- Jaipur (card game)
- Jaipur (horse)
- Jaipur Airport, India

== See also ==
- Jayapura (disambiguation)
