= Bishop of Glendalough =

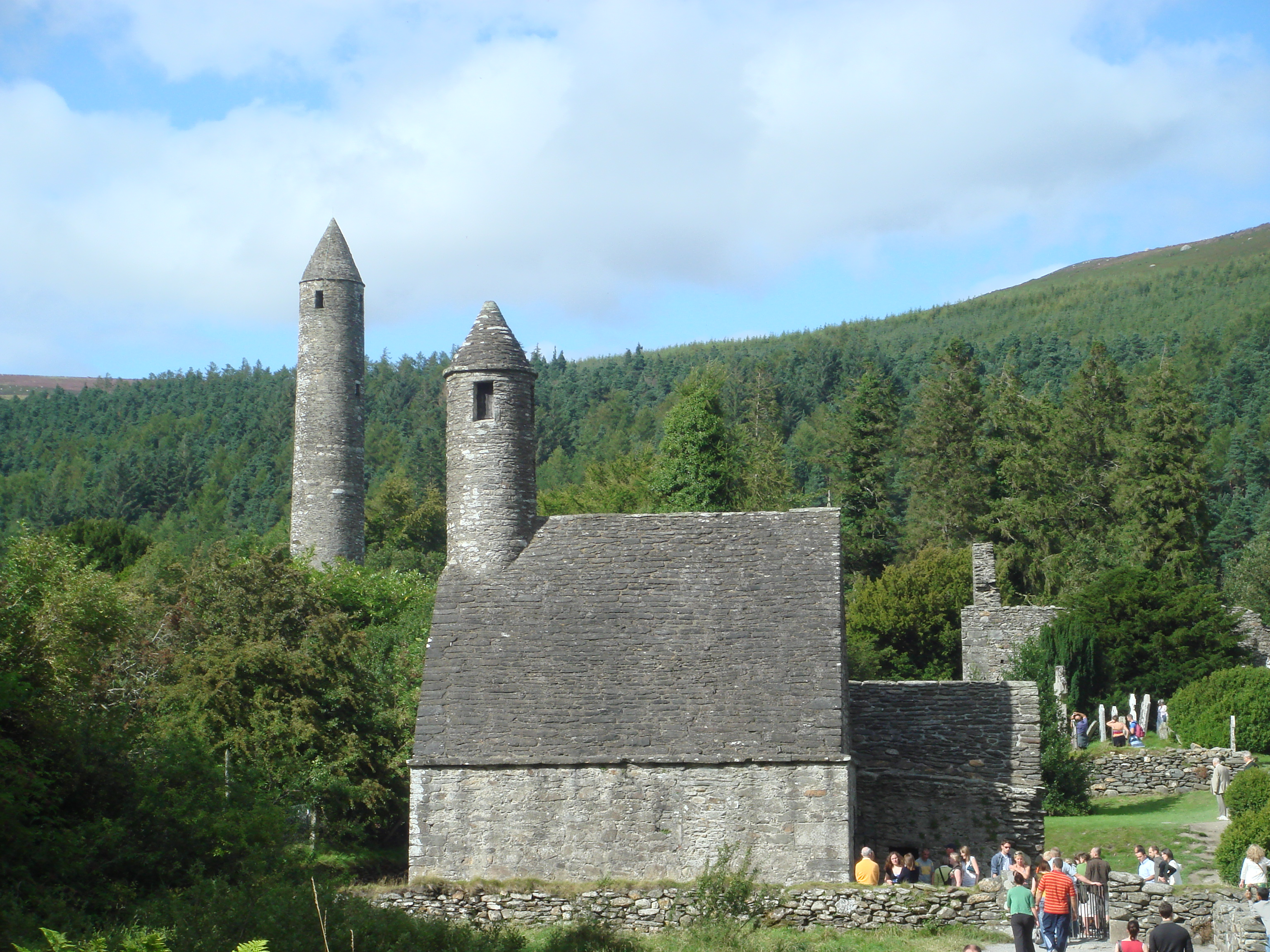
The monastery at Glendalough

The Bishop of Glendalough (Irish: Easpuig Gleann Dá Loch) is an episcopal title in the Church of Ireland, which takes its name after the monastery at Glendalough in County Wicklow, Ireland. An Irish version of the place name, Glenndálocha, is now used for a titular see in the Roman Catholic Church.

== History ==
The diocese of Glendalough was one of the dioceses established at the Synod of Rathbreasail, held in 1111. After the death of Bishop William Piro and the failed effort to get possession of the see by Bishop-elect Robert de Bedford, the dioceses of Glendalough and Dublin were united in 1214. The union of the two was confirmed by Pope Innocent III on 25 February 1216, and confirmed again by Pope Honorius III on 6 October 1216. During the late fifteenth and early sixteenth centuries, a number of titular bishops were appointed, but none of them had effective possession of the see. After the Reformation in Ireland, the title Bishop of Glendalough was dropped by the Roman Catholic archbishops of Dublin, but is still used by the Church of Ireland archbishops of Dublin.

In 1969, an Irish version of the place name, Glenndálocha, is now used by Roman Catholic Church for a titular see which is currently vacant.

== Diocesan bishops of Glendalough ==
Bishops of Glendalough
| From | Until | Incumbent | Notes |
|---|---|---|---|
| unknown | 1126 | Áed Ua Modáin | Died in office |
| bef.1140 | unknown | (name not known) | Became bishop before 1140; death date unknown |
| bef.1152 | c.1157 | Gilla na Náem | Became bishop before the Synod of Kells in March 1152; resigned circa 1157; died 7 April 1160/61 |
| c.1157 | 1173 | Cináed Ua Rónáin | Became bishop circa 1157; died in office; also known as Celestinus and Clemens |
| bef.1176 | 1186 | Máel Callann Ua Cléirchén | Became bishop before 1176; died in office; also known as Malchus |
| unknown | c.1192 | Macrobius | Died in office |
| 1192 | 1212 | William Piro | Became bishop in 1192; died in office before 30 July 1212 |
| 1213/14 | | (Robert de Bedford) | Elected bishop in 1213 or 1214, but failed to gain possession of the see; later elected Bishop of Lismore in 1218 |

== Medieval titular bishops of Glendalough ==
Titular Bishops of Glendalough
| From | Until | Incumbent | Notes |
|---|---|---|---|
| unknown | 1481 | Michael | Died before 22 October 1481 |
| 1481 | 1497 | Denis White, O.P. | Appointed 22 October 1481, but did not get possession; resigned 30 May 1497 |
| unknown | 1494 | John | Died before 10 November 1494 |
| 1494 | 1495 | Ivo Ruffi, O.F.M. | Appointed 10 November 1494; died before 21 August 1495 |
| 1500 | unknown | Francis FitzJohn of Corduba, O.F.M. | Appointed 21 August 1500; death date unknown |

== Modern titular bishops and archbishops of Glenndálocha ==
Titular Bishops and Archbishops of Glenndálocha
| From | Until | Incumbent | Notes |
|---|---|---|---|
| 1969 | 1971 | Raymond D'Mello | Formerly Bishop of Mangalore, India (1959–1964) and Bishop of Allahabad, India (1964–1969); appointed Titular Bishop of Glenndálocha 20 December 1969; died 24 November 1971 |
| 1973 | 1981 | Marian Przykucki | Appointed Auxiliary Bishop of Poznań and Titular Bishop of Glenndálocha 12 December 1973; ordained bishop 3 February 1974; appointed Bishop of Culm (Chełmno) 15 June 1981 |
| 1982 | 1996 | Donal Brendan Murray | Appointed Auxiliary Bishop of Dublin and Titular Bishop of Glenndálocha 4 March 1982; ordained bishop 18 April 1982; appointed Bishop of Limerick 10 February 1996 |
| 1998 | 2003 | Diarmuid Martin | Appointed Titular Bishop of Glenndálocha 5 December 1998; ordained bishop 6 January 1999; elevated Titular Archbishop of Glenndálocha 17 January 2001; appointed Coadjutor Archbishop of Dublin 3 May 2003 and succeeded Archbishop of Dublin 26 April 2004 |
| 2006 | 2021 | Guy A. Sansaricq | Appointed Auxiliary Bishop of Brooklyn and Titular Bishop of Glenndálocha 6 June 2006; ordained bishop 22 August 2006; died 21 August 2021 |
