= Sardar Patel University of Police, Security and Criminal Justice =

- Motto: Knowledge is Power
- Type: Public
- Established: 2012 (14 years ago)
- Affiliations: UGC
- Chancellor: Governor of Rajasthan
- Vice-Chancellor: Alok Tripathi
- Location: Jodhpur, Rajasthan, India
- Website: www.policeuniversity.ac.in

Sardar Patel University of Police, Security and Criminal Justice (or sometimes simply called Police University) is an Indian state university located at Jodhpur, Rajasthan.

== History ==
The Sardar Patel University of Police, Security and Criminal Justice was established in 2012 by the Government of Rajasthan through Sardar Patel University of Police, Security and Criminal Justice, Jodhpur Act, 2012, named after Vallabhbhai Patel, the first Deputy Prime Minister of India.

In 2015, the Sardar Patel University of Police introduced the LL.M./M.A. in criminal law, and co-organized the first counter-terrorism conference in the country. In 2016, it opened a new class to study national, international and transnational criminal law.

=== Governance ===
M. L. Kumawat was the first Vice Chancellor (VC) of the university and served until 2015. Bhupendra Singh served as officer on special duty (OSD) for the universality since 2012, before being appointed Pro Vice Chancellor in 2013. He then served as VC of the university in additional charge following Kumawat. In 2018 N.R.K. Reddy was appointed Pro Vice Chancellor and also served as VC in additional charge. Alok Tripathi was appointed as second VC of the university in October 2020.

== Academics ==
The Sardar Patel University of Police, Security and Criminal Justice focuses on teaching and research in the fields of police science, social sciences, criminal law, criminology, public safety, national security and related areas.

=== Faculties ===
- Faculty of Criminal Justice and Police Studies
- Faculty of Social Science And Humanities
- Faculty Of Public Safety and National Security
- Faculty of Science, Technology & Forensics
- Faculty of Management & Behavioural Science
- Visiting Faculty
