= Kodaikal =

Locality in Mangalore city, Karnataka, India

Kodikal is a locality in Mangalore city, Karnataka, India. Its pin-code is
