= Mariyannapalya =

Neighbourhood in Bengaluru, India

- Neighbourhood
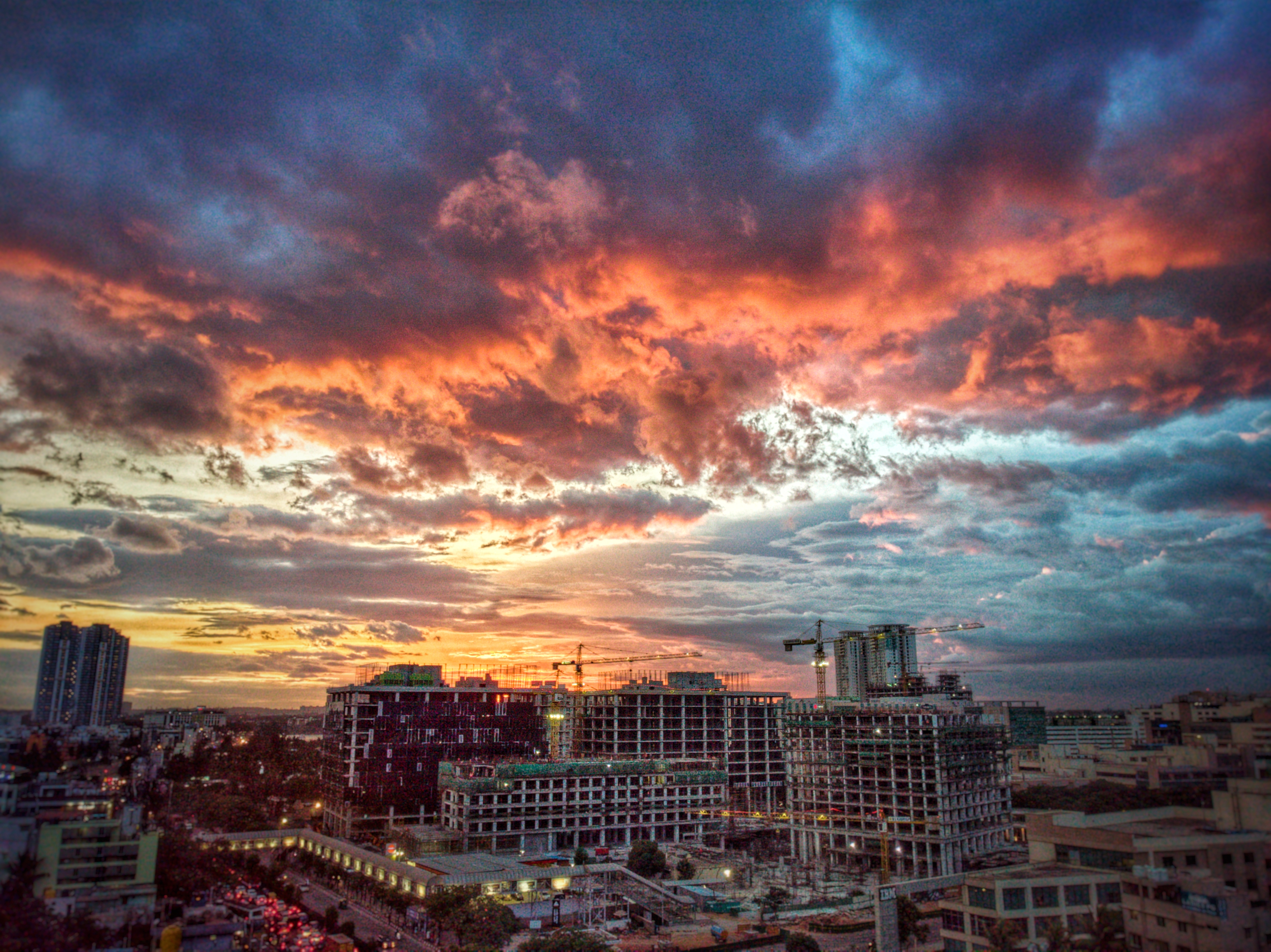
- Manyata Embassy Business Park, adjacent to Mariyannapalya

- Location within Karnataka
- Coordinates: 13.0531°N 77.6091°E
- Country: India
- State: Karnataka
- City: Bengaluru
- Ward: 9 (Amruthahalli)

Area
  - Total: 0.39 km^{2} (0.15 sq mi)
- Elevation: 874 m (2,867 ft)

Population (2011)
  - Total: 5,884
- PIN: 560024

Mariyannapalya is a neighbourhood near Hebbal in northern Bengaluru, Karnataka, India. It falls within Ward 9 (Amruthahalli) of the Bruhat Bengaluru Mahanagara Palike under the 243-ward delimitation. Neighbouring areas include Kempapura and Dasarahalli. The Manyata Embassy Business Park, a 300 acres (1.2 km^{2}) technology campus, and Nagawara Lake are nearby. Nagawara Lake covers 75.1 acres (30.4 ha) and is managed by the Karnataka Lake Conservation and Development Authority.

== Demographics ==
As of the 2011 census, Mariyannapalya had a population of 5,884 within an area of 0.39 square kilometres.

== St. James Church ==
St. James Church, Mariyannapalya, is a Roman Catholic parish church established in 1943. Masses are held in Kannada.

== Education ==
St. James Higher Primary School (UDISE code 29280707148), a government-aided school established in 1944, serves classes 1 through 7. A separate St. James High School (UDISE code 29280719836), a private-aided Kannada-medium school established in 1991, serves classes 8 through 10.
