= Gorigandi =

Village in Karnataka, India

Gorigandi is a village in Chikkamagaluru district, Karnataka, India.
