= M. F. Saldanha =

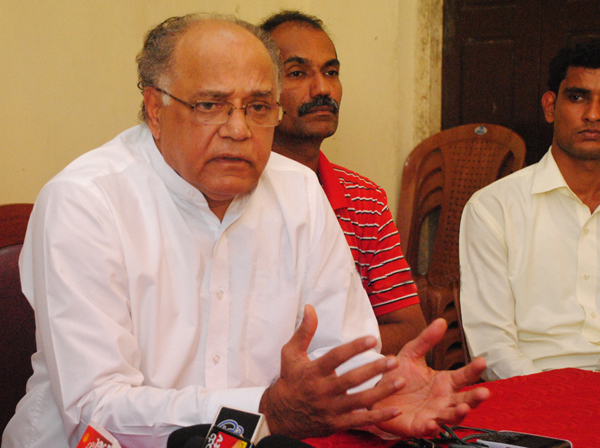
M. F. Saldanha discussing his Commission's findings at a press conference in 2011

Michael Francis Saldanha (born 13 February 1942), generally known as M. F. Saldanha, is a retired Indian judge of the Bombay High Court. Although retired from official duty, he conducted an unofficial investigation into the 2008 attacks on Christians in southern Karnataka and was outspoken against the protests and published a report in early 2011 investigating the attacks on Christian institutions and people, written up after he visited 413 locations, examined 673 witnesses and 2,114 victims of the attacks. He was strongly critical of the state government and police in his Saldanha Commission report and described the attacks as "state-sponsored terrorism" and concluded that "the attacks and incidents which took place were instigated and pre-planned. They were not only supported by the state but were also covered up for by the state." He was also critical of the official Bharatiya Janata Party government investigation and report into the attacks by B. K. Somasekhara, given that he said there was photographic and video evidence of police misconduct which the government commission had not identified.
