= Ajekar =

- Village
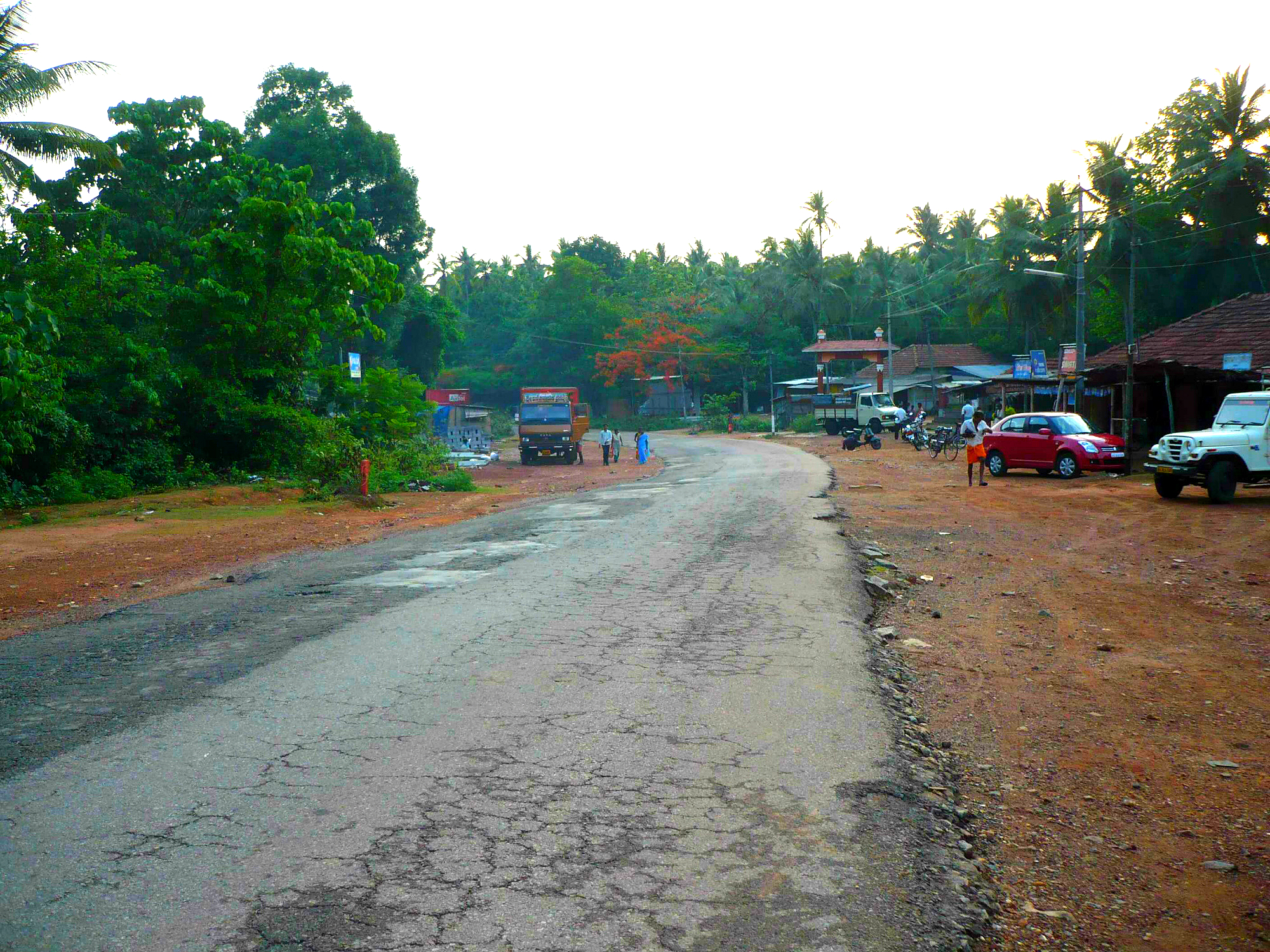
- Karnataka SH1 towards Karkala at Ajekar

- Location of Ajekar in Karnataka, India
- Coordinates: 13.3200755°N 74.99977579°E
- Country: India
- State: Karnataka
- Region: Tulunadu
- District: Udupi
- Taluka: Karkala

Government
  - Type: Gram panchayat
- Elevation: 75 m (246 ft)

Languages
  - Official: Tulu, Konkani, Kannada, Malayalam, Beary
- Time zone: UTC+5:30 (IST)
- PIN: 574101
- Telephone code: 08258

Ajekar is a small village at the foot of Valikunja in Karkala taluk of Udupi district, India. It is situated about 15 km from Karkala, 40 km from Udupi and about 65 km north-east of Mangalore.

A 14th-century Kannada inscription was found at Ganadabettu, in Ajekar under Karkala taluk, in September 2022.

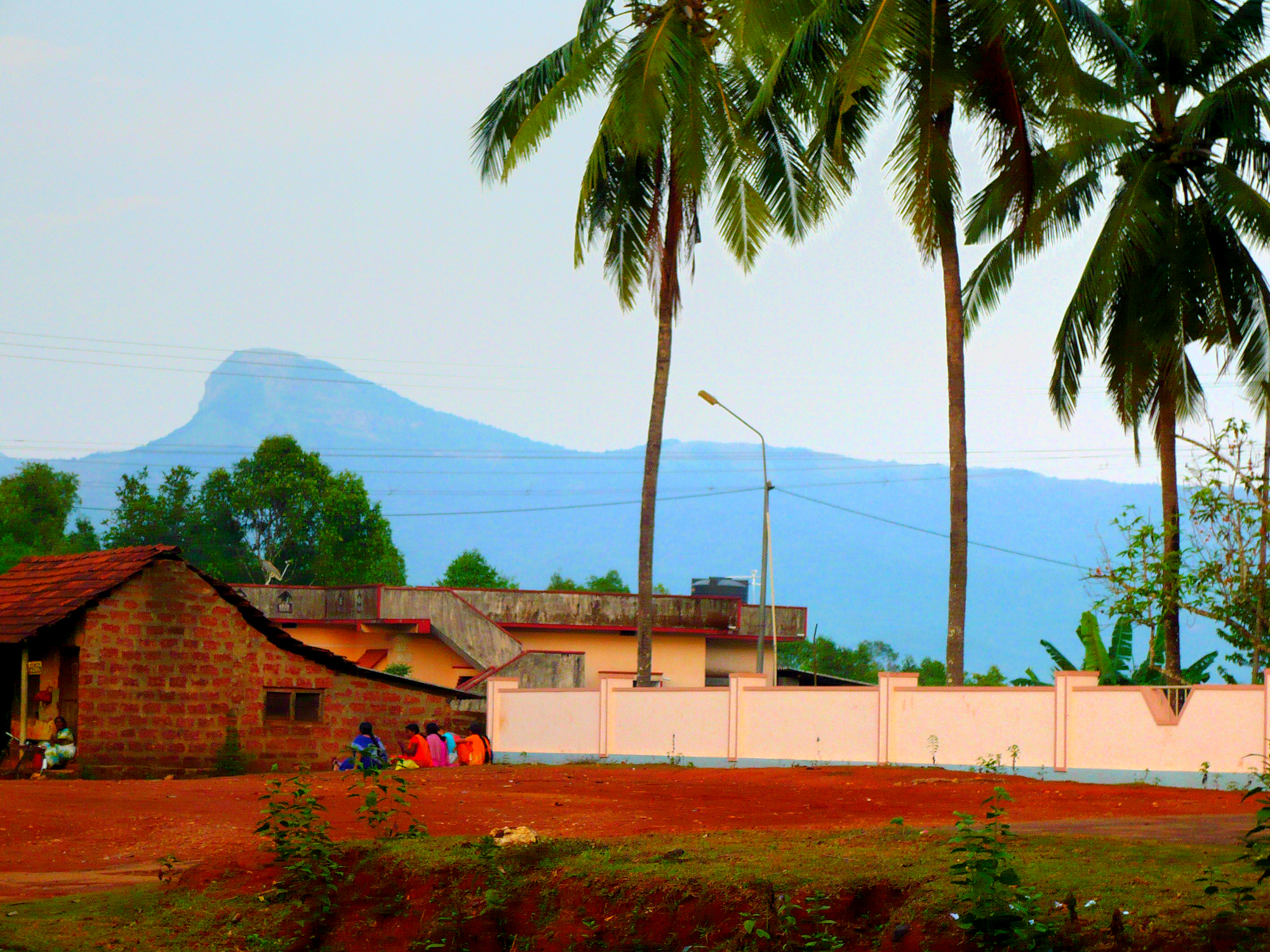
Valikunja (Ajikunja) Range from Ajekar
