= Padu Kody =

Padu Kody is a village in Mangalore taluka, Karnataka, India.
