= Sampige =

Sampige Champakapuri
- Town
- Location in Karnataka, India Sampige (India)
- Coordinates: 13°25′19″N 76°52′4″E
- Country: India
- State: Karnataka
- District: Tumkur
- Taluka: Turuvekere

Languages
  - Official: Kannada
- Time zone: UTC+5:30 (IST)
- Nearest City: Gubbi
- Climate: Cool (Köppen)

Sampige is a village and a gram panchayat in the Turuvekere taluka of the Tumkur district in Karnataka, India.

Sampige village is home to the Srinivasa Swamy Temple, which is known as "Sampige Srinivasa". Every year, the temple hosts a cart festival, which is attended by thousands of people. Several Kannada language films have been picturized at this location.

The village is named after the Kannada word for the Champak tree, and was called Champakapuri in ancient times. Sampige Srinivasa is family deity of many Hebbar Srivaishnavas.

== Villages under Sampige panchayat ==
The villages under the administration of the Sampige gram panchayat include:

- Kodipalya
- Gundi Kaval
- Yeladabagi
- Masthigondanahalli
- Veerasagara Kere Kaval
- Singasandra
- Sampige (main village)
- Veerasagara
- Joddikoppa
- Halugondanahalli
- Raghavadevanahalli
- Akkalasandra
- Tovinakere

== See also ==
- Tumkur
- Tumkur District
