= Tenkayedapadavu =

Tenkayedapadavu Yedapadavu South Yedapadavu
- village
- Location in Karnataka, India Tenkayedapadavu (India)
- Coordinates: 12°59′43″N 74°57′51″E
- Country: India
- State: Karnataka
- District: Dakshina Kannada
- Taluka: Mangalore

Government
  - Type: Panchayati raj (India)
  - Body: Gram panchayat

Population (2011)
  - Total: 6,246

Languages "TULU"
  - Official: Kannada
- Time zone: UTC+5:30 (IST)
- ISO 3166 code: IN-KA
- Vehicle registration: KA
- Website: karnataka.gov.in

Tenkayedapadavu is a panchayat village in the southern state of Karnataka, India. Administratively, it is under Mangalore taluk of Dakshina Kannada district in Karnataka. It is located at a distance of 26 km from Mangalore city. There are two villages in the gram panchayat, Tenkayedapadavu and Badagayedapadavu. The village Tenka Yedapadav is the part of Yedapadavu, divided for easier administration of village.

== Demographics ==
As of 2001 India census, Tenkayedapadavu had a population of 6,073 with 3,069 males and 3,004 females.

As of 2011 census, Tenkayedapadavu reported 6,246 inhabitants.

== See also ==
- Mangalore taluk
- Dakshina Kannada
