= Parappady =

Hamlet in Nitte village, Karnataka, India

Parappady is a hamlet in Nitte village, Karkala taluk, Udupi district, Karnataka, India.
