= Singatagere =

Singatagere is a locality in Mangalore city, Karnataka, India.
