= Shirthady =

Shirthady Siritta Adi
- town
- Shirtadi
- Country: India
- State: Karnataka
- District: Dakshina Kannada

Government
  - Type: Panchayat

Languages
  - Official: Kannada
- Time zone: UTC+5:30 (IST)
- PIN: 574236
- Vehicle registration: KA
- Nearest city: Mangalore
- Website: karnataka.gov.in

Shirthady (or Shirtadi) is a small town near Moodabidri city in Dakshina Kannada district. It is surrounded by forest.

This village has several schools like Jawaharlal Nehru High School, Mount Carmel School, Bhuvana Jyoti Residential School and also has Mount Carmel Church with a rich Christian history and other places of local importance.

It is a junction for buses towards Mantrady, Hosmar, Perady, Marody, Naravi and Moodabidri.

The distance from Shirthady to Moodabidri is 11 km and from Shirthady to Mangalore is 42 km and from Shirtady to Kudremukh is about 71 km.
