= Nellihudikeri =

Village in Karnataka, India

Nellihudikeri is a village in Kodagu district, Karnataka, India.
