= Naravi =

- village
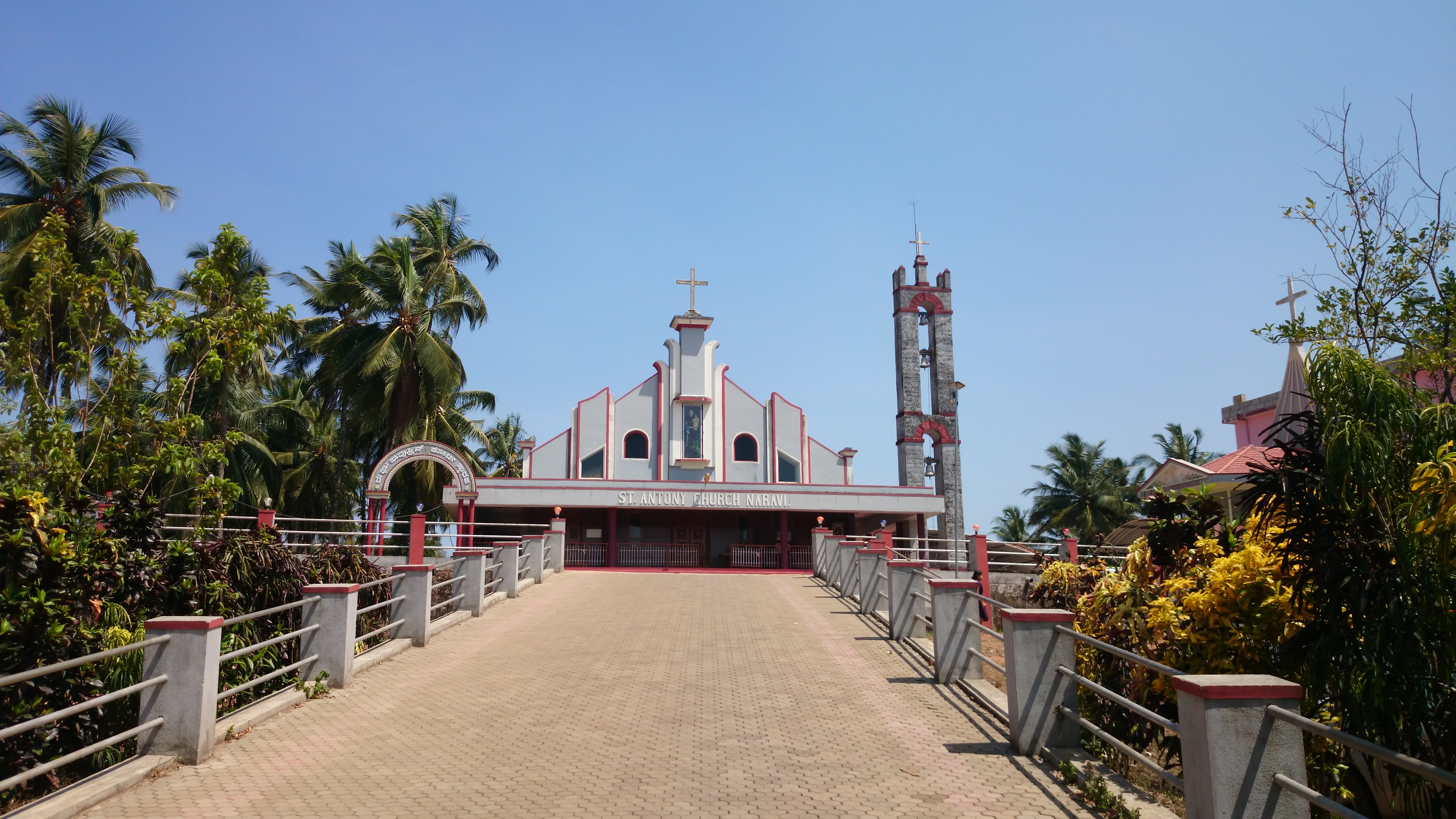
- St.Antony's Church, Naravi

- Location in Karnataka, India
- Coordinates: 12.9898°N 75.1539°E
- Country: India
- State: Karnataka
- District: Dakshina Kannada
- Taluk: Belthangady

Government
  - Body: Village Panchayat

Population (2011)
  - Total: 3,985

Languages
  - Official: Kannada
- Time zone: UTC+5:30 (IST)
- PIN: 574109
- Vehicle registration: KA 21, KA 19, KA 70
- Lok Sabha constituency: Dakshina Kannada
- Vidhana Sabha constituency: Belthangady

Naravi is a panchayat village in Belthangady taluk, Dakshina Kannada, in the foothills of the Western Ghats of India. There are two villages in the Naravi gram panchayat: Naravi and Kuthluru. It is 58 km from Mangalore and 25 km from Karkala towards Dharmasthala. Naravi is known for Sri Sooryanarayana temple, one of the two well known Sun temples, the other of which is at Konark. The village's name came from "Naa Ravi" in Kannada, which means no visible sunlight because of forest at daytime. It also has Sri Veenugopalakrishna Temple, which has a beautiful idol of Krishna carrying a child in his hands. Those who don't have children come to this statue of Krishna to pray for children.

Naravi village is also known for St. Antony Shrine, a Catholic church.

== Demographics ==
As of 2001 India census, the village of Naravi had a population of 3,900, with 1,925 males (49.4%) and 1,975 female (50.6%), for a gender ratio of 1026 females per thousand males.

In the 2011 India census, Naravi was recorded as having 3,985 inhabitants.

== Educational Organizations ==
- St. Paul's English Med. School (Near St. Antony Church, Naravi)
- St. paul's higher Primary School (Near St. Antony Church, Naravi)
- Naravi High School - Aided (Near St. Antony Church, Naravi)
- Govt. High School (Near by Bus stand, Naravi)
- St. Antony PU College (Near St. Antony Church, Naravi)
- St. Antony Degree College (Near St. Antony Church, Naravi)
