= Attur, Udupi =

Attur
- village
- Location in Karnataka, India
- Coordinates: 13.26855°N 74.9579°E
- Country: India
- State: Karnataka
- District: Udupi
- Talukas: Karkal

Languages
  - Official: Kannada
- Time zone: UTC+5:30 (IST)
- PIN: 576117
- Vehicle registration: KA-20

Attur is a small village in Karkal taluk, Udupi District, Karnataka state, India. It comes under Nitte panchayat and is a part of Mysore Division. It is located 41 kilometres (25 mi) south of the district headquarters at Udupi, 31 kilometres (19 mi) from Karkal and 349 kilometres (217 mi) from the state capital of Bangalore.

Hejamadi (13 km), Palimaru (13 km) and Padubidri (16 km) are the nearby villages to Attur. It is surrounded by Karkal and Udupi taluks to the north and Bantval taluk to the east.

Mangalore, Mudbidri, Karkala, Udupi are the nearby cities.

It is near to the Arabian Sea, which means that the weather is quite hot and humid.

== See also ==
- Udupi District
- Districts of Karnataka
