= Shamboor =

Shamboor Shamboor
- Village
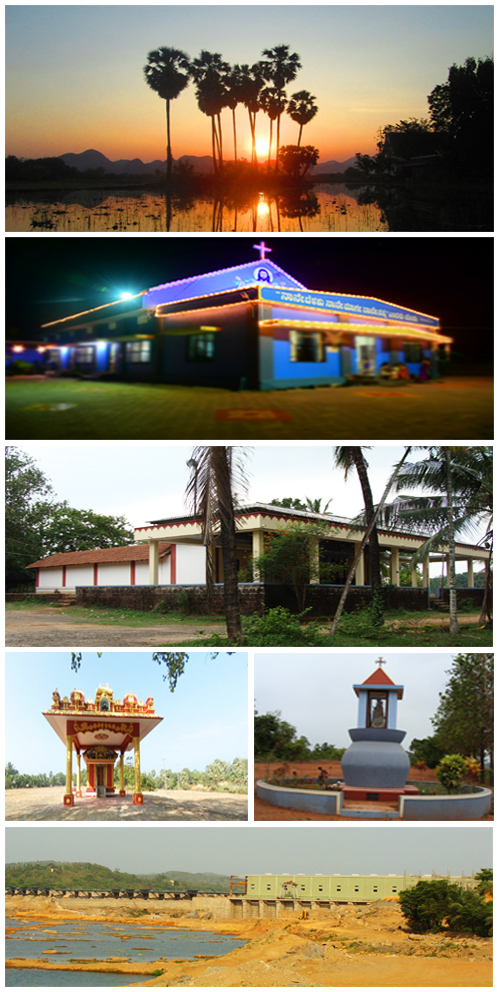
- Left to right: Palm Trees, Sacred Heart Jesus Church, Sri Shanmukha Subramanya Temple, Shri Vaidyanatha Daivastana Iranthabettu, Shamboor Church Grotto, Vented Dam Shamboor

- Location in Karnataka, India Shamboor (India)
- Coordinates: 12.8722001°N 75.0819504°E
- Country: India
- State: Karnataka
- District: Dakshina Kannada

Languages
  - Official: Kannada
  - Regional: Tulu, Konkani
- Time zone: UTC+5:30 (IST)
- PIN: 574 231
- Telephone code: 08255
- Vehicle registration: KA19, KA70

Shamboor is a village in Bantwal Taluk, Dakshina Kannada district, Karnataka, India. It is located 5 km from a small city called Panemangalore to the East.

On the side of the road heading south, on the banks of the river flowing from the north, amidst lush greenery and in a serene environment, stands the Sacred Heart of Jesus Church in Shamboor.

This church, with a history of approximately 25 years, was once part of the Borimaru Church. During the centennial year of Borimaru Church in 1993, when a request was made to the Bishop, Rev. Peter Fernandes suggested that it would be feasible to build a chapel for the two wards of the Shamboor area. With new enthusiasm, the entire community of Shamboor prepared the suitable site and plan for the chapel and submitted the request to the Bishop, accompanied by Fr. Peter Fernandes.

Considering this request, Rev. Bajil D'Souza approved it. Mr. Louis Crasta and Mr. Anthony Monis donated the land for the establishment of the chapel. Initially, a small hut-like structure was established, and masses were organized there. Gradually, in 1991, the construction of the chapel building began. The following year, a building was completed, and on February 1, 1994, the Bishop inaugurated the chapel. Subsequently, religious activities were systematically conducted here every Sunday.

Eventually, on February 6, 1996, the church building was unveiled. The people, with continued religious fervor, once again requested the appointment of a parish priest from the Bishop. The approving Bishop appointed Rev. Fr. Stany Lobo on May 23, 1998, officially declaring the chapel as a church. Since then, the devotees here, undeterred, have joined hands in developmental activities, transforming this once barren place into a beautiful site and building a better life.

== Education ==
List of schools

Higher Primary School. Shamboor

- DKZ Higher Primary School Shamboor
- Shamboor High School

Sacred Heart Of Jesus Church .Shamboor

== Religious Places ==
- Sacred Heart Of Jesus Church.

Location: This Church is situated at a distance of 37 km from Mangalore, 6 km from Panemangalore and is surrounded by Borimar, Mogarnad, Bantwal, Modankaup and Allipade parishes.

Grotto Grotto dedicated to Our Lady of Vailanakanni which in the premises of sacred heart of Jesus church

- Shri Vaidyanatha Daivastana Iranthabettu

Shri Vaidyanatha temple, Iranthabettu: A Hindu temple, with more than 1000 years of history. In recent years this temple has got a newly built Sanctuary. People from this village had put great efforts towards building this temple.

- Sri Shanmukha Subramanya Temple

Location: Situated near the river banks of Netravathi.

== Economy ==
Agriculture is the main occupation of the people around this village, people also doing farming of Areca palm & coconut Palm  Along with rubber farming.

== Transport ==
Local services buses ply from B.C road bus stand which is the main transport for the locals. Auto rickshaw service available from Panemangalore city.

== Places to See ==
- Vented Dam Shamboor
  - The dam is built up by MRPL (Mangalore Refinery and Petrochemicals Limited)
- A M R Power Project Shamboor
  - Hydel power plant
