= Makodu =

Human settlement in India

Makodu is a village in Chikkamagaluru taluk, which is about 18 kilometers from Chikkamagaluru city, Karnataka, India.
