= Holy Cross Church, Cordel =

Roman Catholic church in Mangalore, India

The Holy Cross Church is a Roman Catholic church situated at Cordel in the Kulshekar locality of Mangalore, India. It caters to nearly 6,500 people distributed in 32 Varados (Konkani: Wards). Although the church was not yet built then, the French missionary, Fr. Alexander Dubious, commonly known by the locals as "Frad Saib" served as the first parish priest of the Cordel parish from 1873, until his death on 12 December 1877. His service to the parishioners of Cordel gave him the nickname "Fraadh Saibh of Cordel".

== History ==
The cross discreetly worshipped in the Cordel forest by the Catholics who escaped the Seringapatam captivity was ceremoniously brought by Fr. Dubois to the Cordel plateau, where the Cordel Church now stands. When his vision to raise a grand church at Milagres failed to fructify, he shifted his base to Cordel. He met the expenses of this work through 30,000 Francs given to him by his family and another 30,000 francs given by his godfather—which otherwise would have been utilized for Milagres. He laid the foundation stone for the church on 14 September 1873. The church was opened in 1904.
