= Bada, Davangere =

Baada is a village in lalaaalaaaDavangere district, Karnataka, India. It is in the southern Central Karnataka.
