= Raymond D'Mello =

Raymond D'Mello was a 20th-century Roman Catholic bishop in India.

He was born in Aikala. D'Mello was Bishop of Mangalore from 1959 to 1964; and Bishop of Allahabad from 1964 to 1969. He was appointed Titular Bishop of Glenndálocha on 20 December 1969; and died on 24 November 1971.
