= M. L. Kumawat =

Mahendra Lal Kumawat
- Born: Rajasthan
- Police career
- Country: (India) Indian Police Service
- Rank: Former Director General of Border Security Force
- Batch: 1972
- Cadre: Andhra Pradesh
- Awards: President's Police Medal for Distinguished Service (1997)

Mahendra Lal Kumawat (also known as M.L. Kumawat) is a former Indian Police Service (IPS) officer of the 1972 batch of Andhra Pradesh cadre with a range of experience in the national and sub-national governments with a focus on border security, counter-terrorism and counter-Naxalism. Notably, he was the former Director General of the Border Security Force (BSF), the border patrol agency of the Government of India. He also served as the Special Secretary (Internal Security) at the Ministry of Home Affairs, Government of India.

As Special Secretary (Internal Security) at the Ministry of Home Affairs, Government of India, he was also appointed the Chairman of the Ceasefire Monitoring Group for Nagaland. In October 2012, he was appointed the Vice Chancellor of the newly created Sardar Patel University of Police, Security and Criminal Justice in Rajasthan. Previously, he was the chief of Greyhounds (police), the Anti-Naxal Commando Force of Andhra Pradesh from 1992 to 1994. He also proposed the National Police University, later approved by the Union Cabinet. He was awarded the Police Medal for Meritorious Service in 1989 and the President's Police Medal for Distinguished Service on 26 January 1997.

As a Distinguished Visitor and later Advisor to the Observer Research Foundation, he has authored various studies on security issues, most notably 'Building the resilience of India's internal security apparatus' and 'Fifty years after Naxalbari: It's time for a new narrative'.
