= Miyar =

Miyar Miyaru
- village
- Interactive map of Miyar
- Coordinates: 13.1860°N 75.0358°E
- Country: India
- State: Karnataka
- District: Udupi
- Named for: Kambala
- Talukas: Karkala

Government
  - Body: Gram panchayat

Population (2001)
  - Total: 6,659

Languages
  - Official: Kannada Konkani Tulu
- Time zone: UTC+5:30 (IST)
- Postal code: 574107
- ISO 3166 code: IN-KA
- Vehicle registration: KA 20

Miyar or Miyyaru is a village in the southern state of Karnataka, India. It is located in the Karkala taluk of Udupi district in Karnataka. Distance from town 6–7 km.

== Demographics ==
As of 2001 India census, Miyar had a population of 6659 with 3174 males and 3485 females.

== See also ==
- Udupi
- Districts of Karnataka
