= Permannur =

Permannur is a locality in Ullal, Mangalore in Karnataka, India.

Permannur has its own post office with the PIN code 575017.
