= B. K. Somasekhara =

Indian judge of the Karnataka High Court

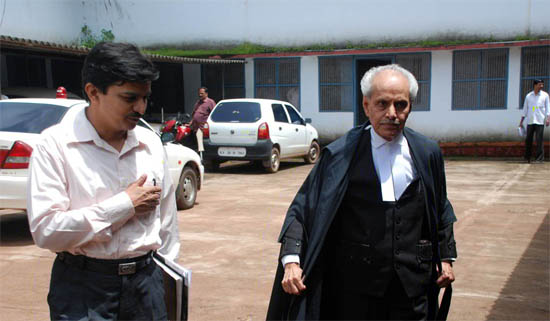
B. K. Somasekhara (right)

B. K. Somasekhara is a retired judge of the Karnataka High Court in India.

== Justice Somasekhara Commission ==
Justice Somasekhara was appointed head of a commission of inquiry instituted in 2008 by the Government of Karnataka to inquire into the 2008 attacks on Christians in southern Karnataka. The commission, which was appointed in late 2008, submitted its report in January 2011.

The commission did not find evidence of any involvement of the state government or the police in the attacks. Nor did it find evidence of a cover-up. Many prominent Christians, including sitting and former judges like M. F. Saldanha had expressed the belief that both complicity and cover-up did happen during the attacks on Christians, basing their belief on hearsay. They had hoped that the commission of inquiry would produce proof endorsing their belief, but this did not happen. Somasekhara concluded in most cases that the district authorities and the police had taken the "appropriate steps regarding the Church and the persons including the required protection." He concluded that the attacks were carried out by "misguided elements" following circulation of literature "which insulted Hindu gods and reports of conversion activity by some Christian groups." The report also stated that "the Roman Catholic church and its leaders were not involved in conversion."

The Archbishop of Bangalore, Bernard Moras, "rejected" the Somasekhara report, saying that "it has failed to address the terms of reference of the Commission and has failed to do justice to the Christian community." He demanded that the state government launch a Central Bureau of Investigation probe into the attacks, also saying that "we will make a representation to the government putting forth our demand. We will make a representation to the chief minister, the governor, various organisations including the Human Rights and the Central government". However, Uday Kumar Shetty, the president of the district unit of the BJP, approved of the report, believing that the report was correct in its assertion that the Sangh Parivar were not involved in the attacks.

The report by this Judge was completed dismissed by the cabinet of Karnataka due to being compromised and other observers called it unfair and funny.
