= Hirgana =

Village in Karkala, Karnataka, India

Hirgana, or Hirgan, is a village in Karkala, Karnataka, India. As of the 2011 census, it had a population of 5,019 people across 1,128 households.
