= Ashok B. Hinchigeri =

Indian judge

Ashok B. Hinchigeri is a former judge of the Karnataka High Court in India.
