= Jayapura, Chickmagalur =

Jayapura
- Village
- Jayapura
- Location in Karnataka, India
- Coordinates: 13.40291°N 75.37250°E
- Country: India
- State: Karnataka
- District: Chikkamagaluru
- Taluk: Koppa

Government
  - Body: Grama Panchayath

Area
  - Total: 13 km^{2} (5.0 sq mi)
- Elevation: 680 m (2,230 ft)

Population (2011)
  - Total: 3,454
  - Density: 270/km^{2} (690/sq mi)

Languages
  - Official: Kannada
- Time zone: UTC+5:30 (IST)
- PIN: 577123
- Telephone code: 08265
- Vehicle registration: KA-18

Jayapura is a small town in Koppa taluk of Chikkamagaluru district of Karnataka, India. This town lies in the Western Ghats.

It lies on Chikkamagaluru - Sringeri highway SH-27. It is 66 km from district headquarters Chikmagalur. Nearest major railheads are Bhadravathi and Kadur Junction at 92 km & 105 km respectively. The nearest International Airport is Mangaluru International Airport at 124 km.

One of the tributaries of Tunga River is Seeta a.k.a Sita River. It flows through the town of Jayapura.
