= Aloysius Paul D'Souza =

Indian Roman Catholic Bishop

His Excellency Aloysius Paul D'Souza
- Bishop of Mangalore
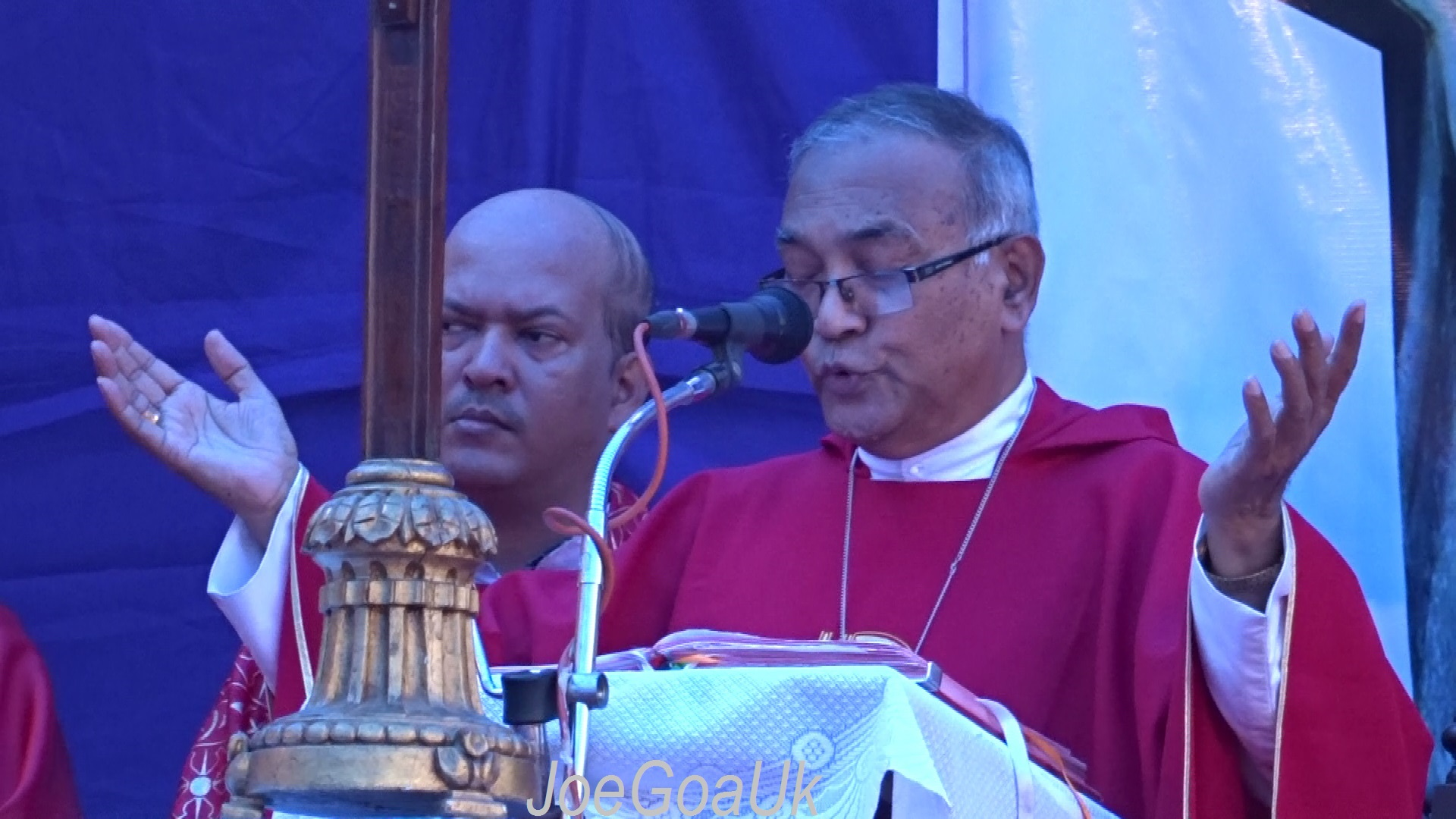
- Church: Roman Catholic church
- See: Diocese of Mangalore
- In office: 1996–2018
- Predecessor: Basil Salvadore D'Souza
- Successor: Peter Paul Saldanha
- Previous post: Auxiliary Bishop

Orders
- Ordination: 8 November 1966
- Consecration: by Basil Salvadore D'Souza, Alphonsus Mathias and Patrick Paul D'Souza

Personal details
- Born: 21 June 1941 (age 85) Bantwal, Karnataka, India
- Motto: COMPASSION

Aloysius Paul D'Souza (Konkani: अलोय्सिउस पौल डी सोझा (Devanagari), ಎಲೋಷಿಯಸ್ ಪಾವ್ಲ್ ಡಿ'ಸೋಜಾ (Kannada); born 21 June 1941) is the former Bishop of the Roman Catholic Diocese of Mangalore. He was consecrated on 8 November 1996, succeeding his predecessor Basil Salvadore D'Souza.

== Early years ==
Aloysius Paul D'Souza was born on 21 June 1941 in Hekkotu, a neighbourhood in the Agrar suburb of Bantwal, Dakshina Kannada. He was the sixth of seven children to Mathias and Isabella D'Souza. The family belonged to the D'Souza-Kamath clan, a Mangalorean Catholic clan of the same area. One of his brothers Fr. Charles D'Souza is a pastor in the Roman Catholic Archdiocese of Delhi, and one of his sisters Sr. Janis A.C., is a nun in Chandigarh. He completed his primary education at Agrar, and did his pre-university studies at the S. V. S. High School in Bantwal. In 1958, the same year of joining the high school, he joined the St. Joseph's seminary to study for the priesthood.

== Diocesan work ==
D'Souza was ordained as a priest on 3 December 1966, and served as Assistant Priest of the Holy Cross Church, Cordel until 1970. During this time, he graduated from Karnataka University. Impressed by his competence and his creativeness and knowledge of Roman Catholic theology, the then Bishop of Mangalore Basil Salvadore D'Souza appointed D'Souza as the Diocesan Secretary. In 1971, the Diocesan authorities sent him to Rome to do a doctorate in canonical law, where he specialised in Christian Marriage Law. Upon completing his doctorate, he was subsequently appointed as an Advocate of Roman Rota—the supreme tribunal of Catholic Church, thereby becoming the first Indian priest to achieve this distinction. D'Souza is one of only two Indians to qualify as an Advocate of Roman Rota, in which capacity he was Judicial Vicar of the Mangalore Tribunal from 1984.

D'Souza returned to Mangalore in 1976, and was appointed the chancellor of the Mangalore Diocese in 1977. During this time, he was in charge of vocations and founded Gladson Home, a minor seminary in Bolar. He simultaneously held the posts of the Vicar of the Cascia parish from 1988 as well as that of the Director of the Diocesan Council of Catholic Women from 1985. In 1995, he became the first Diocesan priest to be appointed as the first Rector of St. Joseph's Seminary in Jeppu.

== Bishop of Mangalore Diocese ==
On 11 January 1996, the Holy See under Pope John Paul II appointed D'Souza as Auxiliary Bishop of the Mangalore Diocese. Upon Bishop Basil Salvadore D'Souza's sudden death in 1996, he was appointed as titular Bishop on 15 May of the same year. On 27 December, he was formally installed as Bishop of Mangalore.

After becoming Bishop, D'Souza finalised the construction work of the Diocesan Pastoral Centre wherein nine centres are headed by Priests. He strengthened the Canara Organization for Development and Peace (CODP) Institution, and was instrumental in the establishment of Father Muller Medical College; inaugurating its opening in 1999. He is currently the Chairman of Family Living Commission of Central Council of Bishops of India. D'Souza also spearheaded the opening of many other colleges, High schools and Primary schools. He developed and initiated a "Ten Point Program" to be followed in diocese masses, regardless of class, creed or religious affiliation.

- Initiating and developing a program to identify suitable persons to spread Roman Catholicism and instill piety.
- The ward-wise liturgical preparation in parishes.
- Building a voluntary group of people to preach and practice Christian principles.
- Strengthening unity among Christians and initiating inter-religious dialogue.
- Minority Christian movement.
- Strengthening Women's Associations.
- Providing basic necessities to underprivileged people.
- Building Resource Groups at the Ward and Parish level.
- Creation of Christ-centered families.
- Strengthening youths to follow in the path of Christ.

D'Souza organised the World Konkani Conference and the All India Bishops Conference in Mangalore. He translated the Bible into Konkani in a mini-pocket form. He has made strenuous efforts into propagating Roman Catholicism in Mangalore, as well as promoting communal harmony among the local populace.

== See also ==
- Monsignor Ambrose Madtha
- Roman Catholic Diocese of Mangalore
