= Kulshekar =

- Locality
- Country: India
- State: Karnataka
- City: Mangaluru

Kulshekar is a locality in Mangaluru city, Karnataka, India. It lies on national highway 13 which connects Mangaluru to Chitradurga. It is nearly 5 km from Mangalore central railway station. This city was built by a Alupa king Kulshekara 1 according to the stone inscription found in Shree veeranarayana temple, kulshekara .This happens to be the oldest Tulu lipie writing found till date.
