= Father Muller Medical College =

Indian medical college

Coordinates: 12°51′58″N 74°51′43″E

- ಫಾದರ್ ಮುಲ್ಲರ್ ಮೆಡಿಕಲ್ ಕಾಲೇಜು
- Motto: 'Heal and Comfort'
- Type: Private Religious Minority Medical College and Hospital
- Established: 1991
- Affiliations: Rajiv Gandhi University of Health Sciences
- Dean: Dr. Anthony Sylvian D'Souza
- Location: Fr. Muller's Road, Kankanady, Mangaluru – 575002, Karnataka, India, Mangaluru, Karnataka, India
- Website: fathermuller.edu.in

Father Muller Medical College is a private medical school located at Kankanady in Mangaluru, Karnataka. It is a part of the Father Muller Charitable Institutions (FMCI).

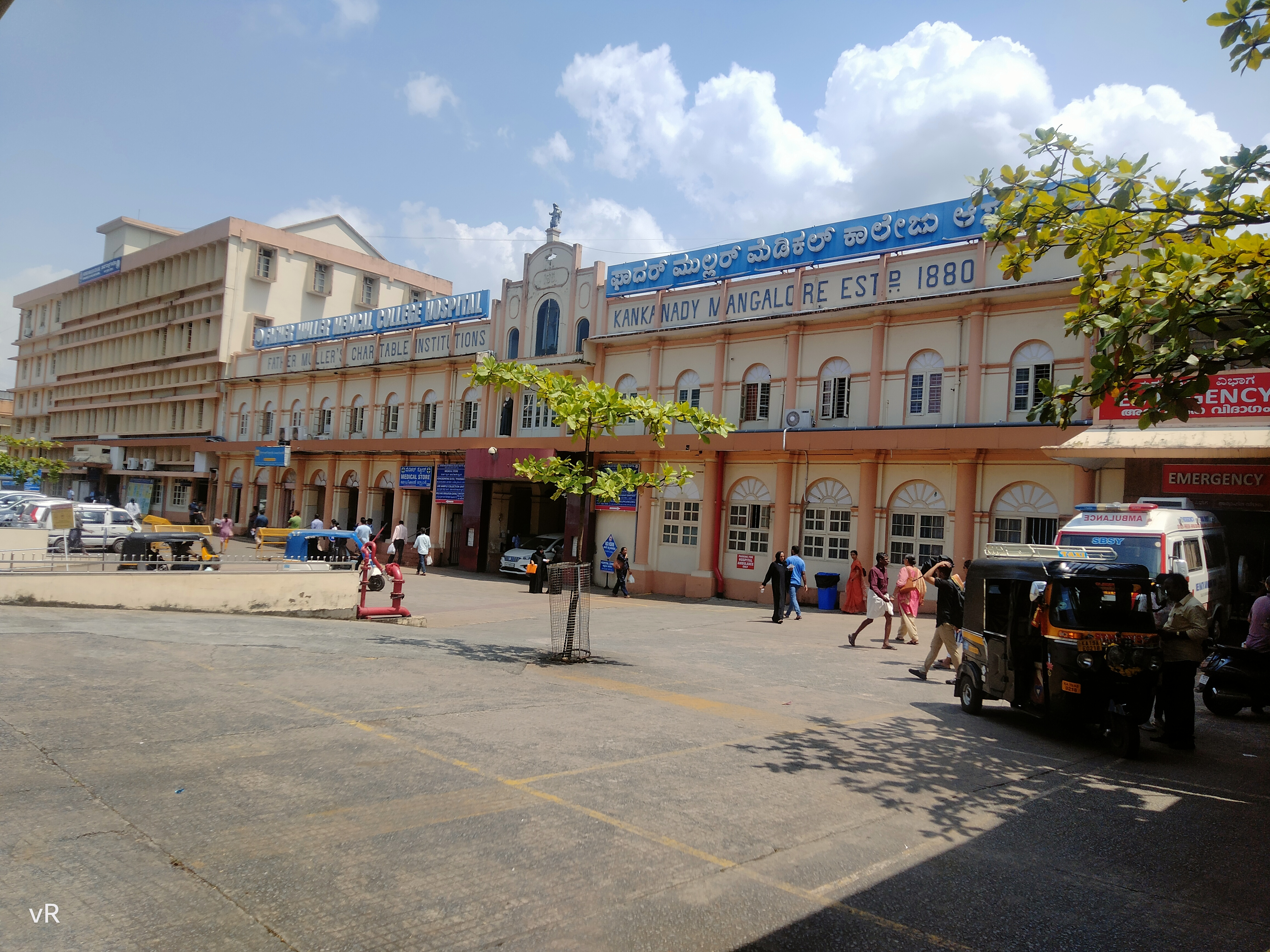
Father Muller Medical College Mangalore-front view

== History ==
Father Muller Hospital opened its doors to the people of South Canara in 1880. It was founded by Fr. Augustus Muller S.J, a German Jesuit priest who dispensed homeopathic medicines under a Banyan tree. It went on to become a Leprosy hospital (now known as the St Joseph's Leprosy Hospital) and then into a fully fledged hospital. It started the School of Nursing which offered diplomas in General Nursing and Midwifery (GNM) and later the College of Nursing which offered degree in Bachelors of Nursing Science.

In 1989, Fr. Muller Institute of Medical Education and Research was duly constituted. Fr. Muller's Institute of Medical Education and Research (FMIMER) started in 1991 with postgraduate courses and then went on to include other courses under its banner, including Bachelors in Physiotherapy (1994–95), M.Sc in Hospital Administration (1996) and Bachelor of Medicine and Surgery (MBBS) course in 1999. It was thereby raised to the status of Medical College.

Father Muller college has installed a college management software for workflow automation of the entire campus to help streamline the campus processes and benefit the management, faculty to manage the college workflow.

Fr. Muller's also boasts a chapel; the St. Joseph's Chapel, inaugurated in 2005 — the post-Centennial silver jubilee year of Fr. Muller Charitable Institutions.

== Administration ==
The college is fully run by the Diocese of Mangalore with its president being Most Rev. Dr. Peter Paul Saldanha, Bishop Of Mangalore. Others in the administration include:

- Rev Fr.Richard Coelho — Director, F.M.C.I.
- Dr.Anthony Sylvian D'Souza — Dean
- Rev. Fr. Ajith Menezes — Administrator, Fr. Muller Medical College Hospital

== Attached teaching hospitals ==
The college is affiliated to the Fr. Muller Medical College Hospital. They have another attached hospital at Thumbay, Mangalore called the Father Muller Hospital, Thumbay which acts as a rural connect as well as a post graduate training hospital. The college rural health care centre is located at Mullerkad, near Kavoor.

Students and interns posted in the Department of Community Medicine undergo postings at public health centres in Surathkal and Jeppu as well as rural hospitals in Belthangady, Badyar in Dakshina Kannada district and Honnavar, Uttara Kannada district.

The college conducts regular health camps in far-flung areas in and around Dakshina Kannada and Udupi districts.

== Undergraduate courses ==
The college offers a four-and-a-half-year MBBS course affiliated to Rajiv Gandhi University of Health Sciences with a one-year compulsory rotating internship. There are 150 seats: All the seats are filled through KEA ( Karnataka Examinations Authority) counselling for candidates qualified through the All India NEET examination.

The college offers courses in B.P.T. (Bachelors in Physiotherapy), B.Sc. M.L.T. (Medical Laboratory Technology), B.A.S.L.P. (Bachelor in Audiology and Speech-Language Pathology) and B.Sc. Radiography.

== Postgraduate courses ==
Postgraduate degree (MD/MS) and diploma in specialties which include Medicine, Surgery, Paediatrics, Obstetrics and Gynaecology, ENT, Ophthalmology, Orthopaedics, Radio-diagnosis, Psychiatry and Pathology and master's degree (M.Sc) in Hospital Administration.

== Events ==
The events organised by the institution include "Big Bang" in 2003, "The Quest" in 2004, "The Arena" in 2005, "The Conquest" in 2006, "The Apocalypse" in 2007, "Chakravyuh" in 2008, "Argonautica" in 2009 and "Solaris" in 2010.

Fr. Muller's also conducts an inter-college competition known as the "Mullerfest" annually.

Every year Fr. Muller's holds several events. One was "Deca Fest" in 2010. It concluded on 21 February 2010 after about 30 scheduled events.

The college organises sporting events which include Football, Basketball, Throwball, Volleyball, Badminton, Table-Tennis and athletic meet "Velocity" at interclass and intercollegiate level (RGUHS Mysore Zone tournaments).

As many as 576 students belonging to different streams received degrees during the Graduation Ceremony and Institutions’ Day of Father Muller Charitable Institutions (FMCI) on 13 March 2015.
