= Masjid Zeenath Baksh =

Mosque in Karnataka, India

- Baliye Palli
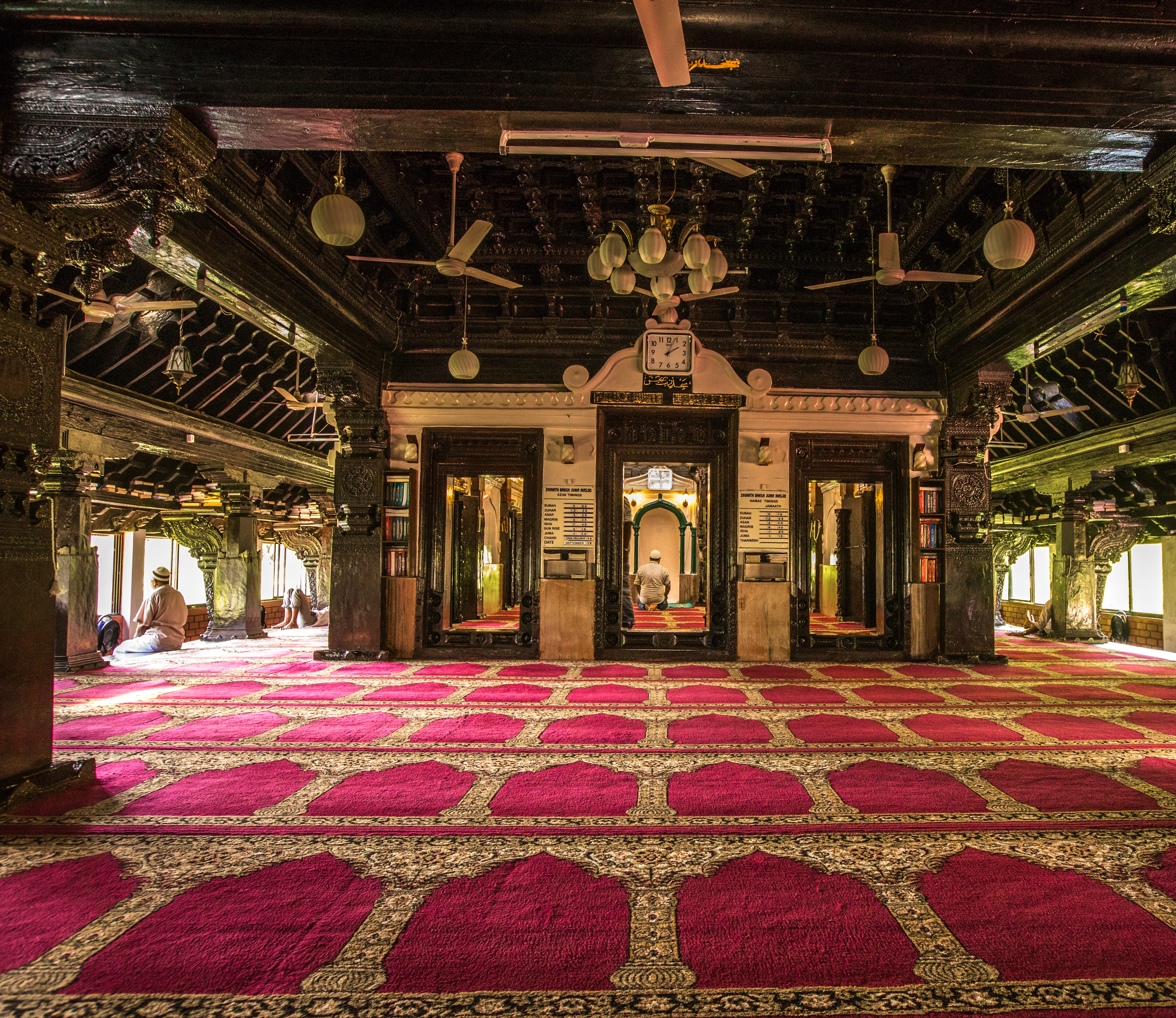
- The mosque prayer hall, in 2016

- Location of the mosque in Karnataka

Religion
- Affiliation: Islam
- Ecclesiastical or organizational status: Mosque
- Status: Active

Location
- Location: Bunder, Mangalore, Dakshina Kannada, Karnataka
- Country: India
- Interactive map of Masjid Zeenath Baksh
- Coordinates: 12°51′53″N 74°49′56″E

Architecture
- Type: Mosque architecture
- Style: Dravidian
- Founder: Malik Deenar
- Funded by: Tipu Sultan (18th century)
- Completed: 22 AH (642/643 CE); 18th century (renovations)

Specifications
- Capacity: 2,000 worshippers
- Dome: One
- Minaret: Four
- Materials: Teak; rosewood

The Zeenath Baksh Juma Masjid (lit. ''Mosque that reflects beauty''), commonly known as Masjid Zeenath Baksh, and also known as Beliye Palli, is the third oldest mosque in India and the oldest in the state of Karnataka, constructed in 22 AH (642/643 CE). The mosque is located in the Bunder area in the city of Mangalore and is known for its pure Indian style, reminiscent of Dravidian architecture.

The mosque was established by the family of sahabah of Muhammad, and is of exceptional importance to Muslims in the region.

== History ==
Arab traders have had a warm longstanding relationship with the local population as well as the rulers of the western coastal belt of India from the earliest of the times, and have engaged in trade through the Arabian Sea.

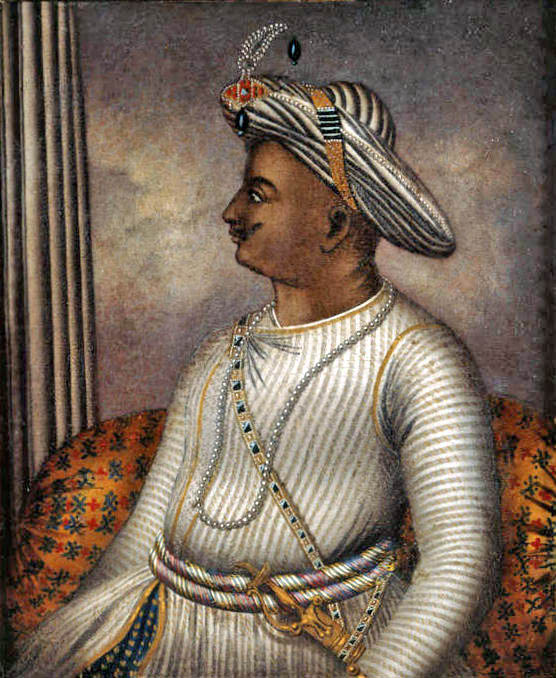
Tipu Sultan, the sultan of Mysore undertook the renovation task of the mosque.

On the advent of Islam in the 7th century, a team of Arab Muslim traders, under the leadership of Islamic propagator Hazarath Mohammed Malik Bin Deenar explored the Malabar Coast and landed at Kodungallur. The then ruler, Chera king Cheraman Perumal, was appeased with the extremely pious, honest, disciplinary behaviour of Malik Deenar and his companions, and provided the traders with accommodation, necessary facilities, and also a place to trade. On their request, the king also provided Deenar and his men with land to build mosques.

The Masjid Zeenath Baksh was the second out of the ten mosques built by them following Cheraman Juma Mosque of Kodungallur. The masjid was inaugurated on Friday the 22nd of the month of Jumada al-awwal, (Note: c. 18 April 643 CE.) 22 AH (642/643 CE), with Malik Bin Abdullah being appointed as the first Khazi.

In the later half of the 18th century, Tipu Sultan, the sultan of Mysore renovated and beautified the mosque with exquisite and rare wooden carving that adorn the pillars and ceiling of the mosque. During this time Tipu Sultan renamed the mosque from "Malik Dinar Valya Juma-ath Masjid" to "Zeenath Baksh Jama Masjid", in honour of his daughter.

== Architecture ==
Although a mosque, the Masjid Zeenath Baksh has characteristics similar to that of the many Hindu temples found in the region, most notably the temple tank for wazū, found within the mosque's grounds. The prayer hall is on a plinth with an open colonnade running around the building under heavy overhanging eaves, also with carvings.

The Masjid Zeenath Baksh is the only mosque in the state of Karnataka made entirely of wood. The main highlight of the mosque is the wooden inner sanctum consisting of 16 pillars made of teak. The structure is adorned with patterns of symbols, bells, and flowers. It also has life stories of Muhammad inscribed in it. Teak and rosewood have been used to construct the floor, ceiling, walls, and doors of the mosque. The roof is tiled.

== Gallery ==
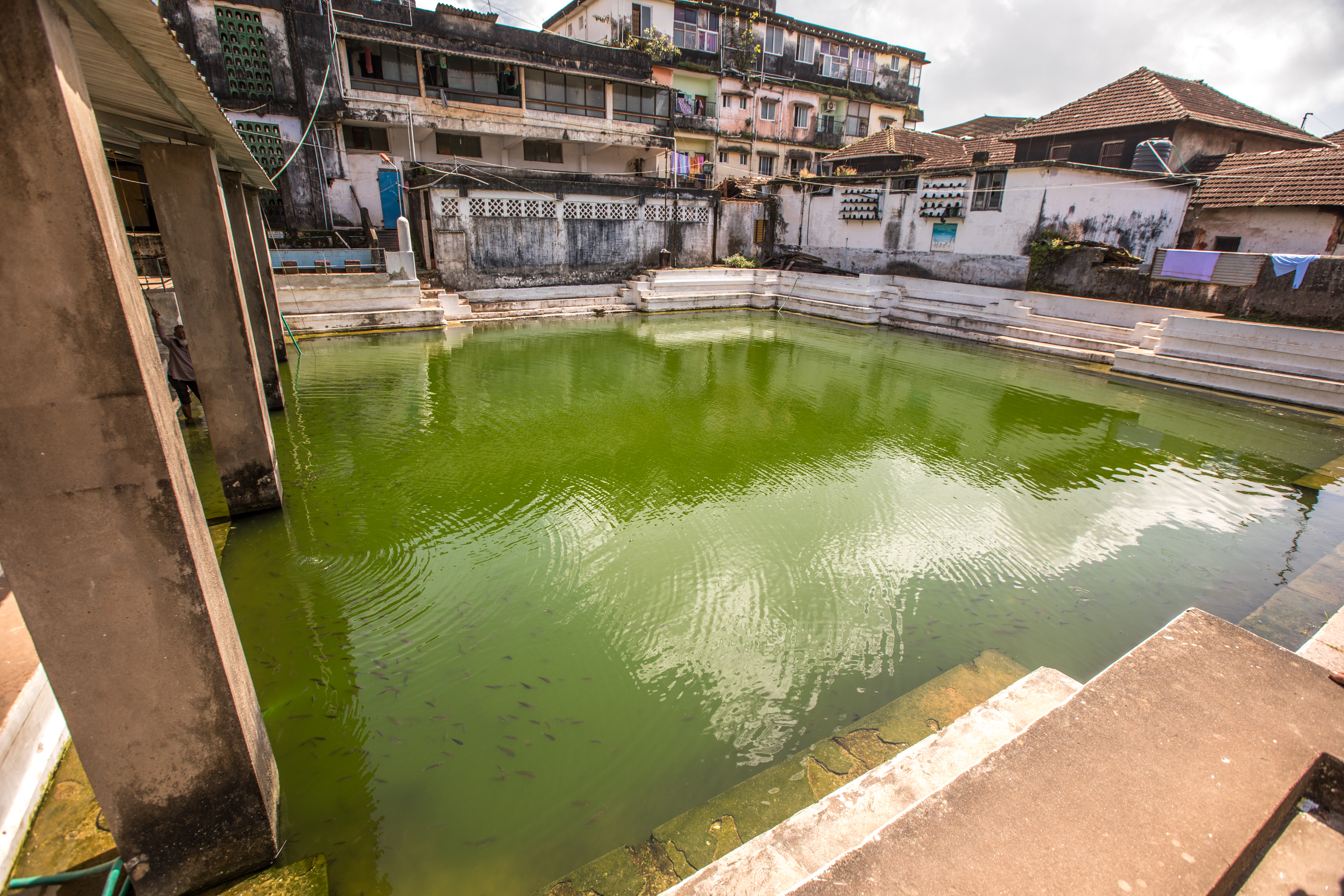
The water tank within the mosque grounds

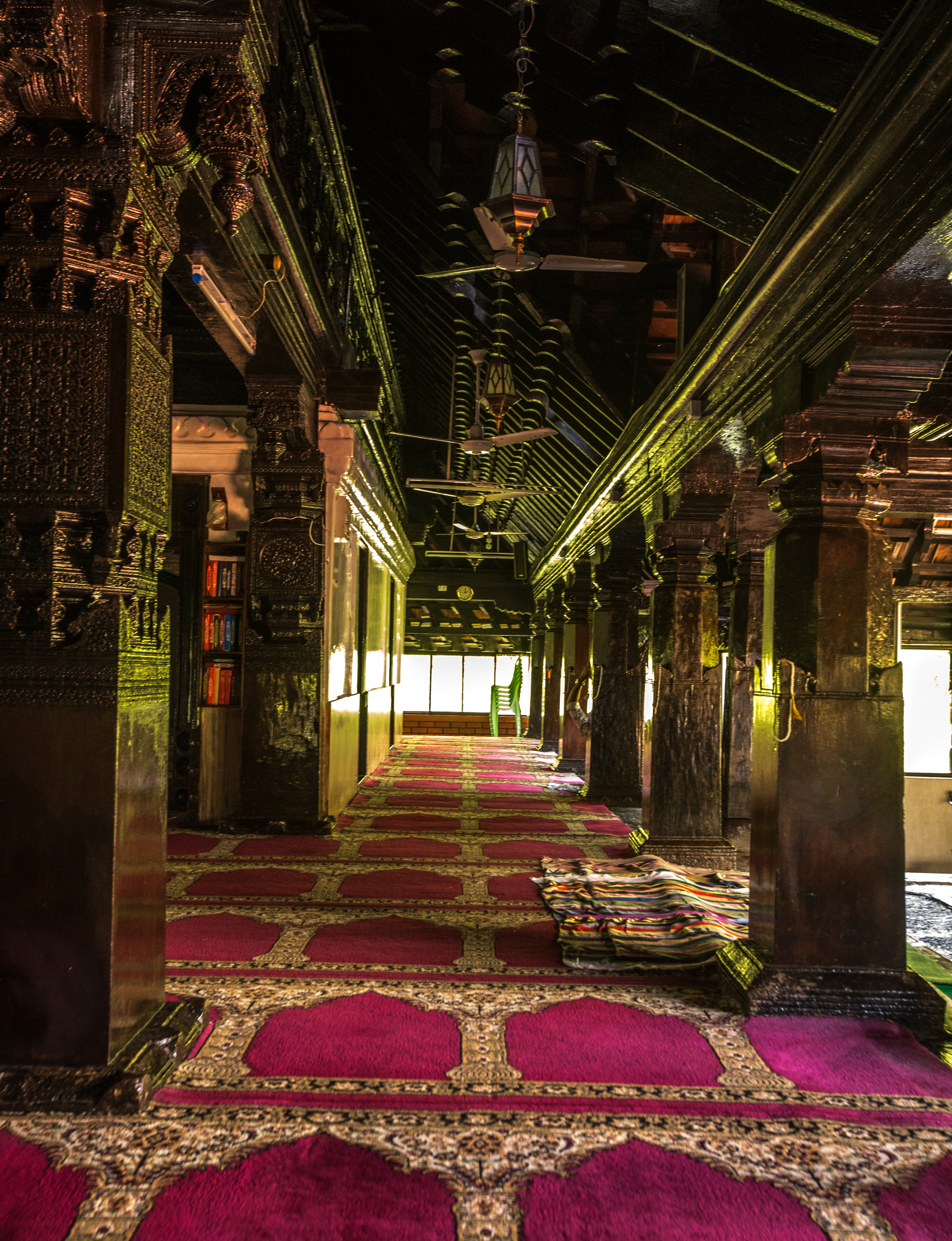
The wood carvings on the interior pillars

== See also ==
- Islam in India
- List of mosques in India
- List of oldest mosques in India
