= Aramboor =

- village
- Location in Karnataka, India Aramboor (India)
- Coordinates: 12°31′52″N 75°24′38″E
- Country: India
- State: Karnataka
- District: Dakshina Kannada

Languages
  - Official: Tulu, Kannada
- Time zone: UTC+5:30 (IST)
- Postal code: 574314

Aramboor is a small village in the Sullia taluk of the Dakshina Kannada district in Karnataka, India. It is famous for its hanging bridge, Mookambika bajana mandira, Badar Juma Masjid, Govt Primary School, Payashwini River, Vayanat kulavan daivastana.
