= Kakkinje =

- village
- Location in Karnataka, India
- Coordinates: 12.9796°N 75.4034°E
- Country: India
- State: Karnataka
- District: Dakshina Kannada

Languages
  - Official: Kannada
- Time zone: UTC+5:30 (IST)
- PIN: 574228
- Vehicle registration: KA 21

Kakkinje is a village located in Dakshina Kannada District of Karnataka State in India and comes under Belthangady Taluk. The village incorporates an eclectic mix of religious denominations, including Christians, Hindus and Muslims. This place is located on the foothills of Western Ghats. Agriculture is the main income of this place. Traditional crops like paddy and arecanut are cultivated in large scale. Recent times rubber cultivation is widely undertaken due to the efforts of Rubber Board of India. Christian settlers from Central Travancore are seen in large numbers.

The nearest airport and railway station is Mangalore which is about 75 km. Puttur railway station along the Mangalore-Bangalore railway line is only about 30 km. Educational institutions have started coming up due to the vibrant economy. The nearest institution of higher education is the SDM College in Ujire.
