= Mangaluru District =

Mangaluru Dakshina Kannada(until October 2026),South Canara
- District of Karnataka
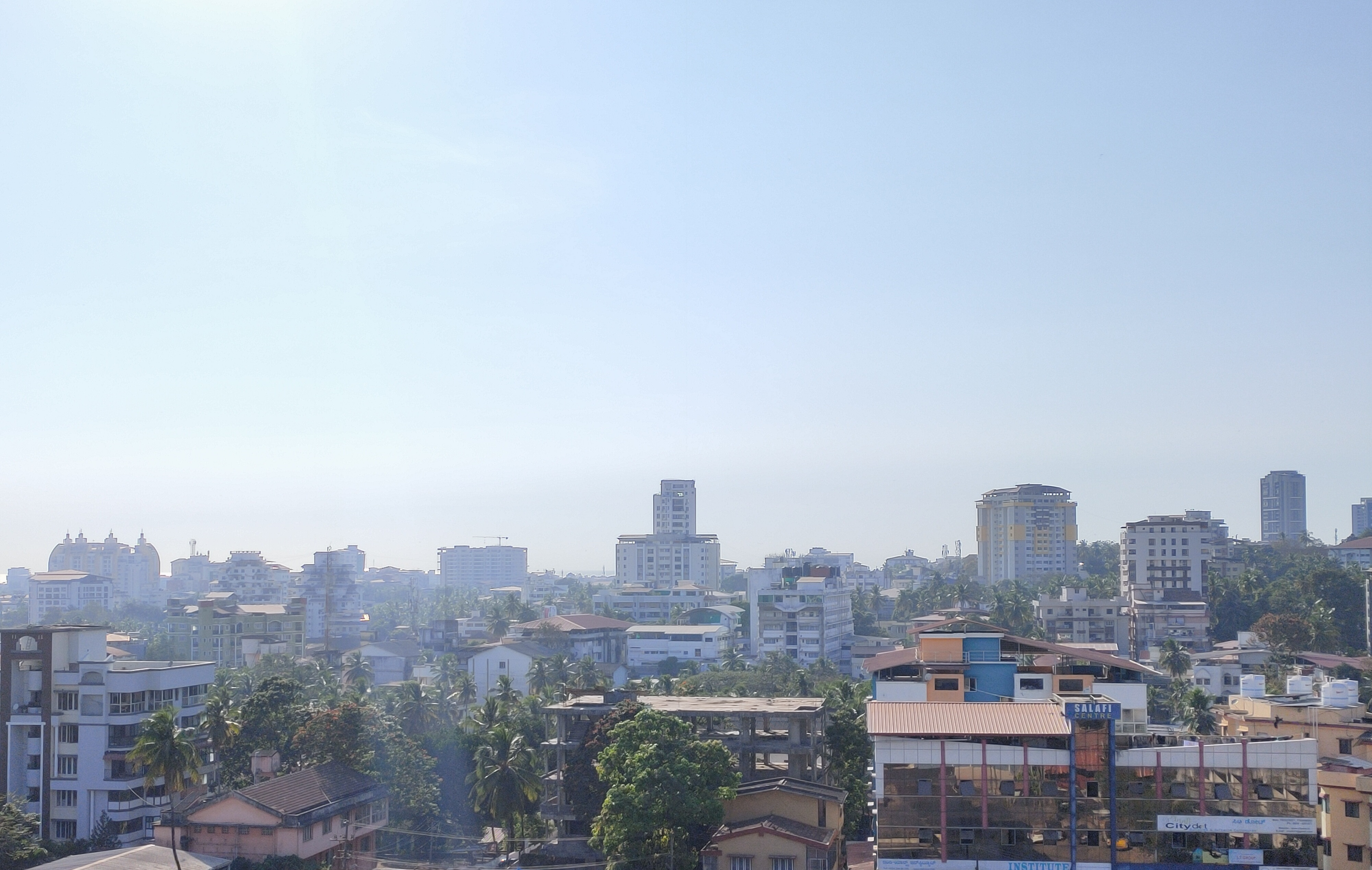
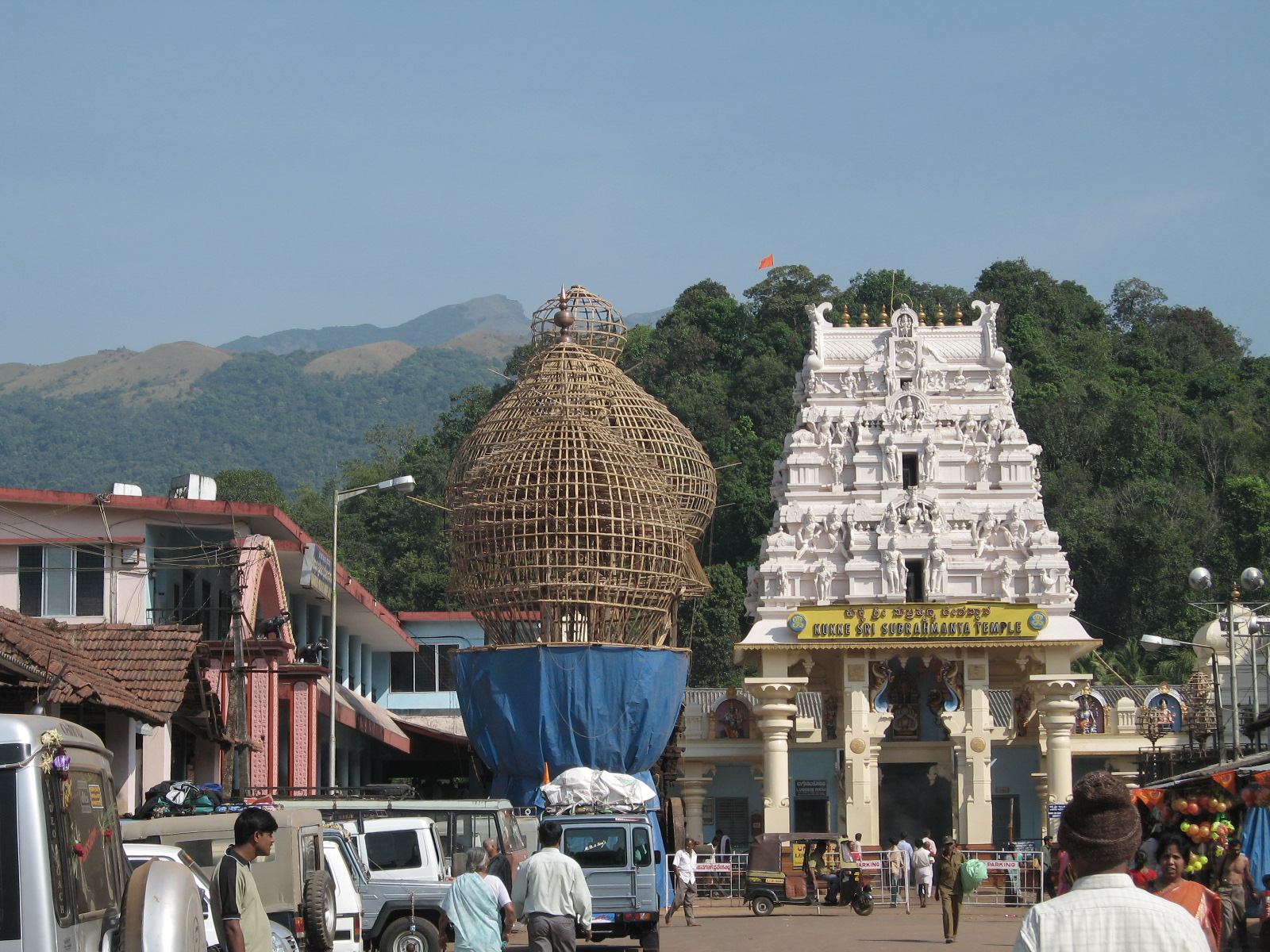
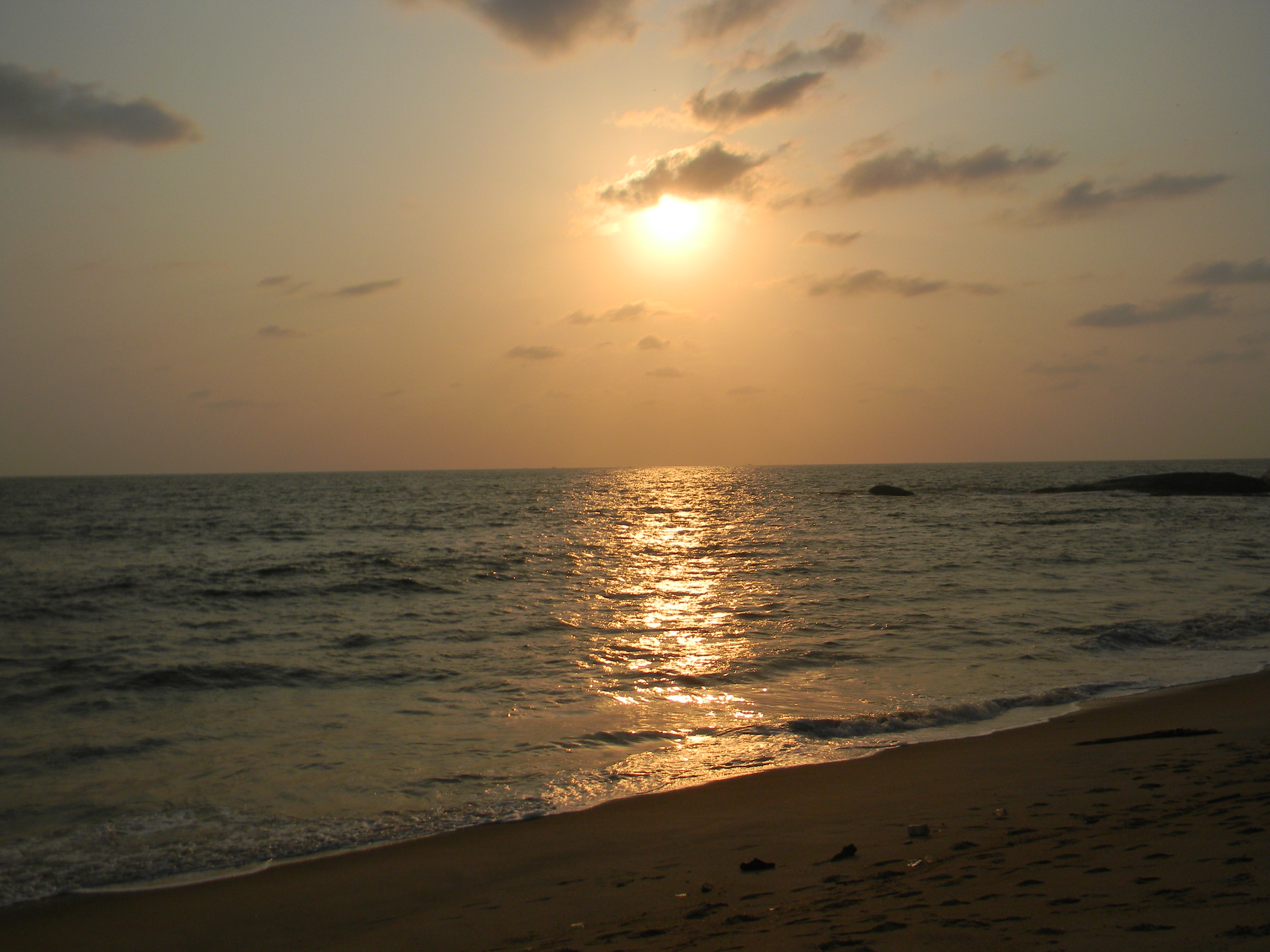
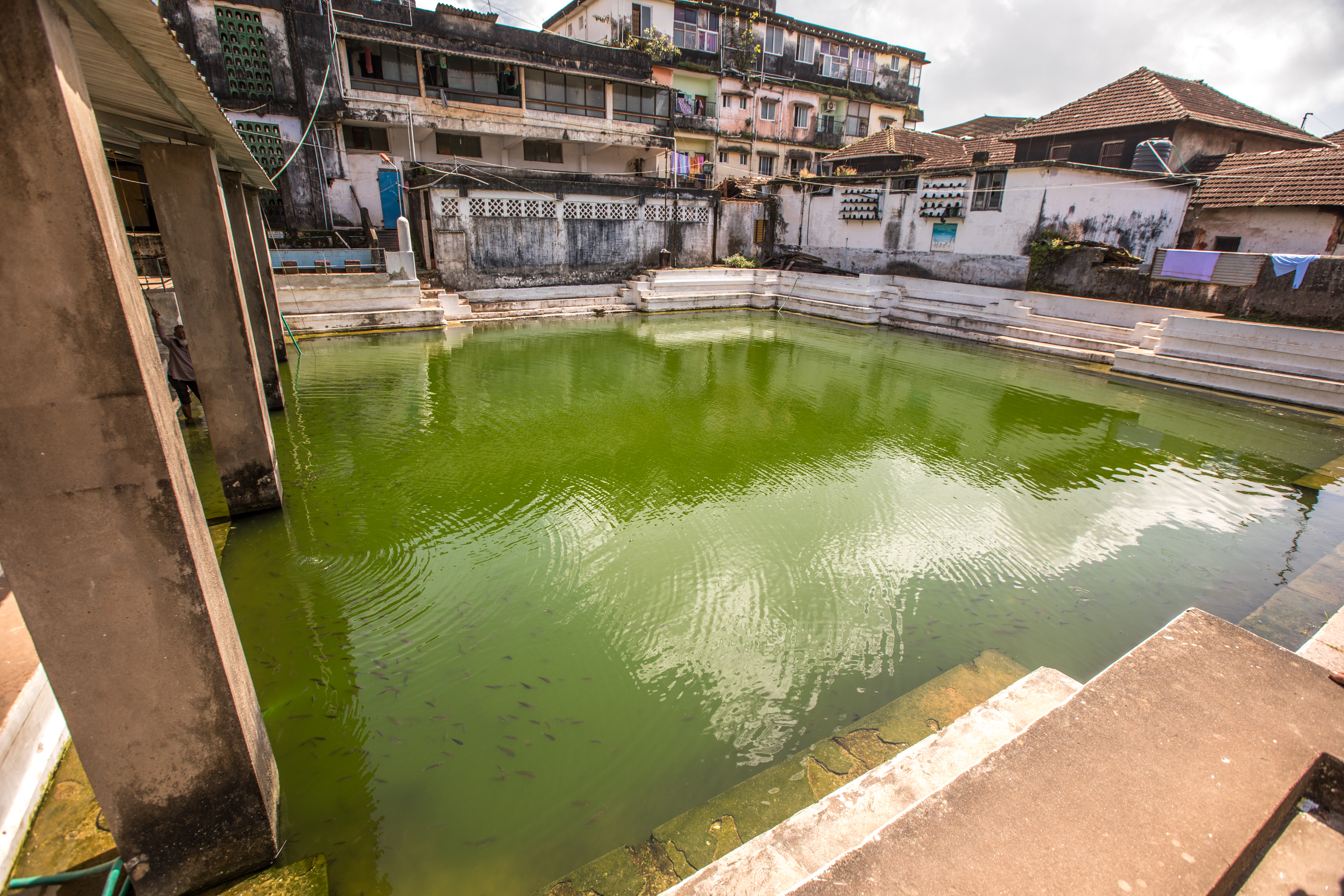
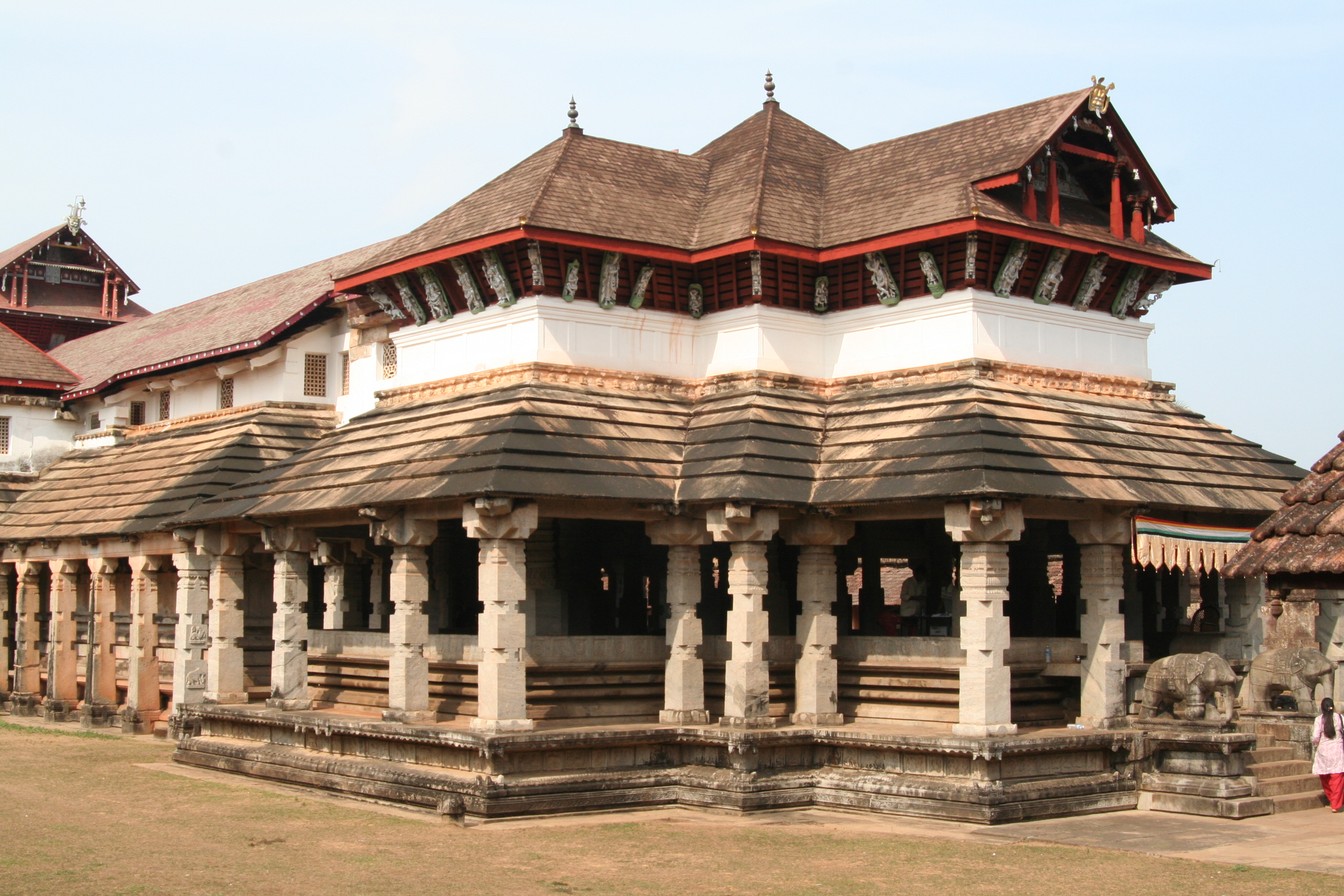
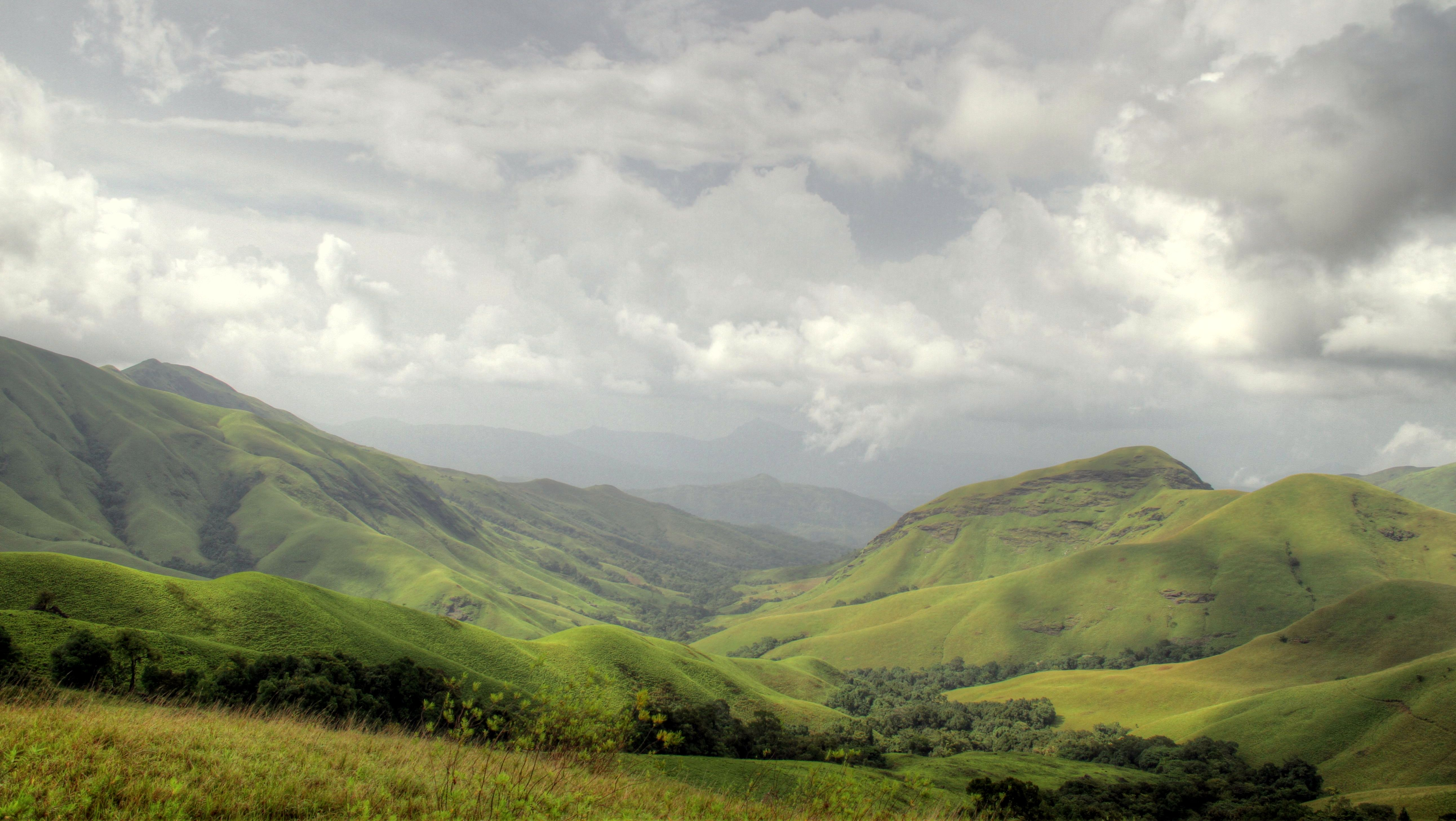
- Clockwise from top: View of Mangalore skyline from Kankanadi, Tannirbhavi Beach, Saavira Kambada Basadi in Moodabidri, Western Ghats at Kudremukh, Pool at Masjid Zeenath Baksh, Kukke Subramanya Temple,

- Location in Karnataka
- Coordinates: 12.87°N 74.88°E
- Country: India
- State: Karnataka
- Division: Mysore
- Region: Kanara, Tulunadu
- Headquarters: Mangaluru
- Talukas: Mangaluru; Sullia; Puttur; Belthangady; Moodabidri; Bantwal; Mulki; Ullala; Kadaba

Government
  - Type: District administration
  - Deputy Commissioner: Darshan H V
  - Commissioner of Police, Mangalore City Police: Sudheer Kumar Reddy CH, IPS
  - Superintendent of Police, Dakshina Kannada District Police: Dr. Arun K, IPS
  - MP: Captain Brijesh Chowta
  - MLAs: Harish Poonja (Belthangady), Umanatha Kotian (Moodabidri), Y. Bharath Shetty (Mangalore City North), D. Vedavyas Kamath (Mangalore City South), U. T. Khader (Mangalore), (Mangalore City South), U. Rajesh Naik (Bantval), Ashok Kumar Rai (Puttur), Bhagirathi Murulya (Sullia) (SC)

Area
  - Total: 4,559 km^{2} (1,760 sq mi)
- Highest elevation: 1,115 m (3,658 ft)

Population
  - Total: 2,089,649
  - Density: 457/km^{2} (1,180/sq mi)
  - Urban: 996,086

Languages
  - Official: Kannada,Tulu
- Time zone: UTC+5:30 (IST)
- Telephone code: + 91 (0824)
- Vehicle registration: KA-19 (Hampankatta, Mangalore south); KA-21 (Puttur, Sullia, Belthangady); KA-62 (Surathkal, Mangalore north); KA-70 (B C Road)
- Airport: Mangalore International Airport
- Seaport: New Mangalore Port
- Website: dk.nic.in

Mangaluru or Dakshina Kannada district is located in the state of Karnataka in India, with its headquarters in the coastal city of Mangaluru. The district covers an area nestled between the Western Ghats and the Arabian Sea. Dakshina Kannada receives abundant rainfall during the Indian monsoon. It is bordered by Udupi district (formerly a part of this district) to the north, Chikmagalur district to the northeast, Hassan district to the east, Kodagu to the southeast and Kasaragod district of Kerala to the south. According to the 2011 census of India, Dakshina Kannada district had a population of 2,089,649. It is the only district in Karnataka to have all modes of transport - road, rail, water and air - due to the presence of a major hub, Mangaluru. This financial district is also known as the Cradle of Indian banking.

== History ==
=== Legend ===
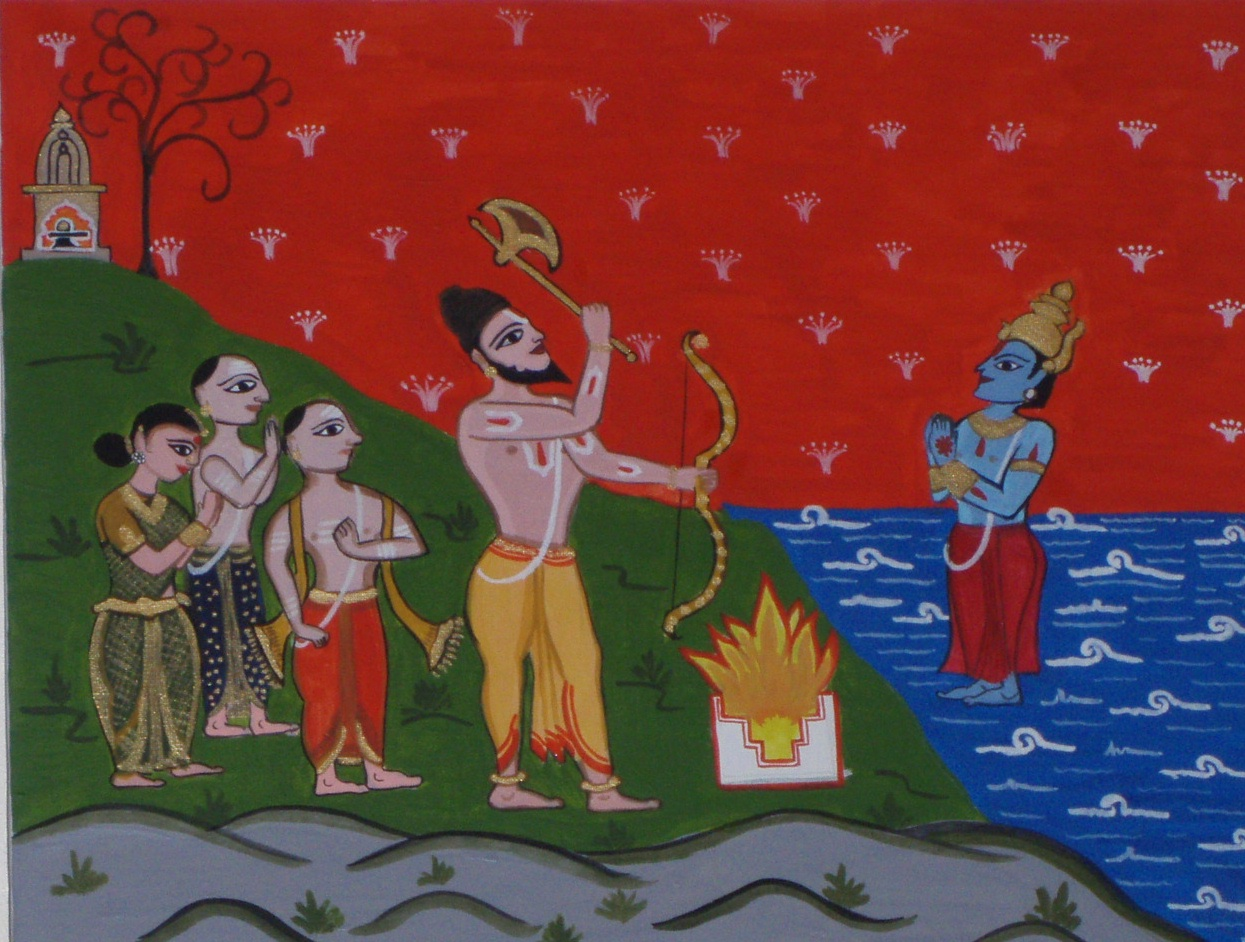
Parshurama asks Varuna to create the western coast from the sea

As per the Gramappadhathi, Dakshina Kannada (along with the rest of the west coast) was created by Parshurama standing on top of the Western Ghats, and caused the land to rise from the sea by throwing his axe. It was then given to 64 families of Brahmins to settle. He created a temple on Kunjaragiri Hill in memory of his mother. Kutashila, spoken of in the Markandeya Purana, is believed to be the town of Kollur, the abode of Mookambika Devi. Several rivers in the district, including the Netravati, are believed to be mentioned in the Markandeya Purana. Other traditions in the local Paddanas speak of Mayurasharma's inviting of Brahmins from Ahichchhatraa and his organisation of the district.

=== Early history ===
The earliest recording of what would become Dakshina Kannada district is found in Sangam literature, specifically in a poem of Mamulanar. M Govinda Pai identified the kingdom of Harita mentioned in the Harivamsha as Dakshina Kannada, specifically correlating the word Mudugara with Moger, part of the title of the fishermen community in the district. Pai speculated as an alternative that the entire strip from North Kanara to Kanyakumari was inhabited by Nagas who worshipped snakes, and that the character Shankachuda mentioned in several works including the work Nagananda, was from this region. Several scholars identified the Satiyaputras mentioned in Ashoka's edicts as belonging to this region.

The region, owing to its position on the west coast, also finds mention in Greek sources. Pliny mentioned pirates that infested the coast between the regions of Muziris and Nitiras, which many scholars have identified with the Netravati. Ptolemy mentions two ports: Barace and Maganur which modern-day scholars identified with Barsur and Mangalore, respectively. Ptolemy mentioned an inland centre of pirates called Oloikhera, which has been identified with Alvakheda, or territories of the Alupas. The region also finds mention in a play called the Chariton Mime, which contains dialogue in a language scholars have variously interpreted as an early form of Kannada or Tulu.

=== Alupas ===
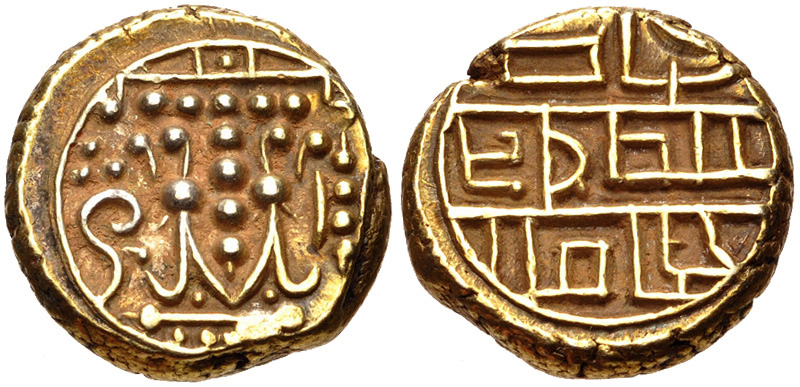
Alupa coins, 14th century

The Alupas (ಆಳುಪರು) ruled the erstwhile Dakshina Kannada region between the 8th and 14th century CE. Their origins go back further, and if Greek identifications are to be believed the Alupas may have been prominent local chiefs since the 2nd century CE. The Halmidi inscription of 450 CE mentions an Alupa chief fighting as a commander of the Kadambas in a battle against the Kekayas and Pallavas. In a stone inscription near Gudnapur dated to c. 500 CE, the Alupas are mentioned as subordinates to the Kadambas. In 602, the Mahakuta Pillar inscription refers to the Aluvas as being conquered by Kirtivarman I of the Chalukyas. In the Aihole inscription, it appears the Chalukyas had crushed an Alupa rebellion in the early 7th century. During the reign of Vinayadtiya, it is mentioned how the Alupa chiefs helped the king restore peace after the disastrous war with the Pallavas. This Alupa ruler, Aluvarassa I, travelled from Mangalapura (modern Mangalore). After a civil war, and the overthrow of the Chalukyas by Dantidurga in 753, the Alupas entered into tributary relations with the Pallavas. Starting in the 9th century, the Alupas began to lose territory and Rashtrakuta king Krishna II sent a military expedition which placed the Alupas firmly under Rashtrakuta control. When the Cholas occupied Alupa territory during the reign of Rajaraja I, Bankideva Alupendra drove the Cholas out. In the late 11th and early 12th century, the Alupas had to acknowledge the suzerainty of the Chalukyas of Kalyani, before it was attacked by the Hoysalas and forced to acknowledge their suzerainty. An Old Malayalam inscription (Ramanthali inscriptions), dated to 1075 CE, mentioning king Kunda Alupa, the ruler of Alupa dynasty of Mangalore, can be found at Ezhimala (the former headquarters of Mushika dynasty) near Kannur in Kerala.

=== Vijayanagara Empire ===
A 1204 inscription shows Mangalore had regained its position as capital from Barkur. Over the course of the 13th and 14th centuries, Alupa power declined steadily until Alupakheda was annexed by the Vijayangara Empire. The first Vijayanagara inscription in the district was from 1345 in Attavara. For the next three centuries, the empire administered Tulu Nadu with a firm hand especially as Tulu Nadu was the conduit through which much of their western trade, and how they secured horses from Arabia. Harihara Raya built a fort at Barkur, and instituted a revenue system where half of crops went to the cultivators while the rest were divided between landlords, Brahmins and the state. Ibn Batutta mentioned how the Muslim governor of 'Honore' paid tribute to a Vijayanagara revenue collector in Barkur with the title Wadiyar. While passing from Karwar to Kozhikode, he stayed in a port identified as 'Manjarur', identified as Mangalore, and noted the country to be prosperous but with few wheeled vehicles.

Two hero stones dated to 1398 in Bhatkal record a rebellion in Tulu Nadu. At this time, the Alupa rule was basically ended and replaced with Barakur and Mangaluru rajyas, sometimes united into one Tulu Rajya. The governors were often transferred: during the reign of Devaraya II, there were eight governors of Mangaluru rajya. During the usurpation of Saluva Narasimharaya, he did much to improve the horse trade, which had suffered under previous rulers with his governor Mallappa Nayaka. When Krishnadevaraya came to power, he largely relied on the local feudal chiefs to remain obedient. Sadashiva Nayaka of Keladi ruled over Barakuru, Mangaluru, Chandragutti and Araga rajyas.

=== Portuguese arrival ===
When the Portuguese first arrived in the region, they described Tulunadu as a prosperous trading country populated by both Moors (Muslims) and Genitles (Hindus). They were received well by Krishnadevaraya. But when they discovered Muslim merchants in Mangalore and Barakur, they blockaded the rivers leading there in 1526, they conquered Mangalore facing some resistance. Franciscan friars began preaching in Mangalore and the surrounding regions, while the Portuguese began collecting tribute in grain and other goods. In 1530, the Portuguese stormed the Mangalore fort again facing resistance they easily annihilated. In 1547, Aliya Rama Raya entered into a treaty with the Portuguese by which all imports and exports passed through their hands. This treaty was highly unpopular among the local chiefs, who often resisted Portuguese tributary collection. Some chiefs even supported the alliance of sultanates which defeated Aliya Rama Raya at the Battle of Talikota, hoping to get rid of Portuguese influence. In 1571, this failed when the Portuguese defeated Bijapur at Goa.

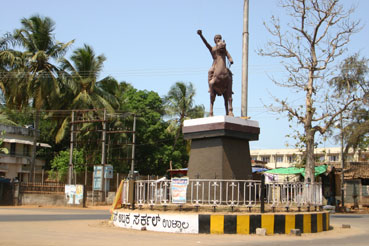
Statue of Rani Abbakka

Rani Abbakka, the Chowta wife of Banga Raja and the Queen of Ullal, fought the Portuguese. She stopped paying tribute to the Portuguese, causing them to send a fleet to Mangalore and force a settlement, but soon she aided the enemies of the Portuguese and again stopped tribute payment. In 1566, she defeated a Portuguese expedition and killed its commander, causing the Portuguese in Goa to send an armada to subdue her in 1567. On 15 January 1568, however, the Portuguese defeated the Rani and forced her to sign a new treaty.

=== Nayakas of Keladi ===
The Nayakas of Keladi were a Veerashaiva family which had ruled a large portion of Tulu Nadu starting in the 16th century, when they had control over Mangalore and the rest of Tulu Nadu. Eventually in 1613, Venkatappa Nayaka I became independent and was the most powerful ruler in Tulu Nadu, taking territory which owed fealty to Bijapur and aiding Rani Abbakka. Under Shivappa Nayaka, the Nayakas of Keladi, now with capital at Bidnur, conquered the entirety of Tulu Nadu. Shivappa Nayaka utterly defeated the power of the Portuguese in Tulu Nadu. His successor made a treaty with the Portuguese where they could set up unarmed factories in Mangalore and Basrur, but were not to convert the locals. His successor, Keladi Chennamma, is famous for sheltering Rajaram and fending off Aurangzeb's forces. She also put down rebellions of Tuluva chieftains. During this time Arab traders, who were kicked out by the Portuguese, burnt Mangalore and other trade towns. In 1714, due to trade disputes, the Portuguese bombarded Mangalore and defeated the ruler Basavappa Nayaka I, who promised to ban Arab traders from entering. From 1757 to 1763, while Queen Veerammaji was looking after the kingdom, the Ali Raja of Kannur along with Maratha followers led a devastating raid into the district. They plundered Manjeshwar and took a large booty from the Kollur Mookambika temple.

=== Mysore rule ===
Due to this unrest, Hyder Ali was able to sack Bidnur in 1763 and annex Tulu Nadu the same year. He conquered Mangaluru, and set a governor Latif Ali Baig. This threatened English shipping in the Arabian Sea, so during the First Anglo Mysore War in 1766 Company soldiers from Bombay conquered Mangaluru. However, as soon as he heard the news of the capture of Bengaluru, Tipu Sultan made a lightning attack on Mangalore and forced the British to retreat only a week after they captured Mangalore. Hyder Ali then confiscated all Portuguese holdings in the region due to their support for the English. In 1770, Hyder Ali made a treaty with the British allowing for rice to be supplied from Mangalore to Bombay. The next year, he gave Portuguese some privileges back such as the ability to evangelize. However, in 1776, Hyder Ali revoked all these privileges, ejected the Portuguese from Mangaluru and built up a large navy in the region.

During the Second Anglo-Mysore War starting in 1781 the British quickly took over most of Tulunadu, as well as Bidnur, due to the treachery of the fort's guardian Iyaz Khan. In March 1783, however, they were forced to capitulate the fort. Tippu also sent a large force to besiege Mangaluru, and after two months took the fort. Tippu's rule was harsh for the local chiefs, who he executed and dispossessed due to their perceived collaboration with the English.

=== British Raj and early resistance ===
During the Fourth Anglo-Mysore War in 1799, the British returned the lands to their feudal chiefs. After Tippu's defeat, the British gave the Raja of Coorg several maganes which had been taken from him by Hyder Ali and set up their administration, with Thomas Munro the first Collector of Kanara. However Vittala Hegde, who had fled when Tippu campaigned in Tulunadu and returned at the start of the Fourth Anglo-Mysore War, began to develop an armed following to retake his lands. His ally Subba Rao attacked the Tehsildar of Kadaba, but was defeated by a British ally, Kumara Hegde. In July 1800, the British pursued the last remnants of Vittala Hedge's army into Shishila Ghat, where they were defeated and many of the chief rebels were arrested.

At this time, the district was in severe distress due to the many bloody wars waged across it. The British deputed an administrator to study the economic condition of Kanara district, which noted severe deprivation in the south but more commerce further north. The Company then imposed harsh revenue demands on the poor peasants, who were already reeling from depression. The peasants organised themselves and participated in a 'no-tax' campaign, forcing the British to rethink their tax policy on the poor. The British then invaded Coorg when its ruler objected to British interference and took all territory of the state below the Western Ghats, adding it to Kanara district.

In 1837, the British faced the Amara Sullia rebellion. After the British had deposed Kalyanaswami, a pretender to the throne of Coorg, he went to Bellare, and gathered a large number of supporters who marched on Puttur. Kalyanaswami defeated two companies of sepoys near Puttur, and Kalyanaswami then marched on Mangalore, causing the British to flee. For two weeks Kalyanaswami held Mangaluru, released prisoners and set the homes of British soldiers alight. When British forces came from Thalassery to Mangalore, his poorly armed forces melted away. Kalyanaswami and other prominent leaders were hanged while others were deported to Singapore.

Before 1860, Dakshina Kannada was part of a district called Kanara, which was under a single administration in the Madras Presidency. In 1860, the British split the area into South Canara and North Canara, the former being retained in the Madras Presidency, while the latter was made a part of Bombay Presidency in 1862. Kundapur Taluk was earlier included in North Kanara but was later re-included in South Kanara. South Kanara included present Dakshina Kannada, Udupi, Kasaragod districts and the Aminidivi Islands.

=== Independence movement ===
During the 1920s, several newspapers in the district drew inspiration from the freedom struggle such as Tilaka Sandesh, Satyagrahi and others. South Kanara participated in the non-cooperation movement led in the district by Karnad Sadashiva Rao. All independence movements gained significant traction in the district, and Gandhi and Nehru both visited Mangalore during the Freedom struggle. In 1942 large numbers of leaders were jailed in the Quit India movement.

=== Post-independence ===
In 1947 South Kanara joined India as part of Madras State. In 1956, the states were reorganised on linguistic lines. The Malayalam-majority Kasaragod subdivision became a part of Kerala, the Aminidivi Islands were joined with the Laccadive and Minicoy islands in a union territory, while the Tulu and Kannada majority Dakshina Kannada subdivision became a district of Mysore State in 1956 which later was renamed Karnataka in 1973. The Udupi district was formed from the northern taluks of Dakshina Kannada in 1997. Later, the Karnataka Government, for the purpose of administration, split the greater Dakshina Kannada district into Udupi and present day Dakshina Kannada districts on 15 August 1997. Three taluks of the former district – Udupi, Karkala and Kundapura – formed the new Udupi district.

== Geography ==
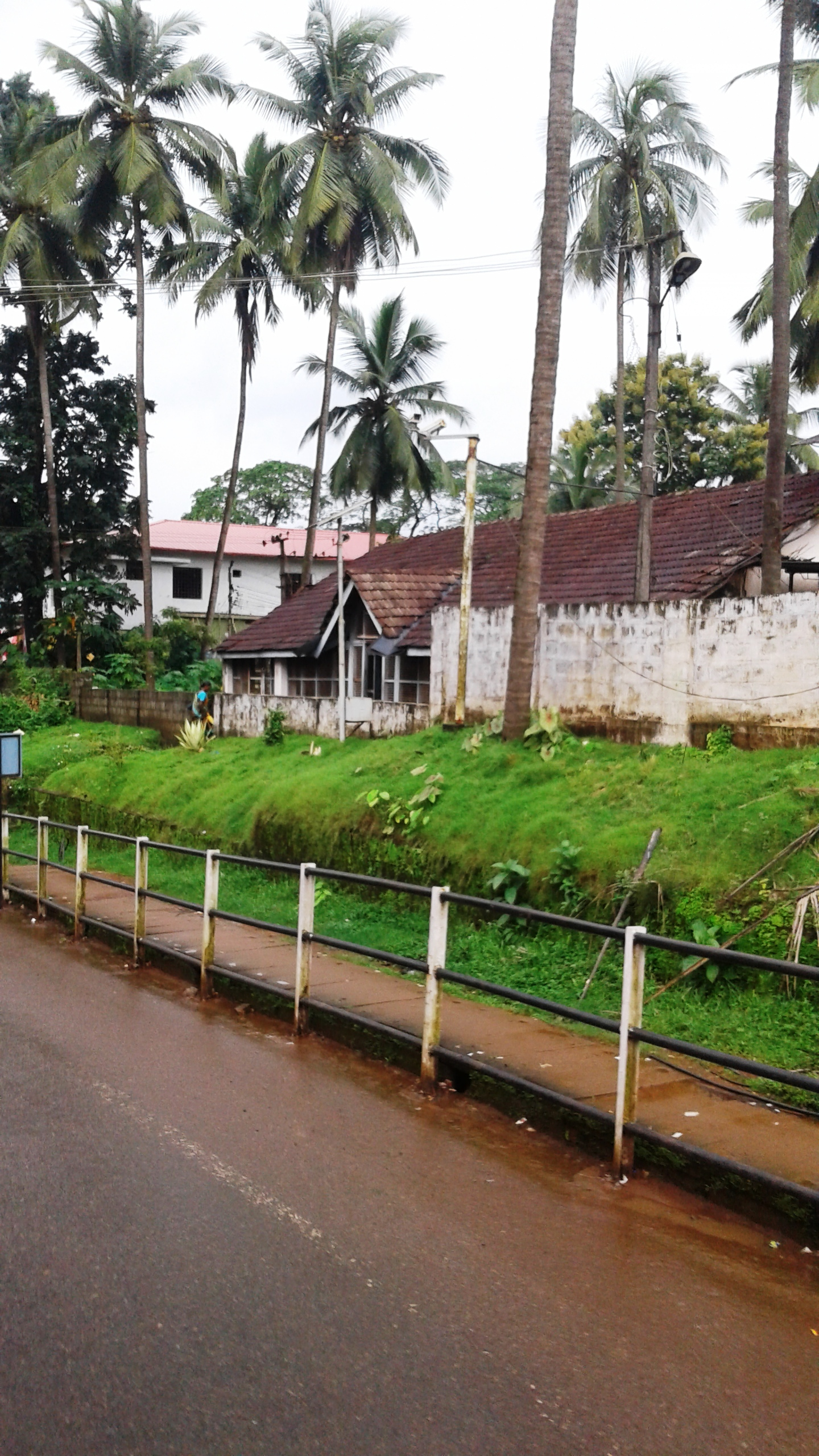
Hilly region – Sullia Town

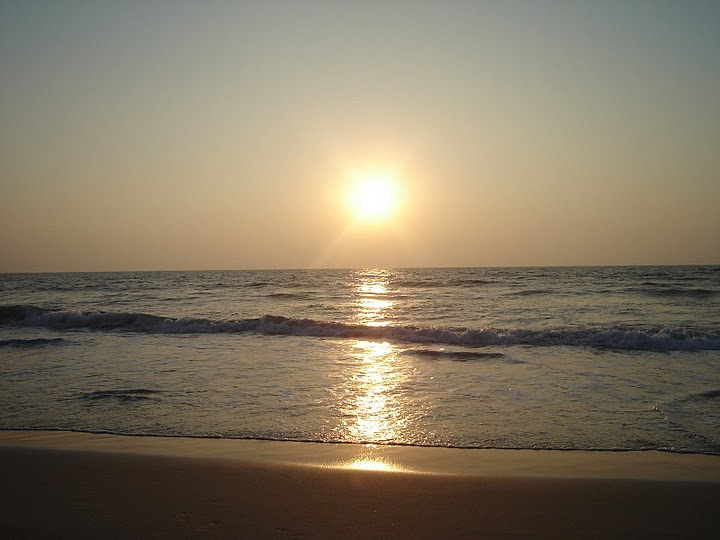
Coastal plain – Tannirbhavi Beach

The district geography consists of seashores in the west and Western Ghats in the east. The soil is mostly lateritic type, characterised by high iron and aluminium content.

The major rivers in the district are Netravathi, Kumaradhara, Gurupura (Phalguni), Shambhavi, Nandini or Pavanje and Payaswini; all flow into the Arabian Sea. At Uppinangadi, the Netravathi and Kumaradhara rivers rise during the monsoon and meet. This event is called "Sangam", which in Sanskrit means confluence. Near Mangaluru, an estuary is formed by the union of the rivers Netravathi and the Gurupura which merge into the Arabian Sea.

The topography of the district is plain up to 30 km (18.64 mi) inside the coast and changes to undulating hilly terrain sharply towards the east in the Western Ghats. Teak, bamboo and rosewood trees are found in the hilly areas towards the east. The Geological Survey of India has identified this district as a moderately earthquake-prone region and categorised it in the Seismic III Zone. In rural Dakshina Kannada, houses are in the midst of a farm field or plantations of coconut or arecanut, separated by a few hundred metres.

Shirlalu village (in the Kudremukh range of Belthangady taluk), with a maximum elevation of 1,115 m (3,658 ft), is the highest point in Dakshina Kannada.

=== Climate ===
Dakshina Kannada features a Tropical Monsoon climate (Am) according to the Köppen climate classification. The average annual rainfall in Dakshina Kannada is 4,030 millimetres (159 in). The rainfall varies from 3,774.1 millimetres (149 in) at the Mangalore coast, 4,530 millimetres (178 in) at Moodabidri and 4,329 millimetres (170 in) at Puttur near the Western Ghats. The average humidity is 75% and peaks in July at 89%.

Climate data for Mangalore (1961–1990, extremes 1901–1981)
Month	Jan	Feb	Mar	Apr	May	Jun	Jul	Aug	Sep	Oct	Nov	Dec	Year
Record high °C (°F)	36.3 (97.3)	37.8 (100.0)	37.4 (99.3)	36.6 (97.9)	36.7 (98.1)	34.4 (93.9)	35.6 (96.1)	32.2 (90.0)	34.6 (94.3)	35.0 (95.0)	35.6 (96.1)	35.6 (96.1)	37.8 (100.0)
Mean daily maximum °C (°F)	31.7 (89.1)	31.7 (89.1)	31.9 (89.4)	32.8 (91.0)	32.3 (90.1)	29.9 (85.8)	28.6 (83.5)	28.5 (83.3)	29.2 (84.6)	30.4 (86.7)	31.7 (89.1)	32.0 (89.6)	30.9 (87.6)
Mean daily minimum °C (°F)	21.7 (71.1)	22.7 (72.9)	24.4 (75.9)	25.7 (78.3)	25.4 (77.7)	23.7 (74.7)	23.1 (73.6)	23.1 (73.6)	23.1 (73.6)	23.4 (74.1)	23.0 (73.4)	22.4 (72.3)	23.5 (74.3)
Record low °C (°F)	16.7 (62.1)	16.7 (62.1)	18.3 (64.9)	20.0 (68.0)	18.9 (66.0)	18.4 (65.1)	18.0 (64.4)	19.8 (67.6)	19.0 (66.2)	18.8 (65.8)	17.6 (63.7)	16.7 (62.1)	16.7 (62.1)
Average rainfall mm (inches)	0.2 (0.01)	3.6 (0.14)	2.5 (0.10)	35.0 (1.38)	199.5 (7.85)	955.8 (37.63)	1,160.3 (45.68)	792.6 (31.20)	331.5 (13.05)	184.0 (7.24)	75.2 (2.96)	33.9 (1.33)	3,774.1 (148.59)
Average rainy days	0.0	0.0	0.1	2.0	7.2	24.5	29.4	25.4	15.3	10.1	4.4	1.3	119.7
Average relative humidity (%) (at 17:30 IST)	65	68	70	71	73	82	86	85	83	80	71	67	75
Source: India Meteorological Department

Climate data for Puttur, Karnataka, India
Month	Jan	Feb	Mar	Apr	May	Jun	Jul	Aug	Sep	Oct	Nov	Dec	Year
Mean daily maximum °C (°F)	31.3 (88.3)	31.8 (89.2)	32.7 (90.9)	33.1 (91.6)	32.4 (90.3)	29.3 (84.7)	28.0 (82.4)	28.2 (82.8)	28.8 (83.8)	29.9 (85.8)	30.8 (87.4)	31.2 (88.2)	30.6 (87.1)
Mean daily minimum °C (°F)	20.8 (69.4)	22.0 (71.6)	23.6 (74.5)	25.2 (77.4)	25.2 (77.4)	23.5 (74.3)	23.0 (73.4)	23.1 (73.6)	23.0 (73.4)	23.2 (73.8)	22.4 (72.3)	21.0 (69.8)	23.0 (73.4)
Average rainfall mm (inches)	0 (0)	1 (0.0)	6 (0.2)	63 (2.5)	208 (8.2)	938 (36.9)	1,489 (58.6)	858 (33.8)	386 (15.2)	277 (10.9)	81 (3.2)	22 (0.9)	4,329 (170.4)
Source: Climate-Data.org – Climate Table of Puttur, Karnataka, India

== Administration ==
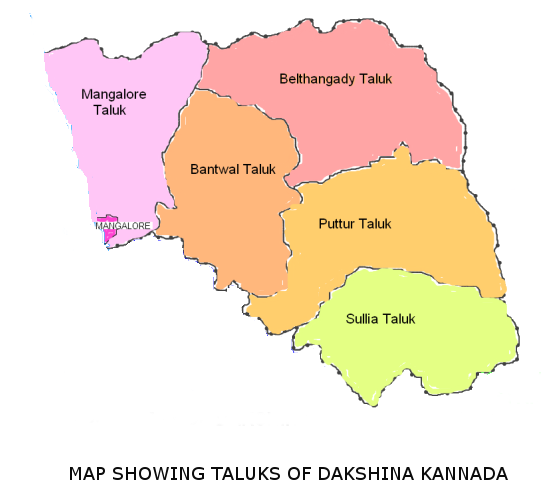
Map showing the taluks of Dakshina Kannada District

The district comprises nine talukas: Mangaluru, Puttur, Sullia, Bantwal, Belthangady, Kadaba, Ullala, Mulki and Moodabidri. It used to include seven northern talukas (Udupi, Kundapur, Karkala, Hebri, Brahmavar, Kaup and Byndoor), but these were separated in August 1997 to form Udupi district. The office where taluk administration is hosted is called "Taluk Kacheri". The Taluk (Taluka or Tehsil) are further divided into Hobli's. Mangaluru, Surathkal, Gurupura and Mulki are Hobli's under Mangaluru taluk. Panemamangalore, Vitla and Bantval are under Bantwal taluk. Puttur and Uppinangady are under Puttur taluk. Belthangadi, Kokkada and Venoor are under Belthangady taluk. Sulya and Panja Hobli's are under Sullia taluk. The newly formed taluks of Moodabidri, Ullala and Kadaba have one Hobli each. The office in which Hoblis function is called "Nada Kacheri". The district has 2 revenue subdivisions, namely Mangaluru and Puttur. Mangaluru subdivision has 5 taluks and Puttur subdivision has 4 taluks.

Important cities and towns in Dakshina Kannada include Mangaluru, Surathkal, Puttur, Sullia, Bantwal, Vittal, Moodabidri, Shirthady, Kinnigoli, Uppinangady, Nellyadi, Kadaba, Belthangady, Guruvayankere, Venur, Mulki, Dharmasthala, Ujire and Subramanya. The district is well known for beaches, red clay roof tiles (Mangalore tiles), cashew nut and its products, banking, education, healthcare and cuisine. Mangalore being the second largest city of Karnataka and Puttur are the largest and the major cities of Dakshina Kannada.

Dakshina Kannada District has 1 City Corporation (Mangaluru), 2 City Municipal Councils, 3 Town Municipal Councils, and 8 Town Panchayaths.

=== Cities ===
- Mangaluru
- Puttur
- Ullala
- Bantwal
- Moodabidri
- Someshwara
- Belthangady
- Sullia
- Kadaba
- Mulki
- Vittal
- Kotekar
- Bajpe
- Kinnigoli

=== Talukas ===
- Kudla/ Mangalore
- Bantwala / Bantwal
- Puttur
- Sullia
- Bolther/ Belthangady
- Kadaba
- Ullala
- Mulki
- Bedra/ Moodabidri

=== Villages ===
- Aramboor
- Bandaru
- Belthangady
- Dharmasthala
- Elikkala
- Kakkinje
- Kudipady
- Moodabidri
- Punjalkatte
- Shamboor
- Thokur-62

== Demographics ==
Historical population
Year	Pop.	±% p.a.
1901	485,304	—
1911	516,051	+0.62%
1921	546,146	+0.57%
1931	596,400	+0.88%
1941	666,222	+1.11%
1951	755,100	+1.26%
1961	915,039	+1.94%
1971	1,163,668	+2.43%
1981	1,428,028	+2.07%
1991	1,656,165	+1.49%
2001	1,897,730	+1.37%
2011	2,089,649	+0.97%

According to the 2011 census, Dakshina Kannada has a population of 2,089,649, of which male and female were 1,034,714 and 1,054,935 respectively. roughly equal to the nation of North Macedonia. This gives it a ranking of 220th in India (out of a total of 640). The district has a population density of 457 inhabitants per square kilometre (1,180/sq mi). Its population growth rate over the decade 2001–2011 was 9.8%. Dakshina Kannada has a sex ratio of 1018 females for every 1000 males and a literacy rate of 88.62%. 47.67% of the population lived in urban areas. Scheduled Castes and Scheduled Tribes make up 7.09% and 3.94% of the population respectively.

The literacy rate of Mangaluru city is 94%. According to the 2011 Indian Census, the district ranks second in per capita income, second in HDI, first in literacy and third in sex ratio among all districts in Karnataka.

Tuluvas, distributed among the Billava, Mogaveera, Bunt, Kulala, Tulu Gowda and Devadiga communities, are the largest ethnic group in the district. Of these the Billavas are the most numerous community. The Konkani people, Brahmins, Holeyas, the hill-tribes (Koragas), Muslims, Mangalorean Catholics and Arebhashe Gowdas comprise rest of the population. The Brahmins belong chiefly to the Havyaka, Shivalli, Saraswat, Chitpavan, Daivadnya and Kota sub-sections.

=== Religion and caste ===
Religions in Dakshina Kannada (2011)
Religion	Percent
Hinduism	67.18%
Islam	24.02%
Christianity	8.20%
Jainism	0.50%
Other or not stated	0.10%

In Dakshina Kannada, Hindus form the majority, while Muslims and Christians form significant minorities. Muslims and Christians have greater presence in urban areas. The Beary community forms 90% of Dakshina Kannada's Muslim population. The Masjid Zeenath Baksh, the oldest mosque in the region, was built in 644 CE, only 12 years after the death of The Holy Messenger Hazrat Syedna Muhammad ﷺ . Almost all Muslims in Dakshina Kannada are Sunni, following the Shafi'i school of jurisprudence. The majority of Christians in the district are Catholics, now called the Mangalorean Catholics. They trace their ancestry to Goa. A minority are Protestants, its followers were converted by missionaries in the late 1800s who established numerous educational institutions.

Historically Jainism and Buddhism had a significant presence in the district. Jainism was the traditional religion of the Alupas as well as the Chowtas. The Chowtas ruled Dakshina Kannada during the Portuguese invasions of the 1500s.

The caste composition of region in total population is estimated as 18% Billava, 12–14% Bunts, 11% SC - ST, 3–4% Mogaveera, 2% Gaud Saraswat Brahmins and other castes comprises the remaining 18–20 % of the population.

=== Language ===
Languages of Dakshina Kannada (2011)
1. Tulu (48.6%)
2. Beary (16.1%)
3. Malayalam (9.97%)
4. Konkani (9.91%)
5. Kannada (9.27%)
6. Marathi (1.72%)
7. Urdu (1.58%)
8. Tamil (1.13%)
9. Hindi (0.91%)
10. Others (0.81%)

Tulu is the major language of the district and is spoken by 48.6% of the population. It is the oldest language of the district and has a long literary tradition. Tulu has several dialects and sociolects including a Northern dialect near Udupi and Southern dialect centred on Mangalore. It is the majority language in Bantwal, Beltangadi and Puttur taluks. Many have demanded the language's inclusion in the Eighth Schedule of the Constitution. Beary is the next largest speech variety, spoken by 16% of the population, and is spoken by the Muslim community who were traditionally traders. Although linguistically classified as a variety of Malayalam, it has undergone significant influence from Tulu as well as Arabic, Persian and the languages of other foreign traders. It is not recognized as a language in the census and included under others category. Malayalam is spoken by approximately 10% of the population mainly by Mappila Muslims, Maniyani (Yadava) and Vaniya community in the regions bordering Kerala. Konkani is spoken by 9.9% of the population. The dialect of Konkani here has strong influence from Tulu and Kannada. Kannada, even though the official language of the state, is only spoken by 9.3% of the population here. There are many dialects of Kannada spoken, some of which are Are Bhashe, spoken by Gowdas, and Havigannada or Havyaka, spoken by the Havyaka Brahmin community. Deccani Urdu is spoken by 1.6% mainly seen in Mangalore city and Moodabidri. Hindi, Marathi and Tamil are also spoken by very small minorities. Koraga is an indigenous tribal language still spoken by some individuals in the district.

== Education and research ==
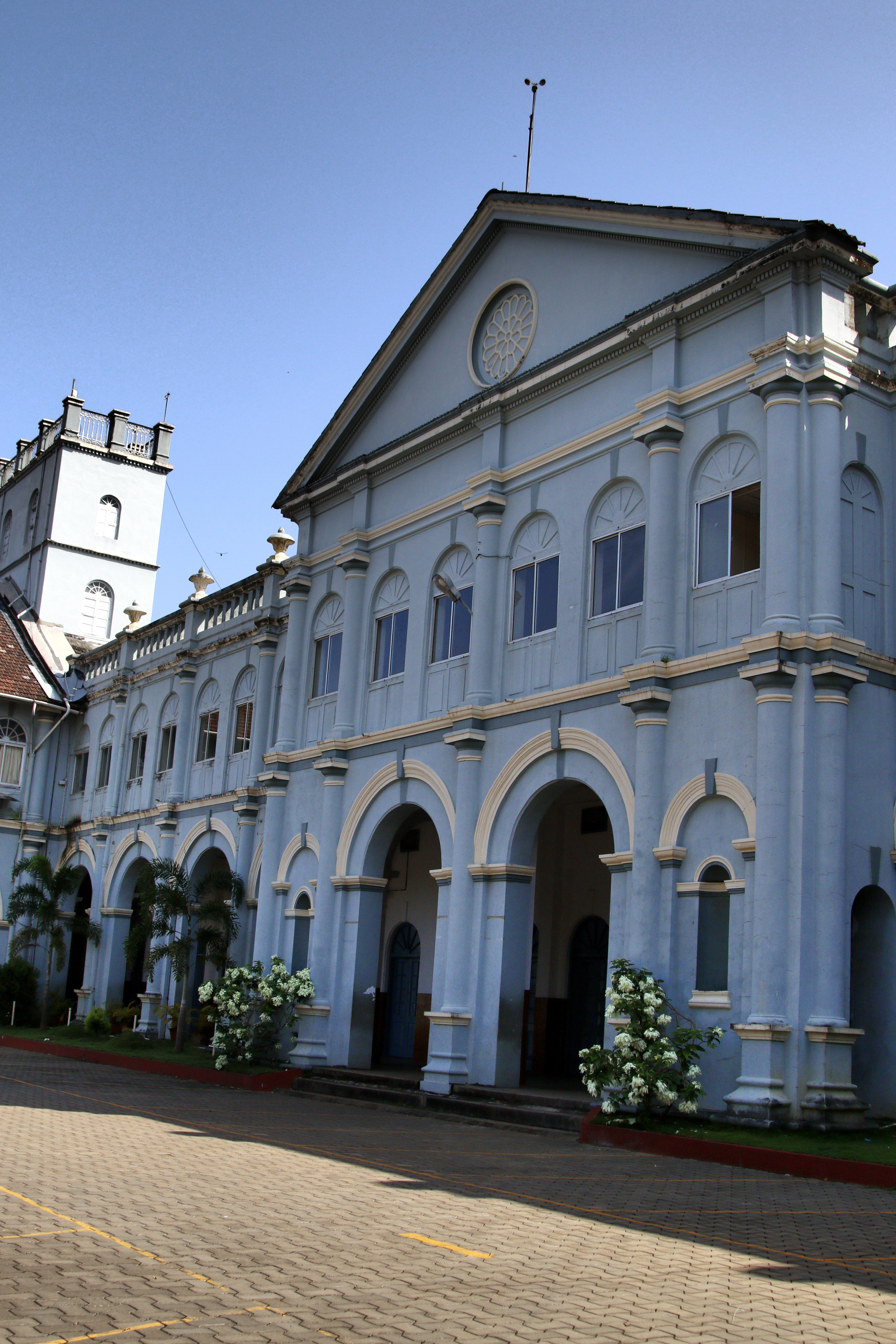
St Aloysius College, Mangalore

In Dakshina Kannada, primary and secondary education have reached every section of the society. Some of them are St Agnes CBSE school, St Theresa ICSE School and St Aloysius School, Vivekananda college, A host of educational institutes offering courses in Medicine, Engineering, Pharmacy, Nursing, Hotel and Catering, Law and Management are in this district.

Dakshina Kannada is home to the National Institute of Technology Karnataka (NITK) Surathkal, one of India's top engineering colleges. The College of Fisheries is located at Yekkur near Kankanady. Mangalore University is a public university in Konaje near Mangaluru. It has jurisdiction over the districts of Dakshina Kannada, Udupi and Kodagu.

The district is home to research institutes such as the Directorate of Cashew Research at Puttur. The Central Plantation Crops Research Institute is in Vitla in the Bantwal taluk.

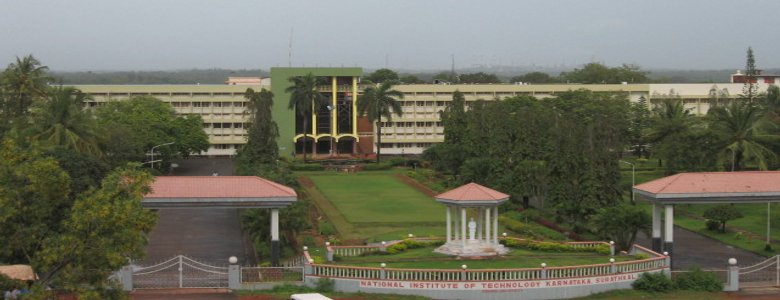
NITK Surathkal

The engineering colleges in the district include St. Joseph Engineering College, KVG College of Engineering, Mangalore Institute of Technology & Engineering, Canara Engineering College, P A College of Engineering, Srinivas Institute of Technology, Srinivas School of Engineering, Vivekananda College of Engineering & Technology, Shree Devi Institute of Technology, Alvas Institute of Engineering & Technology, Karavali Institute of Technology, Sahyadri College of Engineering and Management, Yenepoya Institute of Technology, A J Institute of Engineering and Technology, SDM Institute of Technology, Bearys Institute of Technology and Prasanna College of Engineering & Technology.

The medical colleges in the district include A J Institute of Medical Science, Father Muller Medical College, KS Hegde Medical Academy, Kasturba Medical College, Srinivas Institute of Medical Sciences and Research Centre, Yenepoya Medical College & Research Institute, G R Medical College and KVG Medical College. Manipal College of Dental Sciences Mangalore, A B Shetty Memorial Institute of Dental Sciences, A J Institute of Dental Sciences, Yenepoya Dental College & Research Institute and Srinivas Institute of Dental Sciences are some of the dental colleges. The District is also home to Edward & Cynthia Institute of Public Health, which is the only specialized institute for public health academics, training and research in the district.

The Degree colleges in the district include St Aloysius (Deemed University), St Agnes College (Autonomous), SDM College, Canara College, Besant College, Govinda Dasa College etc.

== Culture ==
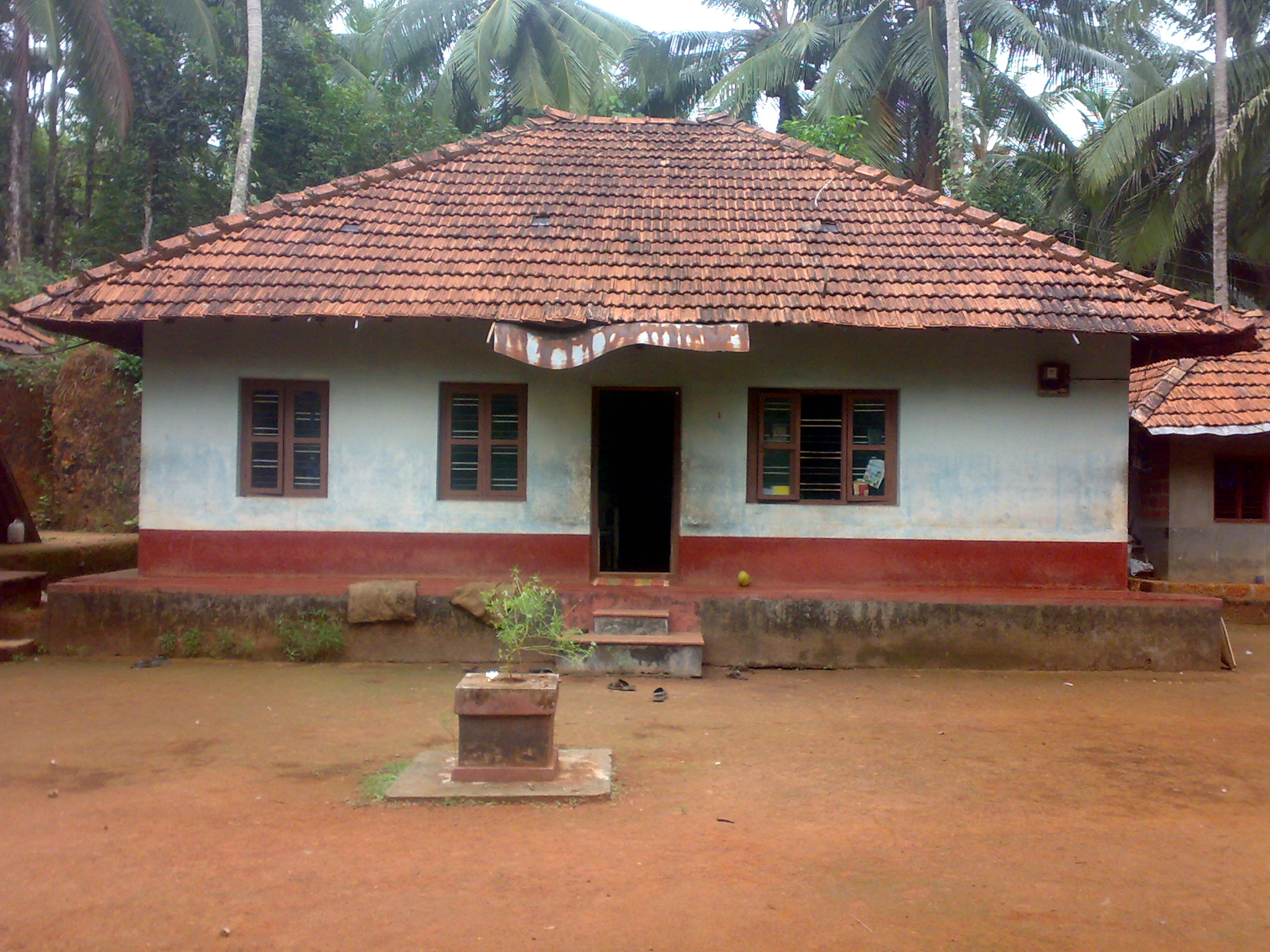
Traditional house in Puttur

Most people of this district follow traditional traditions, customs and rituals. The district has many temples of Hindu gods and goddesses, which are ancient and have deep spiritualism attached to them. The people of Dakshina Kannada worship the Serpent God Subramanya. According to legend, the district was reclaimed by Parashurama from the sea. According to the 17th-century Malayalam work Keralolpathi, the lands of Kerala and Tulu Nadu were recovered from the sea by the axe-wielding warrior sage Parasurama, the sixth avatar of Vishnu (hence, Kerala is also called Parasurama Kshetram 'The Land of Parasurama'). Parasurama threw his axe across the sea, and the water receded as far as it reached.

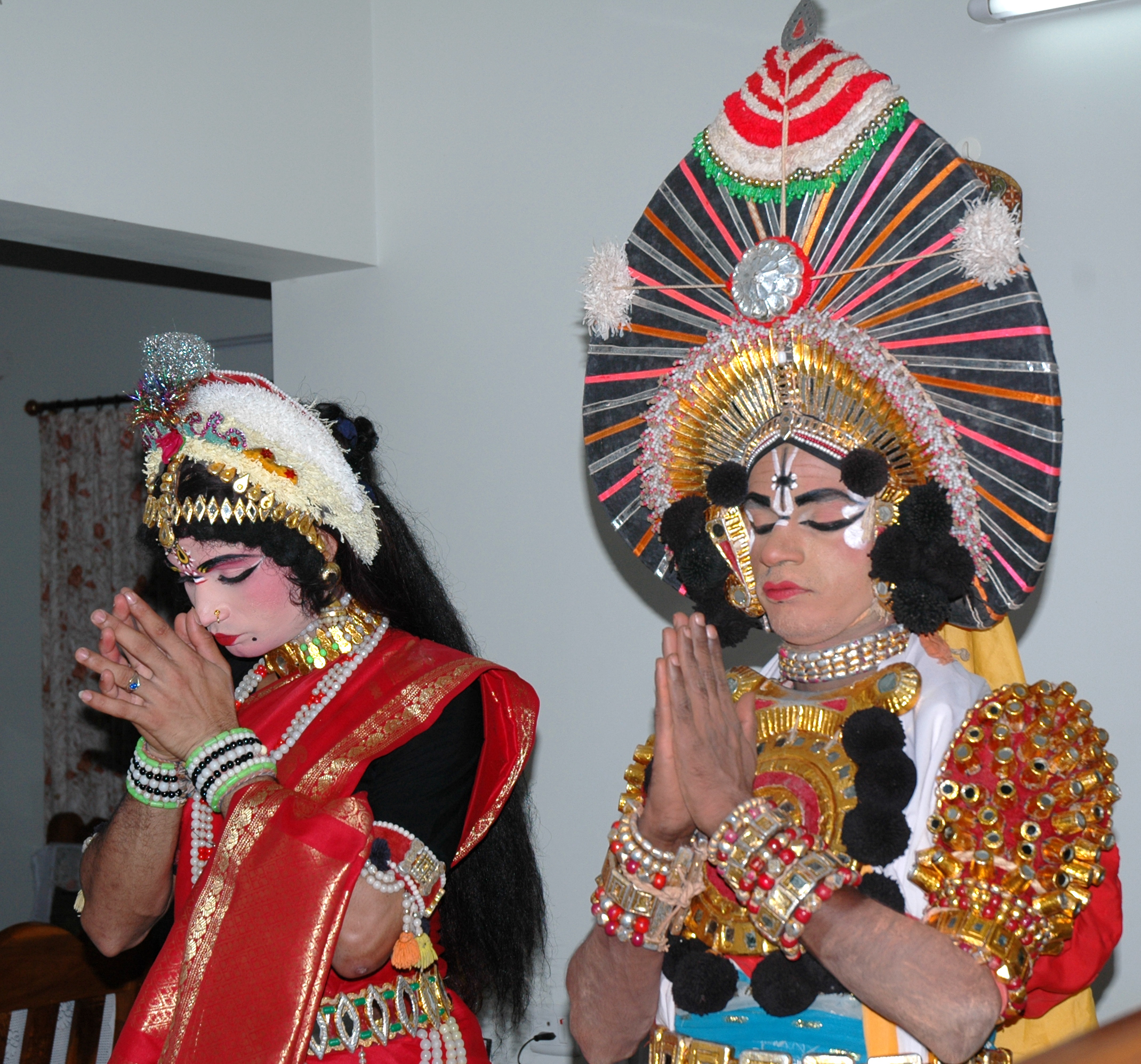
Yakshagana artists

According to legend, this new area of land extended from Gokarna to Kanyakumari. The land which rose from sea was filled with salt and unsuitable for habitation; so Parasurama invoked the Snake King Vasuki, who spat holy poison and converted the soil into fertile lush green land. Out of respect, Vasuki and all snakes were appointed as protectors and guardians of the land. P. T. Srinivasa Iyengar theorised, that Senguttuvan may have been inspired by the Parasurama legend, which was brought by early Aryan settlers. Nagaradhane or snake worship is practiced according to the popular belief of the Naga Devatha to go underground and guard the species on the top. Rituals such as Bhuta Kola are performed to satisfy the spirits. Kambala, a form of buffalo race on muddy track in the paddy field is organised in 16 sites across the district. Cock fight (Kori Katta in Tulu) is another pastime of the rural agrarian people.

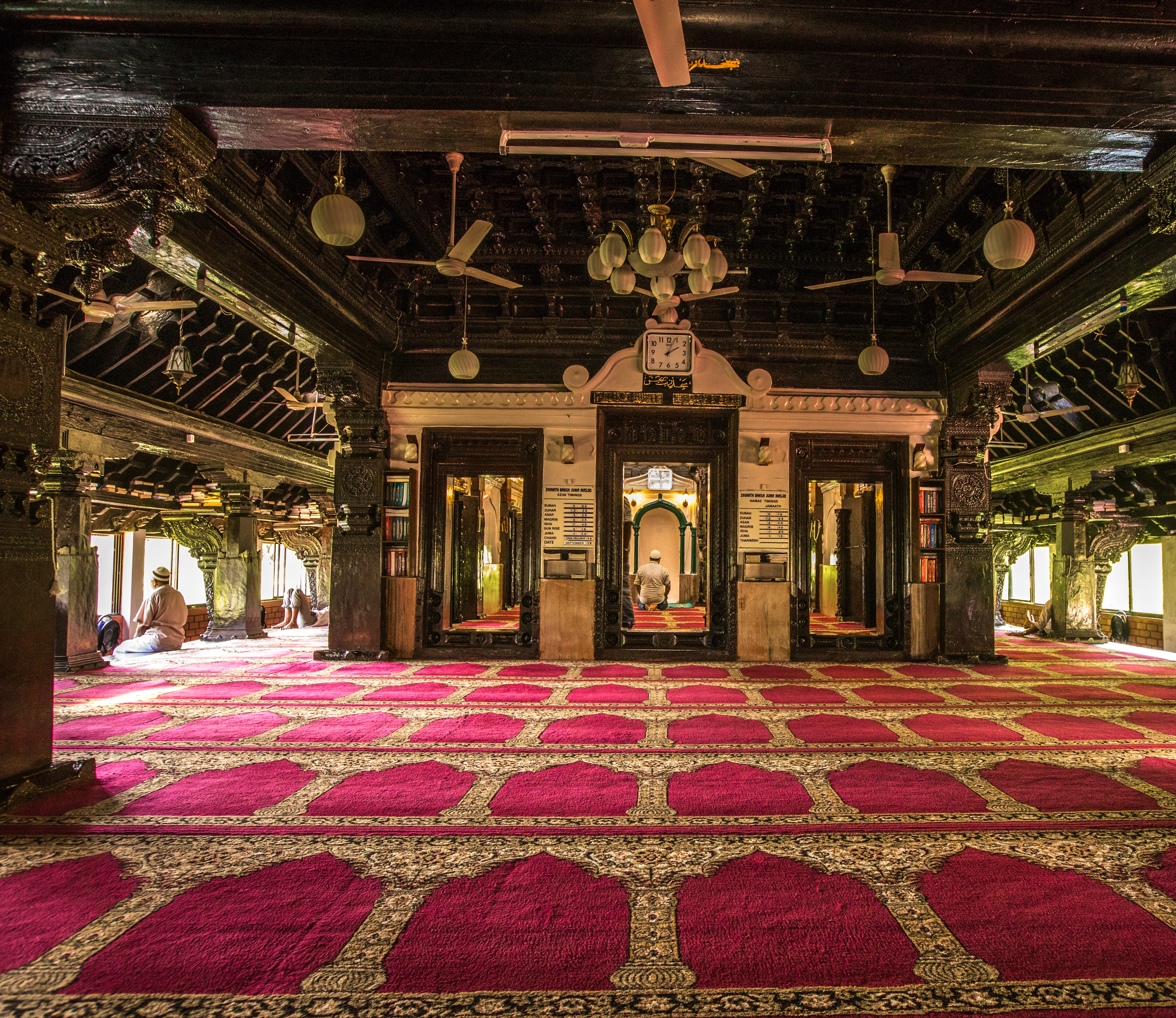
Masjid Zeenath Baksh is one of the oldest Masjids in the Indian subcontinent built around 644 AD

Yakshagana is the popular folk art of this district. The Yakshagana is a night-long dance and drama performance practiced in Tulu Nadu with great fanfare. Pilivesha (literally, tiger dance) is a unique form of folk dance in the region fascinating the young and the old alike, which is performed during Dasara and Krishna Janmashtami. Karadi Vesha (literally, bear dance) is another popular dance performed during Dasara. The people of Dakshina Kannada also celebrate traditional Hindu festivals like Bisu, Yugadi (Ugadi), Krishna Janmashtami, Ganesha Chaturthi, Navaratri (Dasara), Deepavali, Aati Hunime, etc.

According to Kerala Muslim tradition, the Masjid Zeenath Baksh at Mangaluru is one of the oldest mosques in the Indian subcontinent. According to the Legend of Cheraman Perumals, the first Indian mosque was built in 624 AD at Kodungallur with the mandate of the last the ruler (the Cheraman Perumal) of Chera dynasty, who left from Dharmadom to Mecca and converted to Islam during the lifetime of Muhammad (c. 570–632). According to Qissat Shakarwati Farmad, the Masjids at Kodungallur, Kollam, Madayi, Barkur, Mangaluru, Kasaragod, Kannur, Dharmadam, Panthalayani (Koyilandy), and Chaliyam, were built during the era of Malik Dinar, and they are among the oldest Masjids in the Indian subcontinent. It is believed that Malik Dinar died at Thalangara in Kasaragod town. Two of them, Mangalore and Barkur lie in Tulu Nadu.

The 16th century work Tuhfat Ul Mujahideen written by Zainuddin Makhdoom II appears to be the first historical work written in detail about the contemporary history of Mangalore. It is written in Arabic and contains pieces of information about the resistance put up by the navy of Kunjali Marakkar alongside the Zamorin of Calicut from 1498 to 1583 against Portuguese attempts to colonize Tulu Nadu and Malabar coast.

=== Cuisine ===
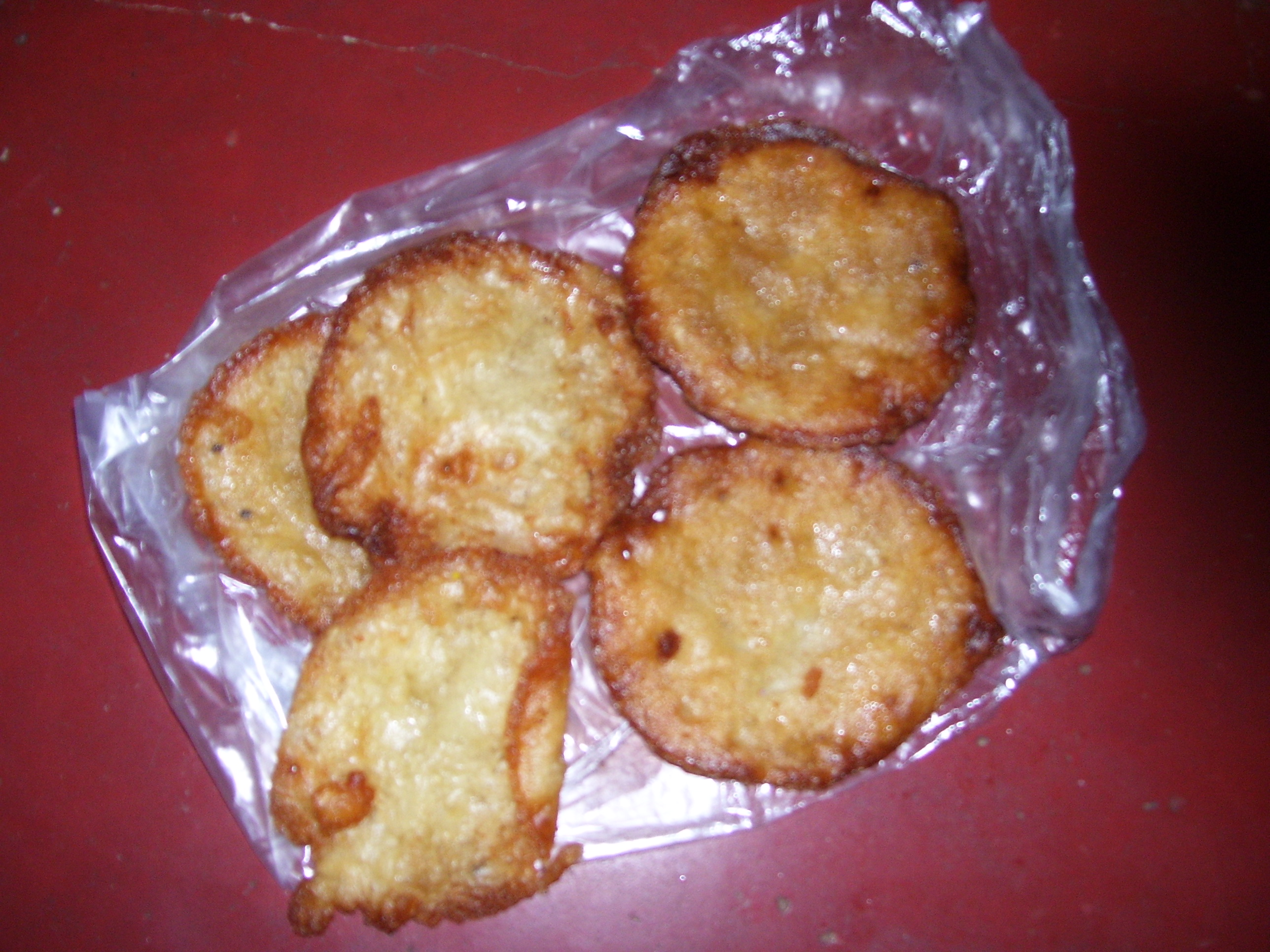
Malpuri, a sweet from Dakshina Kannada

Some of the well-known Tuluva community dishes in this district include Kori Rotti (dry rice flakes dipped in chicken gravy), Bangude Pulimunchi (spicy sour silver-grey mackerels), Beeja-Manoli Upkari, Neer dosa, Boothai Gasi and Kadubu. In Coastal Karnataka, the Mangalorean Fish Curry is a popular dish. The Konkani community's specialties include Daali thoy, Bibbe-upkari (cashew based), Val val, Avnas ambe sasam, Kadgi chakko, Paagila podi, Malpuri, Patrode and Chane gashi. Mangalore bajji, also known as Golibaje, is a popular snack made from maida, curd, rice flour, chopped onion, coriander leaves, coconut, cumin, green chillies, and salt. Tulu vegetarian cuisine in Mangalore, also known as Udupi cuisine, is known and liked throughout the state and the coastal region. Being a coastal district, fish forms the staple diet of most people.

The Beary community have their own unique dishes. Pattir, Pole, Pulchepole, Kalthappa, Aapa, Neyyappa, Neypathir, Irmandappa, Pindi, Erchi pindi, Kunji pindi, and Vodupole are some of the traditional breakfasts and are primarily made from rice. Various dishes made from fresh or dried fish are also extensively consumed. Molavtanni made from lentils or sprouted pulses is the traditional soup usually eaten along with rice. Kakka is the traditional gravy made from fish, chicken, egg or mutton. Like in other coastal cuisine, coconut and its products form integral part of the Beary cuisine.

Mangalorean Catholics' Sanna-Dukra Maas ("Sanna" means Idli fluffed with toddy or yeast and "Dukra Maas" means Pork) Pork Bafat and Sorpotel . Pickles such as Happala, Sandige and Puli munchi are unique to Mangaluru.

== Transport ==
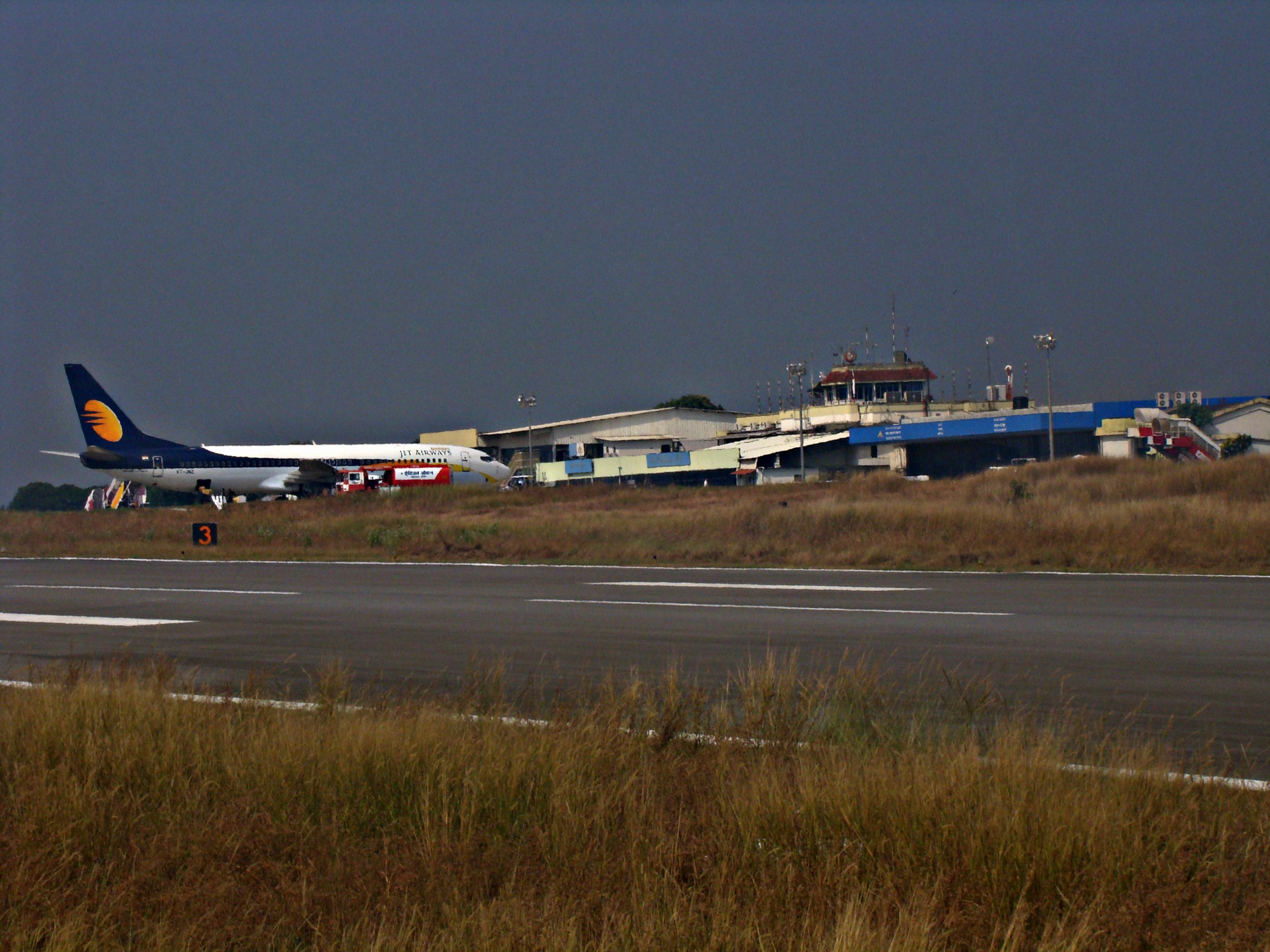
Jet Airways at the Mangalore International Airport

The district is connected by air through the Mangalore International Airport at Bajpe. Airlines such as Air India, SpiceJet and IndiGo offer daily flights to national and international destinations near the Persian Gulf.

Bus services in this district are run by private players namely Dakshina Kannada Bus Operators' Association (DKBOA) and the state-run KSRTC. The district had public limited (public listed) companies running transport business even before the independence of India in 1947.

The district has five national highways connecting parts of Karnataka and India. NH-66 connects the district with Udupi, Karwar, Mumbai, Goa, Kannur, Kozhikode, Kochi and Thiruvananthapuram. NH-169 connects Shimoga with Dakshina Kannada. NH-75 connects the district with Vellore, Kolar, Bengaluru, Kunigal, Hassan and Sakleshpur. The NH-73 connects Mangalore to Tumkur via Charmadi, Mudigere, Belur and Tiptur. Major ghat sections in Dakshina Kannada include Shiradi Ghat (Nelyadi to Sakleshpura), Charmadi Ghat (Charmadi to Kottigehara), Sampaje Ghat (Sampaje to Madikeri) and Bisle Ghat (Subramanya to Sakleshpura, popularly known as Green Route by trekkers). NH-275 also connects Mangalore with Bengaluru via Mysore. It starts at Bantwal near Mangalore city and passes through Puttur, Madikeri, Hunsur, Mysore, Mandya and Channapatna. It ends at Bengaluru spanning a length of 378 kilometres (235 mi).

Highways passing through Dakshina Kannada
Highway	Starting Point	Ending Point
National Highway 66 (previously NH 17)	Panvel, Maharashtra	Kanyakumari, Tamil Nadu
National Highway 75 (previously NH 48)	Mangaluru	Vellore, Tamil Nadu
National Highway 275	Mangaluru	Bengaluru
National Highway 169 (previously NH 13)	Mangaluru	Shimoga
National Highway 73	Mangaluru	Tumkur

In 1907, the Southern Railway connected Mangalore with Calicut (Kozhikode) along the coastline. This railway line helped connect the district with other places of the Madras presidency during the colonial rule. The Konkan Railway (1998) connects Dakshina Kannada with Maharashtra, Goa, Gujarat, Delhi, Rajasthan and Kerala by train. There are direct trains from Mangaluru to Mumbai, Thane, Chennai, Margao and Thiruvananthapuram. Train services operate daily to Bengaluru via Hassan and Kukke Subramanya after the conversion from metre gauge to broad gauge track. Mangaluru Central (MAQ), Mangaluru Junction(MAJN), Surathkal railway station(SL), Subrahmanya Road railway station are few prominent railway stations in the district of Dakshina Kannada (South Kanara).

The Dakshina Kannada district has a seaport at Panambur named New Mangalore Port. The seaport managed by New Mangalore Port Trust handles cargo, timber, petroleum and coffee exports. It is one of the major seaports of India.

== Historic sites ==
The following are historic places to visit in Dakshina Kannada:

- Mangaladevi Temple: Mangalore was named after the Hindu deity Mangaladevi.
- Venur: Monolithic Bahubali statue.
- Kadri: Temple of Lord Sri Manjunatha.
- Moodabidri: Site of the ancient Jain temples and the Bhattaraka seat.
- Krishnapura matha: One of the matha (monastery) belonging to ashta matha of Udupi.
- Dharmasthala Temple
- Karinjeshwara Temple: Temple of Shiva Parvati on a rock.
- Kukke Subramanya: Temple of the serpent Lord Subramanya is here.
- Mulki: Durgaparameshwari Temple.
- St Aloysius Chapel, Mangaluru.
- Milagres Church, Mangaluru
- Sultan Battery, Mangaluru
- Sri Mahalingeshwara Temple, Puttur
- Uppinangadi: Sahasralingeshwara temple.
- Pilikula Nisargadhama: Pilikula, Moodushedde, Mangaluru.
- Shri Rajarajeshwari Temple Polali: Temple of Shri Rajarajeshwari.
- Srimanthi Bhai Memorial Government Museum
- Sawthadka Shri Mahaganapathi Temple

=== Nearby hill stations ===
Some of the hill stations in close proximity to this district corresponding to their elevation above sea level are Kudremukh peak 1,894 m (6,214 ft), Pushpagiri 1,712 m (5,617 ft), Madikeri 1,150 m (3,770 ft), Mudigere 970 m (3,180 ft) and Sakleshpur 956 m (3,136 ft).

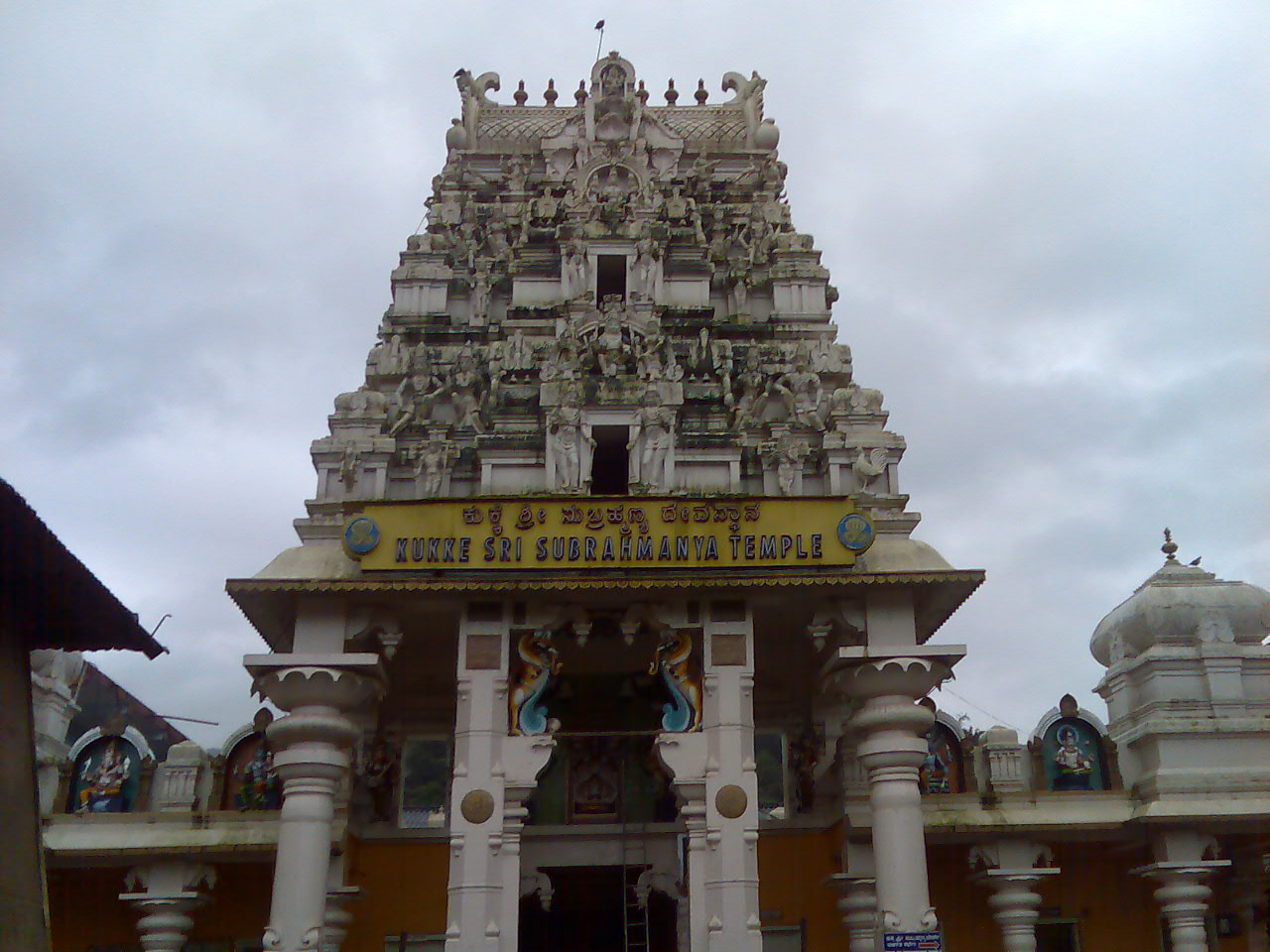
Kukke Subramanya Temple

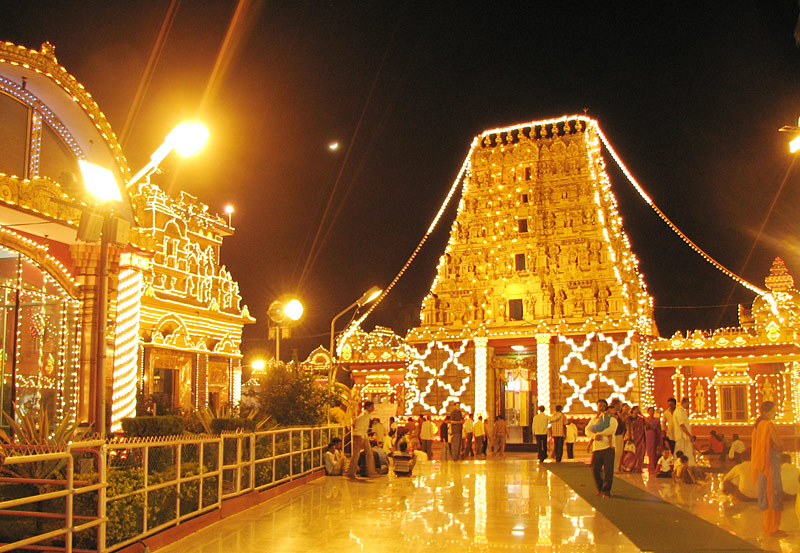
Kudroli Temple in Mangaluru

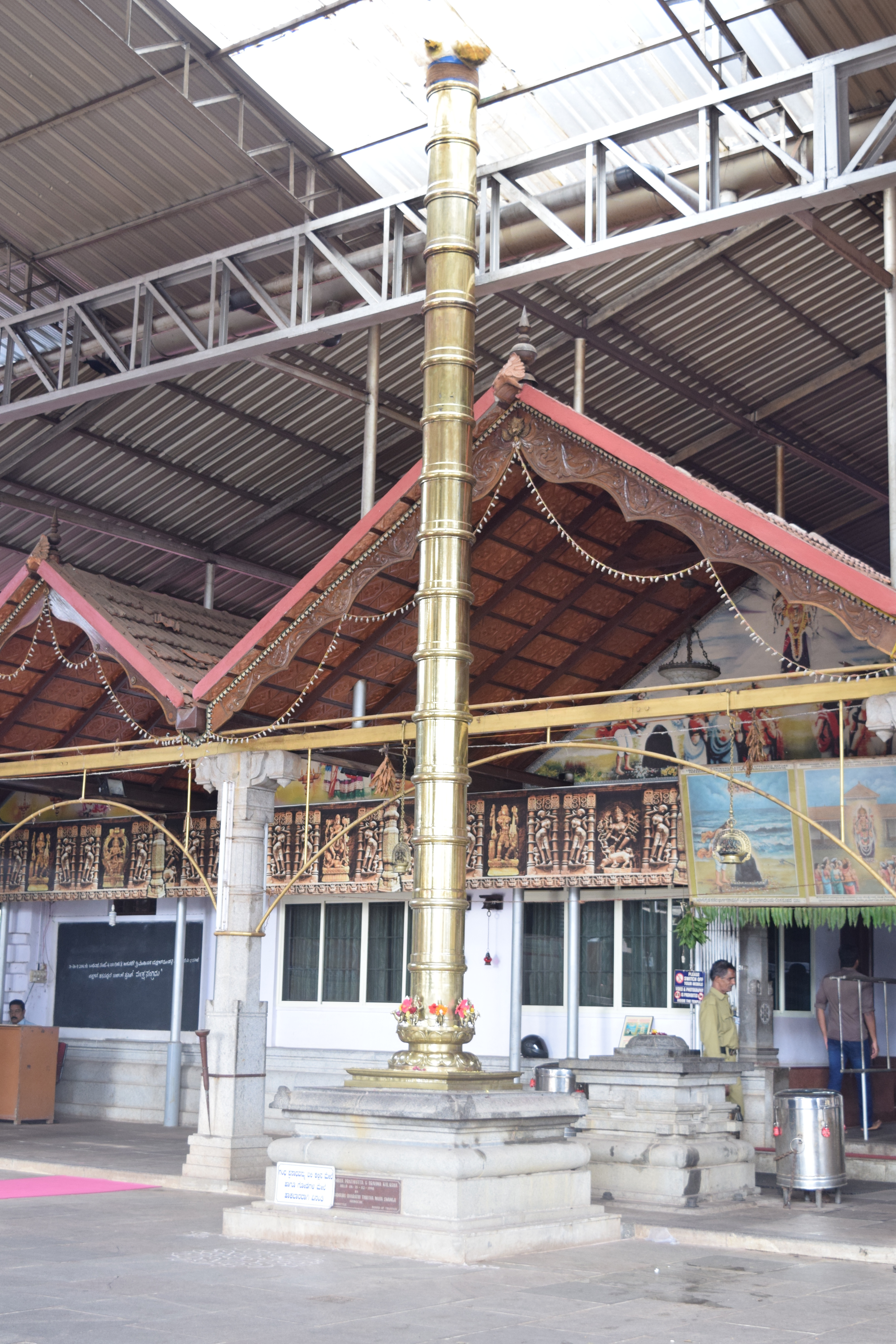
Mangaladevi Temple

== Economy ==
=== Agriculture ===
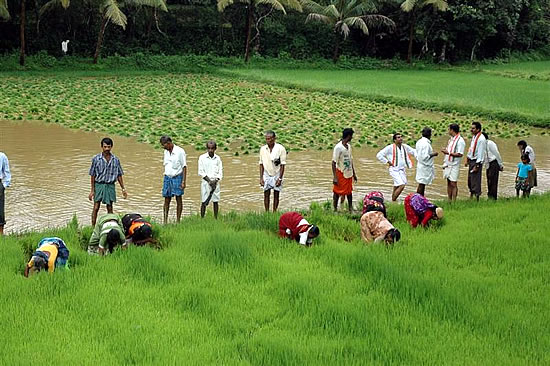
Paddy cultivation in Dakshina Kannada

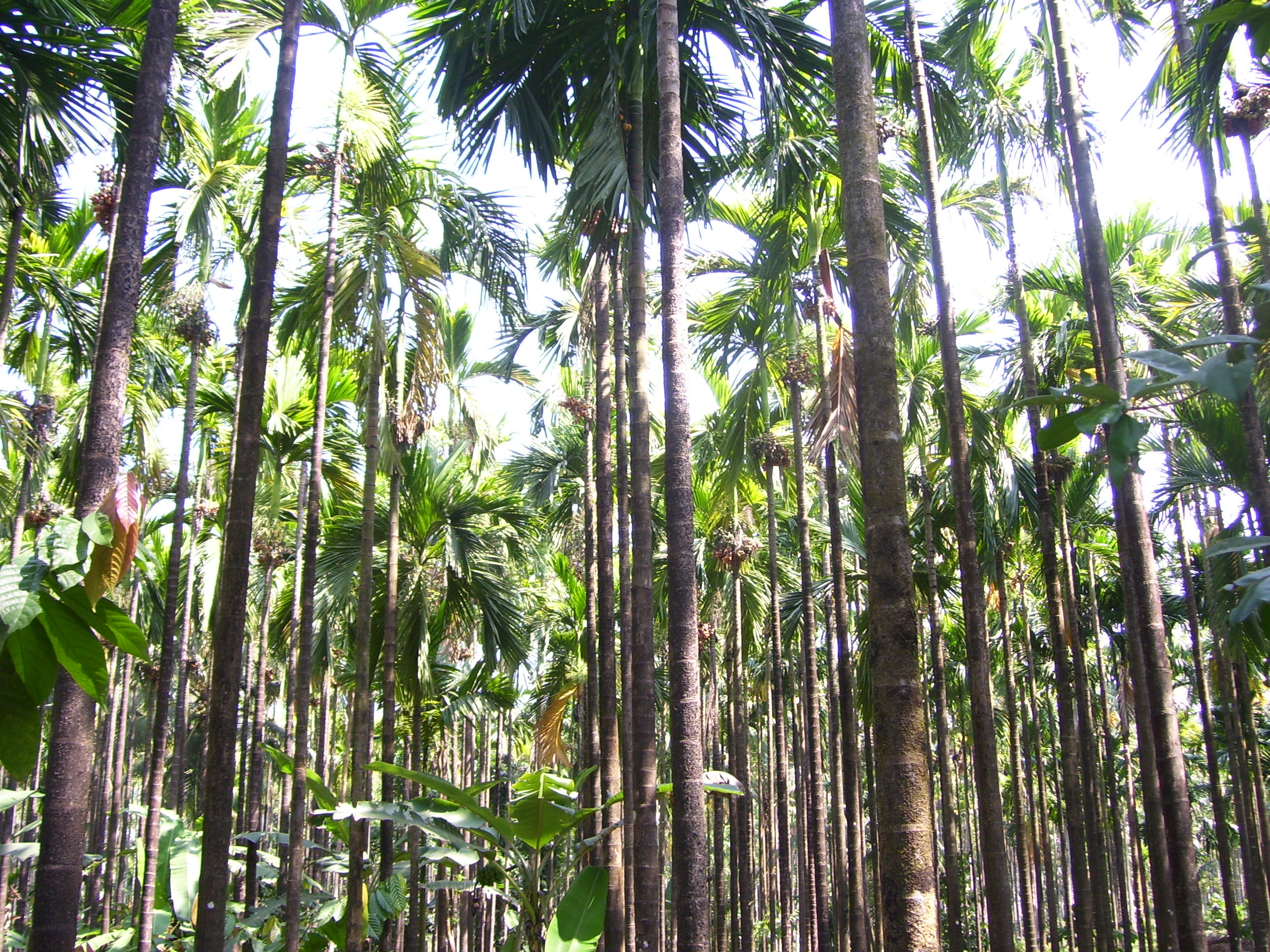
Arecanut plantation of rural Dakshina Kannada

Agriculture, which was once a major occupation of the people of Dakshina Kannada, has taken a backseat because of the influx of money from natives settled in other cities, states and countries. Significant number of people from this district work in the Gulf (Middle East) countries and other states of India. Farms and fields have been converted into residential plots and commercial (shopping) complexes around Mangalore city. Horticulture, though, has made some strides, and measures have been taken to improve the fruit plantation sector. The main crops of Dakshina Kannada are Paddy, Coconut, Arecanut, Black Pepper, Cashew and Cocoa. Rice is generally cultivated three seasons in a year, Karthika or Yenel (May–October), Suggi (October to January) and Kolake (January to April). Urad (Black gram) is grown in some areas during the season of Suggi. The Karnataka Milk Federation has a milk processing plant at Kulshekar in Mangaluru. This plant processes milk procured from the cattle owned by farmers of the district.

=== Commerce and industry ===
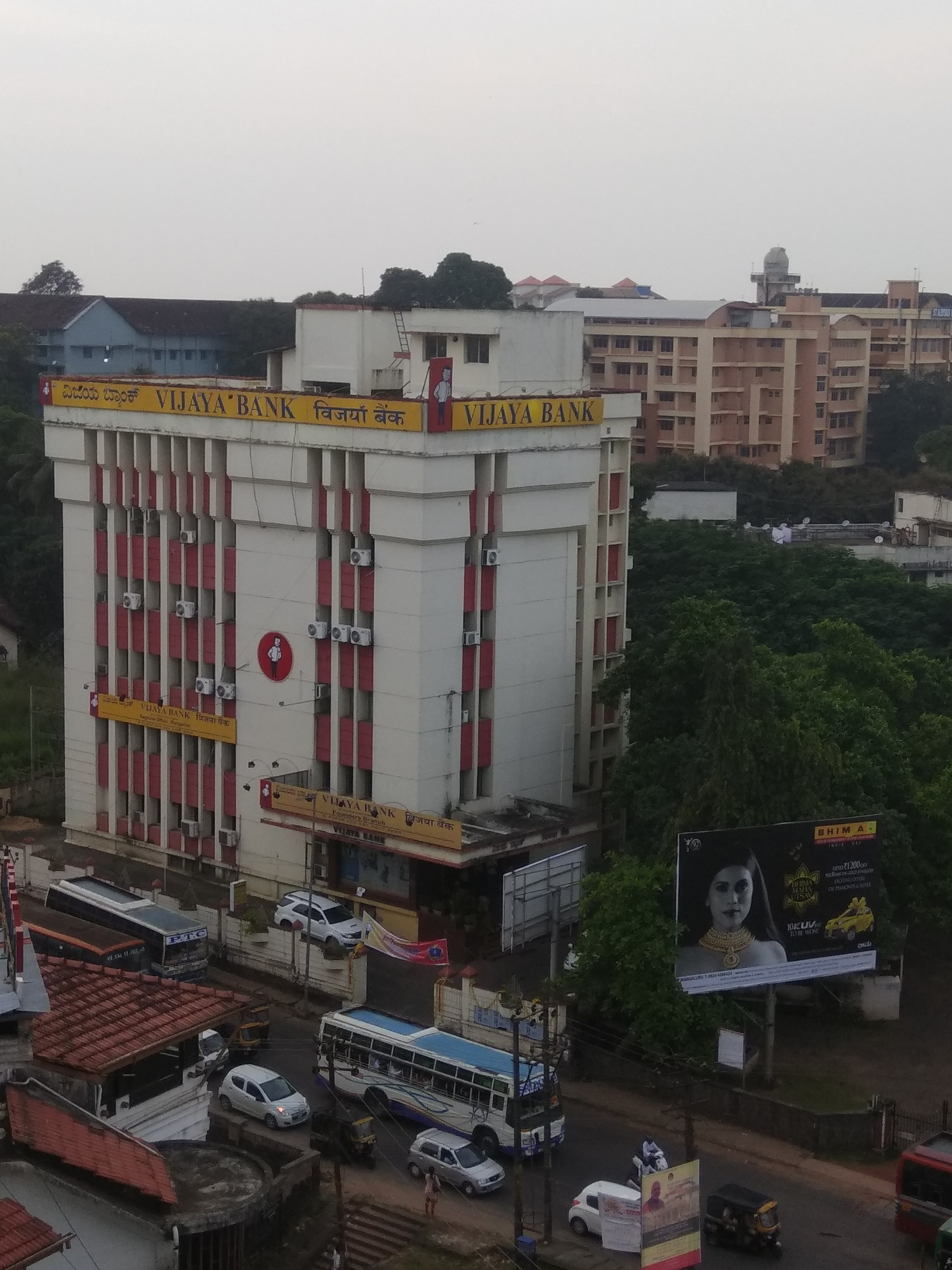
Vijaya Bank Founders Branch in Mangaluru city

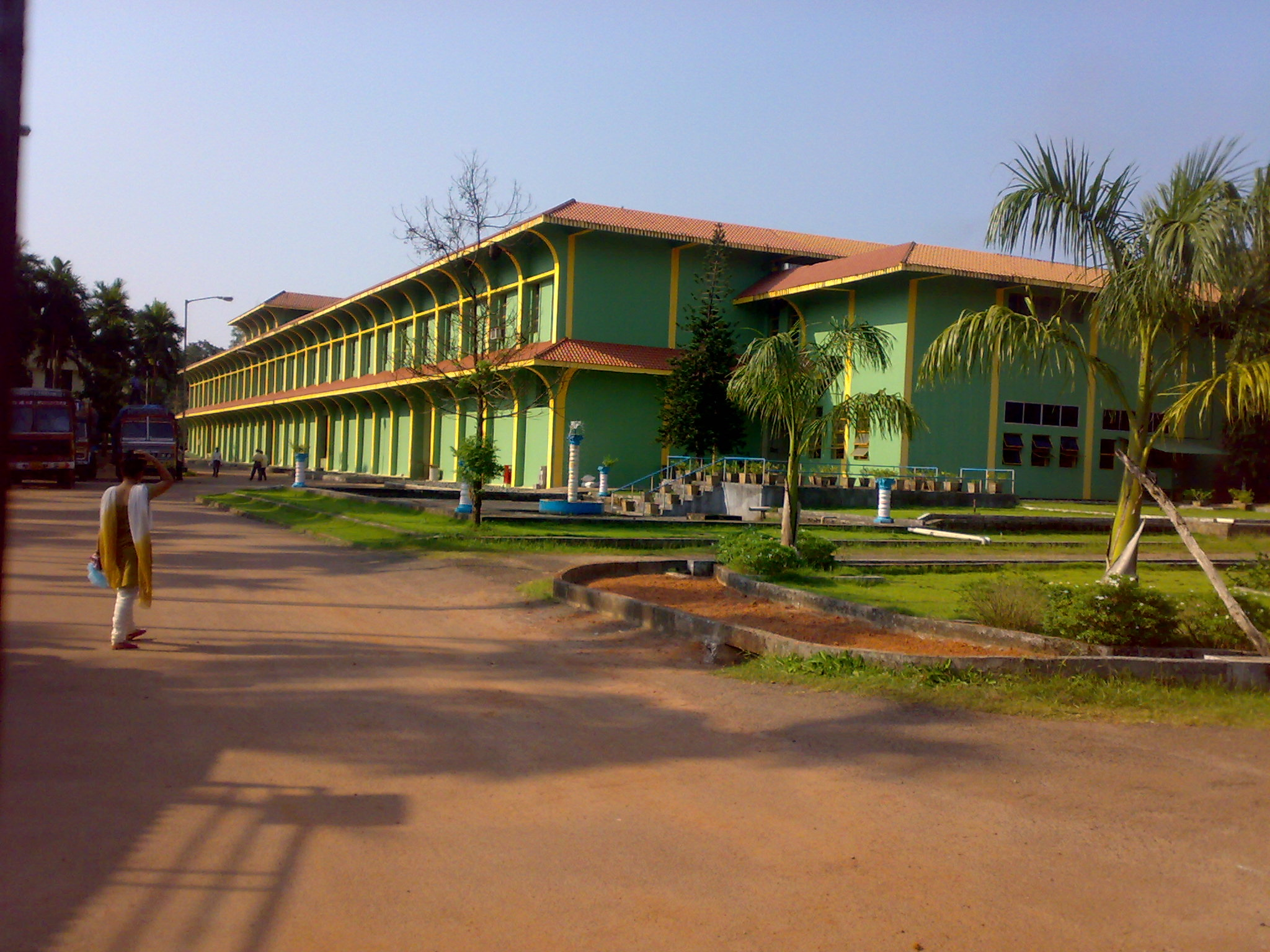
Campco office at Puttur

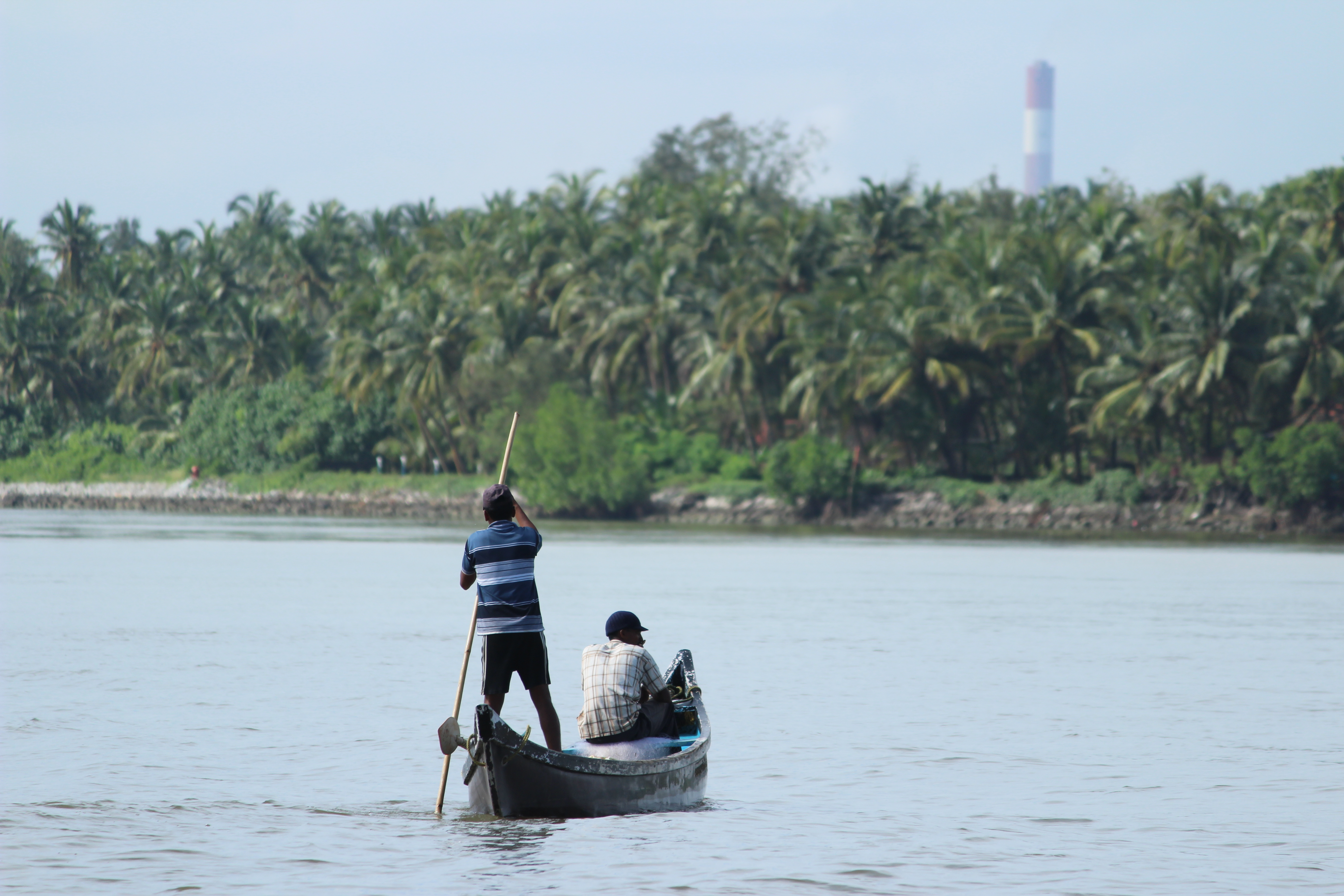
Fishermen at Sasihitlu in Dakshina Kannada

The district along with Udupi district is known as "The Cradle of Indian banking". Major nationalised banks of India such as Canara Bank, Corporation Bank, Syndicate Bank, Vijaya Bank and private sector Karnataka Bank evolved from these two districts.

Red clay tiles (Mangaluru tiles), Cashew processing factories and Beedi industry once flourished in this district.

Dakshina Kannada district has a per capita income of Rs. 218,580 which is second only to Bengaluru Urban district. Despite ranking 8th in the list of most populous districts in Karnataka, the district is the second largest contributor to the state's GSDP, with a contribution of 5.8%. In other words, despite a low population share of 3.4%, the district's share in state GSDP stands at 5.8%.

As the district is on the shore of the Arabian sea, fishing is one of the major occupation of many people. The major fishing places are Bunder (Old harbour), Panambur, Surathkal, Kotekar and Sasihitlu.

The major industries in Dakshina Kannada concentrated around Mangalore are Mangalore Chemical and Fertilizers Ltd. (MCF), Kudremukh Iron Ore Company Ltd. (KIOCL), The Canara Workshops Limited (manufacturers of Canara Springs), Mangalore Refinery and Petrochemicals Ltd. (MRPL), HPCL, BPCL, BASF, TOTAL GAZ, Bharati Shipyard Limited (BSL) etc. There is a chocolate manufacturing plant at Puttur run by CAMPCO. Major information technology and outsourcing companies have their facilities in Mangalore namely Infosys, Cognizant, Atlantic Data Bureau Services Pvt. Ltd., Lasersoft infosystems Ltd., Mphasis BPO and Endurance International Group. Two IT parks have been constructed, one Export Promotion Industrial Park (EPIP) at Ganjimutt and a second IT SEZ near Mangalore University. The Oil and Natural Gas Corporation (ONGC) plans to set up a multiproduct SEZ (Special Economic Zone) with an investment of over Rs. 350 billion.

== See also ==
- Swami Vivekananda Planetarium
- U S Mallya Indoor Stadium
- Centre for Entrepreneurship Opportunities and Learning (CEOL)
- South Kanara District Chess Association (SKDCA)
