= Kudippady =

Coordinates: 12°45′47″N 75°09′30″E

Kudipady, also called Pallataru-Kodipady, Kidippady, or Kudipadi is a village in the Puttur taluk of Dakshina Kannada district, in Karnataka, India.

It is 6 km to the west of the larger town of Puttur and 4 km south of the town of Kabaka. Mangalore, the regions chief port city, is a further 48 km to the north-west. The local economy is primarily agricultural, with most farms growing Areca nut cocoa, pepper, coconut, and bananas.

The majority of the population are Hindu and Muslim, with a smaller population of Catholics. The main languages spoken are Tulu, Konkani, Kannada and byari .

The village is famous for the Janardhana Temple.
