= Punjalkatte =

Punjalkatte Punjalakatte
- village
- Location in Karnataka, India Punjalkatte (India)
- Coordinates: 12°57′N 75°11′E
- Country: India
- State: Karnataka

Languages
  - Official: Kannada
- Time zone: UTC+5:30 (IST)
- Postal code: 574233

Punjalkatte is a village in Beltangady taluk of Dakshina Kannada district of Karnataka in India. Some parts of this small town is in Bantwal taluk. This village is located on the Mangalore-Belthangady road. The name Punjalatte is derived from the term Pancha aladakatte. This was a village and trading centre during the medieval and British period. The town has two temples, Panchakatte Sri Basavehvara temple and Goplakrishna temple; the first was built in the 15th century. Punjalkatte has two mosques. The village of late is getting amenities like degree college and a branch of Syndicate Bank.
