= Kotekar =

- Town
- Location in Karnataka, India Kotekar (India)
- Coordinates: 12.79661°N 74.887312°E
- Country: India
- State: Karnataka
- District: Dakshina Kannada

Government
  - Body: Town panchayat

Languages
  - Official: Kannada
  - Regional: Tulu, Byari, Konkani
- Time zone: UTC+5:30 (IST)
- ISO 3166 code: IN-KA
- Vehicle registration: KA 19
- Website: karnataka.gov.in

Kotekar is a Town in Dakshina Kannada district of Karnataka state, India. It is on the way from Mangalore to Talapady. The village lies on national highway NH-66. There are many temples in and around Kotekar.
