= Bandaru =

Bandaru Bandāru
- Village
- Location in Karnataka, India Bandaru (India)
- Coordinates: 12.872818°N 75.320723°E
- Country: India
- State: Karnataka
- District: Dakshina Kannada
- Talukas: Belthangady

Government
  - Type: Panchayati raj (India)
  - Body: Gram panchayat

Area
  - Total: 20.446 km^{2} (7.894 sq mi)

Population (2011)
  - Total: 4,011
  - Density: 196.2/km^{2} (508.1/sq mi)

Languages
  - Official: Tulu, Kannada
- Time zone: UTC+5:30 (IST)
- PIN: 574326
- Telephone code: 08256
- Vehicle registration: KA 21, KA 70
- Nearest cities: Belthangady, Uppinangady
- Lok Sabha constituency: Dakshina Kannada
- Vidhan Sabha constituency: Belthangady

Bandaru is a village in Dakshina Kannada district, Belthangady taluk, southern state in the Karnataka, India. It is located on the bank of the Nethravathi River.

== Description ==
As of 2011 information the location code or village code of Bandaru village is 617672. Bandaru village is located in Beltangady Tehsil of Dakshina Kannada district in Karnataka, India. It is situated 26 km away from sub-district headquarter Beltangady and 70 km away from district headquarter Mangaluru. As per 2009 stats, Bandaru village is itself a gram panchayat.

The total geographical area of village is 2044.65 hectares. Bandaru has a total population of 4,011 people. There are about 802 houses in Bandaru village. Beltangady is nearest town to Bandaru which is approximately 26 km away.

== Schools and colleges ==
There are four primary schools and a high school.

- Government Primary School, Bandaru

It was established in 1954 and it is managed by the Karnataka Department of Education. It is located in Bandaru. It is located in Belthangady block of Dakshina Kannada district of Karnataka. The school consists of Grades from 1 to 8.

- Government High School, Perlabipady
- Government Primary School, Mairoldka
- Government Primary School, Perlabaipady
- Government Primary School, Kuntalpalke

== See also ==
- Belthangady
- Ujire
- Dharmasthala
