= Thokur-62 =

Jokatte
- city
- Location in Karnataka, India
- Coordinates: 12.96°N 74.83°E
- Country: India
- State: Karnataka
- District: Dakshina Kannada

Government
  - Type: Panchayar
  - Body: Gram Panchayat Jokatte

Population (2001)
  - Total: 6,166

Languages
  - Official: Kannada
- Time zone: UTC+5:30 (IST)

Jokatte is a census town in Dakshina Kannada district in the Indian state of Karnataka.

== Demographics ==
As of 2001 India census, Thokur-62 had a population of 6166. Males constitute 51% of the population and females 49%. Thokur-62 has an average literacy rate of 77%, higher than the national average of 59.5%: male literacy is 82%, and female literacy is 71%. In Thokur-62, 13% of the population is under 6 years of age.
