= Syed Abdul Nazeer =

Governor of Andhra Pradesh (born 1958)

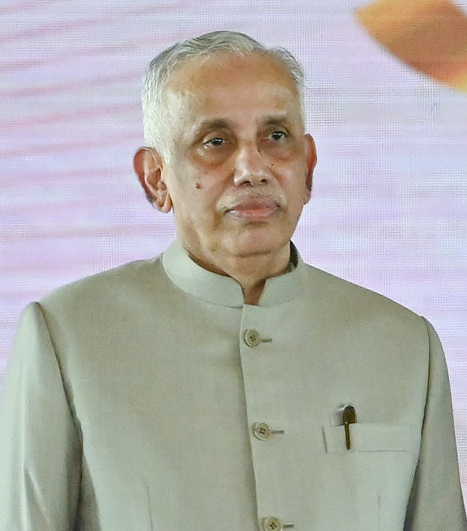
- Nazeer in 2024

22nd Governor of Andhra Pradesh
- Incumbent
- Assumed office 24 February 2023
- Chief Minister: Y. S. Jagan Mohan Reddy; N. Chandrababu Naidu
- Preceded by: Biswabhusan Harichandan

Judge in the Supreme Court of India
- In office 17 February 2017 – 4 January 2023
- Nominated by: Jagdish Singh Khehar
- Appointed by: Pranab Mukherjee

Judge in the Karnataka High Court
- In office 12 May 2003 – 16 February 2017
- Nominated by: V. N. Khare
- Appointed by: A. P. J. Abdul Kalam

Personal details
- Born: 5 January 1958 (age 68) Beluvai, Mysore State, India (present-day Karnataka)
- Party: Independent
- Education: S.D.M. Law College; Mahaveera College

S. Abdul Nazeer (born 5 January 1958) is the current Governor of Andhra Pradesh from 2023. He is a former judge of the Supreme Court of India and the Karnataka High Court. He was appointed the Governor of Andhra Pradesh on 12 February 2023.

== Early life ==
Abdul Nazeer was born into a family belonging to the Dakshina Kannada district of coastal Karnataka. He is the son of Fakir Saheb and has five siblings. He grew up in Beluvai and Moodbidri .He has completed his High schooling from Jain High School and B.Com. degree at Mahaveera College in Moodbidri. He later obtained a B.A. and LL.B. degree from SDM Law College, Mangalore (formerly known as "Sri Dharmasthala Manjunatheshwara Law College").

== Career ==
=== Judicial career (1983–January 2023) ===
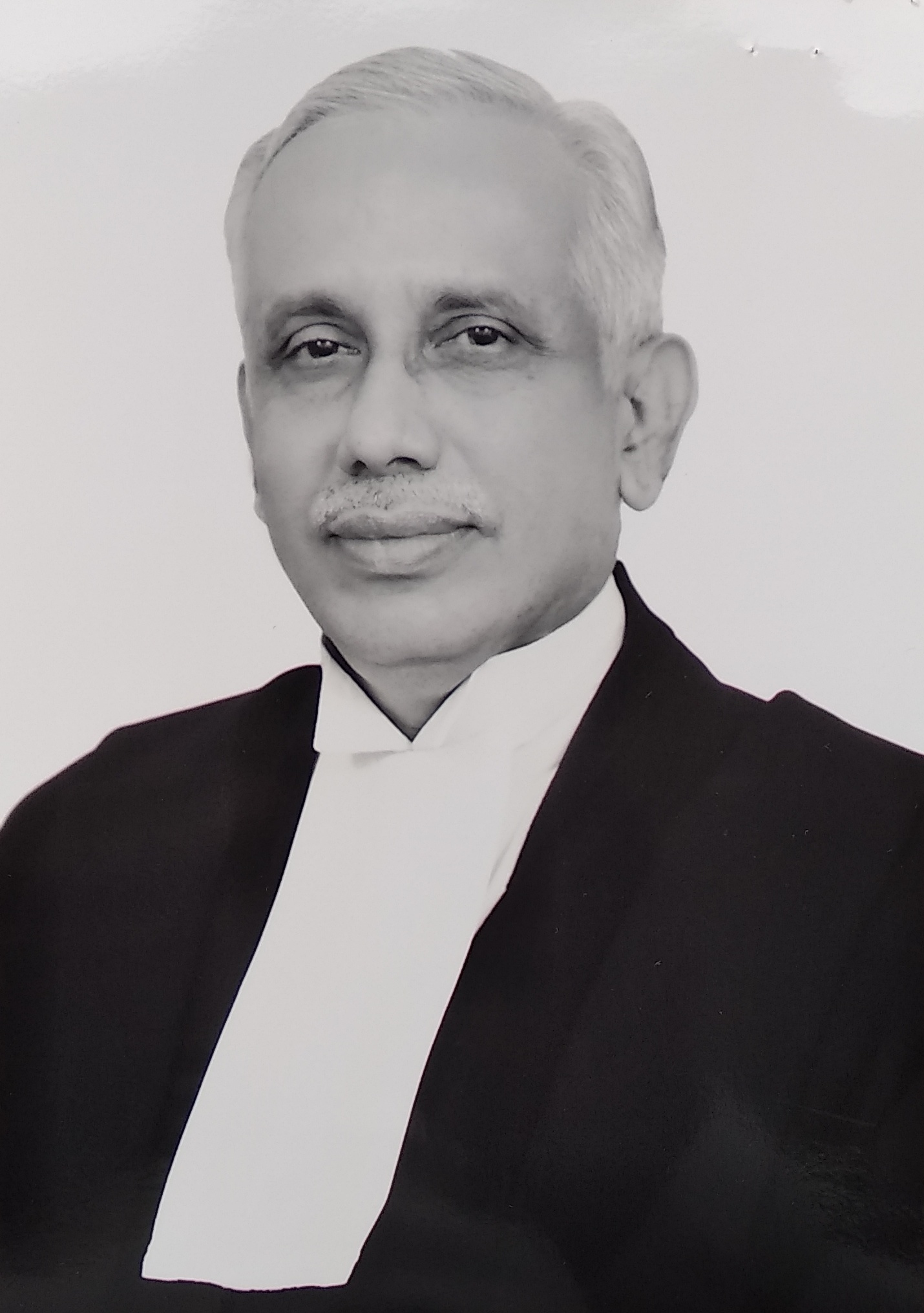
Nazeer as a judge in 2017

After obtaining his law degree, Nazeer enrolled as an advocate in 1983 and practised at the Karnataka High Court in Bangalore. In May 2003, he was appointed as an additional judge of the Karnataka High Court. He was later appointed a permanent judge of the same High Court. In February 2017, while serving as a judge of the Karnataka High Court, Nazeer was elevated to the Supreme Court of India. He became only the third judge ever to be elevated in this way, without first becoming the chief justice of some high court.

While serving on the Supreme Court, Nazeer was the lone Muslim judge in a multi-faith bench which heard the controversial Triple Talaq case in 2017. Though Nazeer and one other judge upheld the validity of the practice of Triple Talaq (Talaq-e-Biddat) based on the fact that it is permissible under Muslim Sharia Law, the majority view of the bench by 3–2 and asked the Central government to bring legislation in six months to govern marriage and divorce in the Muslim community. The court said until the government formulates a law regarding triple talaq, there would be an injunction on husbands pronouncing triple talaq on their wives.

He was also part of the five-judge bench of the 2019 Supreme Court verdict on Ayodhya dispute. He upheld the report of ASI, which stated the existence of a Hindu structure in the disputed region. He gave the verdict in favour of Ram Mandir thus ending the years-long dispute with a 5-0 verdict.

In the months leading up to his retirement, Nazeer led a constitution bench that heard cases about the 2016 Indian banknote demonetisation carried out by the Government of India. He retired on 4 January 2023.

== Governorships (2023- present) ==
On 12 February 2023, the President of India appointed Nazeer as the 24th governor of Andhra Pradesh, succeeding Biswabhusan Harichandan.
