= Kavyashree Nayak Ajeru =

Indian Yakshagana artist

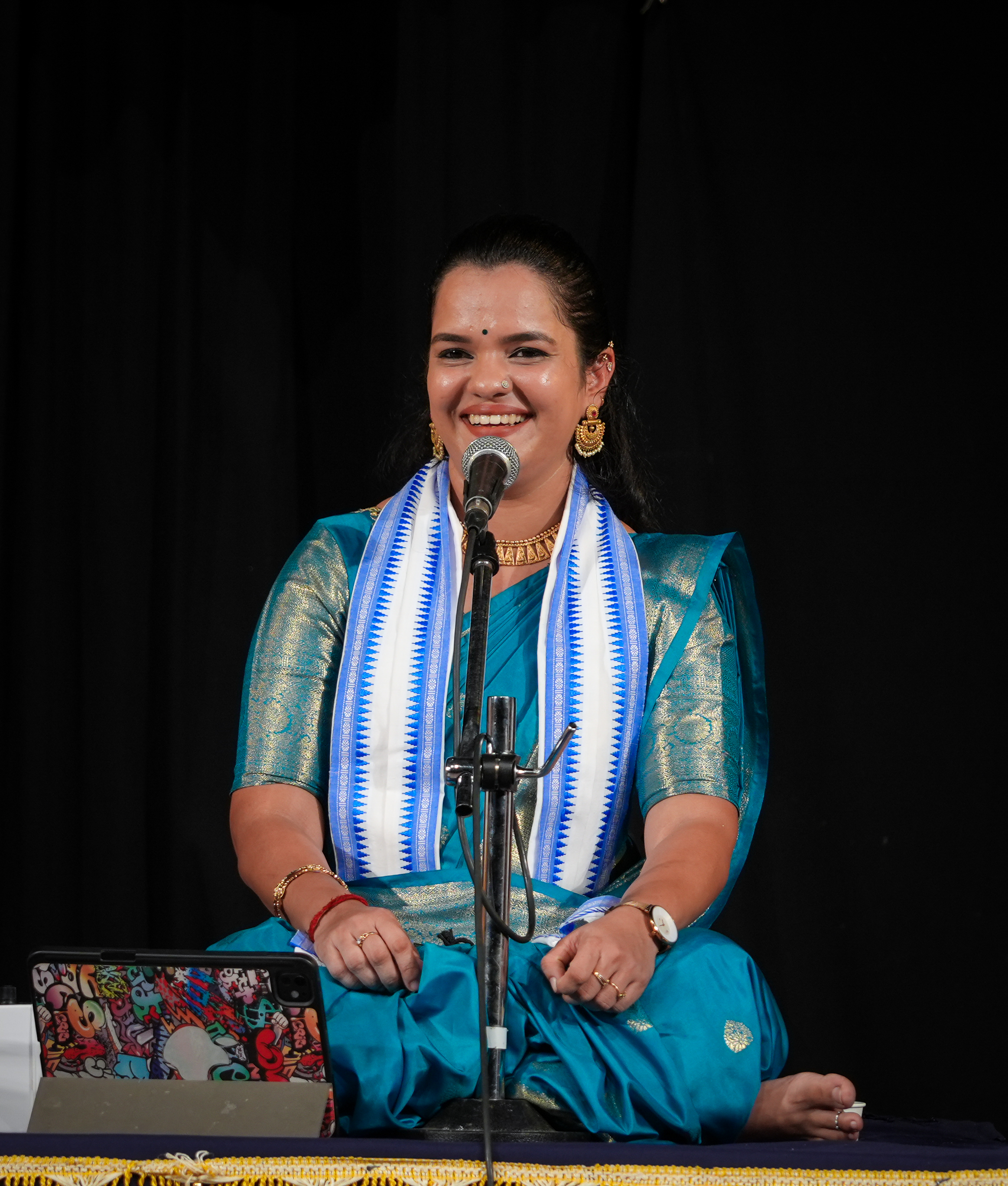
- Kavyashree Nayak Ajeru, Indian Yakshagana artist
- Born: 1994 (age 31–32); Ajeru, Puttur, Dakshina Kannada, Karnataka, India
- Occupation: Yakshagana Bhagavatha
- Years active: 2004–present
- Known for: Female Bhagavatha in Tenkutittu style Yakshagana

Kavyashree Nayak Ajeru is an Indian Yakshagana artist from Ajeru village in Dakshina Kannada district, Karnataka. She is considered one of the prominent female Bhagavathas (singer-narrators) in the Tenkutittu style of Yakshagana.

== Early life and education ==
Kavyashree was born in 1994 to Shripathi Nayak and Uma in Ajeru, a remote village about 60 km from Mangaluru in Dakshina Kannada district, Karnataka. She holds a Master of Science degree in Chemistry and a Bachelor of Education (BEd).[2] She also has junior-grade training in classical music.

== Career ==
Kavyashree's introduction to Yakshagana came at the age of nine through her father Shripathi Nayak, himself a Yakshagana artist. While accompanying her father during his training under the artist Mambadi Subrahmanya Bhat, her talent was recognised when she was asked to sing a Yakshagana song. She then studied foundational singing skills including raga and tala under Mambadi for seven months, before going on to learn Yakshagana prasanga (sub-stories) under Harish Bolanthimogaru, who has guided her for over 17 years.

Her first on-stage experience as a Bhagavatha was at the age of 10, performing in a talamaddale (oral performance) of the prasanga Sharasethu Bandhana. She has since given over 2,500 performances across India. She is proficient in both the Tenkutittu and Badagutittu styles of Yakshagana.

She has performed as a guest artist with major Yakshagana melas (troupes) including Kateel, Bappanadu, Hosanagara, Sasihitlu and Saligrama. She has been a regular performer with the Kerekkadu Makkala Mela troupe in Mulki for over ten years. She has also shared the stage with Bhagavathas such as Padyana Ganapathi Bhat, Patla Sathish Shetty and Ravichandra Kannadikatte.

=== Breaking gender barriers ===
Yakshagana has historically been dominated by male performers. Kavyashree faced significant resistance early in her career, with some senior artists refusing to perform alongside her. Her first major competitive breakthrough came at age 16, when she placed third in a Yakshagana singing competition at Moodabidri, competing against over 20 teams from Dakshina Kannada and Kasaragod district of Kerala. She also won several Gaana Vaibhava singing competitions.

Yakshagana Bhagavatha Patla Sathish Shetty has praised her contribution in expanding the scope of Yakshagana, noting she has followed in the footsteps of pioneers such as Leelavathi Baipadithaya, the first professional female Bhagavatha.

== Media recognition ==
Kavyashree is a 'B' grade artist of Akashvani, Mangaluru.[2] She has performed on Doordarshan and the Chandana channel. Video recordings of her performances have accumulated lakhs of views on social media platforms.

== Awards and recognition ==
- Featured as one of DH 23 in 2023 — Deccan Herald's annual list of notable changemakers from Karnataka (2022–23).
- Kundeshwara Samman — awarded by the Karkala Hirgana Shri Kundeshwara Temple, instituted in memory of Late Raghavendra Bhat.
