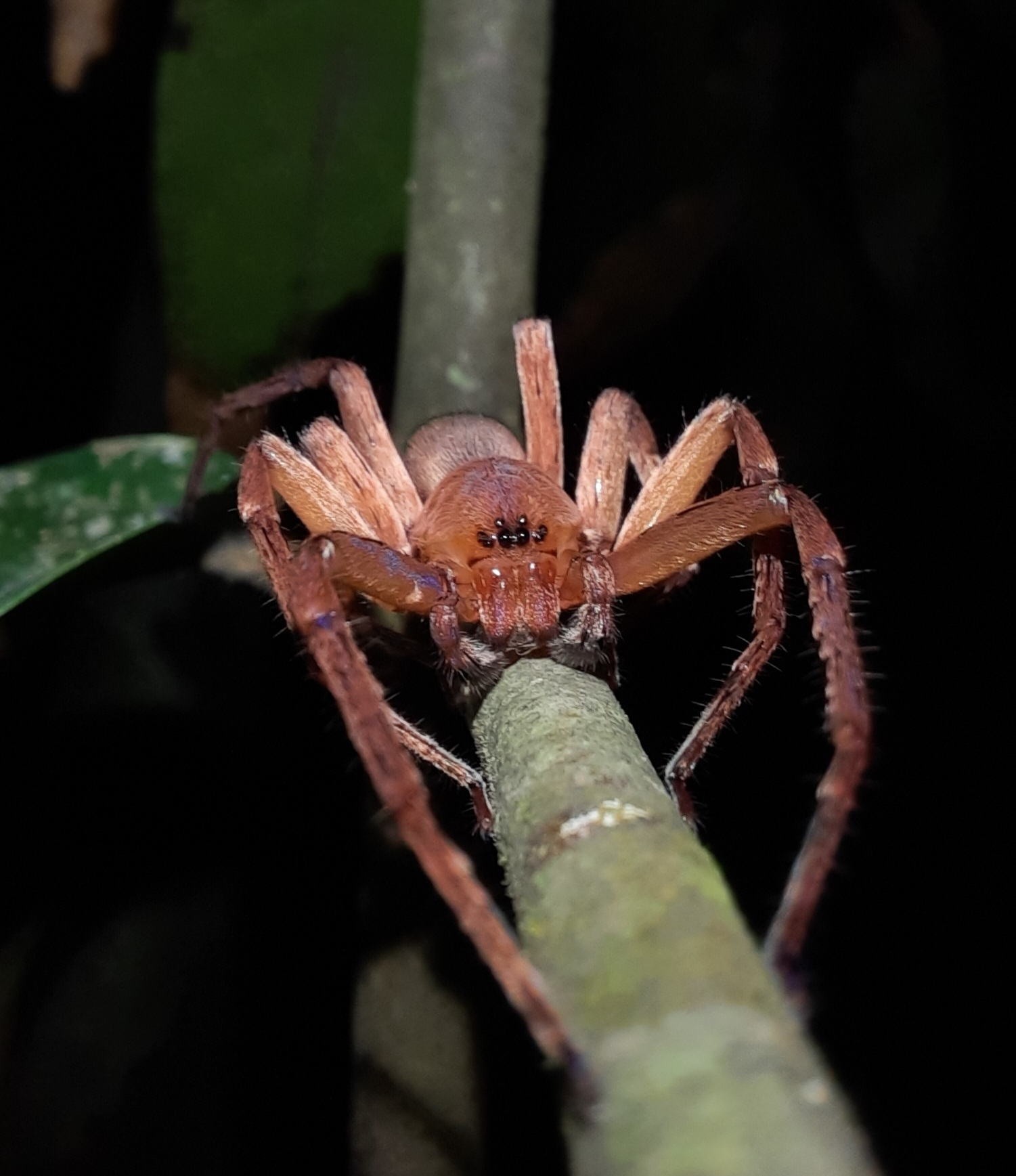
- From, Beluvai, Karnataka, India.

Scientific classification
- Domain: Eukaryota
- Kingdom: Animalia
- Phylum: Arthropoda
- Subphylum: Chelicerata
- Class: Arachnida
- Order: Araneae
- Infraorder: Araneomorphae
- Family: Sparassidae
- Genus: Thelcticopis
- Species: T. kirankhalapi

Binomial name
- Thelcticopis kirankhalapi Ahmed et al., 2015

= Thelcticopis kirankhalapi =

Species of spider

Thelcticopis kirankhalapi is a species of huntsman spider endemic to India.

== Range ==
Thelcticopis kirankhalapi is endemic to Karnataka, India. Its type of locality is a small patch of ‘Kans’ forest in Hosanagara, Shivamogga, Karnataka.

== Habitat & ecology ==
Thelcticopis kirankhalapi is classified as a mid-sized, foliage dwelling, presumably nocturnal, orange-brown, ambush hunting sparassid.

== Etymology ==
Thelcticopis kirankhalapi is named after Mr. Kiran Khalap, Managing Director & co-founder of Chlorophyll Brand and Communications Consultancy.
