= Mijar =

- Village
- Mijaru
- Location in Karnataka, India Mijar (India)
- Coordinates: 13.04025°N 74.967838°E
- Country: India
- State: Karnataka
- District: Dakshina Kannada
- Taluk: Mangalore
- city: Moodabidiri
- Region: Tulu Nadu

Government
  - Type: Gram panchayat
  - Body: Panchayath Raj

Area
  - Total: 23.84 km^{2} (9.20 sq mi)

Population (2011)
  - Total: 8,480

Languages
  - regional: Tulu, Kannada, Konkani, Beary
- Time zone: UTC+5:30 (IST)
- PIN: 574267
- Vehicle registration: KA 19

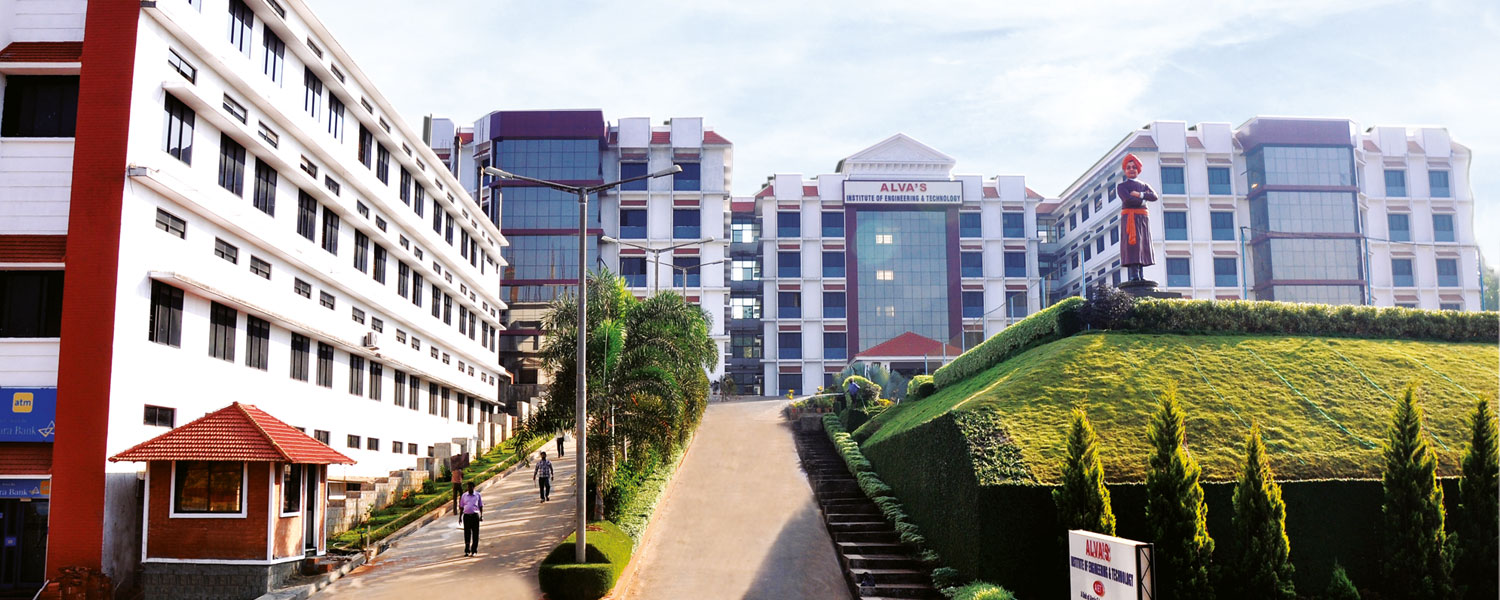
Alva's Institute of Engineering and Technology

Mijar is a village in the Manglore taluk in the city of Mangaluru of Dakshina Kannada district of the Indian state of Karnataka.

Alva's Institute of Engineering and Technology is in Mijar.
