= Thelcticopis hercules =

Scientific classification
- Kingdom: Animalia
- Phylum: Arthropoda
- Subphylum: Chelicerata
- Class: Arachnida
- Order: Araneae
- Infraorder: Araneomorphae
- Family: Sparassidae
- Genus: Thelcticopis
- Species: T. hercules

Binomial name
- Thelcticopis hercules Pocock, 1901

Species of spider

Thelcticopis hercules, is a species of spider of the genus Thelcticopis. It is endemic to Sri Lanka.
