= Srinivasa Gowda =

Indian Kambala jockey

- Born: 1991 (age 34–35); Moodabidri

Srinivasa Gowda is an Indian Kambala jockey from Mudbidri, Karnataka. Also known as Indian Usain Bolt, Srinivas came into limelight after his Kambala sprint broke Usain Bolt's world record in hundred meters. Srinivas reportedly ran 142.5 metres in 13.62 seconds along with his racing buffalo pair.

== Recognition ==
Sports Minister Kiren Rijiju offered to arrange trials for Srinivas on behalf of Sports Authority of India. The minister also promised to arrange training for Srinivas by SAI coaches. He was given a cheque of Rs 3 lakh by Karnataka chief minister. However, Srinivas refused to go for Sports Authority of India trials because Kambala is an altogether different sports from on-track sprint.

== Aftermath ==
Srinivas said that he will start training with SAI only after the Kambala season is over.
