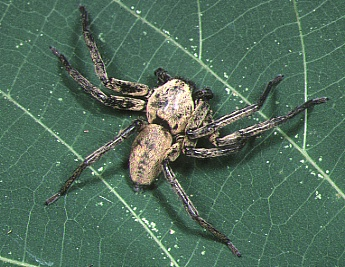
- Male T. severa on a leaf in Okinawa, Japan

Scientific classification
- Kingdom: Animalia
- Phylum: Arthropoda
- Subphylum: Chelicerata
- Class: Arachnida
- Order: Araneae
- Infraorder: Araneomorphae
- Family: Sparassidae
- Genus: Thelcticopis
- Species: T. severa

Binomial name
- Thelcticopis severa L. Koch, 1875

Synonyms
- Stasina japonica; Stasina maculifera; Thelcticopis jiulongensis; Theleticopes jiulongensis; Theleticopes severa; Themeropis severa

= Thelcticopis severa =

Species of spider

Thelcticopis severa is a species of huntsman spider found in China, Laos, Korea, and Japan. It is the type species for the genus Thelcticopis, and was first described by Charles Athanase Walckenaer in 1875.

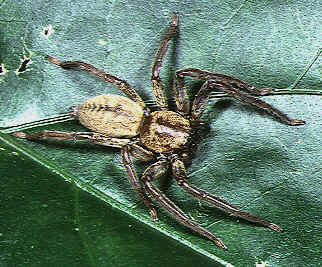
Female T. severa on a leaf in Okinawa, Japan
