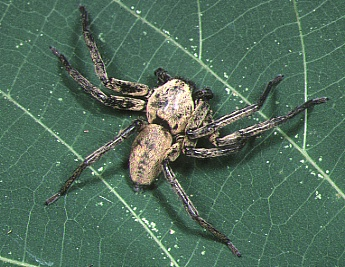
- Male Thelcticopis severa

Scientific classification
- Kingdom: Animalia
- Phylum: Arthropoda
- Subphylum: Chelicerata
- Class: Arachnida
- Order: Araneae
- Infraorder: Araneomorphae
- Family: Sparassidae
- Genus: Thelcticopis; Karsch, 1884

Type species
- Themeropis severa L. Koch, 1875

Species
- See text

Diversity
- 57 species

= Thelcticopis =

Genus of spiders

Thelcticopis is a genus of huntsman spiders that occurs almost exclusively in the area India to Japan to New Guinea and Fiji. Two geographically outlying species, T. humilithorax (Simon, 1909) from Gabon (originally said as the "French Congo") and T. truculenta Karsch, 1884 from São Tomé and Príncipe are both probably misplaced in this genus.

Another species originally described from Costa Rica was suggested to belong to the genus by Jäger, 2005 as Thelcticopis pestai (Reimoser, 1939), but later revised as Decaphora pestai (Reimoser, 1939), by Rheims & Alayón, 2014.

This genus is distinguished by the abdomen narrowing behind and ending in terminal spinnerets which are borne on a tubular stalk separated at the base by a membranous ring. They are often brownish-red, the abdomen is either of uniform color or shows paired spots. However, some species are black, yellow or green.

== Species ==
As of November 2022 it contains 51 species:

- Thelcticopis ajax Pocock, 1901 — India
- Thelcticopis ancorum Dyal, 1935 — Pakistan
- Thelcticopis bicornuta Pocock, 1901 — India
- Thelcticopis bifasciata Thorell, 1891 — Nicobar Islands
- Thelcticopis biroi Kolosváry, 1934 — New Guinea
- Thelcticopis buu (Logunov & Jäger, 2015) — Vietnam
- Thelcticopis canescens Simon, 1887 — Andaman Islands, Myanmar
- Thelcticopis celebesiana Merian, 1911 — Sulawesi
- Thelcticopis convoluticola Strand, 1911 — Aru Islands
- Thelcticopis cuneisignata Chrysanthus, 1965 — New Guinea
- Thelcticopis dahanensis (Zhu & Zhong, 2020) — Taiwan
- Thelcticopis fasciata Thorell, 1897 — Myanmar
- Thelcticopis flavipes Pocock, 1897 — Moluccas
- Thelcticopis folia Jäger & Praxaysombath, 2009 — Laos
- Thelcticopis goramensis Thorell, 1881 — Malaysia
- Thelcticopis hercules Pocock, 1901 — Sri Lanka
- Thelcticopis humilithorax Simon, 1910 — Congo
- Thelcticopis huyoplata Barrion & Litsinger, 1995 — Philippines
- Thelcticopis insularis Karsch, 1881 — Micronesia
- Thelcticopis kaparanganensis Barrion & Litsinger, 1995 — Philippines
- Thelcticopis karnyi Reimoser, 1929 — Sumatra
- Thelcticopis kianganensis Barrion & Litsinger, 1995 — Philippines
- Thelcticopis kirankhalapi Ahmed et al., 2015 — India
- Thelcticopis klossi Reimoser, 1929 — Sumatra
- Thelcticopis luctuosa Doleschall, 1859 — Java
- Thelcticopis maindroni Simon, 1906 — India
- Thelcticopis modesta Thorell, 1890 — Malaysia
- Thelcticopis moesta Doleschall, 1859 — Amboina
- Thelcticopis moolampilliensis Jose & Sebastian, 2007 — India
- Thelcticopis nigrocephala Merian, 1911 — Sulawesi
- Thelcticopis ochracea Pocock, 1899 — New Britain
- Thelcticopis orichalcea Simon, 1880 — Sumatra, Borneo
- Thelcticopis papuana Simon, 1880 — New Guinea
- Thelcticopis pennata Simon, 1901 — Malaysia
- Thelcticopis picta Thorell, 1887 — Myanmar
- Thelcticopis pinmini (Cai & Zhong, 2021) — China
- Thelcticopis quadrimunita Strand, 1911 — New Guinea
- Thelcticopis rubristernis Strand, 1911 — Aru Islands
- Thelcticopis rufula Pocock, 1901 — India
- Thelcticopis sagittata Hogg, 1915 — New Guinea
- Thelcticopis salomonum Strand, 1913 — Solomon Islands
- Thelcticopis scaura Simon, 1910 — São Tomé
- Thelcticopis serambiformis Strand, 1907 — India
- Thelcticopis severa L. Koch, 1875 — China, Laos, Korea, Japan
- Thelcticopis simplerta Barrion & Litsinger, 1995 — Philippines
- Thelcticopis telonotata Dyal, 1935 — Pakistan
- Thelcticopis truculenta Karsch, 1884 — São Tomé, Principe
- Thelcticopis unciformis (Zhu & Zhong, 2020) — Taiwan
- Thelcticopis vasta L. Koch, 1873 — Fiji
- Thelcticopis virescens Pocock, 1901 — India
- Thelcticopis zhengi Liu, Li & Jäger, 2010 — China
