= Kodangallu =

Kodangallu is a small locality in Moodabidri in the state of Karnataka, southwest India. It is located about 2 km from Moodbidri en route Dharmasthala It is situated about 37 km from Mangalore city via NH169.The Jain tombs and Nyaya basadi at Kodangallu are of great historical interest.

== Name ==
Kodangallu's name came because of a big stone lying there.

== Schools ==
Sri Mahaveera College, situated at Kodangallu was founded by Academy of General Education, Manipal and Sri Mahaveera College Trust 1965.
