= Beluvai =

Beluvai Homalke
- Village
- Location in Karnataka, India Beluvai (India)
- Coordinates: 13.127715°N 74.996947°E
- Country: India
- State: Karnataka
- District: Dakshina Kannada
- Talukas: Moodabidri

Government
  - Body: Gram panchayat

Area
  - Total: 25.54 km^{2} (9.86 sq mi)

Population (2011)
  - Total: 10,220
  - Density: 400.2/km^{2} (1,036/sq mi)

Languages
  - Official: Tulu, Kannada, Konkani, Beary
- Time zone: UTC+5:30 (IST)
- Postal code: 574213
- ISO 3166 code: IN-KA
- Vehicle registration: KA 19
- Literacy (2011): 89.09% Male:92.57% Female:85.73%
- Lok Sabha constituency: Mangalore
- Vidhan Sabha constituency: Mulki-Moodabidri.
- MP: Capt. Brijesh Chowta
- MLA: Umanatha Kotian
- Website: karnataka.gov.in

Beluvai is a village in the southern state of Karnataka, India. It is located in the Moodabidri taluk of Dakshina Kannada district. It is located around 42 km north-east of Mangalore city.

== Demographics ==
As of 2011 India census, Beluvai had a population of 10,220 with 5,042 males and 5,178 females. Beluvai village has higher literacy rate compared to Karnataka. In 2011, literacy rate of Beluvai village was 89.09 % compared to 75.36 % of Karnataka. In Beluvai Male literacy stands at 92.57 % while female literacy rate was 85.73 %.

== See also ==
- Dakshina Kannada
- Districts of Karnataka
