= Mud sports =

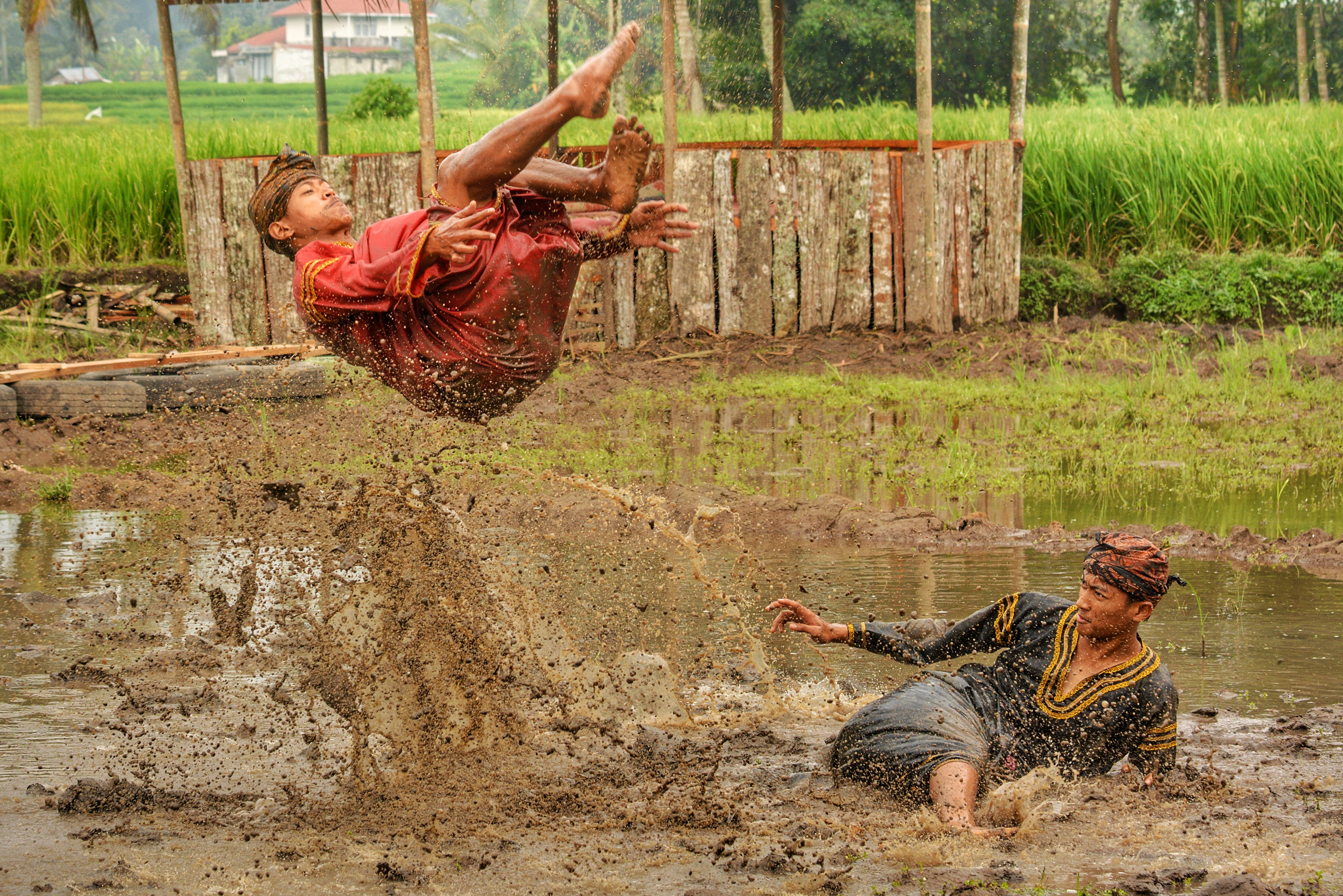
People doing martial arts in the mud

Mud sports are sports that take place in, or heavily incorporate, mud.

== List of mud sports ==
=== Mud bogging ===
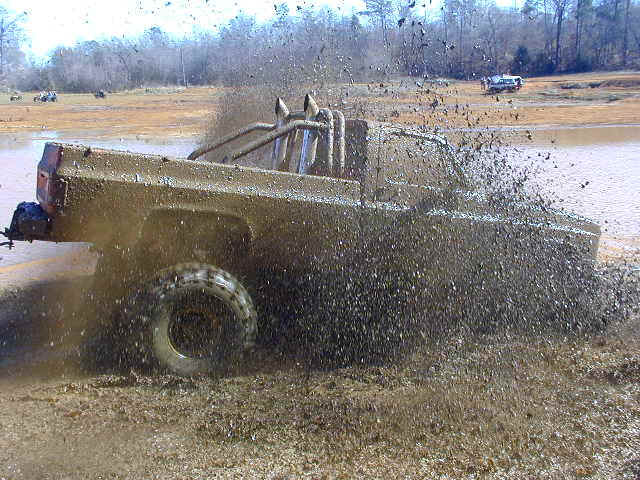
An example of mud bogging

Mud bogging, or mudding, is a form of off-road motorsport popular in Canada and the United States in which the goal is to drive a vehicle through a pit of mud or a track of a set length. Winners are determined by the distance traveled through the pit. However, if several vehicles are able to travel the entire length, the time taken to traverse the pit will determine the winner.

=== Mud run ===
Mud runs are a popular activity involving mud. Participants run a distance of 5 kilometres (3 mi) to as long as 20 kilometres (10 mi), while crawling through mud bogs, and battling other obstacles. A notable example is Tough Mudder. In the United States, U.S. Mud Sports also organizes events.

=== Mud wrestling ===
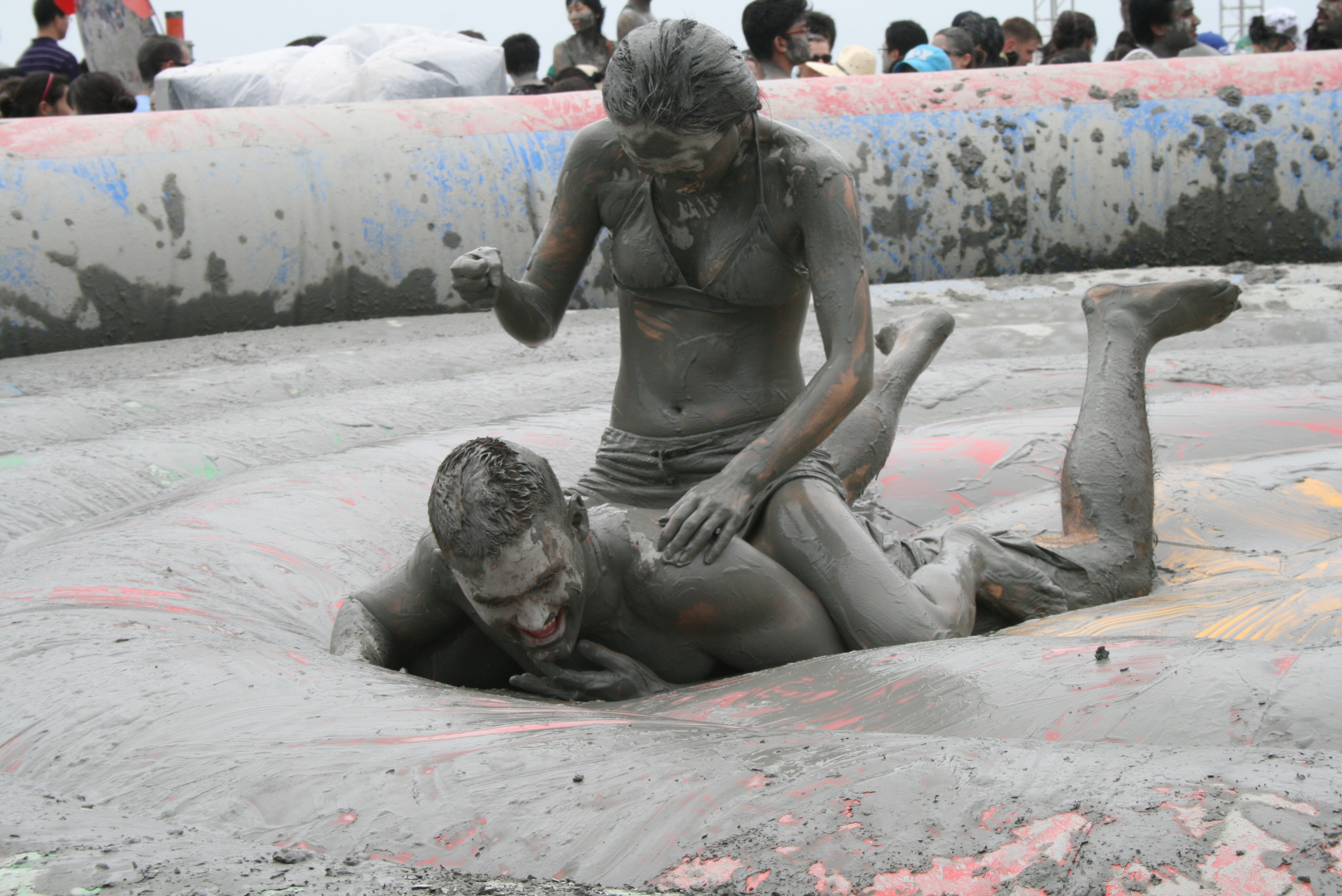
A man and a woman mud wrestling

Mud wrestling is a form of wrestling that takes place in mud.

=== Dirt biking ===
Dirt biking involves biking through muddy tracks and courses.

=== Swamp football ===
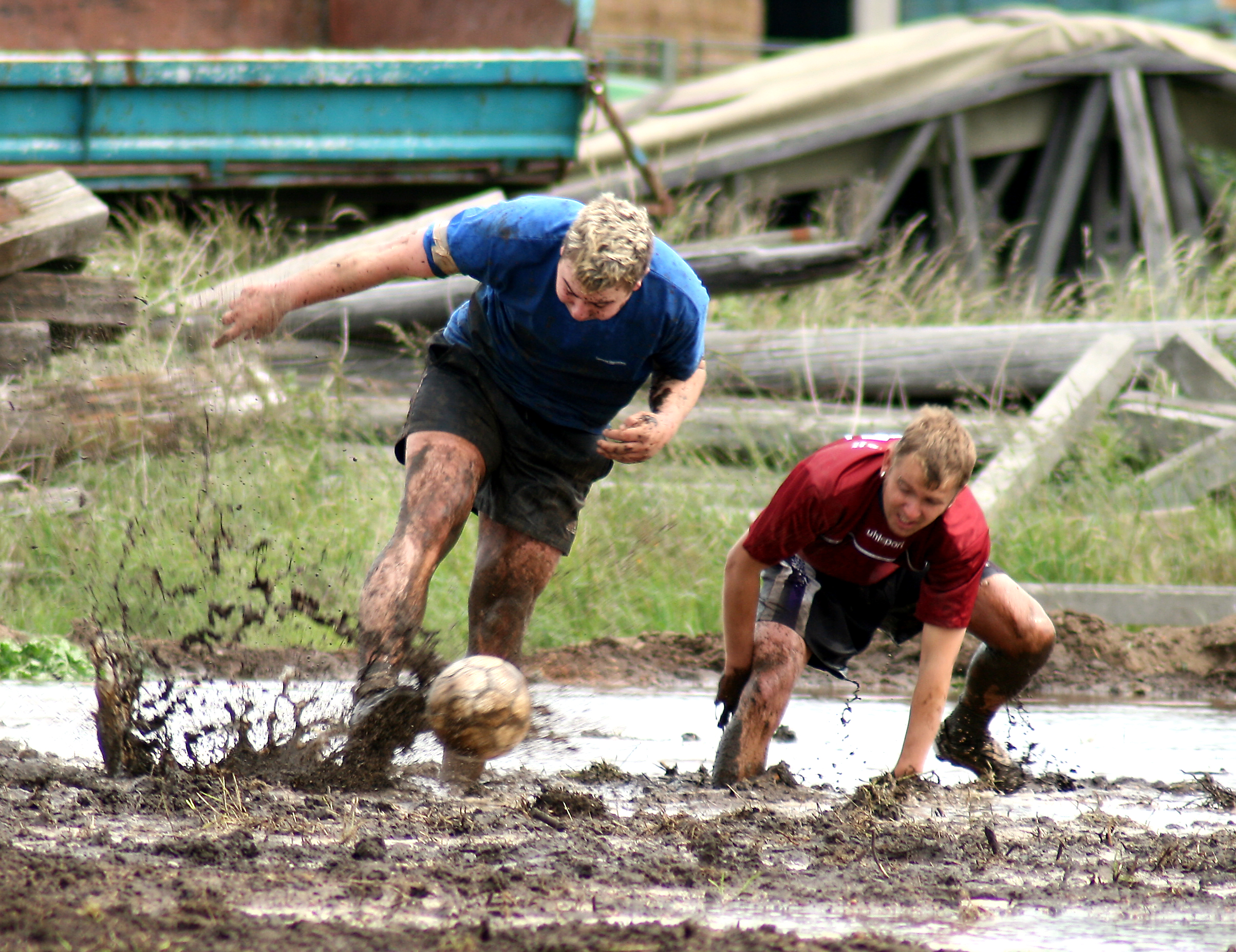
A swamp football tournament

Swamp football is a variation of association football played in bogs and swamps, originating from Finland.

=== Mud volleyball ===
United States towns and cities such as Albuquerque, New Mexico, Gillette, Wyoming and Anchorage, Alaska hold yearly events in which participants play volleyball in a giant mud pit.

=== Mud Olympics ===
The Mud Olympics (German: Wattolümpiade) was a mud sports event in the German town of Brunsbüttel, first held in 2004. It featured sports including mud handball, mud football and mud sled racing. Money was raised for cancer patients. The final edition took place in 2024.

== Risks ==
A 2019 study published in the Sports Medicine – Open journal found that there was a meaningful risk of infection from mud sports events. The study recommended shifts in practice and policy, such as site condition monitoring, improved messaging about the risks of infection, and implementation of pre- and post-event wash stations. More than 100 people contracted a bacterial infection after a 2024 Tough Mudder event in California.
