= Moodabidri =

Moodabidri Bedra
- Town
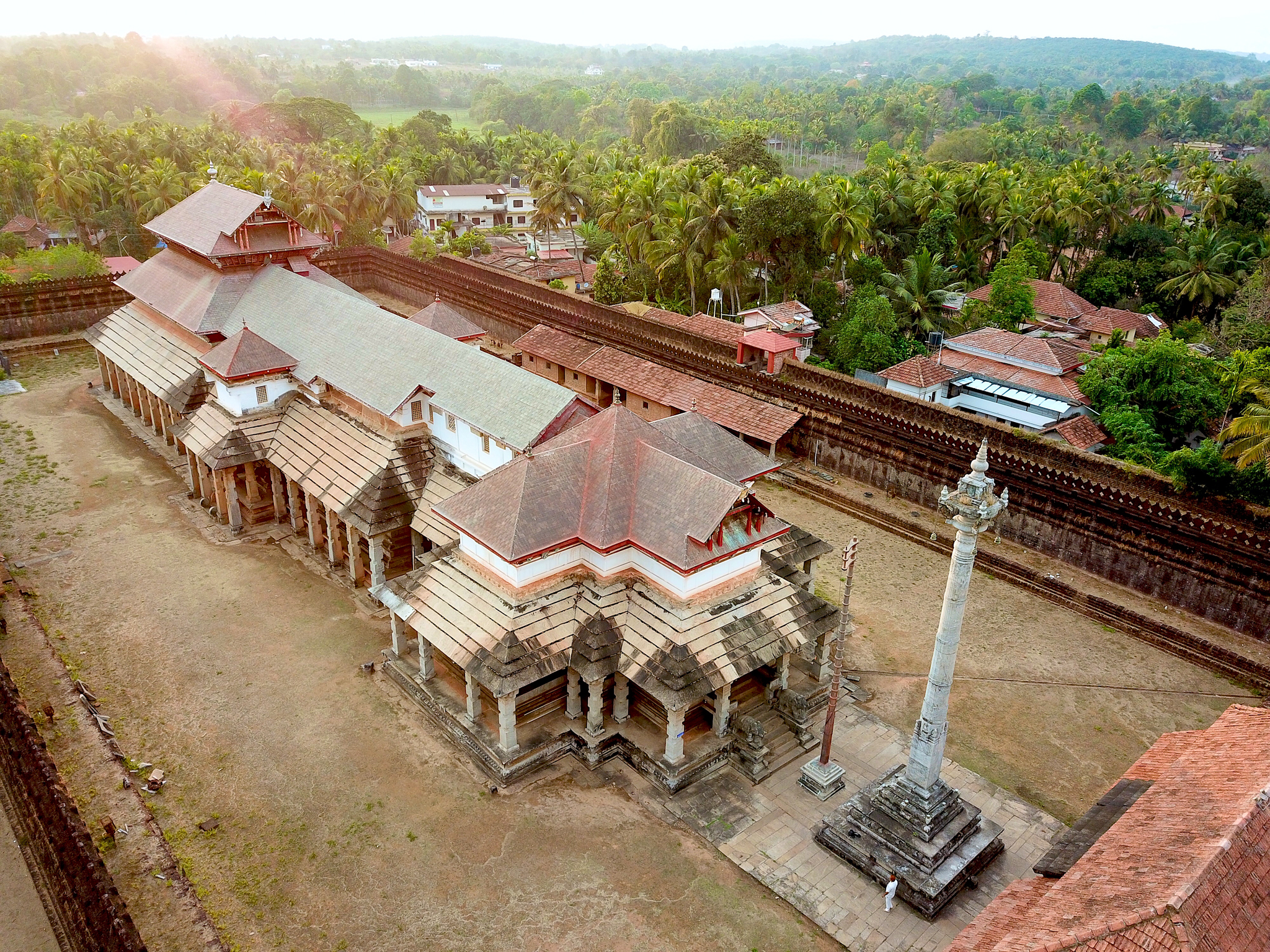
- Saavira Kambada Basadi Jain temple at Moodabidri
- Nicknames: Jain Kashi of the South, Pensioner's Paradise, Shikshana Kashi of the South (Educational Hub)
- Location in Karnataka, India
- Coordinates: 12.9101°N 75.003°E
- Country: India
- State: Karnataka
- District: Dakshina Kannada

Government
  - Type: Town Municipal
  - Body: Municipal Council

Area
  - Total: 39.62 km^{2} (15.30 sq mi)
- Elevation: 147 m (482 ft)

Population (2011)
  - Total: 29,431
  - Density: 742.8/km^{2} (1,924/sq mi)

Languages
  - Official: Kannada,Tulu
- Time zone: UTC+5:30 (IST)
- PIN: 574227
- Vehicle registration: KA 19
- Distance from Mangalore city: 34 kilometres (21 mi)
- Website: moodbidritown.mrc.gov.in

Moodabidri or Moodubidire (Mūḍubidire; also called Mudbidri, Moodbidri, Bidrem and Bedra) is a city and taluk in Dakshina Kannada district. It lies 34 km northeast of the district headquarters, Mangaluru, in Karnataka, India.

Because of widely grown bamboo in ancient days, this place was named as Moodabidri. Moodabidri comes from two Kannada words, Moodu "east" and Bidiru "bamboo".

== Demographics ==
Religion in Moodabidri (2011)
1. Hinduism (65.1%)
2. Islam (21.7%)
3. Christianity (9.69%)
4. Jainism (3.37%)
5. Sikhism (0.01%)
6. Buddhism (0.02%)
7. Other or Not stated (0.07%)

As of 2001 India census, Moodabidri had a population of 25,710. Males constitute 48% of the population and females 52%. Moodabidri has an average literacy rate of 88.57%, Male literacy is 93.13%, and female literacy is 84.13%.

Moodabidri basically contains two villages: Pranthya and Marnad. Moodabidri is also called as "Jaina Kashi of the South".

== Location ==
Moodabidri is on National Highway 169 (old NH 13). It is accessible from Mangalore city (34 km away) by road. Mangalore International Airport is 23 km away from Moodabidri.

It is 54 km from Udupi and 18 km from Karkala. Other nearby places are Venur (20 km), Belthangady (37 km), Kudremukh (66 km), Agumbe (68 km), Puttur (54 km) Siddakatte (12 km) and Mijar (5 km).

== Religion and culture ==
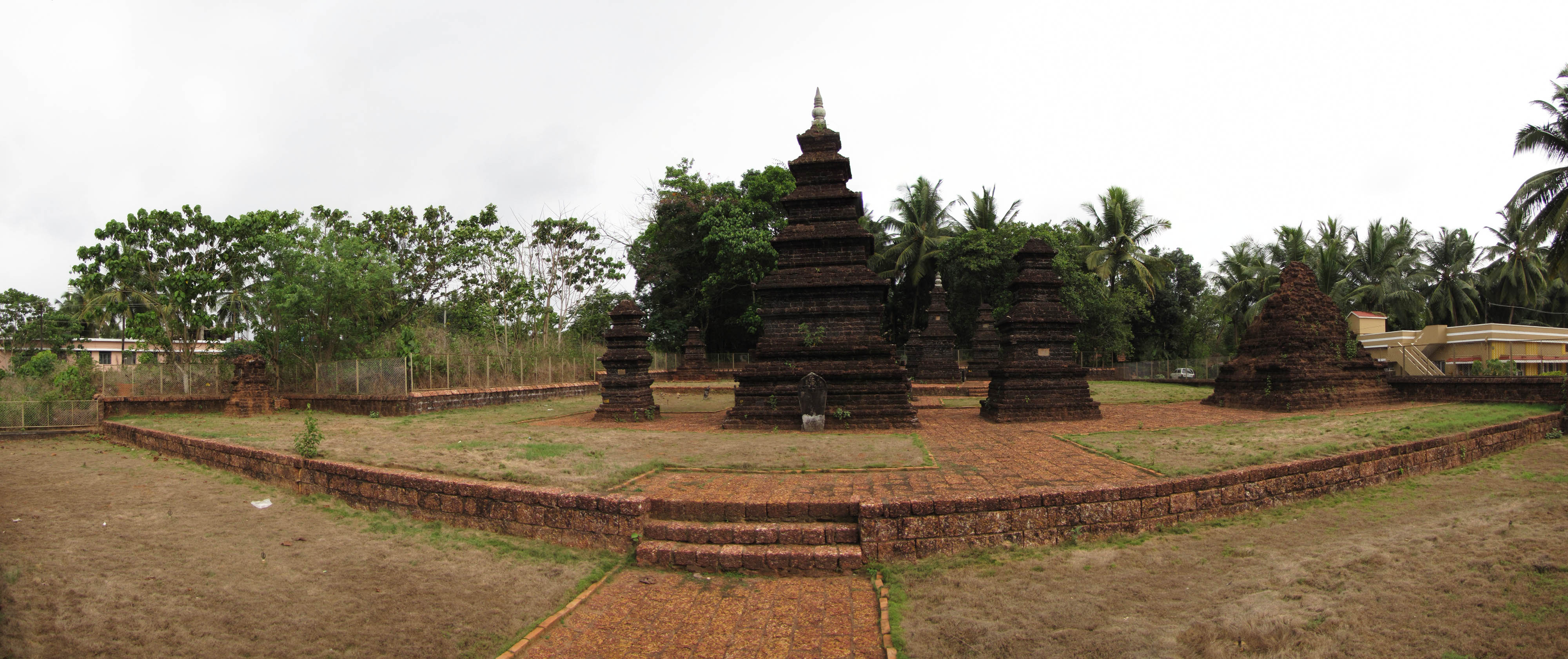
Jain Bhattaraka Samadhis

Jainism was and still is strongly practised in Moodabidri. The Thousand Pillars Temple (Saavira Kambada Basadi) is a holy shrine for Jains across the country. It also has Guru Basadi which houses the treasured Dhavala text.

Hanuman temple of Moodbidri is one of the area's Hanuman temples. Here the devotees offer tender coconut as offering to the God. On Saturdays an average of about four to five thousand tender coconuts are offered to Lord Hanuman.

Shri Venkataramana temple is a rock built temple and is known for the celebration of Karthika Deepotsava, holy Keredeepotsava, Sharada Mahotsava, and other functions. There are carved Dashavatar statues in the other veranda.

A sizable number practice Roman Catholicism in Moodbidri. There are around 14 churches in and around Moodbidri Varado. Among them, is the 16th century old Portuguese-built church Igreja da Santa Cruz Hospet or Hospet Church.

== Tradition and festivals ==
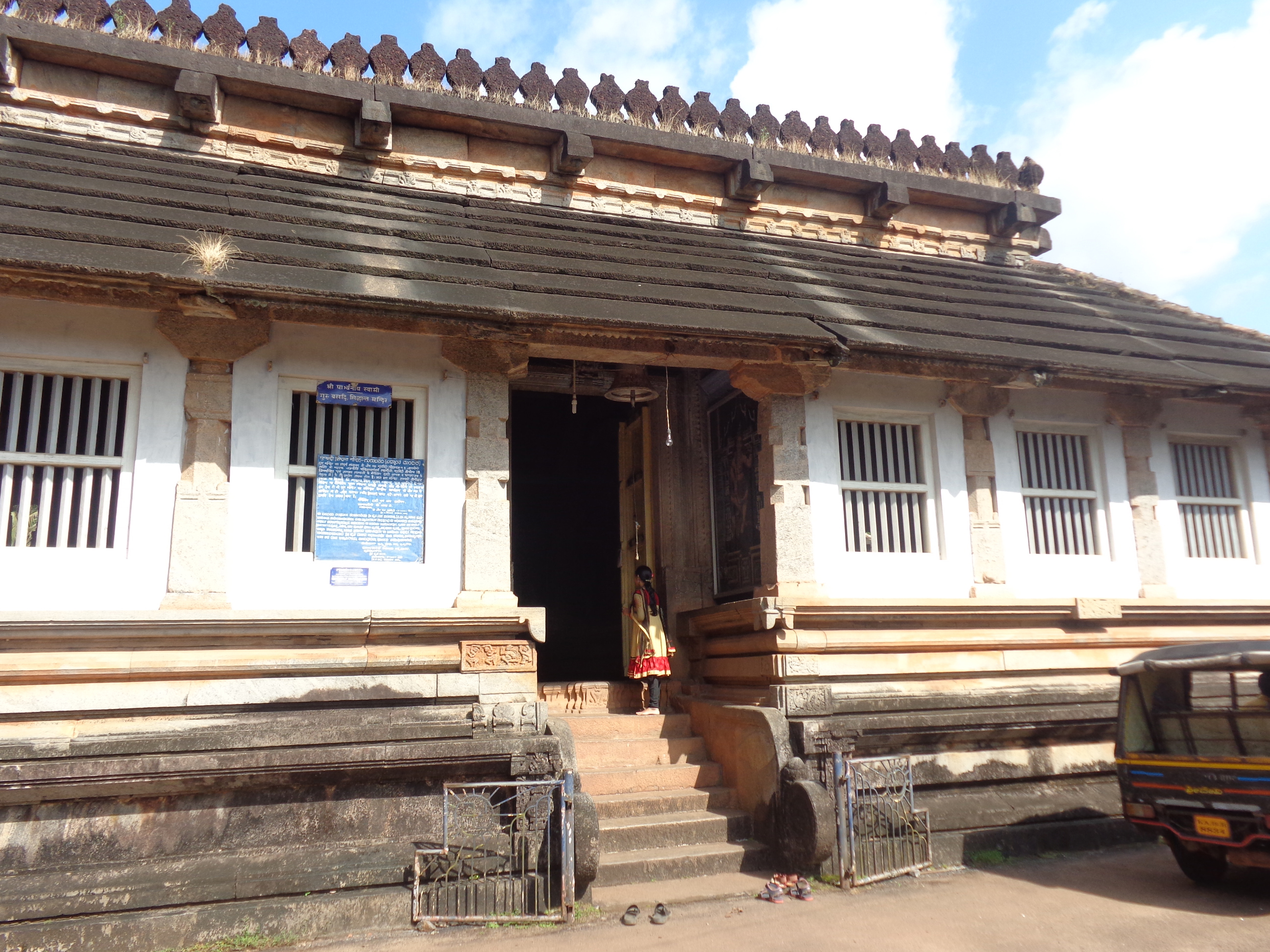
Guru basadi, built in 714 AD

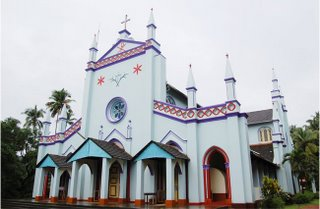
Holy Cross Church, Hosabettu, Moodabidri

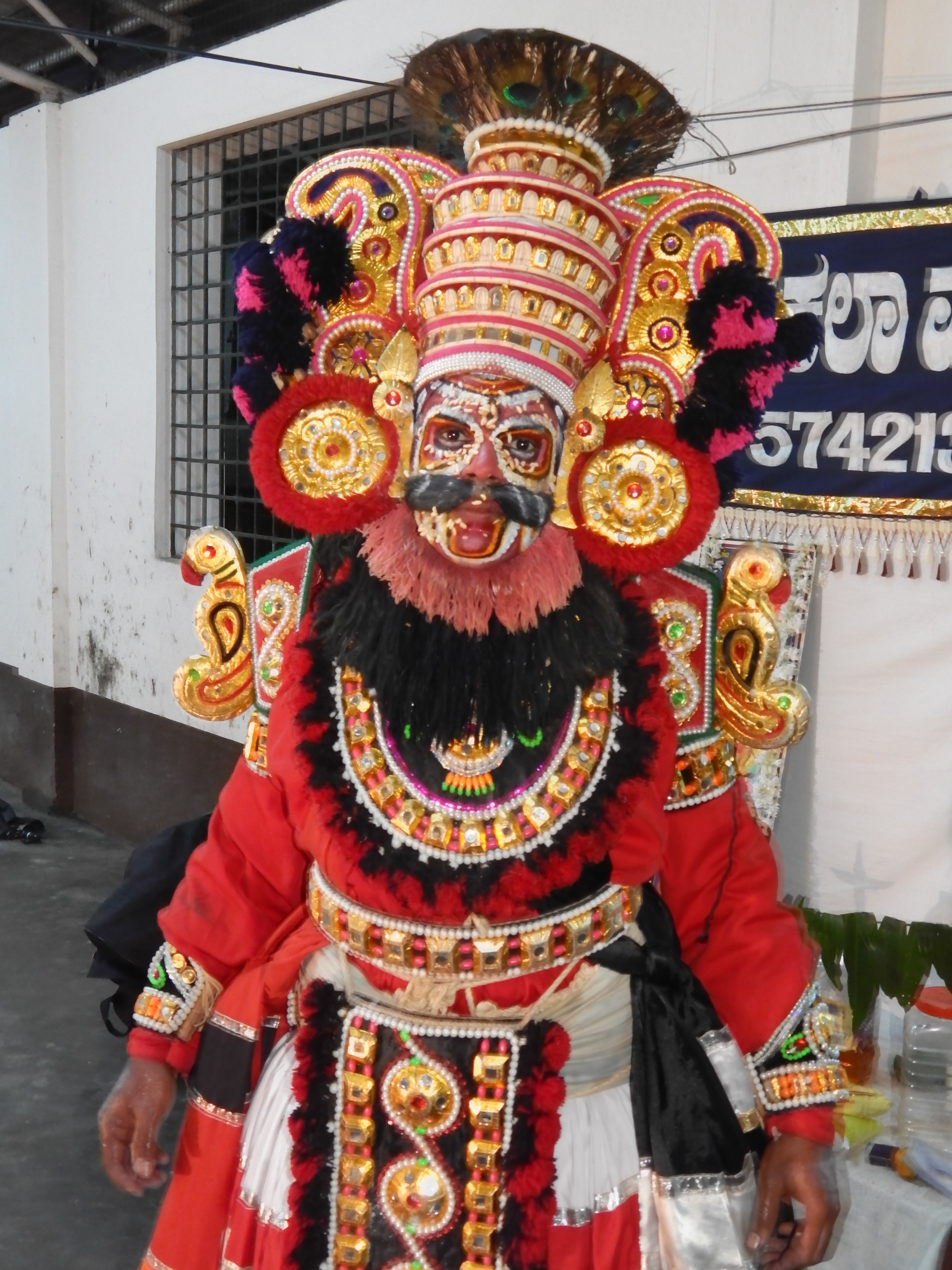
Typical Thenkuthittu Yakshagana artist

=== Pilivesha ===
Pilivesha (Tiger dance) is a unique form of folk dance in Dakshina Kannada. Since tiger is considered as the favored carrier of Goddess Sharada (the deity in whose honor Dussera is celebrated), this dance is performed during the Dussera celebration. It is also performed during other festivals like Krishna Janmasthami and Ganesh Chathurthi. Moodbidri is famous for Pilivesha performed on Ganesha Chathurthi just as Mangalore is famous for Dashera Pilivesha and Udupi for Janmashtami Pilivesha. one of the culture of Mangalore, performers are well trained and dedication is high.

=== Navaraatri ===
During Navaraatri, the idol of Sharada Maathe is kept at Shri Lakshmi Venkateshwara Temple, Ponnechari, Moodabidri, by Saarvajanika Samithi and celebrated for two days very grandly. The Sharada Maathe idol is kept at the Venkataramana Temple Moodabidri and here it is celebrated for three days.

=== Maari Pooja or Rashi Pooja ===
There are five Maari Gudi Temples in Moodbidri. Old Maari Gudi at Swaraj Maidan, Maari Gudi at Swaraj Maidan, Maari Gudi at Mahaveera College, Maari Gudi at Kotabagilu and maari Gudi at kallabettu.

=== Bhoota Kola ===
Bhoota Kola or spirit worship is practised here. Bhoota Kola is usually done at night. Most of the temples have Bhoota Kola on their annual festival.

=== Kambala ===
Kambala or buffalo race is conducted in water-filled paddy fields. The Rani Abbakka Kambala Stadium is constructed at Kadala Kere Nisarga Dhama. Every year Kambla is organised here for two days. Mijar Jodu Kambla is another happening event, to see.

=== Korikatta ===
Korikatta (cockfight) is another favourite sport for village people on the annual festival of the temples. To its supporters, cockfight, an ancient sport involving a fight between specially reared fowls held at the temples precincts in northern parts of Kasaragod, is not a blood sport but a feature of the rich cultural heritage of Tulunadu and an ancient ritual associated with the ‘daivasthanams’ (temples) here.

=== Nagaradhane ===
Nagaradhane or snake worship is practised according to the popular belief of the Naga Devatha to go underground and guard the species which lived on top.

=== Dindu / Karthik Poornima (Lakshadeepotsava) ===
Konkani-speaking GSBs have their own tradition of celebrating Lakshadeepotsava (Dindu) five-day festival starting from Uthana Dwadashi (Tulasi Pooja Day – the day on which four-month chaturmasa of Lord will end and Lord will come out of the temple for the first time in past four months. This day denotes start of Utsava (Pete Savari) of lord for the year). Out of five days last three days being Keredeepotsava (Chaturdashi) Lakshyadeepotsava (on full moon day of Kartika month in Kannada Kartika Hunnime or Karthik Poornima or Karthi-Punnav) and last day Okali (Holi) attract many people to the temple.

=== Muslims Eid-al-Fitr ===
Muslims Eid-al-Fitr (end of Ramadan) Eid-al-Adha, Day of Ashura / Muharram, Milad un Nabi Muslims celebrate Uroos in the Dargas every year.

=== Nudisiri ===
Alvas Foundation used to organise annual literary and cultural meets called Alvas Nudisiri and Alvas Viarasat every year. In the year 2019 it was not conducted owing to floods at various places of Karnataka State.

== Education ==
Alva's Education Foundation is also known to hold events which attracts participants from all-over Karnataka, it has held annual fest in the form of Alvas Virasath (College Fest) & Alvas Nudisiri (Event for enrichment of Kannada Language).

== History ==
Moodabidri was ruled by the Jain Chowta dynasty 1603, who moved their capital to Moodabidri in 1603. They lost power when the region was taken over by Tipu Sultan They continued symbolic rituals after the British defeated Tipu Sultan. The last coronation at Moodabidri was done in 1865 according to a Pattavali.

There are 18 lakes, 18 Jaina Basadis, 18 temples, and 18 roads connecting various villages in Moodbidri.

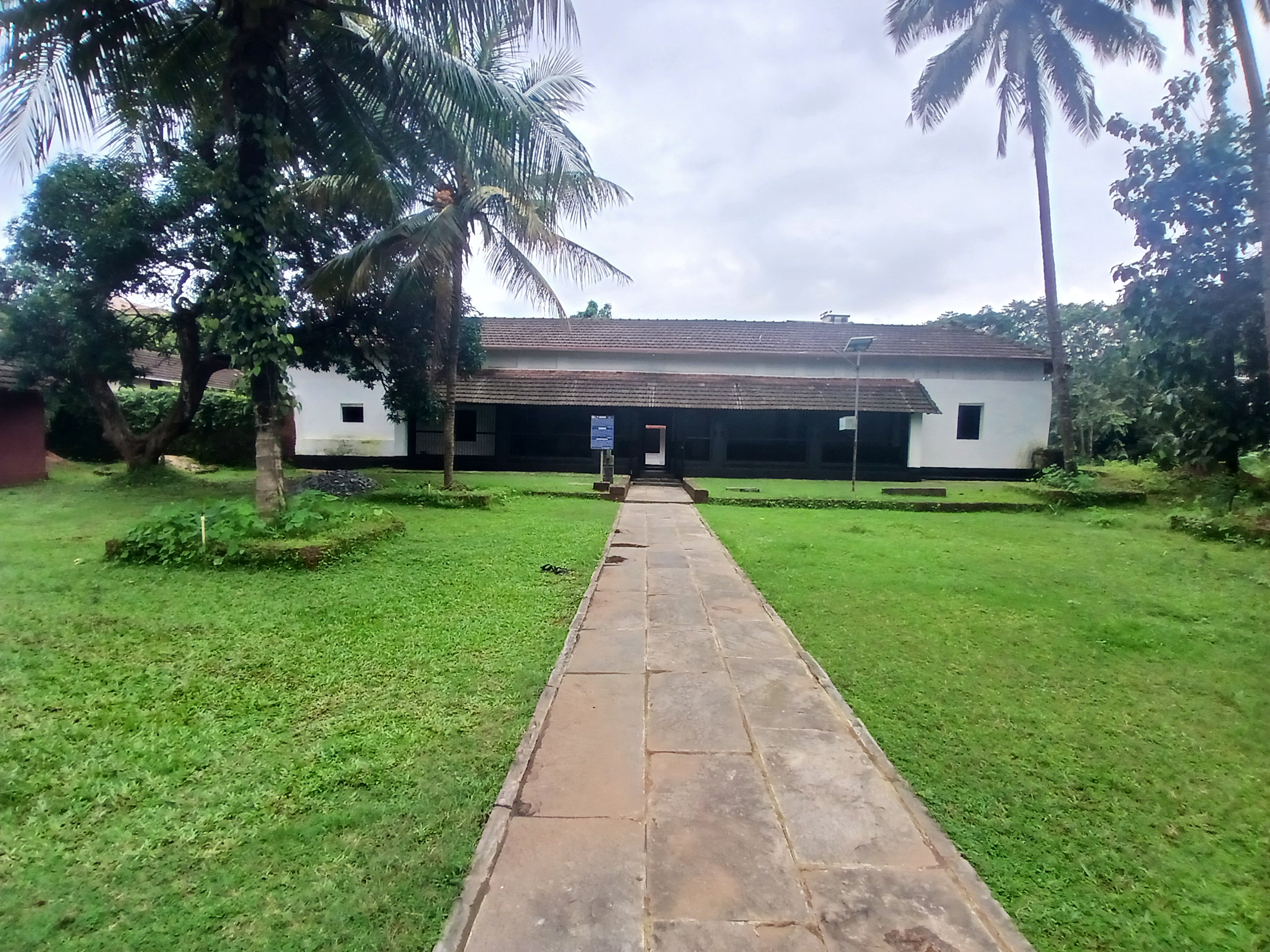
Chowta Palace (Chowta Aramane)

During 14th–16th centuries this town emerged as a center of Jain religion, culture, art and architecture. 18 Jain temples, known as Basadis, were constructed during this period. The Jain Math at Moodabidri is headed by a Bhattaraka belonging to the Mula Sangh order.

The most famous among them are Guru basadi, Tribhuvana Tilaka Chudamani Basadi (known as "Thousand Pillar Temple") and Ammanavara Basadi.

- Guru basadi is the earliest of the Jain monuments. A stone idol of Parshwanatha, about 3.5 metres tall, is installed in the sanctum of this basadi. Here the rare Jain palm leaf manuscripts of 12th century A.D. known as ‘Dhavala texts’ are preserved.
- Saavira Kambada Basadi basadi is the largest and the most ornate of the Jain temples of this region. People also call this temple Thousand Pillared Temple or Tribhuvana Tilaka Chudamani. This is a large granite temple built in 1430 A.D. The 2.5 metres tall bronze image of Lord Chandranatha Swami in the sanctum of this basadi is considered to be very sacred. This three-storey construction was supported by the rulers, the Jain Bhattaraka Swamiji, merchants and the common people. The temple has an open pillared hall in front, consisting of a large variety of ornate pillars decorated with carvings typical of Vijayanagara style. A 15-meter tall single stone pillar called manastambha stands in front of the basadi.
- Ratnakara Varni, the medieval Kannada author of Bharatesha Vaibhava belonged to this place. The Jain canonical texts known as Dhavala texts and also a number of palm leaf manuscripts of historical and literacy value are preserved in the Jain Math (monastery).

Moodabidri was the seat of the Chowtas, a Jain ruling family, who were originally located at Puthige, about 5 km from here. They moved their capital to Moodabidri in the 17th century. The remains of the 17th century Chowta Palace is known for its carved wooden pillars and ceilings.

- Gowri Temple in the heart of the city is said to have been built in the seventh century.
- Hanuman Temple in the heart of the city is the most famous temple around Moodbidri.

== Industries ==
Small-scale industries employ many local people. Some of the popular cashew industries and coconut oil mills from Coastal Karnataka are based here. Prakash Mills, a popular coconut and sesame oil mill is based in Moodabidri.

Kadale Kere is the industrial area where many small-scale industries are situated.

== Transport facilities ==
=== Long distance travel and local transport ===
The local and long-distance transport includes the buses which ply regularly. Shuttle and express buses to Mangalore, Udupi, Karkala, Hebri, Shimoga, Kudremukh, Sringeri, Dharmastala, Bantwal, Belthangady, Naravi, Kinnigoli and Mulki run every five to ten minutes.

There are government buses to distant places like Bangalore, Mysore, Hubli, Dharwad, Subramanya, Chickmagalur and all the important places of Karnataka. Private buses from Moodabidri are also available to Bombay, Goa and Bangalore by established travels like Navami, Nishmitha, Sugama, Vishal, Ideal and Anand.

== Entertainment ==
Other entertainment is watching Yakshagana, unique to this district. This includes a drama like play on epics, which lasts a whole night, starting at 9:30 pm and ending at 6 am next day. This is played normally once a week, and only in few months a year.

Some private Tulu drama companies play comedy drama at regular intervals between November and June.

== Notable people ==
- Srinivasa Gowda (born 1991), Kambala jockey

== Climate ==
Climate data for Moodabidri, India
Month	Jan	Feb	Mar	Apr	May	Jun	Jul	Aug	Sep	Oct	Nov	Dec	Year
Mean daily maximum °C (°F)	31.2 (88.2)	31.4 (88.5)	32.4 (90.3)	32.8 (91.0)	32.4 (90.3)	32.2 (90.0)	29.2 (84.6)	27.8 (82.0)	28.5 (83.3)	29.7 (85.5)	30.8 (87.4)	31.3 (88.3)	30.8 (87.4)
Daily mean °C (°F)	25.8 (78.4)	26.4 (79.5)	27.9 (82.2)	28.9 (84.0)	28.6 (83.5)	26.3 (79.3)	25.3 (77.5)	25.5 (77.9)	25.6 (78.1)	26.3 (79.3)	26.4 (79.5)	26.0 (78.8)	26.6 (79.8)
Mean daily minimum °C (°F)	20.5 (68.9)	21.5 (70.7)	23.4 (74.1)	25.1 (77.2)	25.1 (77.2)	23.4 (74.1)	22.9 (73.2)	23.0 (73.4)	22.8 (73.0)	23.0 (73.4)	22.1 (71.8)	20.8 (69.4)	22.8 (73.0)
Average rainfall mm (inches)	1 (0.0)	0 (0)	5 (0.2)	46 (1.8)	204 (8.0)	1,048 (41.3)	1,511 (59.5)	933 (36.7)	422 (16.6)	260 (10.2)	80 (3.1)	20 (0.8)	4,530 (178.2)
Source: Climate-Data.org - Climate Table of Moodabidri, Karnataka, India

== Photo gallery ==
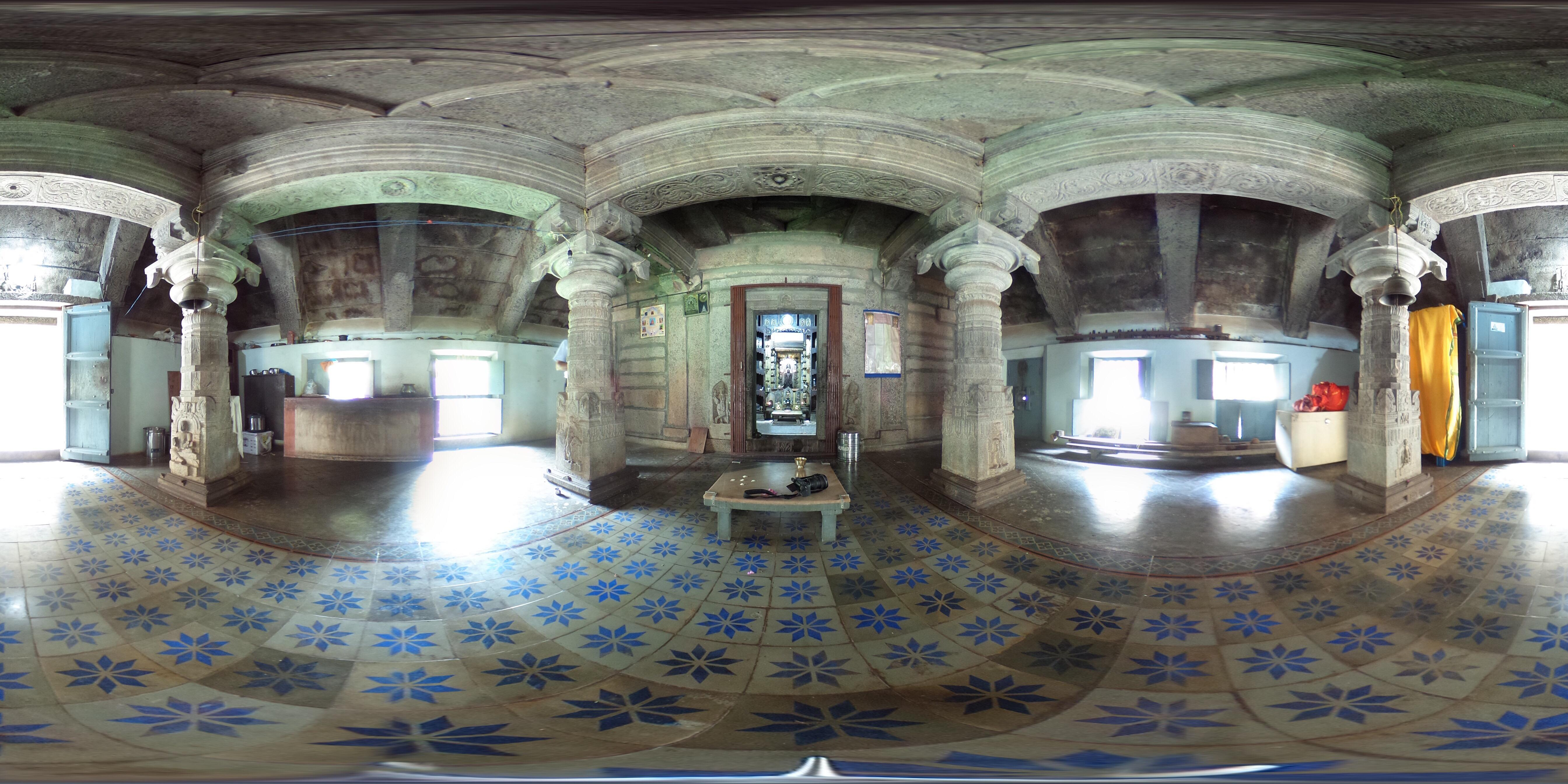
Jain Temple moodabidri

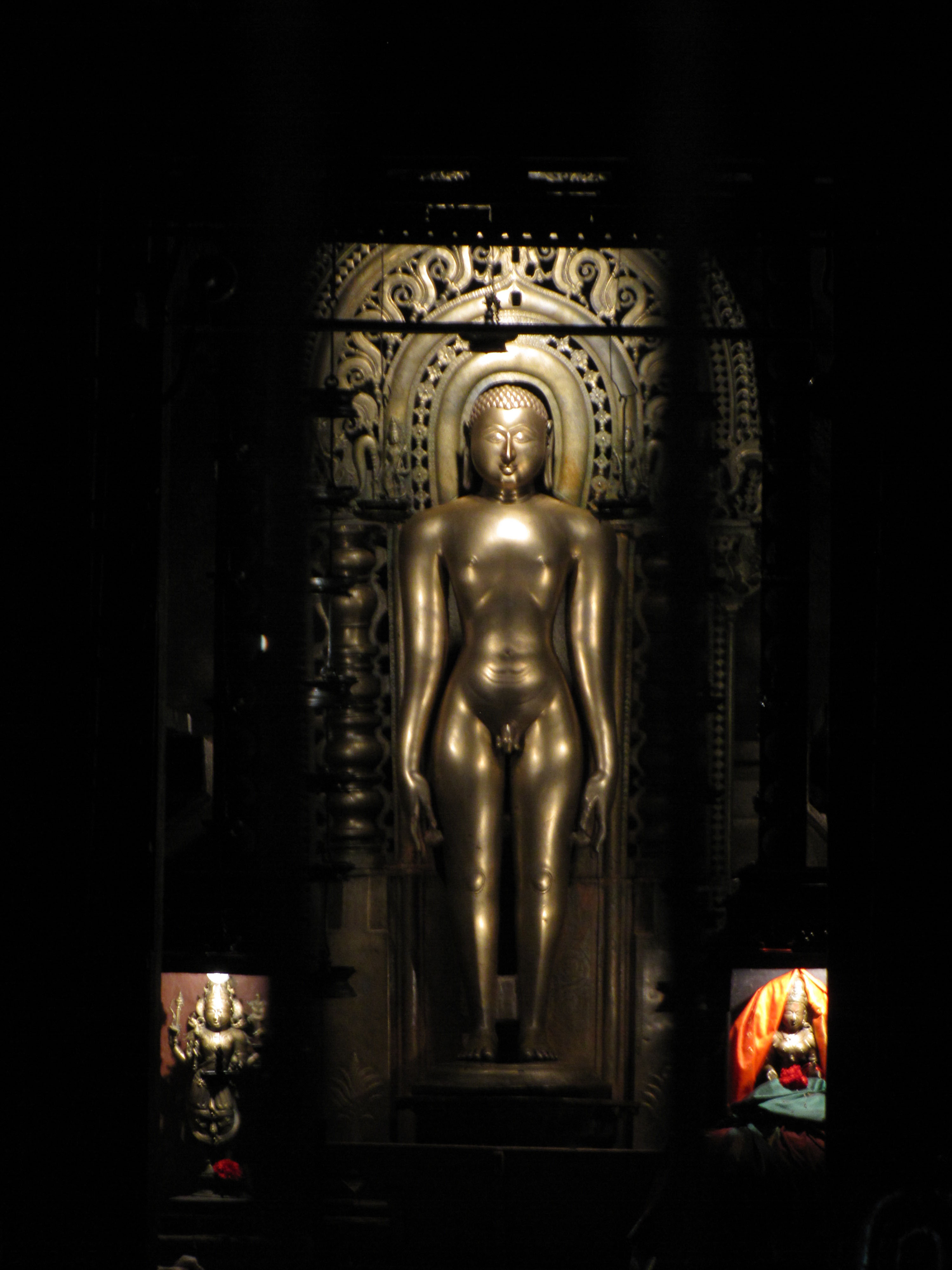
Idol of Chandraprabha at Saavira Kambada Basadi

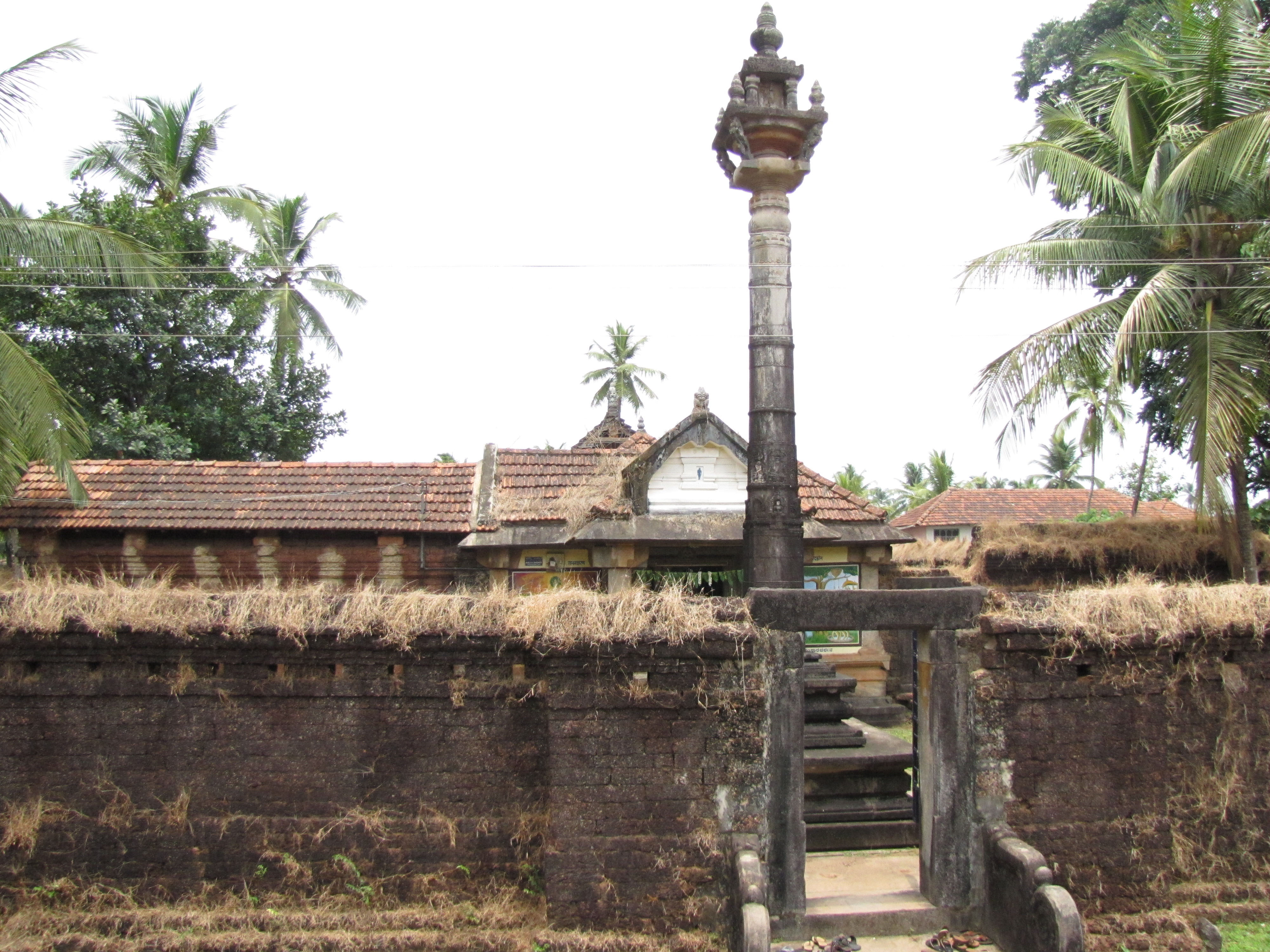
Kallu Basadi, Moodbidri

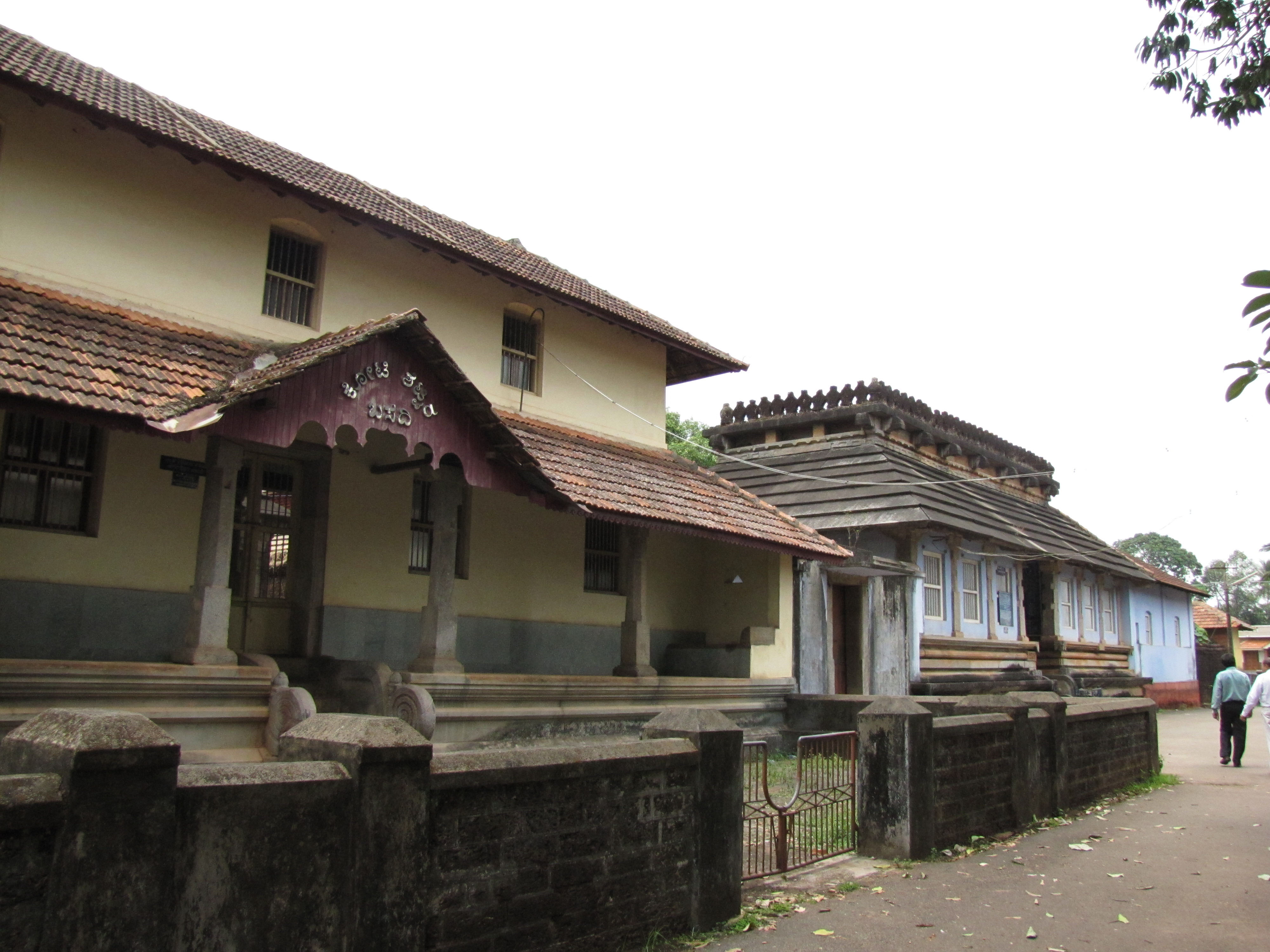
Koti Basadi and Guru Basadi, Moodbidri

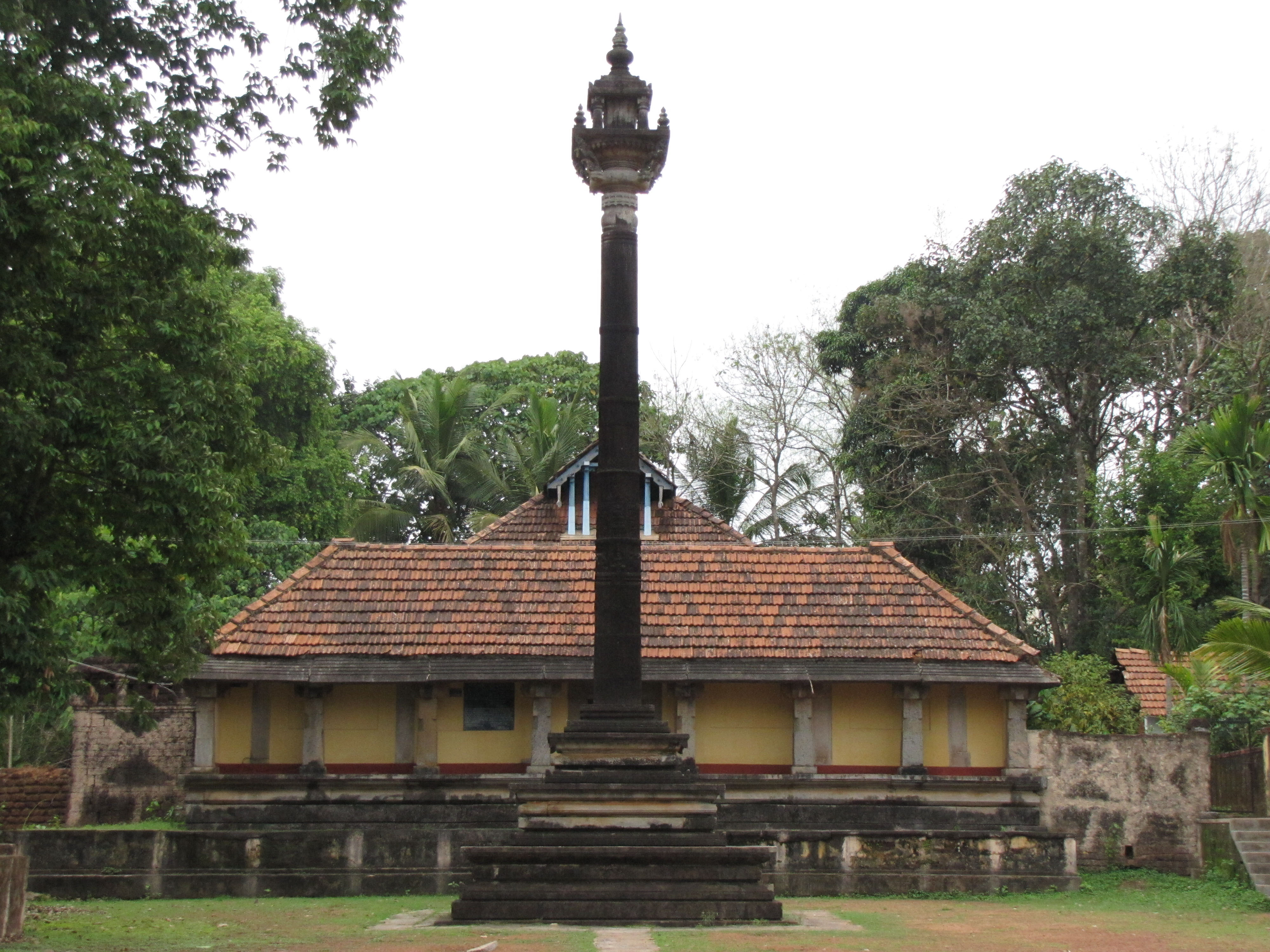
Leppada Basadi, Moodbidri

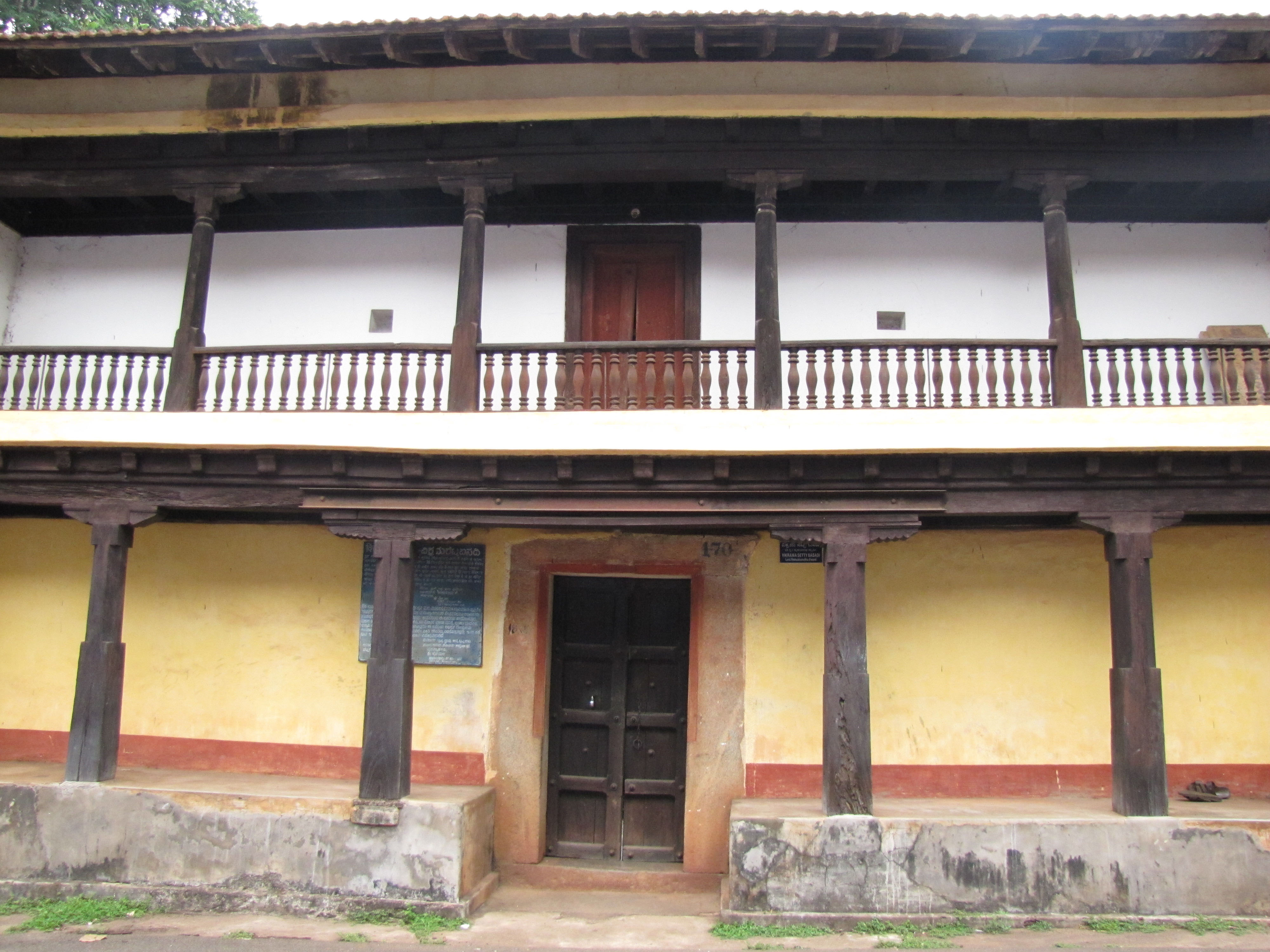
Vikram Setty Basadi, Moodbidri

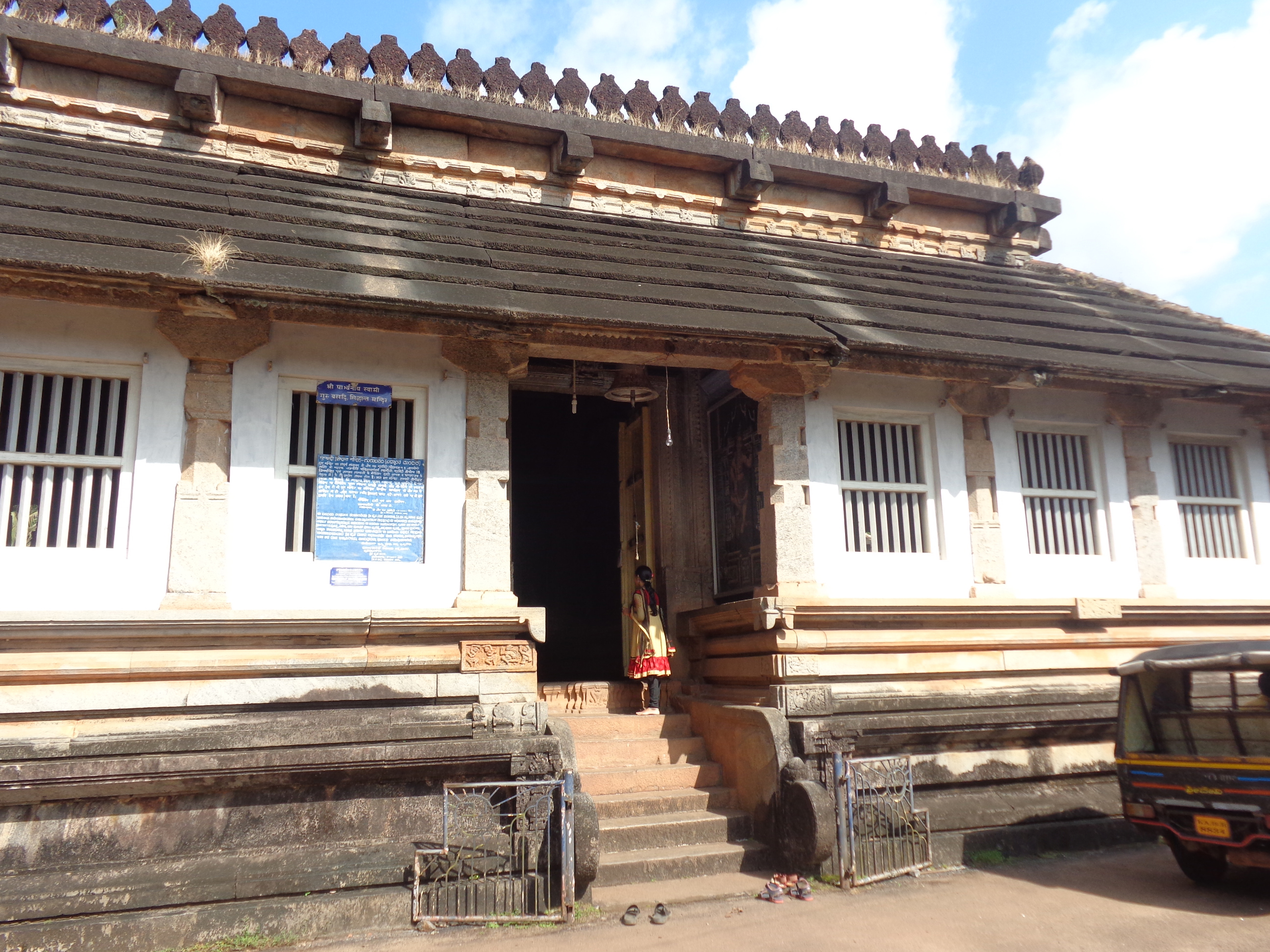
Guru basadi

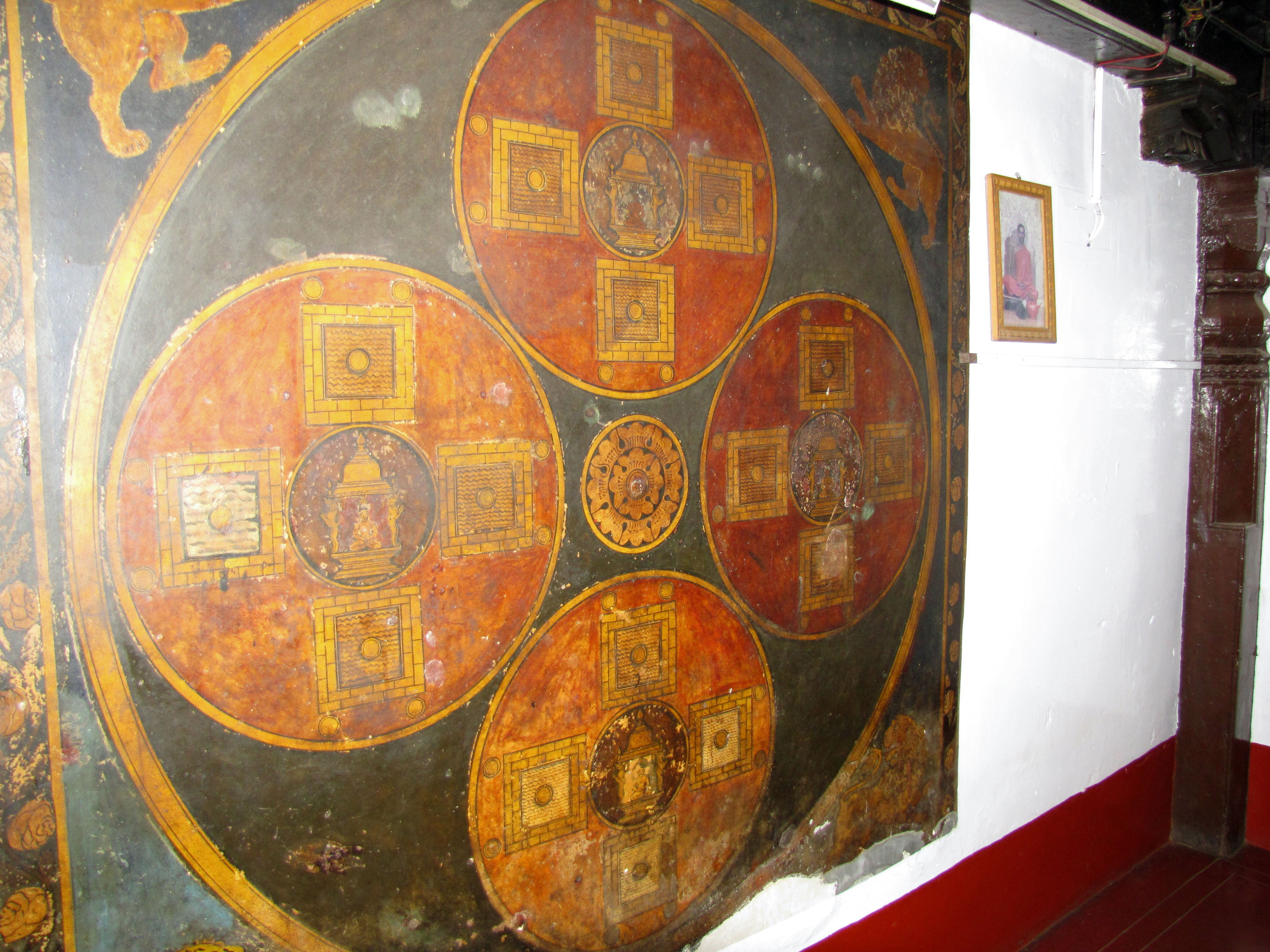
Nandeesware Dweepa painting within a Jain temple, Moodbidri

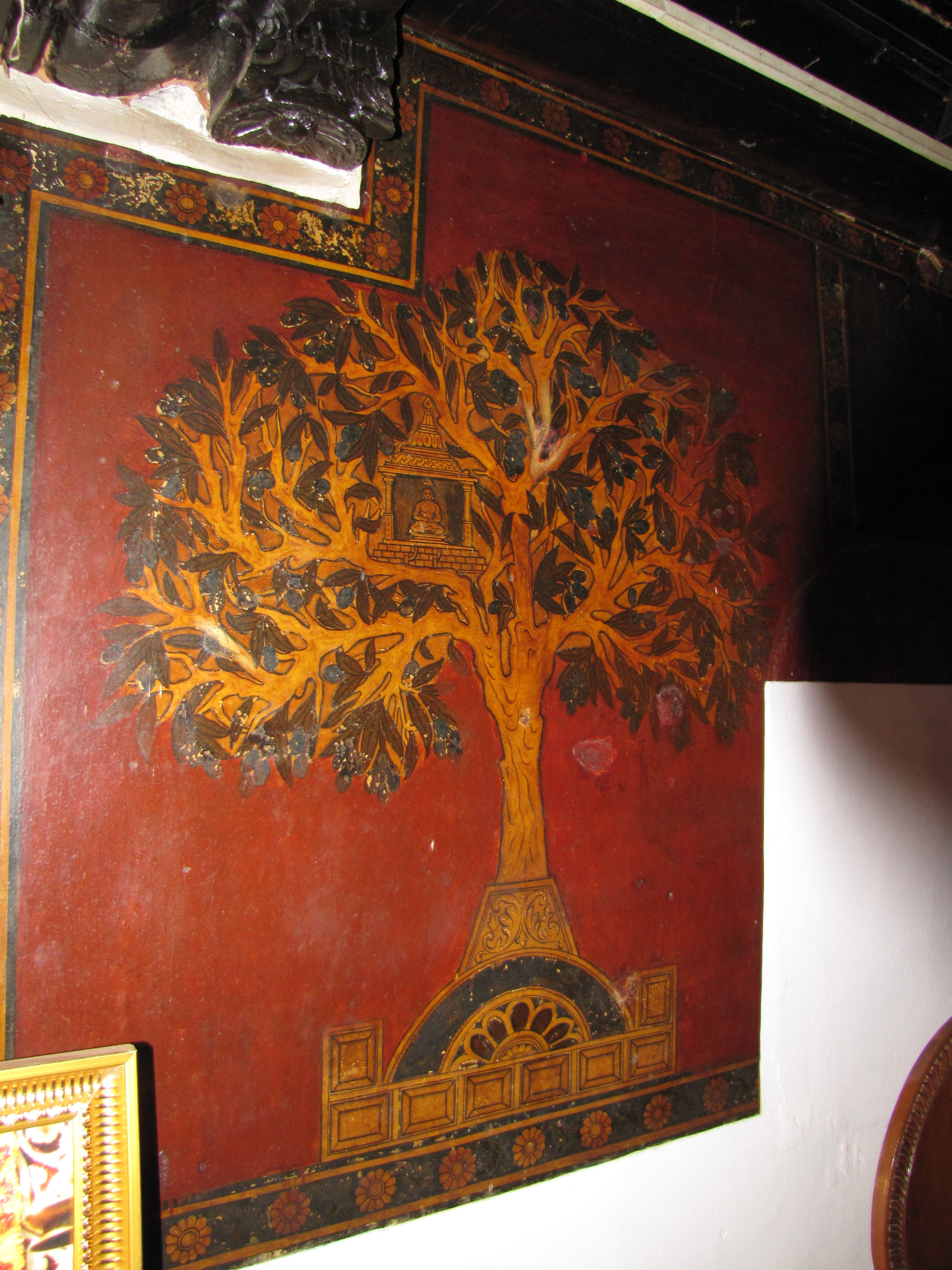
Kalpavruksha painting within a Jain temple, Moodbidri

== See also ==
- Belthangady
- Dharmasthala
- Kodangallu
- Siddakatte
