= Mangalorean Catholics =

Latin Christian ethno-religious community in India

Mangalorean Catholics Kōdiyālcheñ Kathōlikā
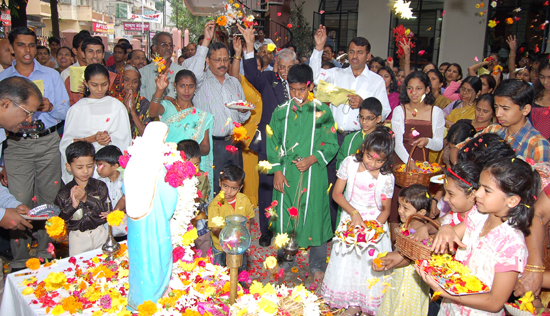
- Mangaloreans partaking in the occasion of Monti Fest at Poona (Pune).

Regions with significant populations
- Diocese of Mangalore: 360,000
- Diocese of Udupi: 106,000 (approx)

Languages
- Konkani, Tulu, Kanarese, Hindi-Urdu, Indian English & Bombay Mahratti. Previously: Goan Portuguese.

Religion
- Latin Church in India

Related ethnic groups
- Kudali Catholics, Goan Catholics, Karwari Catholics, Bombay East Indian Catholics, Damanese Catholics, Mangalorean Protestants, Latin Catholics of Malabar, Koli Christians, Kunbis, Gaodi Christians, Christian Brahmins, Christian Cxatrias, Daivadnyas, Vaishya Vanis, Anglo-Indians & Luso-Indians

Mangalorean Catholics (Konkani: Kōdiyālcheñ Kathōlikā) are an ethno-religious community of Latin Christians from the Diocese of Mangalore and the erstwhile South Canara area; by the southern coast of present-day Karnataka, India.

Contemporary Mangalorean Catholics descend mainly from the New Christians of Portuguese Goa, who migrated to the Keladi Kingdom 1560-1763, throughout the courses of the Goan Inquisition, the Portuguese–Adil Shahi Wars & the Mahratta Invasions of Goa and Bombay. They learned Tulu and Kanarese whilst in Canara, but retained the Konkani language and preserved much of their Konkani way of life, which had undergone Christianisation in Goa. The "Canara Christians" suffered a 15-year-long captivity at Seringapatam, that was imposed by Tippu Sultan. Following Tippu's defeat and death at the Siege of Seringapatam (1799) by the English East India Company, the Nizam of Hyderabad & other allies; most of them resettled in and around South Canara; also in areas such as Chikmagalur (Chickmangalore) & Coorg (Kodagu) during the Company rule in India. A lesser number was shipped to the Seven Islands of Bombay & the Bombay metropolitan area in the northern Konkan region.

Historically, an agrarian community, there were migrations of the working and educated class in the early 20th century, to bigger cities such as the Bombay (Mumbai), Poona (Pune) & Bangalore (Bengaluru). Later, more migrations led to the formation of a Mangalorean diaspora in the Persian Gulf countries and the Anglosphere; thus the younger generation outside of historical locales of South Canara, is mostly an English-speaking Anglo-Americanised sub-culture. Also, intermarriages with non-Mangaloreans has caused a decline in "Mangalore stores" and the culture of Mangalorean Catholic cuisine.

== Ethnic identity ==
The community gets its name from the Mamgalore diocesan adherents of the Latin Church in India, located by the southwestern coast of India. Most of their hometowns lie in present day civil districts of Dakshina Kannada and Udupi districts in Karnataka state and Kassergode in the present-day Kerala state. This area was collectively referred to as South Canara in British India, and then from the partition until the reorganisation (1956) of the states and territories of India.

In 1526, Portuguese in Goa and Bombay arrived in Mangalore, and the number of local converts to Christianity slowly increased. However, a sizeable Christian population did not exist there until the second half of the 16th century, when there was a large-scale immigration of Christians from Goa to South Canara. They were reluctant to learn the local languages of South Canara and continued to speak Konkani, so that local Christians (Padvals) had to learn Konkani to converse with them. After this migration, these skilled agriculturists were offered various land grants by the native Bednore rulers of South Canara. They observed their Eastern cultural Hindu customs in conjunction with the newfound Western Catholic faith, and preserved their much of their Konkani lifestyle.

Most migrants were people from the lower economic strata who had been left out of government and economic jobs; their lands had been confiscated due to heavy taxation under the Portuguese in Goa. As a consequence of the wealth and privileges which these migrants enjoyed in Mangalore, they began feeling superior to their landless kindred in Goa. Their captivity at Seringapatam (1784–1799), where many died, were killed, or were converted to Sunni Islam, led to the formation of a separate and common cultural identity among members of the group, who had previously considered themselves an extension of Goans. They no longer self-identified as Goan Catholics after the captivity. Alan Machado Prabhu estimates that almost 95 per cent of Mangalorean Catholics have origins in Goa.

== History ==
=== Pre-migration era ===
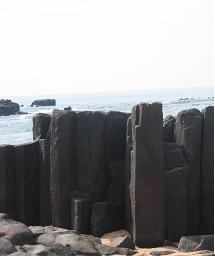
St Mary's Islands in Udupi, where the Portuguese explorer Vasco da Gama landed in 1498

All records of an early existence of Christians in South Canara were lost at the time of their deportation by Tipu Sultan in 1784. Hence, it is not known exactly when Christianity was introduced in South Canara, although it is possible that Syrian Christians settled in South Canara, just as they did in Kerala, a state just south of Canara. The Italian traveller Marco Polo recorded that there were considerable trading activities between the Red Sea and the Canara coast in the 13th century. It can be surmised that foreign Christian merchants were visiting the coastal towns of South Canara during that period for commerce; it is possible some Christian priests might have accompanied them for evangelistic work.

In April 1321 the French Dominican friar Jordanus Catalani of Severac (in south-western France) landed at Thana with four other friars. He then travelled to Bhatkal in North Canara, a port town on the coastal route from Thana to Quilon. Being the first bishop of India and the Quilon Diocese, he was entrusted the spiritual nourishment of Christian community in Mangalore and other parts of India by Pope John XXII. According to historian Severine Silva, no concrete evidence has yet been found that there were any permanent settlements of Christians in South Canara before the 16th century. It was only after the advent of the Portuguese in the region that Christianity began to spread.

In 1498 the Portuguese explorer Vasco da Gama landed on a group of islands in South Canara on his voyage from Portugal to India. He named the islands El Padron de Santa Maria; they later came to be known as St Mary's Islands. In 1500, Portuguese explorer Pedro Álvares Cabral arrived at Anjediva in North Canara with eight Franciscan missionaries. Under the leadership of Frei Henrique Soares de Coimbra, the missionaries converted 22 or 23 natives to Christianity in the Mangalore region. During the early part of the 16th century, Krishnadevaraya (1509–1529), the ruler of the Vijayanagara Empire of Deccan, granted commercial privileges to the Portuguese on the Canara coast. There was complete freedom of worship, belief, and propagation of religious tenets in the Vijaynagara Empire. In 1526, under the viceroyship of Lopo Vaz de Sampaio, the Portuguese took possession of Mangalore.

The Portuguese Franciscans slowly started propagating Christianity in Mangalore. The most prominent local convert was the Brahmin mahant Shankarayya, who in 1751 travelled with his wife from Kallianpur to Goa and was baptised, with the Portuguese viceroy assuming the role of his godfather. The honoured mahant took the name of Francisco de Távora, after the Viceroy Marques de Távora. Their properties were subsequently taken over by their Hindu relatives, but the viceroy instructed his factor of Mangalore to get their property restored. In 1534, Canara was placed under the ecclesiastic jurisdiction of the Bishop of Goa, where the Portuguese had a strong presence. Missionaries soon arrived and gained converts. The number of local converts in South Canara continually increased until 1546. During the mid-16th century, the Portuguese faced resistance from Abbakka Rani of Ullal, the Queen of the Bednore dynasty. This put a halt to conversions. The first battle between Abbakka Rani and the Portuguese was fought in 1546; she emerged victorious and drove the Portuguese out of South Canara.

=== Migration era ===
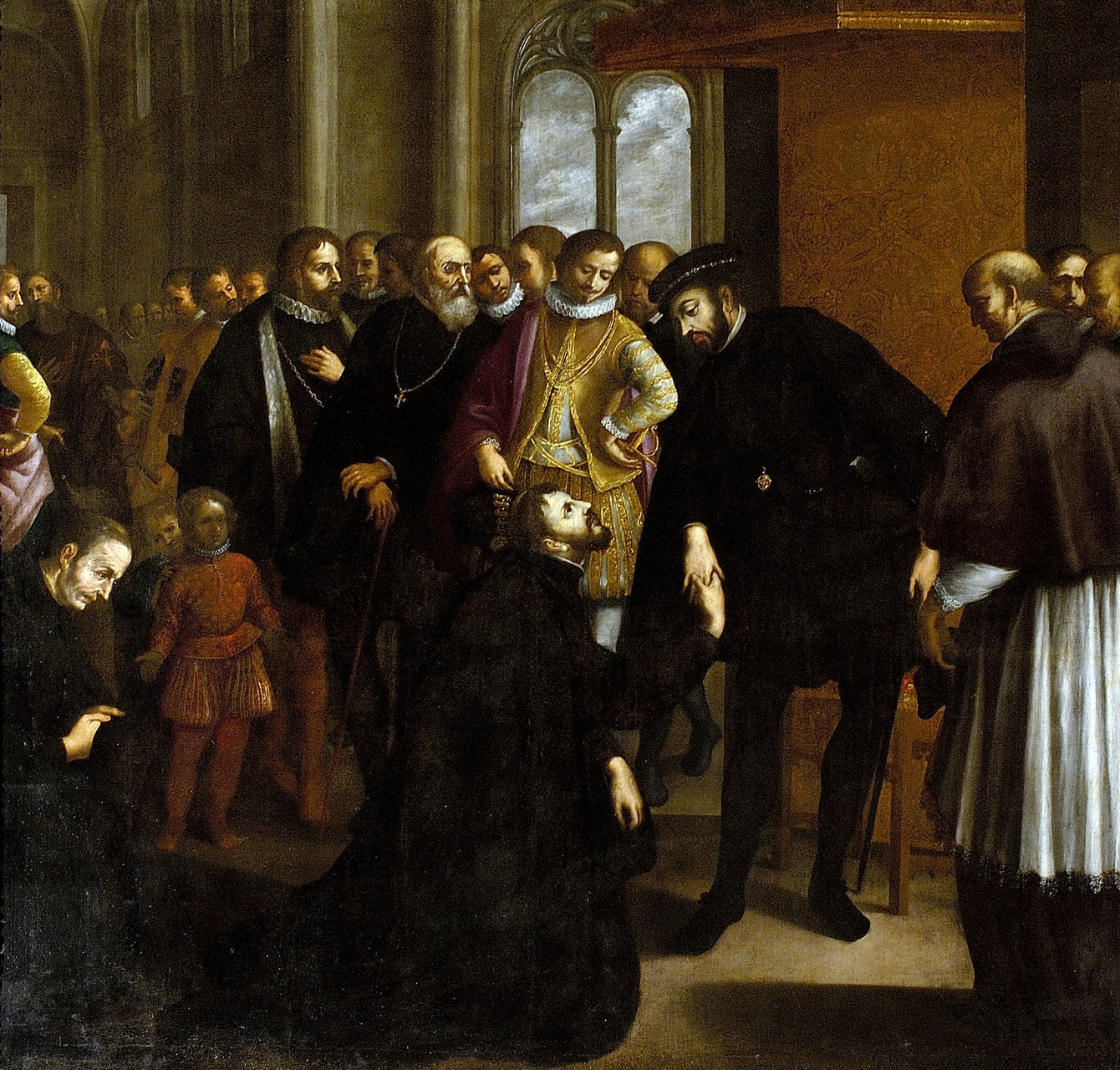
Jesuit missionary Francis Xavier taking leave of John III of Portugal before his departure to Goa in 1541, by Avelar Rebelo (1635).

In 1510, a Portuguese fleet under Afonso de Albuquerque, sent by King Manuel I of Portugal, wrested the region of Goa from Sultan Yusuf Adil Shah of Bijapur. In 1534, the Diocese of Goa was established. Soon missionaries were sent to Goa, which led to conversion of a sizeable population to Roman Catholicism. The bulk of Christian settlers came in three major migration waves towards South Canara. These migrations occurred in periods of great unrest: the Goa Inquisition occurred from 1560 onwards; the Portuguese–Adil Shahi wars were between 1570 and 1579; and the Portuguese–Maratha wars occurred between 1667–83 and 1737–40. Other factors that led to mass migrations were disease epidemics, famines, natural calamities, overpopulation, poor living conditions, heavy tax burdens, and social discrimination by the Portuguese.

In 1542, the Navarrese Jesuit Francis Xavier, co-founder of the Society of Jesus; arrived in Goa. He discovered that the newly converted Christians were practising their old Hindu customs and traditions. He requested the Portuguese king João III to install an Inquisition in Goa in 1545. Many of the Goan ancestors of the present Mangalorean Catholics fled Goa after the Inquisition began in 1560. King Sebastião I decreed that every trace of Hindu customs should be eradicated through the Inquisition. Many Goan Christians of upper-caste Hindu origins were attached to their caste practices, and did not want to abandon them. Those converts who refused to comply were forced to leave Goa and to settle outside the Portuguese dominion, which resulted in the first major wave of migrations towards South Canara.

The Christians who left Goa were for the most part skilled agriculturists who abandoned their irrigated fields in Goa to achieve freedom. The remainder were skilled carpenters, goldsmiths, artisans, and merchants. At the time of migration, Canara was ruled by the Keladi king Shivappa Nayaka (1540–60). He evinced great interest in the development of agriculture in his empire and welcomed these agriculturists to his kingdom, giving them fertile lands to cultivate. They were recruited into the armies of the Bednore dynasty.^{[a]} This was confirmed by Francis Buchanan, a Scottish physician, when he visited Canara in 1801. In his book A Journey from Madras through the Countries of Mysore, Canara and Malabar (1807), he stated that "The princes of the house of Ikkeri had given great encouragement to the Christians, and had induced 80,000 of them to settle in Tuluva." Later, this was identified as a probable mistake and should have read "8,000". This figure included the second emigration of Christians from Goa. The taxation policies of the Keladi Nayakas during 1598–1763 enabled the Goan Catholic migrants to emerge as prominent landowning gentry in South Canara. These migrants usually brought their own capital from Goa, which they invested in their new lands, thereby indirectly contributing to the prosperity of the Keladi kingdom.

Under the provisional treaties between the Portuguese and the Bednore rulers, and the Padroado, the Christians were allowed to build churches and help foster the growth of Christianity in South Canara. The arrival of the British and the Dutch halted the activity of the Portuguese, and they were gradually unable to send the required number of missionaries to Mangalore. Shivappa Nayaka had previously expelled the Portuguese from their forts a little before 1660, which brought about considerable changes in the ecclesiastical situation. The appointment of the Vicar Apostolic of Mangalore was felt by the Holy See to be of critical importance. Nayaka pressured the church authorities to appoint a native priest as the Vicar Apostolic, which resulted in the appointment of Fr. Andrew Gomez to the post; however, he died before the nomination papers could reach Mangalore.

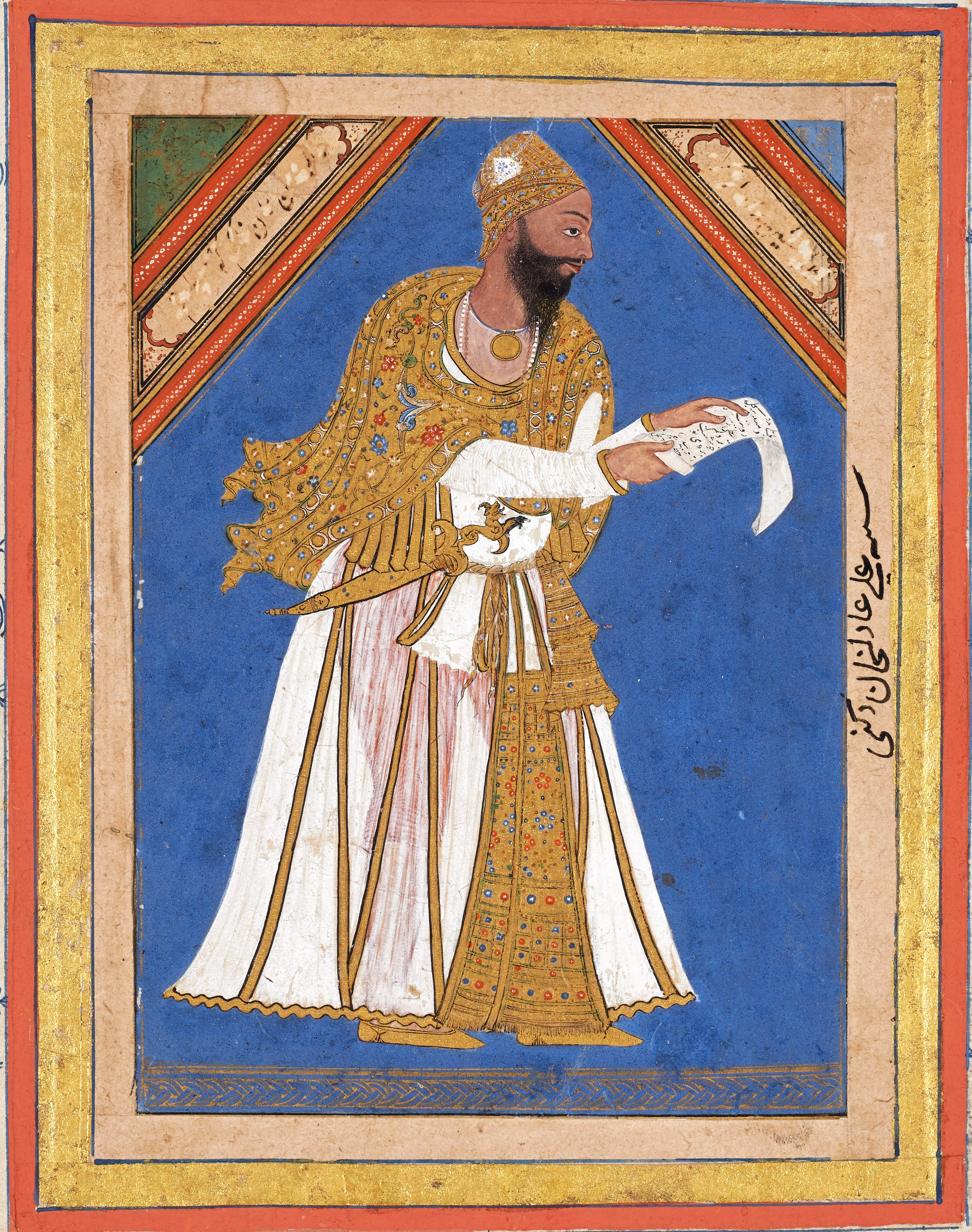
Ali Adil Shah I's attack on Goa in 1571 precipitated the second wave of Goan Catholic migrations towards South Canara.

At the recommendation of the Vicar General of Verapoly, Mons. Joseph Sebastiani, Pope Clement X appointed Bishop Thomas de Castro, a Goan Theatine and Bishop of Fulsivelem, as the Vicar Apostolic of Propaganda Fide in the Vicariate of Canara on 30 August 1675, for the purpose of providing spiritual leadership to the Canara Christians. After his consecration, he first went to Calicut and then moved to Mangalore, where he served from 1677 to 1684. In 1677, Bishop de Castro entered into a conflict with the Archbishop of Goa, Dom Frei António Brandão for disregarding the Padroado. Consequently, they did not cede the jurisdiction to him despite the Pope's letter of appointment. The Padroado–Propaganda conflict which ensued divided the Catholics of Canara into two sides—those who recognised the authority of the Padroado Archbishop in Goa versus those who supported de Castro.

The Portuguese refused to recognise Bishop de Castro's appointment and vigorously opposed his activities. Archbishop Brandão's sudden death on 6 July 1678 further complicated matters, and the Cathedral chapter administering the Archdiocese of Goa following the vacancy created by his death, forbade the Canara Catholics from receiving the sacraments from the bishop or from priests appointed by him. In his turn, Bishop de Castro excommunicated those Catholics who were obedient to the Padroado authorities in Goa and their priests. In 1681, the Holy See appointed another Goan priest Fr. Joseph Vaz, as the Vicar Forane of Canara; he was asked not to submit to Bishop de Castro unless he showed the letter of appointment. However, after being convinced of its legitimacy, Fr. Vaz submitted to Bishop de Castro and brought about a truce. He further managed to persuade the bishop to delegate his jurisdiction to him while retaining the post. In 1700, the Catholics of Canara were again brought under the jurisdiction of the Padroado Archbishop of Goa.

The Milagres Church, one of the oldest churches in South Canara, was built in 1680 by Bishop Thomas de Castro. In 1568, the Church of Nossa Senhora do Rosário de Mangalore (Our Lady of Rosary of Mangalore) was erected by the Portuguese at Bolar in Mangalore. The Churches of Nossa Senhora de Mercês de Velala (Our Lady of Mercy of Ullal) and São Francisco de Assis (St. Francis of Assisi) at Farangipet were erected by the Portuguese in South Canara at around the same time. These three churches were mentioned by the Italian traveller Pietro Della Valle, who visited Mangalore in 1623.

In 1570, the Sultan of Bijapur, Ali Adil Shah I, entered into an alliance with the Sultan of Ahmadnagar, Murtaza Nizam Shah, and the Zamorin of Calicut for a simultaneous attack on the Portuguese territories of Goa, Chaul, and Mangalore. He attacked Goa in 1571 and ended Portuguese influence in the region. The Bijapur Sultans were especially renowned for their loathing of Christianity. Fearing persecution, many Goan Catholics fled to South Canara during this second wave of migrations, and settled in Barcoor, Kallianpur, Cundapore, and Basroor. For the next century, there was continual migration of Goan Catholics southwards, so that by 1650, a considerable number of Catholics were settled around Mangalore, Moolki, Shirva, Pezar, Bantval, Cundapore, Kallianpur, and Kirem. The Christian Goud Saraswat Brahmins who came during this wave belonged mostly to the Shenvi subcaste.

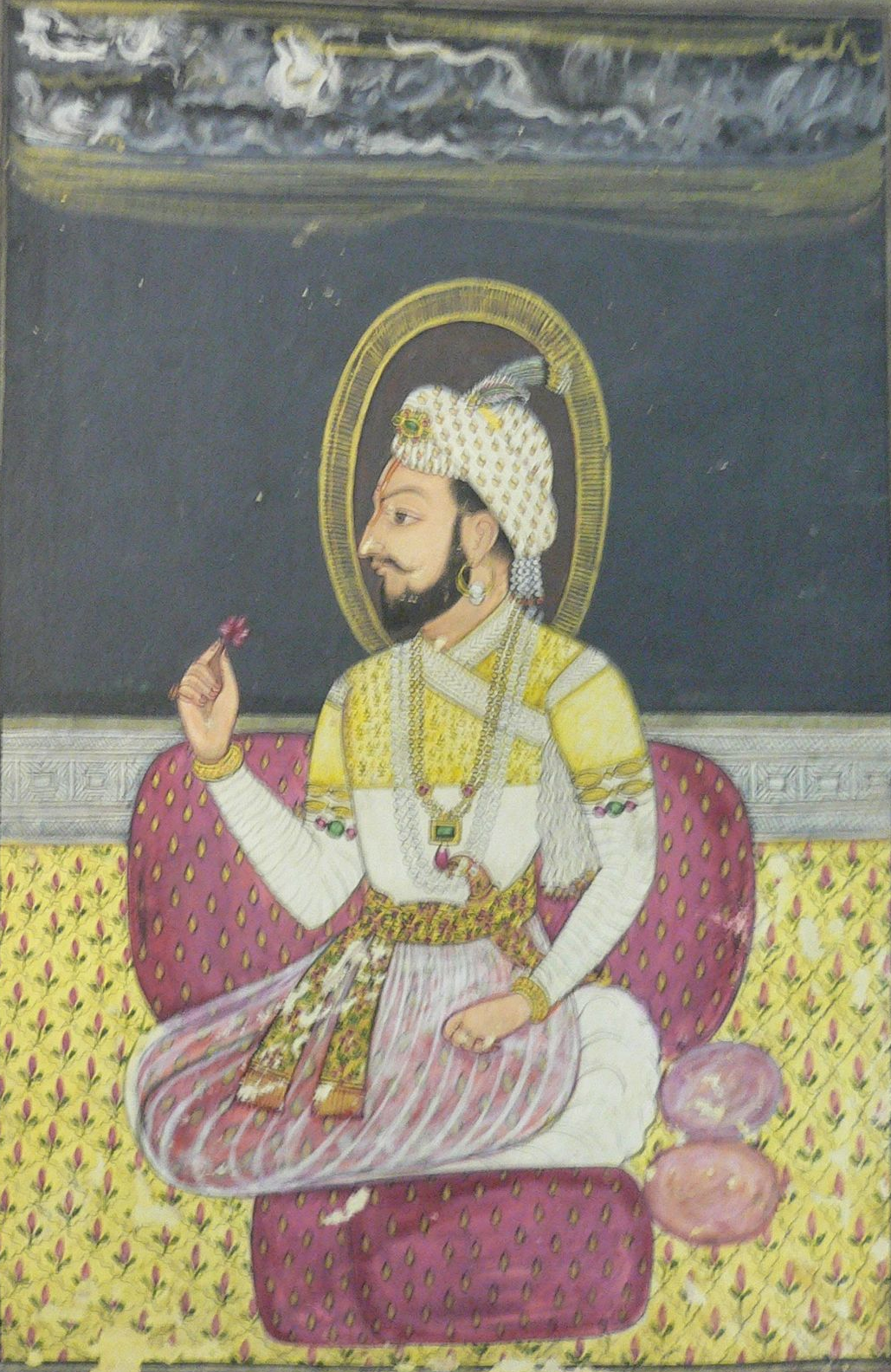
The Maratha ruler Sambhaji's onslaught was responsible for the third and final great wave of migrations to South Canara.

The attacks of the Maratha Empire on Goa during the mid-17th century precipitated the third major wave of migrations. In 1664 Shivaji, the founder of the Maratha empire, attacked Kudal, a town north of Goa, and began his campaign for Goa. After Shivaji's death on 3 April 1680, his son Sambhaji ascended to the throne. The onslaught of Sambhaji along the northern territories of Goa drove nearly all the Christians from their homelands, and most of them migrated to South Canara. Migration increased with the fall of the Portuguese "Province of the North" (which included Bassein, Chaul and Salsette) and a direct threat to the very existence of Goa in 1738–40.

According to one estimate, emigrations from the Salcete district of Goa were around the rate of 2,000 annually. Jesuit priests estimated that 12,000 Christians emigrated from the Bardez district of Goa between 1710 and 1712, most of them going southward. A Goa government report of 1747 presently in the Panjim archives records that around 5,000 Christians fled from the Bardez and Tiswadi districts of Goa during the Maratha invasion. During the Maratha raids on Goa, about 60,000 Christians migrated to South Canara. These new migrants were given lands at Shirva, Kirem, Mundkur, Pezar, and Hosabettu by the Chowta kings of Moodbidri and at Milagres, Bondel, and Cordel by the Banghel kings of Mangalore. During later years, migration slowed because of the Maratha–Mughal wars, and some 10,000 Christians returned to Goa. According to Alan Machado Prabhu, Mangalorean Catholics numbered about 58,000 by 1765.

Subsequent to this steady rise in South Canara's Catholic population, the Portuguese took advantage of every opportunity to extend their control over the Mangalorean Catholics, who came to be identified with Portuguese interests. The Portuguese sought to expand the power of the priests, as from the beginning of their empire, priests had accompanied Portuguese delegations on diplomatic missions and on occasion were the principal negotiators. Treaties they signed with the Keladi Nayakas progressively incorporated clauses which increased the authority of the priests over the local Catholic population, making them obedient to the priests in matters of Christian laws as well as granting priests the authority to punish violations. The Portuguese promised to refrain from slaughtering cows and to halt forcible conversions in their factories. The terms of these treaties were not always honoured by the Portuguese, with the result that whenever hostilities broke out between the Keladis and the Portuguese, the Catholic settlers were often harassed or arrested by the Nayakas.

=== Post-migration era and captivity ===
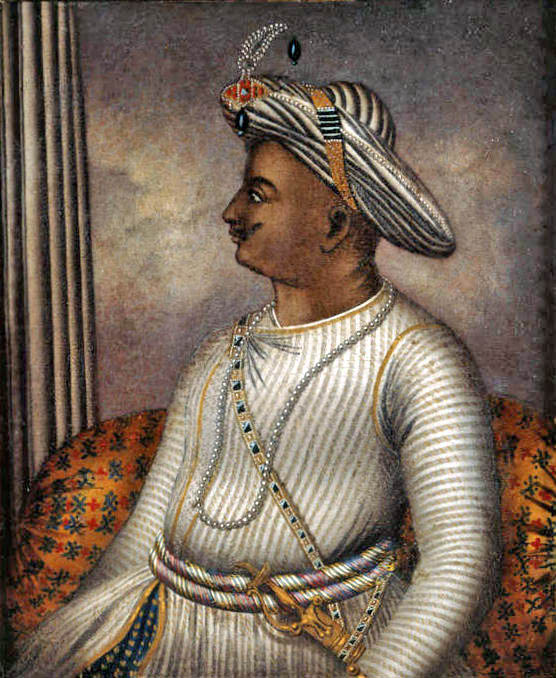
Tipu Sultan (1750–1799), the architect of the Seringapatam captivity

In 1686, Seringapatam, the capital of the Kingdom of Mysore, had a community of more than 400 Catholics. The community was severely harassed in the following two decades, with the churches destroyed and the priest's house confiscated. The destruction was undertaken under the name of the Wodeyar king, Kanthirava Narasaraja I, by his finance minister. The priest's house was returned to the church in 1709. Relations between the Wodeyars and the Mangalorean Catholics improved until 1717, when there was an anti-Christian outburst. The resident priest was expelled and forbidden to preach. Several more anti-Christian outbursts followed. By 1736, there were better relations between the two groups.

From 1761 onwards, Hyder Ali, a distinguished soldier in the Mysore army, took de facto control of the throne of the Kingdom of Mysore through the Wodeyar dynasty. Hyder occupied Mangalore in 1763. The Mangalorean Catholics numbered 80,000 in 1767. In February 1768 the British captured Mangalore from Hyder. Toward the end of 1768, Hyder and his son Tipu Sultan defeated the British and recaptured Mangalore fort. After the conquest, Hyder was informed that the Mangalorean Catholics had helped the British in their conquest of Mangalore. Hyder believed that this behaviour of the Christians amounted to treachery against the sovereign.

The Christians were alleged to have helped General Mathews with a sum of Rs. 3,30,000/-. Hyder summoned a Portuguese officer and several Christian priests from Mangalore to suggest the punishment for the Mangalorean Catholics for treachery. The Portuguese officer suggested the death penalty for those Catholics who helped the British, because it was a fitting punishment for people who betrayed the sovereign. But Hyder exhibited a diplomatic stance and imprisoned the Christians, rather than killing them.

Later, he opened negotiations with the Portuguese. As a result of the agreement, the suspicion against the clergy and the Christians was removed. During Hyder's regime, the Mangalorean Catholic community continued to flourish. After Hyder's death in the Second Anglo-Mysore War on 7 December 1782, the British captured the fort again. Hyder was succeeded by his son Tipu Sultan. Tipu laid several assaults on the Mangalore fort until January 1784, all of which resulted in failure. The fort was finally delivered to Tipu when the British capitulated on 30 January 1784.

Tipu received highly exaggerated reports about the role of the Mangalorean Catholics and their help to the British in the Second Anglo-Mysore War. To minimise the British threat to his kingdom and in the Sultan-ul-Tawarikh, due to "the rage of Islam that began to boil in his breast", Tipu banished the Mangalorean Catholic community from their lands, and imprisoned them at Seringapatam, the capital of his empire. The captivity of Mangalorean Catholics at Seringapatam, which began on 24 February 1784 and ended on 4 May 1799, remains the most disconsolate memory in their history.

Soon after the Treaty of Mangalore in 1784, Tipu gained control of Canara. He issued orders to seize the Christians in Canara, confiscate their estates, and deport them to Seringapatam, through the Jamalabad fort route. All this was accomplished in a secret and well-planned move on Ash Wednesday (24 February 1784). Accounts of the number of captives differ, ranging from 30,000 to 80,000. The generally accepted figure is 60,000, as per Tipu's own records. They were forced to climb nearly 4,000 feet (1,200 m) through the dense jungles and gorges of the Western Ghat mountain ranges along two routes; one group travelled along the Bantwal-Belthangadi-Kulshekar-Virajpet-Coorg-Mysore route, and the other along the Gersoppa falls (Shimoga) route. It was 200 miles (320 km) from Mangalore to Seringapatam, and the journey took six weeks.

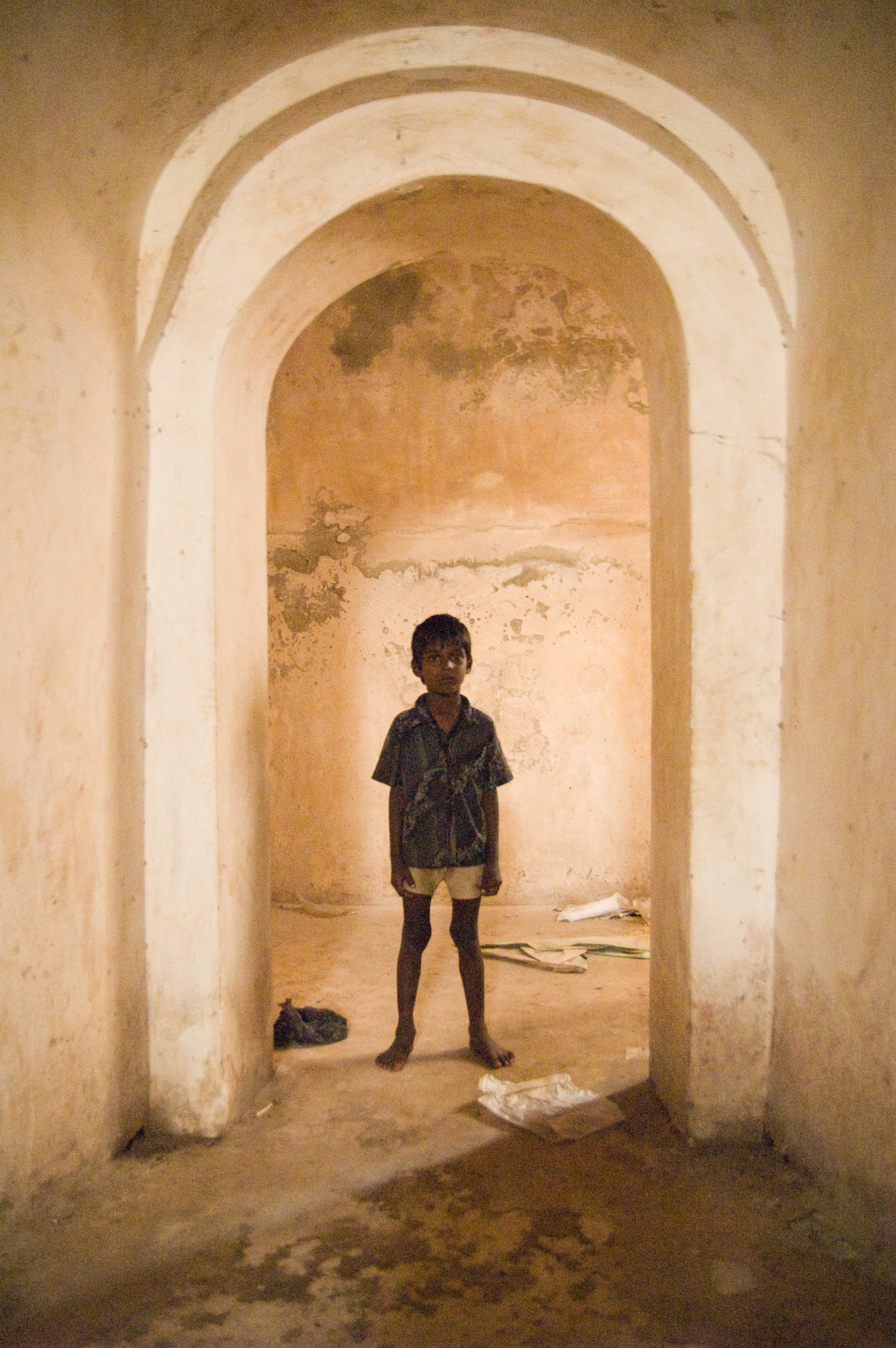
A dungeon at Seringapatam. Many Mangalorean Catholics who refused to embrace Islam were imprisoned in such dungeons.

According to the Barcoor Manuscript, written in Kannada by a Mangalorean Catholic from Barcoor after his return from Seringapatam, 20,000 of them (one-third) died on the march to Seringapatam due to hunger, disease, and ill treatment by the soldiers. At the camp at Jamalabad fort, Mangalorean Catholic leaders were thrown down from the fort. All Christian churches in South Canara, except the Hospet Church at Hospet and the Monte Mariano Church at Farangipet, were razed to the ground and all land owned by the captured Christians was taken over by Tipu and distributed among his favourites. After they were freed, all their belongings had disappeared and their deserted lands were being cultivated by the Bunts.

After arriving at Seringapatam, the Christian captives were made to forcibly embrace Islam, were tortured, or sentenced to death. The young men who refused to embrace Islam were disfigured by cutting their noses, upper lips, and ears. They were seated on asses, paraded through the city, and thrown into the dungeons of Seringapatam. Historian Praxy Fernandes, author of Storm over Seringapatam: The Incredible Story of Hyder Ali & Tippu Sultan, states that contrary to popular belief, 40,000 Christians were not kept manacled in the dungeons of Seringapatam.

Ludwig von Pastor, a German historian, claimed "countless" Mangalorean Catholics were hanged, including women with their children clinging around their necks. Others were trampled or dragged by elephants. The able-bodied young men were drafted into the army after being circumcised and converted to Islam. The young women and girls were distributed as wives to Muslim officers and favourites living in Seringapatam. According to Mr. Silva of Gangollim, a survivor of the captivity, if a person who had escaped from Seringapatam was found, Tipu had ordered the cutting off of the ears, nose, the feet, and one hand as punishment. The persecutions continued until 1792. This was followed by a brief relaxation period from 1792 to 1797, during which a few Catholic families managed to escape to Coorg, Cannanore, and Tellicherry. The persecutions resumed in 1797.

=== British and modern eras ===
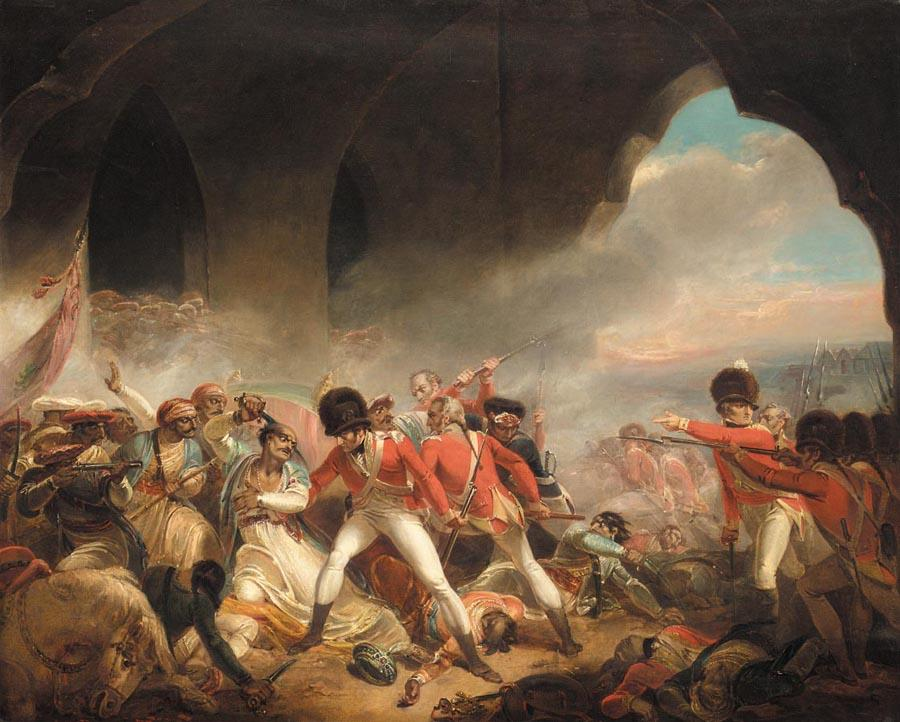
The Last Effort and Fall of Tippoo Sultaun by Henry Singleton

In the Battle of Seringapatam on 4 May 1799, the British army, under officers George Harris, David Baird, and Arthur Wellesley, stormed the fortress and breached the town of Seringapatam, with Tipu being killed in action. After his death in the Fourth Anglo-Mysore War, the Mangalorean Catholics were freed from his captivity. Of the 60,000–80,000 Mangalorean Catholics taken captive, only 15,000–20,000 made it out as Christians.

Historian Alan Machado Prabhu mentions that only 11,000 survived the captivity as Christians. British general Arthur Wellesley helped 10,000 of them return to South Canara and resettle on their lands. Of the remaining Christians freed, about a thousand went to Malabar, and some hundreds settled in Coorg. According to Francis Buchanan, 15,000 of them returned to Mangalore and its vicinity, while 10,000 of them migrated to Malabar. The Gazetteer of the Bombay Presidency (1883) mentions that 15,000 persons returned, of which 12,000 were from South Canara and 3,000 from North Canara. According to genealogist Michael Lobo, the present Mangalorean Catholic community is descended almost entirely from this small group of survivors.

Later, the British took over South Canara. In 1800, they took a census of the region. Of the 396,672 people living in South Canara, 10,877 were Christians. Thomas Munro was appointed the first collector of Canara in June 1799. He passed three orders in respect of the estates of the Christians, which were taken over by non-Christians during the captivity. Through the assistance of the church and with the support of Munro, the Christians were able to recover their lands and estates. Fr. José Miguel Luis de Mendes, a Goan Catholic priest, was appointed Vicar of Our Lady of Rosary of Mangalore on 7 December 1799. He took interest in the re-establishment of the community from 1799 to 1808. Later, British general John Goldsborough Ravenshaw was appointed collector of South Canara. He took an active part in the restoration of the Catholic community's former possessions and the recovery of its estates. He constructed a church for them, which was completed in 1806.

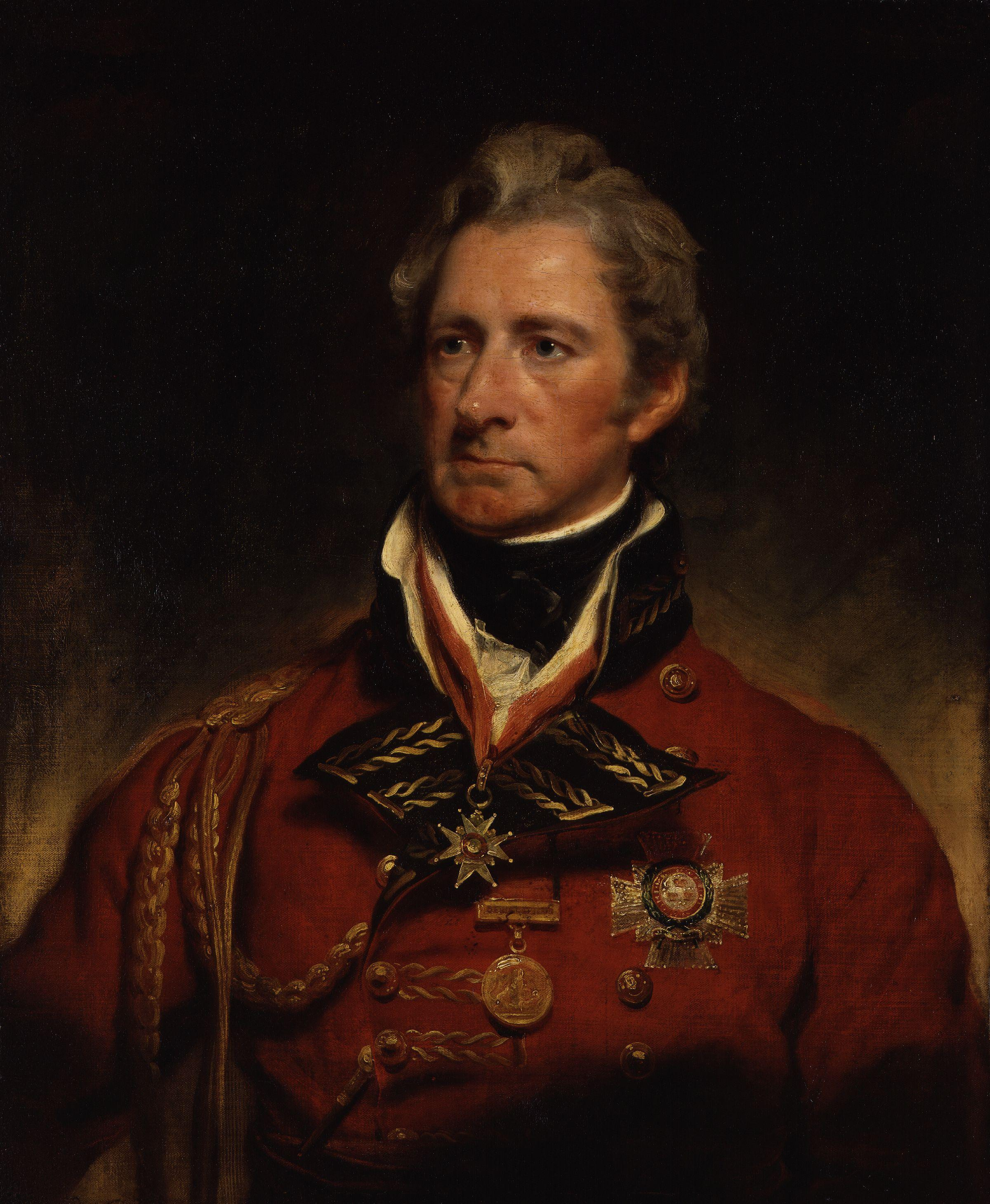
Thomas Munro helped the Mangalorean Catholics recover their lands after their return from captivity.

In 1800, there were 2,545 Catholic households with a population of 10,877. Their population almost doubled by 1818. According to various parish books, Mangalorean Catholics numbered 19,068 in South Canara (12,877 in Mangalore and Bantval, 3,918 in Moolki, 2,273 in Cundapore and Barcoor). Most of the churches which were earlier destroyed by Tipu were rebuilt by 1815. The community prospered under the British, and the jurisdiction of the Archbishop of Goa recommenced.

The opening of the Protestant German Basel Mission of 1834 in Mangalore brought many handicraft industries, such as cotton weaving and tile-manufacturing, to the region and led to a large-scale rise in employment. In 1836–37, the political situation in Portugal was in turmoil. Antonio Feliciano de Santa Rita Carvalho, a Portuguese priest, was appointed Archbishop-elect of Goa in September 1836 without authorisation from the then Pope, Gregory XVI. Many Mangalorean Catholics did not accept the leadership of Carvalho but instead submitted to the Vicar Apostolic of Verapoly in Travancore, while some of them continued to be under the jurisdiction of the Roman Catholic Archdiocese of Goa and Daman. The parishes in South Canara were divided into two groups—one under Goa and the other under Verapoly.

Under the leadership of Joachim Pius Noronha, a Mangalorean Catholic priest, and John Joseph Saldanha, a Mangalorean Catholic judge, the Mangalorean Catholics sent a petition to the Holy See in 1840 to establish Mangalore as a separate Vicariate. Conceding to their request, Pope Gregory XVI established Mangalore as a separate Vicariate on 17 February 1845 under the Verapoly Carmelites. The Mangalore Mission was transferred to the French Carmelites by a bull dated 3 January 1870. During the regime of Carmelites, the Mangalorean Catholics constantly sent memorandums to the Holy See to send Jesuits to Mangalore to start institutions for higher education, since students frequently had to go to Bombay and Madras for educational purposes. Pope Leo XIII, by the Brief of 27 September 1878, handed over the Mangalore mission to the Italian Jesuits of Naples, who reached Mangalore on 31 December 1878.

The Italian Jesuits played an important role in education, health, and social welfare of the community. They built St. Aloysius College in 1880, St Aloysius Chapel in 1884, St. Joseph's Seminary and many other institutions and churches. On 25 January 1887, Pope Leo XIII established the Diocese of Mangalore, which is considered to be an important landmark in the community's history. By the later half of the 19th century, many Mangalorean Catholics were involved in the Mangalore tile industry, coffee plantations, and trade in plantation products. They prospered under the British and competed with the local Brahmins for offices in the service of the British. The overwhelming majority of Mangalorean Catholics continued to remain agriculturists.

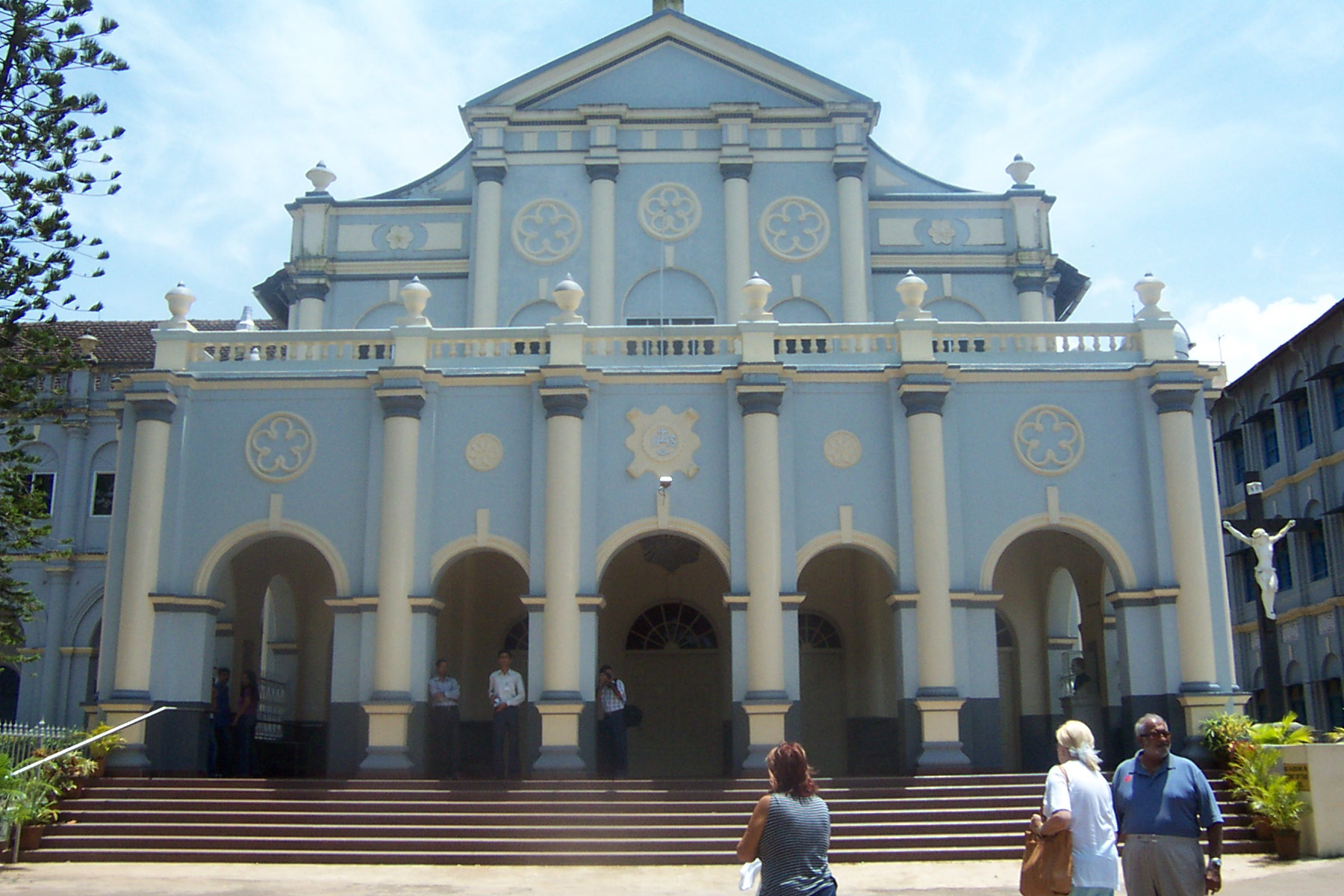
The St. Aloysius Chapel in Mangalore was built by Antonio Moscheni in 1884, after Mangalore was transferred to the Italian Jesuits in 1878.

During the later 19th century, they started migrating to other urban areas, especially Bombay, Bangalore, Calcutta, Karachi, Madras, Mysore and Poona. The Mangalorean Catholics came to Bombay out of economic necessity. The first permanent settlement of Mangalorean Catholics in Bombay was recorded in the 1890s. The first Mangalorean Catholic settlement in Madras was recorded in the 1940s. Joachim Alva, a Mangalorean Catholic politician, actively participated in uniting the Mangalorean Catholic community against the British during the Indian Independence Movement.

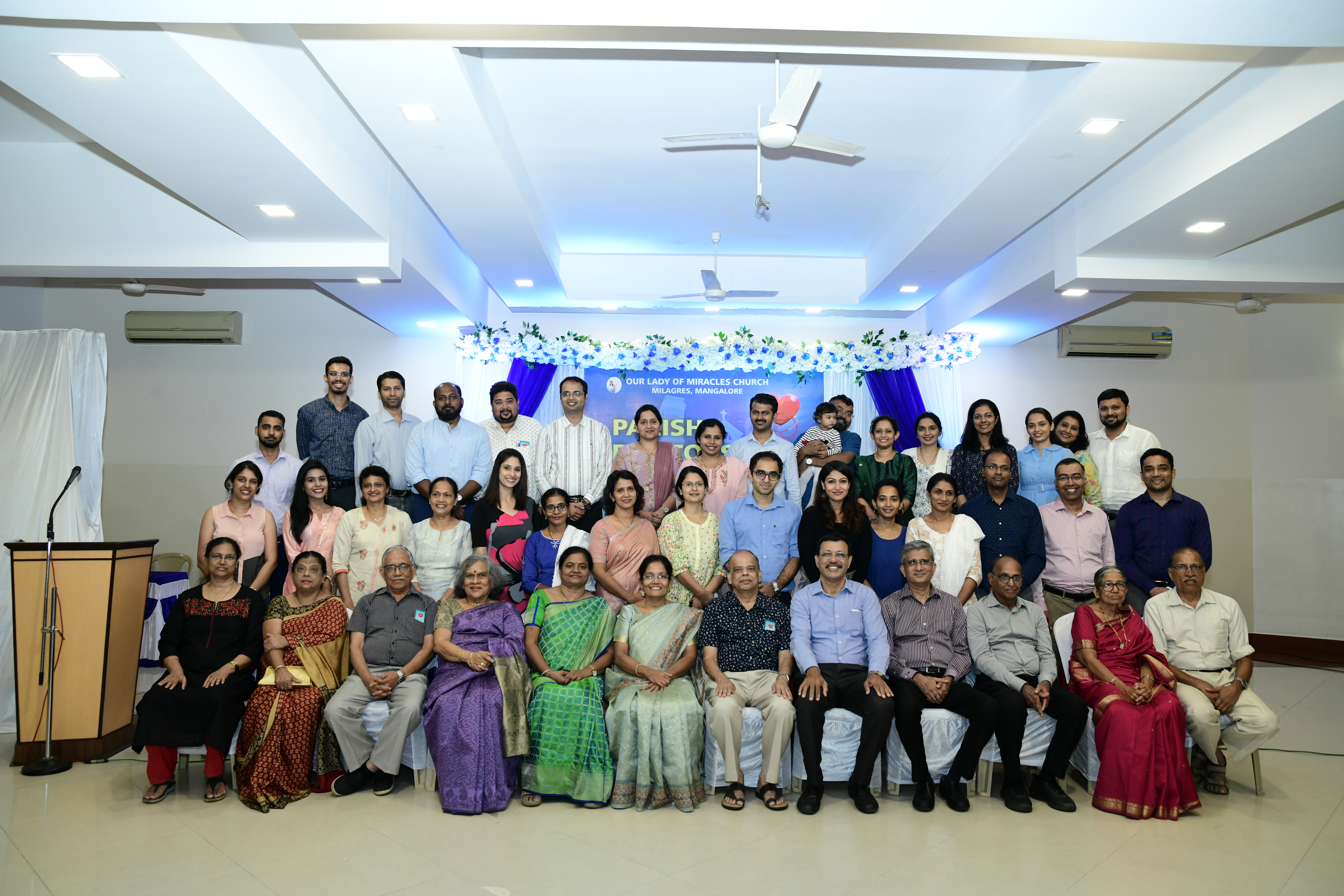
Mangalorean Catholic doctors in a gathering in 2023 at Milagres Church, Mangalore

In 1901, Mangalorean Catholics accounted for 76,000 of the total 84,103 Christians in South Canara., while in 1962, they numbered 186,741. During the mid-20th century, Victor Fernandes, Bishop of Mangalore from 1931 to 1955, erected a large cross at Nanthoor, near Padav hills, on the former outskirts of Mangalore, in honour of the memory of Mangalorean Catholic martyrs who died on the march and during their 15-year captivity at Seringapatam. During the 1970s, coastal communication increased between Bombay and Mangalore with the introduction of ships by the London-based trade firm Shepherd. These ships facilitated the entry of Mangalorean Catholics to Bombay. In 1993, the Mangalore Diocese estimated the population of Mangalorean Catholics to be 325,510 out of a total South Canara population of 3,528,540. This amounts to 9.23 per cent of the population. A notable post-independence era event pertaining to the Mangalorean Catholics that occurred in southern Karnataka, and made national headlines, were the attacks on Christian religious institutions in September 2008.

== Geographical distribution ==
The Roman Catholic Diocese of Mangalore estimates the population of Mangalorean Catholics in the areas that comprise historical South Canara to be 360,000 out of a total population of 3,957,071, or approximately 9.5 per cent of the population. Other regions of India having a significant proportion of Mangalorean Catholics, characterised by the presence of Mangalorean Catholic organisations or celebration of the unique Mangalorean Catholic Monti Fest festival, are Bangalore, Chennai, Delhi, Kolkata, Mumbai, Pune, Hyderabad, Chikkamagaluru, Hassan, and Ranchi. A few Mangalorean Catholics are found in Kodagu and Kerala, where there are tiny pockets concentrated in Thalassery, Kasargod, Kannur and Kochi. They are mainly descended from those Catholics who fled the persecution and roundup by Tipu Sultan. The Mangalorean Catholic diaspora is scattered across the globe. Many Mangalorean Catholics are found in Persian Gulf Arab states in the Middle East. The Mangalorean Catholic Association of Sydney (MCAS) has estimated that around 300 Mangalorean Catholic families live in Sydney, Australia, with a lot of second generation families. Many of these are multi-racial, being married into Anglo-Saxon, Spanish, Italian, Greek, and other ethnicities. Mangalorean genealogist Michael Lobo has estimated that approximately half of the Mangalorean Catholics still reside in Mangalore and the other towns in the South Canara district. As for the remaining half, about 15 per cent reside in other parts of Karnataka (mostly Bangalore), 15 per cent reside in Mumbai and its neighbouring areas, 10 per cent reside in the Persian Gulf countries, 5 per cent reside in other parts of India, and the remaining 5 per cent reside in other parts of the world.

== Culture ==
=== Architecture ===
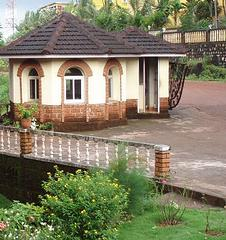
A traditional Mangalorean Catholic house

The German missionary Georg Plebst set up the first tile factory at Mangalore in 1860. It was called the Basel Mission tile factory. Mangalorean Catholics learnt the technique of preparing Mangalore tiles. The Albuquerque tile factory, the first Indian Mangalore tile factory, was started in South Canara by Pascal Albuquerque at Panemangalore in 1868. Since then, Mangalorean Catholics have been actively involved in manufacturing the tiles. The Alvares tile factory was established in Mangalore by Simon Alvares, a Mangalorean Catholic from Bombay, in 1878. In 1991–1992, out of twelve Mangalore tile manufacturing factories in Mangalore, six were owned by Christians. These tiles, prepared from hard clay, were in great demand throughout India, Myanmar, and Sri Lanka, and were even shipped to East Africa, the Middle East, Europe, and Australia. These were the only tiles to be recommended for Government buildings in India, and still define Mangalore's skyline and characterise its urban setting. Urban and rural housing follows the traditional variety of laterite brick structures with Mangalore tile roofing on steeply sloped roofs. Inside the house, a spacious hall is present while a large verandah is present in front of the house. The traditional houses tend to have spacious porticos, red cement or terracotta floors, and have fruit trees outside the house. The old Catholic houses of South Canara bear traces of Portuguese influence. The tall windows, pointed roofs, and verandahs are some of the Portuguese influenced architectural features of the century-old houses.

=== Cuisine ===
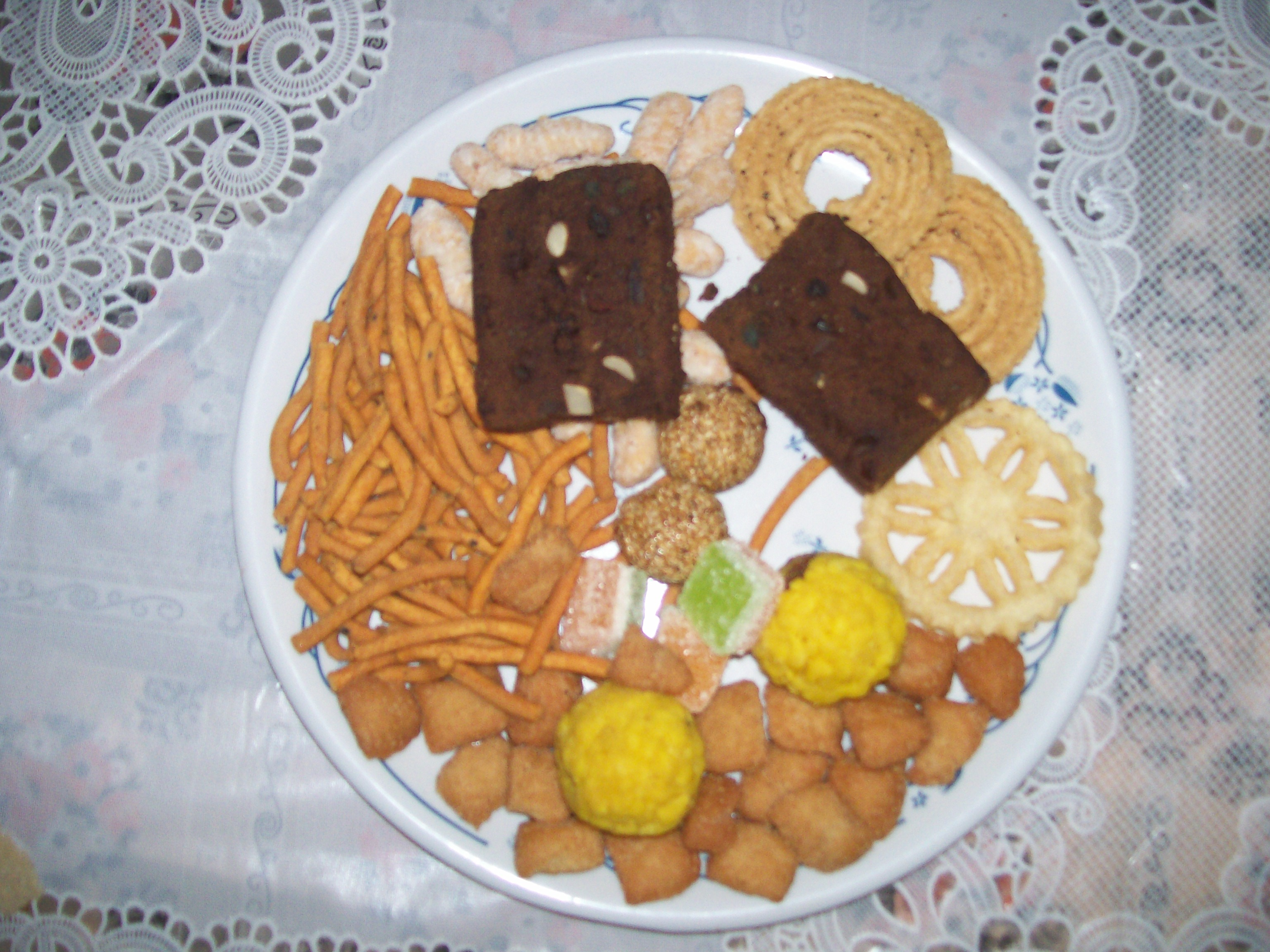
Kuswar are sweet delicacies prepared at Christmas, and include around 22 varieties of sweets.

Coconut and curry leaves are common ingredients to most curries. Sanna-Dukra Maas (Sanna is idli fluffed with toddy or yeast; Dukra Maas is pork) is one of the most popular dishes of the Mangalorean Catholic community. Rosachi Kadi (Ros Curry), a fish curry made with coconut milk (ros), is a traditional curry served during the Ros ceremony. Patrode, a dish of colocasia leaves stuffed with rice, dal, jaggery, coconut, and spices is popular. Kuswar are sweet delicacies prepared during Christmas and include around 22 varieties of sweets. Fish and rice form the staple diet of most Mangalorean Catholics. Par-boiled rice, known as red rice, is the traditional rice eaten and is preferred over raw rice.

=== Names and surnames ===
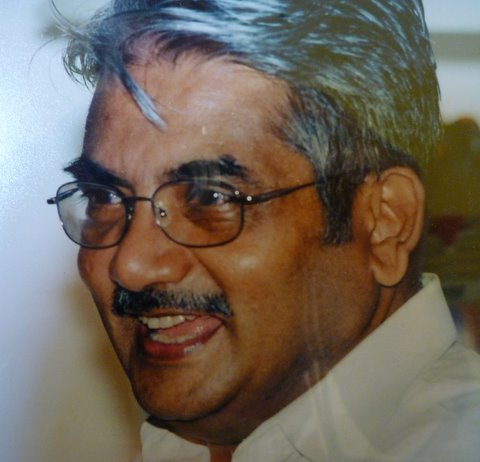
Maxwell Kaamath-Pereira, popularly known as Maxwell Pereira, is a senior-ranking IPS officer from Delhi.

Bilingual names, having variants in both Konkani and English, like Zuãuñ (from Portuguese João, meaning John) and Mornel (Magdalene) are common among Mangalorean Catholics who still use Konkani as the first language. Most Mangalorean Catholic names for males follow the second declension. Among women, the names follow the first declension, while among young girls, the names follow the second declension. Portuguese surnames like D'Souza, Coelho, and Pinto are common among Mangalorean Catholics, and generally follow the second declension. Rarely, other European surnames are found as well. Mangalorean Catholics also use Konkanised forms of their surnames in Konkani conversations, such as Soza, Kueli, Piint & so on; instead of the Portuguese forms of De Souza, Coelho, Pinto etc. Some families of Christian Cxatria and Christian Brahmin origin use surnames such as Porbu, Kamath, Naik, Shenoy & Shett. These original surnames are actually the names of five classes of persons: lord, cultivator, merchant, warrior, and writer. At least one of these are Saraswat Brahmin surnames, with the exception of Padival and Shett; Shett is used by those who trace their origins to Daivadnyas. These ancestral pre-Christian surnames are called paik in Konkani. A few have reverted to their paik surnames. While a few others use both, they use Konkani surnames which are hyphenated with the Portuguese ones. Mudartha is a rare and unique Konkani and Gaud Saraswat Brahmin surname found among a few Catholics who hail from Udupi.

| Mangalorean Catholic variant | English variant | Portuguese variant | Meaning | Sex |
|---|---|---|---|---|
| Mâri | Mary | Maria | Beloved | Female |
| Monku | Monica | Mónica | To advise | Female |
| Motes | Matthew | Mateus | Gift from God | Male |
| Nâtu | Natalia | Natália | Birthday | Female |
| Pedru | Peter | Pedro | Stone | Male |
| Šila | Sylvester | Silva | Wooded | Male |
| Zâbel | Elizabeth | Isabel | My God is my oath | Female |
| Zoze | Joseph | José | The Lord will add | Male |
Source: An English–Konkani Dictionary (1882) and A Konkani Grammar (1882)

=== Language and literature ===
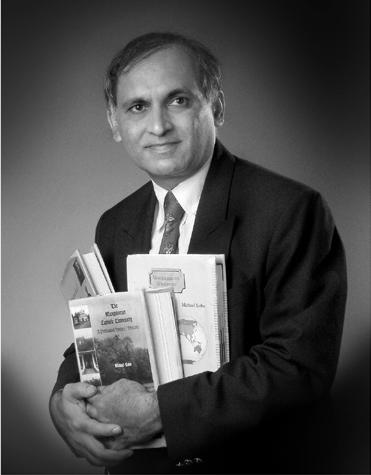
Michael Lobo published the first genealogical encyclopaedia of the Mangalorean Catholic community in 1999.

Mangalorean Catholics speak the Konkani language, which they have retained as their mother tongue despite the migration; the language is central to the community's identity. They speak a dialect known as Mangalorean Catholic Konkani, which the Ethnologue broadly identifies as the Mangalore dialect.

The Mangalorean Catholic dialect has Sanskrit influences, and preserves many features of the Maharashtri, Shauraseni, and Magadhi dialects of Prakrit. It also has loanwords from the Tulu and Kannada languages. It is written in the Kanarese script. The dialect does not distinguish between the nouns of Kannada and Konkani and has developed into a language that is very practical for business. Some Kannada root words which have disappeared from the Goan dialects due to the influence of Portuguese have re-entered the Mangalorean lexicon. 350–400 Portuguese lexical items are found in the Mangalorean Catholic dialect, of which more than half are related to religious terminology. The influence of Portuguese syntax is only found in some sets of phrases and prayers which have come down from the pre-migration era.

The Mangalorean Catholic dialect is largely derived from the Bardeskaar (North Goan) dialect and bears a good degree of intelligibility with the modern Bardeskaar dialect (spoken by North Goan Christians) and to a slightly lesser extent with the standard Konkani dialect. It consequently differs from the dialect spoken by the Goud Saraswat Brahmins in South Canara, which is copiously derived and bears a good degree of intelligibility with the modern Sashtikaar (South Goan) dialect spoken by South Goan Christians and North Canara Konkani Hindus. It is much closer to the dialects of the Goan Hindus than to that of the Goan Catholics.

The Italian Jesuits who arrived in Mangalore in 1878, devoted themselves to the study and development of Konkani, and were thus responsible for the revival of the Konkani language in Mangalore. The origin of their literature dates to 1883, when Angelus Francis Xavier Maffei, an Italian Jesuit, published the first An English–Konkani Dictionary in Mangalore. He published a book on Konkani grammar in 1882, with a revised version in 1893. In 1912 the first Konkani periodical, Konknni Dirvem (Konkani Treasure), was published in Mangalore by Louis Mascarenhas. Popular Konkani periodicals published in Mangalore include Raknno (Guardian) (1938) by Mons. Sylvester Menezes, Konkan Daiz (Heritage of Konkani) (1958), and Kannik (Donation) (1965) by Raymond Miranda. The twentieth-century literature focused on themes like the suffering of the Mangalorean Catholics during their 15-year captivity at Seringapatam and the oppression of Goan Catholics during the Goa Inquisition. The first Konkani novel in Karnataka Aangel (1915), was written in the Kannada script by Joachim Santan Alvares. In Bombay—which had a small Mangalorean Catholic community—periodicals like Sukh-Dukh (Ups and Downs) (1948) by G.M.B. Rodrigues, Konknni Yuvak (Konkani Youth) (1949) by George Fernandes, Poinnari (Traveller) (1950) by V.J.P. Saldanha, and Divo (Lamp) (1995) by J.B. Moraes were published.

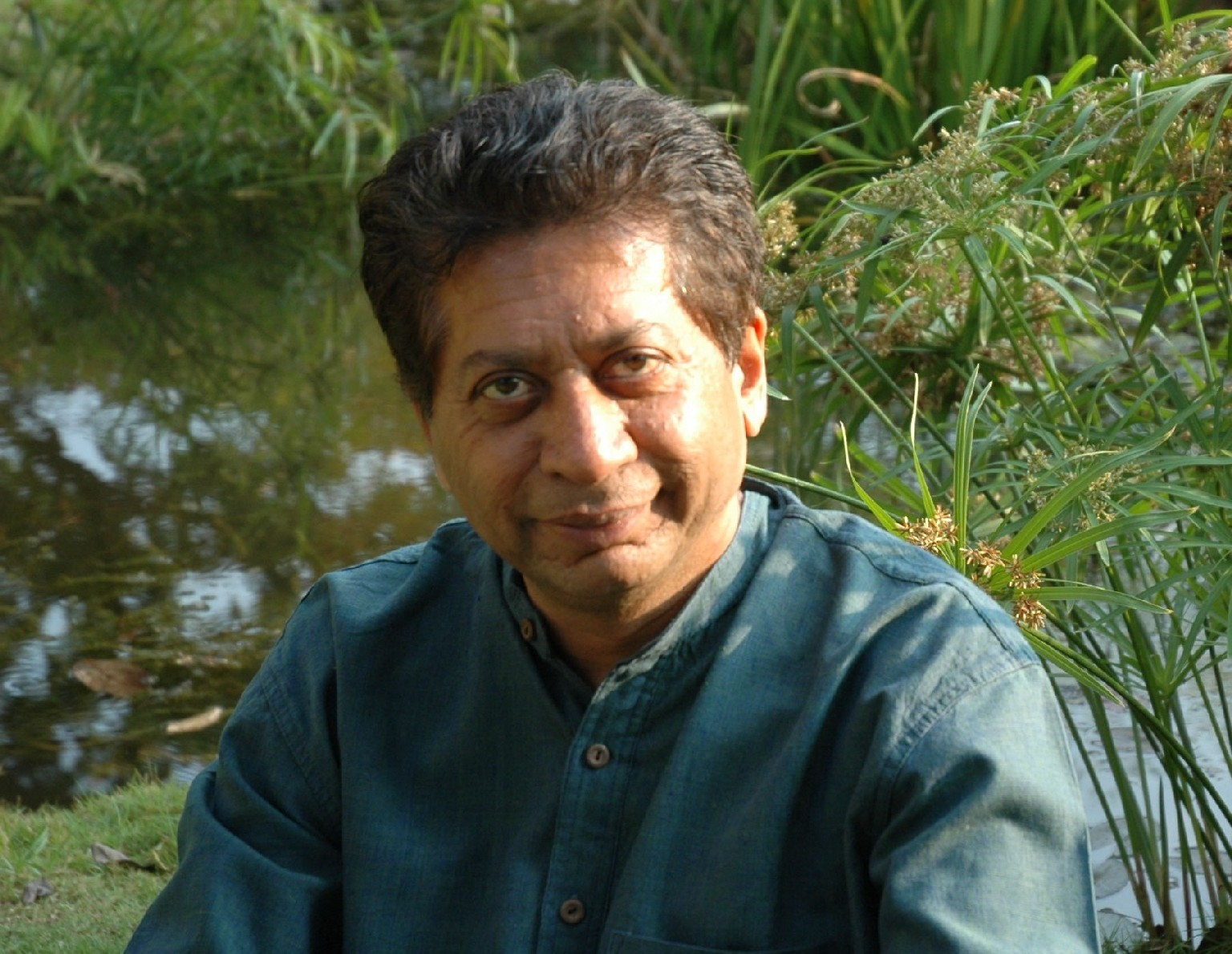
Richard Crasta is best known for his work The Revised Kamasutra, a novel on sexual desires.

Modern literature is diverse and includes themes such as Indian politics in books like What Ails the Socialists by George Fernandes, historical awakening, in books such as Sarasvati's Children: A History of the Mangalorean Christians by Alan Machado Prabhu, and sexual desires, in The Revised Kama Sutra: A Novel of Colonialism and Desire by Richard Crasta. Genealogist Michael Lobo published the first genealogical Encyclopedia of the Mangalorean Catholic community in 1999. This genealogical encyclopaedia, which exceeds 6,000 pages, covers over a thousand families, each of which is researched as far as its ancestry can be traced. Three offshoots have thus far been launched, which include Mangaloreans Worldwide – An International Directory (1999), Distinguished Mangalorean Catholics (2000), and The Mangalorean Catholic Community – A Professional History / Directory (2002). William Robert da Silva translated the first complete Bible from English into Konkani. The work entitled Baibol (Bible) was written in the Kannada script, and published by the Mangalore-based Konkani Bible committee in 1997. In 2000, the Mangalore Diocese also released a Konkani Bible in Kannada script entitled Pavitr Pustak (Holy Book), which was made available online on 26 July 2007.

=== Customs and festivals ===
Mangalorean Catholics have retained many Indian customs and traditions; these are especially visible during the celebration of a marriage. Their culture is more traditional and Indian. Though the Portuguese traded quite frequently in Mangalore, and most of the priests arriving in the area were Portuguese, there did not develop a community identified with Portugal and Portuguese culture. Their marriage rites have similarities with the Shenvi sub-caste of the Saraswat Brahmins. It was mainly these pre-Christian marriage rites that the Portuguese found objectionable and prohibited during the Goan Inquisition.

The roce^{[b]} (ritual bathing) ceremony, conducted one or two days before a wedding, celebrates the last day of virginity of the bride and the groom; it involves the parents' blessing the bride and groom, who are bathed in roce (coconut milk), while a cross is inscribed on the bride's forehead. The ethnic Konkani marriage rituals include soirik (betrothal), exchange of paan pod^{[c]} (betel leaves) during the marriage ceremony, which known as badalchen (changing hands; formal acceptance of the promise made by the bride's father to the bridegroom's father that he will give his daughter in marriage).^{[d]} The bride is adorned with the sado (wedding sari) and pirduk^{[f]} (wedding necklace). Other rites include the onpnni or vopsun diunche (giving away the bride formally by the father or the guardian of the bride), porthoponn (re-invitation to the bride's house), and singing of honvious (hymns). Some other customs include novemjeevon (partaking of the food prepared from new corn) and novem (blessing of new harvests).

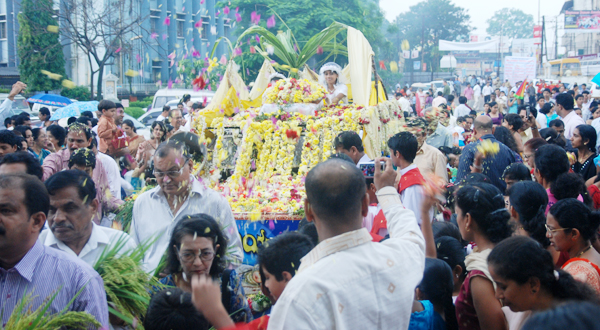
A Monti Fest celebration near the Milagres Church in Hampankatta, Mangalore

In addition to common Christian festivals like Christmas, Great Friday, and Easter, the community celebrates many other festivals of religious and historical significance. Monti Fest is one of the major festivals, celebrated on 8 September. It combines the Nativity of the Blessed Virgin Mary and blessing of novem (new crops). The festival derives its name from the Monte Mariano Church at Farangipet, and was initiated by Fr Joachim Miranda, a Goan priest at Farangipet, in 1763. Although Tipu Sultan destroyed the churches of Canara, he spared Monte Mariano Church in deference to the friendship of his father Hyder Ali with Fr Miranda. Attur Jatre or Attur Fest (Attur festival) is the feast of St Lawrence, celebrated at the St. Lawrence Shrine on the outskirts of Karkala. This shrine, in existence since 1759, is said to have a history of miracles. Evkaristik Purshanv (Eucharistic Procession) is an annual religious procession led by the Bishop of Mangalore from Milagres Church to Rosario Cathedral. The procession, held on the first Sunday of the New Year of the Gregorian calendar, seeks blessings for the new year.

=== Costumes and ornaments ===
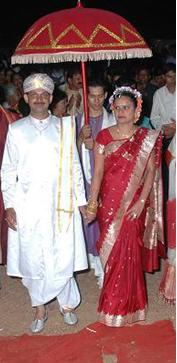
A Mangalorean Catholic couple dressed in traditional wedding costumes. The bride is wearing a wedding sari (sado); while the groom is wearing a todop (golden hem), kutanv (coat), pudvem (dhoti) & urmaal (turban).

Mangalorean Catholic men traditionally white or black coats known as kutanv (similar to the bandhgalas), while the pudvem (dhoti), a piece of unstitched cloth, usually around 7 yards (6.4 m) long, was wrapped around the waist and the legs and knotted at the waist. The turban called mundaas or urmal, were usually flattened like the Coorgi turbans. It was a long white piece of cloth with a todop (golden hem) tied around the head like a turban in a particular manner by which they could be easily identified as Catholic Christians. In modern times however, this mode has changed. Only a few older men can be seen wearing this traditional dress on church-going occasions.

Before marriage, women used to wear a kirgi (half sari) and baju (kurti). The kirgi is a piece of cloth not longer than four feet, and about three feet wide. It was wrapped around the body from the waist down. A jacket with long sleeves called a baju, was used to cover the upper part of the body. This dress was a sign of the bride's virginity and was worn during the roce or ros ceremony. The kirgi was wrapped around the waist, but the end of the sari is not thrown over the shoulder. To wear the full sari with its end thrown over the shoulder, known as worl, it was the exclusive right of a married woman. Married women used to wear sarees the general way. The salwar kameez and the lungi are forms of popular clothing among present-day Mangaloreans. The Mangalorean Catholic bride's wedding sari is known as a sado.^{[e]} It is usually a red-coloured Benaresi sari which is made of finely woven silk and is decorated with elaborate engravings. In olden days, the bride wore on her head a red cloth, three feet square. Gold ornaments were absent in those days: the bride went to the church dressed as a virgin girl. In modern times, the bride wears (in place of the kirgi) a red sari, but the end of the sari is not thrown over the shoulder; it is wrapped around the waist. The bride wears a few gold ornaments, some rings on the fingers, earrings, and at least two of the dantoni (golden combs). Other ornaments worn by the bride in the olden days included kanti, chakrasar, kap, karap, mugud, kanto, and dantoni.

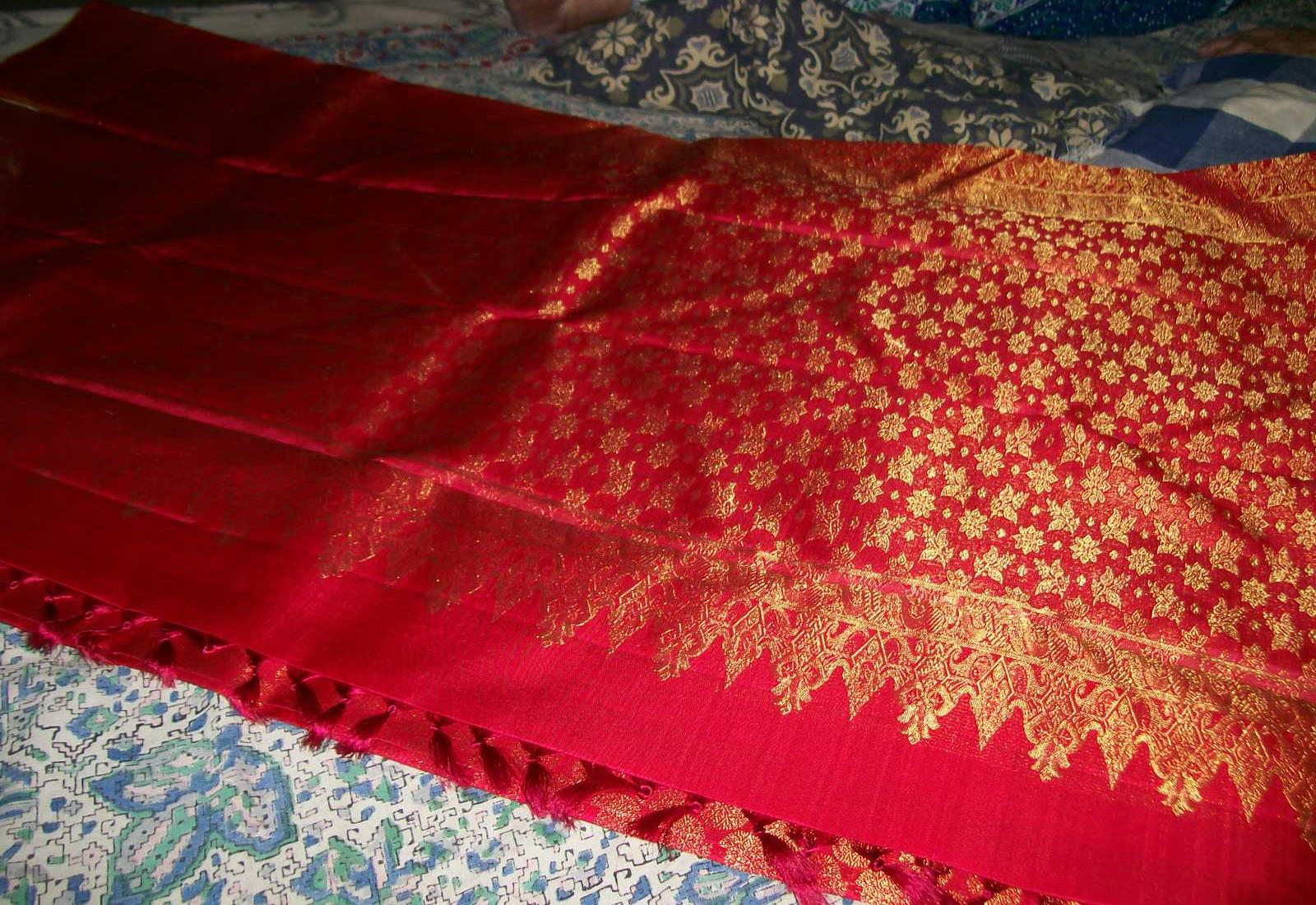
A Mangalorean Catholic wedding sari (sado).

Dantoni consist of two ordinary combs with the upper part of each one plated with gold; they are worn in the hair on both sides of the head over the ears. On the way to church the bride wears some white and red flowers stuck in the hair. In the centre of the forehead, a bang (gold chain) was placed with a pendant. The pirduk (mangalsutra)^{[f]} is a necklace made of black beads strung on gold wire as either as a single chain or double chain, with a connecting pendant. This necklace is worn as long as the husband is alive; a widow is expected to take it off. It is highly prized by women as the symbol of their married state. A widow is expected to wear a black sari for the remainder of her life, and is not allowed to wear ornaments. The bridegroom's dress in early times consisted of a breechcloth (dhoti), with a red and gold hem (todop), a coat (kutanv) & a towel (urmal) on the head. The bridegroom wore a chakrasar (neck chain) around his neck. He wore a pair of sandals or at least a pair of socks. Presently, most Mangalorean Catholic couples opt for a white wedding, where the groom wears a black suit, while the bride wears a white dress. The traditional style of wedding is becoming exceedingly rare.

=== Historical society ===
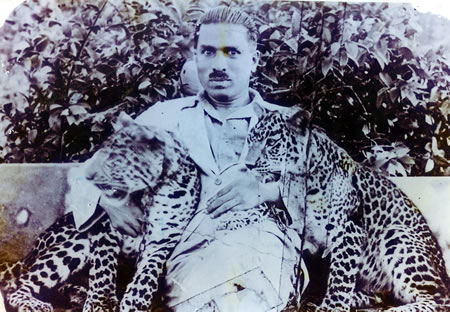
A Mangalorean Catholic gentleman belonging to the Bamonn caste, c. 1938

Catholics were divided into three broad divisions: the higher classes of Catholics were landlords, merchants and public servants. The middle classes were traders, cultivators; the lower classes were agricultural laborers, tailors and domestic servants. Mangalorean Catholics retained the same caste system as their Konkani ancestors in Goa. They were mainly divided into four castes: Bamonns, Charodis, Sudirs, and Gaudis. There were also local converts from Bunt, Beary, Koragas, Holeya, Mogaveera, Billavas, Mansa and other communities due to the social reform and missionary activities of the Jesuits and Capuchins in the 19th and early 20th centuries.

Converts from Brahmin sub-castes such as the Saraswat Brahmins, Padyes, Daivadnya goldsmiths/ merchants etc; were merged into the Christian caste of Bamonn. The Bamonns were further divided into other subcastes or classes according to rank. In Mangalore, they were sub-divided into Sirudhegars (the highest class), Alhdhengars, Cutdhnangars, Dhivodegars, Nathnolegars, Sashragars, Puruvargars, and Maidhegars. These names are taken from the villages to which they once belonged. According to John B. Kutinha of the Karnataka Second Backward Classes Commission, the Bamon Christians and Sarodi Christians were akin to Vaishyas and Shudras, and the Gaudi Christians were akin to untouchables.

The Charodis were converts from the Kshatriya (warrior class) and Vaishya (merchant class) castes. They were generally engaged in farming, trade, and commercial vocations. The artisan converts formed the third group who were known as Sudirs (the Konkani word for Shudras who were the labour class). They were workers and agricultural labourers engaged in service professions. The converts from the fisher caste residing around Ullal, Kuloor, and other places around the seacoast were called Gaudis, and formed the fourth group. They cultivated the lands of the Bamonns and the high-caste Hindus. Other minor castes included the Padvals, whom historian Severine Silva found to be native Tulu Jain Bunt converts.

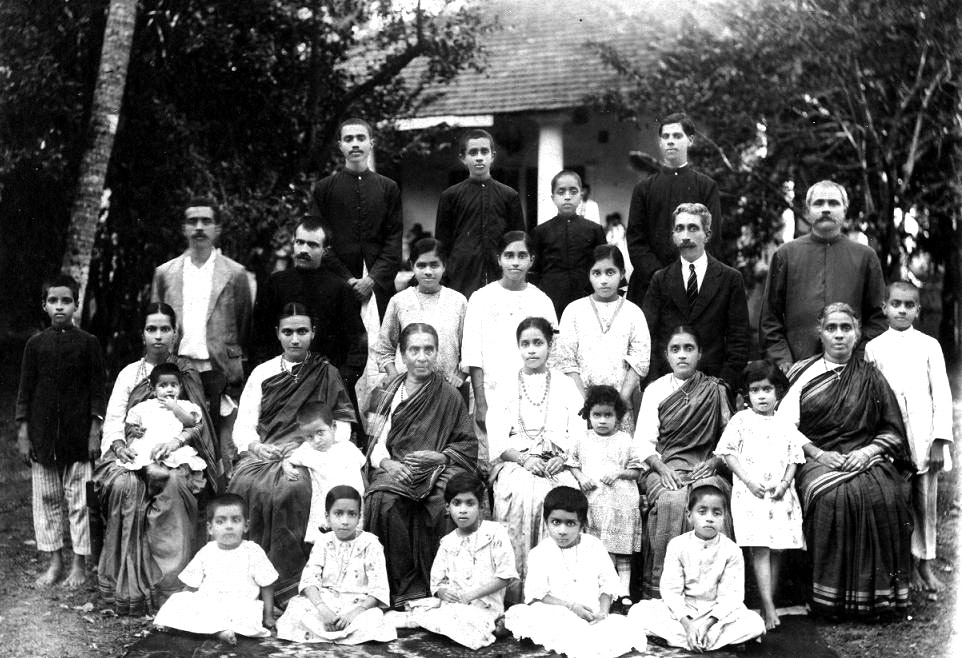
An extended Catholic family in Mangalore belonging to the Bamonn caste, year 1929.

The Mangalorean Catholics constituted a small community widely scattered across the South Canara district. Rather than being a closely knit and united group, the Goan Catholic immigrants and their progeny did not associate with the native Catholics on account of caste, origin, and language, and even among themselves were strongly divided by caste. The Hindu uppercastes, including the indigenous Brahmins (mostly belonging to the Shivalli, Havyaka, and Kota sub-groups) and Bunts did not associate with the Catholic Christians and would not admit them into their houses on account of their religion. However, a close contact was kept by the Catholic Christians with the Hindus of the same caste who were migrants from Goa. Catholic Christians would invite their Hindu cousins to festivities such as birth celebrations, weddings, and funeral feasts. The Hindus accepted such invitations. Unlike the Hindu counterpart, a high-caste Mangalorean Catholic did not consider himself polluted upon physical contact with a member of the lower castes, but members of different castes did not fraternise or invite each other home for dinner. According to sociologist Vinay Rajath D, the relationship between caste and occupation was very tenuous among Catholic Christians, as Bamons as well as Sudirs consisted of cultivators, agricultural labourers, traders, masons, and cooks.

Marriage between members of the various castes was not permitted, and such matches were strictly discouraged by the elders. For instance, a Bamonn boy would only marry a Bamonn girl and a Charodi boy would only marry a Charodi girl. The Bamonns and Charodis would invite neighbours and friends belonging to the Sudir and Gaudi castes to special occasions such as weddings and baptisms, although the latter would have to observe certain restrictions with regards to sitting and eating. The lower castes felt honoured if they were invited and usually accepted such invitations. The upper castes usually did not attend the ceremonies of the lower castes, even if expressly invited.

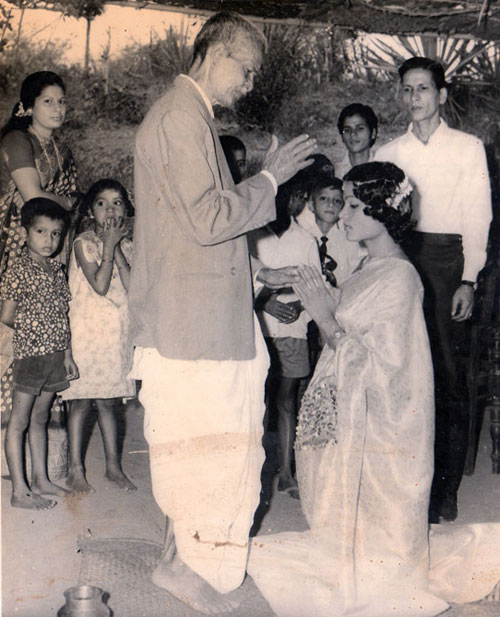
The sacristan of St Lawrence Church, Moodubelle, gives his blessings to his granddaughter during her Ros ceremony, year 1975. He wears a short kurta and a dhoti.

It was difficult for the few priests who had accompanied the Christian emigrants to South Canara to look after them properly. Thus, the gurkar system came into existence. Gurkars were Mangalorean Catholic men of good moral character who were selected as headmen in Christian settlements. They were entrusted with the social and religious supervision of the community. After migration, the only possible occupation of a Mangalorean Catholic was agriculture, since they were skilled farmers. Every farmer practised carpentry, but it was quite primitive and unskilled, and other crafts and industries were non-existent. The mass was celebrated in Latin; but the sermon, the catechism, and the explication of the mysteries were delivered to the congregation in Konkani.

The parishes were grouped into deaneries called varados. Every parish was divided into wards, while parish councils were present in most parishes. About 15 percent of the households in the parishes were literate. A widow had to remain indoors, practically for the rest of her life. Since high-caste Hindu widows cannot remarry after the death of their husbands, the high-caste Christians too considered the remarriage of a widow as something unnatural. Canon law did allow remarriage for widows and therefore there was no direct prohibition for widows to remarry in the society of the Christians of South Canara. Few women had the courage to go against the strict conventions of their community. A widow who remarried was looked down upon, pitied, and shunned as unlucky. But she was not ill-treated or made an outcast, and no stigma was attached to her husband. Succession to property was practised as per the Hindu laws.

By the end of the 20th century however, social categorization and differentiation became manifested not on various factors apart from caste. Catholic Christians who belonged to the lower economic classes and were tenants in former times now have become land owners, due to the land reforms. Mangalorean Catholic society had become very mobile owing to factors such as education, job affiliation, non-agricultural jobs, acquisition of wealth, cultivation of cash crops, inter-caste marriages, inter-religious marriages, and migration to metropolitan cities.

=== Songs and music ===
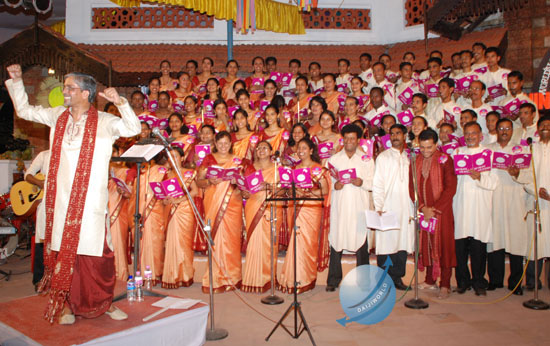
Konkani Nirantari, a Konkani cultural event, entered the Guinness Book of World Records for non-stop singing of Konkani hymns.

On 26 and 27 January 2008, a Konkani cultural event, Konkani Nirantari, held in Mangalore by the Mangalorean Catholic organisation Mandd Sobhann; entered the Guinness Book of World Records for non-stop singing of Konkani hymns. Mandd Sobhann members sang for 40 hours, surpassing the old record of 36 hours held by a Brazilian musical troupe, Communidade Evangelica Luterana São Paulo (Lutheran Evangelical Community of São Paulo) of Universidade Luterana do Brasil (Lutheran University of Brazil). The Silver Band, started in 1906 by Lawrence D'Souza in Mangalore, is one of the oldest and most popular brass bands in Mangalore. The well-known Konkani hymn Riglo Jezu Molliant (Jesus entered the Garden of Gethsemene) was written by Fr. Joachim Miranda, an 18th-century Goan Catholic priest, when he was held captive by Tipu Sultan on his Canara mission. Mons. Minguel Placid Colaco wrote the devotional hymn Jezucho Mog (Jesus' Love) in 1905, and translated the Latin hymn Stabat Mater into Konkani under the title Khursa Mullim (Bottom of the Holy Cross). Joseph Saldanha's Shembor Cantigo (100 Hymns) and Raimundo Mascarenhas' Deva Daia Kakultichea (O Compassionate Master) were popular. Other popular Konkani hymns composed by Mangalorean Catholics are Aika Cristanv Jana (Listen, O' Christian People), Utha Utha Praniya (Wake up, Creatures), and Sorgim Thaun (From Heaven).

Konkani pop music became popular after Indian Independence in 1947. Henry D'Souza and Helen D'Cruz are known for the Konkani love duet Kathrina in 1971 and the love Ballad Garacho Divo (Lamp of the House) in the 1970s, while Wilfy Rebimbus' sonnet Mog Tuzo Kithlo Axelom (How I Have Loved Thee) from 1977 is popular. Konkani plays, especially religious ones, were written and staged in Mangalore in the 20th century by prominent playwrights such as Pedru John D'Souza, Pascal Sequeira and Bonaventure Tauro. The Ghumat was a popular musical instrument played especially during weddings. The instrument has the form of an earthen pot but is open at both sides. One end is covered with the skin of some wild animal, and the other is left open. The traditional theatre form is called Gumat, and is performed on the eve of the marriage or in connection with the marriage celebrations in the decorated pandal (stage). The play is conducted by males belonging to both the brides' and bridegrooms' parties, and usually takes place for two or three nights. The plays performed are usually those of Biblical stories, and their morals are presented with the purpose of educating the bride and bridegroom. This tradition has almost completely died out among the present generation.

The tradition of Voviyo (wedding songs), sung by women during a Ros, is important to this community. The procedure is that an elderly lady, usually the yejman (wife of the master of ceremonies, who is known as yejmani) who knows the voviyos, leads the song while the rest of the women sing along. Only women whose husbands are still living may sing. In ancient times, the wedding songs expressed very lofty sentiments and gave vent to the feelings of the people about the marriage partners and their families, invoking the blessing of God on them.

Aprosachi vatli, kasgran petli, ruzai mai betli, hea rosalagim.
The Ros brass plate is made by brass smith, our Lady of Rosary is here at this ros ceremony.

Dimbi ami galeam, santa kuru kadeam, kurpa ami magieam amchea Jezulagim.
Let us kneel, make sign of the cross, and pray for God's grace.

Akashim mod, narl kubear telacho kuris hokleachea kopalar.
Clouds in the sky, coconut on the tree, oily sign of cross on the forehead of the bride.

— Voviyos taken from The Tradition of Voviyo article by Maurice D'Mello

=== Castes ===
Konkani Christians of the erstwhile South Kanara area belong to multiple castes, that correspond to the Hindu castes they converted from. These include: Gowdis, Charodis, Bahmons, Sudirs, Kharvi, Dalits, Madivals, Renders, Kumbars, Koragas, etc. Other communities in the region treated the Catholic Christians of Dakshina Kannada as a single jati or caste group but the Catholics were not a monolithic block. Historically, they had internal divisions and inter-marriages between these castes were not forbidden, but rarely took place. Caste differences among Mangalore catholics have reduced because of advancing education, inter-caste marriages, inter-religious marriages, migration to the gulf, and land reforms in the 1970s. As Christians in Karnataka, they are classified under Category III(B) of other backward classes in Karnataka and are eligible for reservations in education and government employment for non creamy-layer sections, while scheduled caste converts to Christianity are classified under Category I.

== Organisations ==
Many organisations cater to the community in South Kanara. The most notable are Mandd Sobhann, which broke the Guinness record for non-stop singing, and the Catholic Association of South Kanara (CASK). The first session of the Canara Konkani Catholic World Convention took place on 26 December 2004 in Mangalore. The convention aimed to establish institutions to conduct research on the history of Mangalorean Catholics.

In India, the Kanara Catholic Association, Mumbai, (KCA Mumbai, established in 1901), the Kanara Catholic Association, (KCA Bangalore, established in 1955) and Mangalore Catholic Association, (Pune) (MCA, established on 10 February 1996) in are well known. Also the Kanara Entrepreneurs, Bangalore (established in 2007) a non profit group to promote skill development and success among Mangalorean Catholic Entrepreneurs, students and catholic institutions are part of the efforts to help the community.

In the United Kingdom, Mangalorean United Konkani Association (MUKA) in Nottingham is popular.

In Australia, The Mangalorean Catholic Association of Victoria (MCAV) established in Melbourne was the first organisation for the community in Australia. In 2006 the Mangalorean Catholic Association of Sydney (MCAS) was established in Australia.

In Singapore, the Singapore Mangalorean and Goan Association (SingManGo) group caters to the needs of those who have migrated there.

In North America, the Mangalorean Association of Canada and the Mangalorean Konkan Christian Association (MKCA) in Chicago are well known.

In the Middle East, the Mangalore Cultural Association (MCA) in Doha, Qatar; was established in March 2008.

== Notable people ==
- Joachim Alva, member of the Rajya Sabha, the upper house of the Indian Parliament, from 1968 to 1974
- Margaret Alva, member of Rajya Sabha from 1972 to 1998; appointed Governor of Uttarakhand in 2009
- Adline Castelino, winner of Miss Diva Universe 2020
- Janalynn Castelino, Indian-Italian pop singer, songwriter and doctor
- Blasius D'Souza, Politician in the Indian National Congress and first Roman Catholic minister in the Karnataka state government
- Faye D'Souza, Indian journalist and television news anchor
- Jerome D'Souza, Jesuit priest, educationist, writer, and member of the Indian Constituent assembly from 1946 to 1950*
- Tony D'Souza, American novelist
- Erica Fernandes, television actress
- George Fernandes, former Defence Minister of India from 1998 to 2004
- Oscar Fernandes, member of Lok Sabha, the lower house of the Indian Parliament, from 1980 to 1998
- Terence Lewis (choreographer), Indian dancer, singer and choreographer
- John Richard Lobo, former MLA of Mangalore South constituency
- Michael Lobo, Indian writer, scientist and genealogist
- Rita Lobo, Indian former actress and singer
- Malishka Mendonsa, Indian radio personality and actress
- Sonal Monteiro, Indian actress - Tulu, Kannada, Konkani language
- Betty Naz, Indian former actress and singer
- Ester Noronha, Indian actress and singer - Telugu, Kannada, Konkani language
- Brian J. G. Pereira, veteran biopharmaceutical and healthcare leader
- Maxwell Pereira, IPS officer
- Freida Pinto, Hollywood actress known for her role in Slumdog Millionaire
- Pius Fidelis Pinto, Indian historian, researcher and scholar on Christianity
- Viren Rasquinha, captain of India's national field hockey team
- Mabel Rebello, member of Parliament Bhopal
- Wilfy Rebimbus, Konkani singer and lyricist
- Jemimah Rodrigues, Indian professional cricketer - India women's national cricket team
- Melvyn Rodrigues, Sahitya Akademi award (2011) winning Konkani poet
- Victor Rodrigues, Konkani novelist and short story writer
- Lawrence Saldanha, archbishop of Lahore Archdiocese from 2001 to 2011
- V.J.P. Saldanha, Konkani litterateur, dramatist, musician, and poet
- Aarti Sequeira, Indian American cook and television personality

== Notes ==
a Most of the Christian soldiers in the Keladi Nayaka army belonged to the Charodi caste.
b The Ros is a ceremony similar to the Tel ceremony performed by the Goan Hindus. The Tel is an auspicious ceremony during which the Hindu bride wears a yellow sari, while ladies from the family would rub the body with turmeric and oil. They would apply it with the help of two leaves of a mango tree over the forehead, neck, chest, shoulder arms and legs of the bride. A similar pattern was followed wherein the Christian bride was smeared with turmeric paste, coconut milk, rice flour with the leaves of ambolim to make the skin smooth, fair and prepare the bride for marriage. In 1736, this practice was banned by the Holy Inquisition in Goa.
c Bido is the small packet of pieces of areca nut wrapped into a betel leaf with the addition of several spices. Pan-pod is the same, but loosely placed on a plate, so that each guest can prepare his own pan. The areca nut, uncut, is called popal, cut into small pieces it is pod.
d In the past, Canara was famous for its spices. And so, paan (betel leaf) and pod (areca nut cut into small pieces), the seed of the tropical palm Areca catechu were generously supplied on all festive occasions. The spices were not mixed with chuno (Quick lime). In fact, in every house a copper or brass plate was always kept ready for a pan-pod party. Whenever a guest arrived at the house, it was customary to offer him this plate with a fresh betel leaf just picked from the vine. A betel nut known as tobak or dumti (Tobacco) was prepared and placed on the brass plate.
e After the wedding was over, the sado was well preserved and worn only on high feast-days or for weddings. Sometimes, a particularly precious sado was handed down from mother to daughter and considered a valuable heirloom. The cost of a sado was reckoned in varahas. Saris are known for their variety by special names, such as Katari, Shilari, Gulabi, etc. Both the Sado and Dharma sado were costly saris, while the Sado was the most expensive, the Dharma Sado was the second most expensive.
f ^{a} ^{b} The Hindus call it mangalsutra or mangala sutra (the auspicious necklace). It is the symbol of the married state. In the olden days, the Mangalsutra was made of black glass beads strung on a thread made of the fibres of dried pineapple leaves. The ordinary crude pattern of the pirduk was improved in the course of time. Later longish beads of gold were inserted between the black glass beads and a pendant was added. The earliest pendant was a round disk of silver. It was called thali. Later it was changed into a golden pendant.

== See also ==
- 2008 anti-Christian attacks in Carnataca
- Catholic Church in India
- Chickmangaloreans
- Christianity in Karnataka
- Christianity in India
- Mangaloreans
- Monti Fest
- Roman Catholicism in Mangalore
- World Konkani Centre

== Bibliography ==
=== References ===
- Abbi, Anvita; Gupta, R. S.; Kidwai, Ayesha (1 January 2001) [1997]. Linguistic Structure and Language Dynamics in South Asia: Papers from the Proceedings of SALA XVIII Roundtable. Delhi: Motilal Banarsidass Publications. p. 440. ISBN 978-81-208-1765-4.
- Asiatic Society of Bombay; Royal Asiatic Society of Great Britain, Ireland Bombay Branch (1853). Journal of the Asiatic Society of Bombay. Vol. 4. Bombay: Bombay Education Society's Press. p. 526. OCLC 17435368.
- Ayyappapanicker, K. (1997). Medieval Indian Literature: An Anthology. New Delhi: Sahitya Akademi. p. 936. ISBN 978-81-260-0365-5.
- Bowring, Lewin B. (1893). Haidar Ali and Tipu Sultan and the Struggle with the Musalman Powers of the South. Oxford: Clarendon Press.
- Buchanan, Francis (1988) [1807]. A Journey from Madras Through the Countries of Mysore, Canara, and Malabar: For the Express Purpose of Investigating the State of Agriculture, Arts and Commerce, the Religion, Manners, and Customs, the History Natural and Civil, and Antiquities. New Delhi: Asian Educational Services. p. 596. ISBN 978-81-206-0386-8.
- Cardona, George (2003). The Indo-Aryan languages. London; New York: Routledge. ISBN 978-0-7007-1130-7.
- Chetti, P. Stephen Basappa (1897). A Guide to Seringapatam and Its Vicinity; Historical and Traditional. Mysore; India: Town Press..
- Choondal, Chummar (1984). Christian theatre in India. Kerala Folklore Academy..
- da Silva Gracias, Fátima (1 January 1996). Kaleidoscope of women in Goa, 1510–1961. New Delhi: Concept Publishing Company. pp. 174. ISBN 978-81-7022-591-1.
- D'Sa, Victor (1972). "The Marriage Customs of the Christians in South Canara (India)" (PDF). Asian Ethnology. 1. 31: 71–87. OCLC 483896283. Archived from the original (PDF) on 20 March 2012.
- D'Souza, Edwin J. F. (2004). V.J.P. Saldanha (Makers of Indian literature). New Delhi: Sahitya Akademi. ISBN 978-81-260-2028-7.
- Farias, Kranti K. (1999). The Christian Impact on South Kanara. Church History Association of India..
- Fernandes, Praxy (1969). Storm over Seringapatam: the Incredible Story of Hyder Ali & Tippu Sultan. Bombay: Thacker. OCLC 89143..
- Forrest, George W. (1887). Selections from the Letters, Despatches, and Other State Papers Preserved in the Bombay Secretariat. Vol. 2. Bombay: Government Central Press. OCLC 868200.
- George, K. M. (2010). Christianity in India Through The Centuries. Authentic Media. ISBN 978-81-7362-786-6..
- George, K. M. (1992). Modern Indian Literature, an Anthology: An Anthology: Surveys and Poems. Vol. I. New Delhi: Sahitya Akademi. ISBN 978-81-7201-324-0.
- Giriappa, S. (1 January 1994). Rural Industrialization in Backward Areas. Delhi: Daya Books. p. 188. ISBN 978-81-7035-125-2.
- Gomes, Olivinho (1987). Village Goa: a study of Goan social structure and change. S. Chand..
- Gupta, Anirudha (1991). Minorities on India's West Coast: History & Society. Delhi: Kalinga Publications. ISBN 978-81-85163-22-2..
- Heras Institute of Indian History and Culture (1988). Indica, Volume 25. Heras Institute of Indian History and Culture, St. Xavier's College (Bombay).
- Heras Institute of Indian History and Culture (1983). Indica. Vol. 20. St. Xavier's College (Bombay).
- Hoehn, Matthew (1952). Catholic authors: contemporary biographical sketches, 1930–1952, Volume 2. St. Mary's Abbey..
- Hunter, William Wilson; James Sutherland Cotton; Richard Burn; William Stevenson Meyer (1909). The Imperial Gazetteer of India. Vol. 11. Great Britain India Office. New Delhi: Clarendon Press. OCLC 313188049.
- Jayadev, Devadas (1996). Christian Missionary Work in Mysore (1648–1947 A.D). Department of Studies in History, University of Mysore.
- Catalani, Jordanus; Yule, Henry (17 August 2001). Mirabilia Descripta: The Wonders of the East. Adamant Media Corporation. p. 116. ISBN 978-1-4021-9555-6.
- Kamath, M. V. (2002). A Reporter at Large. Mumbai: Bharatiya Vidya Bhavan. ISBN 978-81-7276-270-4..
- Kanjamala, Augustine; Catholic Church Bishops' Conference of India, Commission for Proclamation and Communication (1997). Paths of Mission in India Today. Bandra, India: St Pauls BYB. p. 314. ISBN 978-81-7109-286-4.
- Kelley, Gerald B.; Dimock, Edward C.; Kachru, Braj B. (1992). Dimensions of Sociolinguistics in South Asia: Papers in Memory of Gerald B. Kelley. New Delhi: Oxford & IBH Pub. Co. ISBN 978-81-204-0573-8..
- Kurzon, Dennis (2004). Where East Looks West: Success in English in Goa and on the Konkan Coast. Clevedon, England: Multilingual Matters. p. 178. ISBN 978-1-85359-673-5..
- Lobo, Michael (2000). Distinguished Mangalorean Catholics, 1800–2000: A Historico-Biographical Survey of the Mangalorean Catholic Community. Mangalore: Camelot Publishers. ISBN 978-81-87609-01-8.
- Lobo, Michael (1999). Mangaloreans World-wide: An International Directory of the Mangalorean Catholic Community. Manglalore: Camelot Publishers. ISBN 978-81-87609-00-1.
- Maffei, Angelus Francis Xavier (1882). A Konkani Grammar. Mangalore: Basel Mission & Tract Depository. OCLC 14242653..
- Maffei, Angelus Francis Xavier (1883). An English-Konkani Dictionary: And A Konkani-English Dictionary. Mangalore: Basel Mission Press. OCLC 30698920.
  - Maffei, Angelus Francis Xavier (1882b). An English-Konkani Dictionary. Mangalore: Basel Mission Press. pp. 1–174.
  - Maffei, Angelus Francis Xavier (1885). A Konkani-English Dictionary. Mangalore: Basel Mission Press. pp. 575–737.
- Miranda, Rocky V. (1978). "Caste, Religion and Dialect Differentiation in the Konkani Area". International Journal of the Sociology of Language (16): 77–92. doi:10.1515/ijsl.1978.16.77. ISSN 1613-3668. S2CID 144373516.
- Miranda, Rocky V. (1977). "The assimilation of Dravidian loans to Konkani phonological and morphological patterns". Indo-Iranian Journal. 19 (3–4): 247–265. doi:10.1007/BF00183519 (inactive 12 July 2025). ISSN 1572-8536. S2CID 162262924.
- More, J. B. Prashant; Institute for Research in Social Sciences and Humanities of MESHAR. (2006). Rural Industrialization in Backward Areas. Kannur, Kerala: Institute for Research in Social Sciences and Humanities. ISBN 978-81-88432-12-7..
- Naimpalli, Sadanand (2005). Theory and Practice of Tabla. Mumbai: Popular Prakashan. p. 256. ISBN 978-81-7991-149-5.
- Nair, P. Thankappan (2004). South Indians in Kolkata: history of Kannadigas, Konkanis, Malayalees, Tamilians, Telugus, South Indian dishes, and Tippoo Sultan's heirs in Calcutta. Punthi Pustak. ISBN 978-81-86791-50-9..
- Narain, Dhirendra; University of Bombay. Dept. of Sociology, Indian Council of Social Science Research (1989). Research in sociology: abstracts of M.A. and Ph. D. dissertations completed in the Department of Sociology, University of Bombay. New Delhi: Concept Publishing Company. p. 558. ISBN 978-81-7022-235-4.
- Oddie, Geoffrey A. (1991). Hindu and Christian in South-east India: Aspects of Religious Continuity and Change, 1800–1900. London: Routledge. p. 300. ISBN 978-0-913215-55-5.
- Pai, C. C. A.; Supriya (1981). Konknni Huminnyom (Konkani Riddles): an Anthropological Analysis of the Konkany Riddles of Mangalore Catholics. Bangalore: Satabdi Prakasan. OCLC 499573498.
- Panikkar, Kavalam Madhava (1929). Malabar and the Portuguese: Being a History of the Relations of the Portuguese with Malabar from 1500 to 1663. Bombay: D.B. Taraporevala Sons. OCLC 562464118..
- Pastor, Ludwig (Fiherr von) (1978). The history of the popes, from the close of the Middle Ages: drawn from the secret archives of the Vatican and other original sources. Vol. 39. St. Louis: Consortium. OCLC 2036935..
- Pinto, Pius Fidelis (1999). History of Christians in Coastal Karnataka, 1500–1763 A.D. Mangalore: Samanvaya Prakashan..
- Prabhu, Alan Machado (1999). Sarasvati's Children: A History of the Mangalorean Christians. Bangalore: I.J.A. Publications. ISBN 978-81-86778-25-8..
- Prasad, Ram Chandra (1980). Early English Travellers in India: A Study in the Travel Literature of the Elizabethan and Jacobean Periods with Particular Reference to India. Motilal Banarsidass Publications. p. 454. ISBN 9788120824652. OCLC 484435572.
- Gazetteer of the Bombay Presidency. Bombay: Government Central Press. 1883.
- Rodrigues, Francis (2009). Greatest Konkani Song Hits Vol. 1. Pater Publications. ISBN 9780981179407.
- Royal Geographical Society (Great Britain); Royal Geographical Society (Great Britain) (1856). A Gazetteer of the World: Or, Dictionary of Geographical Knowledge, Compiled from the Most Recent Authorities, and Forming a Complete Body of Modern Geography — Physical, Political, Statistical, Historical, and Ethnographical. Edinburgh: A. Fullarton. p. 996. OCLC 20348227.
- Saldanha, Jerome A. (1938), Origin and growth of Konkani or Goan communities and language.
- Sardesai, Manohar Rai (1 January 2000). A History of Konkani Literature: From 1500 to 1992. New Delhi: Sahitya Akademi. p. 336. ISBN 978-81-7201-664-7.
- Scurry, James; Whiteway, William (1824). The Captivity, Sufferings, and Escape of James Scurry, who was Detained a Prisoner During Ten Years, in the Dominions of Hyder Ali and Tippoo Saib. London: H. Fisher. p. 394. OCLC 697909198.
- Sen, Colleen Taylor (2004). Food Culture in India. Westport, Conn: Greenwood Publishing Group. p. 238. ISBN 978-0-313-32487-1.
- Sharma, Renuka M. (1996). Representations of gender, democracy, and identity politics in relation to South Asia. Delhi: Sri Satguru Publications. p. 426. ISBN 978-81-7030-503-3..
- Shastry, Bhagamandala Seetharama; Borges, Charles J. (2000). Goa-Kanara Portuguese relations, 1498–1763. Concept Publishing Company. p. 327. ISBN 978-81-7022-848-6.
- Silva, Severine; Fuchs, Stephan (1965). "The Marriage Customs of the Christians in South Canara, India" (PDF). Asian Ethnology. 2. 24: 1–52. OCLC 483891644. Archived from the original (PDF, 2.48 MB) on 20 March 2012.
- Silva, Severine (1961). History of Christianity in Canara: Issue 3 of Indian Culture and Folklore. Coompta, North Canara: Star of Kanara Press.
- Silva, Severine (1957). History of Christianity in Canara. Vol. I. Coompta, North Canara: Star of Kanara Press.
- Somerset, Playne; Bond, E. W.; Wright, Arnold (2004). Southern India: Its History, People, Commerce, and Industrial Resources. New Delhi: Asian Educational Services. p. 739. ISBN 978-81-206-1344-7.
- "History" (PDF). South Kanara District Gazetteer. Karnataka State Gazetteer. Vol. 12. Bangalore: Gazetteer Department (Government of Karnataka). 1973. pp. 33–85. OCLC 311367277.
- "People" (PDF). South Kanara District Gazetteer. Karnataka State Gazetteer. Vol. 12. Bangalore: Gazetteer Department (Government of Karnataka). 1973. pp. 86–125. OCLC 311367277. Archived from the original (PDF) on 25 March 2009.
- Tour, Maistre de La (1855). The History of Hyder Shah: Alias Hyder Ali Khan Bahadur, and of his Son, Tippoo Sultaun (revised ed.). London: W. Thacker. OCLC 65664006.
- Wellington, Arthur Wellesley; Gurwood, John (1837). The dispatches of Field Marshal the Duke of Wellington : during his various campaigns in India, Denmark, Portugal, Spain, the Low Countries, and France, from 1799 to 1818. Vol. 1. London: John Murray. OCLC 473560768.
- The Gentleman's Magazine. Vol. CIII. F. Jefferies. 1833. p. 610.
- The Oriental Herald. Vol. 3. London: J.M. Richardson. 1824. p. 634.

=== Further reading ===
- Lobo, Michael (2000). The Mangalorean Catholic Community – A Professional History / Directory. Mangalore: Camelot Publishers. ISBN 978-81-87609-02-5.
- Pinto, Pius Fidelis (2004). Canaranthle Konknni Catholic (The Konkani Catholics of Canara) (in Konkani). Mangalore: Samanvaya Prakashan.
- Pinto, Pius Fidelis (1999). Desaantar Thaun Bandhadek – Karavali Karnatakantle Konkani Kristanv (From Migration to Captivity – The Konkani Christians of Canara) (in Konkani). Mangalore: Samanvaya Prakashan.
- Pinto, Pius Fidelis (1999). Konkani Christians of Coastal Karnataka in Anglo-Mysore Relations 1761–1799. Mangalore: Samanvaya Prakashan.
- Prabhu, Mohan. Ancient and Pre-Modern History of the Mangalorean Catholic Community.
- Prabhu, Alan Machado (1999). The captivity of 1784: Re-Appraising Causes & Conclusions. Bangalore: I.J.A. Publications. ISBN 978-81-86778-30-2.
- D'Souza, A.B. (1993). Popular Christianity: A Case Study among the Catholics of Mangalore. PhD thesis. University of Delhi.
- D'Souza, A. L. P. (1983). History of the Catholic Community of South Kanara. Mangalore: Desco Publishers. OCLC 11536326.
