= Mudartha =

Mudartha is a family name and title held by some Mangalorean Catholic Bamonn clans hailing from Udupi district in Karnataka.

The ancestors of the Mudarthas are believed to have originated from the Assagao and Anjuna villages of the Bardez district in northern Goa. In his historical and genealogical work on the Mudarthas, History of the Mudarthas (1996), Prof. Wilfred D'Souza traces the origin of the Mudarthas to the Goud Saraswat Brahmins who gradually migrated from Kashmir to Goa from the 2nd century BC. He states that while the names of these Brahmin ancestors of the Mudarthas are not known, oral tradition has it that their ancestral surname is Prabhu from the male side and Shenoy from the female side.

A legend dictates that one girl from a Shenoy family of Calangute married a boy from a Prabhu family of Assagao, and their family was converted to Roman Catholicism during the middle of the 16th century.

The clan of the original Goud Saraswat Brahmin settlers of Assagao were known as Mudras.^{[a]} According to Sanskrit scholar Prof. C. D. J. Pinto, they belonged to the Smartha sect. The Mudras belonged to the Bharadwaj gotra (clan), and their kuladevata (family deity) was Bhumika-Ravalnath. When the Portuguese began their conversion activities, most Mudras fled with the idols of their families to the North and settled in different parts of southern Maharashtra.^{[b]} Those who remained in Bardez became Catholics and came to be called Mudots.^{[c]} Some Mudots migrated to South Canara to escape a famine in 1591 and settled down first in the Balegundi area of Belman, where they eventually came to known as Mudarthas. Gradually, some of these Mudarthas moved towards Shirva and Moodubelle.

During the 19th and 20th centuries, most of the Mudarthas changed their surname to D'Souza, while a few from Belman still continue to bear the surname. According to Mangalorean genealogist Michael Lobo, the known D'Souza-Mudartha clans include the D'Souza family of Belman; D'Souza family of Bendore; D'Souza family of Kirem; D'Souza family of Moodubelle; D'Souza family of Mulki; D'Souza family of Pakshikere; D'Souza family of Pezar; D'Souza family of Pilar; and the D'Souza family of Shirva.

== Footnotes ==
a While the family tradition of the Mudarthas has it that the original surname of the Mudras was Prabhu, this is denied by the Mudras themselves who assert that their surname has always been as it is.
b Their descendants in North Goa and southern Maharashtra still carry the Mudra surname. Two notable descendants are freedom fighters Rajaram Vaman Mudra and Shashikanta Dattaram Mudra.
c The Mudras who embraced Christianity were called Mudarth by the Hindus and Mudorth by the Christians. However, the Catholic clergy recorded their surnames in the church records as Mudot. Their descendants at present bear Lusitanian surnames such as de Souza.
