= Victor Rodrigues =

Indian writer (1944–2010)

- Born: 8 February 1944; Mangalore, Madras Presidency, British India
- Died: 5 July 2010 (aged 66); Mangalore, Karnataka, India
- Occupations: Novelist, Short story writer
- Spouse: Celine Rodrigues
- Writing career
- Period: 1967–2010
- Genre: Satire
- Subject: Indian society

Victor Rodrigues (8 February 1944 – 5 July 2010) was a Konkani novelist and short story writer from Mangalore, India. He was among the most prominent novelists in the field of Konkani literature. Rodrigues specialised in writing serialised novels of extraordinary length running into more than 150 chapters.

== Early life ==
Victor Rodrigues was born in the Anjelore locality of Mangalore, the eldest child of four children to a Mangalorean Catholic couple, Anthony and Charmine Rodrigues. While he successfully graduated high school, the family's poverty prevented him from enrolling in a college. After his high school graduation, Rodrigues joined Simon & Company and worked as a painter, where he worked for a short period. He then sought a career in painting, after having learnt painting and art from a drawing master of St. Aloysius College named Peter. He received a job at Fr. Mullers Hospital in 1960, where he worked until 1972. Rodrigues later migrated to Bahrain in 1975, where he worked until 1995. He was married to Celine D'Souza. The union lasted until his death and produced three children—Lolita, Veena and Santhosh.

== Literary career ==
While working at Fr. Mullers Hospital, Rodrigues began his literary career writing for Mithr (Friend) and Jhelo (Garland), respectively Konkani weekly and fortnightly. He wrote his first novel Vibhadlelen Gharane (Ruined Family) in 1967 for the Konkani periodicals, Mithr and Jhelo. He wrote his first health related article on the topic of breast cancer which was published on Jhelo. During his literary tenure, Rodrigues wrote 23 novels, the most notable being Andhkarachea Khondkant (Fond of Darkness), Rogtachi Bobatt (Bloodcurdling Screams), Don Max and Paap ani Shiraap (Sin and Curse). His literary works were published in 21 papers and magazines.

Rodrigues's stories highlighted his revolutionary views and were usually directed against perceived social evils and social customs and systems, which he found degrading. He penned his articles with the purpose of creating awareness about social justice. His novel, Pratikar was serialised in the Konkani weekly, Poinnari, for almost 198 weeks, while Paap ani Shiraap ran for 219 weeks. Apart from his novels, he wrote six plays and two biographies of Catholic priests, Fr. Sylvester Menezes and Fr. Marian Fernandes. Rodrigues also wrote a book on traditional medicines, entitled Bholaike Daiz (Treasure of Health). His famous serial story, Paap ani Shiraap was selected by 'Mangalore Tele Films' for the first Konkani TV mega serial. It was telecasted on DD Chandana channel under the title Kanni Ashi Mogachi (A Hopeful Love Story).

Rodrigues was honoured by Karnataka Konkani Sahitya Akademi for his contribution to literature, in the year 2000. He also received the Daiji Dubai Award in 2006, and Francis Danthy Literary Award the same year.

== Bibliography ==
=== Stories ===
- Bonglyanthli Khun (Murder in the Bungalow); published in 1968 by Jhelo.
- Maayakache Bhunyar (Foundation of the Disappearance); published in 1968 by Kannik (Gift).
- Vidhicha Davlenth (In the hands of Destiny); a story of 62 episodes published in 1971 by Mithr.
- Phudarachi Deswat (Destruction of the Future); published in 1972 by Poinnari (Traveller).
- Madthir Sunn (Martyr's Daughter-in-law); published in 1972 on Poinnari.
- Andhkaracha Khandkanth (Fond of Darkness); a story of 81 episodes published in 1973 on Poinnari.
- Shirapachi Bali (Curse of Sacrifice); a story of 127 episodes initially published by Poinnari in 1975, and re-published in the same periodical in 2000.
- Ragtachi Bobaat (Bloodcurdling Screams); a story of 124 episodes published in 1980 on Poinnari.
- Don Max; a story of 64 episodes published in 1982 on Poinnari.
- Dev Boren Karun (God bless you); a story of 33 episodes published in 1984 on Kannik.
- Prathikar (Revenge); a story of 198 episodes which was published in 1986 on Poinnari.
- Charles Shobhraj; a story of 18 episodes which was published in 1986 on Poinnari.
- Paap ani Shirap (Sin and Curse); a story of 129 episodes which was published in 1991 on Poinnari.
- Bhangarachi Istri (Golden Iron Box); a story of 25 episodes published in 1992 on Ummalo (Feelings).
- Haun Parikpon Ghetelin (I will take Revenge); a story of 64 episodes which was published in 1996 on Poinnari.
- Farikpon (Retaliation); a story of 24 episodes which was published in 1998 on Raknno (Guardian).
- Dev Poleta (God will see); a story of 24 episodes which was published in 1998 on Raknno.
- Sukon Gellyo Shelio (The Lost Sheep); a story of 32 episodes published in 2000 on Poinnari.
- Jaathi Bailen Kazar (Marriage out of Caste); published in 1998 by Poinnari.
- Jivatachi Desvat (Destruction of Godliness); a story of 40 episodes published in 2001 on Amchi Maai (Our Mother).
- Ravan Rajyanthlo Veerappan (Veerappan from the Kingdom of Ravana); published in 2002 on Poinnari.

== Bibliography ==
=== References ===
- Sardesai, Manohar Rai (2000). A History of Konkani Literature: From 1500 to 1992. Sahitya Akademi. ISBN 81-7201-664-6.
- George, K.M. (1992). Modern Indian literature, an anthology, Volume 2. Sahitya Akademi. ISBN 978-81-7201-324-0.

=== Further reading ===
- Pinto, Pius Fidelis (2002). Dirvyam Zar – A précis of the literary output in Konkani from the pen of the renowned novelist Victor Rodrigues. Mangalore: Samanvaya Prakashan.
