= Kanara Entrepreneurs, Bangalore =

Kanara Entrepreneurs
- Abbreviation: KE (Kanara Entrepreneurs)
- Formation: 2004
- Type: Non Profit Organisation
- Purpose: Mentor, develop skills and help students, Startups and Entrepreneurs from the Kanara Region
- Members: 400
- Official language: English
- Honorary Chairman: Ivan Fernandes
- KE Bangalore: Clarence Pereira
- KEL Dubai: William D'Souza
- Website: http://keglobal.org

Kanara Entrepreneurs (KE) is a non-profit mutual benefit corporation in the Kanara region of the Indian state Karnataka whose stated mission is to encourage, support, guide, and mentor potential and early-stage entrepreneurs. According to their website, KE aims to provide networking opportunities and counseling to their members. Membership is open to entrepreneurs, senior corporate executives, and senior professionals residing in, or associated with, the Kanara region, and requires an annual fee for admittance.

KE has affiliations with Dimensions in Mumbai and Rachana in Mangalore and has hosted a joint networking event in 2011 at the Hotel Grand Magrath.

KE has signed MOUs (Memorandums of Understanding) with several educational institutions including Christ University in Bangalore, St. Josephs Institute of Management in Bangalore, and St. Aloysius Institute of Management and Information Technology in Mangalore, providing their students with regular hourly sessions with KE members.

In 2014, KE hosted a two-day entrepreneurship convention called Entreprenet held at the Park Plaza Hotel with 400 in attendance, including local entrepreneurs, corporate executives, and the Archbishop of Bangalore.

== Gallery ==
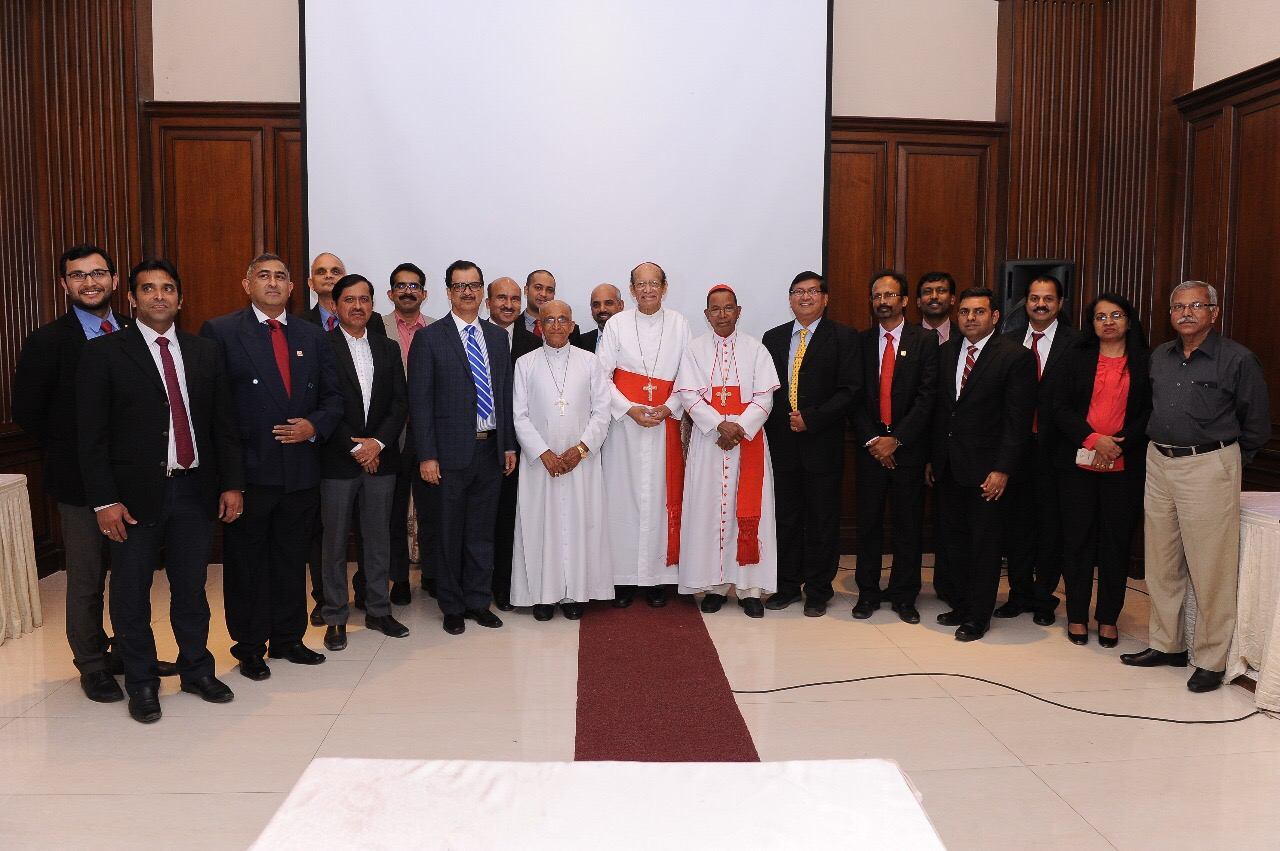
KE Members with Cardinals Oswald Gracias and Telesphore Toppo on 5 February 2018, Bangalore. (Note: From Left to Right: Cyril Pais, Nishan Pereira (Representative - GenNow), Dr. Joseph Rasquinha (Past-Director Membership), Mark D'Souza, Clarence Pereira, Naveen D'Souza, Ivan Fernandes (KE Chairman), Nigel Fernandes (Director Finance), Archbishop Bernard Moras, Ajay Fernandes (Director Marketing), Anil Rego (Past President), Cardinal Gracias, Cardinal Toppo, Adrian D'Souza (KE President), Charles Gomes (President-Elect), Agnel Pereira, Roshan D'Silva (Director Membership) Lawrence Saldanha, Ivy Saldanha (Director Mentoring) and George Timothy.)

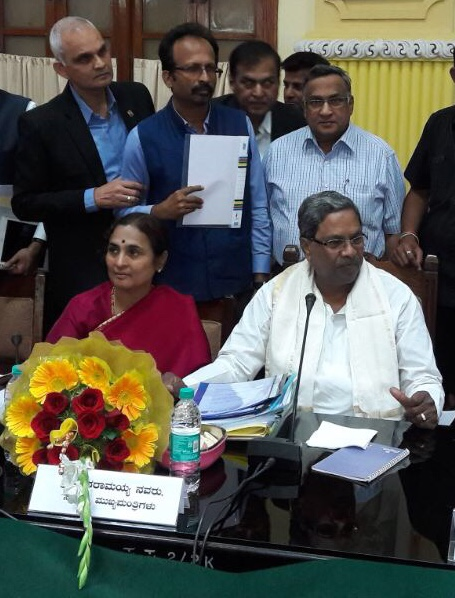
KE Lead Members: Clarence Pereira, Charles Gomes & Valerian Fernandes meeting the Karnataka Chief Minister, Siddaramaiah on 2 February 2018 as part of industry delegation to present proposals for the budget 2018 on behalf of KE

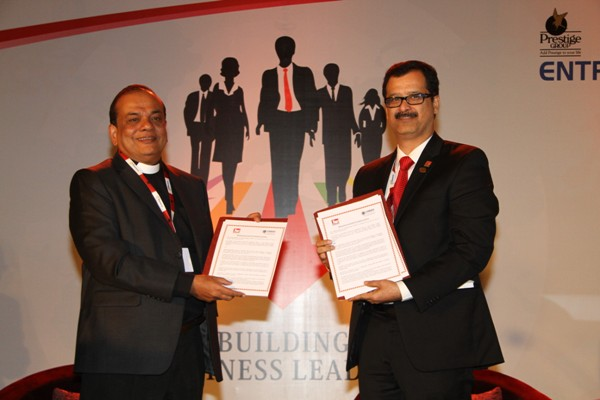
MOU signed by Ivan Fernandes as Chairman of KE Global, and Thomas C. Matthew, CMI, Vice-Chancellor, for Christ University
