= Pius Fidelis Pinto =

Indian priest and research scholar

- Born: 24 April 1960 (age 66); Mangalore, India
- Occupations: Priest, historian, writer
- Writing career
- Genre: History

Pius Fidelis Pinto (born 24 April 1960) is an Indian priest and research scholar of Christianity in Canara, India. He is noted for his research work and publications on the history of Konkani Christians of Dakshina Kannada then erstwhile South Canara. He has written 8 books and presented 36 research papers at various events across the world.

== Biography ==
Pius Fidelis Pinto was born on 24 April 1960 in Gurpur, eight miles north-east of Mangalore, to Frederick Pinto and Stella Pinto (née Lobo). His family is of Mangalorean Catholic descent. He joined the St. Joseph's Seminary in Mangalore in 1975. Pinto completed his Bachelor of Arts (B.A.) degree in 1981 from Mysore University, Master of Arts (M.A.) degree in 1983 from Karnatak University (Dharwad), and Bachelor of Theology (B.Th.) degree in 1986 from Pontifical Urbaniana University (Rome). He was ordained as a priest in 1986. Later, he completed his Doctor of Philosophy (PhD) degree in History in 1998 from Mysore University.

Pinto has done vast research both in India and abroad. He has been awarded research scholarships by Fundação Oriente (Lisbon); Charles Wallace Trust (United Kingdom), and University of Basel (Switzerland). Pinto is fluent in English, Konkani, Kannada, Tulu, Hindi, and can read/write but not speak Portuguese. He is also the managing trustee of Samanvaya Prakashan, Mangalore.

== Works ==
English

- History of Christians in Coastal Karnataka, 1500–1763 A.D. Mangalore: Samanvaya Prakashan. 1999.
- Konkani Christians of Coastal Karnataka in Anglo-Mysore Relations 1761–1799. Mangalore: Samanvaya Prakashan. 1999.
- Dirvyam Zar – A précis of the literary output in Konkani from the pen of the renowned novelist Victor Rodrigues. Mangalore: Samanvaya Prakashan. 2002.

Konkani

- Desaantar Thaun Bandhadek – Karavali Karnatakantle Konkani Kristanv (From Migration to Captivity – The Konkani Christians of Canara). Mangalore: Samanvaya Prakashan. 1999.
- Canaranthle Konknni Catholic (The Konkani Catholics of Canara). Mangalore: Samanvaya Prakashan. 2004.

Kannada

- Karavali Karnatakadalli Kraistara Ithihasa, 1500–1763 A.D. (History of Christians in Coastal Karnataka, 1500–1763 A.D.). Mangalore: Samanvaya Prakashan. 1999.
- Ānglō-Maisūru sambandhada hinneleyalli Karāvali Karnātakada Konkani Kraistaru, 1761–1799 (Konkani Christians of Coastal Karnataka in Anglo-Mysore Relations 1761–1799). Mangalore: Samanvaya Prakashan. 1999.
- Keladi Veerashaiva Nayakaru mattu Kraistaru (Keladi Veerashaiva Nayaks and the Christians). Mangalore: Samanvaya Prakashan. 2004.

== Awards ==
- Jnana Nidhi Puraskar (2000): Presented by Kerala State Konkani Catholics Prathistana, for scientific research work on the history of Konkani Christians of Coastal Karnataka.
- Danti Memorial Award (2000): Presented by Catholic Sabha, Mangalore for the research work entitled Karavali Karnatakadalli Kraistara Ithihasa, 1500–1763 A.D. (1999)
- Dr. T. M. A Pai Award (2001) for the best book in Konkani 2001 in Kannada Script presented by Dr T. M.A Pai Foundation Manipal, Udupi for Desaantar Thaun Bandhadek – Karavali Karnatakantle Konkani Kristanv (1999)
