= Michael Lobo =

Indian scientist and genealogist

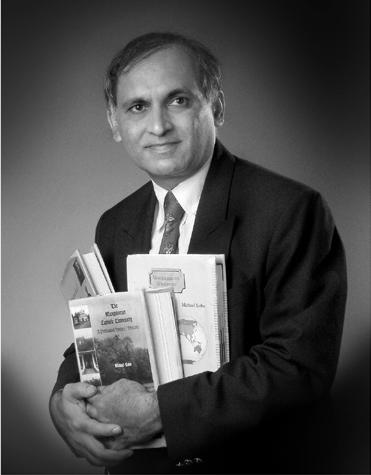
- Born: 12 September 1953 (age 73); Mangalore, Madras State, India
- Occupations: Writer, historian
- Writing career
- Genre: Genealogy

Michael Lobo (born 12 September 1953) is an Indian scientist, writer, and genealogist. He is the author of three self-published books on the Catholic community in Mangalore, India.

== Early life and education ==
Michael Lobo was born in Mangalore, India to Maisie Lobo (née Fernandes) and Camillo Lobo, both of Mangalorean Catholic descent. He belongs to the Bejai branch of the Lobo- Prabhu clan, that has its roots in the Makhale suburb of Kulshekar, Mangalore. Lobo's father was a British Army soldier who served during World War II. He studied at Montfort High School in Yercaud, Tamil Nadu, and graduated from St. Aloysius College. In 1975, he was one of the "National-A" level chess players in the country, which put him among India's top 20 chess players. In 1982, he obtained a PhD from IISc Bangalore, with a degree in applied mathematics. His doctoral thesis on Transonic Aerodynamics earned him the "Young Scientist Award" from the Indian National Science Academy (INSA). In 1982, he earned a PhD in aerodynamics mathematics from the Indian Institute of Science, Bangalore, receiving the 1983 Young Scientist Award from Indian National Science Academy.

== Career ==
=== Academics (1984–1993) ===
In 1984, Lobo moved to England where he entered the Cranfield Institute of Technology on a Commonwealth Scholarship, eventually becoming a faculty member. While employed there, Lobo authored papers on Computational Fluid Dynamics (CFD), including Time Marching – A Step-by-step Guide to a Flow Solver (Ashgate Press, 1997). In his spare time he compiled a 1000-page dictionary of English words derived from Classical Greek and wrote a book on the origins of popular Rock'n'roll songs, but neither was published. He returned to Mangalore in 1993, because of "personal crises".

=== Genealogy (from 1994 onwards) ===
Lobo's interest in genealogy began in 1992, upon his discovery of an antique baptismal register belonging to the period 1810–80 at Milagres Church. While browsing through this register, he discovered the birth record of his great-grandfather, Anthony Peter Lobo. The record traced his parentage to Lawrence Lobo (a Munsiff and eminent member of the 19th century Mangalorean Catholic community) and Ignatia Tellis. He then subsequently scoured the register to locate the birth records of the other children of Lawrence and Ignatia.

This register became the nucleus of his first genealogical project—a biographical compilation of all the descendants of Lawrence Lobo (through both male and female lines of descent). From late 1992 to late 1993, Lobo began working during his spare time on this project, and by the end of 1993, had completed the first draft of his genealogical work on the Lobo-Prabhus of Makhale and their related families. After the end of his contract at the Cranfield Institute of Technology, rather than renew his contract or pursue a contract elsewhere, Lobo decided to give up his mathematical career and pursue a personal project to write the history and genealogy of the Mangalorean Catholic families.

He moved to Mangalore in 1994, and settled down in his family manor "Camelot Residency" on Bijai church road. During 1994–95, Lobo was involved, on a full-time basis, on a research project on the history and genealogy of the Catholic community of Mangalore. He copied almost every 19th century baptismal, marriage and death record he could locate at Rosario Cathedral and Milagres Church, cataloguing them according to surnames. Lobo initially experienced difficulties in the project since only the baptismal registers were maintained in reasonably good condition, while large sections of the marriage and death registers were missing, and it was not feasible to build the genealogy of any family on the basis of baptismal records alone.

However, he had access to other sources of information on the major families, such as the Vas-Naiks of Falnir (the first published work on the genealogy of a Mangalorean Catholic family), Mascarenhas-Prabhus of Falnir, and the Fernandes-Prabhus of Tonse. There were also unpublished genealogies of various other families, most of them written by Mangalorean genealogists Rao Saheb Francis Xavier Lobo and Marian Saldanha. The project took shape as A Genealogical Encyclopaedia of Mangalorean Catholic Families. Lobo also conducted and still conducts personal interviews with many Mangalorean Catholics, who have settled in Bangalore, Mumbai, Chennai, Delhi and various other parts of India and abroad. This work is expected to be about 8 to 10 volumes and as of March 2011, had already crossed 7000 pages.

Although his work is unfinished, Lobo has self-published three offshoots on the subject: Mangaloreans Worldwide – An International Directory (1999), Distinguished Mangalorean Catholics 1800–2000 – A Historico-Biographical Survey of the Mangalorean Catholic Community (2000), and The Mangalorean Catholic Community – A Professional History / Directory (2002). His encyclopaedia covers more than a thousand families and is being continually updated with names and records of new families. He claims that the Mangalorean Catholic community has the distinction of being the only community in the world to possess its own genealogical encyclopaedia.

Lobo has also authored two books on music entitled A Hundred Pages of Classics, Opera and Popular Instrumental Pieces – A Thousand Pages of Songs with Historical Notes and its companion edition Popular Music – A Historical and Thematic Analysis, both of which were released in 2011.

== Works ==
- Time Marching – A Step-by-step Guide to a Flow Solver. Ashgate Press. 1997. ISBN 978-0-291-39826-0.
- Mangaloreans world-wide: an international directory of the Mangalorean Catholic community. Camelot Publishers. 1999. ISBN 978-81-87609-00-1.
- Distinguished Mangalorean Catholics 1800–2000 – A Historico-Biographical Survey of the Mangalorean Catholic Community. Camelot Publishers. 2000. ISBN 978-81-87609-01-8.
- Lobo, Michael (2002). The Mangalorean Catholic Community – A Professional History / Directory. ISBN 978-81-87609-02-5.
- A Hundred Pages of Classics, Opera and Popular Instrumental Pieces – A Thousand Pages of Songs with Historical Notes. 2011.
- Popular Music – A Historical and Thematic Analysis. 2011. ISBN 978-81-87609-08-7.
- Memories to treasure, 2024.
