= Madval =

Washerman community in Konkan region

Madval, sometimes also known as Dhobi, is a washerman community of Goa and rest of the Konkan. They claim to be Rajakas.The occupation of washermen is hereditary. The services of washermen are essential for the people of the urban as well as rural areas alike. They have their own localities which are sometimes gifted to them by the temples for the services they render and agriculture farmers.

Maddval refers to a traditional community life and cultural practices observed in the Mahad region of the Konkan in western India. The traditions reflect a blend of Hindu and Muslim influences, with both groups living in close association.

== Daily life and traditions ==
The people of Mahad are described as leading a simple and content lifestyle. They value honesty and place importance on community harmony. Folk songs known as barya barop are sung in rhythm with swords and shields. Village leadership is associated with a figure called the mahalkar. Marriage customs are modest, with ceremonies involving a bhak (feast) and devan (worship). Newly married couples are often given a house, and the mahalkar plays an active role in the process. Festivals are occasions for communal gathering, including the Diwali dance known as Halkhakkol. Local religious life also includes the worship of the deity mahaddevakka.

== Social structure ==
The community includes a variety of castes and sub-castes such as Dholak, Chandkar, and Lingayat, each with distinct occupational associations. Despite caste divisions, social relations among the groups are generally cooperative. Communal feasts are a notable practice, where people from different backgrounds share food and resources.

== Religious practices ==
The religious life of the community is marked by devotion to multiple deities. These include Bahiroba, Khandoba, Mhasoba, Bhavani, and other village deities (gramdevatas). Worship involves rituals such as ghadyacha and paydhach. Sacred spaces like devghar (temples) and devraan (sacred groves) are constructed and maintained by the community. Traditions such as halka hakkol are also associated with local religious observances.

== Community values ==
The people of Mahad are noted for their hospitality and willingness to assist others. Festivals and religious observances often reinforce this communal spirit. The traditions of Maddval thus highlight cooperation, shared resources, and respect for longstanding customs.
