= Shirva, India =

Shirva
- Village
- Location in Tulu Nadu, India Shirva (India)
- Coordinates: 13.2465°N 74.84445°E
- Country: India
- State: Karnataka
- District: Udupi

Languages
  - Official: Kannada
- Time zone: UTC+5:30 (IST)
- Postal code: 574116
- ISO 3166 code: IN-KA
- Vehicle registration: KA 20
- Nearest city: Udupi
- Website: karnataka.gov.in

Shirva is a village in Udupi district of Karnataka in India.

== Demographics ==
According to Census 2011 information the location code or village code of Shirva village is 608825. Shirva village is located in Udupi taluka of Udupi district in Karnataka, India. It is situated 15km away from Udupi, which is both district & sub-district headquarter of Shirva village. As per 2009 stats, Shirva village is also a gram panchayat.

The total geographical area of village is 3216.13 hectares. Shirva has a total population of 13,396 peoples, out of which male population is 6,328 while female population is 7,068. Literacy rate is 82.76% out of which 85.64% males and 80.18% females are literate. There are about 3,183 houses. Pincode of Shirva village locality is 574116.

== Health ==
=== Our Lady of Health Church, Shirva ===
Our Lady of Health Church, which recently celebrated its 100th anniversary, is renowned for its Gothic architecture. The altar had beautiful Roman styled paintings, which were replaced with newer paintings during renovation.

== Notable people ==
- Dayanand Shetty, actor
