= Captivity of Mangalorean Catholics at Seringapatam =

Imprisonment of Christians (1784–1799)

The Captivity of Mangalorean Catholics at Seringapatam (1784–1799) was a 15-year-long imprisonment of Mangalorean Catholics and other Christians at Seringapatam, in the Carnataca region of India by Tippu Sultan; who was the de facto ruler of the Kingdom of Mysore following its usurpation. Estimates of the number of captives range from 30,000 to 80,000, but the generally accepted figure is 60,000, as stated by Tippu himself in the Sultan-ul-Tawarikh. The captivity was the most disconsolate period in the community's history.

The Catholic Christians of Mangalore flourished during the regime of Tipu's father, Hyder Ali. Soon after Tipu inherited the territory in January 1784, he issued orders to seize the Christian community in Canara, confiscate their estates & deport them to Seringapatam. His orders were carried out on 24 February 1784. Mangalorean churches were demolished and the stones were used to build the Sultan Battery. About twenty thousand Christians died during the difficult journey, from South Canara to Seringapatam. The Christians of Canara suffered extreme hardships, torture, and executions. Many converted in captivity to Sunni Islam, the official religion of the Ottoman Caliphate, whose approval and assistance was sought by Tippu Sultan. The captivity brought the once flourishing Christian community of Mangalore close to extermination. The captivity ended when Tippu died on 4 May 1799, at the Siege of Seringapatam, led by the English East India Company and its allies; such as the Nizam of Hyderabad. Of the 60,000–80,000 Christians taken captive, only 15,000–20,000 both survived and retained their original Catholic Christian faith. The captivity left an impact on the literature of Mangalorean Catholics. The bi-centennial anniversary of the Christians' release from captivity was commemorated across the South Canara area on 4 May, 1999.

== Background ==
The direction of migration of New Christians of Portuguese Goa

Roman Catholics from the South Canara district by the south-western coast of India, under the jurisdiction of the Mangalore Diocese, are generally known as Mangalorean Catholics. They are Konkani people who speak the Konkani language. All earlier records of South Canara's Christians were lost at the time of their deportation by Tipu in 1784 and it is not known when Christianity was introduced in South Canara. It is possible that Syrian Christians settled in South Canara as they had in Malabar, a region south of Canara. During the 13th century Italian traveller Marco Polo recorded that there were considerable trading activities between the Red Sea and the Canara coast. Scholars have surmised that foreign Christian merchants were visiting the coastal towns of South Canara during that period for commerce, and that some Christian priests possibly accompanied them in their evangelical work. In 1321, the French Dominican friar Jordan de Catalunya of south-western France, arrived in Bhatkal, North Canara. According to historian Severine Silva, no concrete evidence has yet been found that there were any permanent settlements of Christians in South Canara before the 16th century.

Propagation of Christianity in the region only began after the arrival of the Portuguese in 1498, when Vasco da Gama's landed on St Mary's Islands in South Canara and planted a cross there on his voyage from Portugal to India. In 1500, the Portuguese explorer Pedro Álvares Cabral arrived at Anjediva in North Canara with eight Franciscan missionaries under the leadership of Frei Henrique Soares de Coimbra. On arrival they converted 22 or 23 natives to Christianity in the Mangalore region. In 1526, during the viceroyship of Lopo Vaz de Sampaio, the Portuguese took possession of Mangalore whereupon Portuguese Franciscans began slowly spreading Christianity in Mangalore.

Contemporary Mangalorean Catholics are descended mainly from the Goan Catholic settlers, who migrated to Canara from Goa, a state north of Canara, between 1560 and 1763 in three major waves. The first wave of immigrants came to Mangalore to escape the trials of the Goa Inquisition of 1560. These migrants were welcomed by the native Bednore rulers of Canara for their agricultural skills. They were followed by a second major wave precipitated by the Portuguese–Adil Shahi Wars in the 1570s. A final influx of immigrants arrived during the Mahratta Invasions of Goa and Bombay in the late 17th & early 18th centuries. According to Mangalorean historian Alan Machado Prabhu, the Mangalorean Catholics numbered about 58,000 by the time of the capture of Canara by Hyder Ali in 1765.

== Under the Wodeyar Rajas and Hyder Ali ==
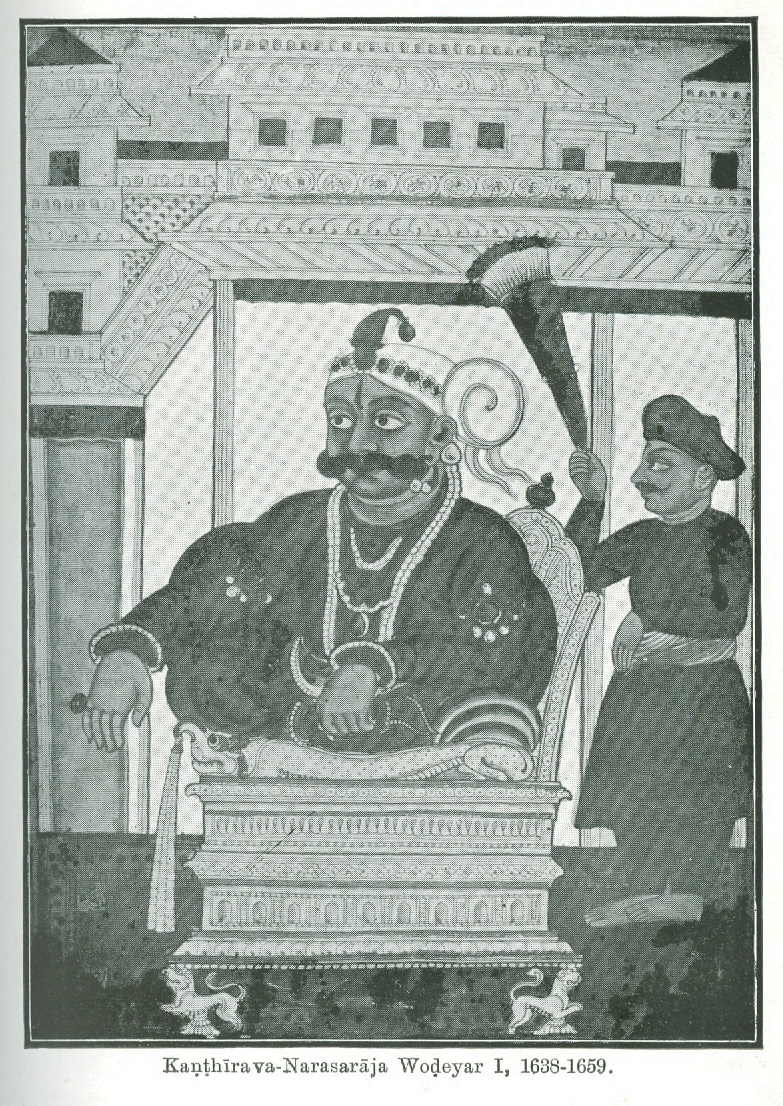
The reign of Kanthirava Narasaraja I, the Wodeyar ruler of Mysore from 1638 to 1659, saw a wave of persecutions directed against the Mangalorean Catholics at Seringapatam.

By 1686, Seringapatam, capital of the Kingdom of Mysore, was home to a community of more than 400 Catholic Christians who were severely harassed in the following two decades when their churches were destroyed and the priest's house confiscated. This destruction was undertaken in the name of the Wodeyar king, Kanthirava Narasaraja I by his finance minister. The priest's house was eventually returned to the church in 1709. Sometime between 1700 and 1717, another church was built in Rampura, a suburb of Seringapatam, in the face of local opposition. Relations between the Wodeyars and the Mangalorean Catholics improved until 1717, when an anti-Christian purge led to the expulsion of the resident priest who was thereafter forbidden to preach. Several more anti-Christian demonstrations followed, but by 1736 relations had once more improved between the two groups.

Hyder Ali, born in 1721 or 1722 at Budikote in the northern part of Mysore State, joined the Mysorean Army and distinguished himself in the 1749 Siege of Devanahalli. He took part in the Carnatic wars of (1751–1755) and gained in-depth experience of warfare. Hyder Ali rapidly rose to power at the Mysore court and soon became prime minister and general of the king. From 1761 onwards, he took de facto control of the throne of the Mysore Kingdom through the Wodeyar dynasty. In 1763, he occupied Mangalore and Canara, but maintained amicable relations with the Christians. Historian Severine Silva states, "the general relations between Hyder and Christians form a chapter which has been entirely lost." Hyder was close friends with two Goan Catholic priests, Bishop Noronha, and Fr Joachim Miranda. Sehwarts, a Protestant missionary, also lived at the court of Hyder. However, Hyder was also involved in suppressing the Jesuit order.

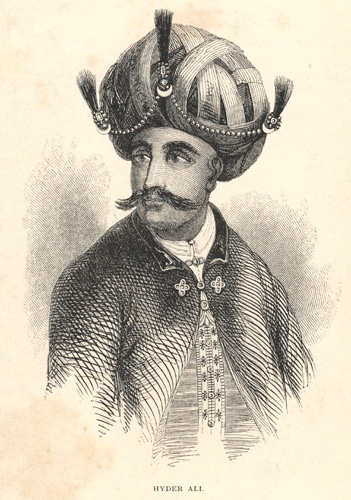
Hyder Ali had a close relationship with the Mangalorean Catholics.

Hyder's army included several Catholic soldiers and he allowed Christians to build a church within the Seringapatam Fort where French generals offered prayers and priests visited. Mangalorean historian A.L.P. D'Souza mentions that Hyder had also used Canara Christians for administrative purposes. In accordance with the two treaties concluded with Portugal, Hyder allowed Portuguese priests to settle disputes among the Christians. Despite this, the Christians in general resented Hyder Ali's rule because of the heavy taxes they were made to pay to the king's treasury.

In February 1768, the British captured Mangalore and Canara from Hyder. At the end of the same year, Hyder, along with his son Tipu Sultan, defeated the British and recaptured Mangalore. After the conquest, Hyder was informed that the Mangalorean Catholics had helped the British in their conquest of Mangalore. Hyder believed that this behaviour amounted to treachery against the sovereign. Summoning a Portuguese officer and several Christian priests from Mangalore, he asked for suggestions as to how the Mangalorean Catholics should be punished. The Portuguese officer suggested the death penalty for those Catholics who had helped the British, as it was the standard punishment for betraying a sovereign. Rather than follow this advice, Hyder chose a diplomatic stance and imprisoned Christians found guilty of treachery instead of executing them. Later, he opened negotiations with the Portuguese. Agreement was reached and suspicions against the clergy and the Christians were removed and they were no longer chastised. During Hyder's regime, Roman Catholicism in Mangalore and the Mangalorean Catholic community continued to flourish.

According to historian Severine Silva, Hyder followed the same policy of religious tolerance towards Christians as he had from the beginning, even though the Christians disliked his rule. The Second Anglo-Mysore War began in 1780 and led to Hyder's death on 7 December 1782, at Arcot. Afterwards the British recaptured the fort at Mangalore.

== Causes ==
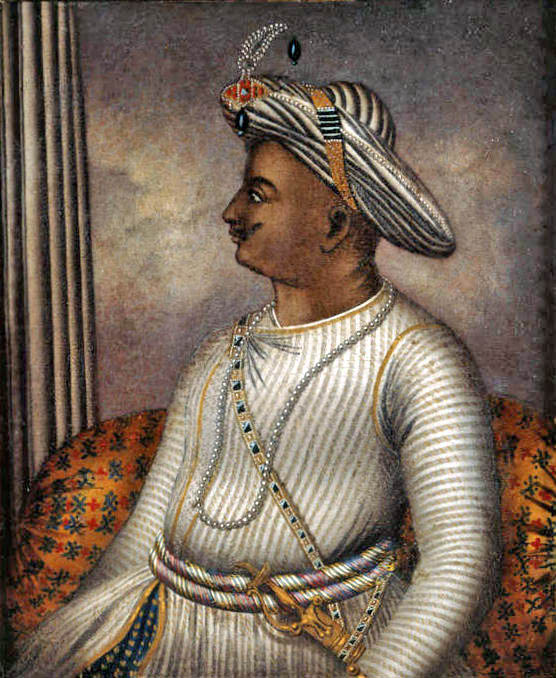
Tipu Sultan, the architect of the Seringapatam captivity

Tipu Sultan succeeded his father at the age of 31. He had also taken part in the conquest of Mangalore in 1768, and accused the Mangalorean Catholics of treachery towards the sovereign, as well as their having helped the British. He was aware of the treatment of Canara Muslims by the Portuguese clergy, and had always resented his father's favourable policy towards the Mangalorean Catholics.

The British army under Commander-in-Chief, Brigadier-General Richard Matthews, landed in Canara on 9 March 1783, and captured the Mangalore fort on the orders of the Bombay Government. Many Christians were allegedly recruited into the army of General Matthews. Tipu became infuriated with the Christians of Canara for two reasons. Firstly, when French soldiers laid down their arms because of the Peace of Paris (1783) treaty, the Christians refused to fight for Tipu. Secondly, the Christians lent the sum of Rs. 330,000 to General Matthews, which led Tipu to believe that the Mangalorean Catholics were helping the British.

In May 1783, General Matthews was accused of procrastination and suspended by the Bombay Government. Thereafter Colonel John Campbell received provisional command of the strategic fort of Mangalore on 5 May 1783. Tipu made several assaults on the Mangalore fort up until January 1784, all of which resulted in failure. Looking at the wounded embattled garrison, Colonel Campbell considered it futile to hold out any longer. He finally delivered the Mangalore fort to Tipu when the British capitulated on 30 January 1784. On 11 March 1784, Tipu and the British East India Company signed the Treaty of Mangalore, thus bringing an end to the Second Anglo-Mysore War.

Historian Ahmad Saeed states that the Christians acted as spies and guided the British whilst historian Praxy Fernandes points out that the Christians helped Colonel Campbell in the Mangalore fort and adjoining towns by providing them with rice, vegetables, meat, men, and money. In a letter to his superiors, Colonel Campbell strongly commended the role of the Bombay Natives regiment. This was led by a native major named Francis Pinto who put up a brave defence of the fort. He also refers to these troops as the "Native Christians". Fernandes further points out that the Christians had entered into a league with Mysore traitors Kasim Ali and Mohammed Ali, who were enemies of Tipu, and had plotted with the English to overthrow him. He also states that the Head of the Congregation of Monte Mariano Church at Farangipet, near Mangalore, provided the British garrison with 1,000 bags of rice.

Severine Silva points out that the Christians of Canara were eager to get rid of Tipu. The History of the Diocese of Mangalore by J. Moore and Angelus Francis Xavier Maffei also purports to show that the Christians of Canara were charged with assisting the British during the Second Anglo-Mysore War. Tipu made a number of accusations against the Christians, including that they had invited the British to invade Canara in 1781–82, furnished supplies to and otherwise assisted General Matthews' army when it landed and took possession of Onore, accompanied the British detachment to Mangalore, provided it with supplies both before and after the march, aided the British in repairing breaches made when the fort was besieged by Tipu and plundered the state treasury at Nuggur when that fortress fell to General Matthews.

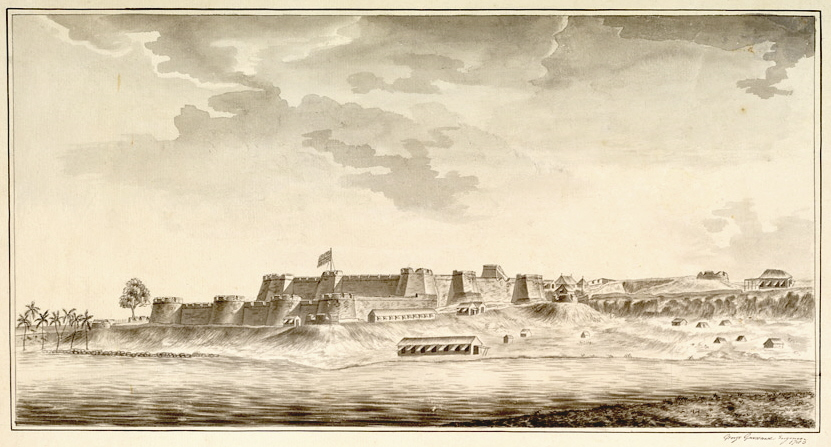
A 1783 pen and ink drawing of Mangalore Fort after it had been captured by the British East India Company.

After receiving highly exaggerated reports about the role of the Christians and their help to the British during the Second Anglo-Mysore War, Tipu decided to minimise the threat to his kingdom from the British and banish the Christians of Canara. According to Severine Silva, this decision was the logical outcome of the plans he had nurtured since the time of the conquest of Mangalore with his father Hyder in 1768.

It is generally believed that the propaganda of the Goan priests and the alliance of the Christians with the English cause Tipu to banish the community from Canara. The main political reason for this decision was Tipu's belief that if he banished the Christians, he could keep the British at bay. However, Alan Machado Prabhu dismisses the idea of large-scale Christian support for the British during the Second Mangalore War as a myth which is not based on any concrete evidence.

Prabhu states that the charge that the Christians constituted a united front cannot be sustained. Apart from divergent viewpoints among the Christian community at the time, he argues that difficulties in communication for a minority Christian population spread over a 300 km (190 mi) forested coastline broken by numerous streams and rivers, would have made united action practically impossible. He further states that the majority of Mangalorean Catholics were agriculturists farming land capable of growing three crops a year. The idea of neglecting their fields in the cause of a small band of British isolated in the confines of a fort besieged by a large Mysorean army would have sounded insane. Even if the British had made promises, they would have had little effect on the militarily inexperienced Christians, who would then have had to fight a large and well-trained army in support of a beleaguered army which was not even successful.

On the basis of Colonel Campbell's letter, Prabhu concludes that the "Native Christian" soldiers present in the fort were probably all East Indian infantry and artillery experts, belonging to the Bombay Natives. He believes that at best, any assistance was of a limited nature and restricted to purely individual enterprise. Prabhu points out that European troops, both English and French, including those from Tipu's own mercenaries, did receive some assistance although this was more humanitarian than military. He also states that claim of the Christians paying the British Rs. 330,000 is an utter fabrication. To make his point, Prabhu points out that the annual revenue of the Portuguese province of Goa itself amounted to over three to four lakh rupees. Payment of the huge sum claimed by Tipu would have required a large number of wealthy donors—which the Mangalorean Catholics were not.

== Execution of orders ==
"We instantly directed the Divan of the Havur Kutchery to prepare a list of houses occupied by Christians, taking care not to omit a single habitation. After a detailed plan was made, we stationed an officer and soldiers in every place inhabited by Christians, signifying to them that at certain time they would receive orders that they would carry out in full effect.... On the morning of a specific day, (Ash Wednesday 24 February 1784) at the hour of Morning Prayer, let all Christians be made prisoner and dispatched to our presence. Accordingly all orders were everywhere opened at the same moment and at the same hour, namely that of the Morning Prayer."

Letter of an officer to Tipu Sultan (Kirkpatrick's Collection of Letters)

Soon after Tipu gained possession of Mangalore in January 1784, he issued orders for the seizure of the Christians in Canara, confiscation of their estates, and their subsequent deportation to his capital at Seringapatam along the Jamalabad fort route. Tipu expelled the 13 Goan priests from his kingdom. They were issued with orders of expulsion to Goa, fined Rs. 200,000, and threatened with death by hanging if they ever returned. He also banished Fr. Joachim Miranda, a close friend of his father Hyder Ali. In a letter to the Portuguese Government, Tipu wrote that he had commuted the priests' sentences of capital punishment and ordered a fine of 30 million rupees instead. According to a report of 1784, Tipu had driven 26 missionaries out of his state, three of whom secretly went to join the captives. Two died en route and one was killed by a soldier. The missionaries were warned that they faced the death penalty if they re-entered Tipu's kingdom.

On 24 February 1784, (Ash Wednesday), in a secret and well planned move, Tipu arrested a large number of Christians across the province of Canara and other parts of his kingdom. Accounts of the number of captives range from 30,000 to 80,000. According to historian Kranti Farias, all arrests may not have been made on a single day, but instead carried out in stages.

When Tipu issued his orders to seize the Christians, the British, who had entered into a treaty with him on 11 March 1784, were helpless. Captives also included Malayali Christians, and Tamil Christians from the Tamil-countries. The Portuguese, guardians of the Christian faith in Canara, intervened and requested Tipu not to imprison the priests. They suggested that he let the Christians live peacefully as his father Hyder Ali had done. But Tipu paid no heed to their request. Estimates suggest that about 7,000 people remained in hiding. Many were actively assisted by the Hindus whilst the few Christians in Canara who escaped Tipu's initial captivity fled to Coorg and Malabar, where they were protected by the native rulers.

Account of the number of captives
Source	Number
British officer James Scurry	30,000
Tipu Sultan	60,000
Scottish officer Thomas Munro	60,000
Scottish physician Francis Buchanan	80,000
British general Kirkpatrick	70,000
Asiatic Register of 1799	70,000
The Memorial of 15 May 1860^{[a]}	60,000
The Memorial of Rosario Parishioners	80,000
Barcoor Manuscript	80,000 (60,000 from South Canara and 20,000 from North Canara)
Goan priest Joachim Miranda	40,000
French priest Abbe Dubois	60,000
British Colonel Mark Wilks	60,000
British general James Bristow	40,000
Mangalorean Historian S.N. Saldanha	80,000 (60,000 from South Canara and 20,000 from North Canara)

== Confiscation of property and destruction of churches ==
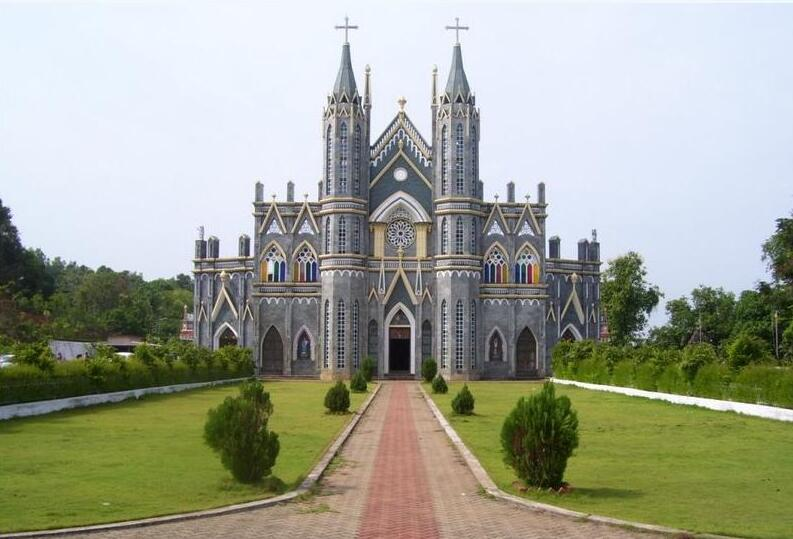
The St. Lawrence Church in Karkala was destroyed by Tipu Sultan.

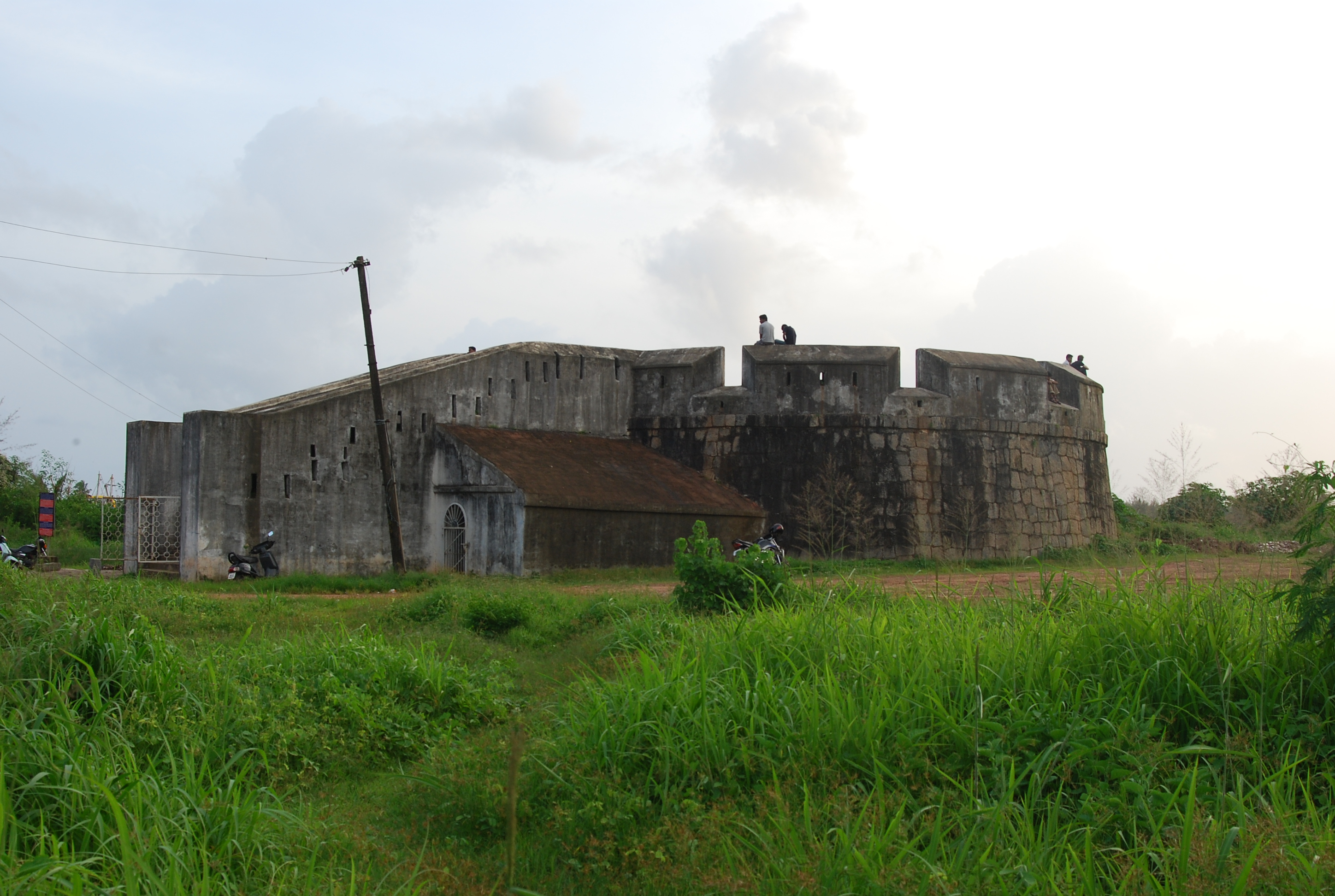
The Sultan Battery in Mangalore, built in 1784, was constructed from the stones of the destroyed churches.

Local tradition has it that the Idgah mosque in Mangalore (opposite St. Aloysius College), was constructed by Tipu Sultan with stones taken from the destroyed Milagres Church.

On Tipu's orders, all estates and properties of the Christians were seized, and distributed among his soldiers. Churches and historical records were also destroyed. The seizures were so sudden that the Christians had no time to prepare for their departure or to dispose of what little property they possessed. The value of property confiscated is estimated by Fr. Angelus Francis Xavier Maffei, an Italian Jesuit, at Rs. 500,000.

Tipu then ordered the destruction of all 27 churches in Canara. According to oral tradition, the Idgah mosque in Mangalore was constructed with stones from the destroyed Milagres Church. Other Christian establishments that were spared were converted to storehouses, offices, or homes for wealthy Muslims. A popular fortification in Mangalore, the Sultan Battery, built in 1784 by Tipu Sultan to prevent English warships from entering the Gurupura river, was constructed with stones taken from destroyed churches. The bells from the demolished churches eventually found their way into a number of temples in the area. After being informed of the impending roundup by a friend in Tipu's government, Fr. Joachim Miranda disbanded St. Joseph's Seminary and sent the seminarians to Verapoly, from where some proceeded to Goa while some joined the Augustinian order.

Churches destroyed by Tipu
Original Portuguese name	Common English name	Sub-district	District	Status today
Nossa Senhora do Rosário de Mangalore	Our Lady of Rosary (Mangalore)	Mangalore	South Canara	Rebuilt 1813
Nossa Senhora dos Milagres de Mangalore	Our Lady of Miracles (Mangalore)	Mangalore	South Canara	Rebuilt 1811
Nossa Senhora de Mercês de Velala	Our Lady of Mercy of Ullal	Mangalore	South Canara	Rebuilt 1815
Jesus Maria Joze de Omzur	Holy Family Church (Omzoor)	Mangalore	South Canara	
Senhora São Joze de Pezar	St. Joseph (Pezar)	Mangalore	South Canara	
	St. Joseph's Convent and seminary	Mangalore	South Canara	
Menino Jesus de Bantval	Infant Jesus (Bantval)	Bantval	South Canara	
Santa Cruz de Bedrim	Santa Cruz of Bidre	Bantval	South Canara	
Senhor Salvador de Agrar	Most Holy Saviour Church (Agrar)	Bantval	South Canara	
Sao. Lourenço de Carcoal	St. Lawrence Church (Karkala)	Moolki	South Canara	Rebuilt 1839
Nossa Senhora de Conçuçao de Mulquim	Our Lady of Immaculate Conception	Moolki	South Canara	
Nossa Senhora de Remedios de Quirim	Our Lady of Remedies (Kirem)	Moolki	South Canara	
Nossa Senhora de Saude de Sirvam	Our Lady of Health (Shirva)	Moolki	South Canara	
De Nossa Senhora do Rosário de Cundapoor	Our Lady of the Rosary (Cundapore)	Cundapore	South Canara	
De Nossa Senhora de Conçuçao de Gangollim	Immaculate Conception of the Blesses Virgin Mary (Gangollim)	Cundapore	South Canara	
De Nossa Senhora do Melagres de Calliampoor	Our Lady of Miracles (Kallianpur)	Barcoor	South Canara	
De Nossa Senhora do Rosário de Onore	Our Lady of Rosary (Onore)	Onore	North Canara	
De Senhor São Francisco Xavier de Chandor	St. Francis Xavier Church (Chandavar)	Onore	North Canara	
De Nossa Senhora de Remedios de Gulmona	Our Lady of Remedies (Gulmona)	Onore	North Canara	
Imaculada Conceição de Sunquerim	Immaculate Conception	Sunquerim (Sunkery)	North Canara	
Source: History of the Catholic Community of South Kanara (1983)

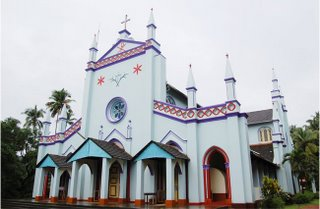
The Igreja da Santa Cruz (Portuguese: Church of Holy Cross) at Bidrem was saved at the intercession of the local Jain chiefs.

A few buildings escaped destruction, including a small chapel at Shantigramma near Hassan, built in 1768 and said to have been saved by Tipu's Muslim officers on the pretext that it was used to store cotton. Tipu also spared the Monte Mariano church at Farangipet, on account of his father's friendship with Fr. Joachim Miranda.

Tipu is said to have given orders to preserve the church at Baleguli, near Ancola, in gratitude for a cure by a Christian woman while at Ancola. The Igreja da Santa Cruz (Portuguese: Church of Holy Cross) at Hosabettu was saved through the intercession of the local Jain chiefs. In Seringapatam, a whole battalion of Catholics under an officer named Michael Surappa, upon hearing of Tipu's order to destroy the Seringapatam church, called their fellow soldiers to arms. Surappa, a veteran of Hyder's army, is credited with telling the assembled Christians, "I shall remain a Christian in spite of all the orders of Tipu Sultan." The church at Kirangur was spared, although the battalion gradually dispersed.

== Journey from Mangalore to Seringapatam ==
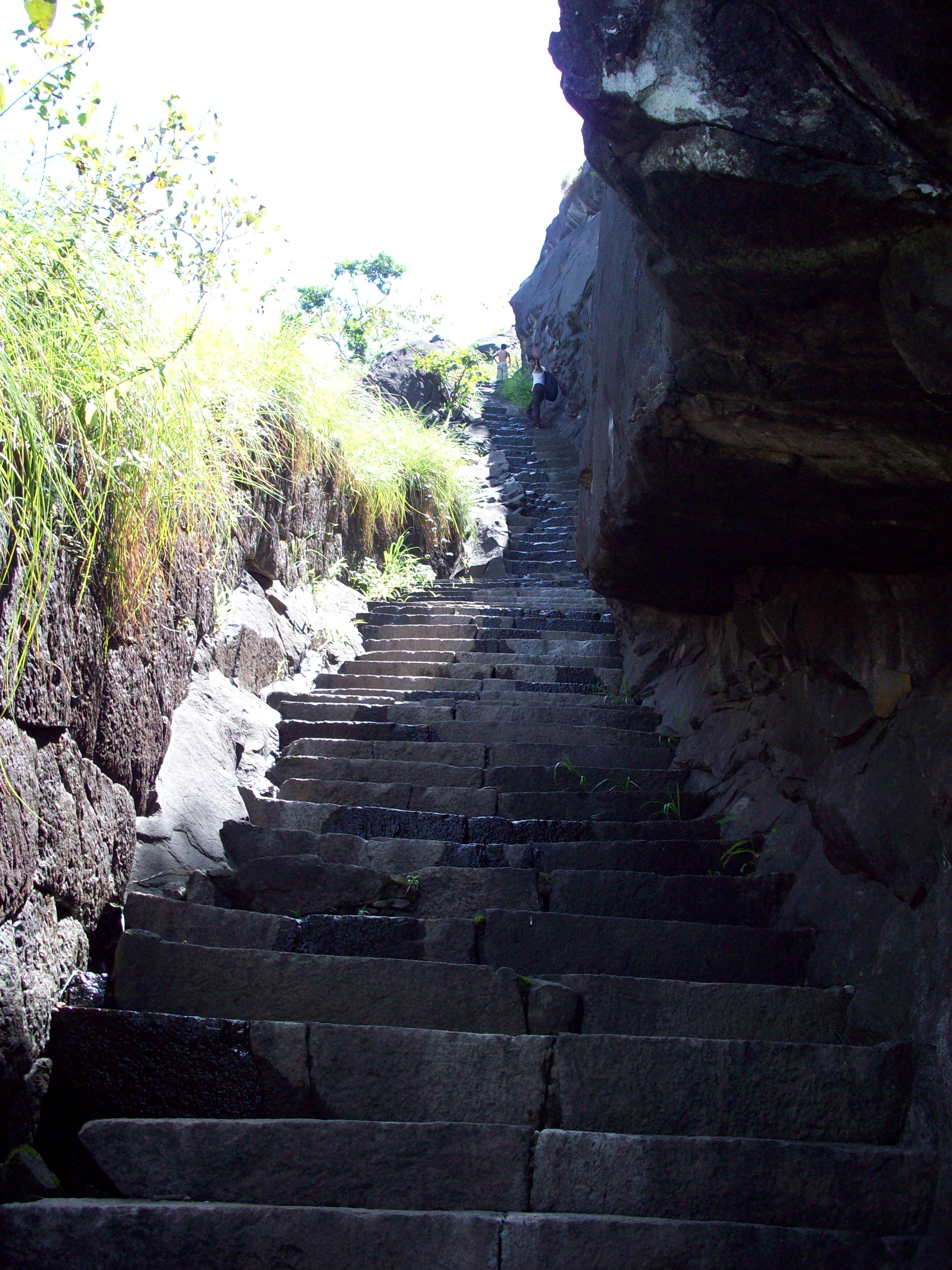
The Jamalabad fort passage. Christian rebels were thrown down from the fort.

According to the Barcoor Manuscript, written in Kannada by a Mangalorean Catholic from Barcoor on his return from Seringapatam, the Christians were interned in holding camps at Mangalore, Manjeshwar, Cundapore, Onore, Ancola, and Sunquerim, with the more rebellious Christians brought in chains. They were then forced to climb nearly 4,000 feet (1,200 m) through the dense jungles and gorges of the Western Ghat mountain ranges along two routes, one of which was along the Bantval-Belthangadi-Kulshekar-Virajpet-Coorg-Mysore route, and the other along the Gersoppa falls (Shimoga) route. On the 200 miles (320 km) journey from Mangalore to Seringapatam the Christians were accompanied by three priests, who had secretly joined them despite threats of expulsion by Tipu.

Trouble arose when guards began molesting captive Christian women at their first camp at Bantwal, although able-bodied captives were able to resist the guards. At the next camp at Jamalabad fort, the rebel Christian leaders were thrown down from the fort. The town of "Nettrekere" or "Netterkedu" in Tulu, on the cross roads from Maripalla to Kalpane, derives its name from the large pool of blood which resulted from the execution of rebellious Mangalorean Catholics on their march to Mysore.

According to a captive from Barcoor, pregnant women often gave birth en route, and their babies had to be borne bundled about them. When they rested, the infants were suspended in cradles from the branches of trees. If anyone happened to die they were buried on the spot. Captives were not given any rations, and when the time came to move on, those who had not finished cooking had to leave behind their rice and the cooking pots. The Barcoor Manuscript along with other British Government records suggest that 20,000 captives (one-third of the total) died on the march to Seringapatam due to hunger, disease, and ill treatment by soldiers. The journey to Seringapatam took six weeks. By 1787, some 30,000 captives, half the original number, had perished.

== Fifteen-year captivity ==
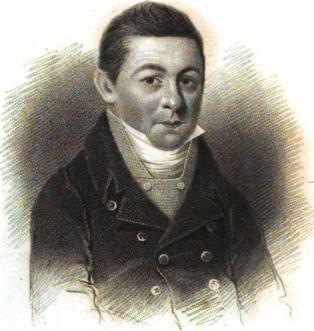
British officer James Scurry, who was detained as a prisoner of War for 10 years by Tipu Sultan along with the Mangalorean Catholics

On arrival at Seringapatam the Christian captives were forced to embrace Islam. All those who complied were freed. Those who refused were tied to the feet of the elephants to be dragged and trampled on Tipu's orders.

One English prisoner related that two risalas (regiments of soldiers) arrived daily in Seringapatam to select girls they could take as prizes to join their harems. Often when girls were seized, their young men would offer resistance and smash their dhoolies (palanquin). Officers would capture the attackers and administer five hundred strokes with whips and canes, from whose effects many men died. Historian Lewin Bentham Bowring reports that, "Tipu demanded the surrender of the daughters of some of these Christians in order to have them placed in his seraglio, and that, on the refusal of their parents, the latter had their noses, ears and upper lips cut off, and were paraded through the streets on asses, with their faces towards the tails of the animals."

Such treatment of the Christians for refusals by the girls is also confirmed in the accounts of British officer James Scurry, who was held captive along with the Mangalorean Catholics. In his book The Captivity, Sufferings, and Escape of James Scurry, who was Detained a Prisoner During Ten Years, in the Dominions of Hyder Ali and Tippoo Saib (1824), Scurry also reports that Tipu relented on his demand for captive girls, after one captive fell from her beast and expired on the spot through loss of blood. About 200 young women, the prettiest and fairest, were selected for Tipu's seraglio. The rest of the women were distributed as wives to Muslim officers and favourites living there. The future Christian progeny of these young girls and women were lost, and their descendants are fully Islamic as of today.

As the food in the camp was sub-standard, Balthazar of Belthangadi, a Mangalorean Catholic nobleman, offered to make a chutney for the captured Mangalorean Catholics. This came to be known as the legendary "Balthazar Chutney". The jemadars, subedars, and havildars meted out more an ignominious punishment to those who refused to accept Islam, slitting off their ears and noses. They were seated on asses, paraded through the city, and thrown into the dungeons of Seringapatam. Able-bodied young Christian men were drafted into the army after being circumcised and converted to Islam.

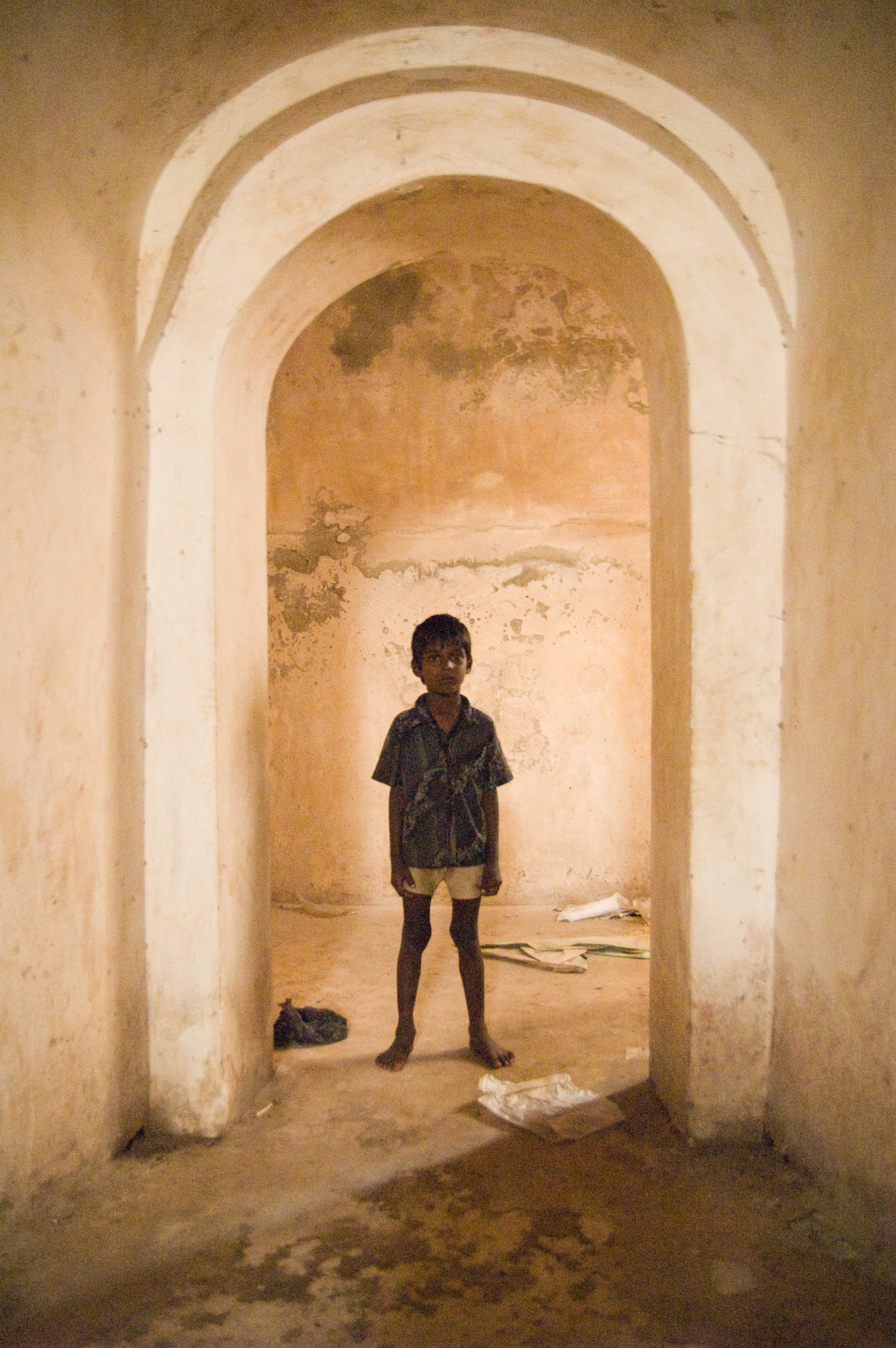
A dungeon at Seringapatam. Those Christians who refused to embrace Islam were imprisoned in such dungeons.

The Barcoor Manuscript records, "On four occasions the young able-bodied Christian men were thus drafted for the Army. Some of them were appointed jemadars, subedars, and havildars. The Sircar supplied them with ghee, butter, curds, firewood, etc. One hundred men were formed into one company, four companies into a risala, four risalas into a sufedar, and four sufedars were placed under a bakshi. Out of every company twenty-five men were taken and circumcised at the end of every month. When the wounds were healed, another twenty-five were taken and circumcised, and so on, until the whole company was initiated into Islamism."

British general Kirkpatrick arrives at a figure of 15,000 young men capable of bearing arms, formed into 30 risalas. They were drafted into the Ahmedy Corps in 1785 and went on to serve in Tipu's campaigns against the Marathas, the Nizam, and the British during 1786 and 1787. Casualties were heavy and only a few survived captivity.

Those who remained, such as the lame, the blind and the aged, employed themselves in cultivating the land and doing other manual work. Many were made to carry baskets filled with gobra (cowdung) for three days as a public warning to others. The stubborn Christians were given the most menial tasks, and made to work in the paddy fields. They were underfed, and immediately imprisoned for fighting. Completely isolated from any women, the idea was for the captive men to die of old age without creating any progeny.

Tipu appointed some Christian captives to posts in his household. He made Salu (Salvadore) Pinto Deputy Vizier and Anthony Gagialgar (clockmaker) Saldanha House Chamberlain. One of his most faithful servants, a Mangalorean Catholic named Manuel Mendes, saved Tipu's life in Travancore when he donned his master's robes and sat in his palanquin. Tipu escaped in the general panic whilst Mendes was captured and killed by the Nairs, who mistook him for Tipu.

In 1785, after declaring the Coorgis guilty of polyandry, Tipu seized nearly 70,000 Hindus of Coorg along with their king, Dodda Vira Rajendra, and held them captive at Seringapatam. They were also forcibly converted to Islam and received the same harsh treatment as the Mangalorean Catholics. From 1786 until 1789, even the Nairs of Malabar were captured and deported to Seringapatam.

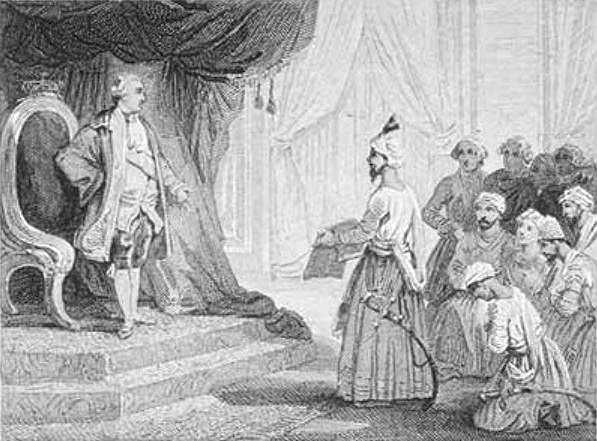
Tipu's embassy visited the court of the French King Louis XVI in 1788. During the visit, Pope Clement XIV's representative conveyed the appeal to the embassy to allow the priests in Seringapatam.

By 1787, half of the Christians had perished through disease and starvation. Tipu attempted to preach to the remaining Christians in Canara, and took them into custody. As the Christians settled down in Seringapatam, they slowly reorganised themselves with the elders forming a secret group named the "Council of Ten", to help keep their faith alive. According to Balthazar of Belthangadi, in the "Council of Ten", the Christians met from time to time to deliberate on issues concerning the community. In 1789, one of his officers informed him of the group and Tipu thereafter banned any political gatherings of Christians.

The Christians, believing that this tribulation came upon them for their neglect of the Law of God and their religious duties, began to fervently read the Krista Purana, an epic poem on the life of Jesus Christ written by the English Jesuit Thomas Stephens (1549–1619). On discovering this, some Muslims destroyed the books, but the Christians constructed subterranean refuges in which to perform their religious devotions, read the books, and strengthen their faith. According to Mr. Silva of Gangollim, a survivor of the captivity, if a person who had escaped from Seringapatam was found, the punishment ordered by Tipu was amputation of the ears, nose, feet and one hand.

Several thousand Christians in the dominion of Tipu Sultan had often in past years represented to him the discomfort attending the due exercise of their religion. He had hitherto paid no manner of regard to their supplications. Nevertheless, the present state of affairs in his extensive empire had inclined his heart to mercy and not to harshness. Wherefore he had dispatched these his trusty messengers who might convey the words of his mouth in all variety, begging the Governor and the Archbishop not to refuse every needful exertion towards succoring their brethren Christians according to the obligations of their religion. And he would as soon as might be convenient rebuild at his own expense the Churches that the fate decreed agents of destruction had levelled to the ground.

— Letter sent by Tipu to the Archbishop of Goa

Reports by Joachim Miranda and the Portuguese Government confirm that the Christians were forcibly circumcised and converted to Islam. These Christians then openly practised Islam. Some writers hold the view that the Christians did not voluntary submit to these conversions. Other Christian missionaries also appealed to the Roman Catholic Church to intervene on behalf of the captive Christians. A priest also wrote a letter to the Holy See to put pressure on Tipu to allow the priests.

When Tipu's embassy visited the court of the French King Louis XVI in 1788, Pope Clement XIV's representative conveyed the appeal to the embassy. In the Third Anglo-Mysore War (1789–1792), the British and their allies defeated Tipu. Desperate to break the alliance of powers surrounding him on all sides, Tipu sought to make peace with Portugal, the Marathas, and other powers. According to Severine Silva, he consequently gave up the persecution of Christians, opened negotiations with the Portuguese Government and with the Archbishop of Goa, with a promise that he would stop molesting the Christians, further asserting that he would rebuild all destroyed churches at his own cost. The Christians found their supervision relaxed and Tipu became more conciliatory in his attitude. The Christians now escaped from the camps of Seringapatam and gradually began to enter the neighbouring kingdoms of Coorg and Malabar.

At this time many Christians performed daring feats to rescue captives from Seringapatnam and take them to places of safety. A captive named Domingo Pinto (brother of Salvador Pinto, who rose to high rank in the services of Tipu), was particularly proficient in this. He rescued many people and took them secretly to Mangalore or Tellicherry. He proposed that those anxious to regain their liberty could be rescued on payment to him of a certain sum of money. He fixed the rescue price per captive at 8 hoons (Rs. 32) for a male, and 4 hoons (Rs. 16) for a female.

In 1792, the King of Coorg, Dodda Vira-Rajendra, managed to escape from captivity at Seringapatnam, and, with the aid of the British armies under Lord Cornwallis, was able to regain Coorg for himself through the treaty of 1792 between the English, their allies and Tipu. Anxious to repopulate a kingdom depopulated by Tipu, Dodda welcomed the fugitive Konkani Christians. As an inducement to remain permanently in his territory, he granted them several privileges, obtained a priest from Goa, and built a chapel for them. After the relaxation of policies from 1792 onwards, the Christians began to resettle in Canara. Many Mangalorean Catholic students, who had studied for the priesthood in Goa returned to Mangalore.

After considering the changed circumstances, the Archbishop of Goa, by a provision issued on 20 February 1795, appointed Minguel José Louis Mendes interim vicar of the four sub-districts of Mangalore, Barcoor, Onore and Moolki. Some other priests also came to Canara with the new vicar. Those from Goa retained their old prejudices and could not accept the rule of Tipu, openly advocating rebellion against him, writing offensive letters and making offensive speeches. As a result, in 1797, the brief respite enjoyed by the Christians ceased and their persecution recommenced.

== End of captivity and re-establishment ==
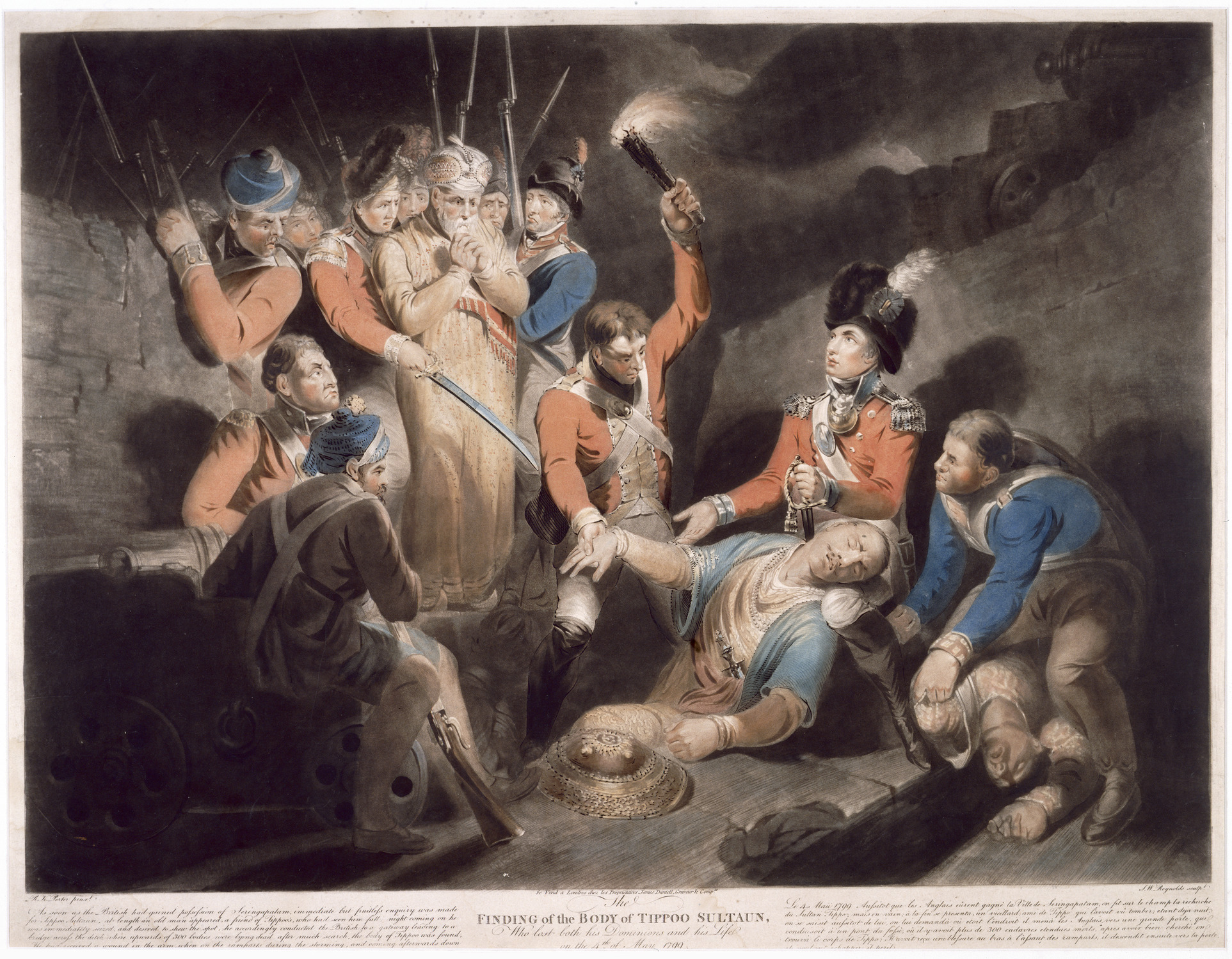
Finding the body of Tipu Sultan by Samuel William Reynolds.

In the Battle of Seringapatam on 4 May 1799, the British army under officers George Harris, David Baird, and Arthur Wellesley stormed the fortress, breached the town of Seringapatam, and killed Tipu. After Tipu's death in the Fourth Anglo-Mysore War, the Mangalorean Catholics were freed from captivity. Of the 60,000–80,000 Christians taken captive, only 15,000–20,000 made it out as Christians. British general Arthur Wellesley helped 10,000 of them return to Canara. Of the remaining Christians freed, about a thousand went to Malabar, and some hundreds settled in Coorg.

According to Francis Buchanan, 15,000 of them returned to Mangalore and its environs, whilst 10,000 of them migrated to Malabar. The Gazetteer of the Bombay Presidency (1883) mentions that 15,000 persons returned, of whom 12,000 were from South Canara and 3,000 from North Canara. According to the Mangalorean Catholic genealogist Michael Lobo, the present Mangalorean Catholic community is descended almost entirely from the small group of survivors who returned to South Canara. Soon after the death of Tipu, a detachment from the Bombay army under Lieutenant-Colonel Wiseman took possession of Mangalore on 4 June 1799, as well as the entire province of Canara, with the exception of the fortress of Jamalabad.

Thomas Munro was appointed the first collector of Canara in June 1799 and remained in the post until October 1800. He was accompanied by officers John Goldsborough Ravenshaw and Alexander Reade who were to take control and reorganise the administration. Munro issued three edicts regarding Christian estates that had been taken over by non-Christians during the captivity. In determining ownership of land, he sent two Mangalorean Hindus, Muthsuddy Vencappah and Saly Purvoe Dur Shetty along with other Christians to investigate and report back to him about these estates. Through the assistance of the Church, and with the support of Munro, the Christians were able to recover their lands and estates.

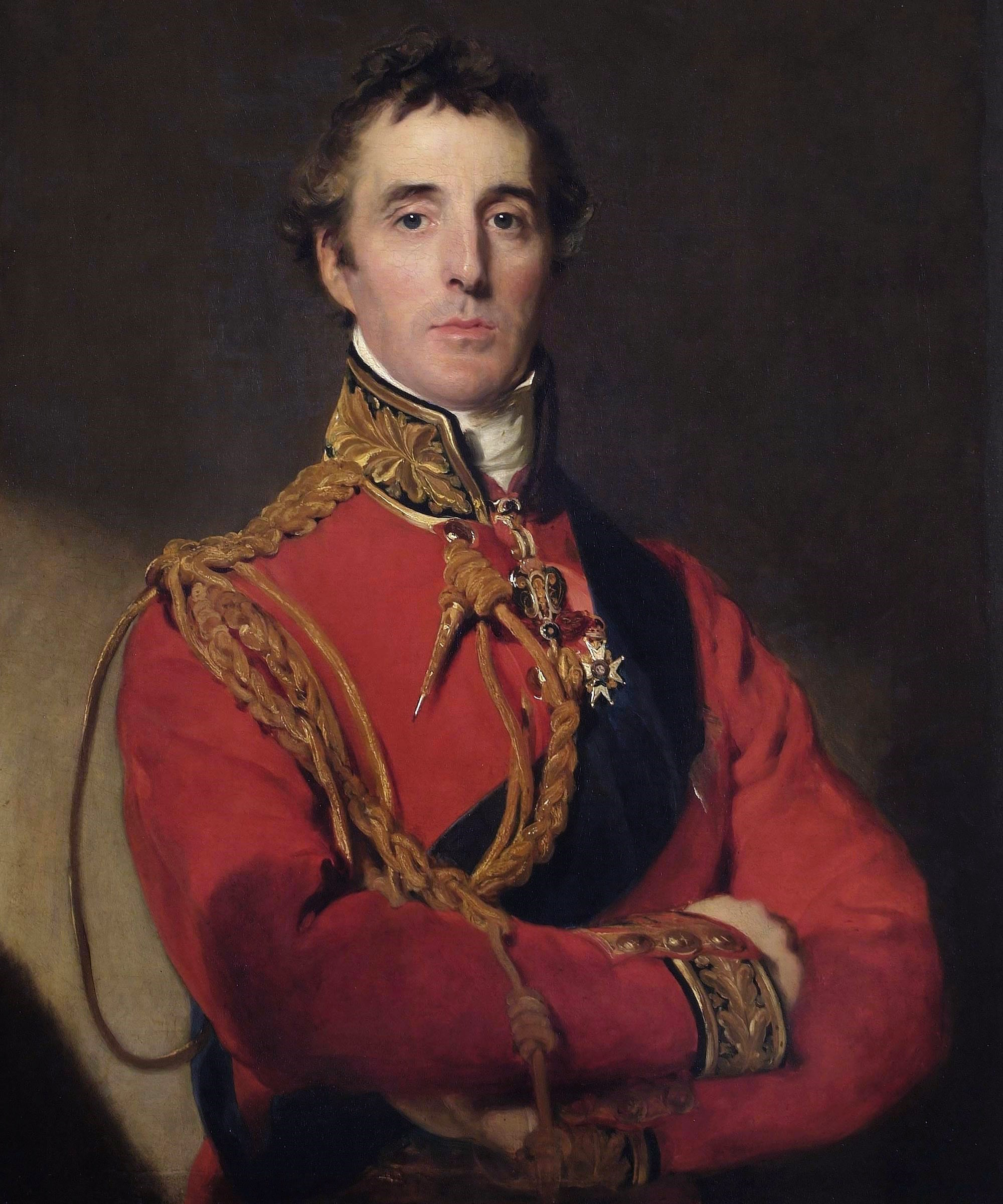
Arthur Wellesley helped 10,000 Mangalorean Catholics to return to South Canara and resettle on their lands.

In 1800, the British took a census of the region. Of the 396,672 people living in South Canara, 10,877 were Christians residing in 2,545 houses. According to the same census, in the entire province of Canara, out of the 592,000 people, the Christian population was recorded as 10,877 in South Canara, and 2,380 in North Canara. Padre José Miguel Luis de Mendes, a Goan Catholic priest, was appointed Vicar of Our Lady of Rosary at Mangalore on 7 December 1799. He took a lot of interest in the re-establishment of the community from 1799 to 1808. Later, John Goldsborough Ravenshaw was appointed collector of South Canara, whilst Alexander Reade became collector of North Canara. Ravenshaw took an active part in the re-establishment of their former possessions and recovery of their estates. He constructed a church for them, which was completed in 1806. Churches destroyed by Tipu were rebuilt by the Christians.

After relocation, the jurisdiction of the Archbishop of Goa recommenced. The Christian population almost doubled in 1818 when their total in North and South Canara was estimated to be 21,280 out of a total population of 670,355. According to various parish books dating to the time, Mangalorean Catholics numbered 19,068 in South Canara (12,877 in Mangalore and Bantval, 3,918 in Moolki, 2,273 in Cundapore and Barcoor), whilst Christians in North Canara numbered 2,749 (1,878 in Onore, 599 in Ancola, and 272 in Sunquerim). Before long the Mangalorean Catholics became a prosperous and influential community consisting mainly of planters, tile manufacturers, and agriculturists. They also competed with the local Brahmins for offices in the services of the British, under whose rule the community prospered.

== Criticism of Tipu ==
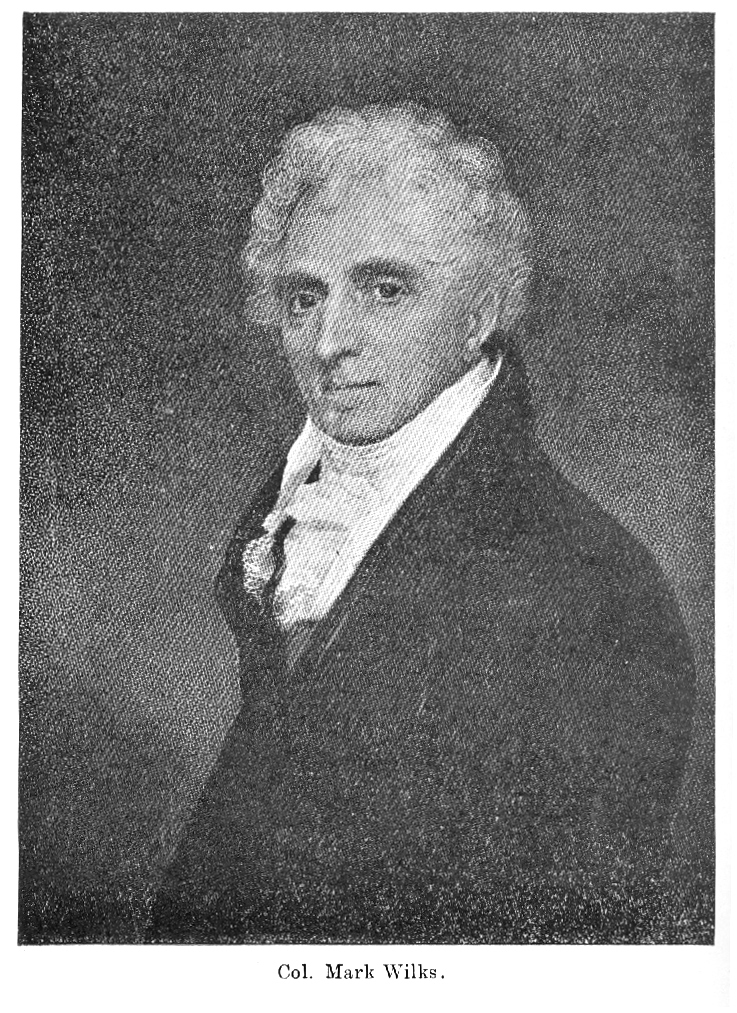
Mark Wilks has described Tipu as an Islamic fanatic.

Many Roman Catholic and British writers have severely criticised Tipu for his policies and treatment of Christians. British general Kirkpatrick referred to Tipu as, "the intolerant bigot and the furious fanatic." British Colonel Mark Wilks in his Historical Sketches of the South of India, cites an account in which Tipu mentions that, "the cause arose from the rage of Islam began to boil in his breast when informed of the circumstances of the spread of Christianity in Goa and Canara."

According to historian Thomas Paul, Tipu shifted his hatred for the British to the Mangalorean Catholics and other South Indian Christian communities. Sita Ram Goel mentions that Tipu's justification for the conversion was that during the Portuguese domination, many Muslims were forcibly converted to Christianity. Tipu proclaimed his actions as a punishment for the conversion of Muslims to Christianity.

According to historian Alan Machado Prabhu, Tipu's reasons for the captivity were primarily religious. He found the social customs of the Christians distasteful, such as their fondness for pork and the social acceptance of alcohol. Tipu therefore saw them as a community deserving of his religious zeal as a Padishah. As evidence of this, Prabhu states that Tipu does not mention a large scale Christian conspiracy in his writings in the Sultan-ul-Tawarikh, where he justifies his action instead as arising from the "rage of Islam that began to boil in his breast."

Prabhu further asserts that Tipu's hatred of Christians was compounded by fears that as they shared the same faith as their European co-religionists, the Christians were viewed as a potential fifth column in the event of a British offensive into his territories. To this, he adds that Tipu also had future territorial ambitions in Goa and wanted to rid himself of any potential dissent from the Christians within his domain. Therefore, according to Prabhu, through coerced confessions of prominent Mangalorean Catholics, Tipu fabricated evidence of a large-scale Christian conspiracy against him, even though he knew it wasn't true.

Contemporary scholars like Surendranath Sen, Mohibbul Hasan, N. K. Sinha, and B. Sheik Ali, who have analysed Tipu's religious policies on Christians, conclude that he was not a religious bigot. They argue that forcible conversions to Islam were done purely for political, not religious reasons. Forced conversions were carried out as a punishment for Christians who supported the British against their own native suzerain. The conversions came after many warnings by Tippu.

More than a century after the Captivity ended, Jerome Saldanha, a Mangalorean Catholic historian and civil servant during the British Raj at the Bombay Presidency, wrote an article in Mangalore Magazine, published by St. Aloysius College, which chronicled contemporary developments and views from the closing decades of the 19th century:

People of all classes belonging to Canara, especially the Christians, had suffered so dreadfully from Tipu's regime of terror that they welcomed the British with a sense of relief and joy, and a hope of future peace and prosperity, that perhaps nowhere else was felt in India on the advent of the British. Nor were our ancestors disappointed, for they found that the main object of British rule in India was to secure the happiness of the people over whom it was held.

== Criticism of the Christians ==
Thirty years after the event the apparent lack of resistance from the Christian captives drew criticism from the French priest Abbe Dubois. In one of his letters dated 1815, Dubois commented, "not a single individual among so many thousands had courage enough to confess his faith under this trying circumstance, and become a martyr to his religion." Various writers have concluded that the acceptance and practise of Islam by the Christians amounted to partial apostasy.

== Remembrance of captivity ==
During the mid-19th century, Victor Fernandes, Bishop of Mangalore (1931–1955), erected a large cross on the former outskirts of Mangalore in Nanthoor near the Padav hills in honour of the memory of those Mangalorean Catholics who died on the march to Seringapatam during the Captivity. The bicentenary of the release from captivity was widely celebrated on 4 May 1999 by the Mangalorean Catholic community. Five Catholics walked from Seringapatam to Mangalore to retrace the 278-kilometre (173 mi) route that Tipu Sultan forced the Christians to follow in 1784. The commemorative march ended on 11 May at the Rosario Cathedral, Mangalore.

== Accounts of the captivity ==
=== Arabic and Farsi Inscriptions Record ===
The treatment of the prisoners of Tippu Sultan's Coorg and Mangalore campaigns is recorded in the Arabic and Farsi inscriptions on the south wall of the mosque at Seringapatam, dated 1787 AD.

=== James Scurry ===
Now followed the fate of the poor Malabar Christians,^{[b]} of which I shall consider myself the innocent cause, in reading what was written by General Mathews, as stated in the preceding note. Their country was invested by Tippu's army, and they were driven men, women and children to the number of 30,000 to Sirangapatam where all who were fit to carry arms were circumcised and forwarded into four battalions. The sufferings of these poor creatures were most excruciating: one circumstance which came under my immediate notice, I will attempt to describe: when recovered they were armed and drilled, and ordered to Mysore, nine miles from the capital, but for what purpose we could not learn. Their daughters were many of them beautiful girls; and Tippu was determined to have them for his seraglio; but this they refused; and Mysore was invested by his orders, and the four battalions were disarmed and brought prisoners to Sirangapatam. This being done, the officers tied their hands behind them. The Chambars or Sandalmakers were then sent for and their noses ears and upper lips were cut off. They were then mounted on asses, their faces towards the tail and led through Patan, with a wretch before them proclaiming their crime. One fell from his beast and expired on the spot through loss of blood. Such a mangled and bloody scene excited the compassion of numbers and our hearts were ready to burst at the inhuman sight. It was reported that Tippu relented in this case, and I rather think it true, as he never gave any further orders respecting their women. The twenty-six that survived were sent to his different arsenals where after the lapse of a few years I saw several of them lingering out a most miserable existence.

- No doubt many of them survived the downfall of Tippu and I should have been proud to hear that the Company had done something for those brave unfortunate men, and particularly so as all their miseries originated from an English general. The prison from whence the Malabar Christians were brought to have their noses and ears cut off for refusing their daughters when Tippu demanded them for his seraglio was a horrid dismal hole which we named the Bull, as there was an image, considerably larger than life, of that animal on that building, which was originally designed for a Hindoo place of worship, but by Tippu converted into a dungeon. This prison we frequently passed and expected sooner or later to occupy some part of it. Very few who were so unfortunate to be confined here, escaped with less punishment than the loss of their nose and ears. The Chambars by whom the operation was performed are held in abhorrence by the Mahomedans, and, on that account they were consigned to this office; and such was their brutality that they frequently cut, (or sawed rather), the upper lip off with the nose leaving the poor unfortunate wretch a pitiable object, to spin out a most miserable existence, being always sent to Tippu's arsenals to hard labour on a scanty allowance.

— The Captivity, Sufferings And Escape of James Scurry Who Was Detained a Prisoner During Ten Years in the Dominions of Hyder Ali and Tippu Saheb (1824), pp. 102–106

=== Mr. Silva of Gangollim, a survivor of the captivity ===
22 November 1904.

My dear Sister,

Though you are so old, I have not yet told you what our beloved grandfather did and what he suffered. I am now narrating to you what he told me in almost the same words. They were seven brothers and one sister. The sister died at an early age. She was buried by putting on the clothes which are seen on pictures of angels. All the brothers were much grieved at the sad loss.... After this, a rakshasa^{[c]} by name Tipu Sultan seized all the Christians from Sadashivgad to Coorg and marched them to Pattana. My grandfather and all his brothers also were taken by the sepoys. Only because grandfather's father and mother were too old and weak, they were left behind. All these seven were imprisoned. For many days they were confined to different rooms separated from one another. Sometimes they were taken out. They suffered much because they were not given food. If they were given one handful of ragi flour, they were not given salt or anything else. Even this ragi flour was given occasionally. There was nothing to dress and nothing to cover in the night. With such afflictions, six brothers died. My grandfather, while he was allowed to go out for a while, used to eat leaves or pieces of leather if available, because he could not sustain the pangs of hunger. But he used to recite the Rosary daily, with the rosary in hand. One day when the grandfather was brought out along with or by (illegible) he disappeared without the knowledge of anybody into a bamboo bush. The sepoys had not seen him. There were thousands of people; and there were the solemnities of the Moharrum festival. Taking this opportunity, grandfather concealed himself. Then the sepoys took all the people inside and closed the gates of the town. At that time my grandfather was eight years old. If a person who had escaped was found, the punishment under the orders of Tippu was the cutting off of the ears, nose, the feet and one hand. The meting out of this punishment was seen by him; and he was much afraid that if he was caught he would be punished similarly. He began reciting the Rosary and praying that he should not be a victim to such punishment, this boy of eight years got out of the bush and began to run. To come home was a question of many days. He looked to and from on the road and very carefully too. The sight of any man even at a great distance was enough to drive him into the dense jungle to take shelter in some bush. He suffered much for want of rice. He lived on leaves and whatever he found in the jungle. While he was in this weak and lingering condition, one day he met a sepoy, who caught him and took him with him. There was no other alternative but to follow the sepoy. While he was in this plight and waling on the road of a place known as Asthari, he was given a severe blow on the head by the sepoy. Immediately, grandfather fell down senseless. The sepoy left him there thinking that he was dead, and walked away. After a long time, he recovered his senses. Yet his head was reeling and was very weak. Then the fright that if caught again, he would be taken back, forced him to remain in a jungle. Days and nights he passed in jungles. One day, he met two cartmen of his acquaintance going to the house of their relations. They recognised grandfather and treated him affectionately and took him to their relations and gave him food. The food consisted of bakri^{[d]}, curry of eggs and rice. Praising the Lord, he took the food which he craved for a long time. Later, by the grace of God, this boy returned to the house of his parents. 'Out of the seven brothers, this was the only one who returned alive,' so saying, his aged parents clasped him. After this he was educated and later he became an important man; he rendered assistance to several priests who loved him. He remained amidst them assisting them in all their needs. He was engaged to a girl in Goa. The girl belonged to a good family and was given a large dowry. Her name was Anna Maria Rodricks. The marriage was duly celebrated. There are many priests in that family.

— Account of a Surviving Captive, A Mr. Silva of Gangollim (Letter of a Mr. L.R. Silva to his sister, copy of which was given by an advocate, M.M. Shanbhag, to the author, Severine Silva, and reproduced as Appendix No. 74: History of Christianity in Canara (1961)

== In popular culture ==
- Many of Konkani littérateur V. J. P. Saldanha's Konkani historical novels such as Belthangaddicho Balthazar (Balthazar of Belthangadi), Devache Krupen (By the Grace of God), Sardarachi Sinol (The sign of the Knights) and Infernachi Daram (The gates of Hell) deal with the captivity of Mangalorean Catholics at Seringapatam. In these novels, the Mangalorean Catholic community of the eighteenth century are portrayed as brave, hardworking and selfless, while Tipu is portrayed as cunning, haughty, hard-hearted, revengeful, yet full of self-control.

== See also ==
- Armenian Genocide
- Captivity of Coorgis at Seringapatam
- Captivity of Nairs at Seringapatam

== Footnotes ==
a The Memorial of 15 May 1860, was addressed by the Catholics of Mangalore to Mons. Bonnand of Pondicherry, who had then been appointed as the Apostolic Visitator by the Holy See.
b "Malabar Christians" is a possible misinterpretation by James Scurry. The term actually refers to the Christians of Canara.
c Rakshasa is the Kannada word for demon or monster.
d Bakri is a flatbread made of rice and grated coconut.

== Bibliography ==
- Anathil, George M. (1966). The theological formation of the clergy in India. Pontifical Athenaeum..
- Bhat, N. Shyam (1998), South Kanara, 1799–1860: a study in colonial administration and regional response, Mittal Publications, ISBN 978-81-7099-586-9, archived from the original on 22 January 2021.
- Bowring, Lewin B. (1893), Haidar Ali and Tipu Sultan and the Struggle with the Musalman Powers of the South, IDARAH-I ADABIYAT-I DELLI, ISBN 978-81-206-1299-0, archived from the original on 17 August 2011.
- Bowring, Lewin B. (1988), A Journey from Madras Through the Countries of Mysore, Canara, and Malabar: For the Express Purpose of Investigating the State of Agriculture, Arts and Commerce, the Religion, Manners, and Customs, the History Natural and Civil, and Antiquities, Asian Educational Services, ISBN 978-81-206-0386-8, archived from the original on 30 October 2021.
- Buchanan, Francis (1988). A Journey from Madras Through the Countries of Mysore, Canara, and Malabar, for the Express Purpose of Investigating the State of Agriculture, Arts and Commerce, the Religion, Manners, and Customs: The History, Natural and Civil and Antiquities. Asian Educational Services. ISBN 978-81-206-0386-8.
- Caktitacan, Jalaja (1990), Tippu Sultan, a fanatic?, Nithyananda Jothi Nilayam.
- Cariappa, M. P.; Cariappa, Ponnamma (1981), The Coorgs and their Origins, Aakar Books, OCLC 641505186.
- D'Souza, A. L. P. (1983), History of the Catholic Community of South Kanara, Desco Publishers.
- D'Souza, Edwin J. F. (2004), V.J.P. Saldanha (Makers of Indian literature), Sahitya Akademi, ISBN 978-81-260-2028-7, archived from the original on 30 October 2021.
- Ferroli, Domenico (1955), The Jesuits in Mysore, Cannanore: Xavier Press.
- Falcao, Nelson M. (2003), Kristapurana, a Christian-Hindu encounter: a study of inculturation in the Kristapurana of Thomas Stephens, S.J. (1549–1619), Gujarat Sahitya Prakash, ISBN 978-81-87886-72-3.
- Farias, Kranti K. (1999), The Christian Impact on South Kanara, Church History Association of India.
- Fernandes, Praxy (1969), Storm over Seringapatam: the incredible story of Hyder Ali & Tippu Sultan, Thackers.
- Fernandes, Praxy (1991), The Tigers of Mysore: a biography of Hyder Ali & Tipu Sultan, Viking.
- Gazetteer of the Bombay Presidency, vol. v. 15, part 1, Government Central Press, 1883
- George, K. M. (2010), Christianity in India Through The Centuries, Authentic Media, ISBN 978-81-7362-786-6.
- Goel, Sita Ram (1993), Tipu Sultan: villain or hero? : an anthology, Voice of India, ISBN 978-81-85990-08-8, archived from the original on 26 September 2009.
- Heras Institute of Indian History and Culture (1997), Indica, vol. 34, St. Xavier's College (Bombay)
- "History" (PDF, 3.7 MB), South Kanara District Gazetteer, Karnataka State Gazetteer, vol. 12, Gazetteer Department (Government of Karnataka), 1973, pp. 33–85, archived (PDF) from the original on 25 February 2009
- "People" (PDF, 2.57 MB), South Kanara District Gazetteer, Karnataka State Gazetteer, vol. 12, Gazetteer Department (Government of Karnataka), 1973, pp. 86–125, archived (PDF) from the original on 25 March 2009
- Hunter, William Wilson; Cotton, James Sutherland; Burn, Richard; Meyer, William Stevenson; Great Britain India Office (1909), "The Imperial Gazetteer of India", Nature, 81 (2070), Clarendon Press: 1, Bibcode:1909Natur..81....1T, doi:10.1038/081001a0, archived from the original on 16 December 2008
- Catalani, Jordanus; Yule, Henry (2001), Mirabilia Descripta: The Wonders of the East, Adamant Media Corporation, ISBN 978-1-4021-9555-6, archived from the original on 30 October 2021.
- Hasan, Mohibul (1951), History of Tipu Sultan (1 ed.), Calcutta: Bibliophile..
  - Hasan, Mohibul (1971), History of Tipu Sultan (2 ed.), Calcutta: World Press.
- Lobo, Michael (1999), Mangaloreans World-wide: An International Directory of the Mangalorean Catholic Community, Camelot Publishers, ISBN 81-87609-00-1.
- Madtha, William (1984), The Christian Konkani of South Kanara: a linguistic analysis, Prasaranga, Karnatak University.
- Mujeeb, Mohammad (1985), The Indian Muslims, Munshiram Manoharlal.
- Mukherjee, Ramkrishna (1974), The rise and fall of the East India Company (3, illustrated ed.), Monthly Review Press, ISBN 978-0-85345-315-4.
- Pai; Supriya (1981), Konknni Huminnyom (Konkani Riddles): an Anthropological Analysis of the Konkany Riddles of Mangalore Catholics, Satabdi Prakasan.
- Prabhu, Alan Machado (1999), Sarasvati's Children: A History of the Mangalorean Christians, I.J.A. Publications, ISBN 978-81-86778-25-8.
- Saeed, Ahmad (1969), Tipu Sultan, Ferozsons.
- Sardesai, Manohar Rai (2000), A History of Konkani Literature: From 1500 to 1992, Sahitya Akademi, ISBN 978-81-7201-664-7, archived from the original on 30 October 2021.
- Saldanha, S.N. (1933), The Captivity of Canara Christians under Tippu in 1784.
- Saldanha, Jerome A. (1938), Origin and growth of Konkani or Goan communities and language.
- Scurry, James; Whiteway, William (1824), The Captivity, Sufferings, and Escape of James Scurry, who was Detained a Prisoner During Ten Years, in the Dominions of Hyder Ali and Tippoo Saib (3, illustrated ed.), Monthly Review Press, ISBN 978-0-85345-315-4, archived from the original on 3 January 2014.
- Silva, Severine (1957), History of Christianity in Canara, vol. I, Kumta, Uttara Kannada: Star of Kanara Press.
- Silva, Severine (1961), History of Christianity in Canara: Issue 3 of Indian culture and folklore, Star of Kanara Press
- Silva, Severine; Fuchs, Stephan (1965), "The Marriage Customs of the Christians in South Canara, India" (PDF), Asian Ethnology, 2, 24, Nanzan Institute for Religion and Culture, Nanzan University (Japan): 1–52, archived from the original (PDF) on 19 July 2011
- Sinha, N. K. (1949), Hydar Ali, Calcutta.
- Spens, John; Campbell, John (1836), Memoir of the life and character of the late lieut.-colonel John Campbell, by a retired officer [J. Spens], Oxford University, ISBN 978-0-85345-315-4, archived from the original on 30 October 2021.
- Steinmetz, Andrew (1848), History of the Jesuits: from the foundation of their society to its suppression by Pope Clement XIV.; their missions throughout the world; their educational system and literature; with their revival and present state, R. Bentley, archived from the original on 30 October 2021.
- The Calcutta review -December, vol. 21, University of Calcutta, July 1853, archived from the original on 30 October 2021
- The Gentleman's Magazine, vol. CIII, F. Jefferies, 1833, archived from the original on 30 October 2021
- The Oriental Herald, vol. 3, September 1824, archived from the original on 30 October 2021
- The Oriental Herald, vol. 2, May 1824, archived from the original on 30 October 2021
- Royal Geographical Society (Great Britain) (1856), A Gazetteer of the World: Or, Dictionary of Geographical Knowledge, Compiled from the Most Recent Authorities, and Forming a Complete Body of Modern Geography Physical, Political, Statistical, Historical, and Ethnographical, A. Fullarton, archived from the original on 30 October 2021
- Thomas, Paul (1954), Christians and Christianity in India and Pakistan: a general survey of the progress of Christianity in India from apostolic times to the present day, Allen & Unwin.
- Tour, Maistre de la (1855), The history of Hyder Shah: alias Hyder Ali Khan Bahadur, and of his son, Tippoo Sultaun (revised ed.), London: W. Thacker & co., archived from the original on 30 October 2021.
