= Sultan Battery (Mangalore) =

Sultan Bateri Watch Tower
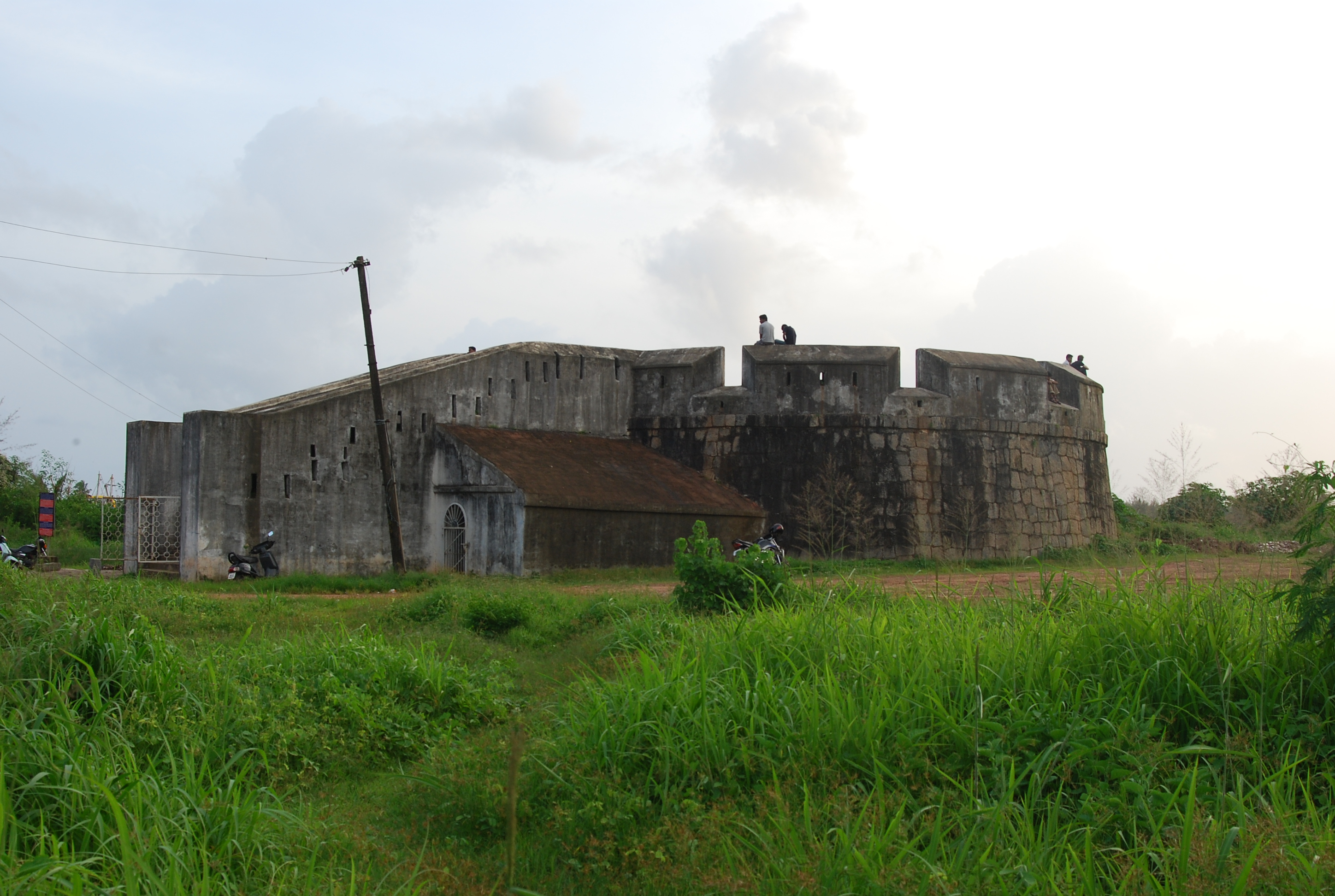
- Sultan Bateri watch tower
- Interactive map of Sultan Bateri Watch Tower
- Location: Boloor, Mangalore

History
- Built: Tipu Sultan

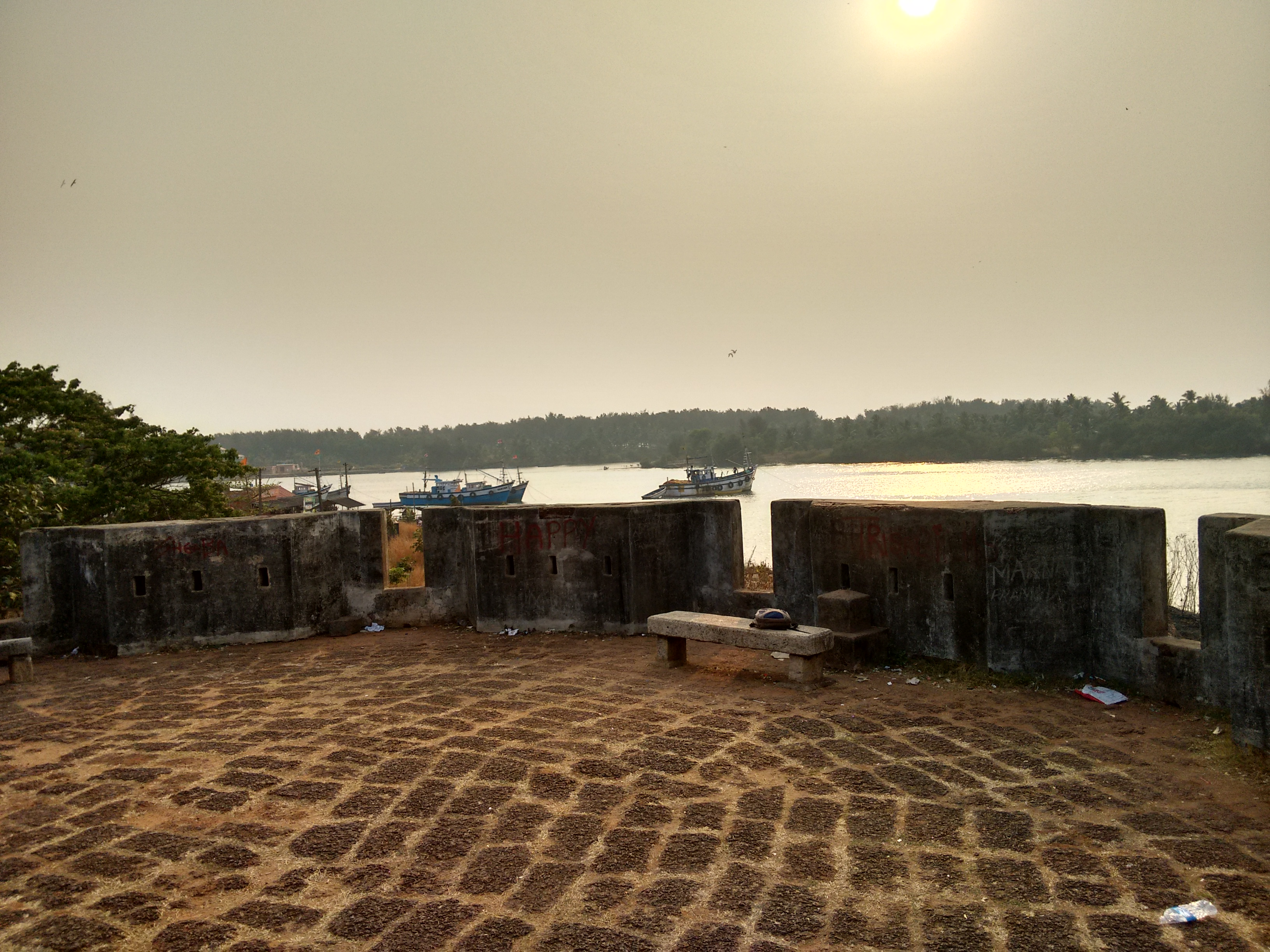
Top view

The Sultan Bateri watch tower, constructed in 1784 by Tipu Sultan is in Boloor, 4 km from the centre of Mangalore city, the chief port city in the state of Karnataka, India.

== History ==
Boloor is known for the watch tower constructed in the era of the ruler Tipu Sultan such that now the area surrounding the decaying structure is its namesake. The watch tower was constructed 15 years before his death in 1784 A.D. The place was previously known as Sultan's Battery (see artillery battery).

Sultan Battery was built of black stones and constructed to obstruct war ships from entering the river, which was the major route for English invasion but was then retrieved from the English by Tipu Sultan. It was also used as a fort with mounting places for cannons to prevent British forces from entering Mangalore by sea.

There is an underground storage area under the tower that was used to store gunpowder. As per historians, this underground has a secret route that leads to Mysore. Unfortunately, it is now closed and locked by Indian Tourism Authorities.

It was a major dockyard and arsenal of the ruler. It was a naval station and was of great importance to the sultan as he used it to intercept enemy warships and prevent them from docking.

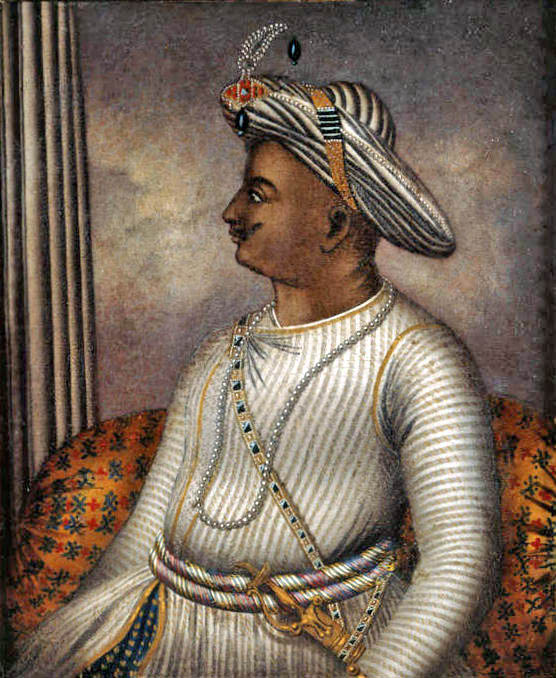
Tipu Sultan

If one climbs to the top of the watch tower by stairs, there is a panoramic view of the Arabian Sea, showing a blend of natural and man-made beauty. It is now nearly deserted with a few shacks and a boating club nearby, but it is gaining popularity among tourists.

=== Historical Context: Association with Religious Protection ===
Sultan Battery, constructed in 1784 by Tipu Sultan, is historically significant not only as a defensive military outpost but also due to its association with religious persecution during his rule.

==== Freedom and Support for Mangalorean Catholics ====
In 1784, following Tipu Sultan's conquest of Mangalore, sections of the Mangalorean Catholics community experienced significant political and social changes during the transition of power. The period surrounding the Captivity of Mangalorean Catholics at Seringapatam remains a subject of historical debate, with varying interpretations regarding the causes, scale, and outcomes of the events.

Subsequent records and accounts indicate that Christian institutions in the region continued to function, and several churches in Mangalore were maintained or restored over time. Notable examples include Milagres Church (Mangalore), Rosario Cathedral, and St. Joseph’s Church.

Local traditions and regional accounts also mention that materials, including stones from the Sultan Battery, were used in the reconstruction of certain churches, symbolizing shared spaces and interactions between communities.

Historians note that the period reflects a complex interaction between political authority and religious communities, where instances of conflict coexisted with phases of accommodation and restoration. These developments are often cited in discussions on interfaith relations in the region, highlighting moments of cooperation and coexistence between Christians, Muslims, and Hindus.

Overall, the historical record suggests that relations between communities during this period were multifaceted, and later developments in the region contributed to a legacy of shared cultural and religious spaces.

==== Helping of Hindus and Temple Patronage ====
Similarly, Hindu communities in Canara and the Malabar region continued their religious practices and constructed temples, indicating the continuity of their cultural and spiritual traditions. Accounts such as the Captivity of Nairs at Seringapatam remain debated among historians, with differing interpretations regarding the nature and scale of these events.

Several Hindu temples, including the Kadri Manjunatha Temple and Sri Venkataramana Temple, are recorded to have received donations during Tipu Sultan's military campaigns.

The Sringeri Sharada Peetham, a major Hindu monastic institution, was attacked and desecrated during this period. Historical records indicate that Tipu Sultan later corresponded with its authorities and provided assistance for its restoration.

Various historians and records mention that Tipu Sultan supported and donated to several Hindu temples during his reign, despite being a Muslim ruler.

Some well-documented examples include:

- Sri Ranganathaswamy Temple, Srirangapatna – Received grants and financial support for its upkeep.
- Melkote Cheluvanarayana Swamy Temple – Recorded to have received ornaments and land donations.
- Nanjundeshwara Temple, Nanjangud – Tipu Sultan is described in some accounts as referring to the deity as “Hakim Nanjunda” and making offerings.

While Tipu Sultan remains a controversial figure due to his military campaigns, particularly in regions such as Kerala and Coorg, where social disruptions occurred, there is also documented evidence of his patronage toward Hindu temples and institutions. This reflects the complexity of historical narratives and cautions against simplistic interpretations.

Additionally, the desecration of the Sringeri institution prompted responses from regional powers, including the Peshwa of the Maratha Empire, who is also recorded to have supported its restoration.

== Geography ==
The coastal area of Boloor and the southern adjoining area of Bokkapatna have been described as Mangalorean villages rather than suburbs, due to the traditional lifestyle of the population. Most residents of the area still fish and trade as primary activities. The streets of Bokkapatna at sunset are said to give the feeling of a village. Boloor overlooks the Gurupura River, which snakes further south and joins the Arabian Sea by interrupting the 8 km long Bengre headland, the primary breakwater of the city of Mangalore.

Boloor, primarily Sultan Battery, is linked to the rest of the city by bus no. 16 that makes trips to and from at intervals of 15–20 minutes.

Now, this monument is protected by the central government of India, and its responsibility is under the Archaeological Survey of India Bangalore Circle.
