= V. J. P. Saldanha =

Indian littérateur and dramatist (1925–2000)

- Born: Vincent John Peter Saldanha; 9 June 1925; Mangalore, Kingdom of Mysore, British India
- Died: 22 February 2000 (aged 74); Mangalore, Dakshina Kannada, India
- Education: St. Aloysius College
- Occupations: littérateur, dramatist, novelist, short-story writer, and poet
- Spouse: Lilly Saldanha (m. 1969)
- Children: 2
- Writing career
- Years active: 1950–1994
- Genres: Historical fiction, detective fiction

Vincent John Peter Saldanha (9 June 1925 – 22 February 2000), better known as V. J. P. Saldanha, was an Indian Konkani language littérateur, dramatist, novelist, short-story writer and poet. He made significant contributions to Konkani literature as a poet, dramatist, novelist, and a litterateur.

Saldanha maintained a strong Catholic identity in his writings, and his main themes were the sufferings of 60,000 Mangalorean Catholics during their 15-year captivity at Seringapatam imposed by the Muslim ruler Tipu Sultan from 1784 to 1799, and the oppression of Goan Catholics during the Goa Inquisition. He was popularly referred to by his pen-name Khadap (The Rock).

== Early life and education ==
Vincent John Peter Saldanha was born on 9 June 1925, the eight child to Martin Ligoury Saldanha and Theresa Saldanha in the Omzoor locality of Mangalore. They were Mangalorean Catholics, and belonged to the Saldanha-Prabhu clan of Omzoor. Saldanha attended St. Joseph's Higher Elementary School in Mangalore. During this period, he wrote regularly to Abhyudaya (Development), the school's handwritten magazine in Kannada. He was also very popular in writing and staging skits and short plays in school. He later joined St. Aloysius College in Mangalore to pursue his intermediate studies.

Soon after his intermediate studies, he took up a job as a physical instructor and a teacher of English at the Padua High School in Mangalore. Saldanha was also interested in sports and physical development. He used to read foreign books on muscle building, and also used to train youth in weightlifting. Later, he migrated to Bombay. With his good command of English and handwriting skills, he was offered a job by the Hindustan Insurance Cooperative Society. Saldanha resigned from the job in 1950, the same year in which he began his literary career.

== Literary career ==
In Mangalore, Saldanha had started and edited a Kannada called the Kannadavani. Saldanha published his first six-page Konkani weekly Poinnari (Traveller) on 10 September 1950 in Bombay. Poinnari was the third Konkani weekly published by Mangalorean Catholics; the first being Konknni Dirvem (Konkani Treasure), published in 1912 by Louis Mascarenhas, and the second was Raknno (Guardian), a weekly published by the Roman Catholic Diocese of Mangalore. Saldanha remained an editor of Poinnari till 1958. Upon his return to Mangalore that same year, he started a Kannada daily called Navabharatha (New India) in which he worked as the sub-editor. The daily later closed down due to lack of funds.

Saldanha had written 14 books on the sufferings endured by the Mangalorean Catholics during their captivity at Seringapatam, the oppression of Goan Catholics during the Goa Inquisition, and the rule of Tipu Sultan. He also authored a few detective novels such as Torichi Dal (Pigeon Pea), Tambddi Pitul (Red Copper) and Ruzvaath (The Evidence). Among his best known historical novels are Belthangaddicho Balthazar (Balthazar of Belthangadi), Devache Krupen (By the Grace of God), Sardarachi Sinol (The sign of the Knights) and Infernachi Daram (The gates of Hell). All of these above novels deal with the arrest of 60,000 Mangalorean Catholics and their deportation to Seringapatam by Tipu Sultan in 1784. In these novels, Tipu is portrayed as cunning, haughty, hard-hearted, revengeful, yet full of self-control. On the other hand, he portrays the Mangalorean Catholic community of the eighteenth century as brave, hardworking and selfless. The Mangalorean Catholic characters of his novels such as Balthazar of Belthangadi, Sardar Simaon Prabhu of Omzoor, Sardar Anthon Shet of Falnir, Dumga Peenth and Agnes Kuvorn display tremendous courage, nobility and selfless service.

His novel Saiba Bhogos (Forgive O God!) deals with the Goa Inquisition and Portuguese oppression of the Goan Hindus and Catholics in the eighteenth century. Saldanha received wide praise and critical acclaim for his novels. One of his novels, Sardarachi Sinol, was even turned into a very successful play. Saldanha was also a poet; his best known poem being Konkanche Shethkaar (The Farmers of Konkan). In recognition for his prolific contributions to Konkani literature, Saldanha was the recipient of several awards, most notably by the All-India Writers' Conference in 1975.

== Personal life ==
Saldanha was a devout Roman Catholic and a devotee of the Virgin Mary. At the age of 44, he married Lilly D'Souza, a school teacher from Kasargod on 29 December 1969. They had two sons: Elvio Francis and Ransom Jude. His elder son Elvio died prematurely on 25 February 1981, aged 11. His wife died on 21 December 2009.

== Last years ==
In 1978 at the age of 53, Saldanha obtained his master's degree in Sociology. He also developed an avid interest in Alternative medicine (more specifically point pressure) methods and Dr. Edward Bach's herbal remedies. He co-authored a book on Naturopathy with Dr. I.G. Hukkeri. Later, he did a course in Naturopathy and obtained the ND, DHM, MD (AM) and RMP (AM) degrees.

The last decade of Saldanha's life was devoted to the compilation of an English–Konkani dictionary. This work entitled 20th Century English–Konkani Concise (Kannada and Devanagari scripts) was never completed during his lifetime, and as a result, went unpublished. The dictionary contained the meanings of more than 160,000 Konkani words. On 16 January 1994, Saldanha was appointed President of the Karnataka Konkani Sahitya Akademi by the Karnataka Government. Shortly after this, he suffered a debilitating stroke, as a result of which he was confined to his home. He died of heart failure on 22 February 2000.
