= Padav Hills =

Padav hills are a range of hills in the Mangalore taluk, Karnataka, India. During the mid-nineteenth century, Bishop Victor Fernandes, a Mangalorean Catholic priest, erected a large cross at former outskirts of Mangalore in Nanthoor near Padav hills to honour the memory of Mangalorean Catholic martyrs who died on the march and during their fifteen-year captivity at Seringapatam.
