= James Scurry =

British soldier (1766–1822)

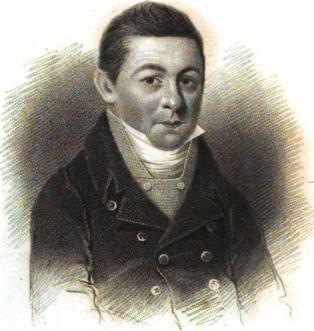
James Scurry

James Scurry (1766–1822) was a British soldier and memoirist. He was held captive by Hyder Ali and Tipu Sultan for 10 years (1780–1790) at Seringapatam. He had been kept as a prisoner, first at Bangalore and then moved to the Seringapatnam fort. After his escape from Tipu's army, in Chitterdroog, he reached an English camp. He prepared a narrative of his captivity in 1794, but it was not published until 1824, after his death.

He is known for his memoir The captivity, sufferings, and escape of James Scurry, who was detained a prisoner during ten years, in the dominions of Hyder Ali and Tippoo Saib (1824), which relates the sufferings and treatment of the captured English soldiers, Mangalorean Catholics, and other prisoners of war by Hyder Ali and Tipu Sultan, the rulers of the Kingdom of Mysore in India.

== Early life and family ==
James Scurry was born in Devonshire, England. His father served in the British Army and was present at the 1775 Battle of Bunker Hill early in the American Revolutionary War, where he was promoted to the post of paymaster-sergeant for his bravery. Later, he became the inmate of a Greenwich mental asylum where he died, leaving his widow with James and his sister. James Scurry went to sea at a very early age. He went on his first voyage when he was nearly seven years old. He spent a considerable time on the American coast and the West Indies and was employed to carry gunpowder. He was also very good at playing the fife.

== Capture by Hyder ==
In 1780, when Scurry was 14 years old, he set on a voyage from Plymouth Sound on the Hannibal. However, he, along with his crew, were captured by the French in the Gulf of Bengal within 5 days sailing of Madras. They were handed over to Hyder Ali by the French admiral Suffren. Hyder deported Scurry and the 15 young men to Seringapatam. The 15 men were all circumcised, they were nominally converted to Islam and they were forcibly conscripted to Tipu's army. James Scurry was given the Islamic name, Shamsher Khan.

== Captivity ==
As soon as Scurry was captured, he was put in heavy leg-irons and marched into a strong prison. Later, Hyder ordered him and his crew to march to Bangalore. Scurry was then sent to Burrampour, a three-day march from Bangalore. The food offered was rice for the first eight to ten days, which was then changed to Ragi flour. Scurry had the misfortune of being overlooked, along with 100 other English prisoners in the prisoner release incorporated in the treaty of 1784.

== Escape from captivity ==
Scurry on his own account explains how he escaped from the fort of Chitterdroog (Chitradurga). Once he tried to escape with some more of his colleagues, but after some distance, returns on fears of being spotted. Again, he escapes in the next try, but this time, they venture into the forest to avoid being detected. They camp in multiple places, and try entering a couple of forts. They finally seek the help of Marathas in a fort, from where they leave for the English encampments in a fort north of Karnataka. He was greeted by an old Scottish colleague, Mr. Little, who was startled to find Scurry and his companions in the ragged uniform of Tipu's army. James further narrates how they are redeployed, and marched backwards to the Carnatic to help plan the final assault on Mysore by Lord Cornwallis. Due to some circumstances, his friends are divided into two groups, and one group is sent to Bombay, and he is sent to Madras. In Madras, he boards Dutton, a ship to send him back to England, and he reaches Down in England. He also tells that even though his release was negotiated between Tipu and the British, it was not implemented for reasons unknown. Instead he was abruptly shifted along with many other prisoners to Chitterdroog. During this shift, James fears for his life, as he was taken to a place where some of his colleagues Captain Rumney, and Lieutenants Fraser and Sampson, had their throats cut.

Scurry left behind his wife and child, a girl. He had grown to love her, and in his memoir describes the immense pain he felt in having to part from them in the night as his battalion was being mustered and his decision of escaping being made. After the 10-year captivity ended, James Scurry recounted that he had forgotten how to sit in a chair and use a knife and fork. His English was broken and stilted, having lost all his vernacular idiom. His skin had darkened to the 'swarthy complexion of negroes', and moreover, he had developed an aversion to wearing European clothes. Scurry later reverted to Christianity, upon his return to England.

== Life after return to England ==
After reaching England, Scurry took up many jobs first as a superintendent of a wholesale grocer, and then set up his own grocery business. In 1800, he married once more and had 8 children, of which only one son and one daughter survived. He moved on from his grocery business to join a colliery, and then as a steward for a merchant ship, and then moved back to London in 1816 to work for a coal wharf. His final job was to superintendent a mine, but due to cold weather, he developed severe cold and infection, and died in 1822, at the age of 57. He was buried in Exeter on 14 December 1822.

== Descriptions of conditions in Srirangapatna ==
James mentions the unbearable conditions during his captivity, and also describes the tribulations, and pain he went through during his incarceration. Here are some of his comments

Initiation of prisoners of war including James into Islam:

He addressed us in the most endearing, though hypocritical, language, and gave us to understand, that we were to be circumcised, and made Mohammedans of, by the express order of Hyder.

Method of killing people who refused to convert or try to escape from prison:

But his most common mode of punishment was, that of drawing to death by the elephant's feet; the manner of which was as follows: the poor wretches (for several were drawn at one time) first had their arms tied behind them, above the elbows, and then a rope put about the small of their legs, which was fastened to the elephant's foot. This being done, the criminals stood with their backs towards the elephant's posteriors, waiting sometimes an hour for an order for their execution. The distance they stood from the beast was about six yards, and the first step the elephant took would throw the poor unfortunates on their faces; thus they would be dragged over rough and smooth ground till dead, and with no faces left

Common use of cutting hands, ears and noses as punishment:

About this period, in the year 1785, he seemed more bent on barbarities, than at any other time that I was in his country. It was not unfrequently that two or three hundred noses and ears would be exhibited in the public market, but to whom they belonged we could not learn. We must, however, leave these tragic scenes awhile, and turn to something less horrible.

Tipu not honouring prisoner exchange by shifting prisoners from one camp to another or killing them:

Tippoo's force at this time was equal to any, single-handed, in India; but the Company not pressing their demands, or from some other cause, for scurry's captivity which we could not account, our lives were spared. At the expiration of six months, we were again joined, and marched back to the capital, where we were put in a square by ourselves, wondering what they were going to do with us next; our guards, however treated us civilly, which we looked on as a good omen

The scheme of threat and punishment to collect revenue from various quarters:

On their arrival, they were sent for by the paymaster- general, who would address them mildly, stating, that he had received information they were worth a certain sum of money, which he named, and that he wanted so much for his master's services. If the proposal was acceded to, all was well, and perhaps he 'would be put in a more lucrative situation; but a denial, or a supposed prevarication, was sure to be accompanied with the most exquisite tortures. In this process, the first mode was, piquetmg for a given number of hours; then, if this was found of no avail, the addition of scourging, if this also proved ineffectual, needles, fixed in corks, were incessantly applied to their bodies, while still under the scourge. This mode of punishment continued several days;

James description of Seringapatam:

Its appearance, at about three miles' distance, was calculated to strike every beholder, being distinguished by magnificent buildings and ancient pagodas, the grand resi-dence of their Swarmy, or deity, contrasted the more lofty and splendid monuments lately erected in honour of the Mohammedan faith

The systematic rape of girls collected and captured from various parts of his kingdom was described by James. In this paragraph, James and his colleagues are forced to have sex with local girls captured from Tipu's kingdom or otherwise. The reason why Tipu chose to let prisoners have the captured women is not known, but it seems that it could have served various purposes. One was to humiliate the women themselves. Second, could have been to provide restraint to the prisoners, so it would serve as a deterrent for them to escape, as many of them had children with these women, and married them as well. Later in the story, James narrates how a British officer, could not escape the prison camp, as their guilt of leaving the women behind, kept them from escaping. So, the intent of letting the British prisoners consummate those women, was indeed useful in that regard.

We were one day strangely informed, that each of us, who was of proper age, was to have a wife; for this piece of news we were extremely sorry, but there was no possibility of our preventing their designs. There were, at this time, a number of young girls, who had been driven with their relations out of the Carnatic, when Hyder infested that country, which he almost over-ran, as already stated. Some of these poor creatures were allotted for us; and one morning, we were ordered to fall into rank and file, when those girls were placed one behind each of us, while we stood gazing at one another, wondering what they were about to do. At last, the Durga gave the word, "To the right about face;" with the addition (in the Moorish language) of "take what is before you." This, when understood, some did, and some did not; but the refractory were soon obliged to comply. Thus they fed their vanity, by making our first interview as ludicrous as possible, each being by this means supplied with a piece of furniture, for which, however valuable in general, we had neither want nor inclination. When this ceremony was completed, we were ordered back to our square, and on our return with our young black doxies, we had the bazaar, or public market, to pass, where the crowd was so diffi- cult to penetrate, as to separate us. This laid the foundation for some serious disputes afterwards, many insisting that the women they had, when they arrived at the square, were not the same they had at first. This scene was truly comic, for the girls, when we understood them, which was many months afterwards, had the same views that we had; and were frequently engaged with their tongues, on this score, long before we could understand the cause of their disputes. Our enemies seemed to enjoy this in a manner that would have done honour to a British theatre.

== Account of the Captivity ==
The following is James's first-hand account of the treatment of Mangalorean Catholic captives. Also this is the first time, James mentions that Tipu had converted some of the Hindu temples into prisons or dungeons. The practice of capturing women and passing them on as slaves to officers, and moving some of them to his harem is also mentioned.

Now followed the fate of the poor Malabar Christians,^{[a]} of which I shall consider myself the innocent cause, in reading what was written by General Mathews, as stated in the preceding note. Their country was invested by Tippu's army, and they were driven men, women and children to the number of 30,000 to Sirangapatam where all who were fit to carry arms were circumcised and forwarded into four battalions. The sufferings of these poor creatures were most excruciating: one circumstance which came under my immediate notice, I will attempt to describe: when recovered they were armed and drilled, and ordered to Mysore, nine miles from the capital, but for what purpose we could not learn. Their daughters were many of them beautiful girls; and Tippu was determined to have them for his seraglio; but this they refused; and Mysore was invested by his orders, and the four battalions were disarmed and brought prisoners to Sirangapatam. This being done, the officers tied their hands behind them. The Chambars or Sandalmakers were then sent for and their noses, ears, and upper lips were cut off. They were then mounted on asses, their faces towards the tail and led through Patan, with a wretch before them proclaiming their crime. One fell from his beast and expired on the spot through loss of blood. Such a mangled and bloody scene excited the compassion of numbers and our hearts were ready to burst at the inhuman sight. It was reported that Tippu relented in this case, and I rather think it true, as he never gave any further orders respecting their women. The twenty-six that survived were sent to his different arsenals where after the lapse of a few years I saw several of them lingering out a most miserable existence. No doubt many of them survived the downfall of Tippu and I should have been proud to hear that the Company had done something for those brave unfortunate men, and particularly so as all their miseries originated from an English general. The prison from whence the Malabar Christians were brought to have their noses and ears cut off for refusing their daughters when Tippu demanded them for his seraglio was a horrid dismal hole which we named the Bull, as there was an image, considerably larger than life, of that animal on that building, which was originally designed for a Hindoo place of worship, but by Tippu converted into a dungeon. This prison we frequently passed and expected sooner or later to occupy some part of it. Very few who were so unfortunate to be confined here, escaped with less punishment than the loss of their nose and ears. The Chambars by whom the operation was performed are held in abhorrence by the Mahomedans, and, on that account they were consigned to this office; and such was their brutality that they frequently cut, (or sawed rather), the upper lip off with the nose leaving the poor unfortunate wretch a pitiable object, to spin out a most miserable existence, being always sent to Tippu's arsenals to hard labour on a scanty allowance.

== Musings of Scurry about Tipu and his reign ==
Scurry noted the esteem in which Tipu was held in Britain, though he condemned the methods of cruelties that he unleashed on his subjects and prisoners of war:

Since our arrival in England, we have ofttimes heard him extolled for a brave prince; but those who have thus stated, we presume, know little of hira. That he was a coward, we could easily demonstrate, and that he was a tyrant, equal, if not superior, to a Domitian, a Caligula, a Nero, or even Nabis the tyrant of Sparta, is a fact of which we had ocular demonstration. For vigorously defending his country against any power on earth, I give him credit, and for using every exertion in expelling all its invaders; but this should have been done without those unheard-of cruelities, which were interwoven in his very nature;—but he is gone, and I proceed.

Scurry also contrasted the practises of Tipu with those of the European powers and his reputation among Europeans in India who knew him:

It is not among the customs of European nations to war with the dead, otherwise the remains of such a tyrant, whose peculiar aversion towards, and inveterate cruelty exercised on, the English, whenever they were so unfortunate as to become subject to his tyranny, might have been treated with indignity. The rooted and barbarous antipathy which he manifested against his prisoners in a former war, seems to have accompanied him to the last. About twenty unhappy stragglers from our army had fallen into his hands in the course of our march, among whom was a little drummer-boy of the Scotch brigade; all these he ordered to be put to death. Even his small motley band of French auxiliaries, execrate his memory as a most cruel tyrant, and represent, with bitter imprecations, the ignominy and hardships to which he subjected them.

== See also ==
- Captivity of Mangalorean Catholics at Seringapatam
