= Mangalorean Catholic literature =

Mangalorean Catholic literature is diverse.

== History ==
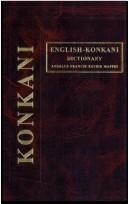
English-Konkani dictionary (2001 reprint)

Mangalorean Catholics have immensely contributed towards Media Activities in Mangalore, Bombay and other cities in India. The Konkani Dirvem was the first Konkani language periodical to be published in Mangalore in 1912. The founder-editor of Konkani Dirvem was the great poet Louis Mascarenhas.
After the Konknni Dirvem, came Raknno weekly in 1938 as an organ of the Diocese of Mangalore. A succession of brilliant priest-editors beginning with Sylvester Menezes, Alexander D’Souza, Mark Waldar, Vincent Menezes, Samuel Sequeira and the current editor Eric Crasta has transformed Raknno as a literary medium and in the process bringing countless writers into the limelight. G.M.B. Rodrigues was the first Mangalorean to start a Konkani Weekly Sukh-Dukh in Bombay in 1948. In 1949, George Fernandes brought out a monthly Konknni Yuvak. Other periodicals of those times were Amchi Mai, Sevak, Ange, Jezu Rai, Kala Kiran, Samajicho Divo, Samajichem Ful, Prakas, Uzvad, Amchem Konkan, Maiganv, Bhingari, Dublleancho Bhav, Sant Ritachi Vordi, Catholic Yuvak etc. Poinnari, a Weekly, was started in Bombay in 1950 and its first editor was the well-known novelist V.J.P. Saldanha. Later on, the famous poet and dramatist Cha. Fra. D'costa became its editor.
Felix Noronha is a renowned Konkani writer, who wrote the words for the Konkani hymn Dulob Jezu that was set to the tune of the English hymn 'What a Friend we have in Jesus'. The well-known novelist and writer J.S. Alvares brought out Mithr, a Weekly in 1953 and Jhelo a Fortnightly in 1956 in Bombay. A.A. Saldanha, J.B. Moraes and V.M. Fernandes experimented on the model of Reader's Digest by bringing out a monthly Konkani journal titled Konkan Daiz in 1958. Cha.
Fra. D'Costa started periodicals like Zaag-maag, Vishal Konkan, Jivit and Udev one after the other. Kannik a fortnightly from Mangalore was one more periodical started by a Mangalorean Catholic Raymond Miranda in 1965. Since 1994, the Catholic Sabha of Mangalore is bringing out Amcho Sandesh a monthly, as its organ. Amar Konkani a half-yearly research oriented journal was started in Mangalore in 1980 by the Konkani Institute of the St. Aloysius College. Divo Weekly was started in Bombay in the year 1995 with its founder-editor being J.B. Moraes.
