= Our Lady of Mercy of Ullal =

Church in Ullal, India

Church of Our Lady of Mercy of Ullal (Portuguese: Igreja Nossa Senhora das Mercês de Velala) is a Roman Catholic Church built by the Portuguese in 1568 at Ullal, near Mangalore. The church was mentioned by the Italian traveller Pietro Della Valle, who visited Mangalore in 1623.

Ullal-Panir, a Catholic mission centre, is situated 15 km South of Mangalore, the district headquarters. It is an extensive mission spread over three taluks namely Bantwal, Mangalore and Manjeshwar and consists of over 10 villages. The parishioners are generally poor, small and marginal farmers or daily wage earners. The total Catholic population is 2147. Ullal-Panir is the place where the Apostle of Sri. Lank Blessed Joseph Vas had worked about 320 years ago.
