= Captivity of Nairs at Seringapatam =

1786–1799 event in Mysore

The captivity of Nairs at Seringapatam was imposed on the Nairs of Malabar by Tipu Sultan, the de facto ruler of the Kingdom of Mysore from 1786 to 1799. They were subjected to forcible conversions to Sunni Islam, the official religious sect sanctioned by the Ottoman Caliphate, whose approval and alliance was sought by Tipu Sultan. Those who refused conversions had to face many humiliations, hardships, torture, and even death. The Nairs were treated with extreme brutality due to their strong adherence to the Hindu faith and martial tradition. The captivity ended when Nair troops from Travancore defeated Tipu in the Third Anglo-Mysore War. It is estimated that out of the 30,000 Nairs put to captivity (including women and children), only a few hundred returned to Malabar alive.

North Malabar was divided into the Nair principalities of Chirakkal, Kadatanad, Kottayam, Kurangoth, Iruvazhinad, kurumbranad and the Moplah principality of Cannanore which owed nominal allegiance to Chirakkal. South Malabar was divided between the Zamorin of Calicut and the Raja of Cochin.

== Nairs under Hyder Ali ==
The period of Sultan of Mysore Hyder Ali’s conquest of Malabar between 1766 and 1793 was met with stiff opposition from the local Nairs. In 1766, he marched into Palakkad and Malabar, followed by another march into Malabar via Thamarassery ghat in 1767. Hyder quickly understood the Nair psyche and caste pride and decided to use it to facilitate conversions. To this end, he deprived Nairs of caste privileges, equating them to Paravas, prohibited them from carrying arms, and outlawed them. Furthermore, he offered privileges back to anybody who converted to Islam. This forced many Nairs and some members of the Hindu community to adopt Islam, and resulted in the first appearance of Islam in the Malabar countryside. Humiliated by these perceived slights imposed by the Sultan, the Nairs rose in rebellion. They harassed isolated block-houses set up by Hyder, raided, pillaged, and destroyed stores and munition dumps.

Ayaz Khan was a Nair from Chirakkal who had been taken prisoner by Hyder during the latter's Malabar campaign of 1766. He became a Muslim and was enlisted in the Asad-i-Ilahi (new converts) troops. Finding favour with Hyder Ali, in 1779 he became Governor of Chitaldroog and in 1782 of Bednur. The British approached him and he rejected their overtures, but after Hyder's death he agreed to support them and handed over Bednur to them.

== Nairs under Tipu Sultan ==
=== Related Letters ===
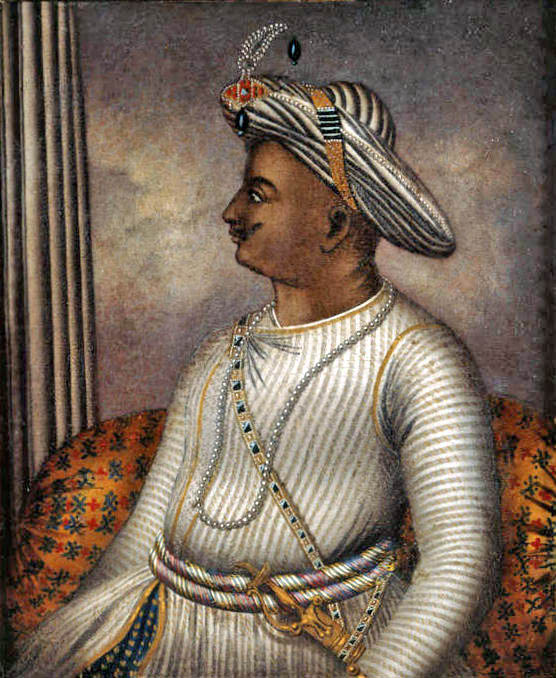
Tipu Sultan (1750–1799), the architect of the Seringapatam Captivity

In his letter to the Governor of Bekal, Budruz Zaman Khan, in the year 1200 AH (1785 AD), Tipu approved of forced conversions of Nairs:

"Your two letters, with the enclosed memorandums of the Nâimâ (Nair) captives, have been received. You did right in causing a hundred and thirty-five of them to be circumcised, and in putting eleven of the youngest of these into the Usud Ilhye band, and the remaining ninety-four into the Ahmedy troops, consigning the whole, at the same time, to the charge of the Kiladar of Nugr (Bednore).

In May of the same year, an order was sent to the Faujdar of Calicut, Arshad Ali Baig, pertaining to the treatment of a Nair dissident:

"Getting possession of the villain, Goorkul, and of his wife and children, you must forcibly make Mussalmans out of them, and then dispatch the whole under a guard to Seringapatam."

=== Proclamation ===
In 1788, Tipu issued a proclamation to the Nairs of Malabar, wherein he outlined his new scheme of social reform among Nair quoting their polygamy and polyandry:.

"It has been twenty-four years since I conquered this place. During this time, as an aggressive and obstinate crowd, you have waged wars, causing the loss of lives of many of my martyrs during your rainy seasons. Let that be so; what is past is past. From now on, all of you must accept my rule, live obediently paying taxes, and remain a good populace. If you are still not ready to live like other human societies, I say once again: I will forcibly convert all of you to Islam."

— A. Sreedhara Menon, Tippu Sultan, Kerala District Gazetteers, Volume 3, A. Sreedhara Menon Superintendent of Government Presses, 1965 - Kerala (India) (pp 155-156)

His proclamation was met with widespread resentment and consequently, Zamorin of calicut killed himself inside his palace by burning it while his family took protection at Travancore, the Nair of Malabar fled to Travancore. Due to fear 30,000 Brahmins fled to Travancore. The Kottayam and Kadattanand Rajas sought protection from the English East India Company. In November 1788, Tipu's forces attacked Calicut and captured the Karanavappad of Manjeri. Tipu set 6,000 troops under his French commander, M. Lally to raise the siege, but failed to defeat Ravi Varma.

=== Captives ===
The following year in 1789 Tipu sent Gulam Ali, Gaji Khan and Darvedil Khan with troops into Coorg by way of Siddhesvara. where they took up strong positions, seized grain, men, women and children while burning houses that they pillaged. They set fire to the Padinalkanadu temple. Later the 'Maleyalam' (Malabar region) people joined the Coorgs. Tipu sent Gulam Ali into Malabar but en route Gulam was attacked by the Coorgs. Gulam managed to reach Malabar where he burnt down the Payyavur temple and attacked that region.

That same year (1789), when Tipu was marching against the Nairs at Calicut who had become rebellious, he heard of another rebellion in Coorg. He sent a force towards Coorg under Burhan ud Din and Sayed Hamid. Tipu himself crossed the Tamarasseri(Tamrachadi) Ghat and entered Malabar region. There he ordered some of the inhabitants to be converted (made Asadulai), placed Officer Ghafar in command there and had a wooden fort or stockade built.

Tipu had halted in the Malabar to enforce his proclamation. General orders were issued to his army that 'every being in the district without distinction should be burned, that they should be traced to their lurking places, and that all means of truth and falsehood, force or fraud should be employed to effect their universal conversion'. The Raja of Cherkal (Chirakkal, Kannur) fled to Tellicherry but when he was intercepted he killed himself. Then his body was dragged round the camp and hung from a tree. Tipu besieged the Kadattanad Raja's fortified palace at Kuttipuram, and 2,000 Nairs—forced to surrender after a resistance of several days. Several Rajas and wealthy land owners fled to Travancore, where the Dharma Raja helped them to rehabilitate themselves in their new surroundings. On the other hand, Nairs retreated into the jungles where they engaged in guerrilla warfare against the invading Mysorean army. Tipu further organised a regular and systematic hunt for Nairs. He then proceeded to Cannanore and after celebrating the marriage of his son with the daughter of the Ali Raja, marched along the coast of Chowghat. He then made arrangements for the administrative reorganisation of the province, and retired to Coimbatore, leaving a permanent occupying force to frighten and subjugate the local population.

== See also ==
- Mysorean invasion of Kerala
- Captivity of Mangalorean Catholics at Seringapatam
- Captivity of Kodavas at Seringapatam
