= Victor R. Fernandes =

Bishop Victor R. Fernandes was the Bishop of the Mangalore Diocese from 1931 to 1955.
