= Kirangur =

- Village
- Location in Karnataka, India
- Coordinates: 12°25′56″N 76°41′58″E
- Country: India
- State: Karnataka
- District: Mandya
- Talukas: Srirangapatna

Government
  - Body: Grama Panchayath

Area
  - Total: 9.64 km^{2} (3.72 sq mi)
- Elevation: 693 m (2,274 ft)

Population (2011)
  - Total: 7,653
  - Density: 794/km^{2} (2,060/sq mi)

Languages
  - Official: Kannada
- Time zone: UTC+5:30 (IST)
- PIN: 571807
- Vehicle registration: KA-11

Kirangur is a village in the southern state of Karnataka, India. It is located in the Srirangapatna taluk of Mandya district in Karnataka.

== Demographics ==
As of 2001 India census, Kirangur had a population of 7087 with 3549 males and 3538 females.

== See also ==
- Mandya
- Srirangapatna
- Districts of Karnataka
