= Omzoor =

Omzoor Meramajal
- Parish
- Country: India
- State: Karnataka
- District: Dakshina Kannada
- Talukas: Bantwal

Languages
  - Official: Konkani, Tulu, kannada
- Time zone: UTC+5:30 (IST)
- PIN: 574143
- Nearest city: Mangalore

Omzoor is situated at a distance of 14 km from Mangalore to the north east and is surrounded by Neermarga, Belloor, Modankap, Fermai parishes.

Omzoor is also known as Arkul and Mermajal. This parish is one of the three ancient parishes of the Mangalore diocese. In 1568, a Franciscan priest built a church at Arkula, where presently Nitya Sahaaya Maatha High School is situated. This place is very near to the present church structure. Arkula church was later closed and in between 1601 and 1625 it was re-established and dedicated to the Holy Family. Bangera kings of Nandavar donated the land to build the present Holy Family Church at Omzoor. After the return of the Christians from the captivity at Srirangapattana in 1799, the church was rededicated and Fr Joachim Manuel Mendis became the first parish priest of the re-dedicated church. Omazoor is the Mother Church of Belloor (1920), Kelarai (1935) and Neermarga (1968). A shed that was built at Fermai by Fr Andrew D’Souza was officially erected in 1999 as chapel and later, on 20 May 2004 into a parish. He has built a presbytery cum hall at the basement and a church above it.

During the last 150 years the church building has undergone many renovations, additions and other improvements according to the needs of the time. Fr Aloysius Rodrigues (1953-1973) renovated and remodelled the building and it was blessed on 27 November 1959. Fr Andrew D’Souza (1997) renovated the church façade and changed the flooring. He also repaired and added a few rooms to the presbytery. He obtained w acres of land from Gilbert D’Souza of Kodman and 1-acre (4,000 m^{2}) from the family of Archbishop Alphonsus Mathias at Kodman free of cost with a view of building a church there. Rev. Fr. William Menezes is the 51st parish priest of Omzoor since 1759.
