= St. Aloysius, Mangaluru =

Private Jesuit University in Mangaluru, India

St. Aloysius (Deemed to be University)
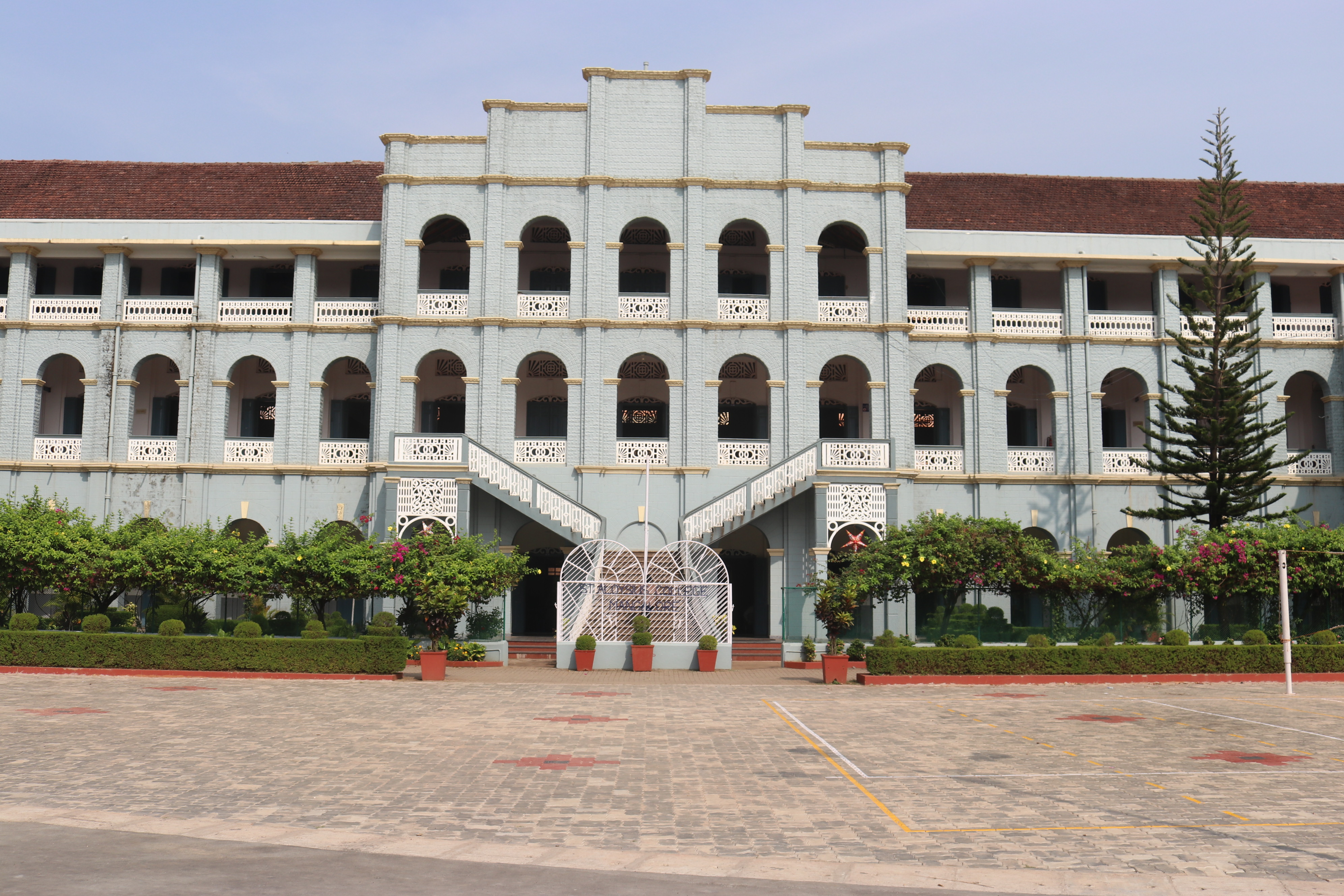
- Motto: Lucet et Ardet (Latin)
- Motto in English: Shine to Enkindle
- Type: Private research non-profit co-educational university
- Established: 1880; 146 years ago
- Religious affiliation: Catholic Church (Jesuit)
- Chancellor: Rev. Fr. Dionysius Vaz SJ
- Vice-Chancellor: Rev. (Dr.) Praveen Martis SJ
- Faculty: 303
- Undergraduates: 5436
- Postgraduates: 1587
- Location: MSS Road (Previously known as Lighthouse hill road), Kodialbail, Mangaluru, Karnataka, India
- Campus: Urban, 37 acres
- Website: Official website

St. Aloysius (Deemed to be University) is a private, coeducational, Jesuit deemed university, founded in 1880 as St. Aloysius College and located in Mangaluru, Karnataka, India. The institution specializes in academic programs in the humanities, commerce, science, technology, and management.

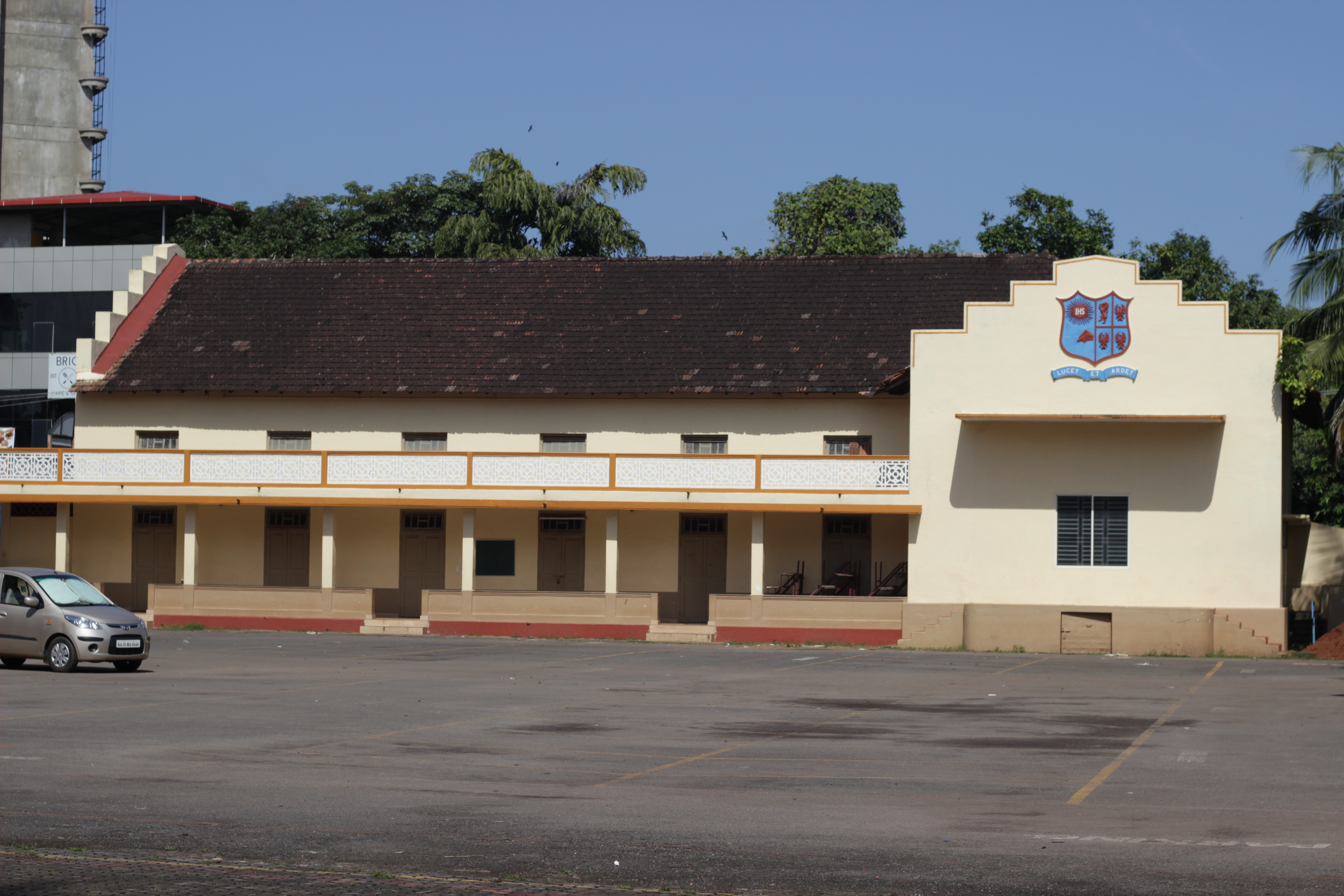
Old hall of St. Aloysius College

The National Assessment and Accreditation Council (NAAC) accredited St Aloysius with A++ grade with a cumulative grade point average (CGPA) of 3.67 out of 4.0 in the fourth cycle of accreditation in April 2023. The institution has been sanctioned 'DDU Kaushal Centre' for the years 2015-17 under the 12th Plan Scheme by the Indian government.

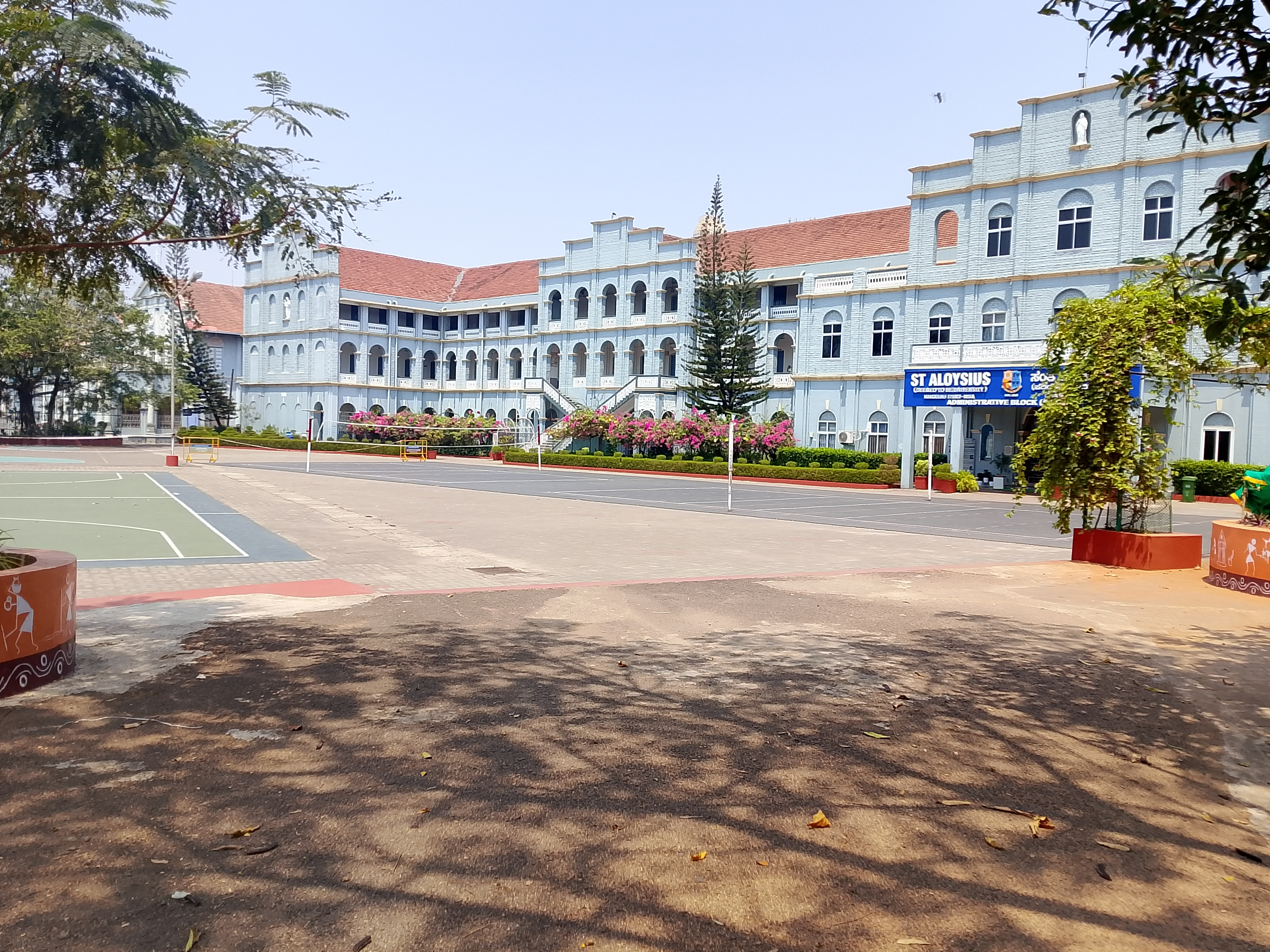
The front of the college building

The institution was awarded STAR Status under the Govt of India's Department of Biotechnology and is extended to the second phase. It has been recognised as a "College with Potential for Excellence" by the University Grants Commission (UGC) also for the second phase. The institution has been sanctioned Community College Scheme by UGC and the state government has given grants to the college to start the Biotechnology Finishing School (BTFS).

The college is ranked 58th among colleges in India by the National Institutional Ranking Framework (NIRF) in 2024.

== History ==
Founded in 1880, the college's name reflects its early history as a liberal arts college and preparatory school (now St. Aloysius College High School) on the same campus. It was affiliated with the University of Madras in 1882.

In 1999, the college launched its first full-fledged master's program, Master of Computer Application (MCA), followed by Master of Business Administration (MBA) in 2004. This led to the inauguration of a new campus on the outskirts of Mangaluru known as Aloysius Institute of Management and Information Technology (AIMIT) in 2008.

In 2007, the college was granted autonomous status. The University Grants Commission and Union Ministry of Education approved status of Deemed to be University to the college on 19 January 2024.

== Vice Chancellor ==
- Rev. Dr. Praveen Martis, SJ is the first and current Vice Chancellor of the University.

== Courses ==
As of 2017, the college is both an undergraduate college and a post-graduate college with 4138 undergraduate students and 1532 postgraduate students.

The University offers 17 post-graduate courses. St. Aloysius University Advanced Research Centre was inaugurated on 6 February 2012. There are 53 research scholars working for the Ph.D. under these guides. PG Department of Chemistry and PG Department of Management (MBA) have successfully completed six months of course work for seven and six research students during 2013-14.

== Model United Nations Programmes ==
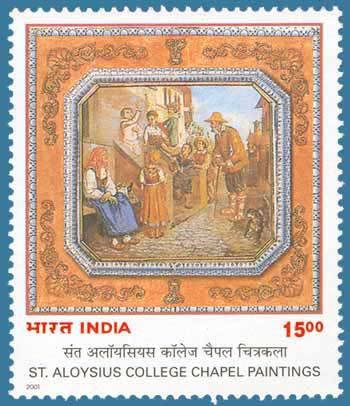
St. Aloysius College Chapel Paintings Stamp of India - 2001

St. Aloysius College has been the first to start MUN programmes in Mangalore and has held multiple editions till now. Several noted professionals like Dr Edmond Fernandes, Former Consultant to UNESCAP and Founder, CHD Group, Justice Santhosh Hegde, Former Lokayukta, Giselle Metha, Former IRS Officer & Entrepreneur, Ms. Shanthipriya, Principal Accountant General have been guests at these events in the past.

== Notable alumni ==
- Aravind Adiga — winner of the Man Booker Prize
- Anant Agarwal — Padma Shri recipient, MIT professor, and edX CEO
- George Fernandes — former Union Defence Minister
- K. V. Kamath — chairman, ICICI Bank, India
- Brian J. G. Pereira — physician
- V. J. P. Saldanha — Konkani language littérateur, dramatist, novelist, and poet
- Deepa Sannidhi — actress
- Devi Prasad Shetty — surgeon
- Kottayan Katankot Venugopal — senior advocate, Supreme Court of India
- Joachim Alva — lawyer, writer, and politician
- K. L. Rahul — Indian international cricketer
- Srinidhi Ramesh Shetty — actress
- V. G. Siddhartha — businessman (founder-owner Cafe Coffee Day franchise chain)
- Prabhu Mundkur — actor
- Sukumar Azhikode — writer, orator
- Govind Padmasoorya — actor and television presenter
- T.M.A Pai — founder of Manipal University
- Manvita Kamath — Kannada film actress

== See also ==
- List of Jesuit sites
- 2008 attacks on Christians in southern Karnataka
- Christianity in Karnataka
- St. Joseph's College, Bangalore
