= State Highway 64 (Karnataka) =

Road in Karnataka, India

State Highway 64

Route information
- Maintained by KPWD
- Length: 198.64 km (123.43 mi)

Location
- Country: India
- State: Karnataka
- Districts: Chikkamagaluru, Dakshina Kannada
- Primary destinations: Kadur, Chikkamagaluru, Mudigere, Bantwal

Highway system
- Roads in India; Expressways; National; State; Asian; State Highways in Karnataka

State Highway 64, referred to as Kadur - Mangalore Road, is a state highway that runs through two districts in the state of Karnataka. The total length of the highway is 198.64 km. A part of this highway, from Kaduru to Mudigere, has been upgraded as NH-173, and from there to Bantawala, it has been upgraded as NH-73.

This state highway touches numerous cities and villages Viz.Kadur, Sakharayapatna, Chikmagalur, Mudigere, Charmadi, Ujire, Belthangady, Bantwal, Vitla, Kepu.
