= Odadadka =

Odadadka is a beautiful place situated near the banks of the Netravati River, in Sarapady village, Bantwal taluk, Dakshina Kannada district, Karnataka state, India. It is well connected to taluk headquarters Bantwal through Poopadikatee by road.

== Industry ==
Mangalore Refinery and Petrochemicals Limited (MRPL) pump house, which supplies water to petroleum refineries in Mangalore, is located near it. There is also a dam which has been constructed across the Netravati River for electricity production.
