= History of Mangaluru =

The History of Mangaluru dates back to the 3rd century BC and has been ruled by a number of rulers. In the era of modern India, the area was controlled by the Portuguese in Goa and Bombay, who lost it to Shivappa Nayaka, who in turn lost it to Hyder Ali.

Until India's independence Mangaluru remained under the rule of British India who had taken over by defeating Tipu Sultan in the Third Anglo-Mysore War. Mangaluru which was a part of the Madras Presidency was merged into a unified Mysore State in 1956.

== Multilingual city ==
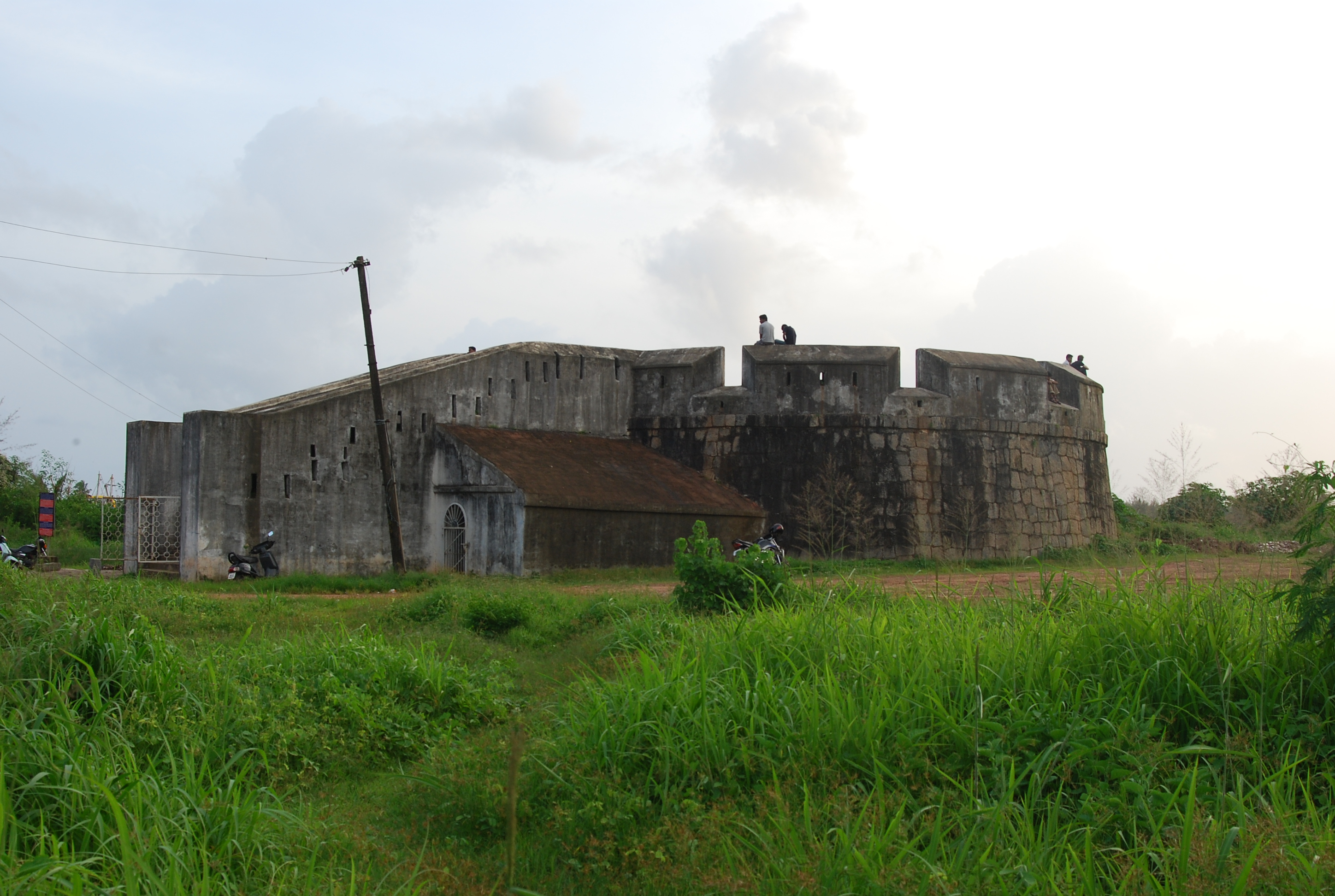
The Sultan Battery in Mangaluru, built in 1784 by Tipu Sultan to defend the city from British warships entering the Gurupura river

Mangaluru is the heart of a distinct multilinguistic—cultural region : Tulunadu a homeland of Tulu-speaking People, which was nearly coterminous with the modern district of South Canara. In the third century BC, the town formed part of the Maurya Empire, ruled by the Mauryan emperor, Ashoka of Magadha. From the third to sixth century AD, the Kadamba dynasty, whose capital was based in Banavasi in North Canara, ruled over the entire Canara region as independent rulers. From the middle of the seventh century to the end of the 14th century, the South Canara region was ruled by its own native Alupa rulers. An Old Malayalam inscription (Ramanthali inscriptions), dated to 1075 CE, mentioning king Kunda Alupa, the ruler of Alupa dynasty of Mangaluru, can be found at Ezhimala (the former headquarters of Mushika dynasty) near Cannanore, in the North Malabar region of Kerala. The Alupas ruled over the region as feudatories of major regional dynasties like the Chalukyas of Badami, Rashtrakutas of Manyakheta, Chalukyas of Kalyani, and Hoysalas of Dwarasamudra. During the reign of the Alupa king Kavi Alupendra (c. 1110 – c.1160), in the 1130s and 1140s, the city was home to the Arabic-speaking Tunisian Jewish merchant Abraham Ben Yiju.

== Ibn Battuta ==
The Moroccan traveller Ibn Battuta, who had visited the town in 1342, referred to it as Manjarur, and stated that the town was situated on a large estuary, called the "estuary of the wolf," and was the greatest estuary in the country of Malabar. By 1345, the Vijayanagara rulers brought the region under their control. During the Vijayanagara period (1345–1550), South Canara was divided into Mangalore and Barkur rajyas (provinces), and two governors were appointed to look after each of them from Mangalore and Barkur. But many times only one governor ruled over both Mangalore and Barkur rajyas, and when the authority passed into the hands of Keladi rulers (c. 1550–1763), they had a governor at Barkur alone. In 1448, Abdur Razzaq, the Persian ambassador of Sultan Shah Rukh of Samarkand, visited Mangalore, en route to the Vijayanagara court. The Italian traveller, Ludovico di Varthema, who visited India in 1506 says that he witnessed nearly sixty ships laden with rice ready for sail in the port of Mangalore.

== European influence ==
European influence in Mangaluru can be traced back to 1498, when the Portuguese explorer Vasco da Gama landed at St Mary's Island near Udupi, just after his arrival at Koyilandy, Kozhikode. In the 16th century, the Portuguese came to acquire substantial commercial interests in Canara. Krishnadevaraya (1509–1529), the then ruler of the Vijaynagara empire maintained friendly relations with the Portuguese. The Portuguese trade was gradually gathering momentum and they were striving to destroy the Arab and Moplah trade along the coast. In 1524, when Vasco da Gama heard that the Muslim merchants of Calicut had agents at Mangalore and Basrur, he ordered the rivers to be blockaded. In 1526, the Portuguese under the viceroyship of Lopo Vaz de Sampaio took possession of Mangalore. The coastal trade passed out of Muslim hands into Portuguese hands. In 1550, the Vijayanagara ruler, Sadashiva Raya, entrusted the work of administering the coastal region of Canara to Sadashiv Nayaka of Keladi. By 1554, he was able to establish political authority over South Canara. The disintegration of the Vijaynagara Empire in 1565 gave the rulers of Keladi greater power in dealing with the coastal Canara region. They continued the Vijayanagara administrative system. The two provinces of Mangalore and Barkur continued to exist. The Governor of Mangalore also acted as the Governor of the Keladi army in his province. In 1695, the town was torched by Arabs in retaliation for Portuguese restrictions on Arab trade. The 16th century work Tuhfat Ul Mujahideen written by Zainuddin Makhdoom II appears to be the first historical work written in detail about the contemporary history of Mangalore. It is written in Arabic and contains pieces of information about the resistance put up by the navy of Kunjali Marakkar alongside the Zamorin of Calicut from 1498 to 1583 against Portuguese attempts to colonize Tulu Nadu and Malabar coast.

== Mysore Sultans ==
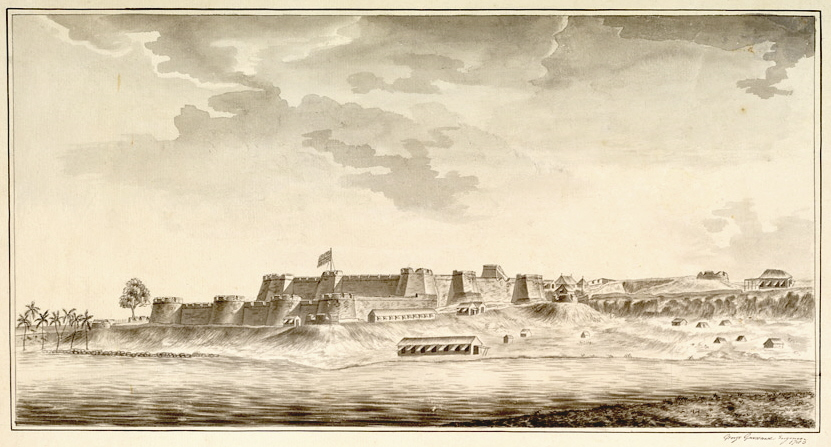
A pen and ink drawing of Mangalore Fort made in 1783, after it had been taken by the English East India Company

Hyder Ali, the de facto ruler of the Kingdom of Mysore, conquered Mangaluru in 1763, consequently bringing the city under his administration until 1767. Mangalore was ruled by the British East India Company from 1767 to 1783, but was subsequently wrested from their control in 1783 by Hyder Ali's son, Tipu Sultan; who renamed it Jalalabad. The Second Anglo–Mysore War ended with the Treaty of Mangalore, signed between Tipu Sultan and the British East India Company on 8 March 1784. After the defeat of Tipu at the Fourth Anglo–Mysore War, the city remained in control of the British, headquartering the Canara district under the Madras Presidency.

== Ancient port ==
According to the Scottish physician Francis Buchanan who visited Mangalore in 1801, Mangaluru was a rich and prosperous port with flourishing trading activity. Rice was the grand article of export, and was exported to Muscat, Bombay, Goa and Malabar. Supari or Betel-nut was exported to Bombay, Surat and Kutch. Pepper and Sandalwood were exported to Bombay. Turmeric was exported to Muscat, Kutch, Surat and Bombay, along with Cassia Cinnamon, Sugar, Iron, Saltpeter, Ginger, Coir and Timber.

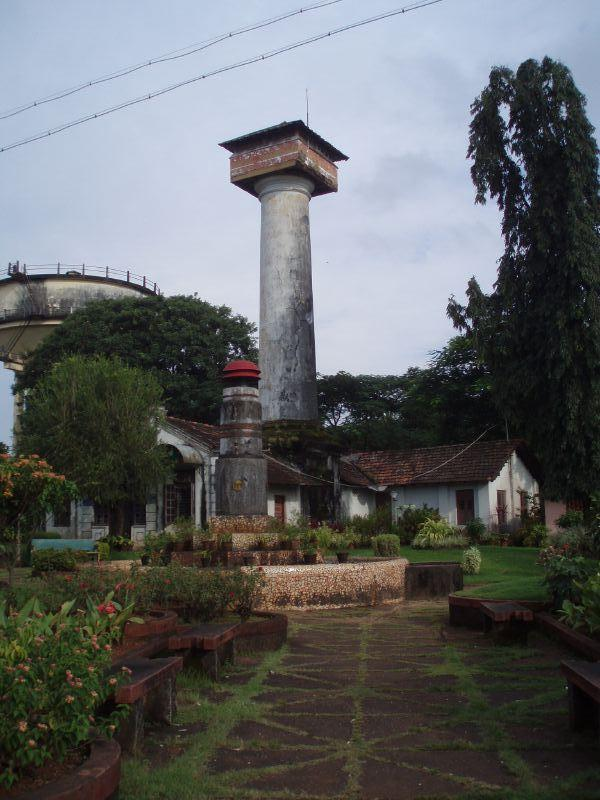
The Light House Hill tower in Light House Hill, Hampankatta, served as a watchtower for the British Navy.

== British period ==
The British colonial government did not support industrialisation in the region, and local capital remained invested mostly in land and money lending, which led to the later development of banking in the region. With the arrival of European missionaries in the early 19th century, the region saw the development of educational institutions and a modern industrial base, modelled on European industries. The opening of the Lutheran Swiss Basel Mission in 1834 was central to the industrialisation process. Printing press, cloth-weaving mills and tile factories manufacturing the famed Mangalore tiles were set up by the missionaries. When Canara (part of the Madras Presidency until this time) was bifurcated into North Canara and South Canara in 1859, Mangalore was transferred into South Canara and became its headquarters. South Canara remained under Madras Presidency, while North Canara was detached from Madras Presidency and transferred to Bombay Presidency in 1862. The enactment of the Madras Town Improvement Act (1865) mandated the establishment of the Municipal council on 23 May 1866, which was responsible for urban planning and providing civic amenities. The Italian Jesuits, who arrived in Mangalore in 1878, played an important role in education, economy, health, and social welfare of the city. The linking of Mangalore in 1907 to the Southern Railway, and the subsequent proliferation of motor vehicles in India, further increased trade and communication between the city and the rest of the country. The two world wars 1 and 2 saw the migration of natives of undivided Dakshina Kannada district to Mysore kingdom, other parts of Madras presidency and Bombay presidency. By the early 20th century, Mangalore had become a major supplier of educated manpower to Bombay, Bangalore, and the Middle East.

== Karnataka state ==
As a result of the States Reorganisation Act (1956), Mangalore (part of the Madras Presidency until this time) was incorporated into the dominion of the newly created Mysore State (now called Karnataka). Mangalore is the second largest city of Karnataka, and ninth largest port of India, providing the state with access to the Arabian Sea coastline. Mangalore experienced significant growth in the decades 1970–80, with the opening of New Mangalore Port in 1974 and commissioning of Mangalore Chemicals & Fertilizers Limited in 1976. Today, the Mangalore region is a nationally known higher education hub with a flourishing service sector, particularly in medical services, a small but growing IT regional hub, and a booming real estate and banking industry.

== Historical references ==
The first reference to Mangalore came from Pandyan king Chettian, who ruled the coastal region during 715 CE. He called the town Mangalapuram. Mangalore is identified to be at the center of the Satyaputra Kingdom. The region later evolved to become what is present-day South Canara, with the spread of Tulu language. There are many historical references regarding to the town. Cosmas Indicopleustes, a Greek monk referred to the port of Mangarouth. Pliny, a Roman historian made references of a place called Nithrias, and Greek historian Ptolemy referred to Nitre. Both the references were probably to the River Netravathi. Ptolemy had also mentioned this city of Mangalore in his work as Maganoor. Roman writer Arien called Mangalore Mandegora. A 7th-century copper inscription referred to Mangalore as Mangalapura. had ruled this place from 200 to 600 A.D. The ancient history proved that Mangalore had been the capital of Alupa dynasty until the 14th century. A traveler, Ibn Battuta who had visited the town in 1342 stated that he arrived at a place named Manjurun or Mandjaur situated on a large estuary. He had mentioned that the town was a trading centre and Persian and Yemeni merchants disembarked at Mangalore. In 1448, Abdul Razak, a Persian Ambassador passed via this route to Vijayanagar. He said that he had seen a glorious temple here. The inscriptions at Moodabidri stated a King Mangaras Odeya was the governor of Mangaluru Raajya during the reign of Vira Harihararaya II of Vijayanagar dynasty. Another inscription stated that Deeva Raaja Odeya ruled the Mangaluru Raajya in 1429 during the reign of Vijayanagara King Veera Devaraya II. Various powers have fought for control over Mangalore. The major dynasties that ruled the town till the arrival of Portuguese were the Western Chalukyas, Rashtrakutas and Hoysalas.

=== Mythological associations ===
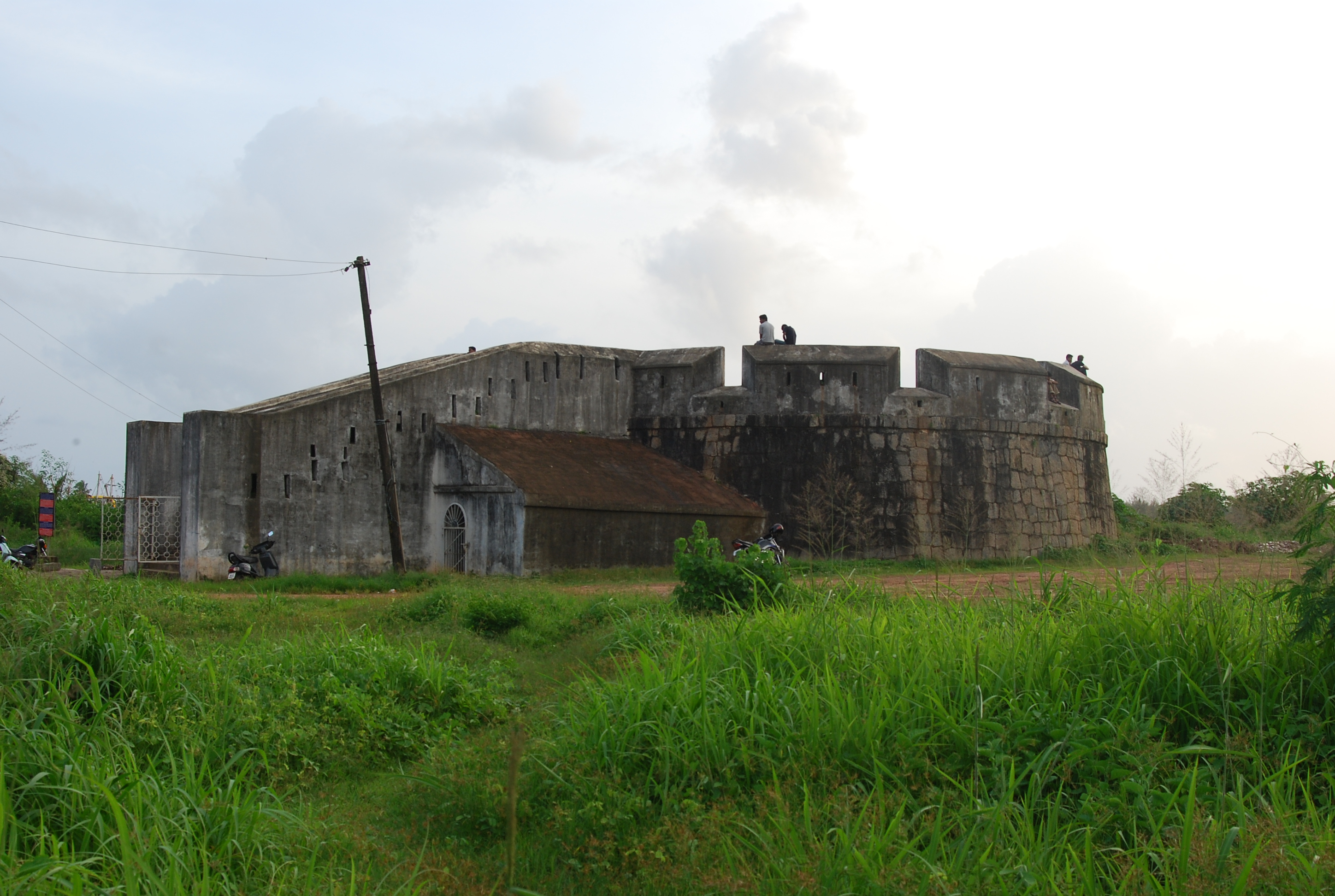
The Sultan Battery in Mangalore built in 1784 by Tippu Sultan to prevent British warships from entering the Gurupura river

According to Hindu mythology, the region covering Mangaluru was a part of the Parashurama Srishti, the coastal belt reclaimed from the sea by the legendary sage Parashurama. As for other mythological associations, Rama was the Lord of Kanara during the days of the Ramayana. Sahadeva, the youngest of the Pandavas, was the Governor of this place during the days of the Mahabharatha. The Pandavas lived in Banavasi during their exile visiting Sarapady near Mangalore. Arjuna, the hero of Mahabharata also appears to have visited this place when he travelled from Gokarna to Adur near Kasargod. It was the land of enchantment of Sahyadri mountains, where the great sages Kanva, Vysa, Vashista, Vishvamitra and others spent their days of meditation.

== Portuguese ==
The European influence in Mangaluru can be traced back to the year 1498, when the Portuguese explorer Vasco da Gama landed at St Mary's Islands near Mangaluru on his voyage from Portugal to India. In 1520 the Portuguese took control of the area from Vijayanagara rulers. During the 16th and 17th centuries, the Portuguese commanded the Arabian Sea from the port of Mangalore and they intruded actively in the affairs of the local chieftains. In 1695, the town was burnt by the Arabs in retaliation for Portuguese restrictions on Arab trade.

== Kingdom of Mysore ==
Hyder Ali (1722–1782) the ruler of Mysore conquered Mangaluru in 1763, and it was under his administration till 1768, before being annexed by the British between 1768 and 1794. Later in 1794 Hyder Ali's son Tippu Sultan again took control of the area. During his regime, the city was caught in the crossfires of Anglo-Mysore relations. The Second Anglo-Mysore War ended with the Treaty of Mangalore which was signed in Mangaluru between Tippu Sultan and the British East India Company on 11 March 1784.

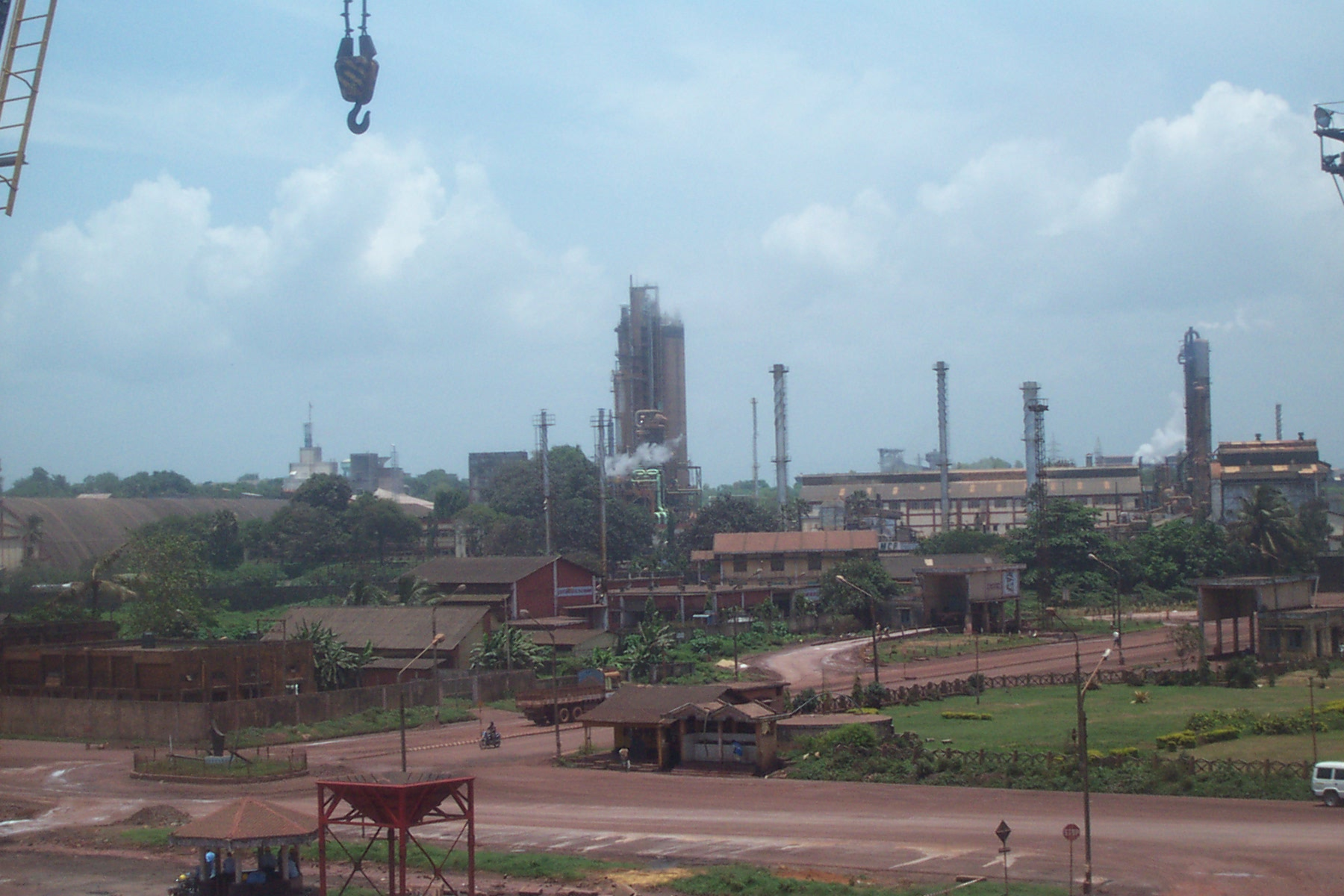
Mangalore witnessed an economic and industrial boom during the late twentieth century

The English again captured Mangaluru in 1791, but Tippu besieged it in 1793 and the English surrendered the city in 1794. With the death of Tippu Sultan and the fall of Srirangapatna during the Fourth Anglo-Mysore War in 1799, the city was recaptured by the British, and it remained under British administration till India's independence in 1947.

== British administration ==
The city had a peaceful administration under British rule and permanent visible improvements effected during this period. It flourished gradually in education and in industry and became a commercial centre for export and import trade. The linking of Mangalore, in 1907, with the Southern Railway and later the advent of motor vehicles further increased the trade and communication with the rich hinterland. The opening of the Basel Mission in 1834 brought many industries into the city.

== After independence ==
After India's independence in 1947, Mangaluru, which was a part of the Madras Presidency, was merged into a unified Mysore State in 1956. This provided the state with access to a coastline. In the late twentieth century, Mangaluru developed as a commercial and business center, while retaining traditional architecture and coastal fishing practices. More recently, the city has expanded its information technology sector and international operations.
