= Kurnad =

Village in Karnataka, India

Kurnad is a village in Bantwal taluk, Dakshina Kannada district, Karnataka, India. As of the 2011 Census of India, it had a population of 2,718 across 571 households. It is located approximately 30 kilometres (19 mi) north from the district headquarters of Mangalore, on NH-66.
