= Ajjibettu =

- village
- Ajjibettu is in Dakshina Kannada district
- Country: India
- State: Karnataka
- District: Dakshina Kannada
- Talukas: Bantval

Government
  - Body: Village Panchayat

Languages
  - Official: Tulu, Kannada
- Time zone: UTC+5:30 (IST)
- ISO 3166 code: IN-KA
- Vehicle registration: KA
- Nearest city: Mangalore
- Civic agency: Village Panchayat
- Website: karnataka.gov.in

Ajjibettu is a village in the southern state of Karnataka, India. It is located in the Bantval taluk of Dakshina Kannada district.

== See also ==
- Dakshina Kannada
- Districts of Karnataka
