= Vitla =

Vitla Vitla, Vittal
- Pattana Panchayath
- Vittal
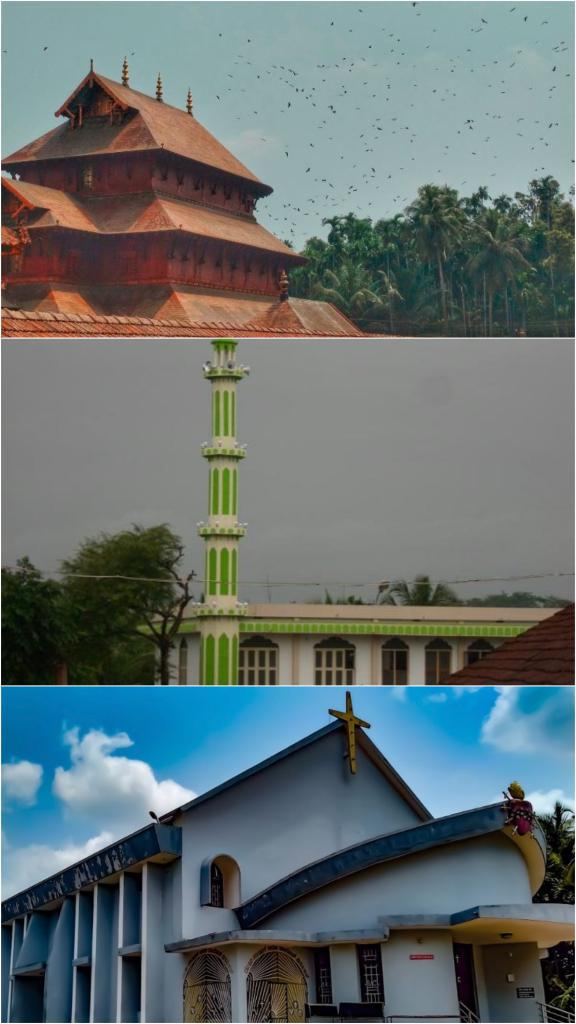
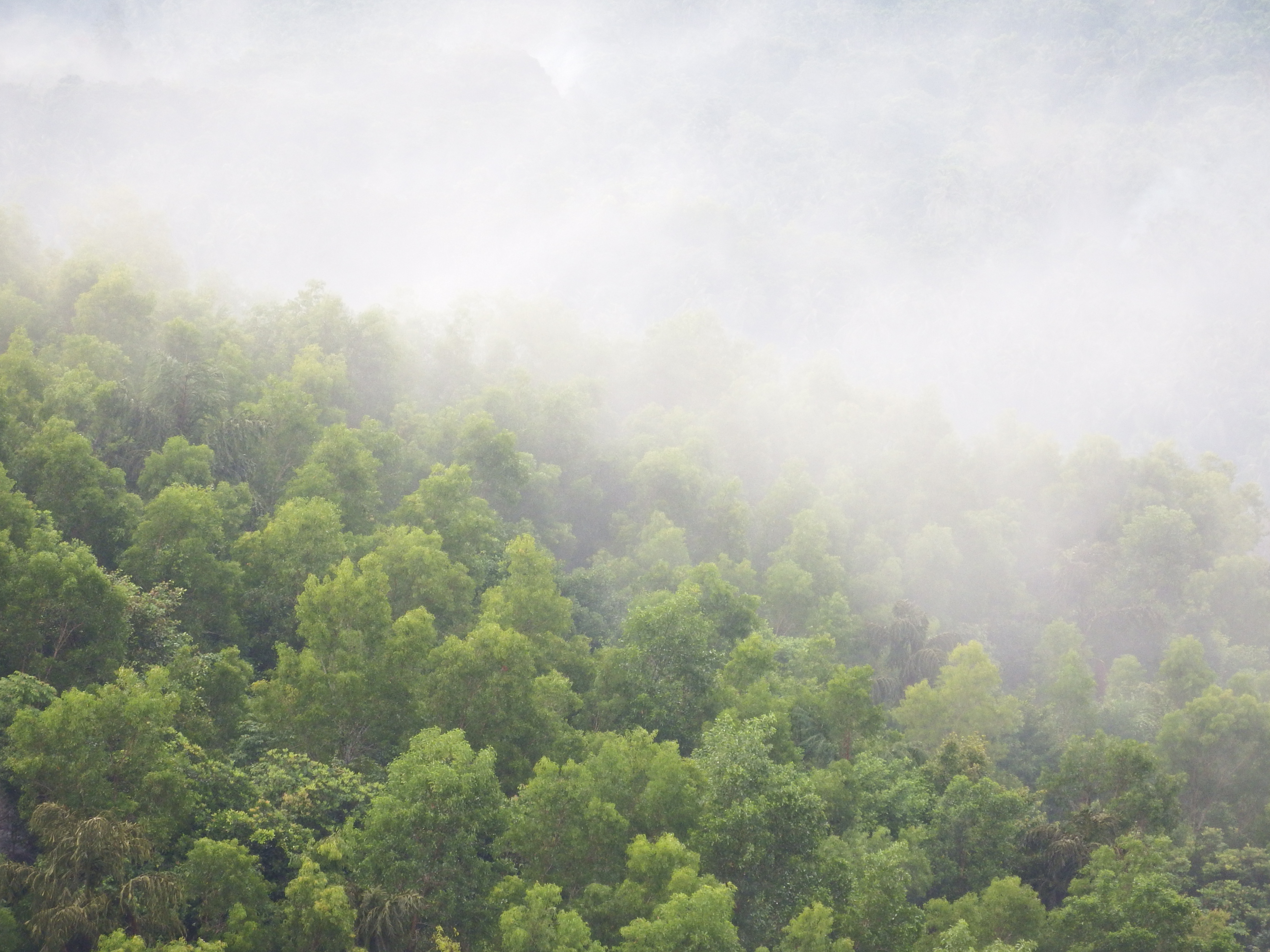
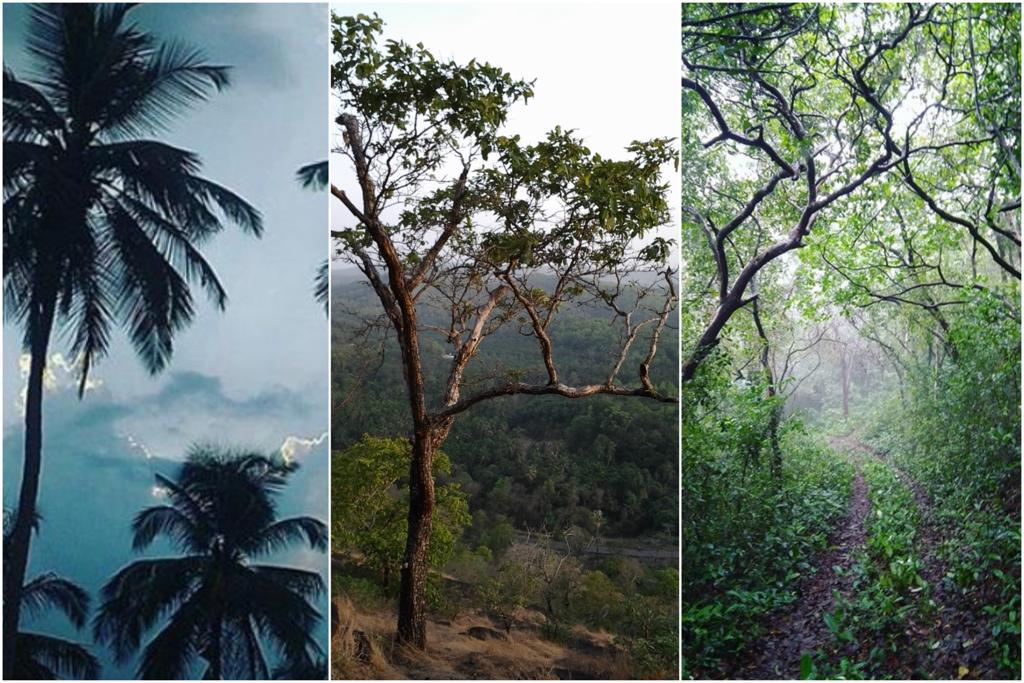
- Vitla architecture Kalenjimale forest towards Vitla Salethur road Vitla Top to Bottom:Vitla Shri Panchalingeshwara Temple, Vitla Mohiyuddin Juma Masjid, Church of Our Lady Dolours, Kalenjimale forest towards Vitla Salethur road covered in mist, Left to right: Coconut plantations in Bairikatte near Vitla, Hills Of Kelinja (also part of Kalenjimale), Roads through Sandalwood plantations in Ukkuda

- Location in Karnataka, India
- Coordinates: 12.766°N 75.122°E
- Country: India
- State: Karnataka
- District: Dakshina Kannada
- Region: Tulu Nadu/Coastal Karnataka
- Taluk: Bantwal taluk

Government
  - MLA: Ashok kumar rai (INC)
- Elevation: 100 m (330 ft)

Population (2011)
  - Total: 17,618

Languages
  - Official: Kannada, English
  - Regional: Tulu, Konkani, Beary, Koraga, Urdu, Havyaka
- Time zone: UTC+5:30 (IST)
- PIN: 574243
- Telephone code: 08255
- Vehicle registration: KA-19, KA-70
- Nearest city: Puttur
- Lok Sabha constituency: Mangalore
- Vidhan Sabha constituency: Puttur/ Bantwal
- Website: vitlatown.mrc.gov.in/

Vitla also Vittal is a town in Bantwal taluk of Dakshina Kannada district, India, around 18 km from Bantwal in Bantwal Taluk. It is also 14 km from Puttur and 40 km from Mangalore. Vitla was an assembly constituency of Karnataka Legislative Assembly, but discontinued from 2008 elections. Agriculture is the main occupation of people in and around Vitla town. Arecanut, cocoa, pepper, Cashew and coconut are grown here. There is a regional station of Central Plantation Crops Research Institute (CPCRI) which conducts research on areca nuts, an important commercial crop in the area. It also researches cocoa growing, including its production, protection and increasing drought resistance.

Formerly ruled by the Vittala Arasas or kings belonging to the Domba Heggade dynasty, the head of the dynasty, even today, plays a dominant role in the religious ceremonies of 16 temples. One can see the palace in the outskirts of Vittla. Standing in the middle of the vast greenery, it houses members of the dynasty.

The town is known for the Panchaligeshwara Temple. Vitla is surrounded by a dense forest called Kalenjimale. It is believed that Bakasura lived in this forest during the Mahabharata period. A cave still exists in the forest which is supposed to have been the demon's resting ground.

Vitla town is placed on a junction of four roads connecting Puttur, Kasaragod, Mangalore and Salethur. Alike educational institutions is situated six kilometers from the city. The institution is one of the oldest in India. Puttaparthi Sai Baba voluntary super specialty hospital is also located in Alike.

== History ==
History speaks of the Vittal king Achuta Heggade who was overhauled by Hyder Ali. The former was supported by the British and was residing in Talacheri.

Achuta would visit Vittal occasionally to regroup his men and fight Hyder Ali. For this, he had to lose his life. Hyder Ali had him hanged to death. His palace in Vittal is on a 10-acre (4.0 ha) land with a large magnificent stone-carved door. The ancient foundation has round towers and even had a stable.

Ravivarma Narasimha Domba Heggade, the successor of Achuta Heggade kindled the sparks for the first revolt against the British who were ruling coastal Karnataka after the death of Tipu. But Domba Heggade was hanged by the British.

The foreigners took possession of all that Vittal Heggade owned, except the personal property and wealth. In return, the Englishmen paid an annual royalty.

The descendants of the royal family still live in the palace. In 1783, the family went on a pilgrimage to Kashi and in memory of it set up a Kashi Math.

Ravivarma Narasimha Domba Heggade built a new palace within the premises of the old one between 1790 and 1800. He along with his son-in-law won back the Vittal kingdom and ruled to the end of his life.

== Geography ==
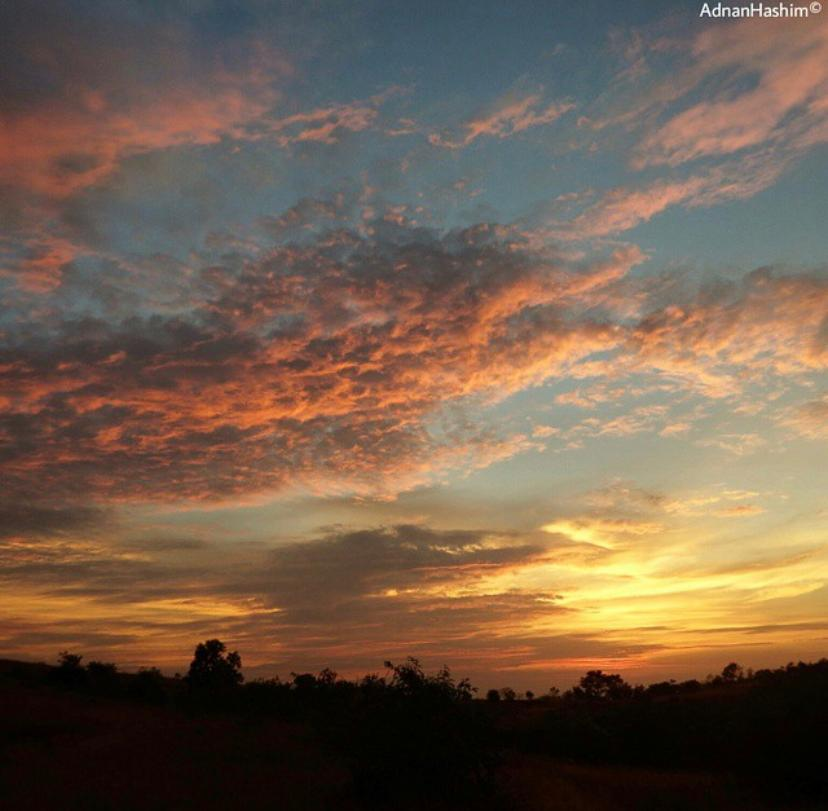
Sun setting via Kulal road in Kudthamuger, popularly known as Golf

The soil is very fertile as Vitla is located on the foothills of Western Ghats, and rivers flow carrying along the rich minerals from the inland, thus making it a perfect place for agriculture. The town is one of the richest areca-growing areas in the country. Vitla is surrounded by hills covered in native vegetation, rocks & hills, the geography also includes flat lands used for agriculture of Areca, rubber, coconut & rice fields. The prominent hills are found via Mangaluru road in a place called Kelinja and Kodapadav. Kalenjimale Forest is spread across the region from Vitla Town to Kanyana & from Ukkuda to Salethur. There is a river beside Kalenjimale that finally flows into the Arabian Sea, the river is seasonal, will be dry during the summer and will be overflowing during peak monsoon season. The best of views of Kalenjimale can be found on the left side beside Vitla-Salethur road. And there are few flat lands between the forests which has the clearest of night skies in Bantwal Taluk, it can be best visible after pre-monsoon showers when the air is clean and fresh. On a clear day, the Kundremukh peak can also be visible from the hills of Kanyana.

=== Flora and fauna ===
The place is surrounded by Kalenjimale forest with an abundant supply of water from the rivers, which makes it a breeding ground for life with rich flora and fauna surrounding the town. Agriculture plays a prominent role in the life of the people living in Vitla, thus the area is surrounded by vast Areca plantations, making it a perfect habitat for various fauna life to flourish. Even though the population has been increasing, the forests and natural habitats are intact due to the strict government rule against deforestation. The wild animals found include Indian wild Dog (Dhole), Wroughton's, Wild Boar, Bonnet macaque, Indian rock python, Russell's viper, Asian palm civet, Bengal fox and few others. The Kalenjimale forest is known for Sandalwood plantations, which are presently growing and are protected by the Karnataka Forest Department. The flora found is very diverse and rich, the notable trees are Indian Mahogany, Polyalthia longifolia, Banyan Tree, Sandlewood tree, Ficus religiosa & many more.

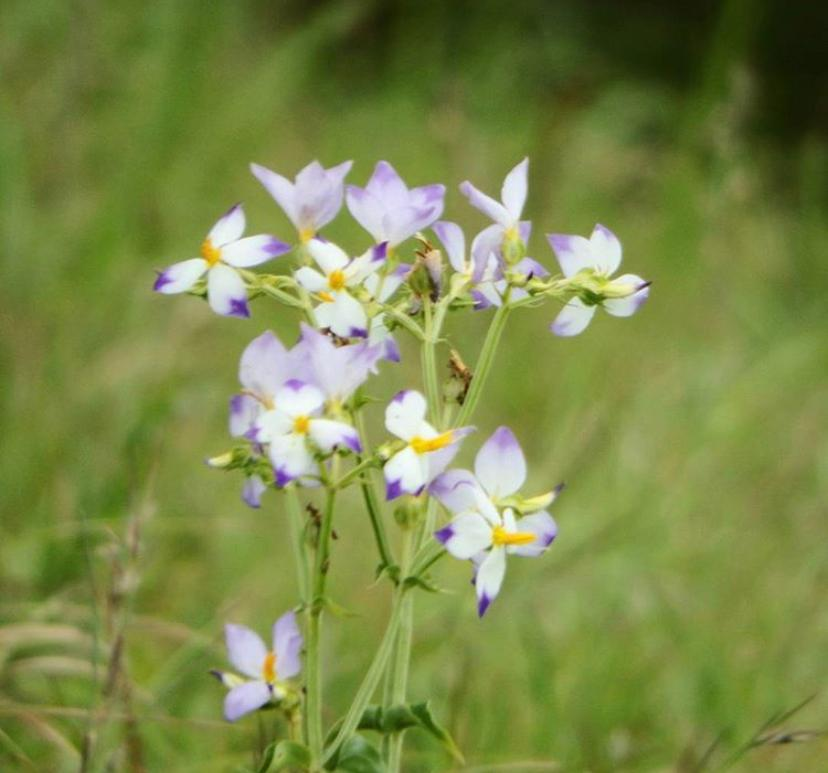
Cuckoo Flower found in upper parts of Kalenjimale

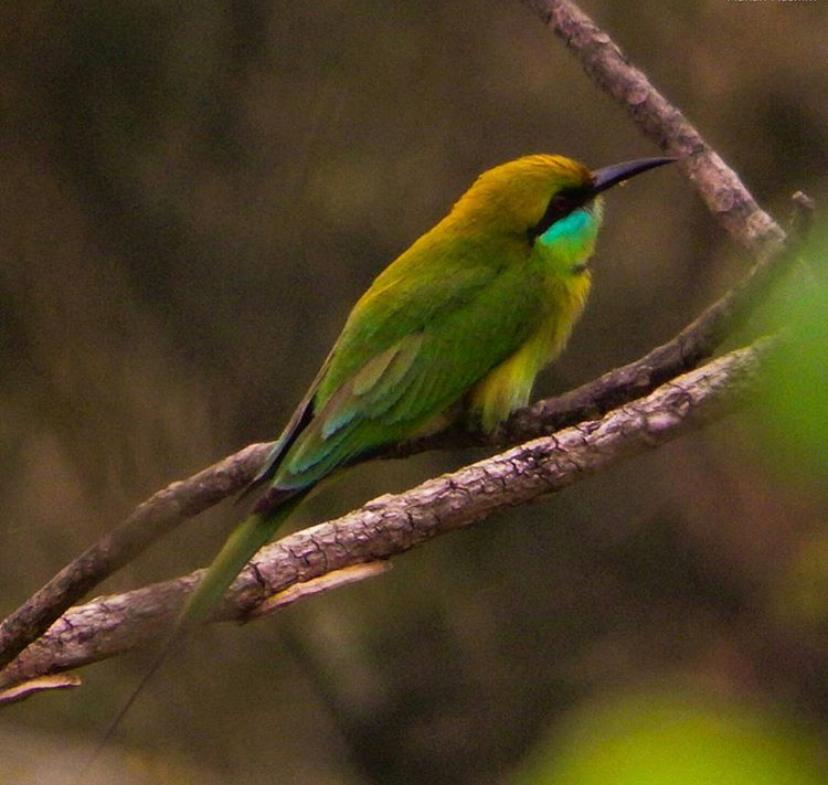
A Green Bee-Eater found in the Kalenjimale

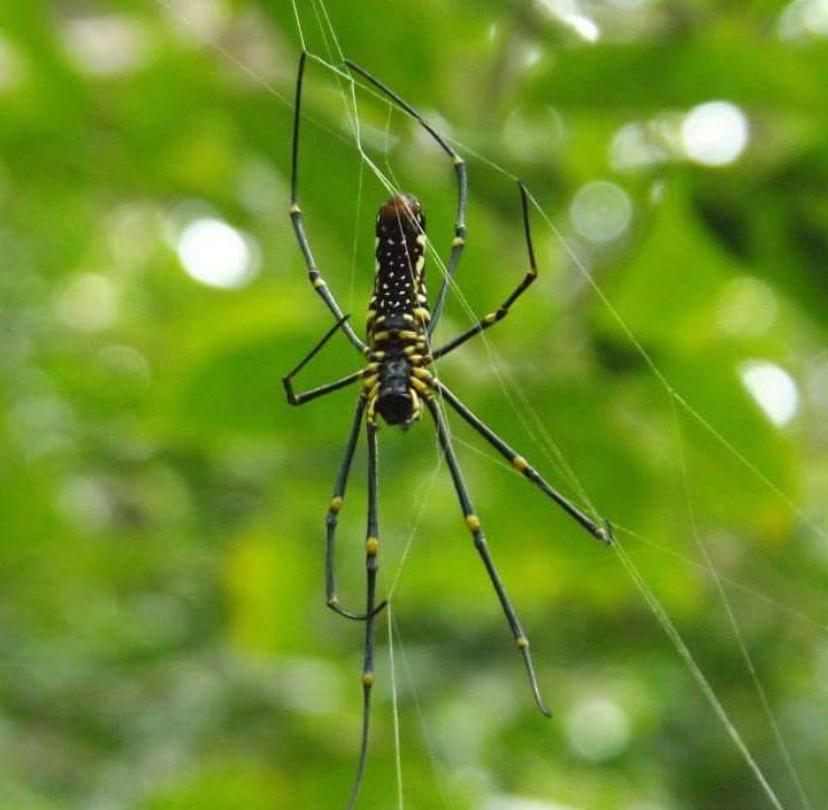
Northern Golden Orb Weaver Nephila pilipes found in Kalenjimale

=== Kalenjimale ===
Adjacent to the town, there is a coastal moist forest known as Kalenjimale. This forest has prominence in ancient Hindu mythology. The forest stretches from Ukkuda to Anekallu, covered in the dense canopy and few flatlands in the center & top. There are roads leading into the heart of the forest used by the forest officials, but these roads not accessible as it used rarely. The river flows beside the forest, thus keeping the nutrient cycle going. The forest is accessible with various roads connecting towns nearby. Since the forest status is reserved and protected under law, this pristine wilderness is still intact. Even though the trees are cut down and replaced by Earleaf Acacia, Acacia auriculiformis, lot of work is being done on reversing the damage done to this ecosystem. The diverse bird activities during the seasons attract photographers and nature enthusiasts.

== Agriculture ==
Agriculture plays a major role in the life and economy of Vitla, the prominent crops grown here are Arecanut, Paddy, cocoa, Cashew, Coconut, pepper & Rubber. It is normal to see cattle in most of the houses who grow crops. Cow, goats, rooster & hens are domesticated. Even though cock fighting is prohibited, during certain ceremony in the temple, it is allowed under prior permission. Abundant water from rain & ground, fertile soil & climate is responsible for agriculture to thrive here.

== Climate ==
As this place is in between the coast and the Western ghats, this place is known to humid summer and heavy rainfalls, the temperature varies from 21 degree Celsius to 33 degrees Celsius. The summer starts from mid of February and lasts until June. Pre-monsoon showers or mango showers are seen from mid-May, and the rainy season usually lasts until September. The area revives an average annual rainfall of 500mm. From November to February is the winter, when temperatures are usually between 21 and 26 degrees Celsius.

Climate data for Vittla, India
Month	Jan	Feb	Mar	Apr	May	Jun	Jul	Aug	Sep	Oct	Nov	Dec	Year
Mean daily maximum °C (°F)	31.4 (88.5)	31.7 (89.1)	32.5 (90.5)	33.0 (91.4)	32.3 (90.1)	29.4 (84.9)	28.1 (82.6)	28.3 (82.9)	28.9 (84.0)	30.0 (86.0)	30.9 (87.6)	31.4 (88.5)	30.7 (87.2)
Daily mean °C (°F)	26.3 (79.3)	27.0 (80.6)	28.2 (82.8)	29.3 (84.7)	28.8 (83.8)	26.5 (79.7)	25.6 (78.1)	25.8 (78.4)	26.0 (78.8)	26.7 (80.1)	26.7 (80.1)	26.3 (79.3)	26.9 (80.4)
Mean daily minimum °C (°F)	21.2 (70.2)	22.3 (72.1)	23.9 (75.0)	25.6 (78.1)	25.4 (77.7)	23.7 (74.7)	23.2 (73.8)	23.3 (73.9)	23.2 (73.8)	23.4 (74.1)	22.6 (72.7)	21.3 (70.3)	21.2 (70.2)
Average rainfall mm (inches)	0 (0)	1 (0.0)	5 (0.2)	55 (2.2)	209 (8.2)	951 (37.4)	1,386 (54.6)	796 (31.3)	371 (14.6)	256 (10.1)	79 (3.1)	21 (0.8)	4,130 (162.5)
Source: Climate-Data.org - Climate Table of Vitla, Karnataka, India

== Education ==
Some of schools and colleges in and around Vitla.

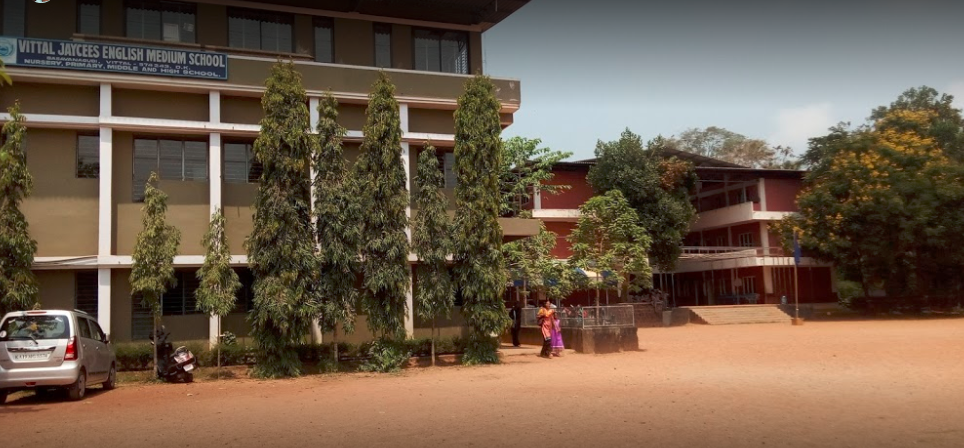
Vittal Jaycees English Medium School

- Govt Model Higher Primary School, Vittal-574243
- Vittal Pre-University College-574243
- Vittal Girls' High School, Vittal-574243
- Vittal Jaycees English Medium School, Basavanagudi, Vitla-574243
- St. Rita English Medium & Aided School Church Road, Vittal-574243
- Horizon Public School Meginapete Vittal-574243
- Sri Sathya Sai Primary School-Vidya Kuteera Alike-574235
- Sri Sathya Sai Loka Seva High School-Bala Kuteera Alike-574235
- Sri Sathya Sai Loka Seva Vidya Kendra Alike-574235
- Sri Sathya Sai Loka Seva PU College-Sathya Sai Vihara Alike-574235
- Govt. Pre-University College Kanyana-574279
- Sri Devi High School Punacha – 574243
- Sri Rama High School Kalladka-574222
- Sri Krishna Vidyodhaya Higher Primary School – Kanathadka
- Govt Arts and Commerce degree college, Vittal-574243
- Ukkuda Public School, Ukkuda, Vitla-574243

== Demographics & People of Vitla ==
Religions in Vitla as of 2011
source: [Census 2011]
1. Hindus (63.7%)
2. Muslim (31.5%)
3. Christians (4.70%)
4. Other (0.08%)

According to the 2011 census report, Hindus form the largest religious group in Vittla (11220 that is 63.69% of the town population). The number of Muslims is 5555 (31.53% of the taluk population) and the number of Christians in the taluk is 828 (4.70%)

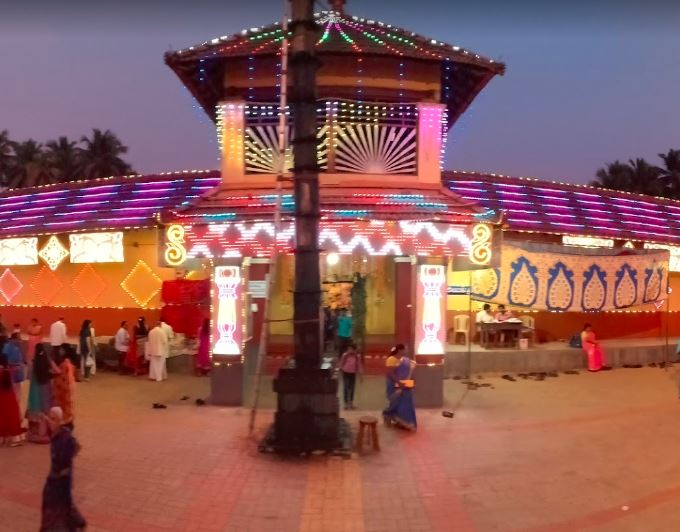
Vitla Shri Panchalingeshwara Temple

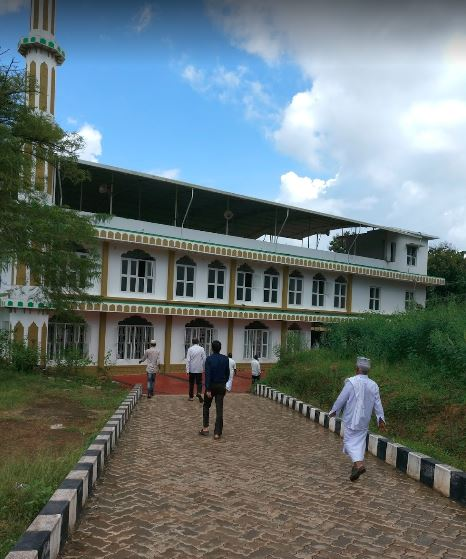
Mohiyuddin Juma Masjid Vitla

== Transportation ==
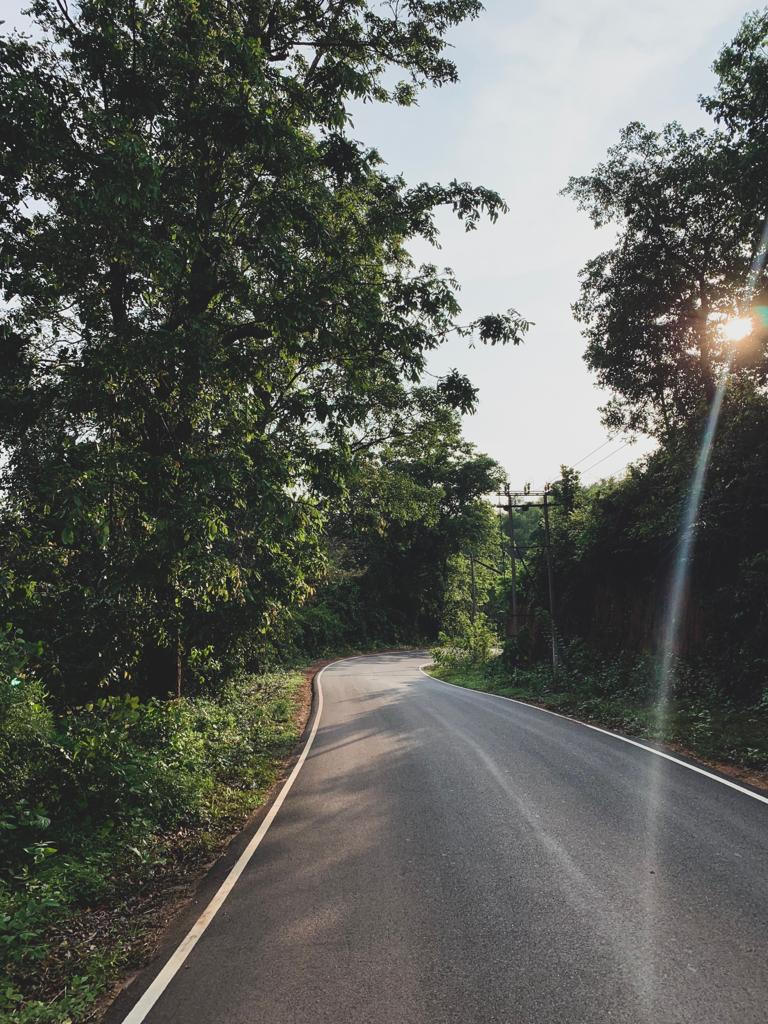
Road connecting from Vitla to Kanyana

There is a separate KSRTC bus stand and private bus stand. Vittal is directly connected through bus to Manglore, Puttur, Kasargod, Manjeshwar, Uppala, Hosangady, Salethur, B C Road, Kalladka, Kabaka, Kanyana, Mittanadka, Padyana, Perla, Badiadka, Panaje, Odiyoor, Anekal, Mudipu, Thokkotu, Derlakatte, Adyanadka, Saradka, Boluvar and many other small places. It is the biggest town in Bantwal Taluk, next to Kalladka. And MALABAR buses go through the city Vittal towards Kasaragod to Puttur.

== Landmarks ==
The institutions of Sri Satya Sai Baba such as SSSLSVK, PU college and Balakuteera are located in Alike, around 7 km from Vittal. There is a KSRTC Rajahamsa bus from Alike to Bangalore via Vittal. Central Plantation Corps Research Institute (CPCRI) Regional Station is located in Vittal-Puttur Road around 3 km from Vittal Bus Stand

=== Panchalingeshwara temple ===
Vitla is known for its Panchalingeshwara temple. Hidden from the public glare so far, the temple had a limited patronage from both the government and the devotees, but its glorious past relates to the Mahabharata.

It is said the five Shiva Lingams at the temple were consecrated by the Pandavas. The undated shilashasanas (rock inscriptions) found on the premises of the temple bear testimony to this. An inscription of 1894 speaks about the pension paid to the hereditary trustees belonging to "Doddamarasugalu" by the government. The Pancha Lingams are different in size resembling the Pandavas' physic. The three-storey temple is similar in structure to those built in Madhur (Ganapathy), Adoor, Kavu and Kaniyaru. They all belonged to the Mayippady royal family of Kumble (which is now in Kasaragod district of Kerala). The sthalapurana says that it belonged to the time of the Pandavas or even earlier as the Pandavas had only performed "prathisthe" of the Pancha Lingams during their "Agnatavasa".

To support the sthalapurana, the geographical features mentioned in the "Upa Katha" of "Bakasura Vadhe" in the Aranya Kanda of the Mahabharata can be seen on the periphery of the temple. The "Gami" where Bakasura lived is on a hillock close to the town. People still visit the place where Bhima vanquished Bakasura. There are three other places, Netthare Kere (puddle of blood), "Chipparu" where Bakasura's head was found and "Kayyaru" where the hands of the demon were found.

=== Kotikere ===
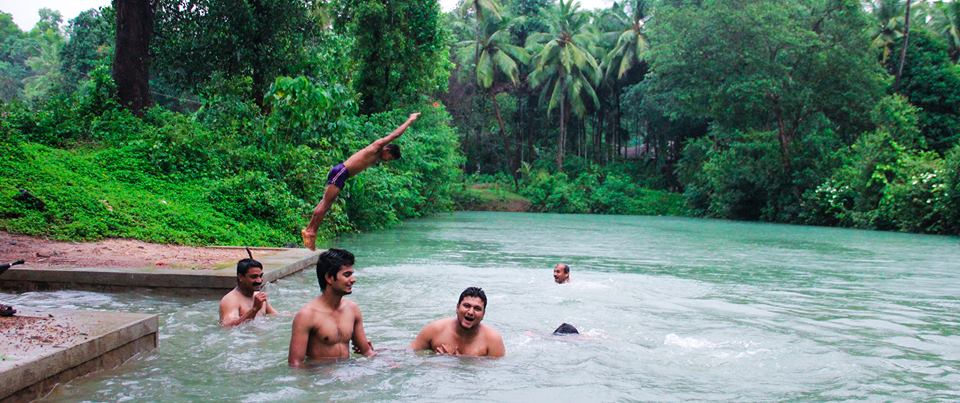
People swimming in Kotikere

Kotikere is swimming pool, which was built and used by the royal family of Vitla which is now used by the public. Swimming training and competitions are conducted here. The spring water from the quarry and other sources fill the pool and water overflows most of the time, thus the pool is maintained clean naturally.

=== Vitla Palace ===
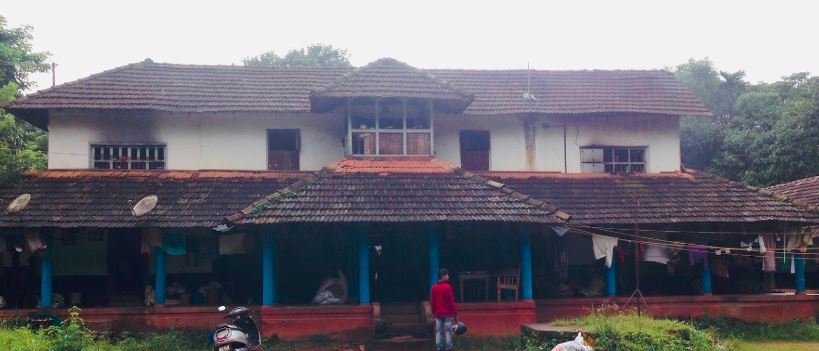
Vitla Palace

The palace was built in 1800 to replace the previous palace that was burnt down. It contains 30 rooms an houses around 60 people who are descendants of the Heggade dynasty of Vitla. It contains storage rooms for areca nuts and rice. It also has an ornamental lampstand, containing an inscription detailing the rituals that are to be performed in Diwali, the inscription is in the Kodava language, written in the Tigalari script. The palace today is in a state of decay, requiring considerable renovation if this heritage building is not to be lost.
