= Bantwal taluk =

Bantwal
- Taluka
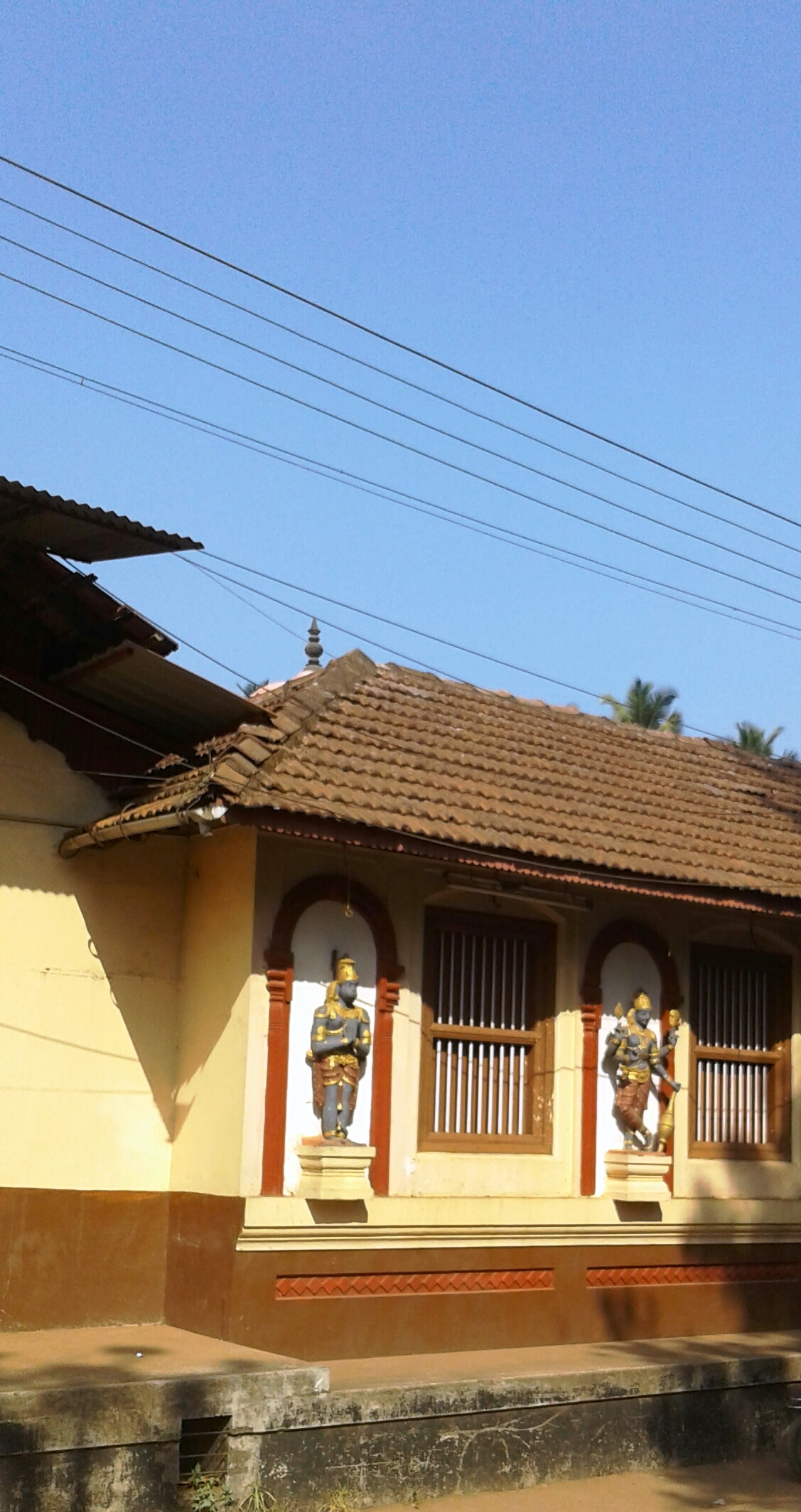
- Kashi Mutt in Bantwal

- Location in Karnataka, India
- Coordinates: 12.8936°N 74.9947°E
- Country: India
- State: Karnataka
- District: Dakshina Kannada
- Nearest City: Mangalore

Area
  - Total: 740 km^{2} (290 sq mi)
- Elevation: 36 m (118 ft)

Population (2011)
  - Total: 395,380
  - Density: 530/km^{2} (1,400/sq mi)

Languages
  - Official: Kannada
- Time zone: UTC+5:30 (IST)
- PIN: 574 211
- Telephone code: 08255
- Vehicle registration: KA-70
- Website: www.bantwaltown.mrc.gov.in

Bantwal taluk is a taluk of Dakshina Kannada district. The headquarters is the town of Bantwal, an eastern suburb of Mangalore.

Prior to 1852, Bantwal Taluk was the largest taluk in the entire of Canara Province (then comprising North Canara, Udupi, Mangalore and Kasaragod Districts) with 411 villages and a total population of 1,69,416. In 1852, a portion of it was formed into the Taluk of Puttur. Bantwal was an entrepot for the produce of the province on its way to the Mysore Country and had derived a great benefit of late years from the extension of the coffee trade. It contained about thousand scattered houses inhabited by Billava, Bunts, Bhandary, Ganigas, Kulals, Goud Saraswat Brahmins, Konkani Catholics and a few Jains.

== Geography ==
Bantwal is located along the coast of river Netravathi. Every year due to heavy rains the river floods. The taluk is flanked by the state of Kerala in the south, and the towns of Belthangady and Puttur in the east, the city of Mangalore in the west and Karkala in the north. It covers an area of about 720 square kilometres. National Highway 73 cuts through B. C. Road. The highway serves as the conduit for several arterial routes leading to neighbouring towns with Mangalore. Mangalore is connected with other cities in Karnataka such as Mysore and Bangalore by National Highway 275 (India) and National Highway 75 (India) respectively. It is well connected to Uppala through Uppala-Mudipu-Bantwal Highway.

The Grama Panchayats in Bantwal taluk are Golthamajalu, Kolnadu, Sajipa Muda, Kurnadu, Maani, Navooru, Pudu, Sangabettu, Amtady, Maavinakatte, Sarapady, Thumbe, Veerakumba and Vittla (Vittal).

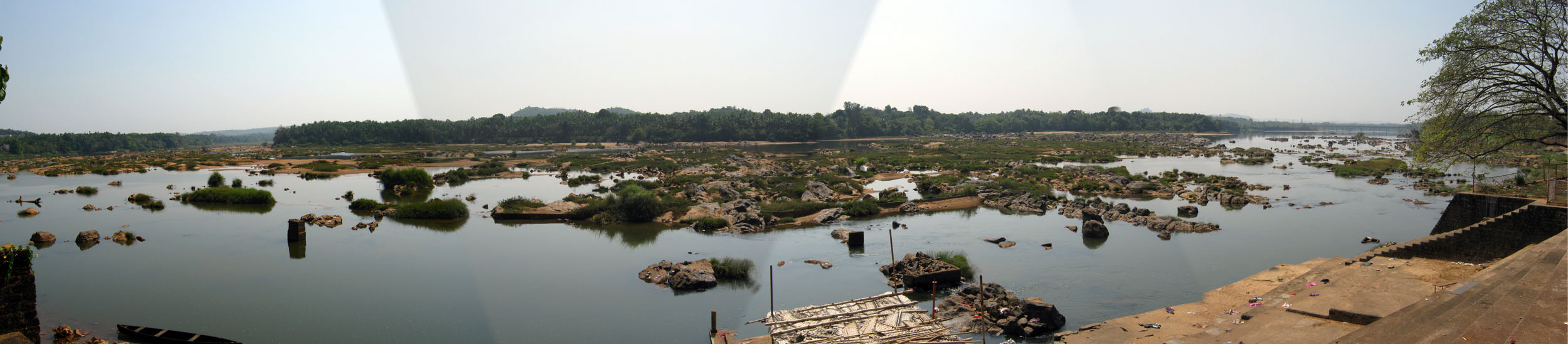
Nethravathi River flowing near Sri Thirumala Venkataramana Swamy Temple, Bantwal

The Netravati River passes through the taluka. Water supply to Mangalore city is provided by a vented dam at Thumbe to Netravathi. There is a bridge over the Netravati river at Panemangalore.

Some other places in Bantwal taluk of interest are Kadeshivalaya, Ajilamogaru, Alike, Karanje, Naraharibetta, Nandavara, Modankap, Agrar and Loretto.

== Demographics ==
Religions in Bantwal taluk (2011)
Religion	Percent
Hinduism	61.27%
Islam	32.47%
Christianity	5.95%
Other or not stated	0.31%

At the time of the 2011 census of India, Bantwal taluk had 76,405 households and a population of 395,380. The taluka had a sex ratio of 1010 females per 1000 males and a literacy rate of 77.58%. 41,635 (10.53%) of the population was under 6 years of age. 115,898 (29.31%) lived in urban areas. Scheduled Castes and Scheduled Tribes made up 4.87% and 5.29% of the population respectively.

Languages of Bantwal taluk (2011)
1. Tulu (51.4%)
2. Beary (23.8%)
3. Malayalam (9.89%)
4. Konkani (8.15%)
5. Kannada (4.64%)
6. Others (2.17%)

At the time of the 2011 census, 51.36% of the population spoke Tulu, 9.89% Malayalam, 8.15% Konkani and 4.64% Kannada as their first language. 23.79% of the population spoke a language recorded as 'Others' on the census, i.e. Beary.
