= Vittalpadanur =

- village
- Location in Karnataka, India Vittalpadanur (India)
- Coordinates: 12.9°N 75.03°E
- Country: India
- State: Karnataka
- District: Dakshina Kannada
- Talukas: Bantwal

Government
  - Body: Gram panchayat

Population (2001)
  - Total: 6,221

Languages
  - Official: Kannada
- Time zone: UTC+5:30 (IST)
- ISO 3166 code: IN-KA
- Vehicle registration: KA
- Nearest city: Mangalore
- Website: karnataka.gov.in

Vittalpadanur is a village in the southern state of Karnataka, India. It is located in the Bantwal taluk of Dakshina Kannada district.

== Demographics ==
As of 2001 India census, Vittalpadanur had a population of 6221 with 3070 males and 3151 females.

== See also ==
- Dakshina Kannada
- Districts of Karnataka
