= Ira, Dakshina Kannada =

Ira, Dakshina Kannada Ira
- village
- Location in Karnataka, India Ira, Dakshina Kannada (India)
- Coordinates: 12.85698°N 74.98570°E
- Country: India
- State: Karnataka
- District: Dakshina Kannada
- Talukas: Bantwal

Population (2001)
  - Total: 6,502

Languages
  - Official: Kannada
- Time zone: UTC+5:30 (IST)

Ira is a village in the southern state of Karnataka, India. It is located in the Bantwal taluk of Dakshina Kannada district in Karnataka. Ira is situated at a distance of 30 km from Mangalore city. Ira is a showcase gram panchayat known for its cleanliness, sanitation and development projects. KIADB is planning a 700 acres (2.8 km^{2}) small scale industrial park in Ira. This includes a Textile Park of 300 acres (1.2 km^{2}).

== Demographics ==
As of 2001 India census, Ira had a population of 6502 with 3199 males and 3303 females.

== See also ==
- Dakshina Kannada
- Districts of Karnataka
