= Majali, Karnataka =

Majali
- town
- Location in Karnataka, India Majali (India)
- Coordinates: 14°54′N 74°06′E
- Country: India
- State: Karnataka

Languages
  - Official: Kannada
- Time zone: UTC+5:30 (IST)

Majali is a hamlet in the Uttar Kannada district of Karnataka, India. It is situated in a coastal region called Kanara at the Goa-Karnataka border. The language spoken there are Konkani and Kannada.

The village is a tourist destination for the beaches of Karwar, including Tilmati Beach (also known as "black sand beach.") Local cuisine includes fish curry and fried fish rice. Majali also known as fishing village providing a constant fish supply to the southern part Goa as well as to the neighbouring districts.

== Traditions ==
The village contains many temples, including the Ramnath, Devati, Kashipurush, Betal, Shanteri and Daad Temples. Every November, a major festival known as Karthik Punav is celebrated at Ramnath temple during Karthika Masa. This festival is a Ratha-Yatra which begins in Mahadev Temple (Van) in Majali and ends in Ramnath Temple at Gaongeri (Majali). Another festival celebrated is Markepunav, which takes place annually in the month of February during Margasira Masa. This festival is also a Ratha-Yatra which is a to and fro yatra between Devati temple and Daad temple.

== Education and research ==
=== University education ===
Government Engineering College is an Engineering college in Majali, Karwar, Uttara Kannada district of Karnataka, India. Situated 6 mile away from Karwar. The college is affiliated to Visvesvaraya Technological University, Belgaum

Girijabai Sail Institute of Technology is an engineering college in Majali, Karwar, Uttara Kannada district of Karnataka, India, situated approximately 12 km from Karwar in the surroundings of Majali. The college is affiliated to Visvesvaraya Technological University, Belgaum

== Notable people ==
- Mahabaleshwar Sail, Konkani writer, whose novel Hawthan, is based on the potters' colony in Majali.

== See also ==
- Sadishivgarh
- Karwar
- Ankola
- Kumta
- Honavar
