= Dot Times =

Indian digital news publication

- Cover dated 8 March 2026
- Type: Online newspaper
- Format: Digital
- Founded: 2021
- Language: English, Hindi
- Country: India
- Website: dottimes.in

Dot Times is an Indian weekly newspaper and digital news publication established on 16 January 2021. It is published in English and Hindi.

== History ==
Dot Times was founded in 2021, and its first online issue was published on 16 January 2021. In October 2026, the publication introduced a dedicated section for news from Mangaluru and the coastal Karnataka region.

== Publications ==
- Bhagwan Koi Abhinay Nahi – a Hindi poem addressing faith, devotion and religious presentations.
