= Mithur =

Mithur Idkidu
- village
- Location in Karnataka, India Mithur (India)
- Coordinates: 12.795°N 75.149°E
- Country: India
- State: Karnataka
- District: Dakshina Kannada

Population (2011)
  - Total: 3,776

Languages
  - Official: Kannada
- Time zone: UTC+5:30 (IST)
- PIN: 574 220
- Vehicle registration: KA-19

Mithur (Idkidu) is a village in Bantwal Taluk, in the Dakshina Kannada district of Karnataka, India. Many Hindus and Muslims live here. The Mangalore-Puttur highway passes through the village.
