= Mahabaleshwar Sail =

Indian author (born 1943)

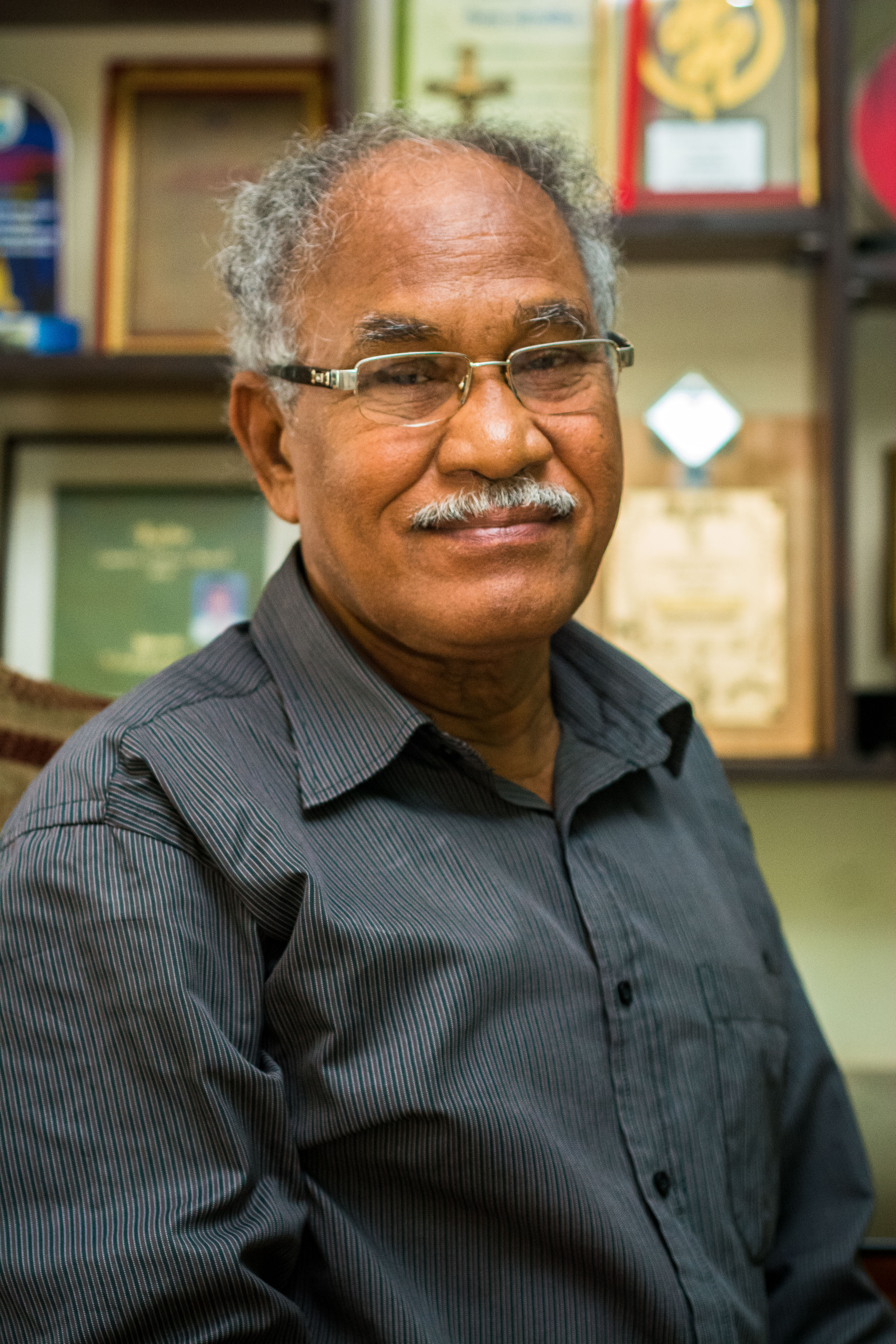
- Born: Mahabaleshwar Datta Sail; 4 August 1943 (age 83); Shejebag, Majali, Karnataka, India
- Occupation: Writer
- Writing career
- Language: Konkani language, Marathi language, Kannada language

Mahabaleshwar Datta Sail (born 4 August 1943) is an Indian author. He has been honoured with the Saraswati Samman, 2016 for his novel 'Hawthan' (हावटण).

== Life ==
Mahabaleshwar Sail was born on 4 August 1943 in Shejebag, Majali, Karnataka village of Uttara Kannada district of Karnataka. He was born in a family of agriculturalists. Sail's father was in the Army. Due to his father's demise, Sail had to leave schooling during his childhood and engage in agriculture. He started school at the age of six and dropped out in the eighth standard. Subsequently, he enrolled himself in the Indian Army. Sail also participated in the Indo-Pakistani War of 1965 and was stationed at the Hussainiwala border.

He also served as a United Nations peacekeeper between 1964–1965 at the border between Israel and Egypt. Sail has worked as a supervisor in the Forest Department. He was also in the Goa, Daman and Diu Police. Sail worked in India Post till his retirement.

== Literature ==
Sail initially wrote in Marathi language but later started writing in Konkani language too. His first story appeared in Pralhad Keshav Atre's Sāptāhik Navyug weekly. The first story which he wrote was during a lull in the battle after the Tashkent Declaration.

Sail has written stories, novels and children's literature in Konkani language. He has authored novels, stories and plays in Marathi language. His first Konkani novel was Kaali Ganga (काळी गंगा) in 1996. It dealt with the lives of the farming communities on the banks of the Kali River (Karnataka) in Karwar. Sail received the Sahitya Akadami Award in Konkani language for his short story collection Taranga(तरंगा) in 1993.

He has authored two novellas, Adrusht(अदृष्ट) and Aranyakand(अरण्यकांड) in Konkani language. Adrusht(अदृष्ट) was adapted in the form of the critically acclaimed Konkani language film Paltadacho Munis.

Sail's Konkani shorty story collections are Padtadche Taru(पलतडचे तारू), 'Taranga(तरंगा), Baynet Fighting(बायनेट फायटिंग), Nimano Ashwathama(निमाणो अश्वत्थामा) and Don Moolanche Zhaad(दोन मुळांचें झाड). His novels in Konkani language are 'Kaali Ganga(काळी गंगा), Adrusht(अदृष्ट), Aranyakand(अरण्यकांड), Yug Sanvar(युगसांवार), Khol Khol Moolam(खोल खोल मुळा), Vikhar Vilkho(विखार विळखो) and Maati and Malab(माती आनी मळब).

He has to his credit a children's novel named Saim Dev(सैम देव). His novels in Marathi language are Taandav(तांडव) and Band Darvaja(बंद दरवाजा). Sail has also scripted plays in Marathi language such as Nako Jalu Maza Gharta(नको जाळू माझं घरटं), Charitryaheen(चारित्र्याहीन), Sharanaagati(शरणागती) and Yaatna Chakra(यातना चक्र).

== Critical reception ==
Sail's writing is characterised by research on the topic and the use of Konkani language words from Karwar region. His novels are characterized by the use of strong female heroines and an excellent depiction of the characters.

Sail's Yug Sanvar(युगसांवार) in Konkani language and Taandav(तांडव) in Marathi language are based on the Goa Inquisition. Both the novels were widely discussed and an English translation by Vidya Pai entitled Age of Frenzy was released by HarperCollins India.

His novel Vikhar Vilkho(विखार विळखो) is based on the issue of narcotics. Hawthan(हावटण) is based on the challenged faced by the traditional potters due to the diminishing demand for their wares. Sail's writing have been honoured with various awards including the prestigious Saraswati Samman, 2016.

== Awards and honours ==
- Sahitya Akademi Award, 1993
- Dr. T.M.A. Pai Award (1997)
- Goa Kala Academy Award (1989 and 1996)
- Cultural Award by the Government of Goa (2006)
- Katha Award (2007)
- Literary Award by the Government of Goa (2007)
- Vimla V. Pai Vishwa Konkani Sahitya Puraskar (2010)
- Saraswati Samman (2016)

In addition, Sail has been a member of various government and literary organisations like the Sahitya Akademi, Karnataka Konkani Sahitya Akademi and the Goa Kala Academy. He was the President of the All India Konkani Parishad in 2005.
