= Sunquerim, Karnataka =

Sunquerim is a town on the Canara coast, in Karnataka, India.
