= Ravivarma Narasimha Domba Heggade =

Raja of the principslity of Vitla, India

Ravivarma Narasimha Domba Heggade (died 1800) was the raja (sovereign) of Vitla principality who led a resistance against British colonisers in the erstwhile South Canara district of British India.

== Life and death ==
Ravivarma was born in a royal Bunt dynasty known as Domba Heggade who ruled the Vitla principality which roughly comprised the southern talukas of the present Dakshina Kannada, Karnataka, India. He succeeded his maternal uncle Achyuta Domba Heggade to the throne according to the matrilineal inheritance laws of the Bunt to which the dynasty belonged. Ravivarma succeeded the throne in turbulent times as Achuyta Heggade was beheaded by Hyder Ali, the Muslim Ruler of Mysore after being captured in a conquest campaign. The royal family had fled to Tellicherry in present-day Kerala during Hyder Ali's campaign and hence survived.

After a few years in exile, Ravivarma led a military campaign to reclaim his kingdom and was successful. He was helped by the Raja of Nileshwaram and the British. But later on, when the British tried to reduce the influence of the Domba Heggade dynasty, Ravivarma openly revolted against their presence in south Canara district along with the neighbouring Raja of Kumbla and Raja of Nileshwaram. The three principalities led a combined revolt against the British but were unsuccessful and defeated. Ravivarma was hanged along with 9 members of the Domba Heggade dynasty by the British after they gained complete control of the south Canara region on 22 August 1800.
