= Amtady =

- village
- Location in Karnataka, India Amtady (India)
- Coordinates: 12.9°N 75.03°E
- Country: India
- State: Karnataka
- District: Dakshina Kannada
- Talukas: Bantwal

Government
  - Type: Democracy
  - Body: Gram panchayat

Population (2001)
  - Total: 5,387

Languages
  - Official: Tulu, Kannada
- Time zone: UTC+5:30 (IST)
- Postal code: 574211
- ISO 3166 code: IN-KA
- Vehicle registration: KA
- Nearest city: Mangalore
- Website: karnataka.gov.in

Amtady is a village in the southern state of Karnataka, India. It is located in the Bantwal taluk of Dakshina Kannada district in Karnataka.

The people in the village are peace loving people .It has many famous religious places. There are Churches, Mosques and Temples. People here speak Tulu, Konkani and Beary language. People are mostly dependent on agriculture and animal husbandry. Paddy, Arecanut, Coconut are the main crops grown here.

== Demographics ==
As of 2001 India census, Amtady had a population of 5387 with 2547 males and 2840 females.

== Nearby villages ==
- Eliyanadu godu
- Kukkipady
- Rayee
- Arala
- Panjikal
- Kodi
- Koila
- Chennaithodi
- Ajjibettu
- Kudambettu
- Pilimogru

== Religious places ==
- Annappa Swamy Temple
- Badaje Guthu Bandaradha Mane
- Our Lady of Loretto Church, Loretto
- Church of St. John Marie Vianney, Bambil
- Mahamaya Temple
- Shri Durgaparameshwari Bhajana Mandir (Est. 1954)

== Education ==
- DKZP Govt. Higher Primary School, Kinnibettu
- DKZP Govt. Higher Primary School, Nalkemar
- Lotetto aided higher Primary School, Loretto
- Loretto English Medium High School, Loretto
- Loretto English Medium Lower Primary School, Loretto

== See also ==
- Dakshina Kannada
- Districts of Karnataka
