= Sarapady =

- village
- Location in Karnataka, India Sarapady (India)
- Coordinates: 12.857°N 75.137°E
- Country: India
- State: Karnataka
- District: Dakshina Kannada

Government
  - Body: Gram panchayat

Population (2011)
  - Total: 3,602

Languages
  - Official: Kannada
- Time zone: UTC+5:30 (IST)
- PIN: 574 264
- Telephone code: 08255
- ISO 3166 code: IN-KA
- Vehicle registration: KA-19
- Nearest city: Mangalore
- Website: karnataka.gov.in

Sarapady is a small village in Karnataka State, India on the banks of the Nethravathi river in the Bantwal taluk, Dakshina Kannada District.

There were plans of building a dam near it which necessitated the evacuation of the villagers from Sarapady, but the plans have been stalled. However a vented dam in Sarapady now helps MRPL pump water from Nethravathi.

== Temple ==
Sarabeshwara temple in Sarapady. And sadashiva temple in kadeshivalaya. .

== Church ==
St. john church in Allipade.

== Localities ==
- Odadadka

== Mosque ==
Ajilamogaru Mosque.

== Periyapade ==
Sri Dugalaya, Kodamanithaya daivastana in periyapade.
