= Girijabai Sail Institute of Technology =

Engineering college in Karnataka, India

- Majali
- Other names: GSIT
- Motto: Knowledge Exists To Be Imparted
- Type: Non-Autonomous
- Academic affiliations: VTU
- Chairman: Satish Sail (Ex MLA of Karwar-Ankola Constituency)
- Principal: Suresh D. Mane
- Location: Karwar, Karnataka, India
- Website: gsit.in

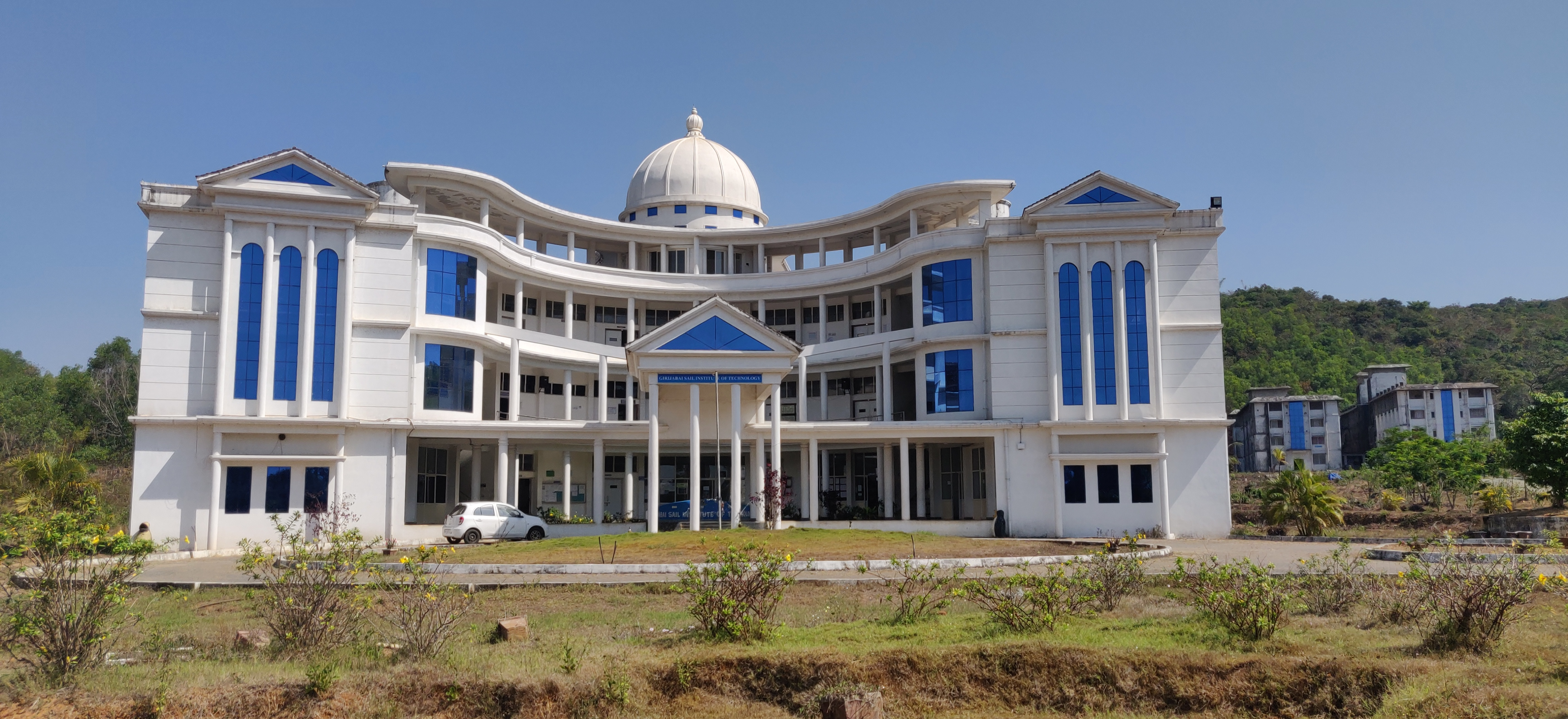
Girijabai Sail Institute of Technology

Girijabai Sail Institute of Technology (GSIT) is an engineering college in Uttara Kannada district of Karnataka, India situated approximately 12 km from Karwar in the surroundings of Majali. The college is affiliated to Visvesvaraya Technological University, Belgaum. It is also approved by All India Council for Technical Education AICTE, New Delhi. also in collaboration with The JGI Group

== Overview ==
Girijabai Sail Institute of Technology (GSIT) is the first major initiative of Girijabai Sail Memorial Trust (GSMT) towards its mission of higher education. The Trust aims at continuing such efforts and starting more career oriented courses and also to start education institutes at all levels.

Mr. Satish Sail (EX MLA of Karwar-Ankola Constituency) is the chairman of the GSIT. The college spreads over 20 acres in Majali and is accessible from Karwar and Goa. The college is equipped with Cafeteria, WI-Fi campus, Mess and Hostel facility along with College bus facility for Day Scholars.The college has taken bold initiatives and arranged for four campus drives for the first batch of engineering graduates passing out in 2016. 80% of the students in E&C as well as CS Engineering stream got placed in top companies.

The final year students have done excellent projects and 6 of them got sponsored by the Govt of Karnataka through Karnataka State Council for Science and Technology, Bangalore. The students presented their projects for review at an engineering college in Hubli in June 2016 which was appreciated by the reviewers.

Focus is given for internships and industrial visits which are being regularly arranged.

== Courses ==
Following are the courses in the college:

- B.E in Mechanical Engineering
- B.E in Computer Science and Engineering
- B.E in Civil
- Basic science

Diploma holders in the above Engineering streams can get Lateral Entry to Second Year of Engineering directly.
