= Indian mahogany =

Indian mahogany is the common name for two species of trees in the family Meliaceae:

- Toona ciliata, native to southern Asia to Australia; also known as toon, Australian red cedar, or Indian cedar
- Chukrasia velutina, native to southern Asia and Indochina; also known as bastard cedar, Chittagong wood, Burmese almondwood or Jamaica cedar

It may also refer to:

- Swietenia mahagoni, native to Florida to the Caribbean; a true mahogany also known as the West Indian mahogany or the West Indies mahogany
- Pterocarpus dalbergioides, endemic to India; also known as the East Indian mahogany, Andaman padauk, or Andaman redwood
