= Kanara =

Region in Karnataka, India

Kanara (Canara) Karavali
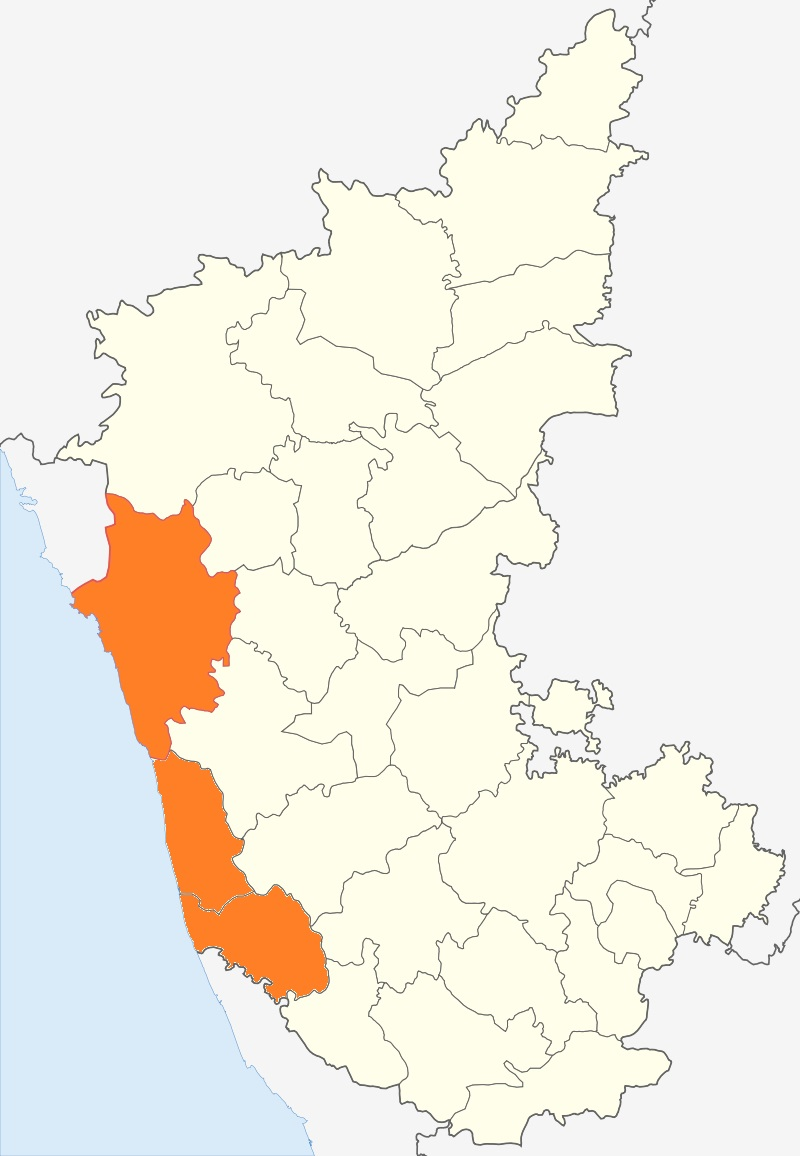
- Kanara (spotlighted in orange) occupies Karnataka's entire seaboard
- Interactive map of Kanara (Canara)
- Country: India
- State: Karnataka
- Largest city: Mangaluru
- Headquarters: Uttara Kannada: Karwar Udupi: Udupi Dakshina Kannada: Mangaluru
- Taluks: Uttara Kannada: Karwar, Ankola, Kumta, Honnavar, Bhatkal, Sirsi, Siddapur, Yellapur, Mundgod, Haliyal, Joida, Dandeli Udupi: Udupi, Karkala, Kundapur, Baindur, Brahmavar, Kaup, Hebri Dakshina Kannada: Mangaluru, Moodabidri, Bantwal, Belthangady, Sullia, Puttur, Kadaba

Area
  - Total: 18,730 km^{2} (7,230 sq mi)

Population (2011)
  - Total: 4,704,179
  - Density: 251.2/km^{2} (650.5/sq mi)

Languages
  - Official: Kannada
- Time zone: UTC+5:30 (IST)
- Vehicle registration: Sirsi KA–31; Karwar KA–30; Honnavar KA–47; Dandeli KA–65; Udupi KA–20; Mangaluru KA–19; Puttur KA–21; Surathkal KA–62; Bantwal KA–70
- Coastline: 320 km (200 mi)
- Sex ratio: 1,040 ♂/♀
- Literacy: ▲87.03% (Highest in Karnataka)

Kanara, also known as Canara and Karāvali, is the historically significant stretch of land situated by the southwestern coast of India, alongside the Arabian Sea in the present-day Indian state of Karnataka. The subregion comprises three civil districts, namely: Uttara Kannada, Udupi, and Dakshina Kannada. Kasaragod was included prior to the States Reorganisation Act.

== Etymology ==
According to historian Severino da Silva, the ancient name for this region is Parashurama Srushti (creation of Parashurama). According to him and Stephen Fuchs, the name Canara is the invention of Portuguese, Dutch, and English people who visited the area for trade from the early sixteenth century onwards. The Bednore Dynasty, under whose rule this tract was at that time, was known to them as the Kannada Dynasty, i.e., the dynasty speaking the Kannada language. "Karāvalli", the Kannada word for 'coast', is the term used by Kannada-speakers to refer to this region. The letter 'd' being always pronounced like 'r' by the Europeans, the district was named by them as 'Canara' (a corruption of the word "Kannada"). This name was retained by the British after their occupation of the district in 1799, and has remained ever since. However, they also say that this issue is controversial.

== History ==
Since antiquity, much of the Canara coast occupied a culturally distinct area known as Tulu Nadu. Historically, Tulu Nadu lay between the Gangavalli River in the north and the Chandragiri River in the south. Currently, Tulu Nadu consists of the Udupi and Dakshina Kannada districts of Karnataka, and the Manjeshwaram taluk of Kerala. The Uttara Kannada district in general is considered to be the southernmost part of the Konkan coast. Specifically, the littoral region north of the Gangavalli River is traditionally included in the Konkan.

The Portuguese occupied Kanara from 1498–1763. During this period, the geographical extent of Canara stretched from the southern banks of the Kali River in Karwar in the north to the northern banks of the Chandragiri River in Kasaragod in the south.

In 1799, after the conclusion of the Fourth Mysore War, the British took over the region and established the Canara district of the Madras Presidency. The district was bifurcated into the North and South Canara districts in 1859. The North Canara district was transferred to the Bombay Presidency whereas the South Canara district remained under the jurisdiction of the Madras Presidency. South Canara encompassed the undivided territory of the contemporary Udupi, Dakshina Kannada, and Kasaragod districts.

After India's independence in 1947, the Bombay Presidency was reconstituted as the Bombay State. Following the States Reorganisation Act, 1956, the southern portion of Bombay State was added to Mysore State, which was renamed Karnataka in 1972. Kasaragod was included in Kerala. Subsequently, North and South Canara were renamed Uttara Kannada and Dakshina Kannada respectively. In 1997, Udupi district was carved out of the bigger Dakshina Kannada district.

== Geography ==
The Kanara region forms the coast of Karnataka situated on the south-western portion of Peninsular India. Coastal Karnataka forms the northern segment of the Malabar coast. Kanara constitutes an area of about 10,000 square kilometres (4,000 square miles). It is bounded by Konkan to the north, the Western Ghats to the east, the Kerala Plains to the south, and the Arabian Sea to the west. It stretches from north to south for about 225 kilometres (140 miles) and has a maximum width of about 64 kilometres (40 miles) in the south.

== Civil administration ==
Contemporary Kanara extends from the village of Majali in the north to the village of Talapady in the south. The three districts in the region: Uttara Kannada, Udupi, and Dakshina Kannada have their capitals in Karwar, Udupi, and Mangalore respectively.

== Demographics ==
Religion in Kanara regions
1. Hinduism (76.5%)
2. Islam (16.4%)
3. Christianity (5.90%)
4. Others (1.19%)

The Kanara region has 3 districts: Uttara Kannada, Udupi, and Dakshina Kannada. The combined population of these districts, according to the 2011 Census is about 4,704,179.

=== Languages ===
Languages of Kanara
1. Kannada (31.7%)
2. Tulu (29.4%)
3. Konkani (13.0%)
4. Beary (7.64%)
5. Malayalam (4.96%)
6. Marathi (3.62%)
7. Others (9.64%)

The main languages that are closely associated with the Kanara region are Kannada, Konkani and Tulu.

== See also ==
- Fort Anjediva
- Konkan
  - Carwar, North Canara
- South Canara (erstwhile district)
- Sunquerim, Karnataka
- Tulunaad
  - Udupi, Udupi district
  - Mangaluru, Dakshina Kannada
  - Kasaragod, Kassergode district
- Hosdurg Fort

== Notes ==
^A Konkan is now held to include all the land which lies between the Western Ghats and the Indian Ocean, from the latitude of Daman on the north to that of Terekhol, on the Goa frontier, on the south. Although most sources generally assign Kanara (Karavali) to the Malabar Coast, some other sources consider it to be a subterritory of the Konkan Coast. Consequently, this segment is thought to overlap the Konkan and Malabar Coast continuum; and usually corresponds to the southernmost and northernmost stretches of these locales respectively.
