= Bantwal =

- Suburb
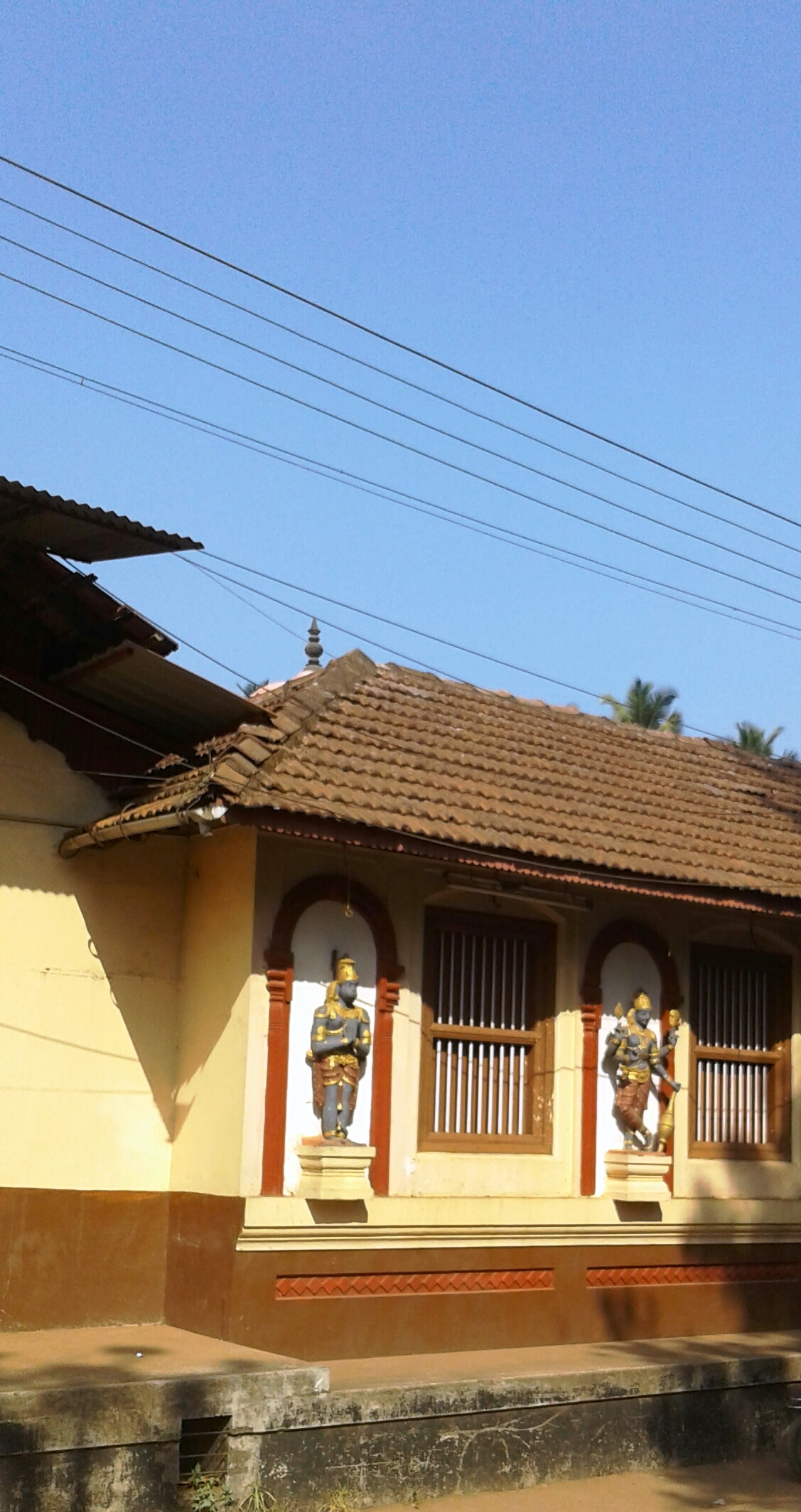
- Interactive map of Bantwal
- Coordinates: 12.8936°N 74.9947°E
- Country: India
- State: Karnataka
- District: Dakshina Kannada
- Nearest City: Mangalore

Area
  - Total: 25 km^{2} (9.7 sq mi)
- Elevation: 36 m (118 ft)

Population (2011)
  - Total: 40,155
  - Density: 1,473.2/km^{2} (3,816/sq mi)

Languages
  - Official: Kannada,Tulu
- Time zone: UTC+5:30 (IST)
- PIN: 574 211
- Telephone code: 08255
- Vehicle registration: KA-70
- Website: www.bantwaltown.mrc.gov.in

Bantwal is a city and taluk centre in Dakshina Kannada district, Karnataka, India, and the headquarters of Bantwal taluk. It is located 25 km (16 mi) East of Mangalore city center. BC Road-Kaikamba of Bantwal is one of the fastest developing areas in Dakshina Kannada district of Karnataka.

Along with BC Road-Kaikamba, Panemangalore & Melkar regions are also urbanized. They are also developing as the eastern suburbs of Mangalore. Towards east of Mangalore, the stretch to BC Road-Kaikamba region forms a continuous Mangalore Urban Agglomeration area which is currently the second biggest in Karnataka after Bangalore. Bantwal is the fourth largest urban area in Dakshina Kannada district after Mangalore, Ullal (both comes under Mangalore Urban Agglomeration area) & Puttur in terms of population.

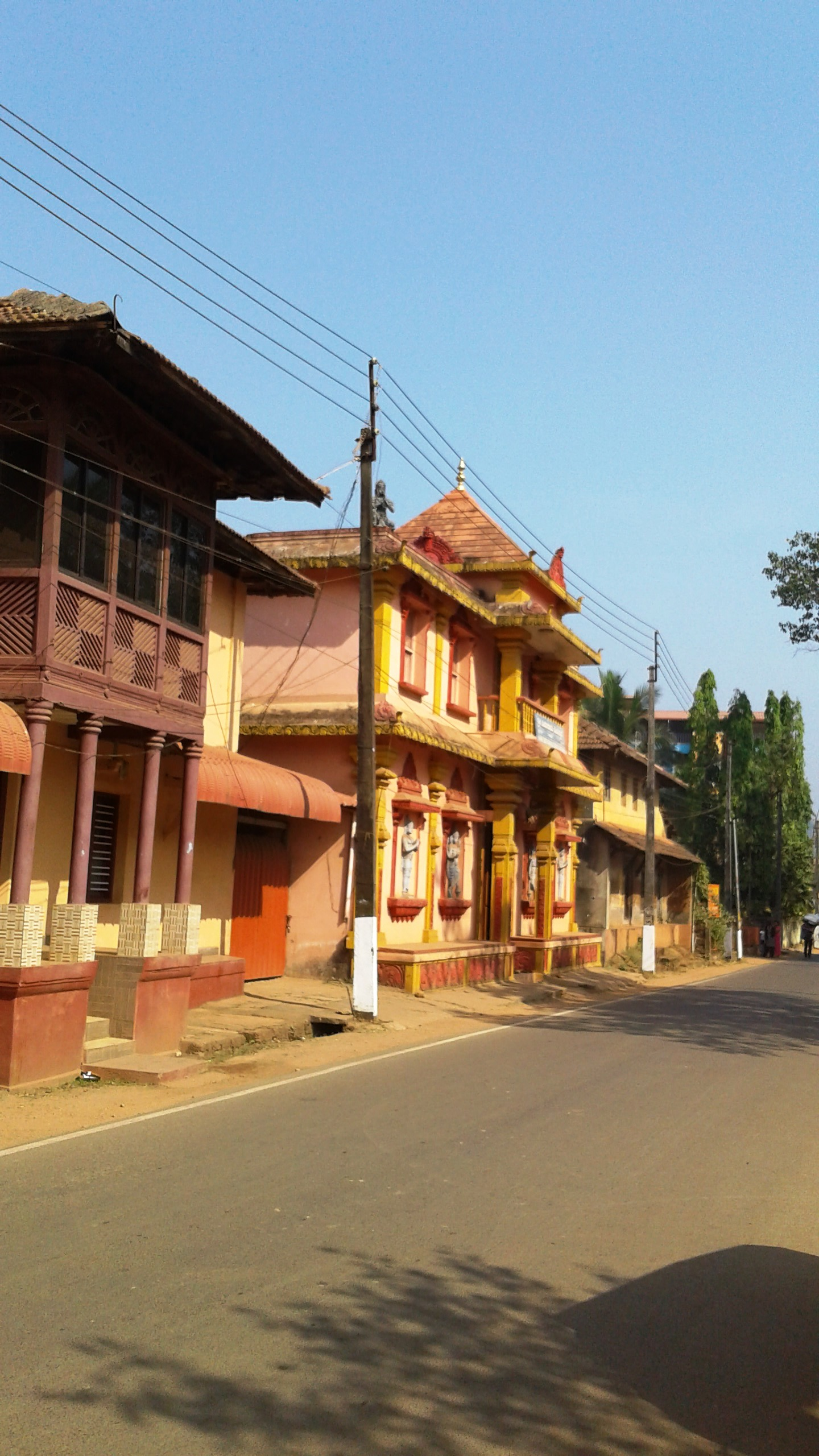
Srirama Sitadevi Temple

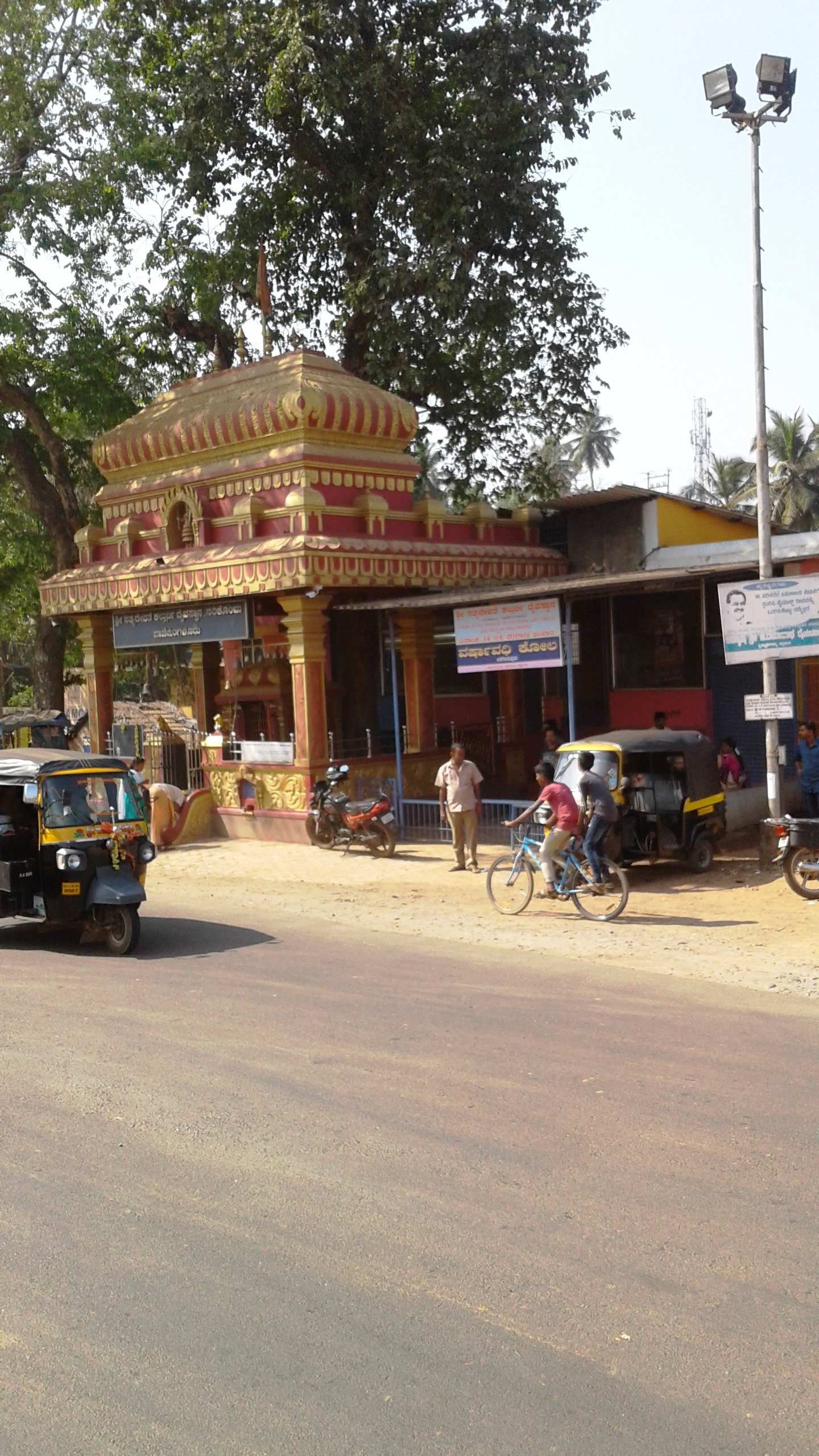
Panemangaluru Bypass Junction

== History ==
It is situated on the banks of River Nethravati on the National Highway 73 (India). The adjacent town of B.C. Road (Bantwal Cross Road) serves as the commercial center.

Previously, the town of Bantwal was known for trade with the Persian Gulf states, being so close to Mangalore. However, flooding caused by the river Netravathi during the monsoons compelled traders and newer settlements to move to the adjacent city of B.C. Road due to its higher altitude. Gradually, most Government offices shifted to B.C. Road.

Prior to 1852, Bantwal Taluk was the largest taluk in the entire of Canara Province (then comprising North Canara, Udupi, Mangalore and Kasaragod Districts) with 411 villages and a total population of 1,69,416. In 1852, a portion of it was formed into the Taluk of Puttur. Bantwal was an entrepot for the produce of the province on its way to the Mysore Country and had derived a great benefit of late years from the extension of the coffee trade. It contained about thousand scattered houses inhabited by Billava, Bunts, Bhandary, Ganigas, Kulals, Goud Saraswat Brahmins, Konkani Catholics and a few Jains.

== Geography ==
Bantwal is located along the coast of river Netravathi. Every year due to heavy rains the river floods. National Highway 73 cuts through B. C. Road. The highway serves as the conduit for several arterial routes leading to neighbouring towns with Mangalore. Mangalore is connected with other cities in Karnataka such as Mysore and Bangalore by National Highway 275 (India) and National Highway 75 (India) respectively. It is well connected to Uppala through Uppala-Mudipu-Bantwal Highway.

== Demographics ==
As of 2001 India census, Bantwal had a population of 36,829. Males constitute 50% of the population and females 50%. Bantwal has an average literacy rate of 74%, higher than the national average of 59.5%; with 76% of the males and 72% of females literate. 12% of the population is under 6 years of age. Tulu, Kannada, Beary and Konkani languages are spoken here.

According to the 2011 India census, Hindus make up 54.65% of total population, Muslims 38.42% and Christians 6.61% in Bantwal town.

== Politics ==
U Rajesh Naik (BJP) is the MLA from the Bantval (Karnataka Assembly constituency) since 2018.

== Economy ==
The town is still considered an important trade center for groceries, tobacco, hardware and gold.

== Transport ==
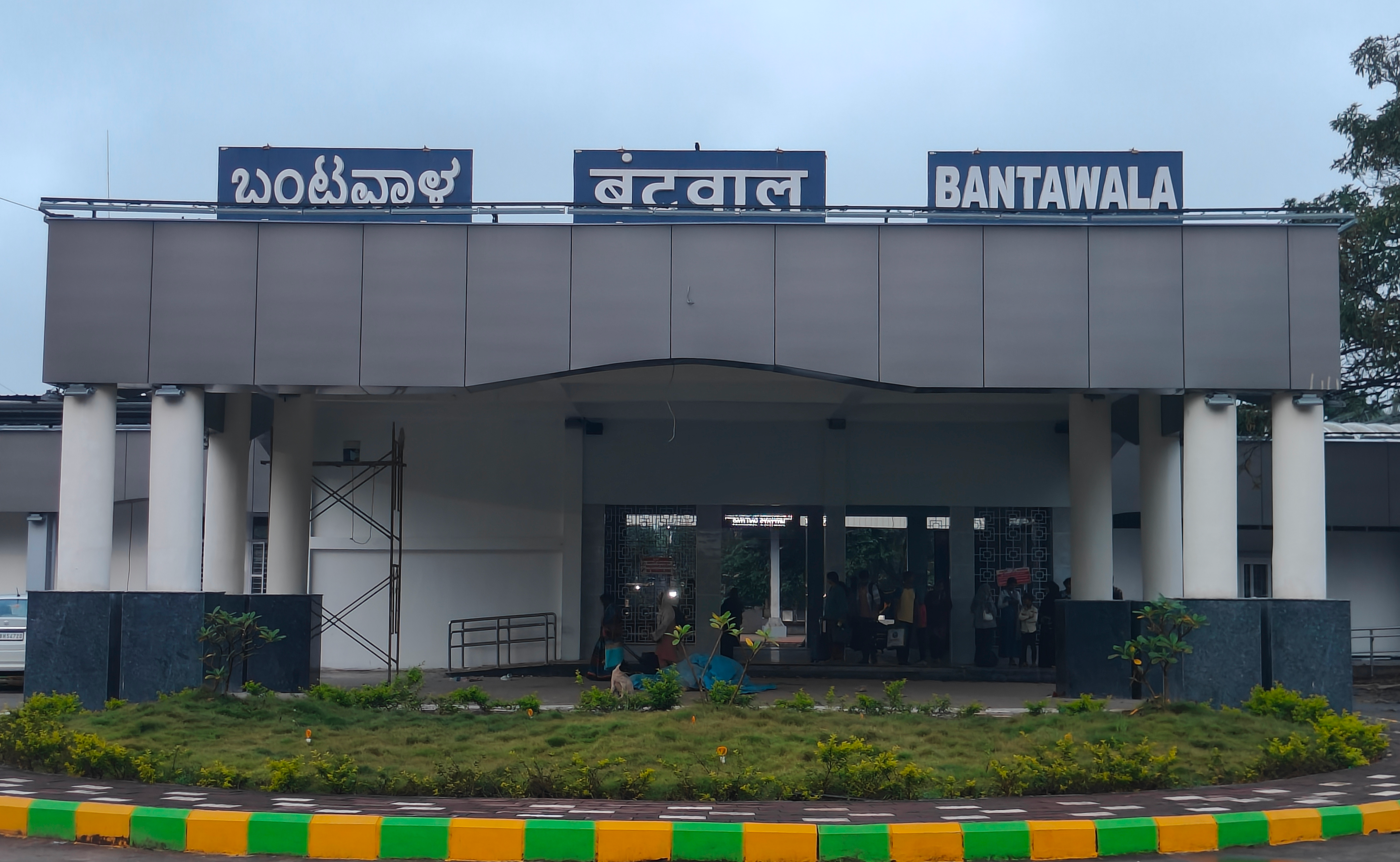
Bantwala Railway Station

Many buses ply to nearby places such as Mudipu, Moodabidri, Surathkal, Mulki, Kinnigoli, Vitla operate from the B. C Road bus stand. The railway station at B. C Road is maintained by south western railways. The Mangalore port is about 30 kilometres from here. Mangalore International Airport is about 45 minutes from B.C Road.

== See also ==
- Mithur
