= Culture of Mangalorean Catholics =

Culture of the Catholics of Mangalore district

The culture of Mangalorean Catholics has been shaped by their Christianisation in Goa, their migrations& their captivity. They adopted elements of the local Mangalorean culture, but retained many of their Konkani customs and values. The ethnic Mangalorean houses of the older generation have spacious porticos, red oxide cemented floors, terra cotta roofs layered with the once famous Mangalore tiles. The houses are usually accompanied by their own private wells or ponds, and are normally attached to orchards of coconut trees, jackfruit trees, ice apple trees, Alphonso mango trees, areca nut trees etc.

== Architecture ==
Mangalore tile

A German missionary, Georg Plebst, set up the first tile factory at Mangalore in 1860. It was called the Basel Mission tile factory. In the course of time, Mangalorean Catholics learnt the technique of preparing Mangalore tiles and the Albuquerque tile factory, the first Indian Mangalore tile manufacturing factory was started in South Canara by Pascal Albuquerque, a Mangalorean Catholic, at Panemangalore in 1868. Since then, Mangalorean Catholics have been actively involved in manufacturing these red Mangalore tiles. After the opening of the Albuquerque tile factory, the Alvares tile factory was established in Mangalore by Simon Alvares, a Mangalorean Catholic from Bombay, in 1878. In 1991–92, out of 12 tile manufacturing factories in Mangalore, 6 were owned by Christians. These tiles, prepared from hard clay, were in great demand throughout India, Myanmar, and Sri Lanka, and were even shipped to East Africa, the Middle-East, Europe, and Australia. These were the only tiles to be recommended for Government buildings in India, and still define Mangalore's skyline and characterise its urban setting. Urban and rural housing follows the old traditional variety of laterite-brick structures with Mangalore tile roofing with steep slopes. Inside the house, a spacious hall is present while a large verandah is present in front of the house.

== Cuisine ==
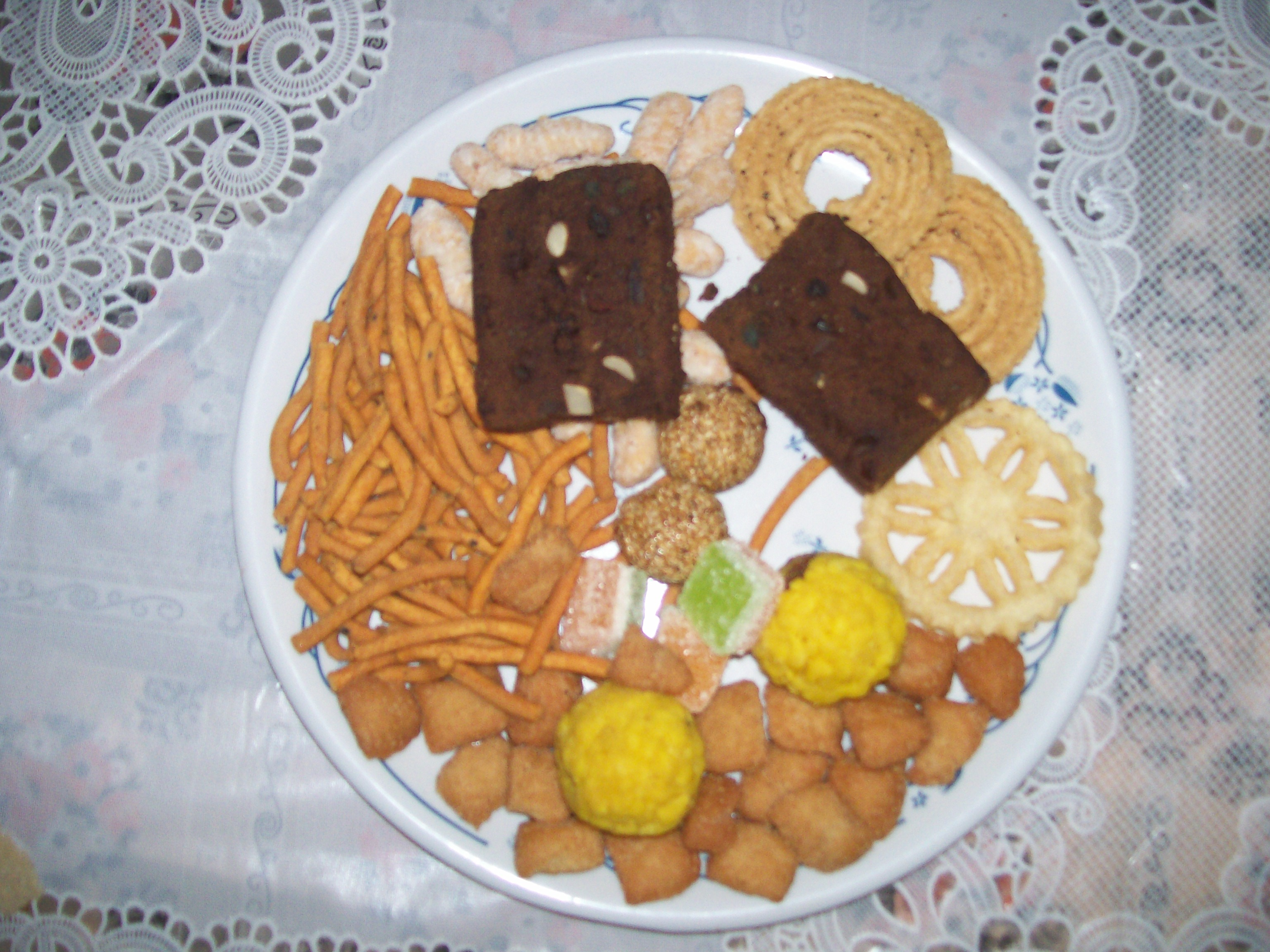
Kuswar are sweet delicacies prepared during Christmas

Coconut and curry leaves are common ingredients to most curries. Sanna-Dukra Maas (Sanna – idli fluffed with toddy or yeast; Dukra Maas – Pork) is one of the most popular dish of the Mangalorean Catholic community. Rosachi Kadi (Ros Curry), a fish curry made with coconut milk (ros), is a traditional curry served during the Ros ceremony. Patrode, a dish of colocasia leaves stuffed with rice, dal, jaggery, coconut, and spices is also popular. Kuswar are sweet delicacies prepared during Christmas and includes around 22 varieties of sweets. Fish and rice form the staple diet of most Mangalorean Catholics. Par-boiled rice, also known as red rice, is the traditional rice eaten and preferred over raw rice.

== Names and surnames ==
Bilingual names, having variants in both Konkani and English, like Zuãuñ (John) and Mornel (Magdalene) are common among Mangalorean Catholics. Most Mangalorean Catholic names for males follow the second declension. Among women, the names follow the first declension, while among young girls, the names follow the second declension. The Mangalorean Catholic variant of many first names is the Mangalorean Catholic Konkani version of its Portuguese counterpart which was borrowed from the Portuguese language (examples include Zâbel from the Portuguese Isabel, Zuãuñ from the Portuguese João, Pedru from the Portuguese Pedro, and Zoze from the Portuguese José). Portuguese surnames like D'Souza and Pinto are abundant among Mangalorean Catholics, and generally follow the second declension. Some families use their original Goud Saraswat Brahmin surnames such as Prabhu, Kamat, Pai, and Shenoy. Other European surnames are also found.

| Mangalorean Catholic variant | English variant | Portuguese variant | Meaning | Sex |
|---|---|---|---|---|
| Mâri | Mary | Maria | Beloved | Female |
| Monku | Monica | Mónica | To advise | Female |
| Motes | Matthew | Mateus | Gift from God | Male |
| Nâtu | Natalia | Natalia | Birthday | Female |
| Pedru | Peter | Pedro | Stone | Male |
| Šila | Sylvester | Silas | Wooded | Male |
| Zâbel | Elizabeth | Isabel | My God is my oath | Female |
| Zoze | Joseph | José | The Lord will add | Male |
Sources: English-Konkani Dictionary (2001) and A Konkani Grammar (2003)

== Language and literature ==
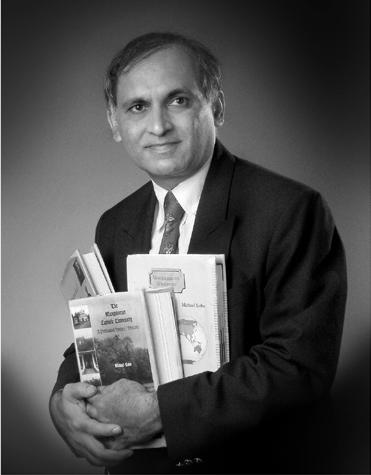
Michael Lobo published the first genealogical encyclopaedia of the Mangalorean Catholic community in 1999

Mangalorean Catholics speak the Konkani language, which they retained as their mother tongue despite the migration. The Konkani language is central to the community's identity. Konkani is an Indo-Aryan language belonging to the Indo-European family of languages, which is spoken predominantly on the west coast of India. They speak a dialect of Konkani, known as Mangalorean Catholic Konkani, which the Ethnologue identifies as the Mangalore dialect. It is largely derived from the Bardeskaar (North Goan) dialect and bears a good degree of intelligibility with the modern Bardeskaar Christian dialect and to a slightly lesser extent with the standard Konkani dialect. This dialect has a significant infusion of Tulu and Kannada loanwords. Some Kannada root words which have disappeared from the Goan dialects due to the influence of Portuguese have re-entered the Mangalorean Canara language lexicon. It is significantly different from the dialect spoken by the Goud Saraswat Brahmins in South Canara. The Mangalorean Catholic dialect is much closer to the Goan Bardezi dialect. 350–400 Portuguese lexical items are found in the Mangalorean Catholic dialect.

The origin of their literature dates to 1883, when Angelus Francis Xavier Maffei, an Italian Jesuit, published the first English-Konkani Dictionary in Mangalore. In 1912, the first Konkani periodical, Konknni Dirvem (Konkani Treasure), was published in Mangalore by Louis Mascarenhas. Popular Konkani periodicals published in Mangalore include Raknno (1938) by Mons Sylvester Menezes, Konkan Daiz (Heritage of Konkani) (1958), and Kannik (Donation) (1965) by Raymond Miranda. In Bombay, periodicals like Sukh-Dukh (1948) by G.M.B. Rodrigues, Konknni Yuvak (1949) by George Fernandes, Poinnari (1950) by V.J.P. Saldanha, and Divo (1995) by J.B. Moraes were published. Modern literature is diverse and includes themes such as Indian Politics in books like What Ails the Socialists by George Fernandes, historical awakening, in books such as Sarasvati's Children: A History of the Mangalorean Christians by Alan Machado Prabhu, and sexual desires, in The Revised Kama Sutra: A Novel of Colonialism and Desire by Richard Crasta.

The Mangalorean genealogist Michael Lobo published the first genealogical Encyclopaedia of the Mangalorean Catholic community in 1999. This genealogical Encyclopaedia, currently exceeding 6000 pages, covers over a thousand families, each of which is researched as far as its ancestry can be traced. Three offshoots have thus far been launched, which include Mangaloreans Worldwide — An International Directory (1999), Distinguished Mangalorean Catholics (2000), and The Mangalorean Catholic Community — A Professional History / Directory (2002). In 2000, the Diocese of Mangalore released the first Konkani Bible in Kannada script, which was made available online on 26 July 2007.

== Traditions and festivals ==
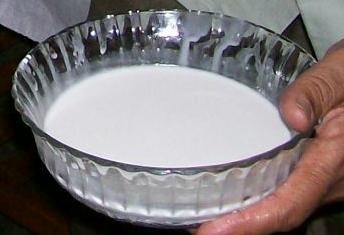
A Mangalorean Catholic Ros

Roman Catholic traditions include the Sakrament (Seven Sacraments) and include Povitr-Snan (Baptism), Thiravnni (Confirmation), Krist-Prasad (Eucharist), Prachit (Penance), Piddestanchi Makhnni (Anointing of the Sick), Iazokanchi Sonskornni (Holy Orders) and Logn (Matrimony).

Mangalorean Catholics have retained many Indian customs and traditions and reveal their existence especially during the celebration of a marriage. Their culture is more traditional and Indian. Though the Portuguese traded quite frequently in Mangalore, and most of the priests arriving in the region were Portuguese, there did not develop a community identified with Portugal and Portuguese culture. They have no uniform rituals since they belong to both the patrilineal Brahmin stock and to the matrilineal non-Brahmin stock. It were mainly these Pagan marriage rites which the Portuguese during the Goan Inquisition found objectionable and prohibited it in a Manual of Rules and Regulations of the Holy Office of the Inquisition in the Kingdoms of Portugal, published in 1640 by Bishop D. Franciscode Castro.

Ros (anointing) ceremony, conducted one or two days before a wedding, celebrates the last day of virginity of the bride and bridegroom and involves the parents' blessing of the bride and groom, who are anointed with ros, a mixture of coconut milk and coconut oil, while a cross is inscribed on the bride's forehead. Later, it is followed by the Resper (Nuptial Blessing in Church) and finally the Vordik^{[e]} (wedding) and Voran (wedding party). Other traditions include Soirik or Sairikecho Malo (betrothal), Voulik (wedding invitation) and exchange of Paan Pod or Bido^{[a]} (betel leaves) during marriage ceremonies, which was called badalchen (changing hands).^{[b]} Indian traditions include adorning the bride with the Sado (wedding sari) and Pirduk^{[d]} (wedding necklace), the wearing of which indicates her Ayaponn (destiny), the Onpnni or Opsun divnchen (giving away the bride formally by the father or the guardian of the bride), Porthoponn (re-invitation to the bride's house), and singing of Honvious (hymns). Some other traditions include Novemjeevon (partaking of the food prepared from new corn) and Novem (blessing of new harvests).

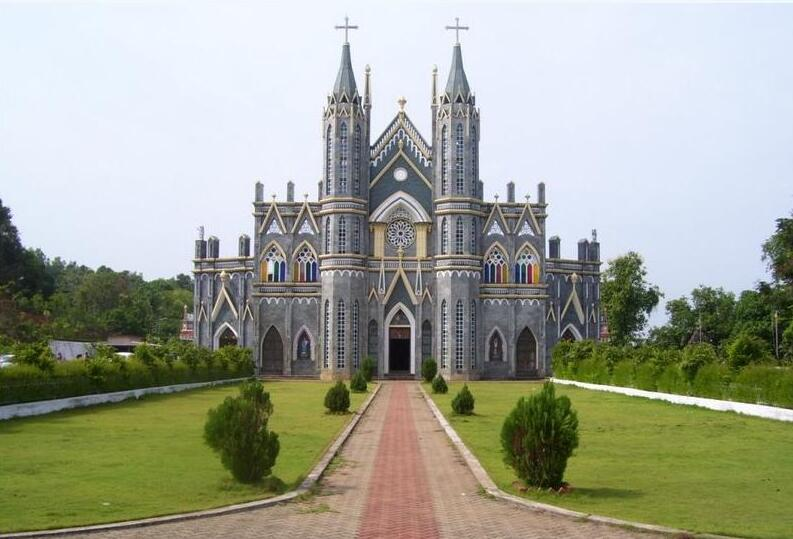
The St. Lawrence Church in Karkala, where the Attur festival is celebrated

In addition to common Christian festivals like Christmas, Good Friday, and Easter, the community celebrates many other festivals of religious and historical significance. Monti Fest is one of the major festivals, celebrated on 8 September. It combines the Nativity of the Blessed Virgin Mary and blessing of Novem (new crops). The festival derives its name from the Monte Mariano Church at Farangipet in South Canara, and was initiated by Joachim Miranda, a Goan Catholic priest at Farangipet in 1763. Though Tipu Sultan destroyed the churches of Canara, he spared Monte Mariano Church in deference to the friendship of his father Hyder Ali with Father Miranda. Attur Jatre or Attur Fest (Attur festival) is the feast of St. Lawrence, celebrated in the St. Lawrence Shrine on the outskirts of Karkala in South Canara. This shrine, in existence since 1759, is said to have a history of miracles. Eucharistic Procession (Evkaristik Purshanv in Konkani) is an annual religious procession led by the Bishop of Mangalore from Milagres Church to Rosario Cathedral. The procession, held on the first Sunday of the New Year of the Gregorian calendar, seeks blessings for the new year.

== Costumes and Ornaments ==
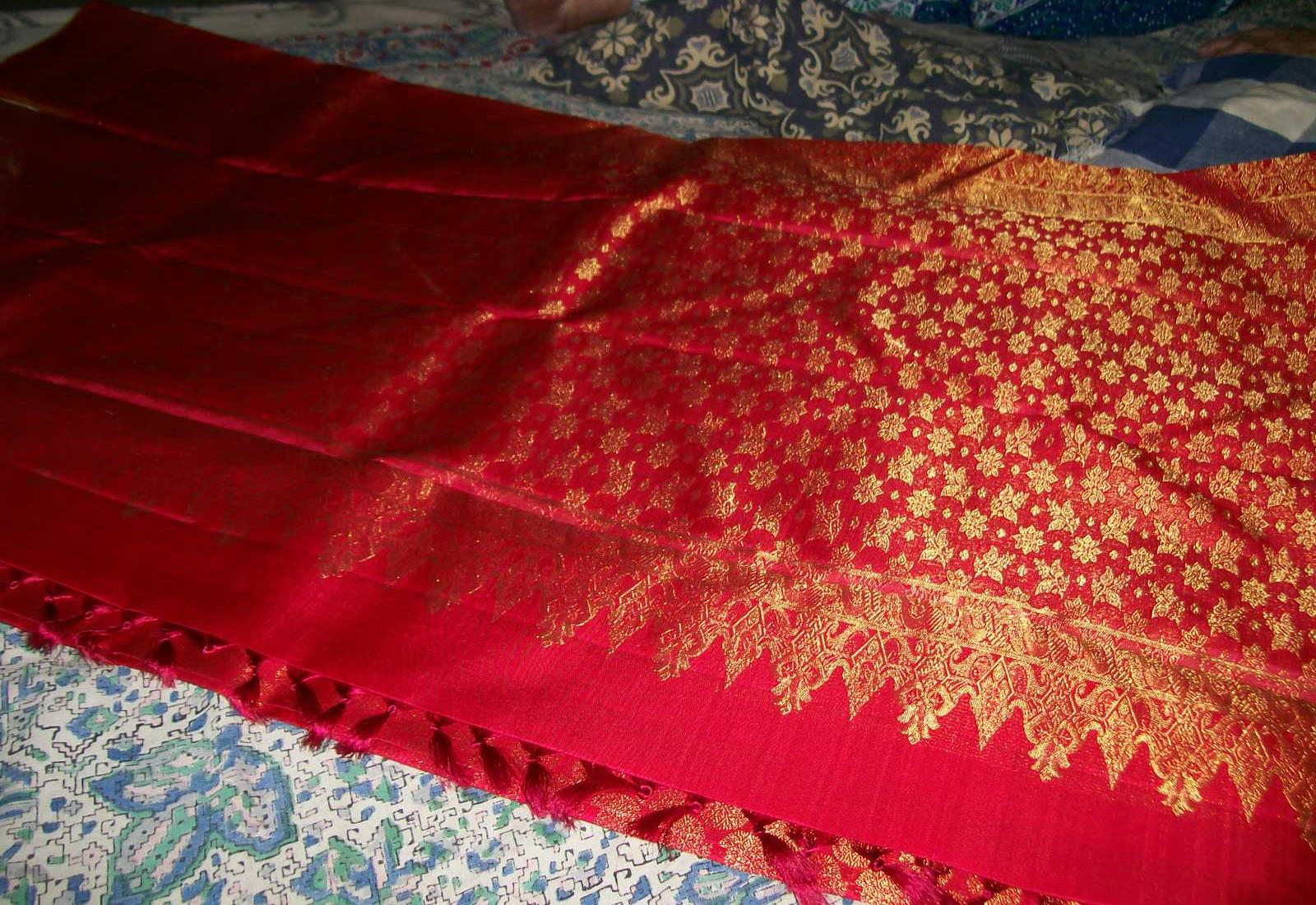
A typical Mangalorean Catholic wedding sari (sado)

Mangalorean Catholic men used to wear white or black coats (similar to the bandhgala) with buttons. The turbans were usually flattened like the Coorgi turbans (urmal). The urmal is a long white piece of cloth with a golden hem and is tied around the head like a turban. In modern times, this mode has changed. Only a few old men can be seen wearing this traditional dress on church going occasions. Before marriage, women used to wear white skirts over which sarees and blouses were worn. The dress was a sign of her virginity and she wore it on the day of ros or roce ceremony. Gold ornaments in those days were absent. Married women used to wear sarees the general way.

The Mangalorean Catholic bride's sari is known as a sado. It is usually a red coloured Benaresi sari, which are made of finely woven silk and are decorated with elaborate engravings. The bride is also presented with another sari by her own people which is called dharma sado, which was worn on other festive occasions. Some brides also wear a white sari during the nuptial blessing in church. Ornaments worn by the bride in ancient times included kanti, chakrasar, kap, karap, mugud, kanto, and dantoni. Except datoni none of these ornaments are in use in the modern generation. Present-day brides wear a few gold ornaments, some rings on the fingers, earrings and at least two of the golden combs known as dantoni that consisted of two ordinary combs and the upper part of each one was plate with gold, that are worn in the hair on both sides of the headover the ears. On the way to church she wears some white and red flowers stuck in the hair. In the centre of the forehead, a bang (gold chain) was placed with a pendant. A widow had to wear a black sari all her life, and was not allowed to wear ornaments.

Two more combs were worn by the bride, with a figure of a fish in gold inserted in each comb and were therefore called masli (fish). The hair is well combed and parted in the middle of the forehead. This fashion is strictly observed. A girl parting her hair in any other manner was regarded a loose girl. In the centre of the forehead where the hair is parted, a gold chain was placed with a pendant. This chain was called bang. None of these ornaments are worn on ordinary days. Every bride formerly wore three pairs of gold bangles; in addition she wore bangles of red glass.

The bridegroom's dress in the early times consisted of a breechcloth (dhoti), a shawl to cover his shoulders and a red handkerchief on the head (leis). The groom's dress was gradually improved. Later, his dress consisted of a white or yellow breechcloth (dhoti) with a red and gold hem (todop), and a coat (kutav) and a towel on the head. The bridegroom wore a chakrasar (neck chain) around his neck. He wore a pair of sandals or at least a pair of socks. Nowadays, most Mangalorean Catholic couples have a White wedding, where in the groom typically wears a black suit, while the bride wears a white dress.

== Historical Society ==
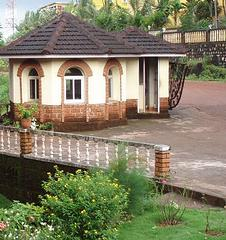
A traditional house of a Mangalorean Catholic family, constructed using olden-style architecture.

Mangalorean Catholics had retained the same caste system which their ancestors had in Goa. They were divided into four castes — Bāmaṇs, Charodis, Shudras, and Gaudis. The Bāmaṇs (the Konkani word for Brahmins) were converts from the Brahmin caste (priestly class), and especially included the Saraswat Brahmin converts from Goa. The Charodis, the largest group, were converts from the Kshatriya (warrior class) and Vaishya (merchant class) castes. The artisan converts formed the third biggest group and were known as Shudras (labour class). The converts from the fisher-caste residing around Ullal, Kuloor and other places around the sea coast were called Gaudis, and formed the fourth group. Other minor castes, included the Padvals, who the historian Severine Silva, in his book "The Marriage Customs of the Christians in South Canara, India", assumes to be local Jain converts.

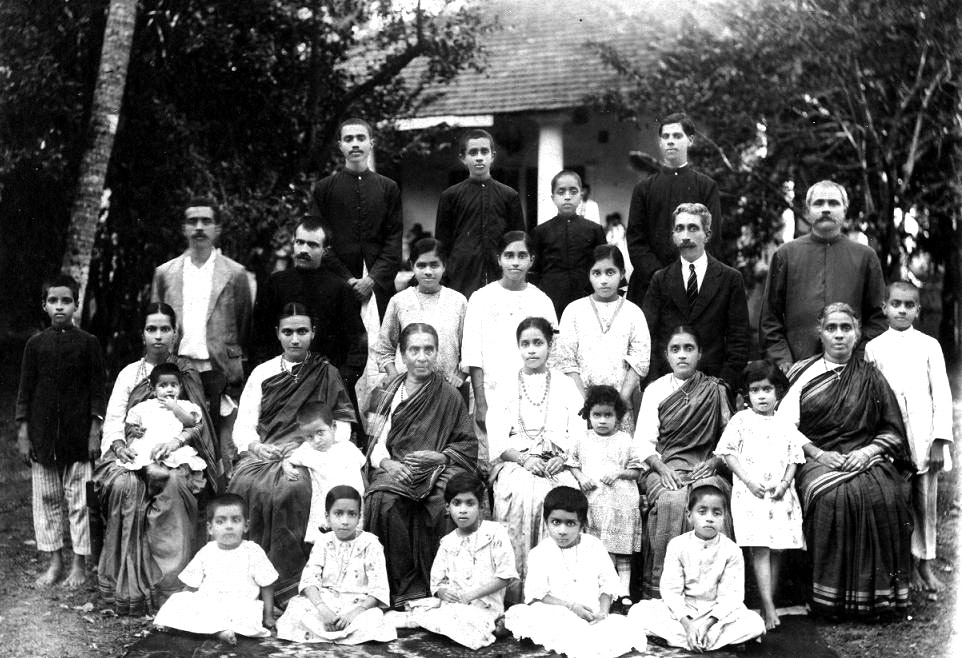
An extended Catholic family in Mangalore, belonging to the Bāmaṇ caste. Circa. 1929.

It was difficult for the few priests who had accompanied the Christian emigrants to South Canara to look after them properly. Thus, the gurkar system came into existence. Gurkars were Mangalorean Catholic men of good moral character who were selected as headmen in Christian settlements. They were entrusted the work of social and religious supervision of the community. After migration, the only possible occupation of a Mangalorean Catholic was agriculture, since they were skilled farmers. Every farmer practised carpentry but it was quite primitive and unskilled. Other crafts and industries were non-existent. By the later half of the 19th century Mangalorean Catholics were involved in the Mangalore tile industry, Coffee plantations and trade in plantation products. The mass was celebrated in Latin; but the sermon, the cathecism, and the explication of the mysteries were delivered to the congregation in Konkani.

A widow had to remain indoors practically for the rest of her life. Canon Law did allow remarriage for widows and therefore there was no direct prohibition for widows to remarry in the society of the Christians of South Canara, but few women had the courage to go against the strict conventions of their community. A widow who remarried was looked down upon, pitied and shunned as unlucky. But she was not ill-treated or made an outcast. No stigma was attached to her husband.

== Songs and music ==
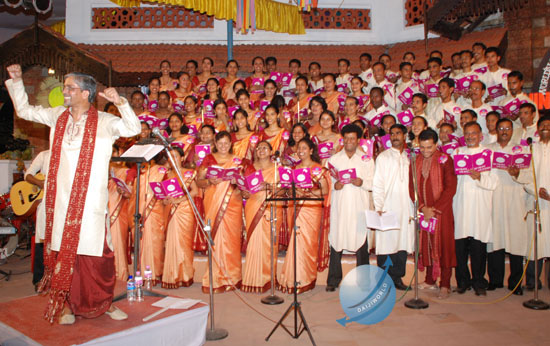
Konkani Nirantari, a Konkani cultural event, entered the Guinness Book of World Records for non-stop singing of Konkani hymns.

On 26–27 January 2008, a Konkani cultural event, Konkani Nirantari, held in Mangalore by a Mangalorean Catholic organisation, Mandd Sobhann, entered the Guinness Book of World Records for non-stop singing of Konkani hymns. Mandd Sobhann members sang for 40 hours, surpassing the old record of 36 hours held by a Brazilian musical troupe, Communidade Evangelica Luterana São Paulo (Lutheran Evangelical Community of São Paulo) of Universidade Luterana do Brasil (Lutheran University of Brazil). The Silver Band, started in 1906 by Lawrence D'Souza in Mangalore, is one of the oldest and most popular brass bands in Mangalore. The well known Konkani hymn Riglo Jezu Molliant (Jesus entered the Garden of Gethsemene) was written by Joachim Miranda, a Goan Catholic priest, during the 18th century, when he was held captive by Tippu Sultan, on his Canara mission. Other popular Konkani hymns composed by Mangalorean Catholics are Aika Cristanv Jana, Utha Utha Praniya, and Sorgim Thaun. The ghumat was a popular musical instrument played especially during weddings. The instrument has the form of an earthen pot but is open at both sides. One end is covered with the skin of some wild animal, and the other is left open. The tradition of voviyos (wedding songs), sung by women during a Ros, is important to this community. The procedure is that one of the elderly lady, usually the yejman (wife of the master of ceremonies, who is known as yejmani) who knows the voviyos leads the song while the rest of the women sing along with her. Only women whose husbands are still living may sing. In ancient times the wedding songs expressed very lofty sentiments and gave vent to the feelings of the people about the marriage partners and their families, invoking the blessing of God on them.

Goiam thaun aili mai, Ruzai Saibin,
There came a Mother from Goa, Our Lady (Queen) of the Rosary, Meklya kesanim mai, Dev li somdirak
Adorned with long lovely hair, She made her abode here (in South Canara).

— Folk song taken "Bardesachi Sima" (boundary of Bardez) from The Marriage customs of the Christians in South Canara, India by Severine Silva and Stephen Fuchs,

Aprosachi vatli, kasgran petli, ruzai mai betli, hea rosalagim.
The Ros brass plate is made by brass smith, our Lady of Rosary is here at this ros ceremony

Dimbi ami galeam, santa kuru kadeam, kurpa ami magieam amchea Jezulagim
Let us kneel, make sign of the cross, and pray for God's grace

Akashim mod, narl kubear telacho kuris hokleachea kopalar
Clouds in the sky, coconut on the tree, oily sign of cross on the forehead of the bride

— Voviyos taken from The Tradition of Voviyo article by Maurice D’Mello
