= Mangalore tiles =

Type of roofing tile originating in India

Mangalore tile

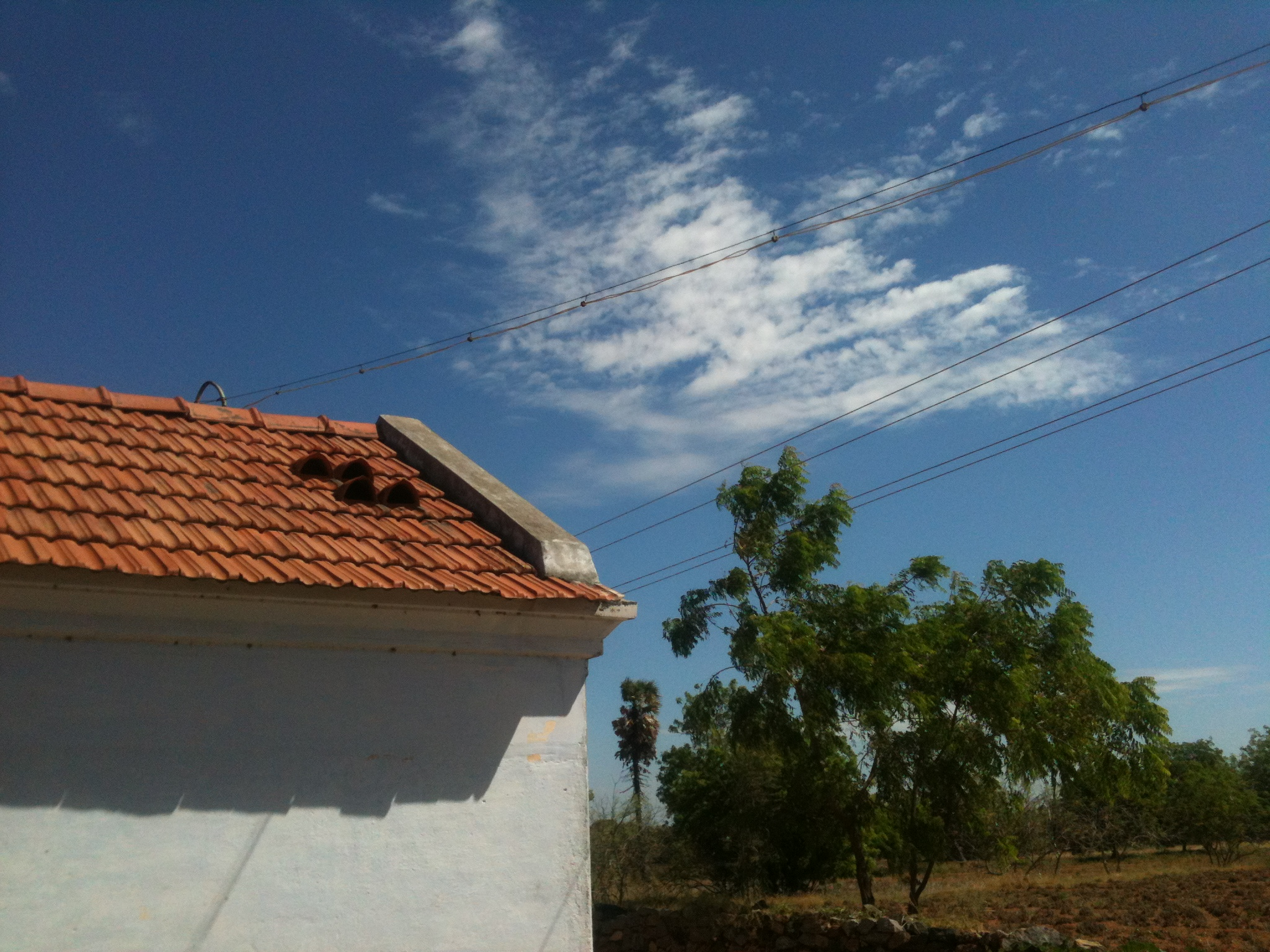
Mangalore tiles, on a house in Tamil Nadu, Southern India

Mangalore tiles (also Mangalorean tiles) are a type of roof tile produced in the city of Mangalore, India. Tiles were first produced in the city by German missionaries of the Basel Mission of Switzerland, who also established weaving enterprises. Early Mangalore tiles followed the designs of the Gilardoni brothers of Altkirch, France, but over time the predominant pattern used was based on Wilhelm Ludowici's 1881 design for roof tile.

Since that time, the industry grew in India with these tiles in great demand throughout the country. They were exported to Myanmar, Sri Lanka, the Far East and as far as East Africa, the Middle East, Europe, and Australia. These were the only roof tiles recommended for government buildings in India under the British Raj.

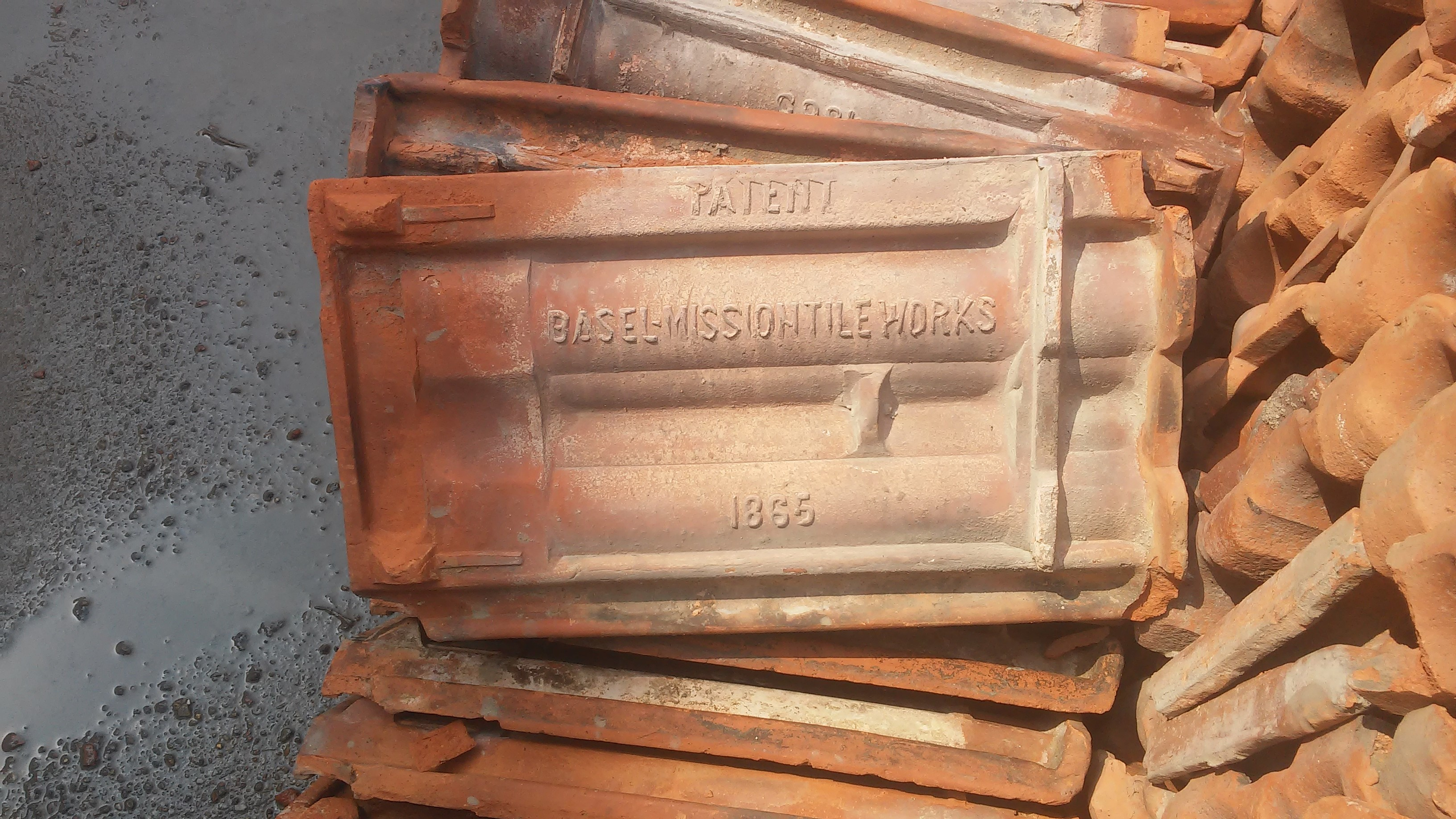
Old Manglore tiles, from an old site in Karachi, Pakistan.

These tiles still define Mangalore's skyline and characterize its urban setting. They are a popular form of roofing and are preferred over concrete due to their higher quality.

== Etymology ==
These tiles are native to Mangalore, a city in the former South Canara district on the western coast of India. Hence they were named Mangalore tiles by the tile factory manufacturers.

== History ==
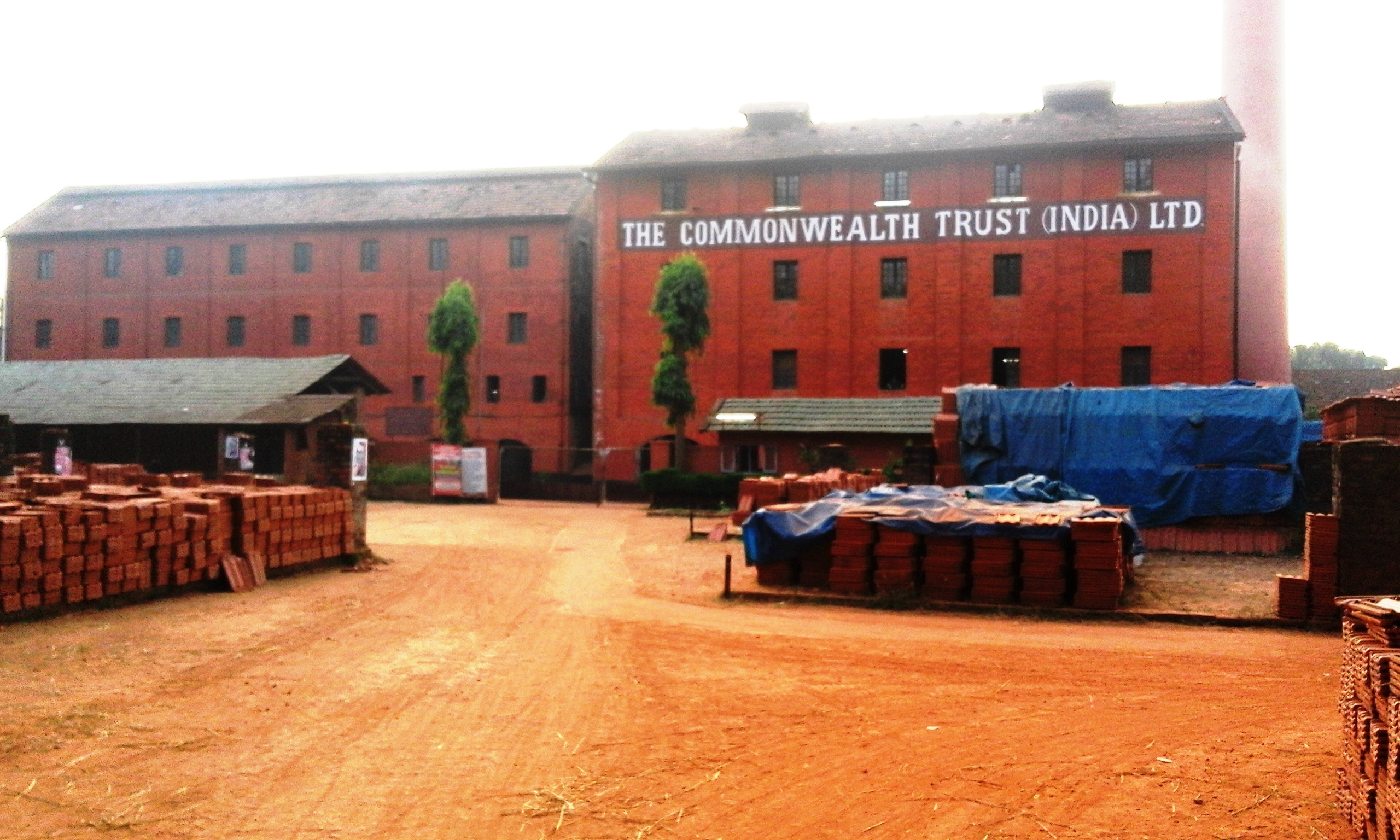
Tile Factory in Feroke, India

Georg Plebst, a German missionary, had been with the Basel Mission in India since 1851 and worked to improve the mission's lithographic press office in Mangalore. His attention shifted towards local pottery, and he was intrigued by trying to resolve the issues commonly seen. He urged the mission to establish an industrial ceramic unit and traveled to Alsace, France, home of the Gilardoni Brothers' tile factory, to study industrial methods of ceramic manufacturing.

Plebst returned to India and relied on local expertise to establish his factory, called the Basel Mission tile factory or "The Common Wealth Trust Ltd." The factory began producing tiles on December 4, 1865 with just two workers, using clay from the banks of the Gurupura (also Phalguni) and Nethravathi (also Bantwal) rivers. The new company used interlocking tiles, which were an innovation allowing for fewer tiles to cover a larger area, cutting down on roof weight.

Plebst's factory was the first industrial tile plant in India, located on the banks of the Nethravathi river, near Morgan's Gate, around 100 metres (0.10 km) from Ullal bridge.

Several other tile factories were established in the years that followed. In 1868, the Albuquerque tile factory producing these tiles was started by Mr.Pascal Albuquerque at Panemangalore in South Canara. These were the only tiles to be recommended for Government buildings in India during the British regime. The Chhatrapati Shivaji Terminus, a World Heritage Site is also topped with these tiles due to their excellent quality and were preferred over Bombay tiles by the structure's architect Frederick William Stevens.

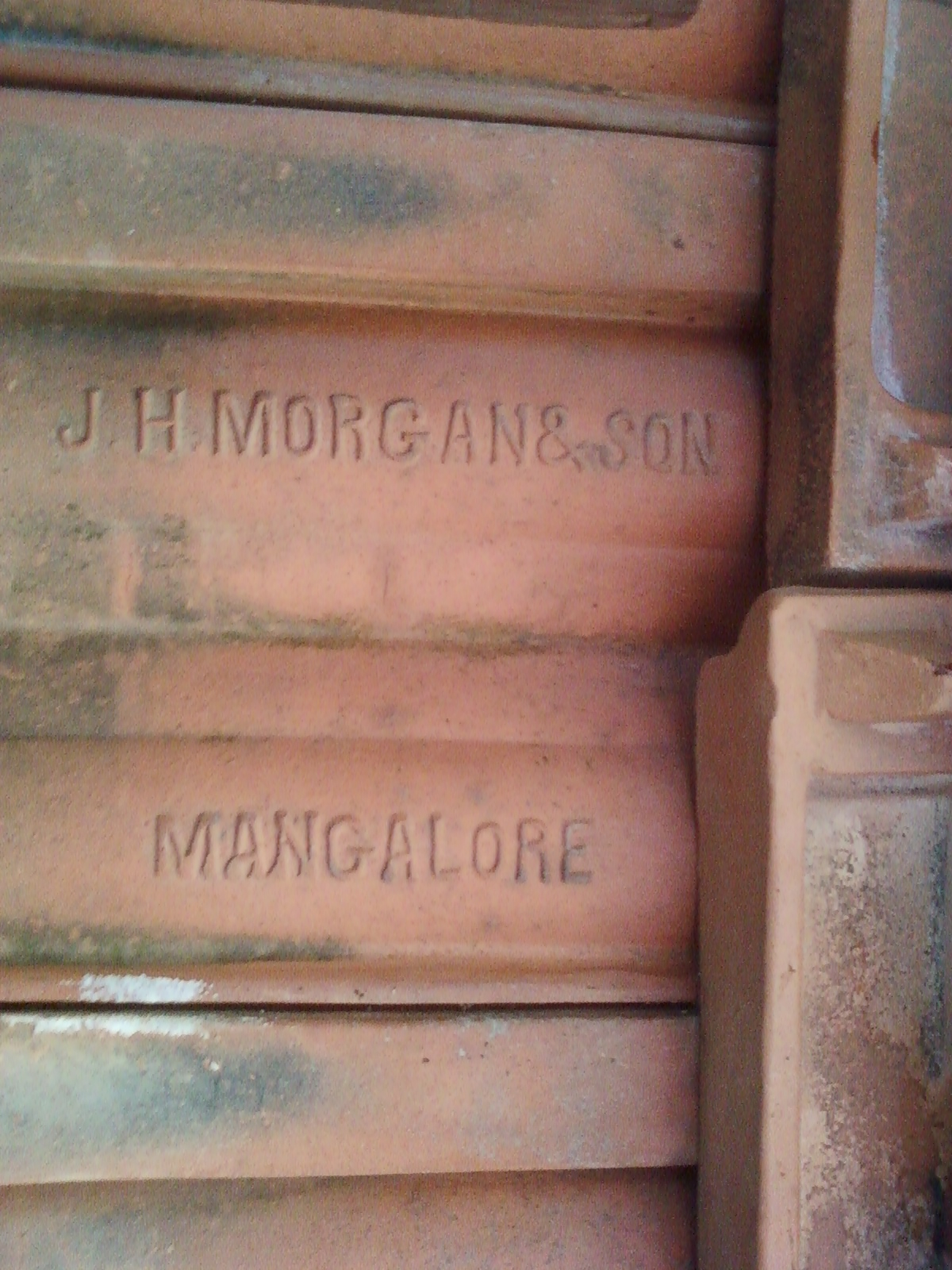
Mangalore tile manufactured by J. H. Morgan & Sons (Mangalore)

Since the opening of the Albuquerque tile factory, Mangaloreans have been actively involved in manufacturing these red Mangalore tiles. In 1878, it was followed by the Alvares tile factory established by Mr.Simon Alvares of Bombay at Mangalore. The tiles produced by the factory were in great demand throughout the Indian subcontinent and East Africa. Abundant deposits of clay, plenty of firewood from the Western Ghats and cheap skilled labour helped the industry flourish. By the 1900s there were around 25 tile factories situated in and around Mangalore. By 1994 around 75 tile factories were present in Mangalore. As per the years 1991—1992 out of a selected 12 tile factories, 6 were owned by Hindus and the other 6 by Christians. The factories along with these tiles also manufactured materials such as ridges, limestone and bricks.

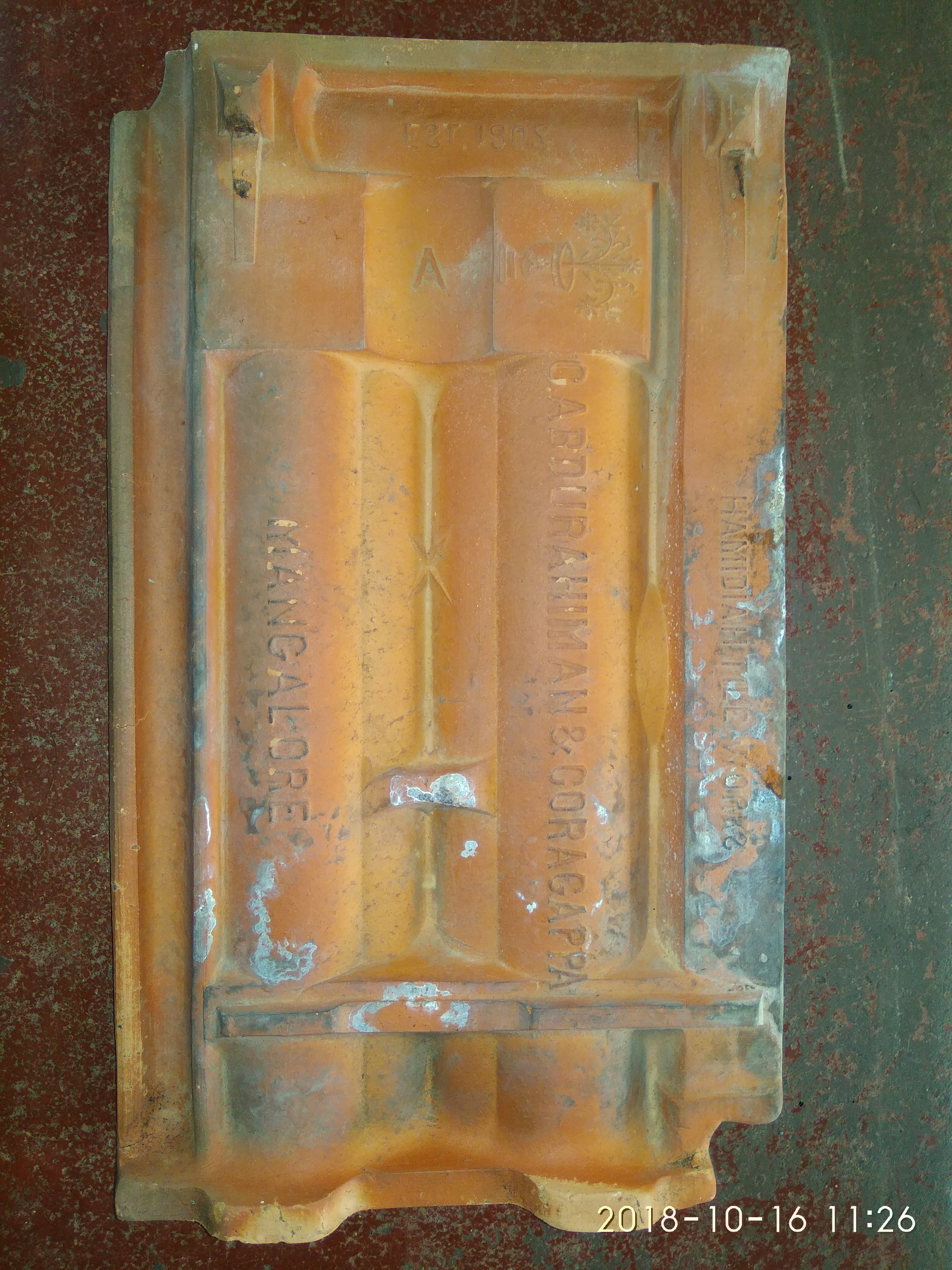
A Mangalore Tile from Adhyaksha Coragappa's Tile factory

The prominent tile factories in Mangalore of the bygone era were
1) The Common Wealth Trust Ltd (Established by Basel Mission in 1860) - This is supposed to be the first tile factory in Mangalore and thereby India.
2) A Albuquerque and Sons (Established in 1868).
3) Alvares Tile factory (Established by Simon Alvares in 1878)
4) Hammer Tiles (Established by Mahalakshmi traders in 1889).
5) Hamidiah Tile works (Established by Adhyaksha H. Koragappa(Founder of Kudroli Shree Gokarnanatheshwara Temple Mangalore) and C.Abdurahiman in 1905)
6) King George Tiles (Established in 1905).
7) JH Morgan and son.
8) Rego and sons.
9) Pioneer Tiles.
10) BK Tiles.

The Calicut Tile Co. (CTC) was the first fully mechanised roofing tile manufacturer in India. It was started in the year 1878. Besides roofing tiles, CTC also manufactures ceiling tiles, hourdees, hollow blocks, paver tiles, decorative garden tiles and terracotta products. The company is currently fully operational. The products CTC at Ferok are known and sold under the brand name Queen. They have another factory in the state of Karnataka. The products are known under the brand name King.

In 2007, the industry suffered when about 10 tile factories shut down due to scarcity of raw materials like clay, and factories struggled to find skilled and cooperative workers.

== Quality and Usage ==
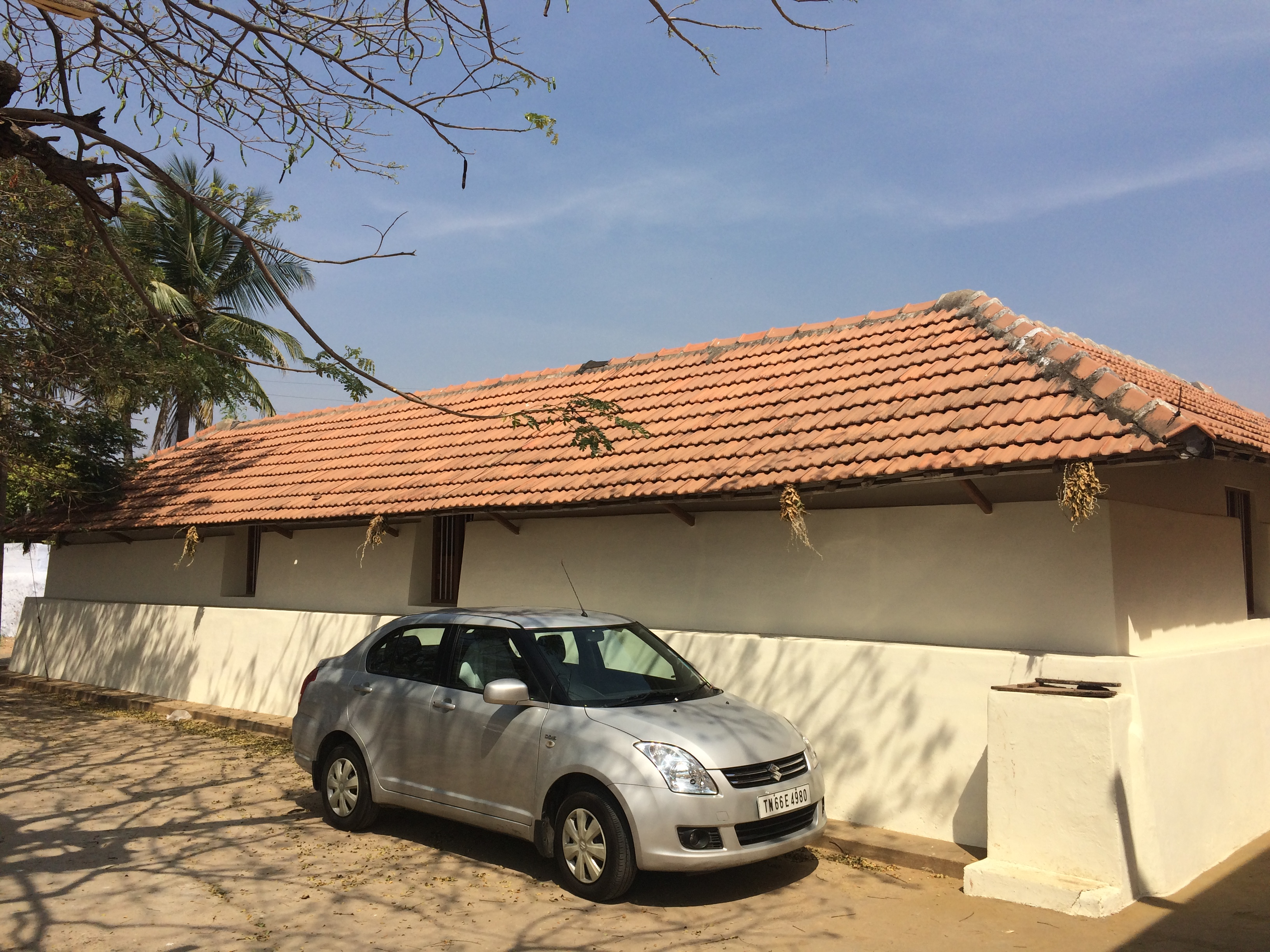
House in Coimbatore district with Mangalore tiles

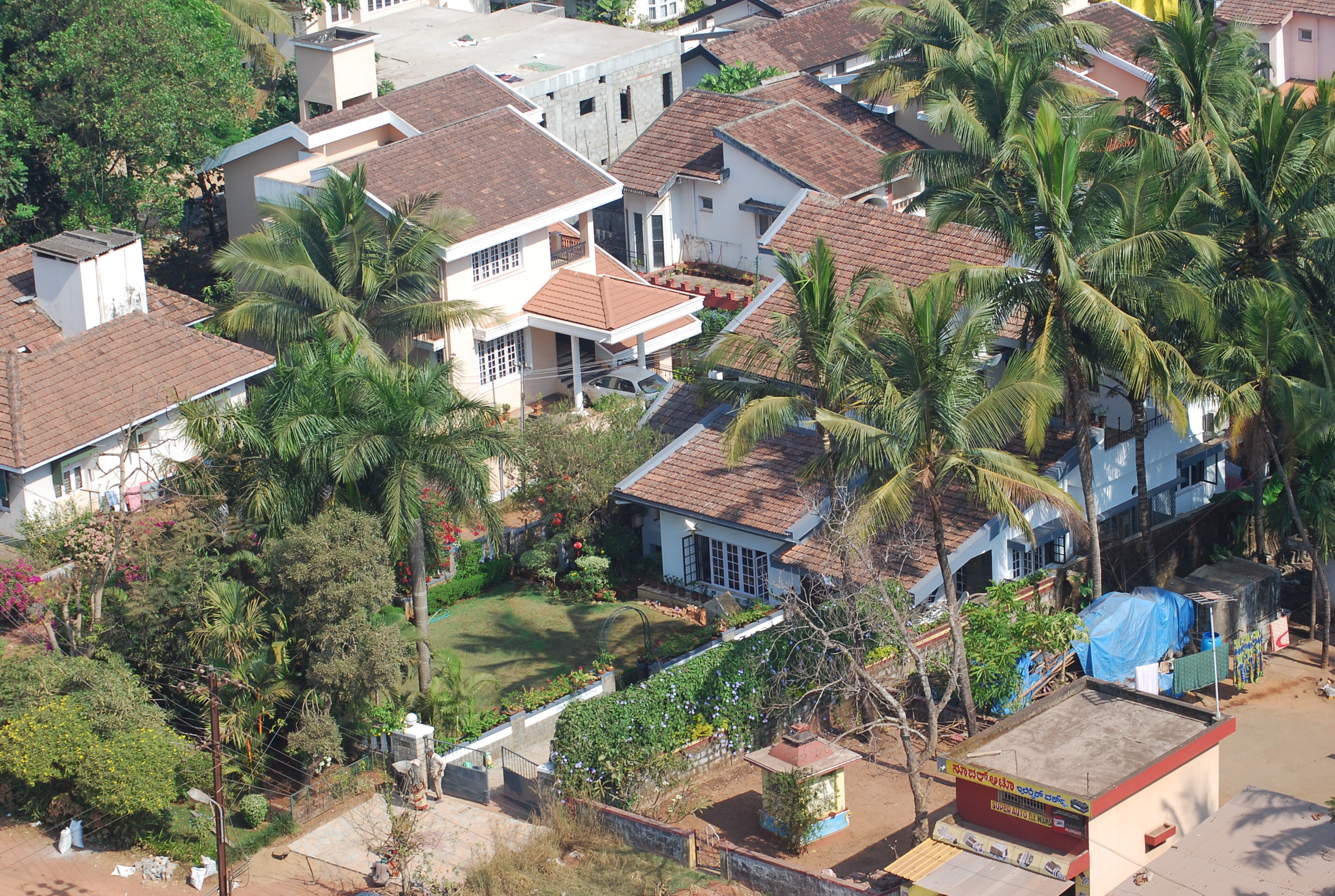
These tiles define Mangalore's skyline and characterize its urban setting

Mangalore tiles are said to provide excellent ventilation especially during summer and are widely considered aesthetically pleasing. Some of them are especially made to be used for roofing kitchens, allowing smoke to escape, and bathrooms. Over a period of time, these tiles can become dark to black from constant exposure to soot and smoke. Clay tiles offer natural solar insulation, thereby reducing the expense on electricity for heating or cooling.

Since these clay tiles are molded under extreme heat, they are resistant to damage or destruction from fire.

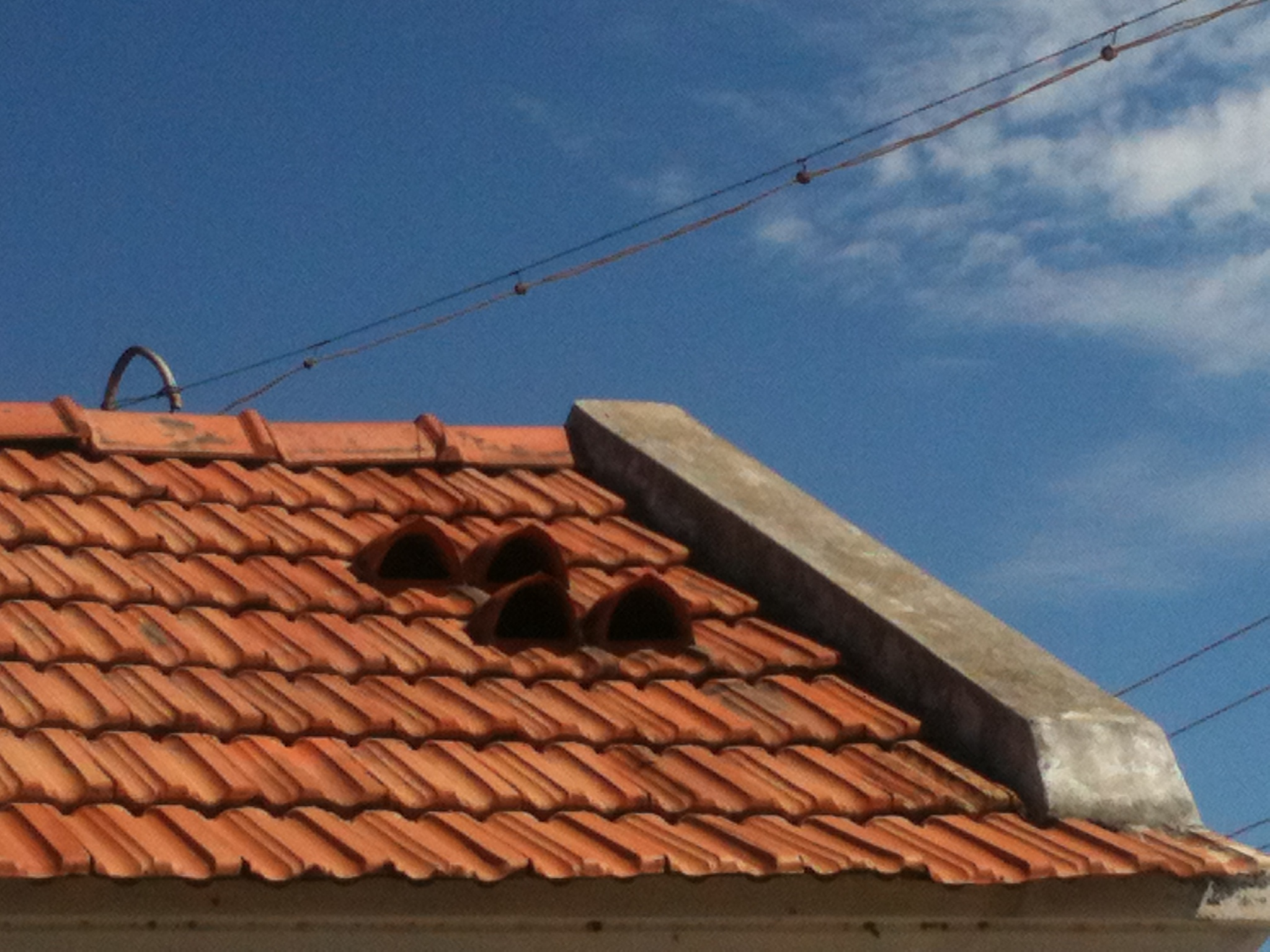
Mangalore tiles, sometimes known as Calicut tiles closeup view

These red-colored clay tiles are exported to all the corners of the world. They are available in different shapes and sizes depending on the users need.

Clay tiles are commonly used in coastal areas and regions that experience heavy rainfall. Clay tiles for a sloping roof offer water proofing in areas where it rains quite often. Clay's corrosion resistance allows for superior longevity compared to other materials. The Mangalore tiles are generally placed inclined at forty five degrees. The tiles get their red colour from the high proportion of iron compound found in the laterite clay. A tile weighs about 2 kilograms (4.4 lb) to 3 kilograms (6.6 lb). These kinds of tiles are most popularly used in Canara, Goa, Kerala, and the Konkan.

== Preparation ==
First, laterite clay is collected, placed in a mold, and precisely cut to measurement. Then the piece of clay is placed on a tile press which shapes the tile and applies the factory logo. Any extra clay is removed by hand and usually reused It is fired in a kiln, and the density of the clay tile is a function of the length of time and temperature at which it is heated.

Clay tiles are often white, yellow, orange or brown in color. However, they can be colored or styled according to one’s preference by spraying a glaze or engobe before firing in the kiln. The extreme heat of the kiln permanently bonds the color to the tile, ensuring the color does not peel or fade away over time. Once fired and glazed, it is ready, and is stored for transport/shipping.

== Trade, commerce and geographical spread ==
Tiles are exported to East Asia, Europe, Australia, Africa, and the Middle East. This tile is exquisitely used for roof tiling along Malabar Coast and Konkan Coast of India.

At helm of the industry the production of Mangalore tiles was prominent in South Canara, Malabar District along Chaliyar and Quilon along Ithikkara River.

In 2026, restrictions on clay extraction threatened Mangalore tile production.

== See also ==
- Basel Mission
- Marseille
- Monk and Nun

== Notes ==
A different type of J H MORGAN roof tile found in Old Suriyani church at Chenganoor which is much older than the photos shown in the photo.
