= St. Lawrence Shrine Basilica =

St. Lawrence Minor Basilica
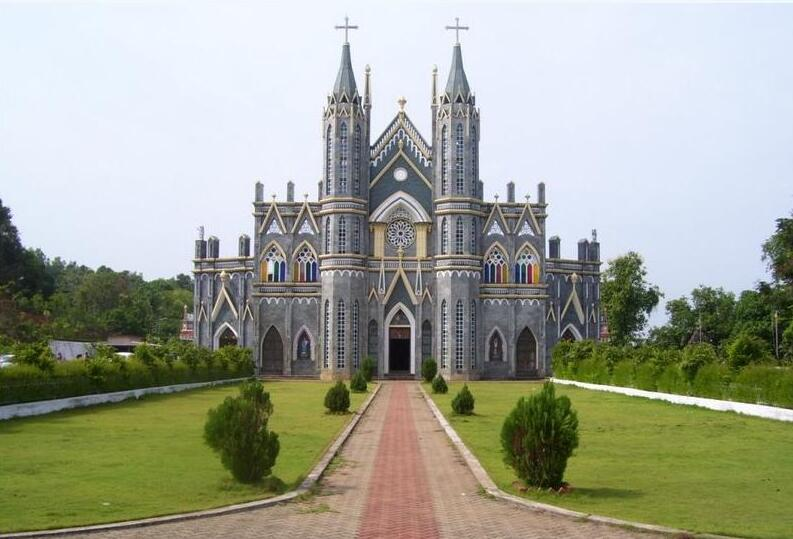
- St. Lawrence Basilica in Attur, Karkala

- St. Lawrence Minor Basilica in Karnataka Map
- 13°12′21.3516″N 74°58′19.4016″E
- Location: Attur, Karkala, Karnataka
- Country: India
- Denomination: Roman Catholic
- Website: www.stlawrenceattur.org

History
- Status: Minor Basilica
- Founded: 1759
- Dedication: Saint Lawrence
- Consecrated: 22 January 1901

Architecture
- Functional status: Active
- Style: Inspired by Gothic

Administration
- District: Udupi
- Province: Bangalore
- Diocese: Roman Catholic Diocese of Udupi

Clergy
- Archbishop: Peter Machado
- Bishop: Gerald Isaac Lobo
- Rector: Alban Dsouza

St. Lawrence Shrine Basilica or Attur Basilica (Portuguese: São Lourenço de Carcoal, English: St. Lawrence of Karkala) is a Roman Catholic church in Karkala, India. It was built in 1759 and is purported to be the site of many miracles. It is by characterized its Attur Jatre or Attur Festival.

Attur Church is situated on the outskirts of Karkala in the Karnataka state of India. It is situated 58 km from Mangalore.

Placed amidst placid greenery, the Attur-Karkala parish has a rich history. The church oversees a school and an orphanage.

== Saint ==
Born in the 3rd century, St. Lawrence, believed to be a Spaniard, was an extraordinarily virtuous young man. This quality came to the notice of the future Pope Sixtus II, then the archdeacon of Rome. Under the tutelage of Sixtus, Lawrence studied the holy scriptures, and the maxims of Christian perfection.

Sixtus was raised to the pontificate in 257, he ordained Lawrence deacon and appointed him the first among the seven deacons who served in the Roman Church. Lawrence thus became the Pope's Archdeacon. This was a charge of great trust, to which was annexed the care of the treasury and riches of the Church, and the distribution of its revenues among the poor.

The Emperor Valerian, through the persuasion of Marcian, in 257, published his bloody edicts against the Church. His intention was the destruction of the Church. He commanded all bishops, priests, and deacons to be put to death without delay. The following year, in compliance to his orders, Pope Sixtus II was apprehended. When Lawrence beheld him going to martyrdom, he too was inflamed with a desire to die for Christ and expressed his yearning. The Holy Pope promised him that he too would follow him in a few days but having faced a greater trial crowned with a more glorious victory. He ordered Lawrence to distribute immediately among the poor, the treasures of the Church, which were committed to his care. Lawrence set out in haste to carry out the order. He distributed all the money to the poor widows and orphans. He even sold the sacred vessels to increase the sum.

The Prefect of Rome was informed of the riches of the Church, and imagining that the Christians had hidden considerable treasures, he was extremely desirous to secure them. He ordered Lawrence to reveal all the treasures to him. Lawrence asked for a little time to present to him the treasures of the Church. The Prefect granted him three days. Lawrence went all over the city, seeking out in every street the poor who were supported by the church. On the third day, he gathered together a great number of them before the Church and placed them in rows, the decrepit, the blind, the lame, the maimed, the lepers, orphans, widows, and virgins. He invited the Prefect to come and see the treasures of the Church and conducted him to the place. The Prefect was furious at the sight and threatened Lawrence against such action and asked him to show him the treasures according to his promise. Lawrence explained to him that they were the real riches of the Church. The materialistic Prefect was only insulted and in his rage ordered Lawrence to be put to death in a slow and torturous manner.

He ordered a great gridiron to be made ready. Lawrence was stripped, extended, and bound with chains upon the gridiron over a slow fire. He was broiled little by little. His face appeared beautiful, radiating extraordinary light. Great must have been the tranquility which he enjoyed even when he was being subjected to the torture. He only prayed for the conversion of the city of Rome and lifted his eyes up towards heaven and died. Several senators, who were present at his death, were so powerfully moved by his tender piety and his indifference towards the torture inflicted on him, that they became Christians on the spot. These noblemen took up the martyr's body on their shoulders, and gave it an honourable burial in the Veran field, near the road to Tibur, on 10 August 258.

== The Shrine ==
St. Lawrence of Attur is known for his astonishing power of intercession with God. Over the past years the patronage of St. Lawrence over Attur has been remarkable. Not only the residents of Karkala and the pilgrims flocking there in great numbers, but also devotees who invoke St. Lawrence of Attur without visiting the shrine have experienced his powerful intercession. The number of pilgrims to the place throughout the year and specially those during the feast days in the month of January is an evident proof that St. Lawrence does not disappoint those who come to him in faith and devotion.

.

== Continuing Tradition ==
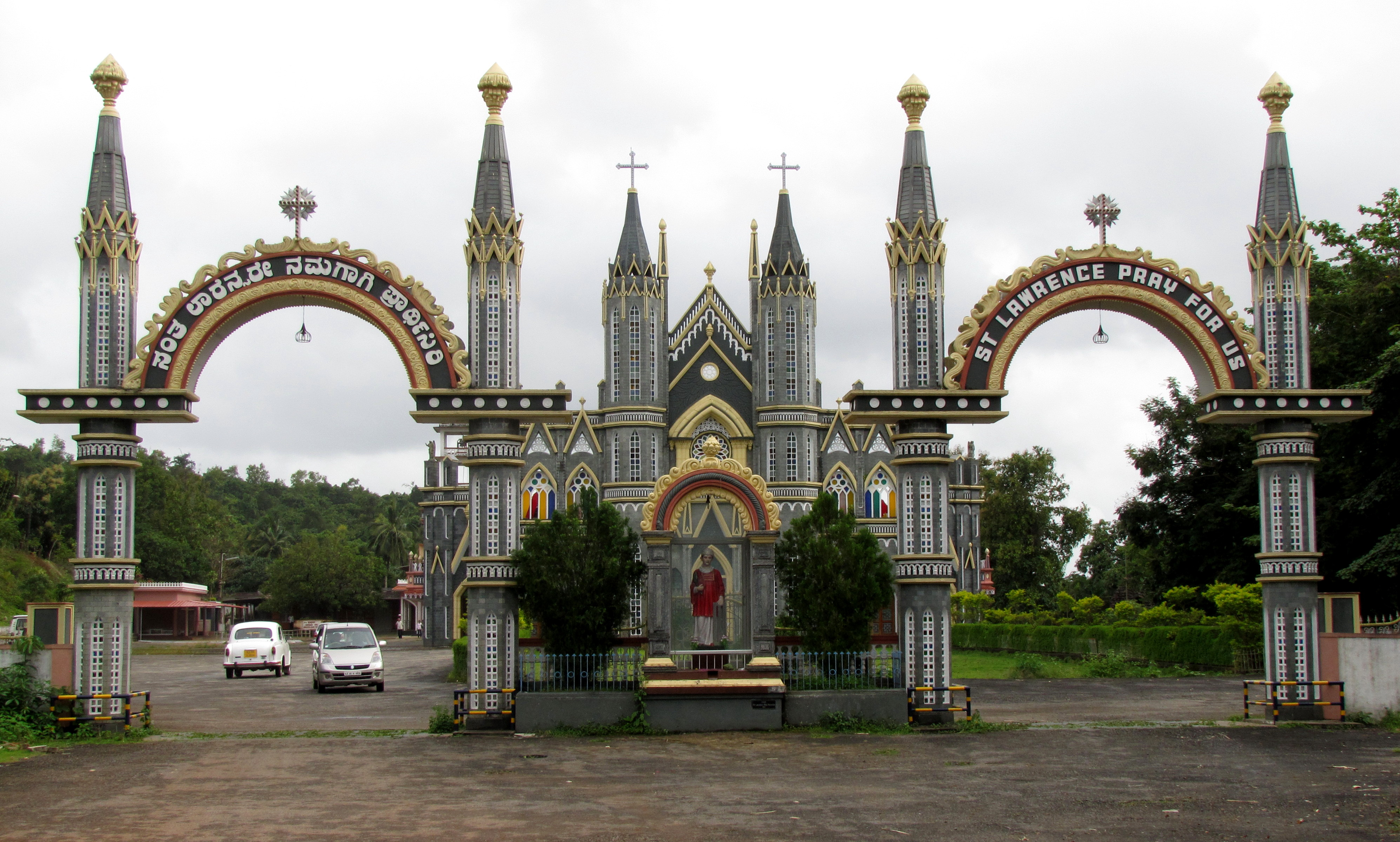
The twin gates of the church

Fr. Alban Dsouza took charge as the rector of the St Lawrence Minor Basilica, Attur on 6 July 2021.

== Faith and belief ==
This church being widely acclaimed as having the power to intercede with God, attracts not only the residents of Udupi District but also pilgrims from all parts of India.

== Shrine elevated to Minor Basilica ==
Pope Francis had elevated the shrine of Saint Lawrence at Attur – Karkala to the status of a Minor basilica on April 26, 2016. St Lawrence Shrine is the 22nd basilica in India and the second in Karnataka, with St. Mary's Basilica, Bangalore being the first.

The Proclamation and Dedication of the St. Lawrence Shrine Attur, Karkala as Minor basilica was held in a grand manner on 1 August 2016, the Proclamation and Dedication of the shrine as Minor Basilica took place during the mass. Three Cardinals, 40 Bishops and more than 300 priests and nuns along with 15,000 devotees witnessed the historical occasion.

The Eucharistic celebration began at 10 a.m. with the procession of priests followed by bishops and cardinals. In his introductory remarks, Cardinal Oswald Gracias, Archbishop of Mumbai, the chief celebrant of the Holy Eucharist, said that the elevation of the shrine of St. Lawrence to a Minor Basilica was an honor not only for Udupi Diocese but also to the State and the country. St. Lawrence, who was regarded as the “saint of miracles,” would shower his blessings on his devotees, he said.

Then, Cardinal Baselios Cleemis, Major Archbishop-Catholicos of the Syro Malankara Catholic Church, Thiruvananthapuram, read the Proclamation Decree in Latin language. Gerald Isaac Lobo, Bishop of Udupi Diocese, read the same Decree in Konkani. After the Proclamation, the choir sang the “Gloria” hymn.

Dr Bernard Moras in his homily said that this was a historical event and expressed gratitude to God for making Saint Lawrence Shrine a Minor Basilica. "This event will be written in the golden annals of the history of the diocese of Udupi," he said. Explaining the significance of a Minor Basilica, he said, "Basilica means a beautiful and royal house. In Christianity, the term basilica was used by early Christians who celebrated the holy Mass in the royal house of the kings. There are 1,742 Minor Basilicas in the world, out of which 21 are in India. This is the 22nd Minor Basilica in the country and the 2nd in the state after St. Mary's Basilica, Bangalore.

"Basilica is a place of divine worship. St Lawrence died in AD 257, he sacrificed himself showing his love towards God. He spent his life in the service of the poor and the needy. God is merciful. This is a place of worship, where people from different places come with intentions and witness miracles in their lives," he added.

== Demographics ==
The parish has 428 families with a population of 1799 members. Total 10 wards are present in this parish.

== Parish Priests served in this Parish ==
As per available records the following priests have rendered their valuable service and served the people of this Shrine:

- 1786-1801 : No written record is available for this period. Possibly due to the atrocity during the rule of Tippu Sultan no priest was appointed to serve the people.

No.	List of Parish Priests	Year
1.	Fr. Francisco Salvador Lobo	1759 - 1775
2.	Fr. Sebastião M. de Crasto	1775 - 1777
3.	Fr. Custódio C. Nazaré	1777 - 1781
4.	Fr. Aleixo Rodrigues	1781 – 1801
5.	Fr. V. Rodrigues	1801 - 1808
6.	Fr. C. Silva	1808 - 1810
7.	Fr. A. S. D. Veri Tako Silva	1810-1818
8.	Fr. Serrão	1818-1823
9.	Fr. C. Furtado	1823-1830
10.	Fr. P. J. Ribeiro	1830
11.	Fr. P. Noronha	1830-1834
12.	Fr. H. R. Souza	1834-1845
13.	Fr. Sereio	1845
14.	Fr. Lawrence Fernandes	
15.	Fr. Joseph Michael Rebello	1856 - 1858
16.	Fr. Augustine José Jacob Doris Gonçalves	1855 - 1868
17.	Fr. John Cross	1868
18.	Fr. A. Fernandes	1870 - 1881
19.	Fr. Frank S. Pereira	1881 - 1904
20.	Fr. Jacob Sequeira	1904 - 1914
21.	Fr. Alphonsus Maria de Liguori Vaz	1914 - 1922
22.	Fr. Salvador D’Souza	1922 - 1948
23.	Fr. A. J. D’Silva	1948 - 1952
24.	Fr. Pascoal Lobo	1952 - 1953
25.	Fr. Francis D’Souza	1953 - 1957
26.	Fr. William Lewis	1957 - 1959
27.	Fr. Valerian B. Colaço	1959 - 1970
28.	Fr. F.P.S. Monis	1970 - 1978
29.	Fr. Robert Z. D’Souza	1978 - 1986
30.	Fr. Jose M. Menezes	1986 - 1992
31.	Fr. Robert Crasta	1992 - 1993
32.	Fr. Joswey Fernandes	1993 – 2001
33.	Fr. Francis Cornelio	2001 – 2006
34.	Fr. Arthur Pereira	2006 - 2013
35.	Fr. George D’Souza	2013 – 2021
36.	Fr. Alban D’Souza	06.07.2021–Present

== See also ==
- Roman Catholicism in Mangalore
- Goan Catholics
- Roman Catholic Diocese of Udupi
- Roman Catholic Archdiocese of Bangalore
- Our Lady of Lourdes Church, Kanajar, Karkala
