= Participation of Mangalorean Catholics in the Indian Independence Movement =

Participation of Mangalorean Catholics in the Indian Independence Movement recounts the community's role in the Indian Independence Movement.

== Community ==
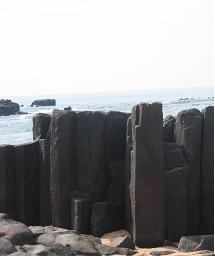
St Mary's Islands in South Canara, where the Portuguese explorer Vasco Da Gama landed in 1498

The Roman Catholics from the South Canara district on the south-western coast of India, under the jurisdiction of the Mangalore Diocese, are generally known as Mangalorean Catholics. They are Konkani people and speak the Konkani language.

All records of an early existence of Christians in South Canara were lost at the time of their deportation by Tippu Sultan in 1784. Hence, it is not known when exactly Christianity was introduced in South Canara, although it is possible that Syrian Christians settled in South Canara just as they did in Malabar, a region south of Canara. The Italian traveler Marco Polo recorded that there were considerable trading activities between the Red Sea and the Canara coast in the 13th century. It can be surmised that foreign Christian merchants were visiting the coastal towns of South Canara during that period for commerce and possibly some Christian priests might have accompanied them for evangelistic work. In 1321, the French Dominican friar Jordanus Catalani of Severac (in south-western France) had arrived in Bhatkal in North Canara. According to Mangalorean historian Severine Silva, the author of History of Christianity in Canara (1961), no concrete evidence has yet been found that there were any permanent settlements of Christians in South Canara before the 16th century. It was only after the advent of the Portuguese in the region that Christianity began to be propagated. In 1498, the Portuguese explorer Vasco Da Gama landed on St Mary's Islands in South Canara on his voyage from Portugal to India, and planted a cross there. In 1500, Pedro Álvares Cabral, a Portuguese explorer, arrived at Anjediva in North Canara with eight Franciscan missionaries. These missionaries under the leadership of Henrique Soares de Coimbra converted 22 or 23 natives to Christianity in the Mangalore region. In 1526, under the viceroyship of Lopo Vaz de Sampaio, the Portuguese took possession of Mangalore. The Portuguese Franciscans slowly started propagating Christianity in Mangalore

Contemporary Mangalorean Catholics are, however, descended mainly from the Goan Catholic settlers, who had migrated to Canara from Goa, a state north of Canara, between 1560 and 1763, in two major waves. The first wave occurred during the Goa Inquisition of 1560, to escape the trials of the Inquisition. These migrants were welcomed by the native Bednore rulers of Canara for their agricultural skills. The second major wave occurred during the Portuguese-Maratha wars in Goa during the late 17th and the early 18th century. According to Mangalorean historian Alan Machado Prabhu, the author of Sarasvati's Children: A History of the Mangalorean Christians (1999), the Mangalorean Catholics numbered about 58,000 by 1765, during the capture of Canara by Hyder Ali.

== Background ==
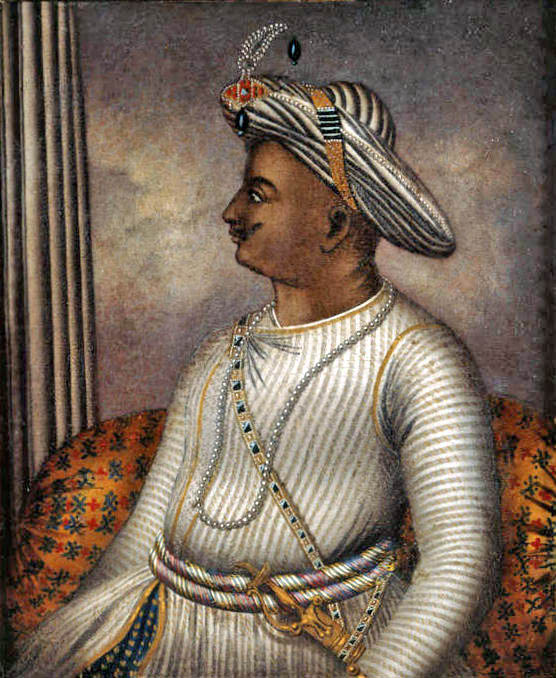
Tipu Sultan, imposed the Captivity of Mangalorean Catholics at Seringapatam. The Mangalorean Catholics were later freed after the British killed Tippu Sultan.

The commencement of British rule in Canara, following the defeat of Tippu Sultan in 1799, was a matter of joy for the Canara Catholics because it meant liberation of their brethren from 15 years of captivity in Srirangapatnam. Tippu had razed down churches in Canara and confiscated the properties and wealth of Canara Catholics in a massive military operation on Ash Wednesday in 1774. A century later, Jerome Saldanha, a government servant during the British Raj at the Bombay Presidency, noted in an article in Mangalore Magazine, published by St. Aloysius College, which chronicled contemporary developments and views from the closing decades of the 19th century:

"People of all classes belonging to Canara, specially the Christians, had suffered so dreadfully from Tippu's regime of terror that they welcomed the British with a sense of relief and joy, and a hope of future peace and prosperity, that perhaps nowhere else was felt in India on the advent of the British. Nor were our ancestors disappointed, for they found that the main object of British rule in India was to secure the happiness of the people over whom it was held".

== Role ==
Following retirement from government service in Bombay, Jerome Saldanha returned to Mangalore and represented the District in the Madras Legislative Council. In his later years, he began to move with the rising tide of nationalism and became a sincere admirer of Mahatma Gandhi. When Gandhiji visited Mangalore in 1927, Jerome, as President of South Canara District Congress Committee, presided at the public meeting addressed by the Mahatma.

According to Dr. Michael Lobo, who has chronicled the community through two authoritative books, The Mangalore Catholic Community – A Professional History / Directory and Distinguished Mangalorean Catholics 1800–2000, a photograph of the two leaders taken on the occasion is in the possession of his family. However, Jerome was born in 1868, one year before the Mahatma, and died in 1947, just a few months before Independence.

Though not an active freedom fighter, Jerome supported the freedom movement through articulation in writing, specially in Mangalore Magazine. For instance, during World War II, in 1942, the Japanese joined the Axis (Germany and Italy) and after capturing Singapore and Burma, were threatening to break through the eastern border of India. In this context, the moderates among Mangalorean Catholics felt that this was hardly the time for Gandhiji to persist in the Quit India Movement. For, they reasoned, if the Japanese succeeded in taking over India, the position of the country would be infinitely worse off and prospects of freedom might vanish altogether. Instead, they argued, this was the time for Britain and India to stand together in the defense of the sub-continent.

One of those who held this view was an eminent lawyer, Cajetan Lobo who, writing in Mangalore Magazine, went to the extent of insinuating that Gandhiji was, in the context of the war, a fifth columnist. Jerome was quick to rise to the defense of Gandhiji:

"It is sheer nonsense to talk of Gandhiji as a fifth columnist…. He is one of the great men of the world—dominated by high ideals …about human family. Whether those ideals are always practicable in our difficult world may be questioned, but that Mr. Gandhi is a great patriot, a great man and a great spiritual leader, who can doubt?"

Another supporter of the freedom movement was Maurice Salvador Sreshta, a government servant under British Raj, who retired as Postmaster General of Ceylon. Following retirement, he was elected to the Madras Legislative Council.

As Dr. Michael Lobo notes, " Throughout his career, he wished to be identified as Indian and he adopted the surname Sreshta (from a Sanskrit word meaning great ) – a daring move for a British civil servant at a time when the other civil servants were, if anything, attempting to anglicize their names." His children were also provided with Indian names in addition to their Christian names. Shortly after returning to Mangalore from Colombo, in 1928, he spoke to students of St. Aloysius College, commending Gandhiji to them.

Yet another Canara Catholic supporter of the freedom movement was Felix Albuquerque Pai, magnate of the Albuquerque tile factory in Mangalore. Inspired by Gandhiji, he had manufactured salt in defiance of British law (1930). When Jawaharlal Nehru came to Mangalore in 1933, he first landed at the Albuquerque residence at Bolar and was taken in procession to Falnir where a public meeting was held – the reception being financed by Felix Pai.

According to the account by Dr. Michael Lobo, the 1930s saw the entry of three Canara couples into the freedom movement – Thomas and Helen Alvares, Cyprian and Alice Alvares and Joachim and Violet Alva. The involvement of the last couple is a long story, well known to merit repeating. Suffice to say that they were the first couple to be members of Parliament and Violet Alva ended up as the Deputy Chairperson of Rajya Sabha. For their wedding in Bombay on 18 July 1936, Gandhiji, though bedridden, sent a message to the couple hoping that the union would result in greater service to the country. He also expressed his joy that " Nothing unseemly as dancing and drinking would have part in the wedding festivities".

Thomas and Helen Alvares had settled down in Colombo where they opened a branch of their tile business. The couple were converted to the cause of freedom by the Mahatma himself, whom they once entertained to tea. So impressed were they by the Mahatma that they decided to give their children Indian first names. Helen herself adopted the name of Alva Devi. She was a great votary of Satyagraha and articulated it through public speeches.

The third couple was Cyprian and Alice Alvares. Cyprian was arrested in 1930 during Wadala Salt Satyagraha and was one of the few freedom fighters of the Mangalorean Catholic community to receive Sanman Patra in the 1930s. His wife, Alice, joined Quit India Movement with her husband and went underground. But both were arrested in November 1942 and put in separate lock-ups in Bombay. Alice escaped and went to Daman and worked with the underground leaders – Lohia and Savarkar – while Cyprian was an ailing prisoner. Alice was arrested again and was first interned in the Yerwada Central Jail in Pune and later expelled from Bombay and interned in Central Jail, Mangalore. The couple operated a wireless system for Congress Radio from their own school.

John Francis Pinto, a Bombay-based Mangalorean Catholic businessman (proprietor of Pintos Coffee), who was preoccupied in politics, earlier as a freedom fighter (later his Nephew Frederick Michael Pinto became a MLA), became an admirer of Gandhiji soon after the latter took the lead in the freedom struggle in the early 1920s. Because of his admiration for Gandhi, his donning the Gandhi-cap and his active participation in the Civil Disobedience Movement in the 1930s, he acquired the nickname as " Gandhi Pinto".
