= Monti Fest =

Konkani Catholic feast

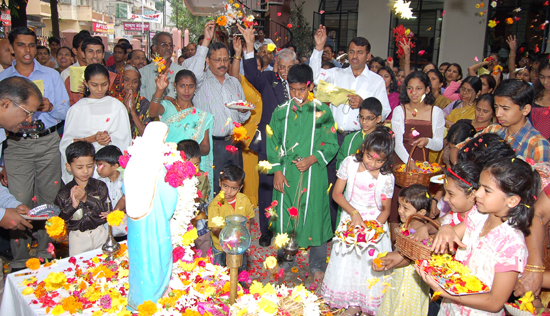
A Monti Fest celebration by Mangalorean Catholics in Poona (Pune), Maharashtra

Monti Fest is a Catholic Christian festival held on the 8th of September every year, by the Latin Christian community of Konkani people, originating in the Konkan region of India & the Konkani Christian migrants in the Canara sub-region of Carnataca, India. This festival celebrates the Nativity of the Blessed Virgin Mary.

For the Mangalorean Christians the feast day includes the blessing of novem (new crops), it is also marked by novem jevan (vegetarian meals) & because it is also a harvest festival for Mangalorean Christians. In certain Goan Catholic dialects the festival's name is corrupted to "Moti Fest".

According to the Konkani scholar, Pratap Naik, the festival derives its name from the Capela de Nossa Senhora do Monte (Portuguese for "Chapel of Our Lady of the Mount") in Old Goa. The chapel was constructed in 1519 on a hillock commanding a view of the Mandovi River on the orders of Afonso de Albuquerque in honour of Our Lady. The feast day on 8 September, called Monti Saibinnichem Fest (Konkani for "Feast of the Lady of the Mount"), was instituted in the sixteenth century and continues to this day. Flowers and garlands are an integral part of the celebration, leading to the Konkani epithet Fulanchem Fest (Feast of flowers).

Naik observes the following: Shaivite Konkani people of those days celebrated the festival associated with Gowri Habba and Ganesh Chaturthi. According to the Hindu calendar, Bhadrapad month commences after Shravan month. On the fourth day of Bhadrapad comes Ganesh Chaturthi. For this feast all members of the Konkani Hindu family gather and celebrate from one-and-half to ten days. During this festive period Ganesha's idol is installed in the house and flowers are offered to it daily. On one day during this festive period new corn is ceremoniously partaken. The Christianisation of Goa led to the mass conversion of Hindus from Ilhas de Goa (Tiswadi), Jesuits taught the converts to give votive offerings of flowers to honour Monti Saibinn (the Lady of the Mount) instead. Thus, the Nativity feast which is celebrated by most Christians all over the world on 8 September, came to be called Monti Saibinichem Fest (the Feast of the Lady of the Mount) for Konkani Christians.

Thanks to the initiative taken by Joachim Miranda, Monti Fest celebrations were renewed at Monte Mariano Church, Farangipet, Mangalore in 1799, after a 15-year-long intermission due to the Captivity of Mangalorean Catholics at Seringapatam which ended with the Siege of Seringapatam (1799). Miranda was a Goan posted in Mangalore at the time, and would have been familiar with the festal celebration in Goa. Thus, Goa is said to be the original host of Monti Fest. Though Tippu Sultan destroyed the churches, seminaries & convents of Canara; he spared the Monte Mariano Church at Farangipet in deference to the friendship of his father Hyder Ali with Miranda. The Bandra Fest, celebrated by the Bombay East Indian Catholics, is a similar grand affair & coincides annually with Monti Fest.
