= Our Lady of Lourdes Church, Kanajar =

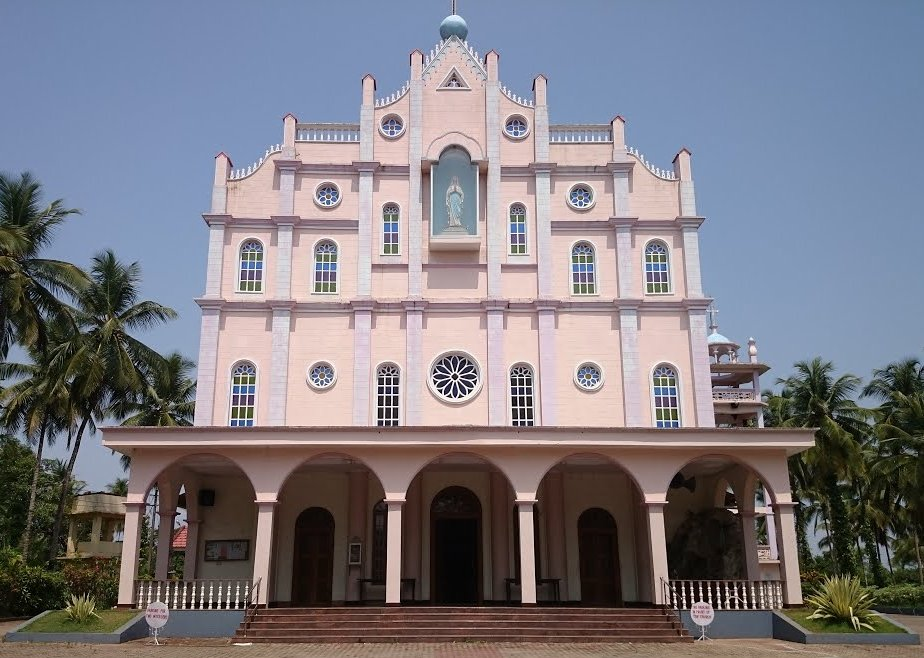
- Our Lady of Lourdes Church, Kanajar

- Location in Karnataka
- 13.2723°N 74.8960°E
- Location: Kanajar, Karkala Taluk, Udupi District, Karnataka
- Denomination: Roman Catholic (Latin rite)
- Website: lourdes.kanajar.com

History
- Founded: 24 July 1938
- Founder: Rev. Fr. William Antony Lewis

Administration
- District: Udupi District
- Province: Roman Catholic Archdiocese of Bangalore
- Archdiocese: Roman Catholic Archdiocese of Bangalore
- Diocese: Roman Catholic Diocese of Udupi
- Deanery: Karkala - St Philip Deanery

Clergy
- Archbishop: Peter Machado
- Bishop: Gerald I Lobo
- Priest: Harold Pereira

Our Lady of Lourdes Church is a historic Roman Catholic Church dedicated to Our Lady of Lourdes situated at Kanajar near Karkala, India. The church was built in 1938. This church comes under Deanery of Karkala, Roman Catholic Diocese of Udupi.

== Demographics ==
The parish has 395 families with a population of 1117 members.

== See also ==
- Roman Catholicism in Udupi
