= Kanajaru =

- Town
- Location in Karnataka, India Kanajaru (India)
- Coordinates: 13°16′24″N 74°53′51″E
- Country: India
- State: Karnataka
- District: Udupi

Government
  - Body: Kanajar - Neere Grama Panchayat

Languages
  - Official: Kannada
- Time zone: UTC+5:30 (IST)
- PIN: 574102
- Telephone code: 91-8258
- Vehicle registration: KA-20
- Nearest city: Udupi, Manipal, Karkala, Mangalore
- Lok Sabha constituency: Udupi Chikmagalur (Lok Sabha constituency)
- Vidhan Sabha constituency: Karkala
- Civic agency: Kanajar - Neere Grama Panchayat
- Climate: Tropical monsoon rain forest (Köppen)
- Avg. summer temperature: 35 °C (95 °F)
- Avg. winter temperature: 20 °C (68 °F)
- Website: kanajaronline.com

Kanajaru or Kanajar is a small village approximately 78 km north of Mangalore, 18 km west of Karkala and 33 km east of Udupi. Kanajaru is part of Karkala Taluk in Udupi District, Karnataka, India.

== Notable locations ==
Our Lady of Lourdes Church, Kanajar is a Roman Catholic Church dedicated to Our Lady of Lourdes. Kanajar Church is surrounded by Moodubelle, Nakre, Hirgan, Manipal and Karkal parishes.

Little Flower English Medium School, Ranganapalke is run by Glarida Education Trust.

Lourdes Hospital was inaugurated on 11 February 2003.

Kanajaru Sauharda Bhavan was inaugurated and Aloysius Paul D'Souza, Bishop of Mangalore on 18 April 2009.

== Culture ==
Most of the popular Indian festivals are celebrated in Kanajaru, the most important being Christmas, Diwali, Easter, Eid, and Ganesh Chaturthi.

Kanajaru Church celebrates annual festival in the first week of December and parish titular feast is celebrated on 11 February.

Brahmalingeshwara temple Kanajaru celebrates annual festivities (utsava) in the last week of December every year.

== Economy ==
The economy of Kanajaru is mainly due to coconut tree plantation and products of coconut, rice production, jasmine flowers and workers who earn daily wages. However to a large extent the economy is also supported by the large number of expatriates who are working abroad, especially Gulf region in the Middle East. Kanajaru is fast producing young adults with higher educational degrees. The remittance of the Kanajaru residents working abroad is the main source for the prosperity in the region.

== See also ==
- Roman Catholic Diocese of Udupi
