= Monte Mariano Church =

Coordinates: 12°52′22″N 74°57′16″E

Monte Mariano Church at Farangipet in Mangalore, India, is a church where the Roman Catholic festival Monti Fest was initiated by Joachim Miranda, a Goan Catholic priest at Farangipet in 1763.

== History ==
The church was built by the Portuguese in 1568 and was then part of the erstwhile South Canara district. It was mentioned by the Italian traveller Pietro Della Valle, who visited Mangalore in 1623, referring to is as the Church of St. Francis of Assisi.

Monte Mariano (Mount of Mary) is the official name for the place. Monti Saibinnichem Fest (Feast of Our Lady of the Mount), colloquially called Monti fest, derives its name, from the Monte. Fr. Joachim Miranda, started the annual new harvest festival. The fiesta is celebrated every year on 8th September—The Feast of the Nativity of Mary. The statue of Maria bambina (Infant Mary) in the chapel was brought by a family in Nelyadi-Kerala from Italy. Though Tippu Sultan destroyed the churches of Canara, he spared Monte Mariano Church in deference to the friendship of his father Hyder Ali with Father Miranda. The Church is situated on the banks of River Nethravathi.

== Services ==
There is a regular English Mass at 6 a.m. and Sunday Konkani Mass at 8 a.m.
