= Farangipet =

Farangipete
- Interactive map of Farangipete
- Coordinates: 12°52′28″N 74°57′25″E

Farangipet or Farangipete is a locality in Bantwal taluk, Dakshina Kannada district near Bantwala town, Karnataka, India.

The ancient, first church, Monte Mariano Church, is located in Farangipet. It also has a temple and mosque nearby. Farangipet is a fast-growing town and it is between two main cities, namely Mangalore and B.C Road.

Farangipet comes under Pudu Gram Panchayat. Farangipet is famous for fish cuisines.

The Farangipet Railway Station under the South Western Railway is on the outskirts of Mangalore and is located north of NH75.
