= Georg Plebst =

Georg Plebst (1823-1888) was a German missionary who arrived India in 1851 and established one of the first tile making factories known as The Common Wealth Trust Ltd or locally addressed as Basel Mission tile factory in 1860, after they found large deposits of clay by the banks of the Gurupura and Nethravathi rivers. It was located near Morgan's Gate on the banks of the river Nethravathi. He left India in 1868.
