= Richard Crasta =

Indian writer

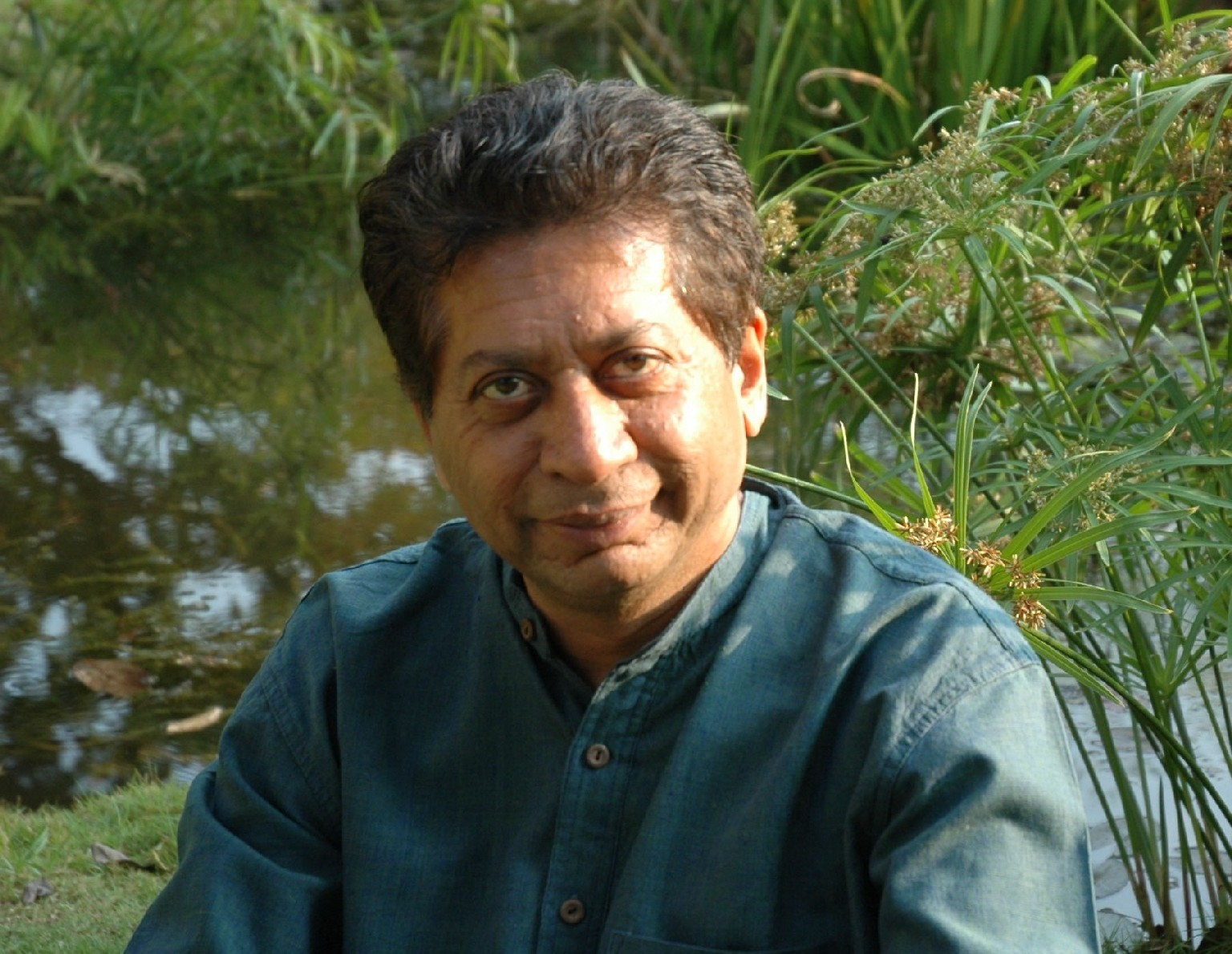
- Born: 1952 (age 73–74); Bangalore, India
- Occupation: Writer
- Writing career
- Genres: Fiction, non-fiction
- Website: richardcrasta.com

Richard Crasta (Konkani: रीचर्ड क्रास्ता (Devanagari)) is an Indian American writer and novelist.

He grew up in Mangalore, lived in the United States for twenty years, mostly in the New York metropolitan area, and now spends much of his time in Asia. His works include the comic and frankly sexual coming of age novel, The Revised Kama Sutra (published in seven languages and ten countries to date), and fiction and nonfiction books such as Impressing the Whites: The New International Slavery; Beauty Queens, Children and the Death of Sex; the semi-fictional What We All Need; and The Killing of an Author.

== Early life and education ==
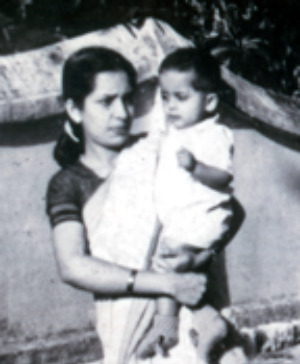
A one-year-old Richard Crasta being held by his mother, Christine

Richard Crasta, son of the late John Baptist Crasta and Christine Crasta (née D'Souza), was born in Bangalore, India. He had two brothers and a sister. His father John, son of Alex and Nathalia Crasta, originally hailed from Kinnigoli in South Canara district, about 20 miles from Mangalore. John was a World War II veteran and prisoner-of-war who survived a Japanese prison camp, and his war memoir was published by his son under the title, "Eaten by the Japanese: The Memoir of an Unknown Indian Prisoner of War."

Richard had a strict middle-class Catholic upbringing and grew up in Mangalore in the 1960s and early 1970s. He began writing when he was ten.

An important factor in his development was the church and the convent school to which he was sent as a boy, and the secondary school of his adolescence.

He completed his Bachelor of Arts (BA) in Economics, History and Political Science from the University of Mysore in 1972. He was eventually accepted into the Indian Administrative Service (IAS), through which he became the Assistant Commissioner and Sub-Divisional Magistrate of Chickballapur Subdivision in Kolar district and Belgaum Subdivision in Belgaum district.

Later, he became Special Deputy Commissioner of Shimoga district. He later served in the IAS for four years. Crasta traveled to the United States in 1979, enrolling in the American University in Washington, D.C.

He worked for a New York literary agency and taught English at a New York college through 1981, and completed his Master of Arts (MA) degree in Literature and Communication. He received his Master of Fine Arts (MFA) degree in Creative Writing from Columbia University in 1987.

== Career ==
Crasta began his novel The Revised Kamasutra: A Novel of Colonialism and Desire while taking courses at Columbia University. After more than eight years of work, The Revised Kamasutra appeared in India in 1993. Subsequent editions appeared in Britain, the United States, Germany, Italy, and a few other countries.

A collection of humorous, political, personal, and satirical essays titled Beauty Queens, Children and the Death of Sex, appeared in India in 1997. Crasta edited and contributed to essays Eaten by the Japanese: The Memoirs of an Unknown Indian Soldier, by John Baptist Crasta, his father, in India in 1998. In the 1998 U.S. edition, and in one or two European translations of his novel, he used the name Avatar Prabhu, reverting to Richard Crasta in 2000.

In 2000, he published Impressing the Whites. Five years later, he published two other books, What We All Need, entirely his own, and Fathers, Rebels and Dreamers, compiled with two of his Mangalorean friends Arunachalam Kumar, conservationist, and Ralph Nazareth, poet and professor. In 2008, he published The Killing of an Author, a literary and publishing autobiography and critique of the publishing industry.

== Philosophical views ==
Ideologically, Crasta describes himself as "a profound, all-round sceptic whose religion is literature, laughter, and love".

== Works ==
Charity, forgiveness, redemption – all these have stayed with me though I'm no church-goer. I like this essence of Christianity that is not there in George Bush.

— Richard Crasta in an interview to The Hindu

- The Revised Kamasutra: A Novel of Colonialism and Desire (1993)
- Beauty Queens, Children and the Death of Sex (1997)
- Impressing the Whites: The New International Slavery (2000)
- One little Indian (2003)
- What We All Need: An Anti-Terrorist Book of Incompletions, Unsafe Love, and Writing While Brown (2005)
- Fathers, Rebels and Dreamers (editor and co-author, along with Ralph Nazareth and Arunachalam Kumar) (2005)
- The Killing of an Author: Jackie Kennedy, Sonny Pfizer, Seven Little Ayatollahs and a Suicide Pact (2008)
- I Will NOT Go the F**k to Sleep (2011)
