= Basel Mission tile factory =

The Common Wealth Trust Ltd or locally referred to as Basel Mission tile factory run by the German missionary Plebot (Georg Plebst in reality), with an unnamed Indian master-potter, was the first Mangalore tile manufacturing factory to be set up in India in 1860 on banks of the Nethravathi river near Morgan's Gate, about 10 kilometres (6.2 mi) from the Ullal bridge.

== See also ==
- Codacal Tile Factory
