= Alvares tile factory =

Alvares tile factory is a Mangalore tile factory in Mangalore. The tiles produced by this factory were in great demand throughout the Indian subcontinent and East Africa.

== History ==
The firm was established in 1878 by Mr. Simon Alvares.
