= Morgan's Gate =

- Locality
- Location in Mangalore city, Karnataka, India
- Coordinates: 12.8493°N 74.8363°E
- Country: India
- State: Karnataka
- District: Dakshina Kannada
- City: Mangalore

Government
  - Body: Mangalore City Corporation

Morgan's Gate is a locality in Mangalore city of Karnataka state in India. It is situated around 4 km southeast to Hampankatta. It is known for the Basel Mission tile factory, founded in 1865. It is close to Mangaladevi Temple in Bolar. Mangalore Club, Mphasis and St. Rita's Church are the other landmarks in the area.

== Banks ==
- Canara bank

== NBFC's ==
- Manappuram Finance Ltd
