= Panemangalore, Karnataka =

Panemangalore Paner Panemanglur
- Suburb
- Location in Karnataka, India Panemangalore (India)
- Coordinates: 12.873°N 75.046°E
- Country: India
- State: Karnataka
- District: Dakshina Kannada
- Nearest city: Mangalore

Government
  - Body: Municipality

Languages
  - Official: Kannada
  - Regional: Tulu Konkani Beary
- Time zone: UTC+5:30 (IST)
- PIN: 574 231
- Telephone code: 08255
- ISO 3166 code: IN-KA
- Vehicle registration: KA-19, KA-70
- Website: karnataka.gov.in

Panemangalore is a locality on the banks of the Netravati River near BC Road. It lies in Bantwal taluk of Dakshina Kannada district. The National Highway 75 passes through this region. It is located 27 km east of Mangalore city. It lies in between BC Road and Melkar and forms a continuous urban area with them. They are also developing as the eastern suburbs of Mangalore.
