= Albuquerque tile factory =

Albuquerque Tile Factory is a tile manufacturing unit located in Hoige Bazaar, Bolar, Mangalore, Karnataka, India.

It is operated by the firm A. Albuquerque & Sons, which was established in 1868 by Alex Albuquerque Pai. The business has remained within the Albuquerque family and is currently managed by George Albuquerque Pai.
