= Maithreyi Karnoor =

Indian novelist (born 1983)

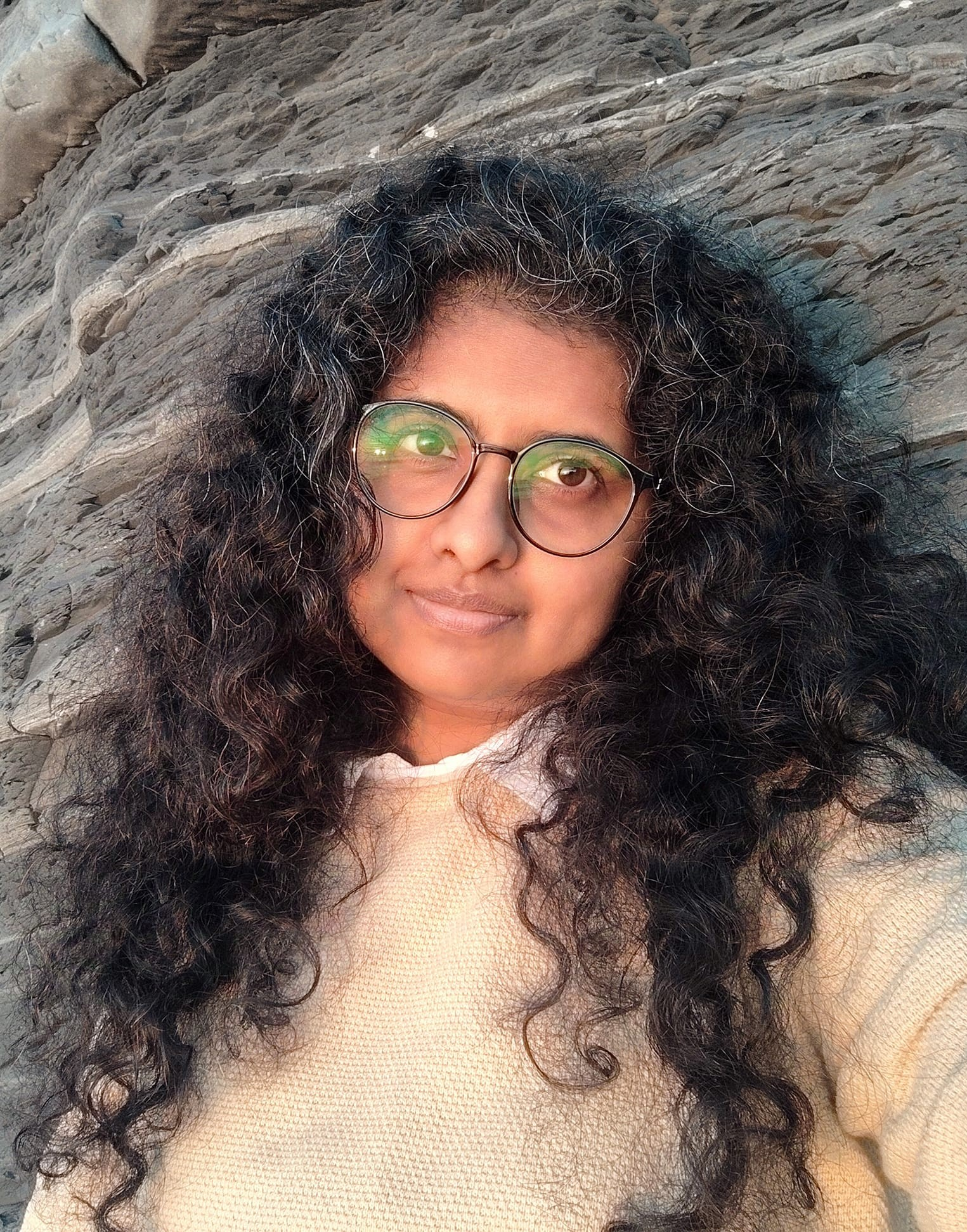
- Maithreyi Karnoor in Wales.
- Born: 1983 (age 42–43); Hubli, Karnataka, India.
- Occupations: Novelist, translator and poet
- Writing career
- Pen name: Maithreyi Hughes
- Language: English, Kannada

Maithreyi Karnoor (born 1983) is an Indian novelist, literary translator and poet writing in English and Kannada. She is the author of Sylvia: Distant Avuncular Ends, Hettavara Neralu, Gooday Nagar and Skinny Dipping in Tiger Country. Her translations, essays, book reviews and opinion pieces have appeared in Deccan Herald, The Hindu, The Indian Express, and The Wire, amongst others.

Her poetry is also published under the pen name Maithreyi Hughes.

== Career ==
=== Fiction and poetry ===
Karnoor has authored two English-language fiction works, Sylvia: Distant Avuncular Ends (2021) and the short story collection Gooday Nagar (2026), published by Tranquebar (Westland Books). Hettavara Neralu (Kannada: ಹೆತ್ತವರ ನೆರಳು; lit. "Parental Shadow") marks her debut in Kannada.

Her poems have appeared in The Poetry Review, PN Review, Poetry London, and Poetry Wales. Her debut poetry collection Skinny Dipping in Tiger Country (2026) is published in UK by Valley Press.

=== Translations ===
Karnoor's notable translations from Kannada to English include Shrinivas B. Vaidya's Halla Bantu Halla (under the name A Handful of Sesame) and Vasudhendra's Tejo-Tungabhadra.

She was one of the judges for Lucien Stryk Asian Translation Prize 2021. In the same year, she received 2021-22 Charles Wallace India Trust Fellowship in Creative Writing and Translation. Writing about translation, Karnoor put emphasis on the importance of practical translation experience coming before strict theoretical study.

== Reception ==
Critics noted the experimental nature of Sylvia, its merging of prose with poetry and attention to form and structure. Karnoor's lingual strengths of a translator are highlighted as being present in the novel. Gooday Nagar was positively received for its blend of the ordinary and surreal, its characterization drawing parallels to R.K. Narayan's Malgudi Days.

Longreads featured her short story Ringa Ringa Roses, published in Bombay Literary Magazine, among Ten Outstanding Stories to Read in 2023. In 2026, Elle named Gooday Nagar as one of the must-read books of the year.

== Awards ==
- Kuvempu Bhasha Bharti Award
- Montreal Poetry Prize Shortlist (twice, in 2017 and 2020)
- Lucien Stryk Asian Translation Prize Shortlist 2019
- PEN Presents Translation Prize Shortlist 2022

== Works ==
=== Written works ===
- Sylvia: Distant Avuncular Ends (2021; UK edition subsequently published under the name Sylvia in 2023)
- Hettavara Neralu (Kannada novel)
- Gooday Nagar (2026)

=== Poetry collection ===
- Skinny Dipping in Tiger Country (2026)

=== Translations ===
- A Handful of Sesame (translation of Halla Bantu Halla by Shrinivas B. Vaidya)
- Tejo-Tungabhadra (by Vasudhendra)
