= List of beaches in Karnataka =

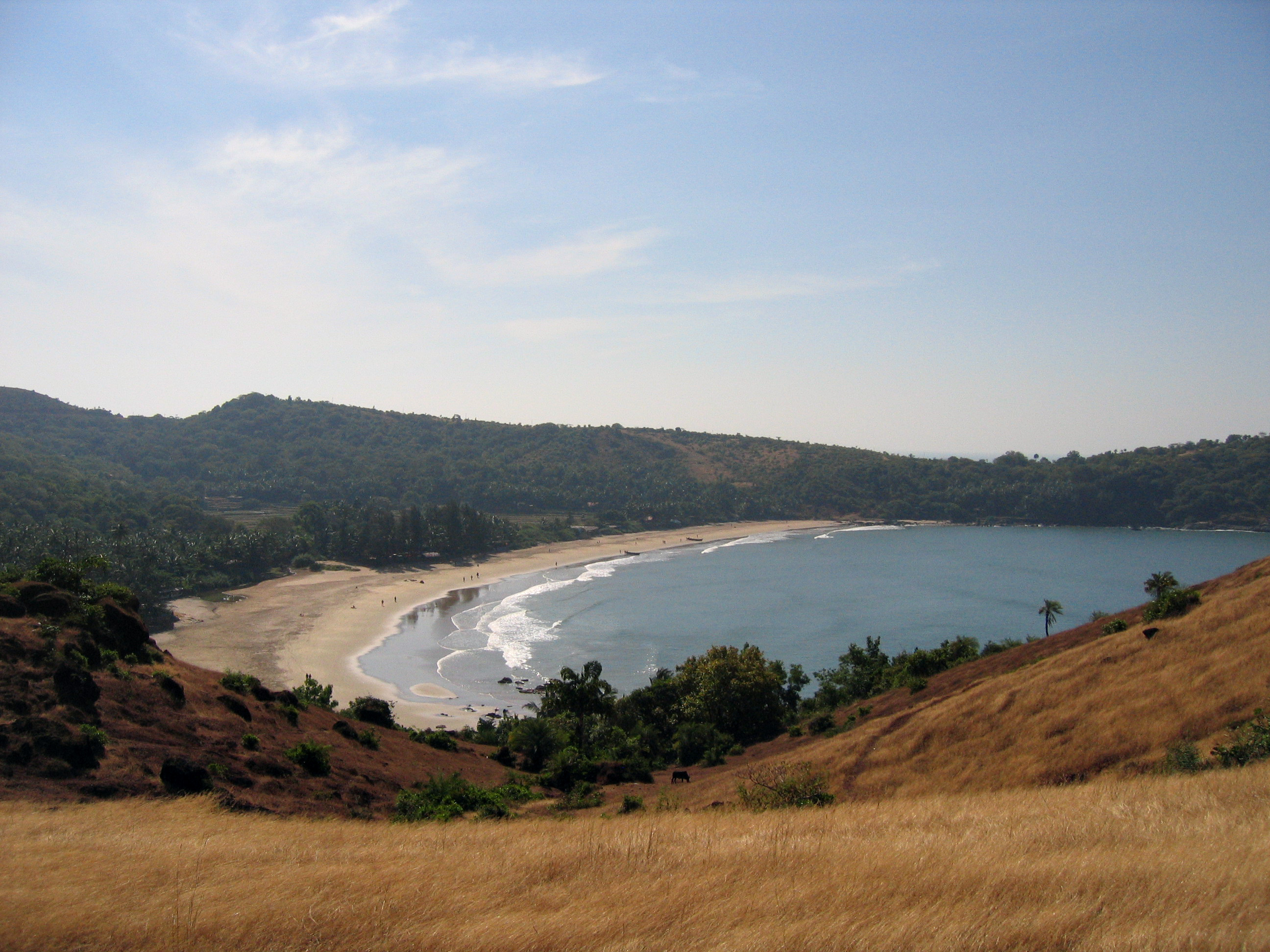
View for Kudle beach seen from north

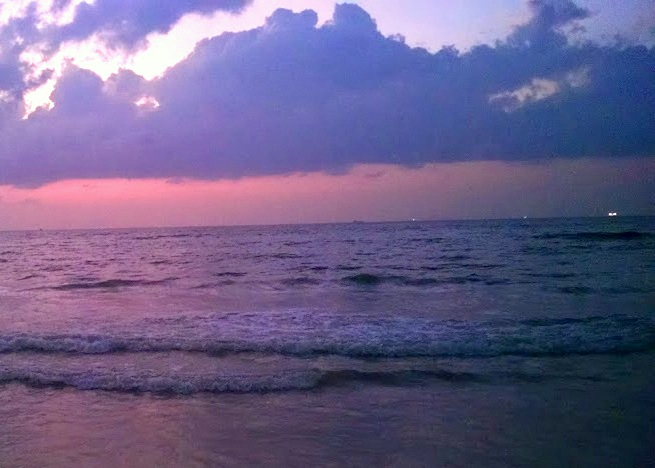
Panambur Beach, Mangaluru

Karnataka's coastline called Karavali stretches 320 km between Mangalore in Dakshina Kannada district and Karwar in Uttara Kannada district. Bhatkal is the main centre with around eight beaches . The coastline of Karnataka is along the eastern shore of Arabian Sea.

Karnataka's coastline spans across 3 districts Dakshina Kannada, Udupi and Uttara Kannada.

== Dakshina Kannada ==
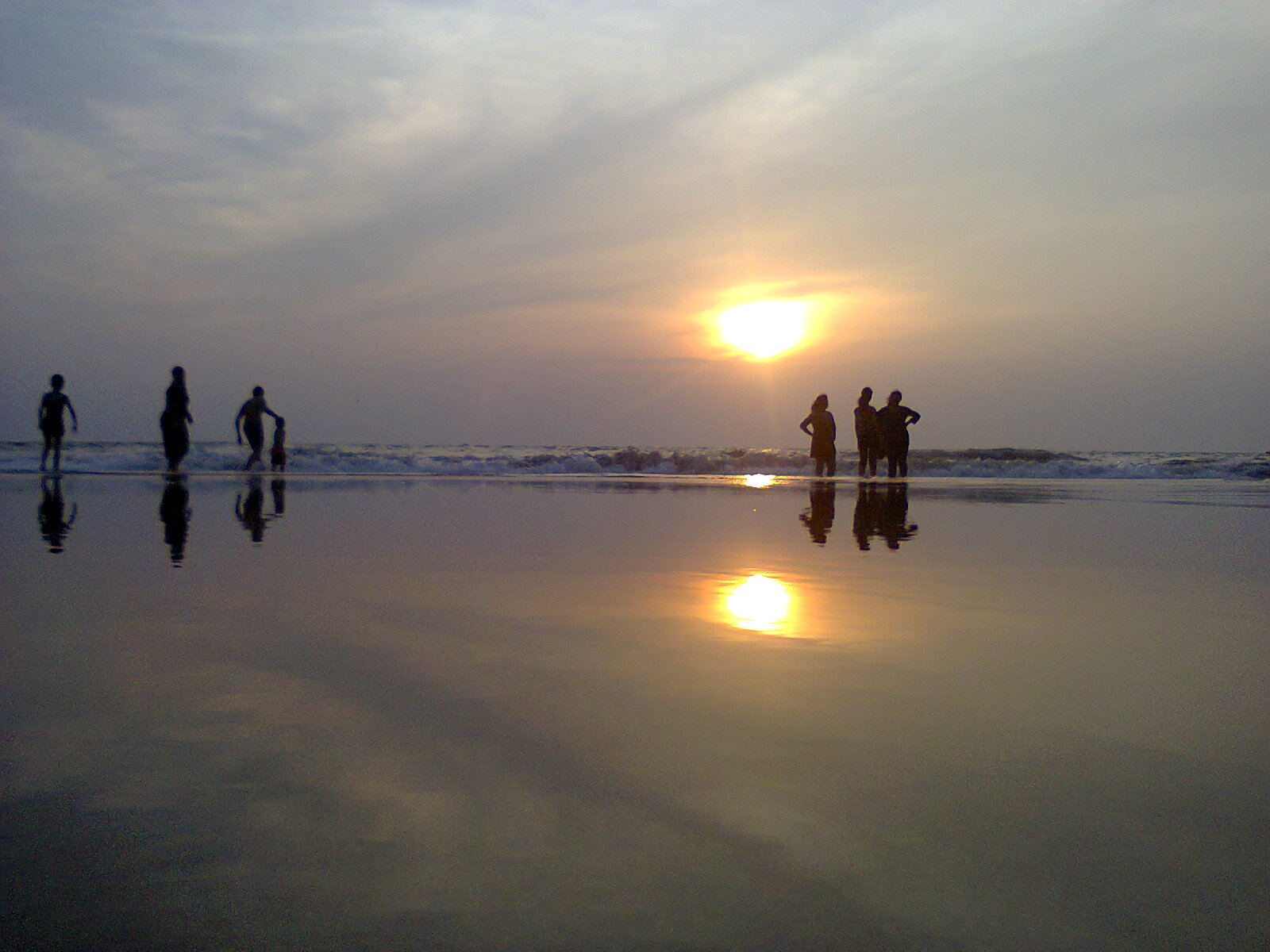
Tannirbhavi Beach, Mangalore

=== Mangaluru ===
- Panambur Beach
- NITK Beach
- Sasihithlu Beach
- Tannirbhavi Beach
- Someshwar Beach
- Mukka Beach
- Ullal beach
- Love beach
- Kotekar-Beeri Beach
- Batapady Beach
- Bengre Beach
- Mulki Beach

== Udupi ==
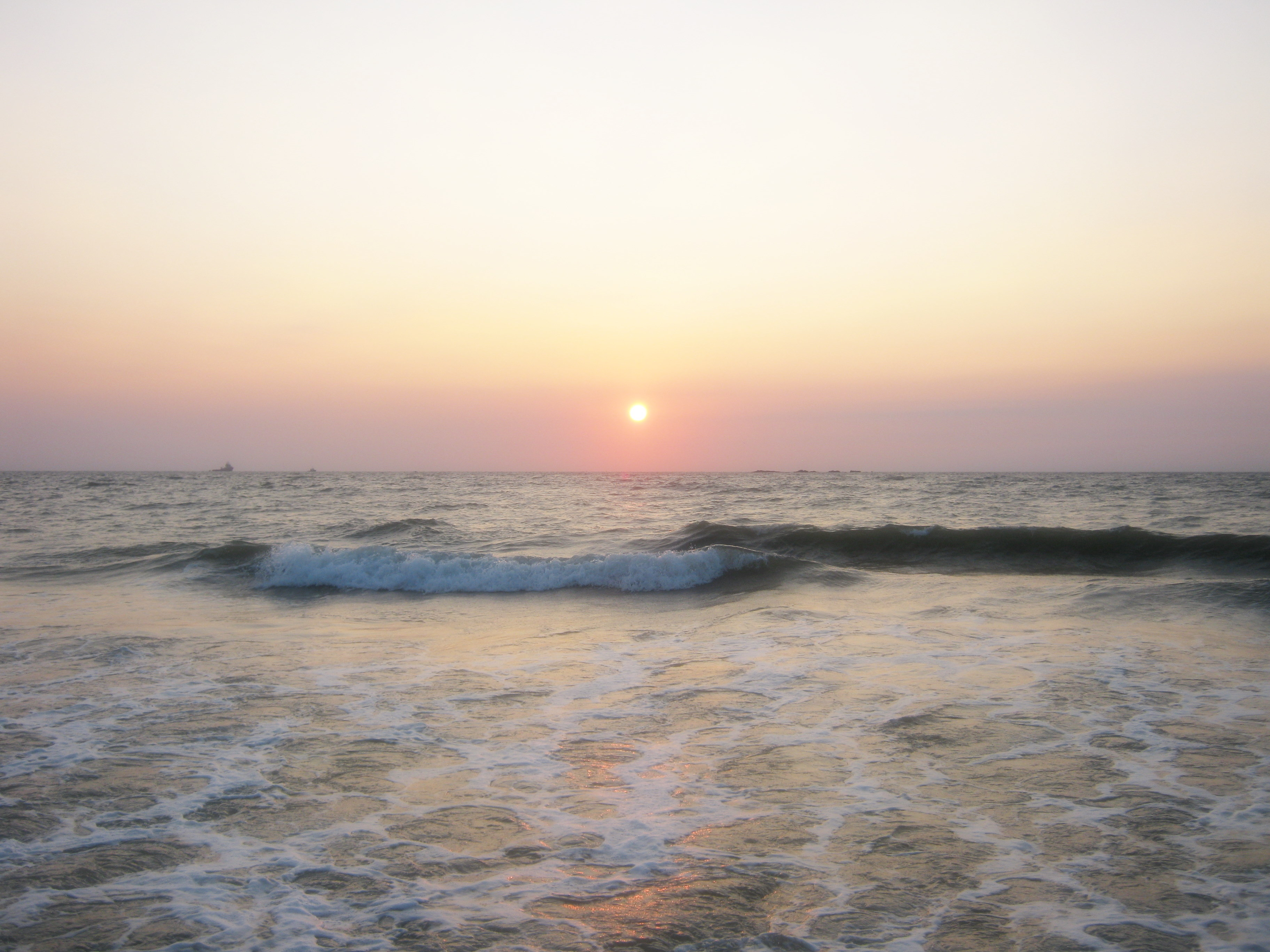
Malpe beach, Udupi

=== Kundapur ===
- Maravanthe Beach
- Kodi Beach
- Trasi Beach

=== Udupi ===
- Malpe Beach
- St. Mary's Islands Beach
- Delta Beach
- Kaup Beach
- Padubidri Beach

== Uttara Kannada ==
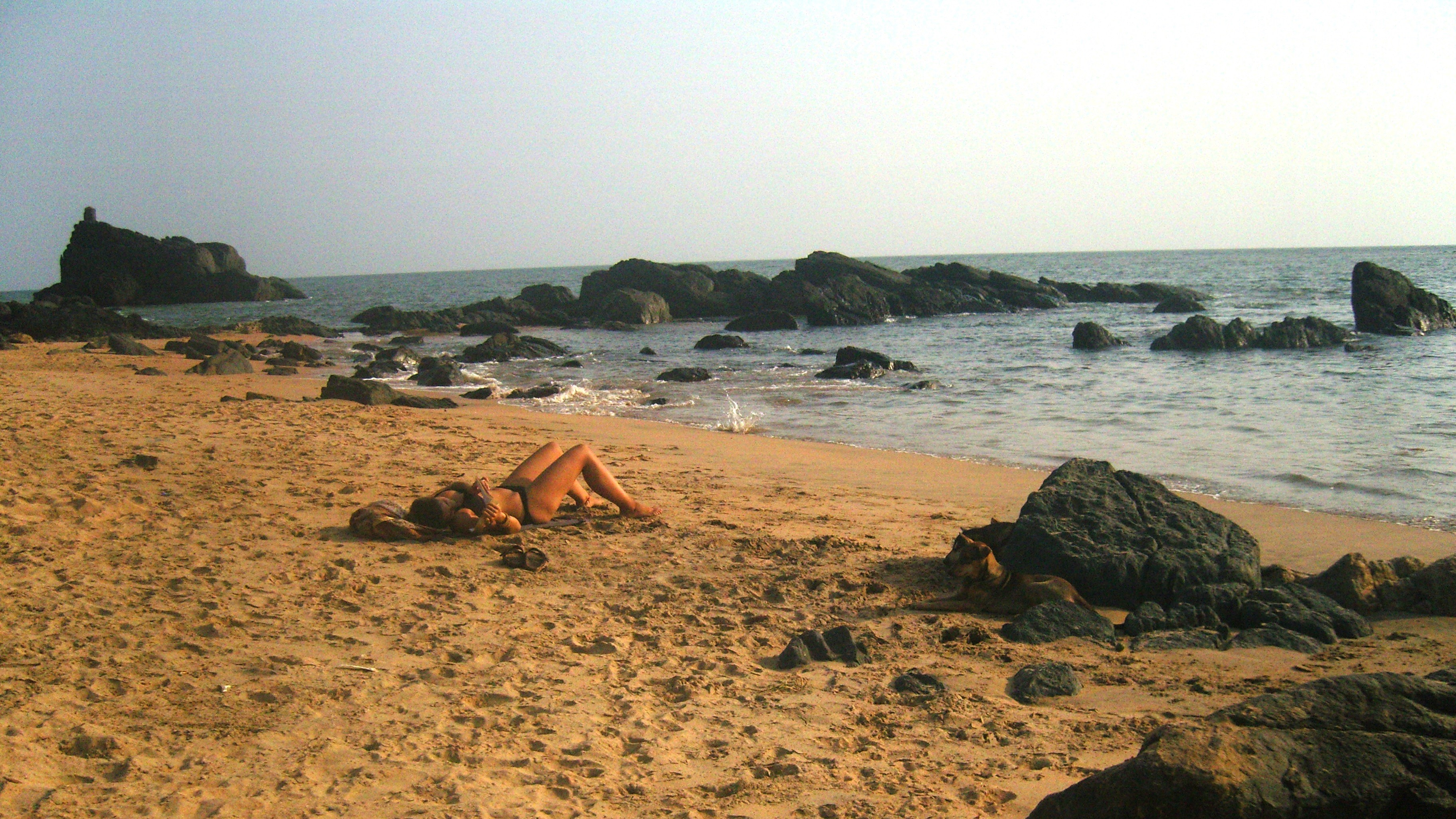
A tourist sun bathing in Om beach

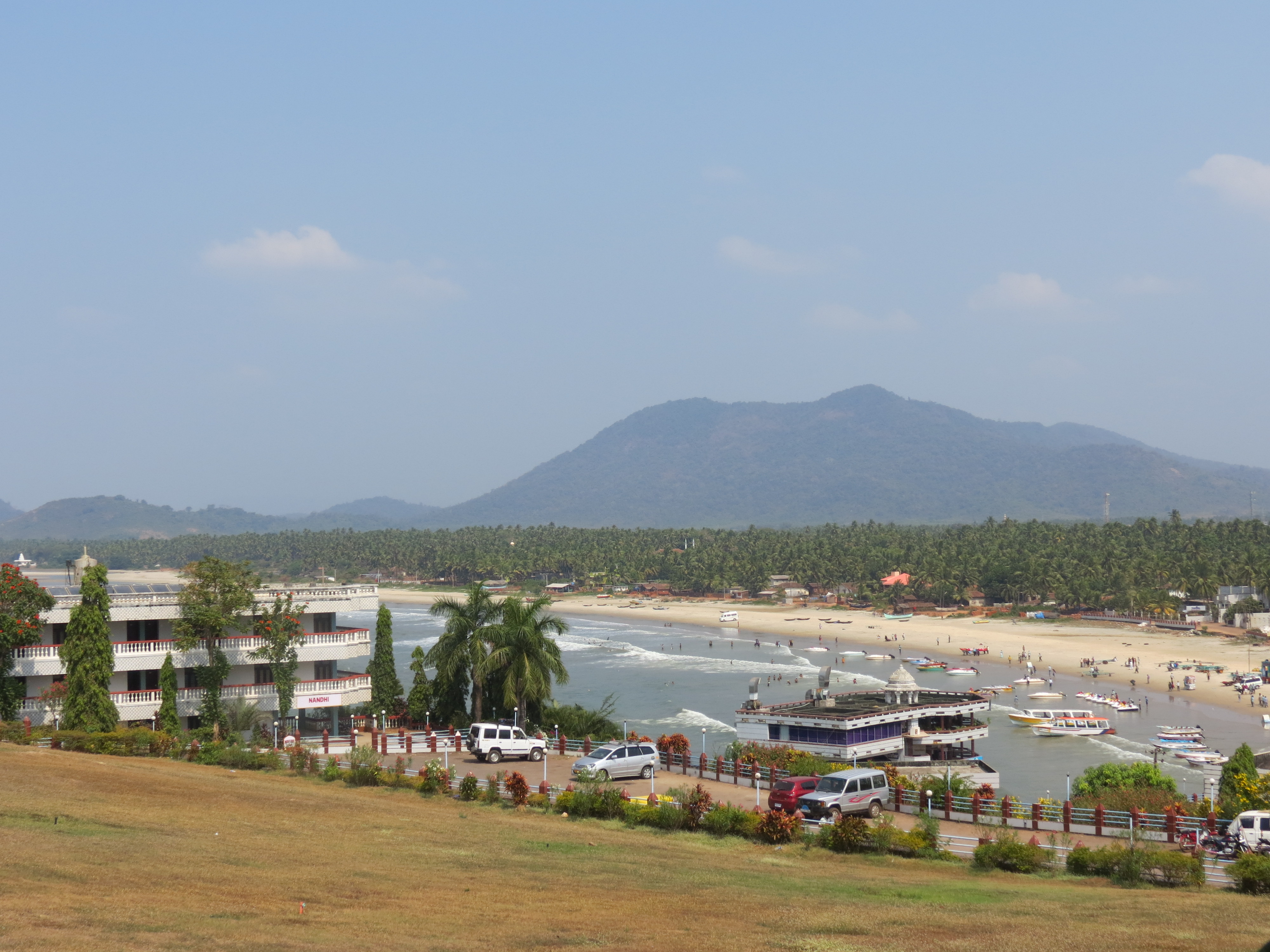
Murudeshwara beach

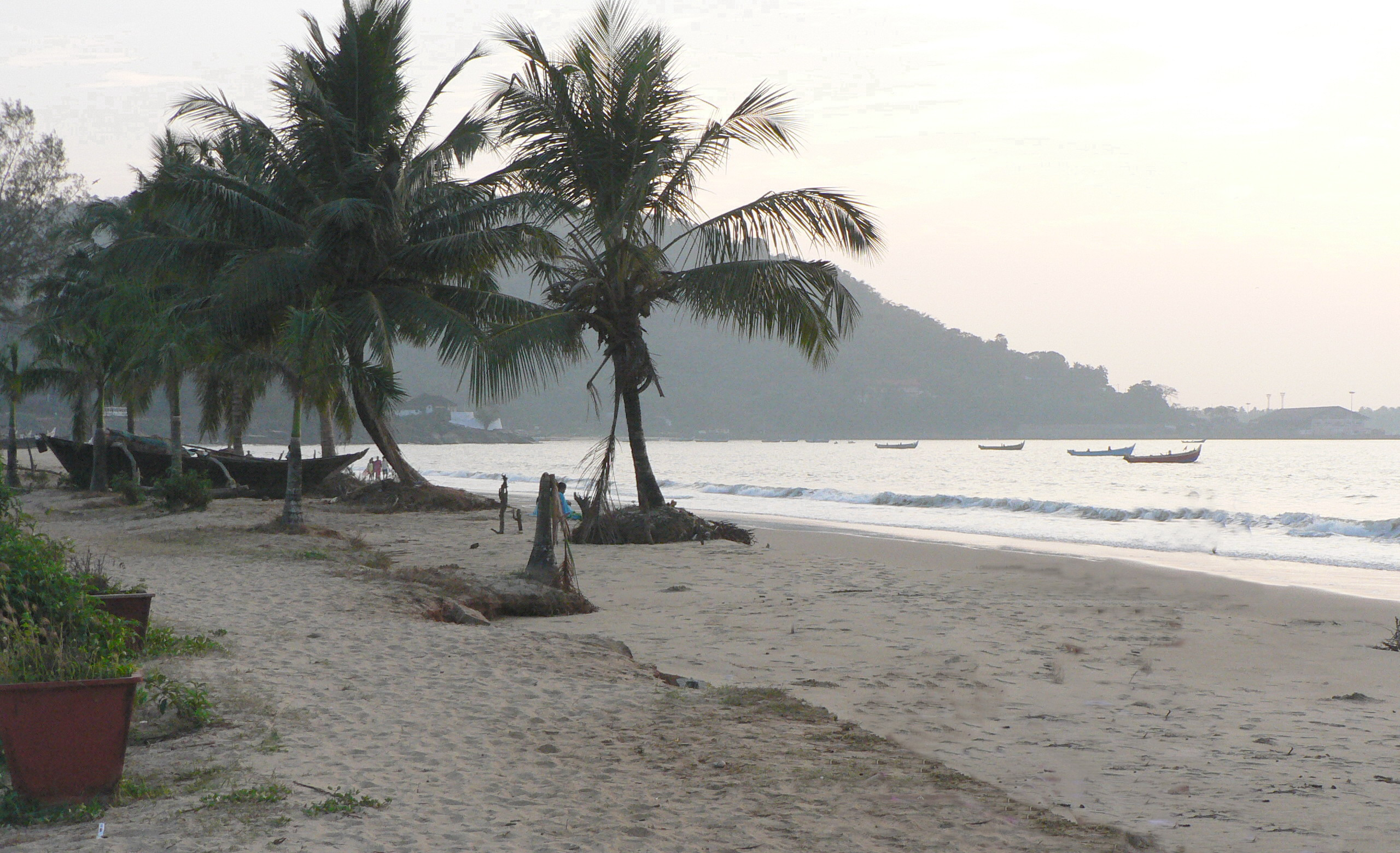
Karwar beach

=== Karwar ===
- Majali Beach
- Rabindranath Tagore beach (Karwar)

=== Ankola ===
- Belekeri Beach

=== Kumta ===
- Kadle Beach

=== Gokarna ===
- Kudle beach
- Om beach
- Gokarna beach

=== Bhatkal ===
- Belke beach
- Sodigadde beach
- Hadin echo beach
- Nastar beach
- Mavinkurve beach
- Karikal beach
- Jaali beach
- Tengingundi beach
- Alvekodi beach
- Bengre beach
- Murudeshwar beach
- Bailoor beach
