= Adel Javanmard =

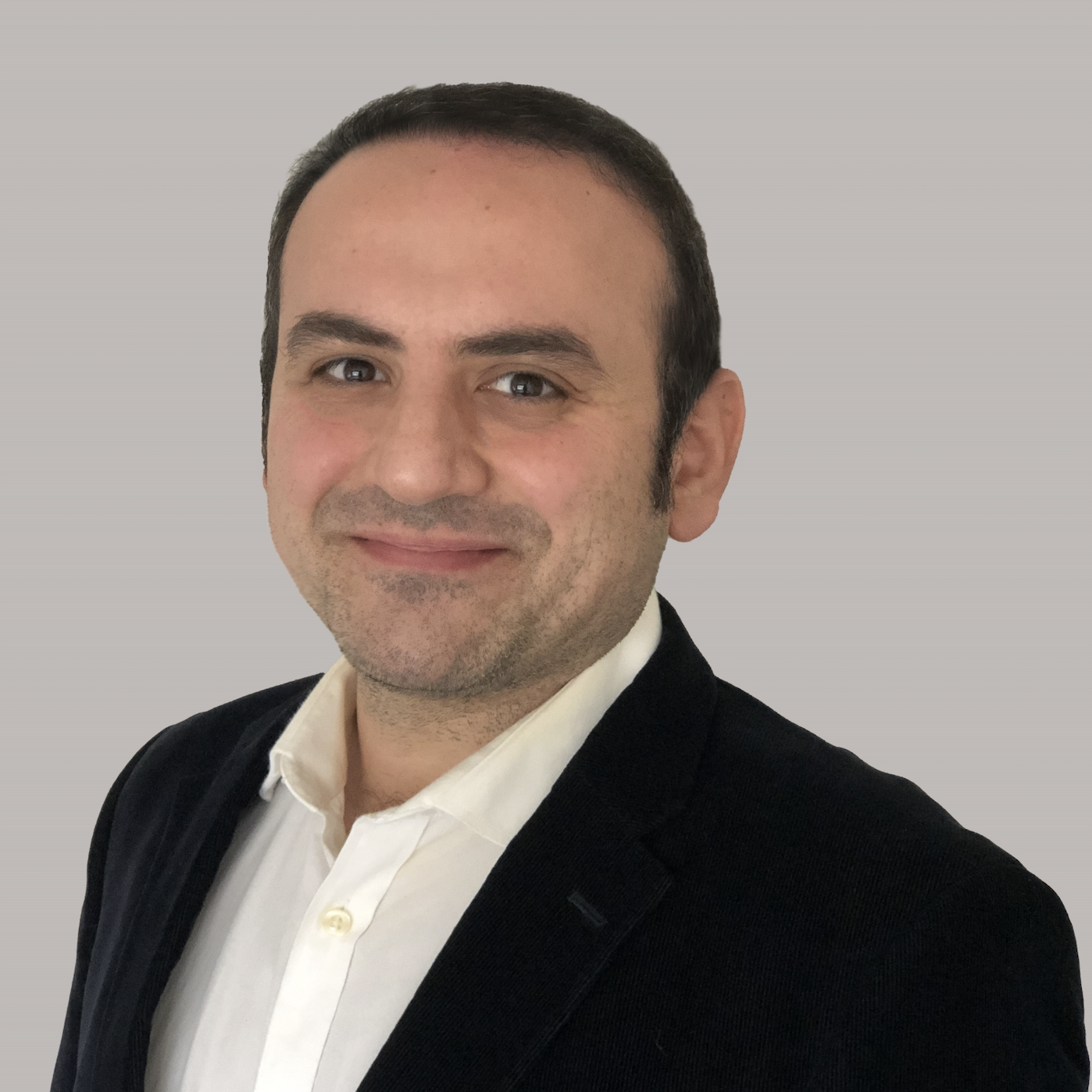
- Born: 1987 (age 38–39)
- Education: Stanford University; Sharif University of Technology
- Awards: NSF CAREER Award (2019); Sloan Fellowship (2021)
- Scientific career
- Fields: Statistics; Artificial intelligence Machine Learning; Data science
- Thesis: Inference and estimation in high-dimensional data analysis

Adel Javanmard (born 1987) is a professor in the fields of artificial intelligence, machine learning, statistics and data science. He has worked on high-dimensional statistics, foundations of deep neural network, message passing, and differential privacy. He is a professor of Data Sciences and Operations at the Marshall School of Business at the University of Southern California (USC).

== Early life and education ==
While in high school, Javanmard earned a gold medal in the National Mathematical Olympiad in 2003 and a silver medal at the 45th International Mathematical Olympiad (IMO) in 2004. He completed his undergraduate studies with BSc degrees in electrical engineering and pure mathematics at Sharif University of Technology. In 2014, he received his PhD in Electrical Engineering from Stanford University. His PhD thesis, "Inference and estimation in high-dimensional data analysis" won the Thomas Cover dissertation award from IEEE Information Theory Society.

== Academic biography ==
After completing his doctorate, Javanmard was an NSF postdoctoral fellow at the Center for Science of Information with UC Berkeley, working with David Tse. In 2015, he joined University of Southern California (USC) as a faculty member in the Data Sciences and Operations Department in the Marshall School of Business.

== Research ==
Javanmard has worked in high-dimensional statistics, robust machine learning, optimization, network analysis, personalized decision-making, and private learning.

== Awards and honors ==
- Alfred P. Sloan Research Fellowship
- NSF CAREER Award
