= Ghanshyam Tiwari =

Ghanshyam Tiwari may refer to:

- Ghanshyam Tiwari (politician, born 1947), MLA of the Sanganer constituency, Rajasthan
- Ghanshyam Tiwari (politician, born 1979), spokesperson of the Samajwadi Party
