= Srinivas University =

Private university in Karnataka, India

- Established: 2015
- Affiliations: UGC
- Chancellor: Raghavendra Rao
- Vice-Chancellor: Satyanarayana Reddy
- Location: Mangaluru, Karnataka, India
- Website: srinivasuniversity.edu.in

Srinivas University is a private university located in Mangaluru, Karnataka, India. The university was established in 2015 by the A. Shama Rao Foundation through the Srinivas University Act, 2013.

It is part of the Srinivas Group of Institutions. Srinivas University held it sixth annual convocation ceremony on 10 February 2024 at its Mukka, Surathkal campus.

== Conferred Doctorates ==
The university authorities conferred Honoris Causa on Sri Vidyadheesha Tirtha Swamiji.

== Controversies ==
In 2016, the university faced criticism and saw protests against Hijab ban in their Valachil Campus. In 2021, nearly ten students from the university was arrested by Karnataka Police for violent ragging. The group came under the scanner of IT raids in 2021, following the NEET Cancellation Scandal.

In 2025, a case was registered against the University for Coastal Regulation Zone violation by encroaching river bed of Nandini River in Mukka.
