= Srinivas Institute of Medical Sciences and Research Centre =

Srinivas Institute of Medical Sciences and Research Centre is a medical college and medical centre outside Surathkal in Mukka, Mangaluru, India.

Srinivas was started by the A. Shama Rao Foundation inr 2009.

== Description ==
Srinivas Institute of Medical Sciences and Research Centra is affiliated with Rajiv Gandhi University of Health Sciences in Bengaluru and is recognized by the Medical Council of India (MCI).

Srinivas serves the Tulu linguistic minority category, with a few seats are reserved for Tulu candidates. Admissions to MBBS course is through All India entrance test (NEET) and the total intake per year is 150.

Medical campus is in Mukka near Surathkal which houses teaching hospital, class rooms, administrative building among others. The medical campus is on the east side National Highway 66 (Formerly NH-17). The Srinivas University campus is near to NITK, Surathkal Campus. The Srinivas medical college organises health check camps for poor rural people.

== About the foundation ==
The A. Shama Rao Foundation operates a group of higher education institutions in India. The foundation was established in 1988 in memory of Adka Shama Rao
