= R. C. Hiremath =

Indian academic professor (1920-1998)

- Born: 15 January 1920; Kuradagi, Gadag, Karnataka, India
- Died: 3 November 1998 (aged 78); Dharwad, Karnataka, India
- Occupations: Professor of Linguistics and Kannada and Vice Chancellor of Karnatak University, Dharwad

R. C. Hiremath (15 January 1920 Kuradagi, Gadag, Karnataka, India – 3 November 1998 Dharwad, Karnataka, India) was a professor of Kannada and the Vice-Chancellor of Karnataka University, Dharwar after A. S. Adke. Hiremath was the president of the 59th Kannada Sahitya Sammelana. He was a founding member the Dravidian Linguistics Association and the director of International School of Dravidian Linguistics (ISDL) in Trivandrum. His work ranges from creative and critical work to several editorial publications.

== Early life and career ==
After losing his father at an early age and the loss of his mother's eyesight, R. C. Hiremath faced grave difficulties and was forced to provide for his family. He however completed his early education with great distinction and received a M.A. (Bombay University 1945) and PhD (Karnatak University 1955) in Kannada. He started his career as a professor of Kannada at Basaveshwar College, Bagalkot. He soon joined the emerging department of Kannada in Karnatak University, Dharwad as a reader, and went on to build a full-fledged Institute of Kannada studies. In recognition of his contribution to the institute, the institute was named after Dr. Hiremath posthumously. He and his team at the institute gathered an extensive collection of rare manuscripts and conducted research. This effort resulted in publication of several important Kannada works especially in the field of Vachana Sahitya.

Hiremath had post-doctoral training in Modern Linguistics at the University of California, Berkeley, USA on a Rockefeller Foundation senior fellowship for a period of 3 years. He was later instrumental in setting up the study of Linguistics at Karnatak University and participated in several Dravidian Linguistics conferences.

== Administrative career ==
During his illustrious academic career at Karnatak University, Dr. Hiremath also took interest in several non-academic activities as a member of various committees including the syndicate and academic council. In 1974, he was called upon to fill in as the acting Vice-Chancellor when the incumbent Smt. Jayalakshammani could not perform her duties due to illness. He was later confirmed as the Vice-Chancellor from 1 May 1975 to 30 April 1978. During his tenure, the university celebrated its Silver Jubilee and flourished with significant investment in infrastructure. The establishment of the Music Department and the Yoga studies stand out among his unique achievements during his tenure as Vice-Chancellor. In the music department, he organised some of the most renowned exponents of the Hindustani Classical Music under one umbrella under the leadership of Padma Vibhushan Pandit Mallikarjun Mansur.

== Creative and critical works ==
- Buddhism in Karnataka
- The Genesis and Growth of Dravidian
- Mahakavi Raghavanka Virachita Somanatha Chaaritra
- The Structure of Kannada.
- Women in the Changing World
- Sri Channabasavesvara
- Jivandhara charite
- Ṣaṭsthalachakravarti Cannabasavaṇṇanavaru
- Ṣaṭsthalachakravarti Cannabasavaṇṇanavara vachanagaḷu
- Shunyasampadane Vol 1 (English)

The following are sourced from Books Published tab at: https://dkprintworld.com/author-book/r-c-hiremath/

- Sumanjali (collection of original poems)
- Mounaspandana (collection of original poems)
- Sahitya Samsruti (Critical essays)
- Basava Puran I and II (editorial)
- Mahaling Leela (editorial)
- Akhandeshwar Vachan (editorial)
- Kaivalya Darpana (editorial)
- Poet Padmanank (editorial)
- Padmaraj Puran (editorial)
- Somanatha Charitra (editorial)
- Kundan (editorial)
- Kottur Basaveshwara Charitra
- Samara Dundubhi (editorial)
- Balaleela Mahanteshwara puran (editorial)
- Somanatha Charitry Sangrah
- Bhairaveshwara Kavyada Kathamani Sutra Ratnakara - 1
- Satsthala Jnan Saramrut (editorial)
- Channabasavannanavara Vachanagalu (editorial - 1965)
- Satsthala Prabhe - 1965
- Shunyasampadane (Translation - 1965)
- Trishashtipuratana Charitram (editorial - 1966)
- Bhairaveshwara Kavyada Kathamani Sutra - Ratnakara - II (editorial - 1968)
- Twentyseven Shivasharaneyara Vachanagalu (Ippattelu) (editorial - 1968)
- Amugi Rayamma mattu Akkammana Vachanagalu (editorial - 1968)
- Basavannavara Vachanagalu (editorial - 1968)
- Mahakavi Raghavanka - 1968
- Basavaraja vijayam (editorial - 1968)
- Siddharameshwara Vachanagalu (editorial - 1968)
- Jyoti Belagutide (editorial - 1969)
- Padmasree (editorial - 1970)
- Vibhuti Purusharu (editorial - 1970)
- Rajashekhar Vilasam Sangrah (editorial - 1970)
- Veerashaiva Chintamani (editorial - 1970)
- Mukti Kanthabharan (editorial - 1971)
- Basav Puran (Full) (editorial - 1971)
- Neelammana Vachanagalu Lingammana Vachanagalu - 1971)
- ShunyaSampadane (Mahadevayya) (editorial - 1971)
