= Mukka Beach =

Mukka beach
- Beach
- Location: Mukka
- City: Mangaluru
- Country: India

Government
  - Body: Mangaluru City Corporation

Mukka beach is a beach in Mukka, Mangaluru situated in north of NITK Beach. This beach which is based in the coasts of Arabian Sea.

One can experience variety of shells on this beach. Mukka beach is covered with the golden sands and tall pine trees. An old light house is also situated on this beach

== Location ==
Mukka beach is located in the rural side of the city of Mangaluru. It is situated towards the northern side National Institute of Technology of the Surathkal Campus connecting the National Highway - 66. Mukka village is quiet developed town.

== Connectivity ==
One can take city bus (No. 2A) from Statebank to Mukka.
