= Padubidri Beach =

Beach in Karnataka, India

- Sandy beach
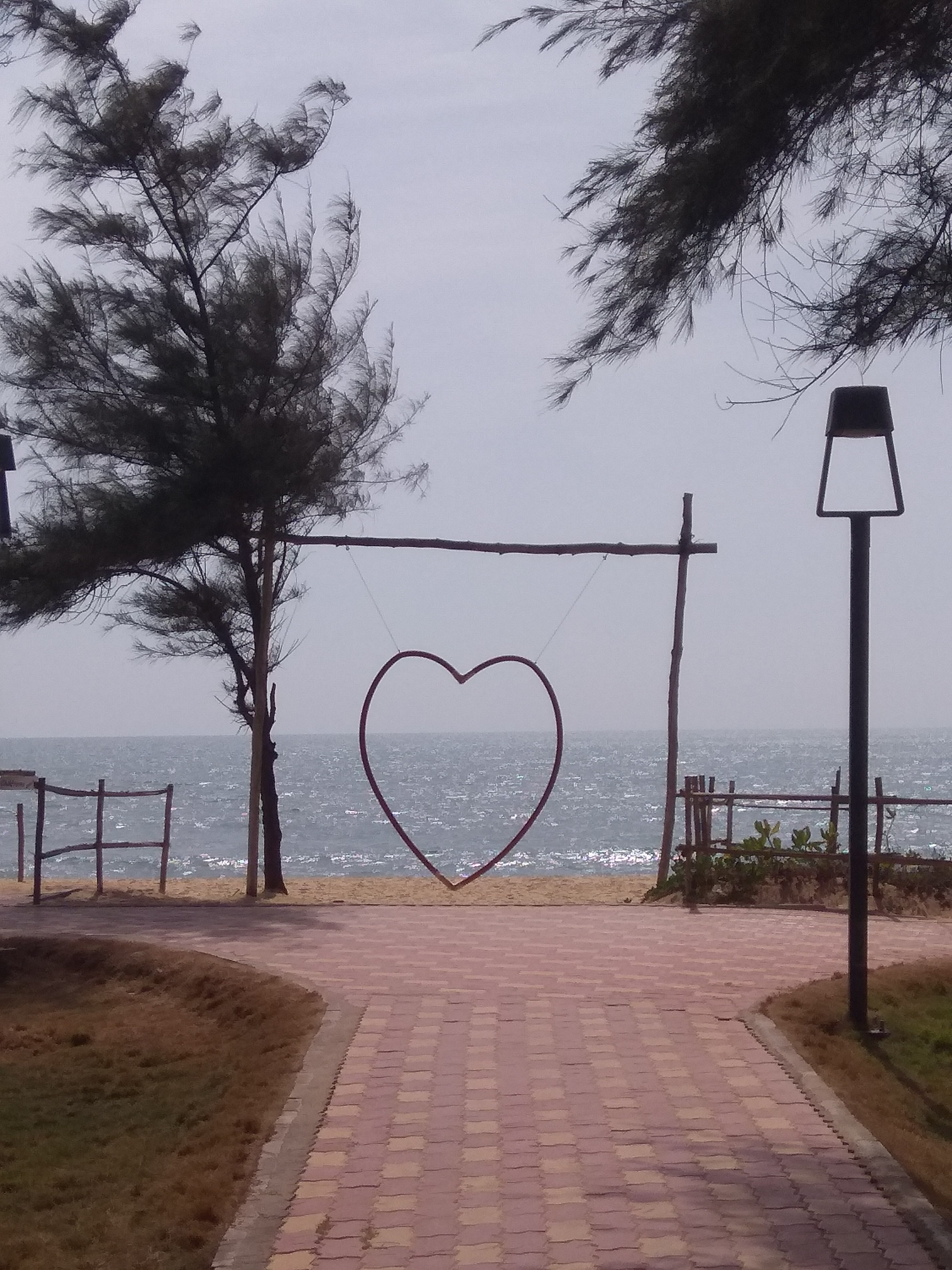
- Coordinates: 13°07′55″N 74°45′44″E
- Location: Padubidri, Udupi district, Karnataka, India
- Offshore water bodies: Arabian Sea

Padubidri Beach is a coastal beach located at Padubidri in the Udupi district of Karnataka, India. It is one of the Blue Flag-certified beaches in the country, recognized for its cleanliness, environmental sustainability, and well-maintained facilities. The beach is known for its golden sands, tranquil waters, and lush green surroundings, attracting tourists and nature enthusiasts.

== Location and accessibility ==
Padubidri Beach is situated approximately 24 kilometres (15 mi) from Udupi and 50 kilometres (31 mi) from Mangalore International Airport. It is easily accessible by:

- Road: Regular bus services and taxis from Udupi and Mangalore.
- Rail: The nearest railway station is in Padubidri.
- Air: The closest airport is Mangalore International Airport.

== Environmental significance ==
Padubidri Beach is one of the few beaches in India that has received the prestigious Blue Flag beach certification from the Foundation for Environmental Education (FEE) in Denmark. This certification ensures high standards in: - Water quality - Safety measures - Environmental education and awareness - Waste management and eco-friendly tourism

== Conservation efforts ==
Padubidri Beach follows eco-friendly practices to maintain cleanliness and sustainability: - Plastic-free zones - Solar-powered lighting - Proper waste management systems - Beach clean-up drives and environmental awareness programs

== Best time to visit ==
The ideal time to visit Padubidri Beach is between October and May, during the dry season, when the weather is pleasant and the sea remains calm.

== See also ==
- Beaches of Karnataka
- Tourism in Karnataka
