= David Tse =

Electronic engineer and information theorist

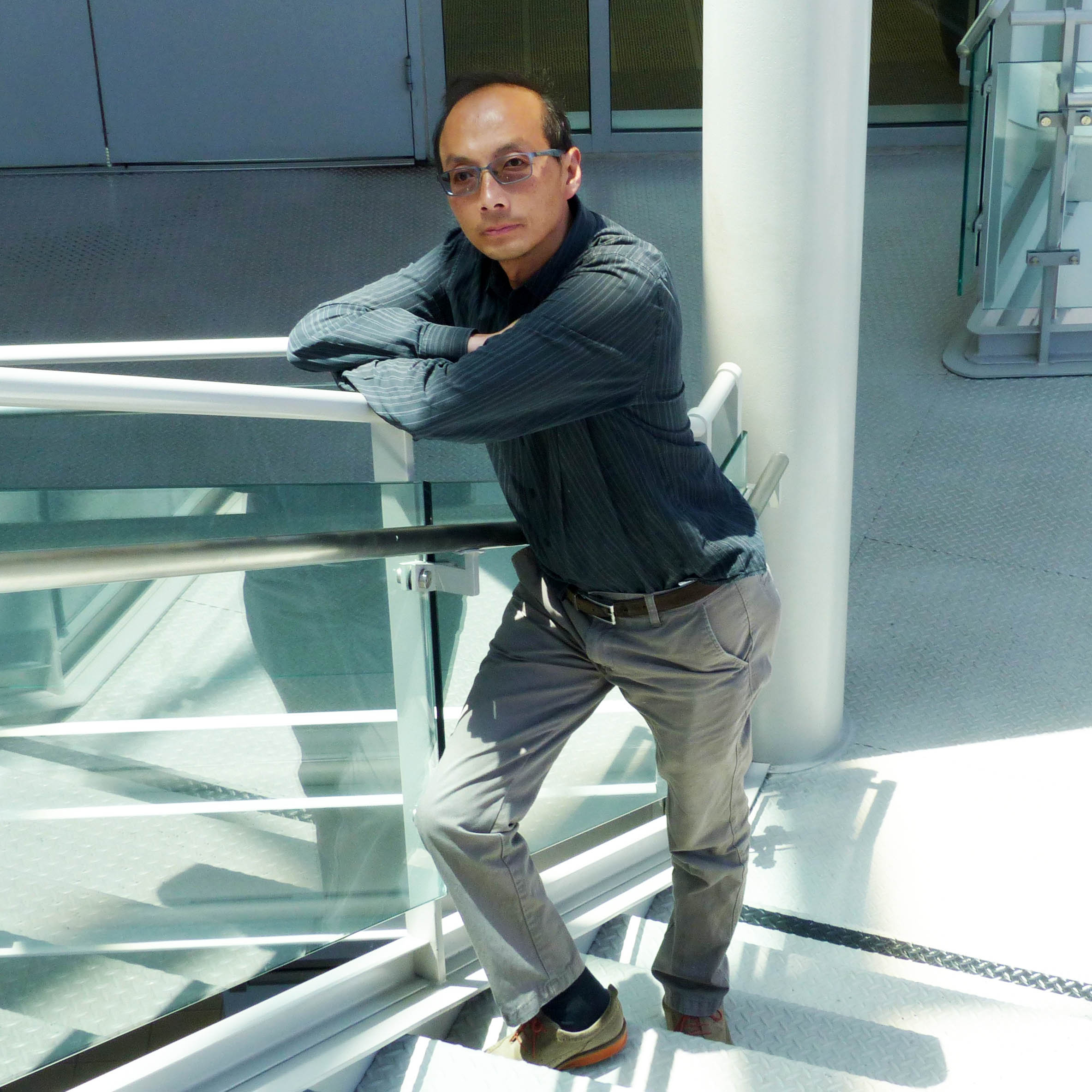
- David Tse
- Education: University of Waterloo; MIT
- Awards: Claude E. Shannon Award (2017); IEEE Richard W. Hamming Medal (2019)
- Scientific career
- Fields: Information theory
- Thesis: Variable-rate lossy compression and its effects on communication networks (1995)
- Doctoral advisor: Robert G. Gallager; John Tsitsiklis
- Doctoral students: Salman A. Avestimehr; Pramod Viswanath; Lizhong Zheng

David Tse (Chinese: 謝雅正; pinyin: Xiè Yǎzhèng) is the Thomas Kailath and Guanghan Xu Professor of Engineering at Stanford University.

== Education ==
Tse earned a B.S. in systems design engineering from University of Waterloo in 1989, an M.S. in electrical engineering from the Massachusetts Institute of Technology in 1991, and a Ph.D. in electrical engineering from MIT in 1994. As a postdoctoral student he was a staff member at AT&T Bell Laboratories.

== Career ==
Tse's research at Stanford focuses on information theory and its applications in fields such as wireless communication, machine learning, energy and computational biology. He has designed assembly software to handle DNA and RNA sequencing data and was an inventor of the proportional-fair scheduling algorithm for cellular wireless systems. He received the 2017 Claude E. Shannon Award. In 2018, he was elected to the National Academy of Engineering.

== Honors ==
- Early Faculty National Science Foundation CAREER Award, 1998
- Frederick Emmons Terman Award from the American Society for Engineering Education, 2009
- Fellow, IEEE, 2009
- Gilbreth Lectureship from the National Academy of Engineering, 2012
- Stephen O. Rice Prize in the Field of Communications Theory, 2013
- Claude E. Shannon Award, 2017
- Member, National Academy of Engineering, inducted 2018
- IEEE Richard W. Hamming Medal, 2019

== Book ==
- Fundamentals of Wireless Communication (2005, Cambridge University Press) (ISBN 978-0521845274) – with Pramod Viswanath
