= Pramod Viswanath =

American-Indian computer scientist

Pramod Viswanath is an electrical engineer, information theorist, entrepreneur, and the Forrest G. Hamrick Professor in Engineering at Princeton University. He was formerly a professor at the University of Illinois at Urbana-Champaign. His research has spanned wireless communication systems, full-stack blockchain technologies, and deep learning algorithms. He is a Fellow of the Institute of Electrical and Electronics Engineers (IEEE).

== Education ==
Viswanath received his bachelor's degree from the National Institute of Technology Karnataka and Ph.D. degree in electrical engineering and computer science from the UC Berkeley College of Engineering in 2000.

== Career and Recognition ==
Viswanath was a founding engineer at Flarion Technologies (later acquired by Qualcomm), where he developed frameworks that became the basis for 4G LTE wireless networks.

In 2001, he started as an assistant professor at the University of Illinois at Urbana-Champaign. He co-wrote a popular textbook, "The Fundamentals of Wireless Communication," with David Tse in 2005; it has received more than 18,000 citations.

In 2013 Viswanath was named an IEEE Fellow "for contributions to the theory and practice of wireless communications." He is the recipient of a National Science Foundation CAREER Award and a Xerox Faculty Research Award from the Grainger College of Engineering.

He left UIUC in 2022 as the Gilmore Family Endowed Professor to join Princeton University's School of Engineering and Applied Science.

He has a number of patents and research accomplishments to his name. He has also authored a number of books and research papers. Two of those papers won best paper awards at the Association for Computing Machinery's 2019 MobiHoc symposium and 2015 SIGMETRICS conference.

He is a co-founder of Kaleidoscope Blockchain, Inc. and Sentient, a foundation for distributed artificial intelligence development.
