= Salman A. Avestimehr =

American academic

Salman Avestimehr
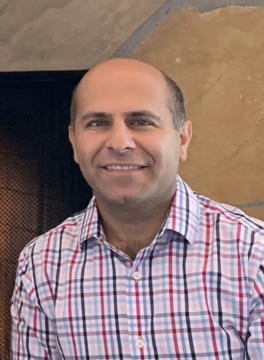
- Born: Amir Salman Avestimehr
- Education: Sharif University of Technology; UC Berkeley
- Known for: “An Approximation Approach to Network Information Theory,”
- Awards: PECASE (2011); IEEE Information Theory Society James L. Massey Research & Teaching Award (2019); National Science Foundation CAREER Award
- Scientific career
- Fields: Machine learning; Information theory; Coding theory; Distributed computing
- Workplaces: University of Southern California; California Institute of Technology; Cornell University
- Thesis: Wireless network information flow: a deterministic approach (2008)
- Doctoral advisor: David Tse
- Website: viterbi.usc.edu/directory/faculty/Avestimehr/Salman

Salman A. Avestimehr is a Dean's professor at the Electrical & Computer Engineering and Computer Science Departments of University of Southern California, where he is the inaugural director of the USC-Amazon Center for Secure and Trusted Machine Learning (Trusted AI) and the director of the Information Theory and Machine Learning (vITAL) research lab. He is also the CEO and Co-Founder of FedML. Avestimehr's contributions in research and publications are in the areas of information theory, machine learning, large-scale distributed computing, and secure/private computing and learning. In particular, he is best known for deterministic approximation approaches to network information theory and coded computing. He was a general co-chair of the 2020 International Symposium on Information Theory (ISIT), and is a Fellow of IEEE. He is also co-authors of four books titled “An Approximation Approach to Network Information Theory”, “Multihop Wireless Networks: A Unified Approach to Relaying and Interference Management”, “Coded Computing”, and “Problem Solving Strategies for Elementary-School Math.”

== Education ==
Avestimehr completed his bachelor's degree in electrical engineering from Sharif University of Technology in 2003. He received his M.S. degree in 2005 in electrical engineering and computer science from University of California, Berkeley in 2005. Continuing his studies at UC Berkeley, he finished his Ph.D. in computer science in 2008; his doctoral adviser was David Tse.

== Career and research ==
Avestimehr was a postdoctoral scholar at the Center for the Mathematics of Information (CMI) at Caltech in 2008. He served as an assistant professor at the school of electrical and computer engineering of Cornell University from 2009 to 2013. Avestimehr was promoted to a Dean's professorship in electrical and computer engineering at the University of Southern California, where he has taught since 2013. He is also the inaugural director of the USC-Amazon Center for Secure and Trusted Machine Learning. He has been a general co-chair of the 2020 International Symposium on Information Theory (ISIT). He has also been an associate editor for IEEE Transactions on Information Theory. Current research areas of Prof. Avestimehr include information theory, distributed computing, machine learning, and secure and private learning/computing.

== Awards and honors ==
- 2020. IEEE Fellow
- 2019. IEEE Information Theory Society James L. Massey Research & Teaching Award
- 2015. The Okawa Foundation Award
- 2013. IEEE Communications Society and Information Theory Society Joint Paper Award
- 2011. Presidential Early Career Award for Scientists and Engineers (PECASE, 2011)
- 2010. National Science Foundation CAREER Award

== Bibliography ==
- “An Approximation Approach to Network Information Theory,” by A. S. Avestimehr, S. Diggavi, C. Tian and D. Tse, Foundations and Trends in Communications and Information Theory, 2015.
- “Multihop Wireless Networks: A Unified Approach to Relaying and Interference Management,” by I. Shomorony and A. S. Avestimehr, Foundations and Trends in Networking, 20114.
- “Coded Computing,” by S. Li and A. S. Avestimehr, Foundations and Trends in Communications and Information Theory, 2020.
- “Problem Solving Strategies for Elementary-School Math,” by K. Avestimehr and A. S. Avestimehr, Now Publishers, 2020.

== Selected publications ==
- C. He, M. Annavaram, and A. S. Avestimehr, “Group Knowledge Transfer: Federated Learning of Large CNNs at the Edge,” in NeurIPS, 2020.
- C. He, et al, A. S. Avestimehr, “FedML: A research library and benchmark for federated machine learning”.
- Q. Yu, S. Li, N. Raviv, M. Mousavi Kalan, M. Soltanolkotabim and A. S. Avestimehr, “Lagrange Coded Computing: Optimal Design for Resiliency, Security and Privacy,” in Proc. AISTATS 2019.
- M. Yu, Z. Lin, K. Narra, S. Li, Y. Li, N. S. Kim, A. Schwing, M. Annavaram, and A. S. Avestimehr, “GradiVeQ: Vector Quantization for Bandwidth-Efficient Gradient Aggregation in Distributed CNN Training,” in NeurIPS,

2018.

- S. Li, M. A. Maddah-Ali, Q. Yu and A. S. Avestimehr, “A Fundamental Tradeoff Between Computation and Communication in Distributed Computing,” in IEEE Transactions on Information Theory, vol. 64, no. 1, pp. 109–128, Jan. 2018.
- S. Li, M. A. Maddah-Ali and A. S. Avestimehr, “A Scalable Framework for Wireless Distributed Computing,” in ACM/IEEE Transactions on Networking, vol. 25, no. 5, pp. 2643–2654, Oct. 2017.
- N. Naderializadeh, M. Maddah-Ali, and A. S. Avestimehr, “Fundamental Limits of Cache-Aided Interference Management,” in IEEE Transactions on Information Theory, vol. 63, no. 5, pp. 3092–3107, May 2017.
- S. Li, M. A. Maddah-Ali and A. S. Avestimehr, “Coding for Distributed Fog Computing,” IEEE Communications Magazine, vol. 55, no. 4, pp. 34–40, April 2017.
- Q. Yu, M. A. Maddah-Ali and A. S. Avestimehr, “Polynomial Codes: an Optimal Design for High-Dimensional Coded Matrix Multiplication,” in NIPS, 2017.
- C. Geng, N. Naderializadeh, A. S. Avestimehr, and S. Jafar, “On the Optimality of Treating Interference as Noise,” IEEE Transactions on Information Theory, Vol 61, No 7, 2015.
- N. Naderializadeh and A.S. Avestimehr, “ITLinQ: A New Approach for Spectrum Sharing in Device-to-Device Communication Systems,” IEEE Journal on Selected Areas in Communications Special Issue on 5G Wireless Communication Systems, Vol 32, No 6, 2014.
- I. Shomorony and A. S. Avestimehr, “Worst-Case Additive Noise in Wireless Networks,” IEEE Transactions on Information Theory, Vol 59, No 6, June 2013
- I. Shomorony and A. S. Avestimehr, “Two-Unicast Wireless Networks: Characterizing the Degrees-of-Freedom,” IEEE Transactions on Information Theory, Vol 59, No 1, January, 2013.
- V. Aggarwal, A. S. Avestimehr, and A. Sabharwal, “On Achieving Local View Capacity Via Maximal Independent Graph Scheduling,” IEEE Transactions on Information Theory, Special Issue on Interference Networks, Vol 57, No 5, May 2011.
- A. S. Avestimehr, S. N. Diggavi, and D. N. C. Tse, “Wireless Network Information Flow: A Deterministic Approach,” IEEE Transactions on Information Theory, Vol. 57, No. 4, pp. 1872–1905, April 2011.
