= Travelyaari =

Travelyaari.com
- Website type: Private
- Available in: English
- Founded: April 2008
- Headquarters: Bengaluru, India
- Area served: India
- Founders: Aurvind Lama, Parthasarthi Sinha, and Prateek Nigam.
- Industry: Travel services
- Products: Bus booking, Travel Agent booking, Bus ERP
- Website: travelyaari.com
- Current status: Active

Travelyaari.com is an Indian bus booking company headquartered at Bangalore, India. With a network of over 3,500 bus operators on its website and 150,000 bus options per day on 45,000 routes, it has served over 150 million bus travelers till date. It books 150,000-200,000 bus tickets daily through Mantis Technologies platform. It also enables 8,000-9,000 offline travel outlets to help them book bus tickets.

== About ==
Travelyaari.com is a brand of Mantis Technologies Pvt. Ltd. Mantis, through its wide range of online products (i.e. Travelyaari, BusCRS.com, IamGDS.com, BusTicketBooking API) has incorporated the internet into the bus industry. Thus making the industry more accessible, organised, transparent, efficient and collaborative. Travelyaari.com also has a tours section which offers handpicked travel packages at affordable prices.

Travelyaari is an Indian online bus ticketing website with its offices in Bangalore and other major cities like Ahmedabad, Delhi, Mumbai, Pune, and Chandigarh.

It claims to have 1.54 million monthly visits as per Similarweb. and expects a turnover of about $200–250 million for the financial year ending March 2018.

Travelyaari has features in their online booking system that maintain the safety of single women passengers. It also provides insurance that provides bus travelers protection against last minute cancellations and accidents.

== History ==
Travelyaari.com started operations in year 20 April 2007 by IIM Ahmedabad Graduates and industry professionals, Parthasarthi Sinha, Aurvind Lama and Prateek Nigam.

Mantis Technologies, Travelyaari's parent company, also develops a global distribution systems for bus operators to manage their inventories and operations.
