= A. S. Adke =

Indian academic

Appa Saheb Adke was an Indian educator and administrator, and the vice-chancellor of Karnatak University in Dharwad, India, after the tenure of Dr. D. C. Pavate ended in 1967. Prior to this, Dr. Adke was the principal of Karnataka Regional Engineering College, Surathkal.
