= Trasi =

- Village
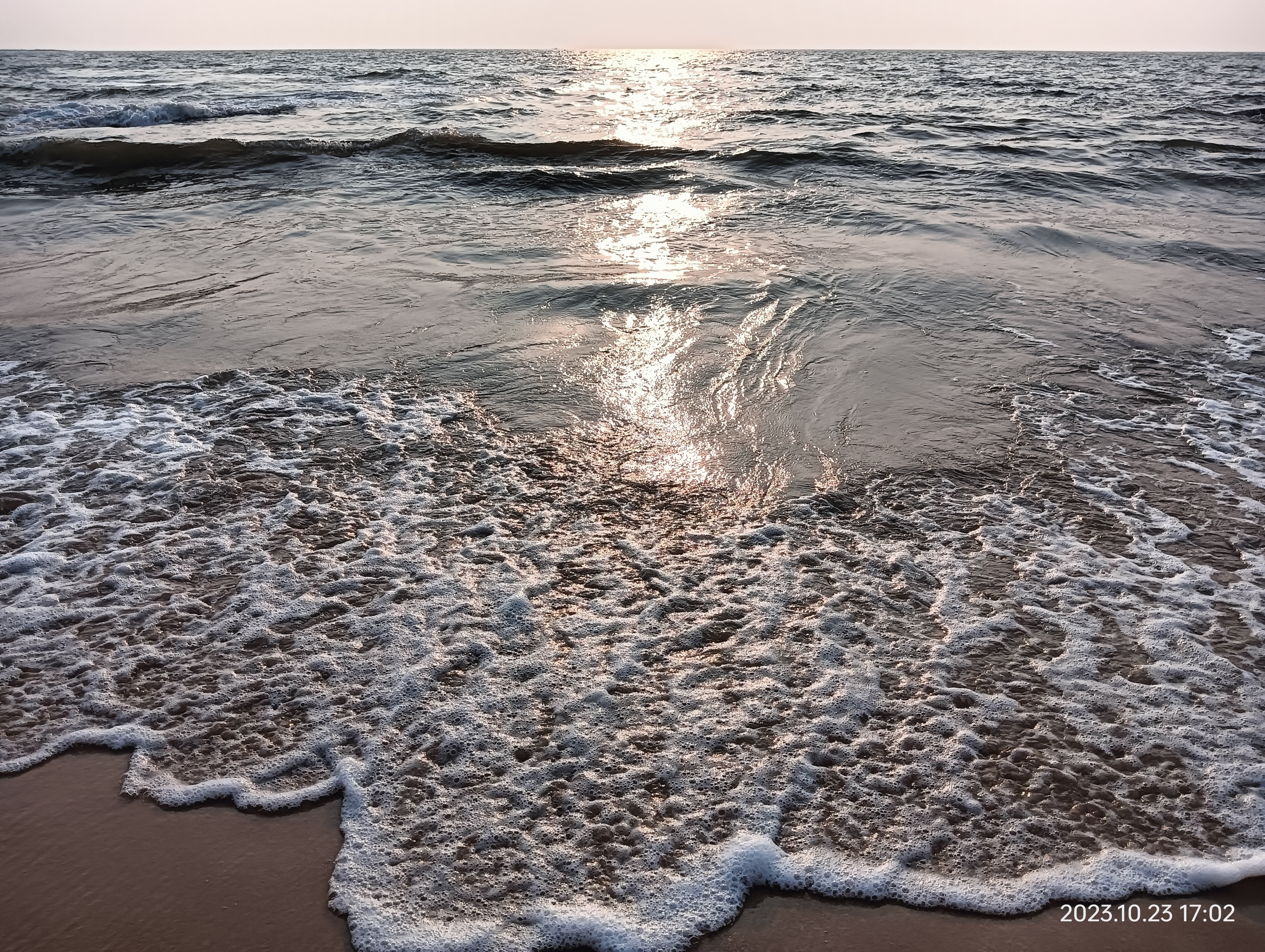
- Trasi Beach
- Interactive map of Trasi
- Coordinates: 13°41′25″N 74°39′07″E
- Country: India
- State: Karnataka

Government
  - Body: Gram panchayat

Languages
  - Official: Kannada
- Time zone: UTC+5:30 (IST)
- Postal code: 576235
- ISO 3166 code: IN-KA
- Vehicle registration: KA
- Website: karnataka.gov.in

Trasi is a village on the west coast of India, 12 km north of Kundapur in Kundapura Taluk, Udupi District.

== Demographics ==
As of 2011, Trasi has a total population of 3140 people consisting of 1737 male and 232 female residents. The village occupies a total area of 536.67 hecatres with a population density of 5.851 people per hectare. As of 2011, the total literacy rate was 78.18% which was higher than the national average of 59.5%.

As of 2011, Trasi has an employment rate of over 35.25%, 99.19% of whom are employed over 183 days in a year.

== Trasi beach ==
Trasi beach is a nesting destination for Olive Ridley sea turtles.

== Christ the King Church ==
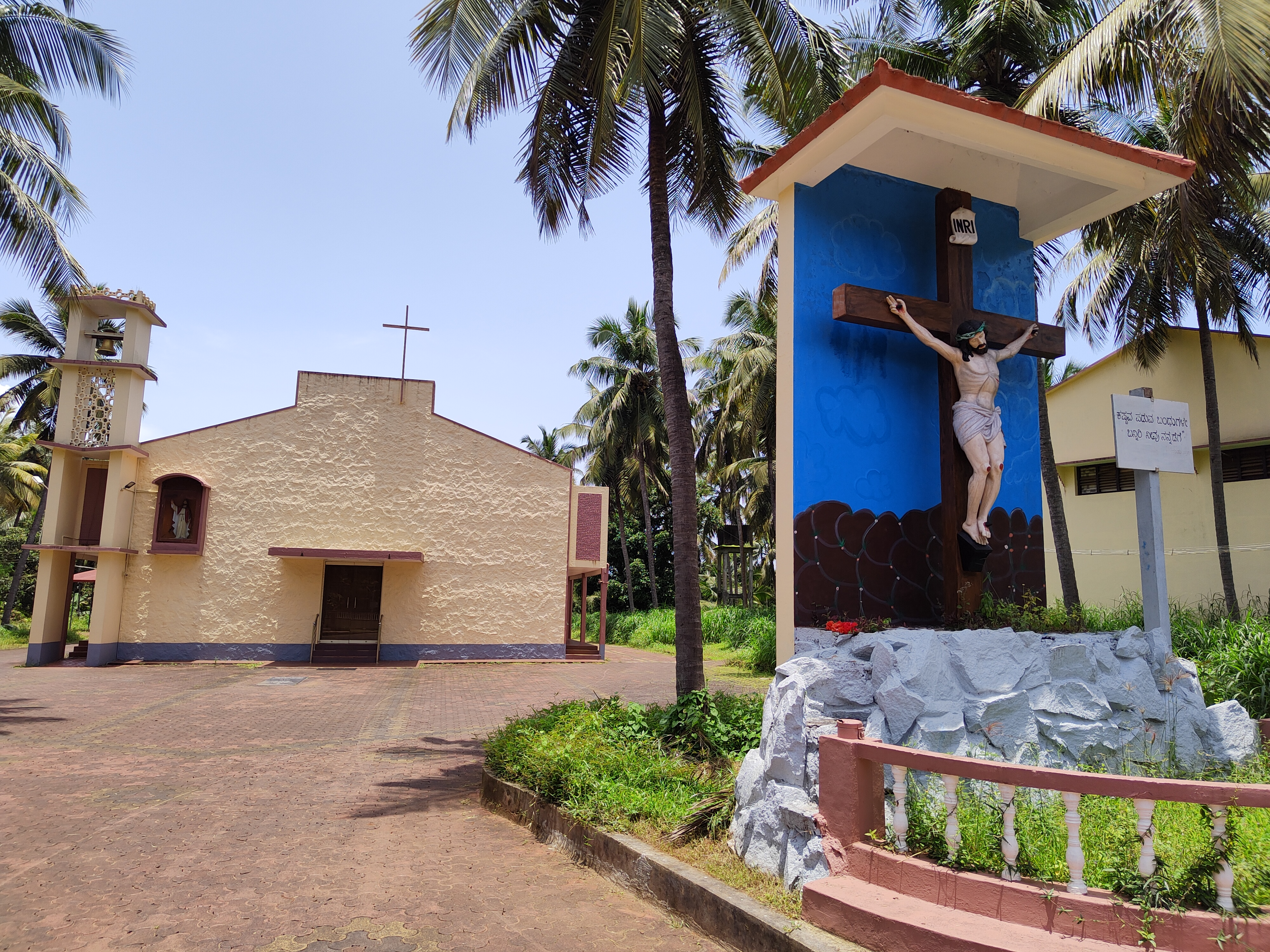
Christ the King Church

Christ the King Church was elevated to being a full-fledged parish in 1971, prior to which it was a substation of the 'Immaculate Conception of the Blessed Virgin Mary Church' a parish since 1630 in Gangolli to early Goan/Portuguese settlers who migrated south from Goa around 1560.

On arrival, the settlers built a modest church building near the 'Bundar'. On being annexed to Goa in about 1629, the old building made way for a new one and then again to the final church which stands there today.

The parish caters to over 200 families today, who are descendants of the old settlers.

== Island ==
There is a small island of about 100 meters radius which is about a kilometer offshore. This island is called Coral Island.
