= Srinivas Group of Institutions =

Coordinates: 12°51′24.7″N 74°50′16.9″E

- Motto: Samagra Gnana
- Type: Public
- Established: 1988
- President: CA. A. Raghavendra Rao
- Location: Mangaluru, Karnataka, India
- Website: www.srinivasgroup.com

Srinivas Group of Institutions, formerly Srinivas Group of Colleges, runs educational institutes in and around Mangaluru, Karnataka, India.

The Colleges are managed by A. Shama Rao Foundation, which is an Educational and Public Charitable Registered Trust. It was founded by Raghavendra Rao, an auditor by profession. The group offers multidisciplinary higher education through Srinivas University.

== Hotel Management ==
Srinivas College' of Hotel Management was established in 1988.

It is one of the oldest institutes offering hotel management courses in India and is affiliated with Mangalore University leading to B.H.M. The college is located in Pandeshwar, Mangalore.

== Physiotherapy ==
Srinivas College of physiotherapy and Research Centre, Mangalore, started BPT in December 1993 in the cosmopolitan city of Mangalore, Karnataka.

Affiliation & Recognitions:

The college is affiliated to Rajiv Gandhi University of Health Sciences, Karnataka, Bangalore and Srinivas University and a member of Indian Association of Physiotherapists (IAP), which is a member of World Confederation of Physical Therapists (WCPT).

== Nursing ==
The group has an institute offering courses in nursing. A Shama Rao nursing school offers three and half years diploma in nursing. The college was started in 2003. The candidate desiring admission must have passed pre university course in science stream with biology as one of the subjects. The clinical facilities are in and around Mangalore city.

== Computer Application ==
The Srinivas Institute of Management studies offers M.C.A course. The B.C.A course is offered by Srinivas College of Computer and Information Sciences. Both the colleges are affiliated to Srinivas University. The M.C.A as well as B.C.A courses are of three years duration. The minimum requirement of admission to B.C.A is 45% pass marks in a pre university course. MCA course is also offered by Srinivas Institute of Technology, Valachil, Mangalore. The college is affiliated to VTU Belgaum.

== Business Administration ==
The Srinivas Institute of Management studies offers two-year full-time M.B.A course. The B.B.M course is offered by Srinivas First Grade College has a duration of three years. Both of these colleges are affiliated to Mangalore University. Srinivas Institute of Technology, Valachil also offers two-year full-time M.B.A course affiliated to VTU, Belagavi.

== Engineering ==
A four-year engineering course leading to Bachelor in Engineering degree (B.E) is offered by Srinivas Institute of Technology and Srinivas School of Engineering. Srinivas institute of technology is one of the few college in Karnataka to provide Marine engineering and Automobile engineering. Srinivas institute of technology is the first & only college in Mangalore region to build an electric ATV and to participate in Baja SAE India, team called Ebaja team SITE racing Mangaluru. And team has also have ranked 2nd-lightest vehicle built so far in India.

== Pharmacy ==
The Srinivas College of Pharmacy belongs to the Srinivas group of colleges. The college offers BPharma course of four-year duration. It is located at Valachil village near Mangalore. The first Batch of BPharma was out in 2008. Hence Srinivas College of Pharmacy would complete its 4 years in 2008. Master's degree in Pharmacy is now available for affordable fees.

== Allied Health Sciences ==
The Srinivas University Institute of Allied Health Sciences offers a variety of undergraduate and postgraduate courses in allied health sciences. These courses are designed to prepare the students for careers in a variety of health care settings, including hospitals, clinics, and community health centers.
