= Tejo-Tungabhadra =

Indian social novel

- Author: Vasudhendra
- Language: Kannada
- Genre: Fiction
- Published: 2019
- Publisher: Chanda Books
- Publication place: India
- ISBN: 978-93-84908-54-6

"Tejo-Tungabhadra" is a novel written by the author Vasudhendra. The social novel chronicles the history of Vijayanagara Empire, Portuguese, Bahmani Sultanate and the lifestyle of that period. It is a work that depicts the general and the constitutional work of the 15th-16th century. Tejo-Tungabhadra was awarded the Karnataka Sahithya Akademi Award in 2019.

== Illustration of the book ==
The first printing of the novel Tejo-Tungabhadra was published by Chanda Book publishing house. The fist print of this 464-page novel is priced at ₹ 380 in India. The Front page of the book is designed by Soumya Kalyankar. NS Mapplitho 70 GSM Paper is used for 1/8 Demi Measurement of this book for publishing the novel.

== The plot ==
The plot of the novel is based on studies of the social life of Lisbon, Vijayanagar and Goa in the 15th - 16th century. The story is about Gabriel, raised on the banks of the Tigris or Tejo River in Portugal, travels to India and comes across the people on the banks of Tungabhadra River. The story of the novel begins from about 1492 A.D and continues till the 1518 A.D. Historical figures such as Manuel I of Portugal, King of Portugal, Queen Isabella of Spain, Vasco da Gama, Alfonso de Albuquerque, Krishnadevaraya and Purandara Dasa are the characters of the Novel. Along with all of these characters, some fictional characters currently make up the novel. Historical events include the discovery of the sea route to India by Vasco da Gama, Baptism of the Jewish community expelled from Spain who took refuge in Portugal, The novel takes place in the wake of forced Baptism, the genocide of the Jewish and Christians, victory of Krishnadevaraya on Kalinga kingdom and many other events.

The story opens with the love story of Christian boy Gabriel and the Jewish girl Bella in Lisbon, on the banks of the Tejo River. At the time, western countries had a special demand for the spices of Eastern India. Portugal has been at the forefront of inventing the sea route to India to meet this demand and is quite wealthy in this business. The youth of Lisbon were getting rich by working as sailors when they returned with such merchants. Gabriel would also join a ship as a sailor for the purpose of making money. Gabriel promises Bella that he will earn some money and return and marry her. The story on one side takes place on the banks of the Tejo River and on other side the story of Mapala Nayaka, Thembakka, Hampamma and Keshava takes place in Tembakapura, on the banks of the Tungabhadra River in the Vijayanagara Empire of India.It thus proceeds in parallel by delineating events in separate geographical areas. Gabriel inevitably came to India and is converted to Islam and has to lead a life as Ahmed Akanna. The novel combines ideas with a number of historical events. In addition to the political transitions of the time, social conditions, cultural practices along with religious practices such as Sati, Lenka have been used to supplement the story.

== Awards and recognition ==
Tejo-Tungabhadra novel won the Karnataka Sahithya Academy Award for the Best Novel in 2019. The Novel also won the Chadga Novel Award in 2020. The seventh edition of the novel was published in 2020.
