= Halla Bantu Halla =

2008 novel by Shrinivas B. Vaidya

- Author: Shrinivas B. Vaidya
- Language: Kannada
- Genre: Fiction, Social
- Published: 2008 Manohara Grantha Mala, Dharwad
- Publication place: India
- Media type: Print (Paperback)
- Pages: 314
- ISBN: 978-81-88478-50-7; 9788188478149

Halla Bantu Halla is a novel written by Shrinivas B. Vaidya. Vaidya won the 2008 Sahitya Akademi Award for this novel. The novel tells a story of a village in north Karnataka, gives insight of the social and political upheavals in the village in a span of a century from 1853 to 1947, as observed from an elder person of the village.
