= Mukka =

- Neighbourhood
- Location in Karnataka, India
- Coordinates: 13.0212°N 74.7905°E
- Country: India
- State: Karnataka
- District: Dakshina Kannada

Government
  - Body: Mangalore city corporation

Languages
  - Official: Kannada
  - Unofficial: Tulu
- Time zone: UTC+5:30 (IST)
- PIN: 574146
- ISO 3166 code: IN-KA
- Vehicle registration: KA19, KA62
- City: Mangaluru
- Civic agency: Mangaluru City Corporation
- Climate: Humid climate (Köppen)
- Website: karnataka.gov.in

Mukka is a suburb of Mangaluru city on the shore of the Arabian Sea along Coastal Karnataka. It is located along National Highway 66 about 18 kilometres (11 mi) north of Mangaluru city centre. The National Institute of Technology Karnataka campus lies just to the south. It is the gateway to Mangalore city from the north and an educational centre. It was a small town-village until recently but from 2010 the area is developing both educationally and commercially. The Srinivas College of Engineering and Technology and Srinivas Institute of Medical Sciences and Research Centre are located here.

The official language is Kannada but Tulu is the main language spoken here.
