= Vasudhendra =

Indian Kannada short story writer

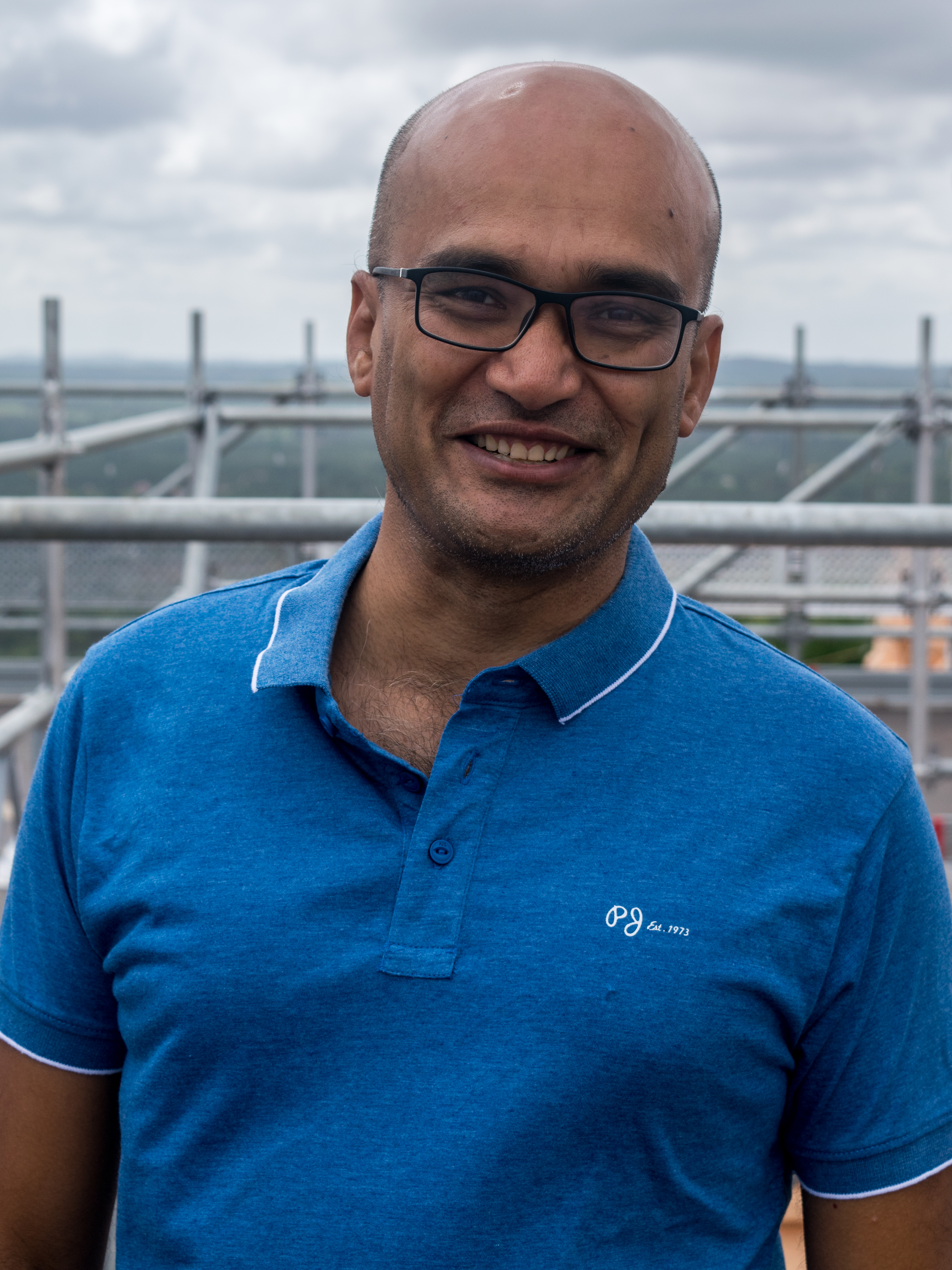
- Born: Sandur, Bellary, Karnataka, India
- Education: National Institute of Technology Karnataka; Indian Institute of Science
- Occupations: Writer, and publisher and LGBT activist
- Writing career
- Genre: Fiction
- Notable works: Tejo-Tungabhadra, Mohanaswamy, Nammamma Andre Nangishta
- Website: vasudhendra.com

Vasudhendra is an Indian author in Kannada language known for his short stories and personal essays.

== Personal life ==
Vasudhendra was born at Sandur in the Bellary district of Karnataka. He graduated with a Bachelor of Engineering degree from the National Institute of Technology, Karnataka. He then did his Master of Engineering from Indian Institute of Science. He had been a software professional since 20 years. He was also the Vice President at Genisys Software.

Vasudhendra came out as gay in the interviews with prajavani and other media houses.

== Short stories ==
1. Maneeshe (1998)
2. Ugadi (2004)
3. Chelu (2006)
4. Hampi Express (2008)
5. Mohanaswamy (2013)
6. Vishama Bhinnaraashi (2017)

== Collection of Essays ==
1. Kothigalu (2004)
2. Nammamma Andre Nangishta (2006)
3. Rakshaka Annatha (2010)
4. Varnamaya (2012)
5. Aidu Paise Vardakshine (2016)

== Novel ==
1. Harichitta Satya (2010)
2. Tejo-Tungabhadra (2019)
3. Reshme Batte (Oct. 2024)

== Translations ==
1. Mithuna (2004) (Translation of Sri Ramana's Short Stories from Telugu)
2. Everest (2015) (Translation of Jon Krakauer's Everest Mountaineering Disaster Into Thin Air)

== Science ==
1. E-Commerce

== In Braille language ==
1. Adrushya kaavya (2006) (collection of essays)

== Books in English ==
1. Mohanaswamy (Harper Perennial, Nov 2016)
2. The unforgiving city and other stories (Penguin India, Step 2021)

== Awards and recognitions ==
1. Karnataka Sahitya Academy Sahityasri Award
2. Karnataka Sahitya Academy Book Prize
3. Galaganaatha Award
4. Da Raa Bendre Story Award
5. Masti Katha Award
6. U. R. Ananthamurthy Award
7. Besagarahalli Ramanna Award
8. Vasudheva Bhoopalam Award
9. Vardhamana Udayonmukha Award
10. Amma Award from Sadem
11. Katharangam Award

== Publication ==
He has started his own publication house called the Chanda Pustaka. Through this he has given encouragement to many upcoming writers of Kannada. It has published around 100 books till date and these books have won more than 100 prestigious awards. He has instituted an award 'Chanda Pustaka Bahumana', which will be given to a fresh and young short story writer every year by publishing his first anthology along with a cash prize. He publishes all his books through this publication house and he looks after sales and marketing of his publications.

== Other interests ==
being a hiker, he has trekked across Western Ghats. He has climbed Mount Kilimanjaro of Tanzania and trekked to Kailash & Mansarovar of Tibet. He is a regular squash player. World Cinema, Mahabharata and Indian classical music are his other passions. He decided not to watch television 12 years back and he follows this till date.

Vasudendra has also done a professional course in counseling and spends most of his time these days in counseling his clients [Ref:Hindu Article].

He is also a visiting faculty in Dayanand Sagar College of Engineering where he is respected and revered by his students.

== LGBT Activism ==
Vasudhendra is also associated with a local support group for LGBT individuals, called GoodAsYou. He has been doing a lot of activism for gay rights in Karnataka and in his latest interview with vishwavani, he argued that most people do not have sex just for procreation but also for recreation and oppression against gays is similar to that against dalits and made references to early Hindu texts.
