= Lizhong Zheng =

Electrical engineer

Lizhong Zheng is an electrical engineer from the Massachusetts Institute of Technology in Cambridge, Massachusetts. He was named a Fellow of the Institute of Electrical and Electronics Engineers (IEEE) in 2016 for his contributions to the theory of multiple antenna communication.
