= National Institute of Technology, Karnataka =

Engineering university at Surathkal, Mangalore

National Institute of Technology Karnataka Surathkal
- Crest of the NITK Surathkal
- Former name: Karnataka Regional Engineering College
- Motto in English: Work is worship
- Type: Public technical university
- Established: 6 August 1960; 66 years ago
- Chairperson: B. V. R. Mohan Reddy
- Director: B. Ravi
- Location: Surathkal, Mangaluru, Karnataka, India; 13.033°N 74.47°E
- Campus: 295.35 acres; Suburban
- Website: www.nitk.ac.in

The National Institute of Technology Karnataka (NITK), also known as NITK Surathkal and formerly known as Karnataka Regional Engineering College (KREC), is a public technical university located in Surathkal, Mangaluru. NIT is in Mangaluru city. Established in 1960 as KREC, it has since evolved into one of the 31 National Institutes of Technology in India. It is recognized as an Institute of National Importance by the Government of India. The institute features a suburban campus situated in close proximity to the Arabian Sea, with National Highway 66 running through the campus and serving as a major access route.

== History ==
The foundation stone for Karnataka Regional Engineering College (KREC) was laid on 6 August 1960, at Surathkal. It was made possible through the efforts of U. Srinivas Mallya and V. S. Kudva and the area is now called Srinivasnagar in his honour. KREC began with three under-graduate courses in engineering: Mechanical, Electrical, and Civil Engineering, with affiliation to the University of Mysore. 1965 saw the beginning of under-graduate courses in Chemical and Metallurgical Engineering. In 1966, the college started its first postgraduate course in Marine Structures and Industrial Structures, followed by post-graduate courses in Industrial Electronics (1969), Heat Power (1971), Hydraulics and Water Resources (1971), Chemical Plant Design Engineering (1971) and Process Metallurgy (1972).

More under-graduate engineering courses were added later: Electronics and Communication Engineering (1971), Mining Engineering (1984), Computer Engineering (1986), Information Technology Engineering (2000) and Artificial Intelligence Engineering (2021). In 1980, KREC came under the affiliation of Mangalore University, and the five-year under-graduate courses were shortened to four-years. On 26 June 2002, it was elevated to the status of a National Institute of Technology and has been called NIT Karnataka (NITK) ever since. It is now a Deemed University. NITK celebrated its 50th Institute Foundation day on 6 August 2009. The year-long Golden Jubilee celebrations were inaugurated on 10 August 2009.

== Campus ==
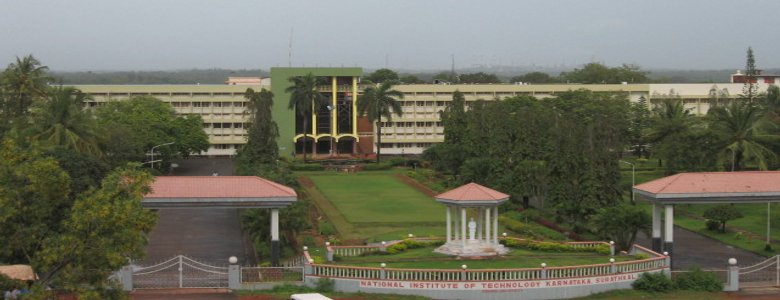
NITK Main Building in Surathkal, Mangalore

The 295.35-acre (1.1952 km^{2}) campus is located on National Highway 66 (formerly National Highway 17), by the shores of Arabian Sea. It has a private beach, including a lighthouse. Almost all the students reside on-campus, as do most of the staff. Staff quarters consist of the Director's quarters, Professors & Assistant Professors quarters, Lecturers & Assistant Lecturers quarters, Warden quarters, bachelors quarters and non-teaching staff colony. There are more than 200 residences on campus including independent houses and flats.

The campus includes a Cooperative Society and a marketing center. Both State Bank of India and Canara Bank have branches in the campus along with ATM facility. The Central Library has a floor area of 2,758 m^{2}, and its three reading halls can accommodate a total of 600 students. The Central Computer Centre, established in 1995 as a supporting facility, maintains the network backbone of the college and has computer labs that augment the computing facilities in the teaching departments.

Apart from the above, the campus also houses a staff club, a post office, two schools (Kannada and English medium), guest houses, a food court, a swimming pool and playgrounds. These facilities are made available to both the staff and the students at NITK. There is also an open air theatre for the student activities.

== Organisation and administration ==
=== Former principals ===
- A. S. Adke
- B. H. Karakaraddi
- K. Mahadevan
- B. S. Basavarajaiah
- T. Ramachandran
- N. R. Shetty
- B. T. Nijaguna
- P. Sudhakara Shetty
- P. N. Singh
- M. R. Pranesh

=== Former directors ===
- P. N. Singh
- S. S. Murthy
- H. V. Sudhaker Nayak
- Y. V. Rao
- G. K. Shivakumar
- Sandeep Sancheti
- Swapan Bhattacharya
- Srinivasan Sundarrajan
- Kannur N. Lokesh
- Karanam Uma Maheshwar Rao
- Udaykumar R. Yaragatti
- Prasad Krishna

== Academics ==
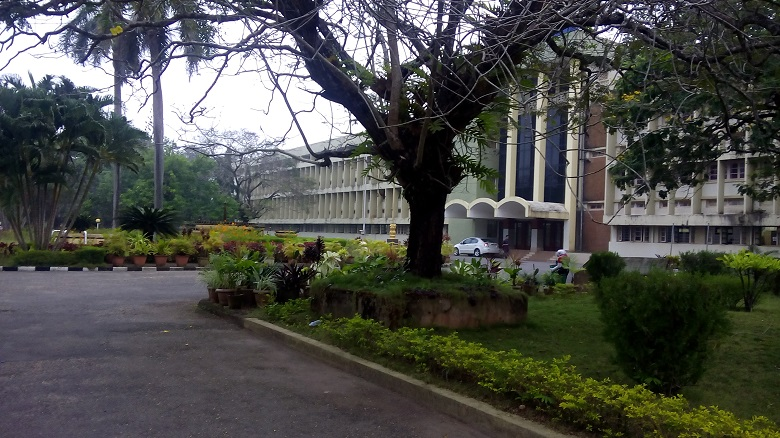
Main block of the college seen from front left.

NITK Surathkal offers undergraduate and graduate programs in Engineering, Science and Management. The institute has 14 departments and 11 support centres with about 200 faculty members, 300 support staff, 5,500 students and 26,500 alumni worldwide.

=== Admissions ===
Undergraduate programs

The B. Tech admissions are based on the JEE (Joint Entrance Exam). The exam consists of three sections on Mathematics, Physics and Chemistry. From the 2013 academic year onwards, admission is through the JEE (Mains) test, and ranks are based on 60% of the marks scored in the test, and 40% in the class 12/Second PU Board exams. From 2017, admission is through the ranks based solely on the JEE (mains) test; the marks in the class 12 board exams serves as a cut off.

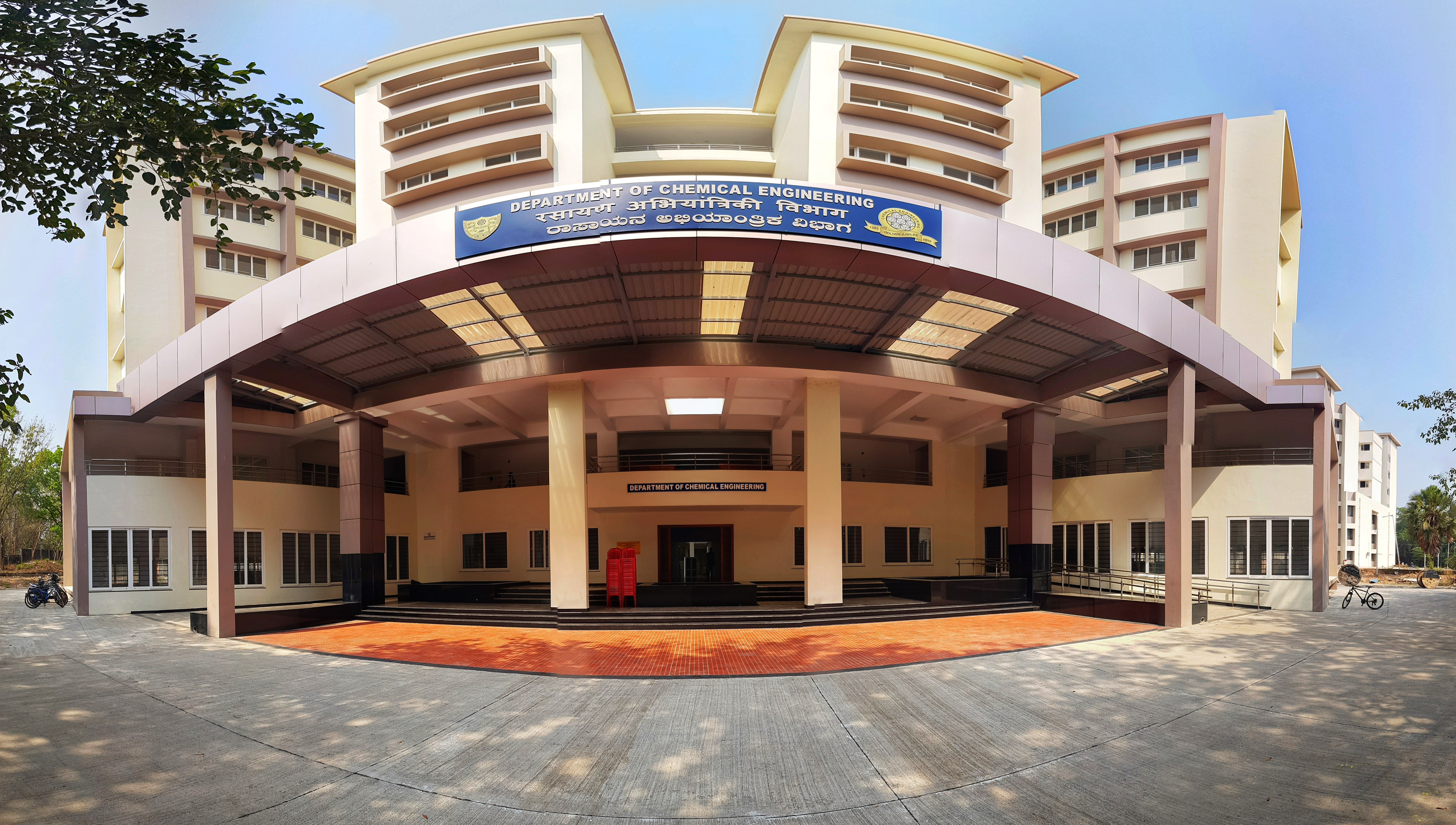
Chemical Engineering Department

Undergraduate admissions were based on a state wise reciprocal system. 50% of the seats were reserved for students from the home state of Karnataka. Until 2007, the rest of the 50% was distributed over other NITs, with each state having a fixed quota of seats. However, since the batch starting in 2008, the remaining 50% has been made open to all other states.

10% of the seats in the undergraduate class are reserved for foreign students under the Direct Admission of Student Abroad (DASA) scheme. Admissions are based on the JEE (Joint Entrance Exam).

Postgraduate programs

Postgraduate students are admitted to the program through the Graduate Aptitude Test in Engineering (GATE) conducted by the Indian Institutes of Technology (IITs) and the Indian Institute of Science (IISc). Postgraduate students are required to complete coursework in addition to a thesis or dissertation that entails independent research under the guidance of a faculty. Postgraduate and doctoral Ph.D. students are also involved as teaching assistants for undergraduate courses. An MBA course has been recently introduced by the Humanities department. NITK also offers MCA (Master of Computer Application) course for graduate students in which admission is done on the based on NIMCET (NIT MCA Common Entrance Test). NITK from 2003 is offering Doctor of Philosophy Ph.D. program for Mtech and other post graduate students.

=== Rankings ===
University rankings

General – India
- NIRF (Overall) (2024): 46

Engineering – India
- NIRF (2024): 17

NITK was ranked 16th among engineering colleges in India by India Today in 2020 and 8th among government engineering colleges by Outlook India in 2022. It was ranked 17th among engineering colleges by the National Institutional Ranking Framework (NIRF) in 2024.

== Research ==
Research in the institute is mainly sponsored by central and state government agencies with grants for the academic year reaching ₹10 crore (US$1.1 million). Faculty go on sabbaticals at foreign universities to encourage research and teaching interactions. Consulting activities are also conducted through the industry-institute partnership cell.

In January 2020, Indian Space Research Organization (ISRO) and NITK have signed an MoU to jointly set up a 'Regional Academic Centre for Space'. This centre will act as a facilitator for the promotion of space technology activities in the southern India and carry out advanced joint research and development activities in the area of space technology applications. The centre will pursue advanced research in the areas relevant to the future technological and programmatic needs of the Indian space programme.

== Student life ==
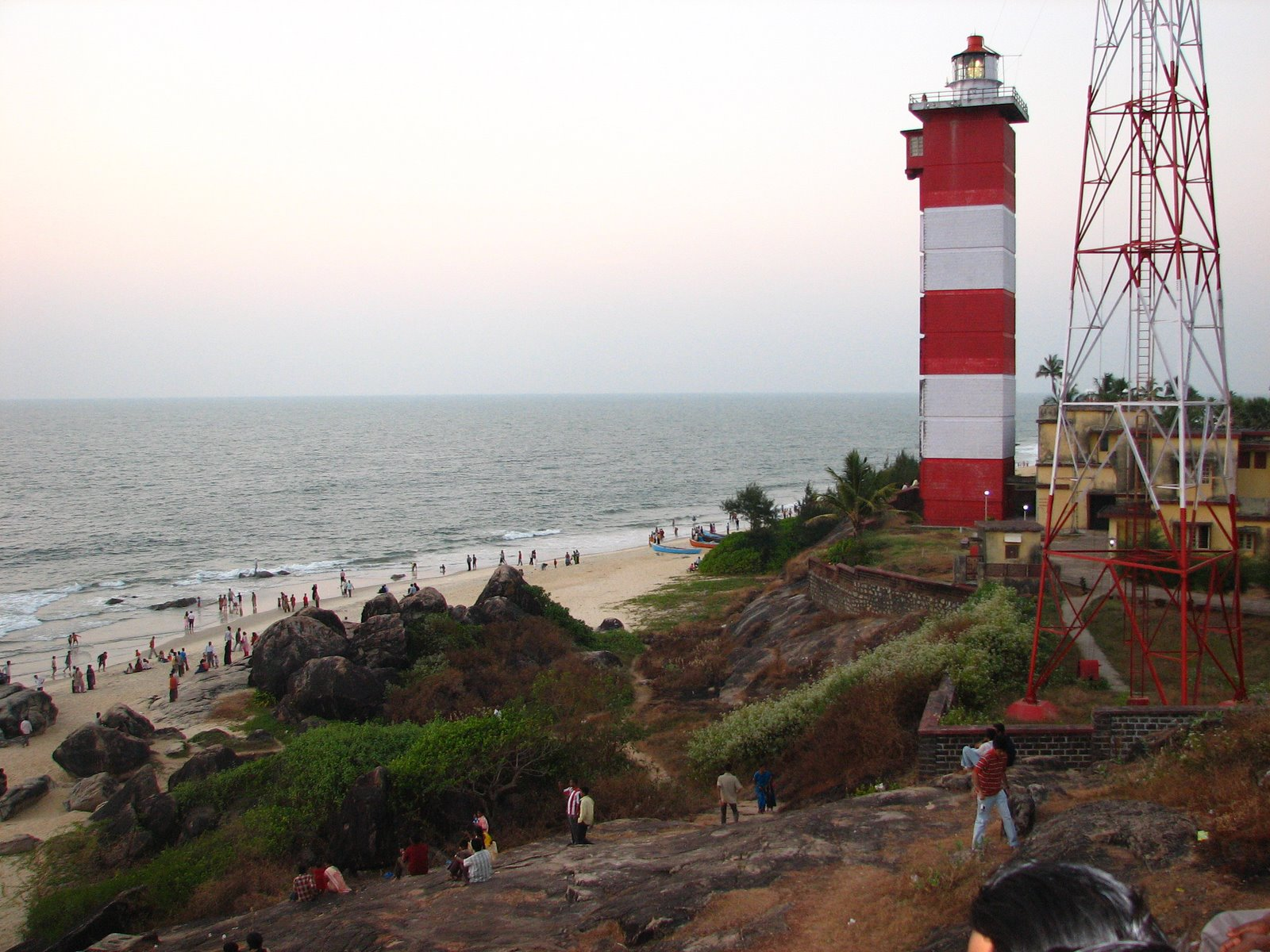
Surathkal beach is accessible by walk from the college

Being primarily a residential institution along with Surathkal beach less than a kilometre (0.62 mi) away, a unique culture has developed over the 50 years of NITK's existence. Since 2002 when it became a centrally funded institution, NITK has opened doors to students from all over the country. Students involve in technical activities, as well as cultural events supported by one of the many student-run clubs and organizations on campus. An open-air theatre called Student Activity Center is the venue for most of the music performances and movie screenings. Beach events are unique to NITK, with sand sculptures and kite flying being recent highlights.

Engineer (a national level technical symposium) takes place typically around the last week of October and Incident (a cultural festival) is organized since 1980 during the last week of February. Over the years, the scale of these events has gradually expanded with students visiting from all over the country. Online technical events at Engineer see participation from all over the world. The biggest intra-college event is called Crescendo, organised by the Reading Room Committee. Students teams representing the year of their study compete in literary, personality, art and music competitions. The college has numerous clubs, which have a presence both in India and abroad. It also has clubs like IEEE (Institute of Electrical and Electronics Engineers), ISTE (Indian Society for Technical Education) and ACM (Association of Computer Machinery), which are included in the syllabus as well for better understanding. These clubs help inculcate interest in technical research among NITKians. There are non-technical clubs like Rotaract (affiliated to the Rotary International), which help create social awareness and initiate campus drives.

=== Incident ===
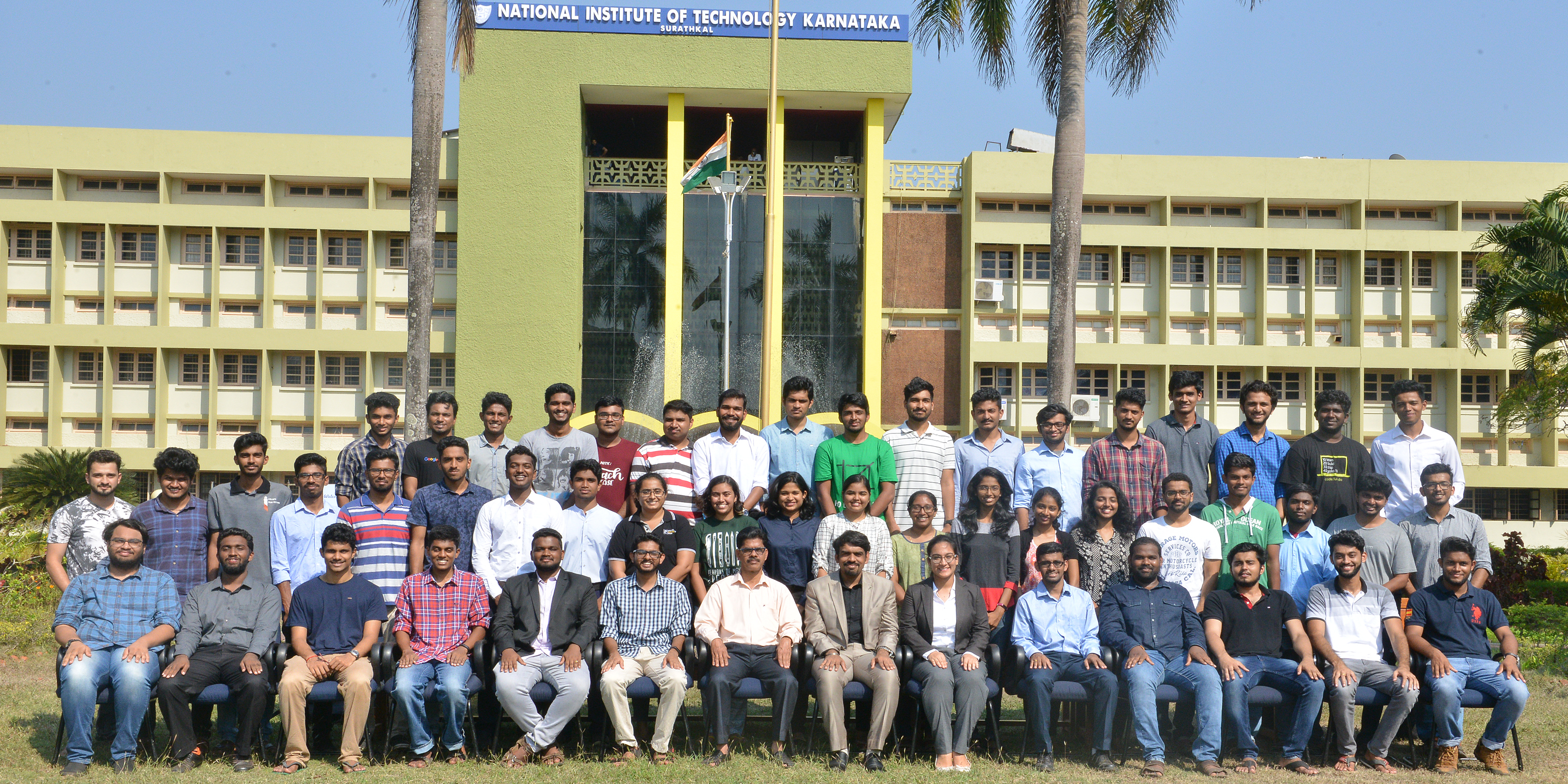
Team Incident '19

Incident is the institute's annual cultural festival. Incident was first conducted in 1980. Held over four days, the festival includes events from dance and dramatics to music, painting, fashion and quizzing. In addition, Incident Pro-Nite features top Indian singers and bands. International bands have also been part of the experience since 2010, with tribute bands like Led Zepplica, Breathe the Floyd Sound and Jailbreak performing crowd favourites to an enthralled audience. Some of the recent performances includes the likes of Vishal-Shekhar, Local Train, Amaal Malik, Kenny Sebastian, Rahul Subrahmanian, Raghu Dixit, Salim Sulaiman and many other celebrities.

=== Engineer ===
'Engineer' is the annual technical symposium at NITK Surathkal. 'ENGI' as it is called by the students has the Penrose Triangle as its logo, and this theme has been used along with the tag-line, 'Think. Create. Engineer.' 'Engineer' in its first edition in 2005 was born out of the amalgamation of three smaller scale technical symposia held until then. Engineer 2006 was planned on a larger scale, with innovative events including paper presentations, Shrishti, where participants are required to apply engineering for the greater good of society, robotics events (Perfect Machine, Automata), hacking contests, programming contests, electronics design events, and workshops. Socially conscious engineering has been a recurring theme. Guest speakers at Video conferences include Richard Stallman, Bjarne Stroustrup, Sam Pitroda, Dr. Devi Shetty, Sir Anthony James Leggett, Kevin Warwick, and Tim Poston. Engineer 2010 was dubbed the 'Golden Edition' due to it coinciding with the Golden Jubilee year celebrations. NITK hosted its first TEDx conference during Engineer 2011, and many influential speakers of the region were invited to talk on socially relevant issues. From the year 2018, Engineer has also hosted its annual NITK Model United Nations conference where the committees focus on various pressing issues around the globe and have a committee which focuses on the theme of the fest.

=== Student organizations ===
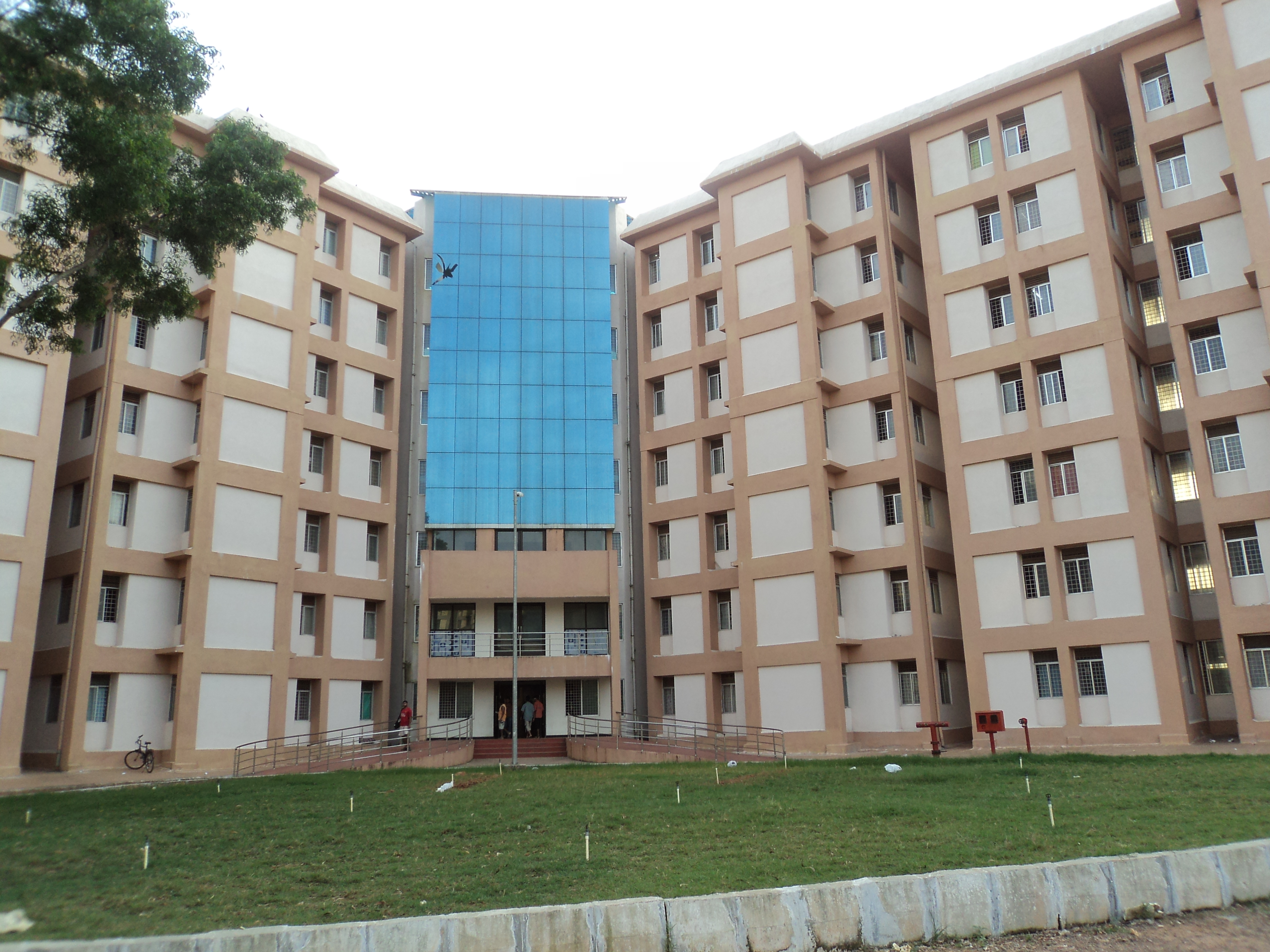
A hostel block of the college.

Technical clubs

Major national and international technical societies have set up local student chapters at NITK. They include Indian Society for Technical Education (ISTE), the Institution of Engineers (India), the Institution of Engineering and Technology (IET), the Association for Computing Machinery (ACM) (formerly chartered to Computer Society of India), and the Institute of Electrical and Electronics Engineers (IEEE).

- The Society of Automotive Engineers (SAE) has an active chapter constituted by Mechanical Engineering students. NITK has two racing teams which participate in SAE BAJA and international FSAE races.
- The Flying and Robotics Club (FARC) of NITK is a group of hobby RC and robot enthusiasts. Their annual flagship event 'Wright Flight' attracts participants from all over Karnataka. a Members involve in presenting seminars on various levels of robotics to participating in renowned tech-fests like Techfest, IITB, Shaastra, IITM, etc. As of 2017, a team of students participate in Robocon India representing the college.
- NITK has a Linux Users Group, which along with the WEB Enthusiasts Club promotes FOSS and Linux.
- The Engineers' Forum for Entrepreneurship Awareness (E-FOREA) encourages entrepreneurial ideas from students and promotes leadership and entrepreneurship on campus. E-FOREA is now renamed as Entrepreneurship Cell (E-Cell). E-Cell hosts an annual Entrepreneurship Summit (E-Summit). The latest edition of E-Summit was held from 15 to 17 January 2021.
- The Amateur Astronomy Club (formerly the Star Gazing Club) conducts star-watching shows for the students and faculty. It also happens to be the oldest club in NITK.

Cultural clubs

- The Rotaract Club conducts social, cultural and technical events for the students and club members alike. These include blood donation camps, clothing donation drives, coastal clean-up camps, and events conducted by the National Service Scheme (NSS) chapter of NITK.
- The Mangalore chapter of the Society for Promotion of Indian Classical Music and Culture Among Youth (SPICMACAY) is centered at NITK and is one of the biggest chapters in the country. It organizes concerts and lectures by maestros of Indian classical art forms and strives to raise awareness of Indian culture in the surrounding regions through lectures, orientations and conventions.
- Literary, Stage and Debating Society is the apex literary forum of the institute. The club mainly conducts quizzes while also holding debates and organising plays. LSD was formed in 2004 from the quiz club to cater to literary events other than quizzes. It is the largest club at NITK Surathkal and consists of 5 Special Interest Groups (SIGs) - Lit Gig, for Literary and writing events, Stage for theater, they host the annual "In a Nutshell", a series of 5 short plays, the Debate society - which focuses on public speaking, parliamentary debating and Model United Nations, Quiz which organizes quizzes on a plethora of topics and Film, which makes short films and increases the culture and interest in film making.
- Dance Dramatics and Fashion Club organises 'Spandan' annually, which provides students a platform to showcase their talent at dance and theatre. The NITK Music Club organises music shows, generally called Musical Night, and play popular music at the outdoor auditoriums. A variety of styles are on display at these events, from Indian classical music to fusion to rock.
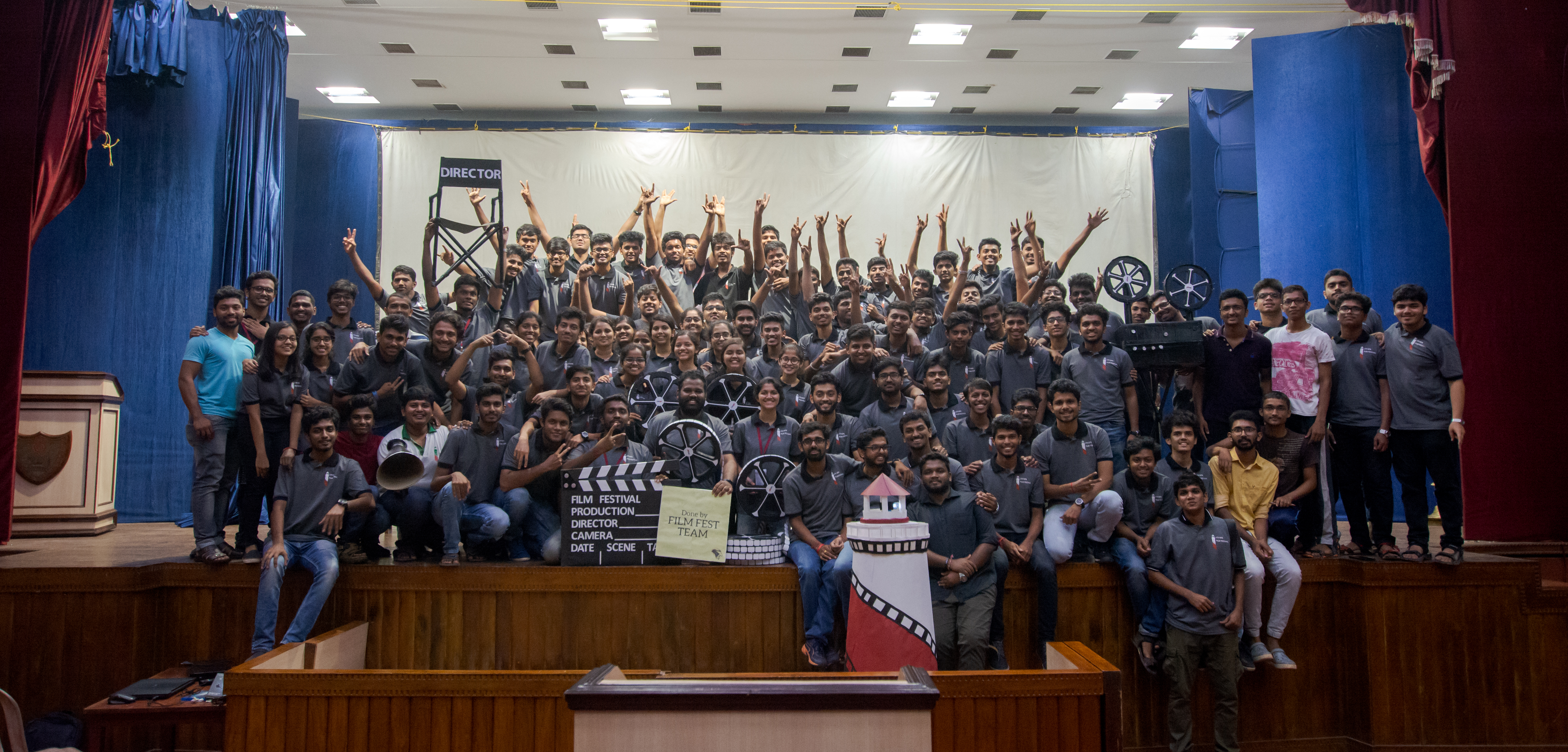
- Film Festival '18 team
  The NITK Films Club screens movies at the Students' Activity Centre every Friday during the semester. Apart from English and Hindi releases, regional films are shown as well. The Press Club brings out a fortnightly wall magazine News Wagon, providing a tongue-in-cheek look at life around the campus, besides bringing out the official yearbook, The Vitruvian.
- VOICE (Vedic Oasis for Inspiration, Culture and Education) is a youth group run by the students, for the students. Using the principles present in the ancient Vedic scriptures, they train students in a blend of character and competence. VOICE Club every year celebrates Rama Navami and Krishna Janmashtami. These two celebrations include worship of the Lord, music, dance, drama, devotional speeches, vedic insights into modern life, lamp offering and a delicious feast prasadam.
- The NITK Photography Club captures photos and videos of events happening at NITK. It conducts "Expose", which is a national level photography contest organised yearly during Incident. The club contributes to the official yearbook, The Vitruvian.
- The Artists' Forum, NITK is an art hobbyist club which conducts its own events like Art Beat, Kalakriti, and Waves. It is also credited with the decoration of the underpass connecting the eastern and western blocks of the institute. It added an abstract monument as a part of its annual project to the campus which is completely made of reused metal. Themed decoration of the campus during college festivals often comes under the prerogative of this club.
- Toasmaster India recently started its NITK Chapter.

=== Athletics ===
Sports facilities include the cricket ground, tennis lawns, badminton and table tennis complex, the basketball and volleyball courts along with a swimming pool.

The Recreation Committee (RC) of the institute organizes recreational activities including freshers cup, floodlit cricket matches. The much-awaited inter-year sports festival 'Phoenix' is organized during the even semester where students battle for gold, silver and bronze medals, and the overall shield. NITK sports teams participate in events all over the country as part of the Inter-NIT sports meet.

During the cultural festival 'Incident', NITK hosts 'Slam Dunk', an intercollegiate basketball tournament.

=== Entrepreneurship culture and NITK STEP ===
The institute has its own technology startup incubator named STEP (Science & Technology Entrepreneurs Park) which provides office space and in some cases seed funds to startups incubated there. NITK–STEP (formerly KREC-STEP) was first established on 31 August 1994.

Some notable startups founded by recently graduated alumni of NITK Surathkal are Practo, Delhivery, Nestaway, DriveU, Taxi For Sure, Chai Point, Simplilearn, BHIVE, Travelyaari, Pinkvilla. Practo is one of the startups conceived within NITK Campus and is now valued at half a billion dollars. Many NITK alumni are actively involved as Partners in Venture Capital firms like Clear Ventures, New Enterprise Associates, Peepul Capital, Benhamou Global Ventures, Lightspeed Venture Partners, Unitus Seed Fund.

== Notable alumni ==
NITK Surathkal has an alumni association called NITK Alumni Association (NITKAA). Notable NITK alumni include:

- K. V. Kamath, 1969, President of BRICS Bank, former chairman of ICICI Bank, former chairman of Infosys
- K. Ullas Karanth, 1971, Director of the Wildlife Conservation Society India Program
- Ashok Kheny, 1972, Director of Nandi Infrastructure Corridor Enterprises; MLA from Bidar (South) in Karnataka Legislative Assembly
- Thomas Zacharia, 1980, Deputy Director of ORNL Computer Science and Mathematics Division
- Pramod Madhwaraj, 1990, former minister, Government of Karnataka
- Audimulapu Suresh, 1984, Minister of Education in Government of Andhra Pradesh and Member of YSR Congress Party
- Rajeev Madhavan, 1987, Founder of Magma DA, venture capitalist in USA, on the Dean's Advisory Board at UCLA's Henry Samueli School of Engineering
- Sunil Kumar, 1990, Provost, Johns Hopkins University
- Pramod Viswanath, 1993, Professor of Electrical and Computer Engineering at Princeton University
- Sridhar Rangayan, filmmaker with a focus on queer subjects
- Neeraj Dangi, 1993, Member of Rajya Sabha from Indian National Congress
- Sreejith Ravi, 1997, Film Actor in Malayalam cinema
- Vasudhendra, Indian author
- Ghanshyam Tiwari, 2002, Indian Politician and National Spokesperson of Samajwadi Party
- Suhas Lalinakere Yathiraj, 2004, IAS officer and Para-Badminton Asian Champion 2020 Tokyo Paralympic Silver Medalist
- Nakul Abhyankar, 2012, Indian Playback Singer and SaReGaMaPa 2010 finalist
- Vishak Nair, 2014, Indian Film Actor appearing in Malayalam Cinema

== See also ==
- National Institutes of Technology Act, 2007
- List of Institutes of National Importance
- Indian Institutes of Technology
- Higher education in India
