= Ghanshyam Tiwari (politician, born 1979) =

Indian politician (born 1979)

National Spokesperson of the Samajwadi Party
- Incumbent
- Assumed office 1 January 2017

Personal details
- Born: 29 June 1979 (age 47) Secunderabad, Andhra Pradesh, India
- Party: Samajwadi party
- Education: NIT Surathkal; IIM Bangalore; Kellogg School of Management; Harvard Kennedy School
- Profession: Politician

Ghanshyam Tiwari (born 29 June 1979) is an Indian politician and the current National Spokesperson of the Samajwadi Party. He served as the advisor to the JD (U) government in Bihar from 2010 to 2015. In 2019, Ghanshyam contested the Lok Sabha constituency of Karakat in the general election. The seat was won by Mahabali Singh.

== Early life and education ==
The son of an Air Force officer, Ghanshyam was born in 1979 in Andhra Pradesh. He travelled across India in his childhood and later went abroad for higher studies. Hailing originally from Gorari village in Bihar's Rohtas district, he was schooled at various Kendriya Vidyalaya, then obtained his bachelor's degree in electrical engineering at NIT Surathkal. Ghanshyam did an executive management program at IIM Bangalore in 2005. He completed an MBA degree from Kellogg School of Management in 2011. At Harvard Kennedy School he earned a master's degree in public administration and public policy.

== Political career ==
- 2010–2016: Ghanshyam was Janata Dal (United) Bihar unit's chief's advisor from 2010 to 2015. He was also the communication advisor to the CM and party spokesperson until 2016.
- 2017–present: National Spokesperson of the Samajwadi Party

== Professional career ==
Ghanshyam has worked with global organizations like the Bill and Melinda Gates Foundation, Intel and McKinsey & Company.

== See also ==
- Suresh Tiwari
- Anurag Bhadouria
- K. C. Tyagi
