= List of villages in Udupi district =

This is a list of villages in Udupi district, Karnataka state, India, organized by taluk as of the 2011 Census of India. At that time, the district had three taluks, Karkal, Kundapura and Udupi. Since then, four more taluks have been created, Byndoor, Brahmavara, Kaup, and Hebri. The 2021 census of India has been postponed due to the COVID-19 pandemic in India, so these new taluks are not yet reflected in the census.

== Karkal taluka ==
- Ajekar
- Andaru
- Attur
- Bailoor
- Bajagoli
- Belenje
- Belman
- Bola
- Chara
- Durga
- Eedu
- Hebri
- Hermunde
- Hirgana
- Inna
- Irvathuru
- Jarkala
- Kabbinale
- Kadthala
- Kallya
- Kanajaru
- Kanthavara
- Kedinje
- Kerebettu
- Kervashe
- Kodange
- Kowdoor
- Kuchchur
- Kukkuje
- Kukkundoor
- Mala
- Marne
- Miyar
- Mudar
- Mudrady
- Mulladka
- Mundkuru
- Nadpalu
- Nallur
- Nandalike
- Neere
- Ninjoor
- Nitte
- Nooralbettu
- Padukudoor
- Palli
- Parappady
- Renjala
- Shirlal
- Shivapura
- Sooda
- Varanga
- Yellare
- Yennehole
- Yerlapady

== Kundapura taluka ==
- Ajri
- Albadi
- Aloor
- Amasebailu
- Ampar
- Anagalli
- Asodu
- Badakere
- Balkur
- Basrur
- Beejadi
- Bellal
- Beloor
- Belve
- Bijoor
- Byndoor
- Chittoor
- Devalkunda
- Edmoge
- Gangolli
- Gantihole
- Gavali
- Golihole
- Gopadi
- Gujjadi
- Gulvadi
- Hadavu
- Hakladi
- Halady
- Hallady-Harkadi
- Hallihole
- Halnad
- Hangaloor
- Harady
- Hardally-Mandally
- Harkoor
- Hattiangadi
- Hemmadi
- Hengavalli
- Heranjal
- Heroor
- Heskathoor
- Hombady-Mandadi
- Hoovinakere
- Hosadu
- Hosangadi
- Hosoor
- Idurkunhadi
- Jadkal
- Japthi
- Kalavara
- Kalthodu
- Kamalashile
- Kambadakone
- Kandavara
- Kanyana
- Karkunje
- Kattabelthoor
- Kavrady
- Kedoor
- Kemmannu
- Kenchanoor
- Keradi
- Kergal
- Kirimanjeshwar
- Kodladi
- Kollur
- Koni
- Korgi
- Kulanje
- Kumbashi
- Kundabarandadi
- Machattu
- Madammakki
- Maravanthe
- Molahalli
- Mudoor
- Nada
- Nagodi
- Nandanavana
- Navunda
- Noojadi
- Paduvari
- Rattadi
- Senapur
- Shankaranarayana
- Shedimane
- Shiroor
- Siddapur
- Tallur
- Thagarasi
- Thekkatte
- Thombattu
- Trashi
- Ulloor 74
- Ulloor [11]
- Ulthoor
- Uppinakudru
- Uppunda
- Vakwadi
- Vandse
- Yedthare
- Yedyadi-Mathyadi
- Yeljith

== Udupi taluka ==
- 108 Kalthur
- 33 Shiroor
- 34 Kudi
- 38 Kalthur
- 41 Shiroor
- 92 Heroor
- Achalady
- Adamaru
- Anjaru
- Aroor
- Athradi
- Avarse
- Badanidiyur
- Baikady
- Bairampalli
- Balkudru
- Bankerkatta
- Bannady
- Bellampalli
- Bellarpadi
- Belle
- Belpu
- Billadi
- Bommarabettu
- Brahmavar
- Chanthar
- Cherkady
- Giliyar
- Haluvalli
- Handady
- Hanehalli
- Haradi
- Havanje
- Heggunje
- Hejamadi
- Herga
- Herady
- Hiliyana
- Hirebettu
- Hiriadka
- Hosala
- Hosoor
- Innanje
- Irody
- Kachur
- Kadur
- Kakkunje
- Kallianpur
- Kapu
- Katapady
- Kattingere
- Kavadi
- Kemundel
- Kenjoor
- Kodi
- Kodibettu
- Kotathattu
- Kote
- Kudi
- Kukkehalli
- Kukkikatte
- Kumragod
- Kunjarugiri
- Kurkalu
- Kuthpady
- Kuthyar
- Majoor
- Manoor
- Marne
- Matpady
- Mattu
- Moodahadu
- Mudarangadi
- Muloor
- Nadur
- Nalkur
- Nanchar
- Nandicoor
- Neelavar
- Padebettu
- Padoor
- Padu
- Pajaka
- Palimar
- Pandeshwara
- Pangala
- Pejamangoor
- Perdoor
- Pernankila
- Pilar
- Santhoor
- Shankarapura
- Shiriyara
- Shirva
- Tenka
- Thopanangadi
- Tonse West
- Uchila
- Uliargoli
- Uppoor
- Vaddarse
- Vandar
- Yedthady
- Yellur
- Yermal
