= Prithveesh K. Bhat =

Indian Rubik's Cube speedcuber and artist (born 1995)

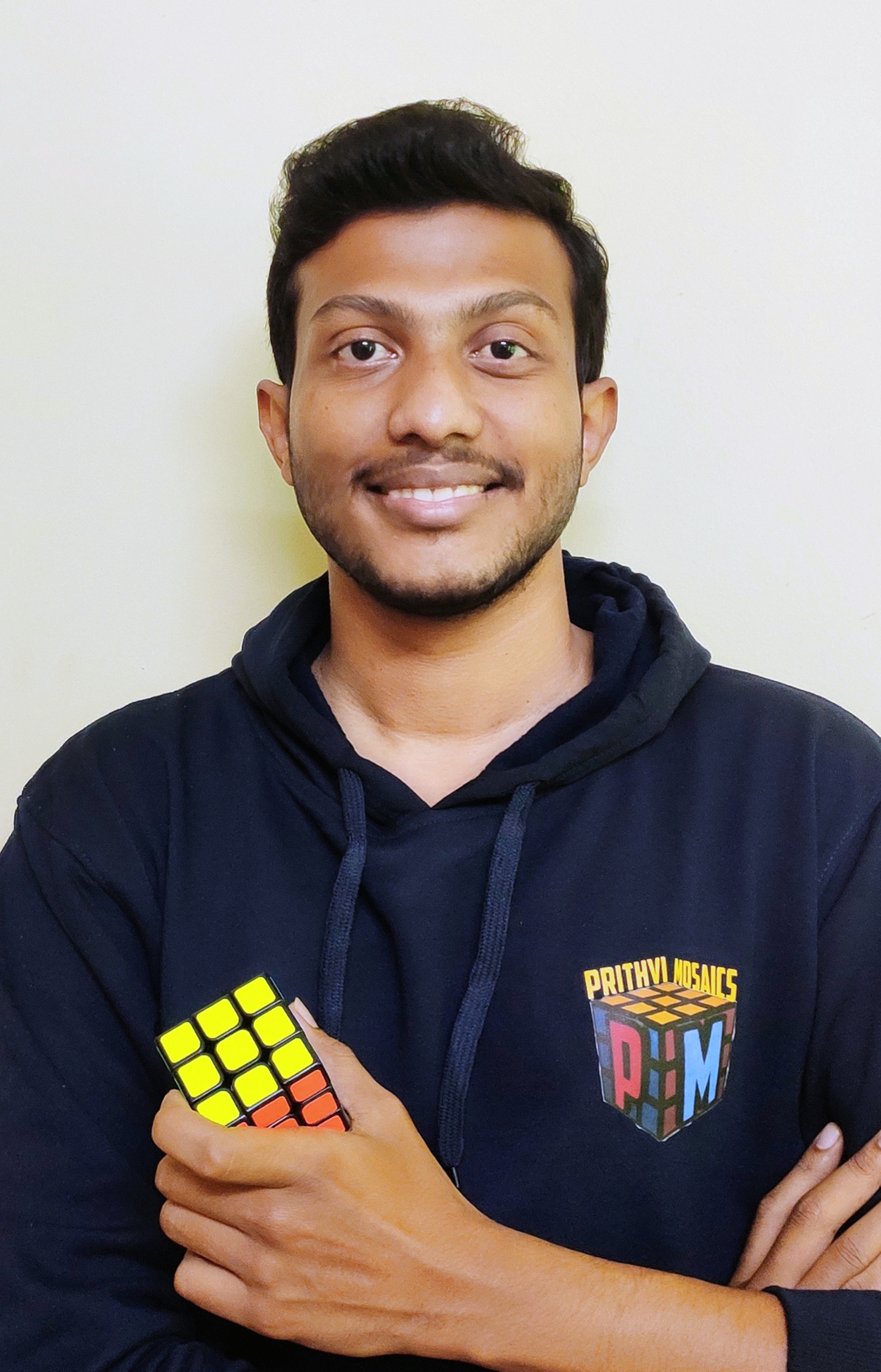
- Born: 23 December 1995 (age 30); Cherkady, Udupi district, Karnataka, India
- Years active: 2013 - present
- Known for: Rubik's Cube solving and mosaic design
- Notable work: Rubik Magic (book)
- Website: prithvimosaics.com

Prithveesh K. Bhat or Prathvish K. Bhat (born 23 December 1995) is an Indian Rubik's Cube speedcuber and mosaic artist. He has set several Rubik's Cube records, including two Guinness World Records namely ′Largest Dual Sided Rubik’s Cube Mosaic′, leading a team of 20 members and ′Most contributions to a Rubik's cube mosaic′, leading a team of 293 people.

He started pixel painting works to represent the same pixels over the graph sheet to create portraits which could be framed permanently.

He has trained more than 500 students on the basics of the Rubik Cube, and has conducted free workshops at eight educational institutions. In 2015, he wrote a book named ′Rubik Magic′, which consisted of a set of easy memorizing formulas for children to solve the Rubik Cube. It was released by D. Veerendra Heggade.

He has been featured in Star Sports Kannada - RCB Insider Show for making mosaic of Virat Kohli using 700 Rubik's cubes, while his brother Pradheesh K had dedicated an artwork of AB de Villiers. He was featured in History TV18's show OMG! Yeh Mera India - Season 8, for creating artworks of Deepika Padukone, Neeraj Chopra and The Joker. The show was hosted by Krushna Abhishek.

== Personal life ==
Prithveesh K. Bhat was born on 23 December 1995 to K. Shyam Prasad and Prasanna Prasad, both residents of Pethri, Udupi. He has a younger brother named Pradheesh K. Prithveesh is currently studying Master of Engineering in School of Information Sciences, Manipal.

== Achievements ==
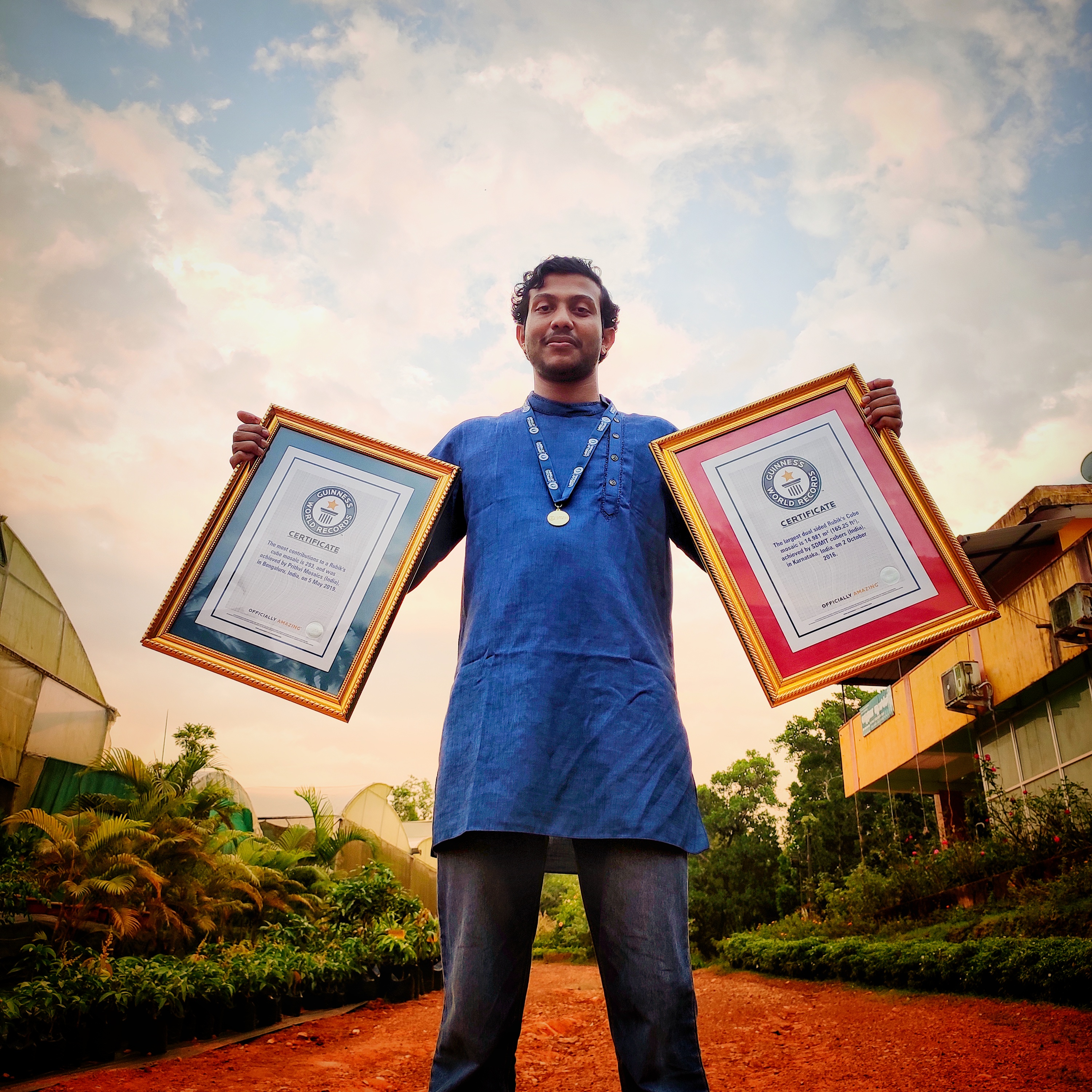
Prithveesh with his Guinness World Records certificates

On 2 October 2016 at Indraprastha Indoor stadium, Ujire, he and his team ′SDMIT Cubers′ of 20 members created a vertical Rubik's cube mosaic wall, which on one side portrayed the picture of Mr. Bean at yellow face and Charlie Chaplin on white face. It was made using white stickered cubes. . The mosaic wall consisted of 4500 3x3x3 cubes, measured 14.981 sqm, stood approx. 15 feet tall and 10 feet wide, and was built in 7 hours. The expenses were entirely funded by Veerendra Heggade. It was listed in the Guinness Book of World Records as ′Largest Dual Sided Rubik’s Cube Mosaic′.

On 5 May 2019, at Gopalan Innovation Mall, Bannerghatta road, Bangalore, Prithveesh lead a team of 293 people to create a portrait of a tiger, consisting of 1200 Rubik's cubes, to support the cause of tiger conservation in India. It was listed in the Guinness Book of World Records as ′Most contributions to a Rubik's cube mosaic′.

Prithveesh holds a world record for ′Dual-sided Rubik's Cube′ listed in Limca Book of Records. He also holds a Assist World Record, for creating a portrait of Abdul Kalam using 540 cubes.

He ranked 3rd in state-level Rubik's Cube solving competition (non-WCA event) held in Mangalore.

He has made over 200 portraits including those of Veerendra Heggade, Narendra Modi, A. P. J. Abdul Kalam, Swami Vivekananda, Mohan Alva, Ambareesh, Yash, Rakshit Shetty, Sudeep, Puneeth Rajkumar, Sridevi, Vishnuvardhan, Mary Kom, Darshan, and Yogaraj Bhat on various occasions in several locations in Karnataka and also in Hyderabad, Chennai and Uttar Pradesh.

== Events ==
- First Lord Ganesha idol made out of Rubik Cubes, at the ″My Friend Ganesha″ (Idol making contest) held at Bharath Mall, Mangalore on 27 August 2017
- Created a 8×10 feet mosaic image of the Parliament of India using 1,950 Rubik's Cubes in seven hours, on 26 January 2018.
- Created a 2×3 feet mosaic portrait of Anand C. Kunder using 540 cubes during event ′Thangali-2′, held at Shivarama Karantha Theme Park, Kota, on 30 December 2018.
- Participated and performed in India's Got Talent (season 8).
- Participated in Maruti Suzuki Colors of Youth (Season 7) in 2018.
- Performed with his brother, in two episodes of SAB TV's reality show India Ke Mast Kalandar, which aired on 18 August and 16 September 2018.
- Performed with his brother, in an episode of Colors Super's reality show Majaa Bharatha, which aired on 21 March 2017.
- Created Rubik's cube portrait of Puneeth Rajkumar, before the release of the movie Natasaarvabhowma, on 5 February 2019. The actor himself posted it in his Instagram profile, thanking the efforts of Prithveesh.
- Created Rubik's cube portrait of Yogaraj Bhat for his 2019 film Panchatantra. Bhat thanked the efforts of Prithveesh in his Instagram profile, on 8 March 2019.
- Created mosaic art for Hindustan Coca-Cola Beverages Private Limited, out of 7,400 mini Rubik's Cubes, in 2019.
- Created artwork of Dinesh Karthik using 600 Rubik's cubes. The cricketer thanks with retweet by mentioning 'Highly impressive' in his official Twitter profile on 4 July 2022.
