= Crossland College =

- Motto: Fear of the Lord is the beginning of wisdom
- Vision: Excellence in education and service to God and Man.
- Type: Private college
- Established: 2 July 1984
- Founders: Dr. C.T. Abraham
- Principal: Dr. Robert G. Clive
- Location: Brahmavar, Karnataka, India; 12°52′9.7″N 74°50′33.2″E
- Website: crosslandcollege.org

Crossland College is a tertiary education institute situated in Priority Highlands, in Chanthar village in Brahmavar, 13 kilometres (8.1 mi) away from Udupi and 73 kilometres (45 mi) from Mangalore, in India. The principal is currently Dr. Robert G. Clive from June 2024.
