= Barkur =

- Area
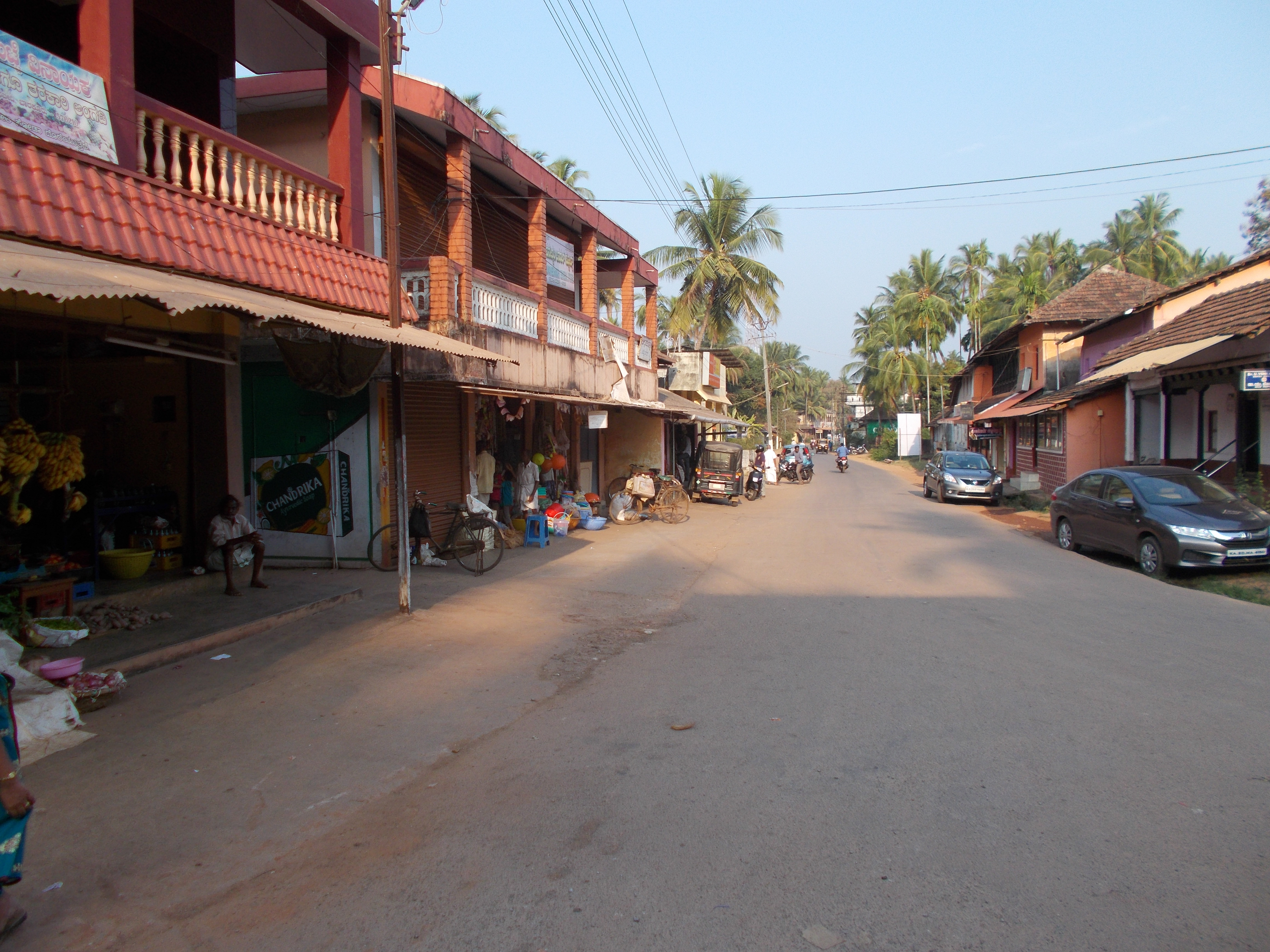
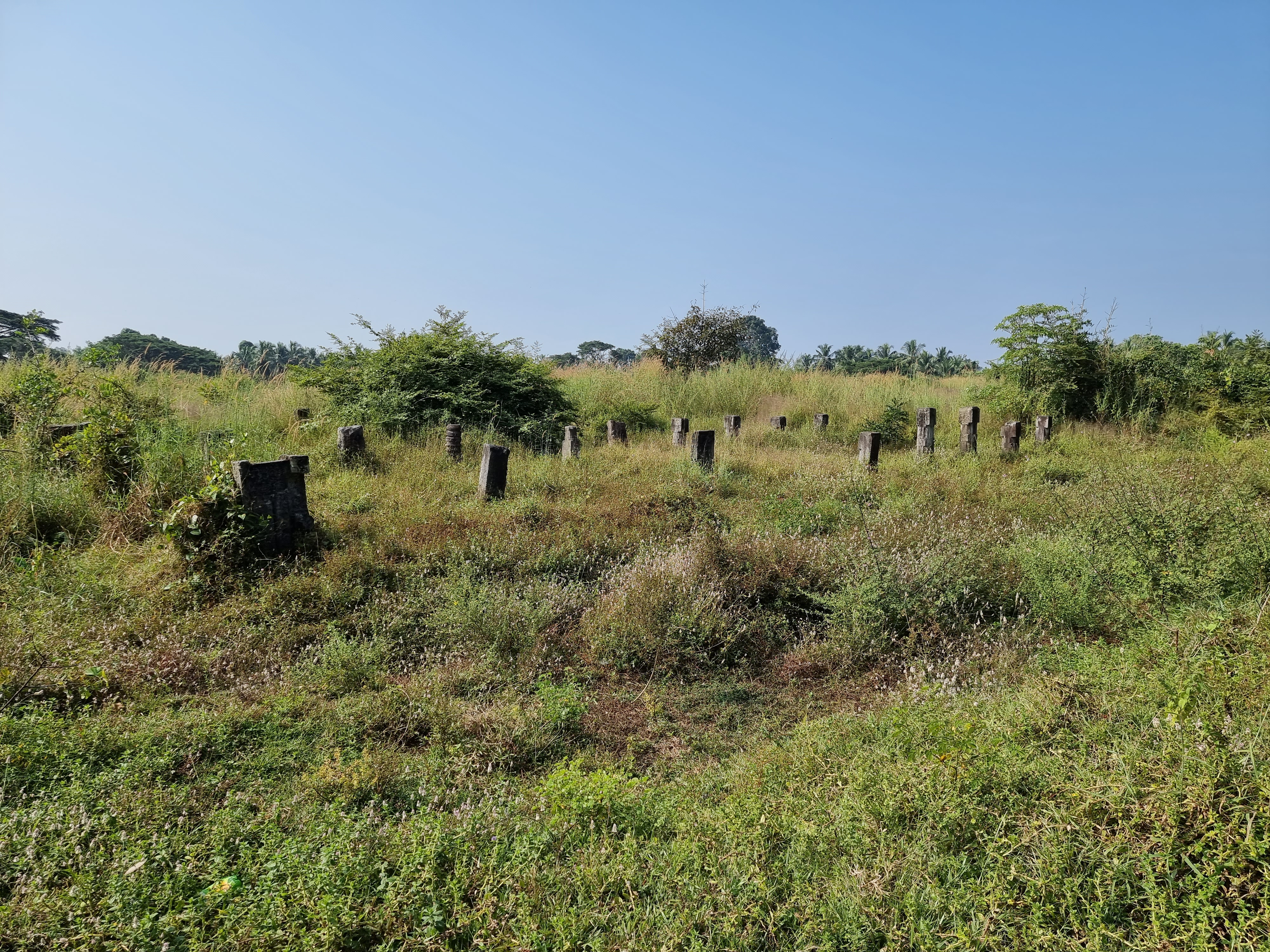
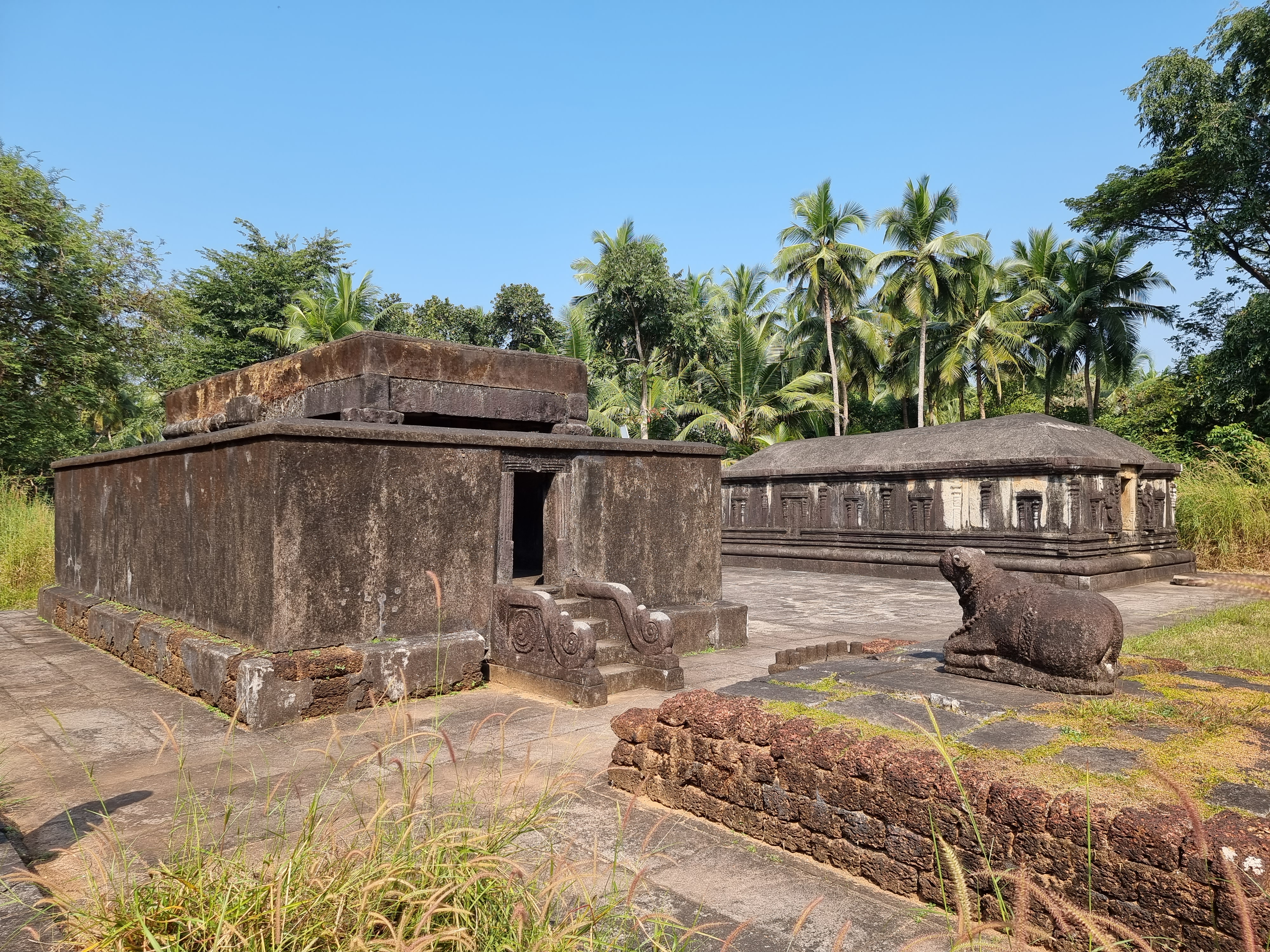
- Clockwise: Main town, Barkur railway station, Kathale Basadi, Barkur fort

- Location in Karnataka, India Barkur (India)
- Coordinates: 13.4668°N 74.7498°E
- Country: India
- State: Karnataka
- District: Udupi District

Languages
  - Local: Tulu, Kundagannada, Konkani
- Time zone: UTC+5:30 (IST)

Barkur (also spelt Barcoor) is an area in the Brahmavara taluk, Udupi district of Karnataka state in India, comprising three villages, Hosala, Hanehalli, and Kachoor. The area is located on the bank of River Seetha. It is also referred to as a "temple town".

Barkur is located 16 km from Udupi, another ancient city, and 3 km from Brahmavara, a taluk of Udupi. The Seetha River flows through Barkur and joins the Arabian Sea.

== History ==
Barkur was the ancient capital of the Alupa kingdom. It was known as Barakanyapura and later as Barakkanur. The rulers were known as Tuluva rulers. They spoke Tulu language. Many ancient inscriptions found in Barkur are in Tulu language. These are an essential part of history of Tulunadu. The Coastal Town of Barkur was also a flourishing port in the 15th and 16th centuries. At that time Barkur was referred as Capital of Alupa kingdom. Apart from the Alupa rulers, Alupa rulers made Barkur as their capital. Archaeological findings suggest that Barkur was a province under the Vijayanagar Empire in the 14th century A.D. Pandarideva was the Governor of this province under the regime of Harihara II. There are remains of two forts built by the Alupas and Vijayanagara governors. It was also a sub capital of the Hoysala kings for some period.

According to Kerala Muslim tradition, Barkur was home to one of the oldest mosques in Indian subcontinent. According to the Legend of Cheraman Perumals, the first Indian mosque was built in 624 AD at Kodungallur with the mandate of the last ruler (the Cheraman Perumal) of Chera dynasty. According to Qissat Shakarwati Farmad, the Masjids at Kodungallur, Kollam, Madayi, Barkur, Mangalore, Kasaragod, Kannur, Dharmadam, Panthalayani (Koyilandy), and Chaliyam, were built during the era of Malik Dinar, and they are among the oldest Masjids in Indian subcontinent.

== Temple architecture ==
The temples at Barkur have a distinct architecture. The sloping terracotta-tiled roofs bear resemblance to the temples of Kerala, but they do not have gopurams, a common feature of the Dravidian style South Indian temples.

=== Chowlikere Ganapathy Temple ===
Chowlikere Ganapathy Temple was constructed 900 years back, during the Chola Period. The Bairagi Ganapathy Temple is entirely hewn out of stone with a slanted stone roof and etched stone pillars. The stone walls of this temple display beautiful sculptures and it is apparent that this mammoth structure has withstood the ravages of time. The Panchalingeshwara Temple, dedicated to Lord Shiva, is Barkur's largest temple, and is one of the oldest in the town. Its double-storied gateway, with a pillared verandah on either sides, is most alluring. The rear side of the temple has an elephant-back-like curvilinear structure. The pillars that surround the circumambulatory path of the temple are decorated with carvings depicting mythological characters.

=== Kathale Basadi ===
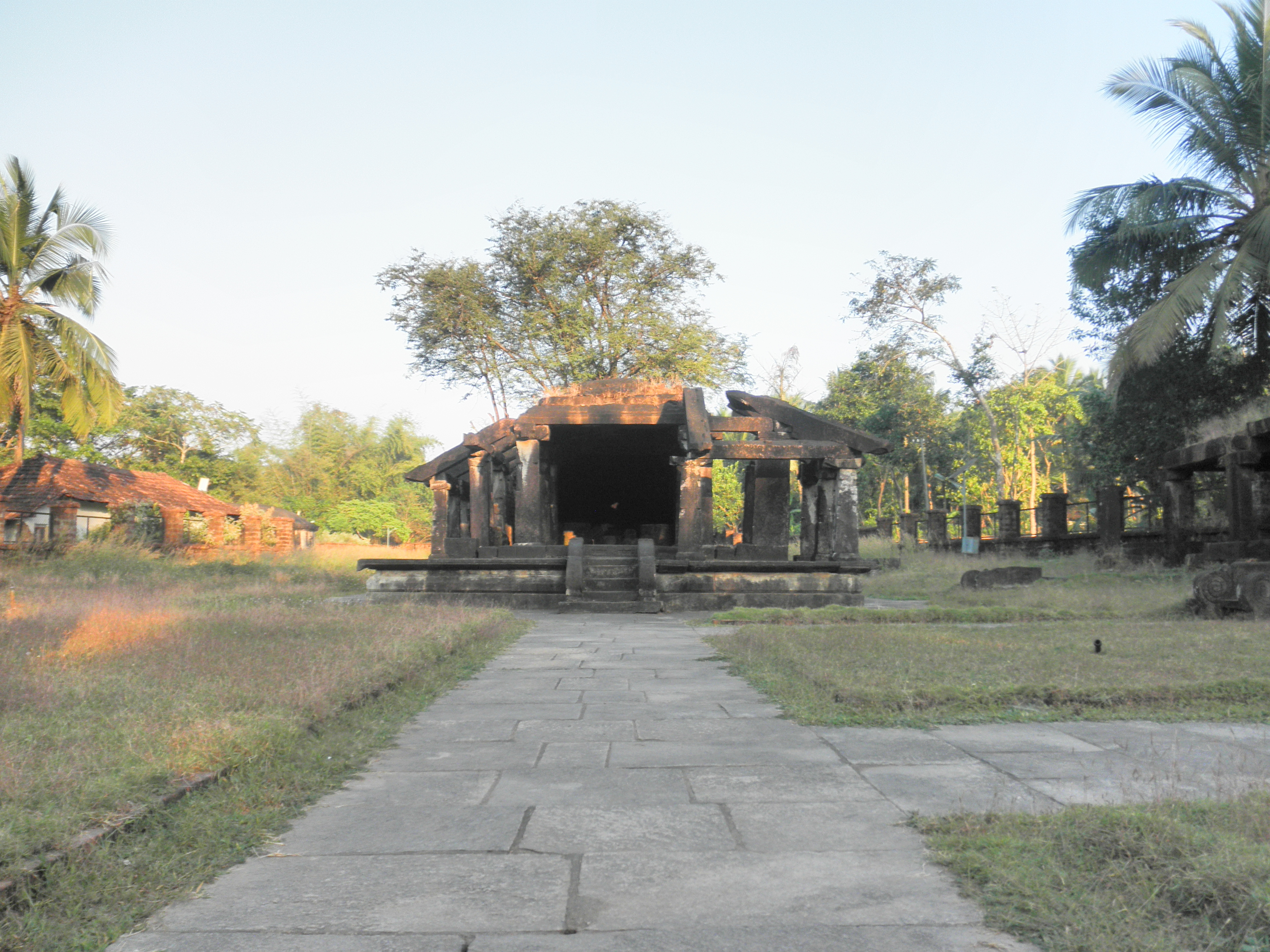
Kattale basadi

A 20-feet monolithic stone pillar is erected at the entrance. The temples were elegantly designed with carvings and embellishments, but are now in ruins. The twenty-four dents in the stone are the only evidence of the existence of idols of the twenty-four Jain thirthankaras. There are three main structures in a big courtyard with a victory pillar at the entrance. Archaeologists say that they were built between the 8th and 12th century A.D. Built by the Alupa rulers, the Jain Basadi, unlike most South Indian temples built in the Dravidian style, does not have a gopuram. The sanctum sanctorum is surrounded by stone walls otherwise known as Prangan, with sloping stone pillars over it. The original Mahavira idol was destroyed but has been replaced by stone tablets with animal figures that are a later addition.

Katthale Basadi consists of Navranga with Nagkaali, Shiva, Vishnu and Jain deities with separate temples. It proves the existence of changing kingdoms with various rulers trying to control the city both politically and in terms of religion.

== Barkur Fort ==
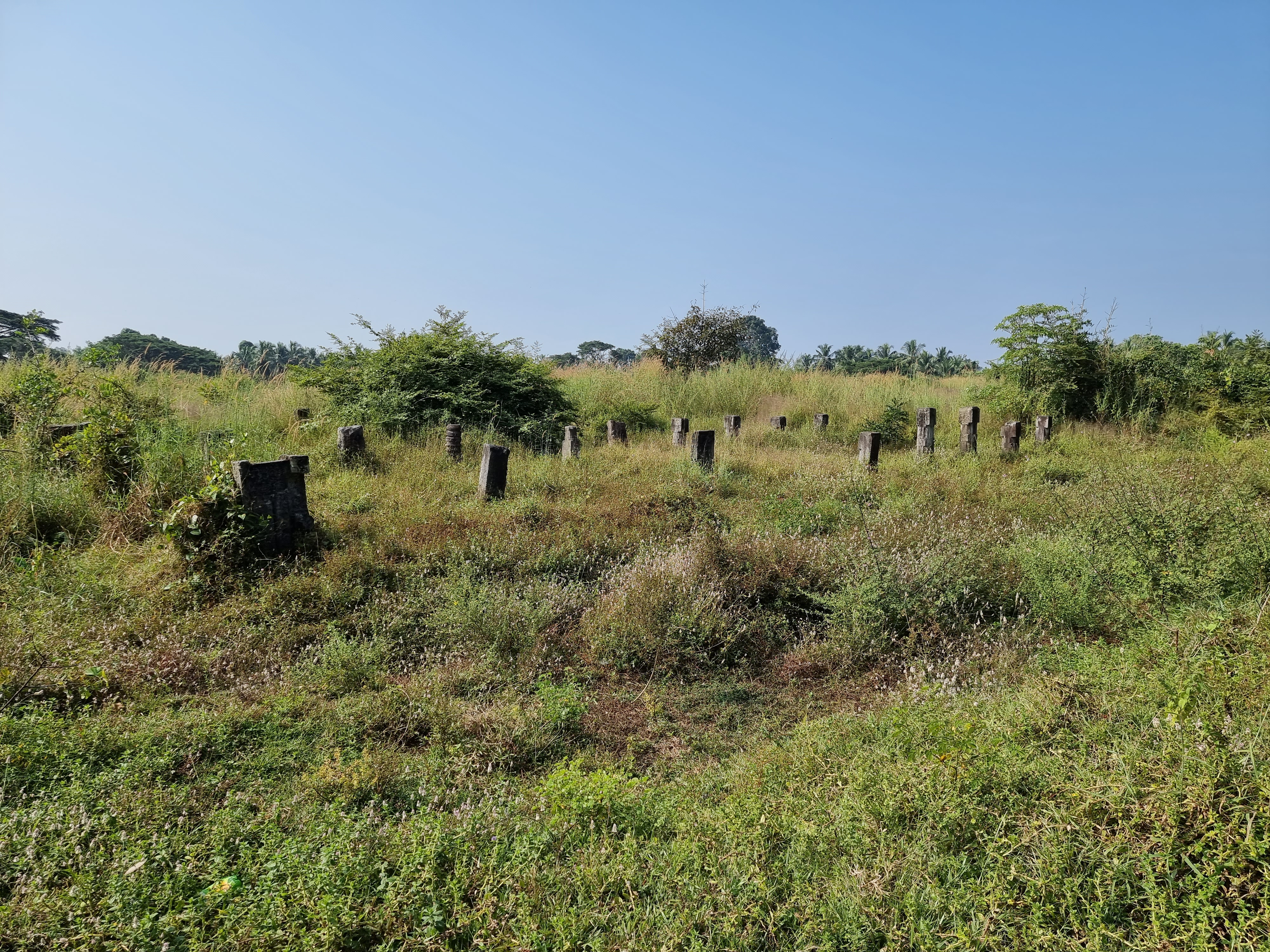
Barkur Fort ruins

The Barkur fort was built by Harihara I, founder of the Vijayanagara Empire. The Barkur fort is spread across 20 acres of land. Inside the fort there are ruins of the kingdom. There are pillars used to tie horses and elephants which formed the part of the army. This fort was excavated several years ago by the archaeologists in a few acres of land, which is now an excursion site.

== See also ==
- Tulu Nadu
- Hattiangadi
- Basrur
- Udupi District
- Brahmavara
