= Hemmadi =

Hemmadi Hemmady
- Village
- Interactive map of Hemmadi
- Coordinates: 13.6779°N 74.70°E
- Country: India
- State: Karnataka
- District: Udupi

Languages
  - Official: Kannada
- Time zone: UTC+5:30 (IST)
- Vehicle registration: KA 20
- Nearest city: Kundapur
- Lok Sabha constituency: Shimoga

Hemmadi, also named Hemmady, is a village on the banks of the Chakra River. The village is located in Kundapura taluk of Udupi district, in the Indian state of Karnataka.

The village is situated adjacent to National Highway 66. It is a junction from where a road goes to Kollur via Vandse. The historical Sri Lakshminarayana Temple is located in the village. Agriculture and horticulture are the main economic activities of the village residents.

== See also ==
- Tallur
- Kundapura
- Hattiangady
