= Thombattu =

- Village
- Location in Karnataka, India
- Coordinates: 13°39′51.4″N 74°59′10.3″E
- Country: India
- State: Karnataka
- District: Udupi
- Nearest city: Kundapur

Languages
  - Official: Kannada, Tulu
- Time zone: UTC+5:30 (IST)
- Postal code: 576227
- Telephone code: 08259
- Vehicle registration: KA-20
- Nearest city: Udupi
- Climate: Tropical (Köppen)

Thombattu is a village in Kundapura Taluk in Karnataka, India. It is in the Udupi district. It is located 45 km towards North from District headquarters Udupi. 26 km from Kundapura. 410 km from State capital Bangalore. Kota, Udupi, Karkala, Sagar are the nearby cities.

== Geography ==
Thombattu is bounded on the west by the Arabian Sea, and the east by the Western Ghats. Thombattu consists of patches of paddy fields and coconut gardens imbedded in a hilly and forest terrain. This place receives heavy rain fall from June to October every year, and the climate is tropical.

thombattu falls

Thombattu falls, photo by Avinash Shettigar

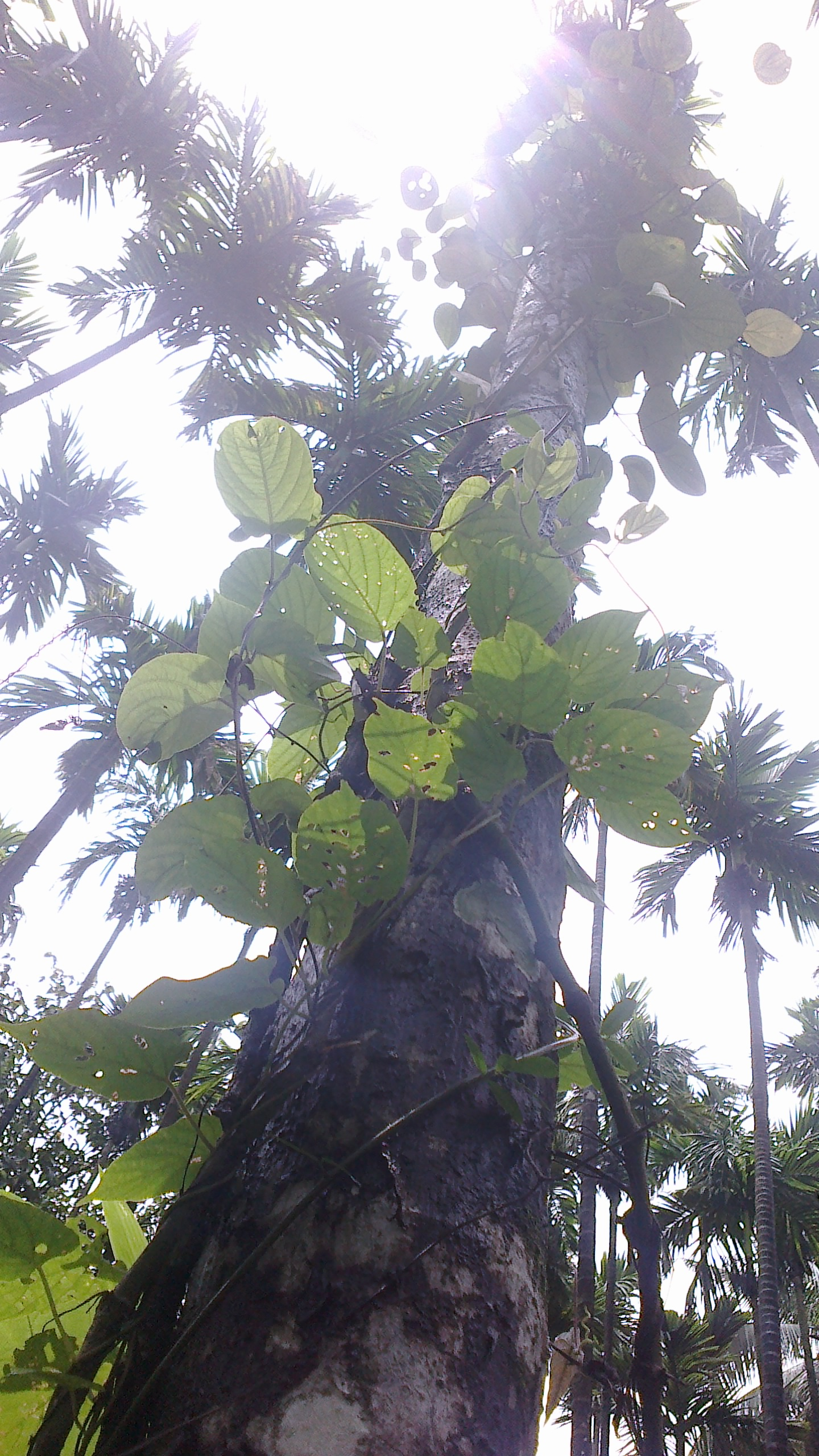
arecanut tree thombattu, photo by Avinash Shettigar

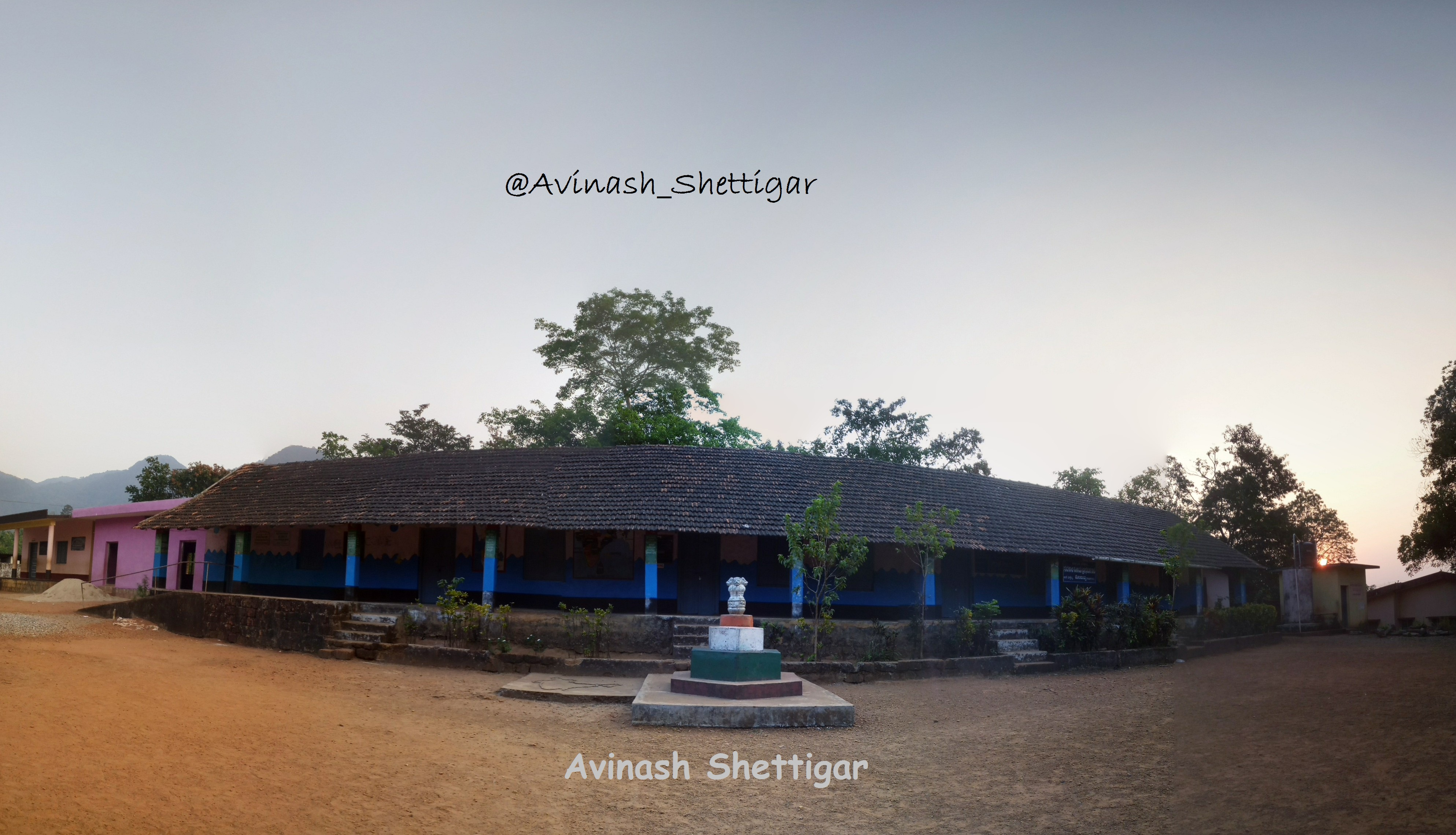
Government School Thombattu, photo by Avinash Shettigar

== Economy ==
The main economic activity of the village is agriculture: rice, coconut, arecanut and cashews. Rubber is also a main product.

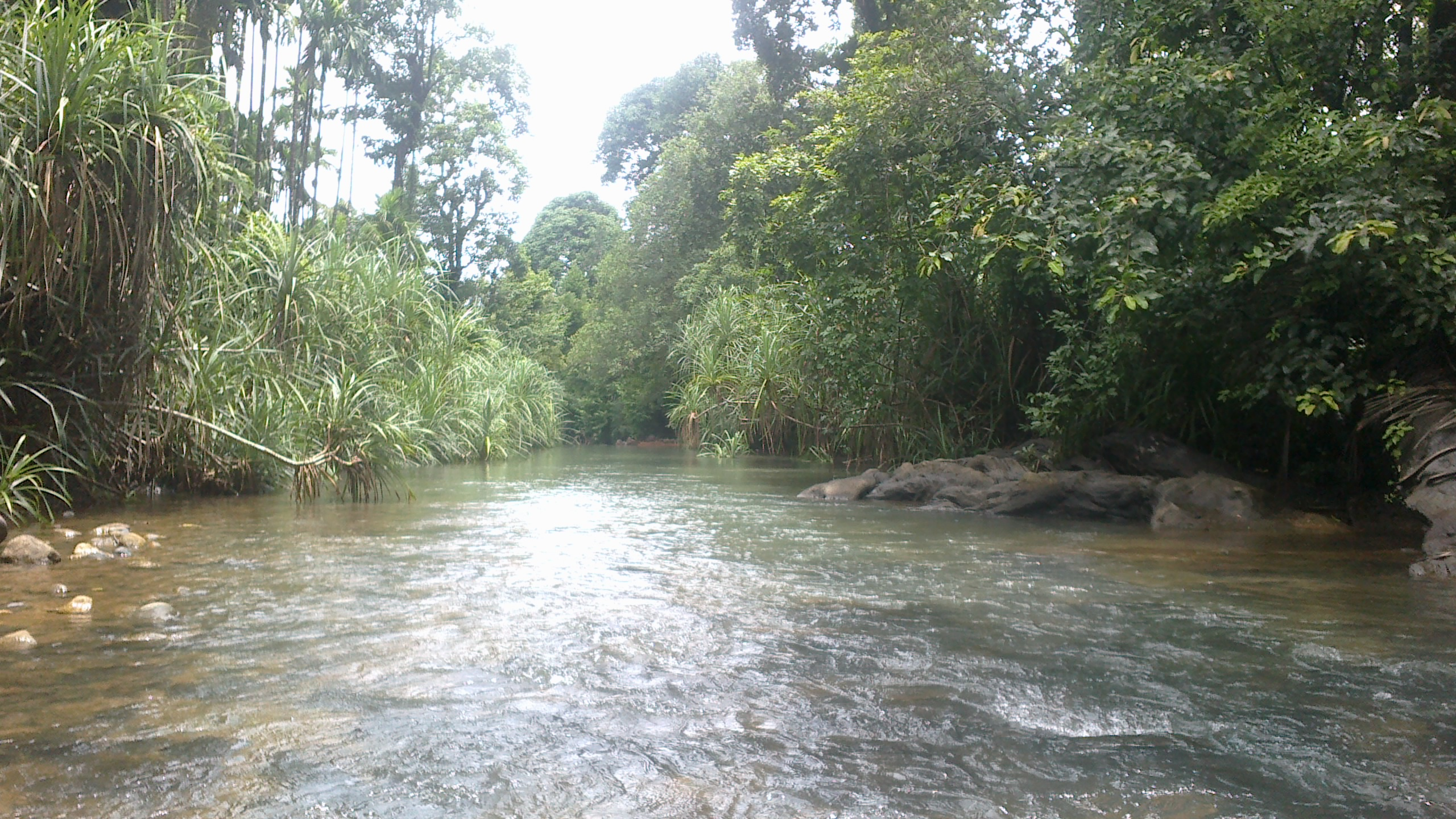
thombattu river

== Varahi River ==
The Varahi River, in locality it is called as Bagimane river or Machattu river or Halady river, flows on the northern side of the village and is one of irrigation sources for river bank arecanut garden. This river, which is also called Halady river, joins the Arabian Sea near Kundapura after passing through Basrur, a historical village. Flow in this river is greatly reduced after construction of the Mani Dam across the Varahi River, near Masthikatte. This dam is very near to Thombattu.

== Flora and fauna ==
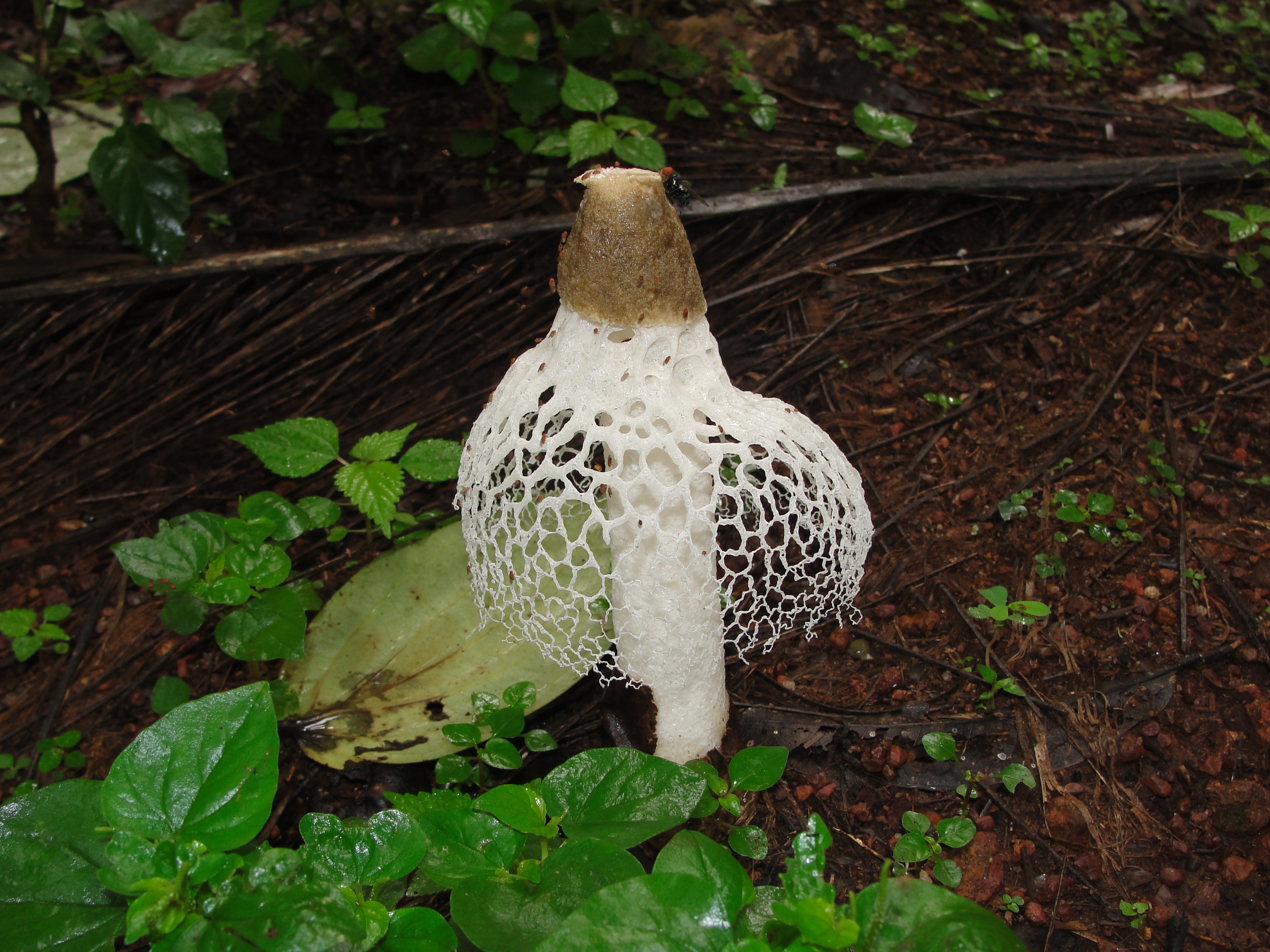
Phallus indusiatus, a beautiful mushroom found at thombattu

Thombattu is bound by the Western Ghats, a world heritage site. These forests are home for a variety of plants and animals, some of which are rare/endangered. The forests surrounding Kollur, Amasebail etc. are harbouring leopard, tiger, bison, cheetah, king cobra etc. are rare plants found include Rose wood etc. Mookambika Wildlife Sanctuary is located in the eastern side and is a thickly wooded sanctuary.

== Arts and culture ==
One Yakshagana, which plays dance-drama of 6 – 8 hours duration (full night) from November to May every year, in various towns and villages of Udupi district and surrounding districts. One organization called bajanamandali established in Thombattu it is Shri Mahaganapathi Bajanamandali Thombattu. This organization perform cultural programs in nearby place.

== Education ==
- Varasiddivinayaka Pre University College Keradi
- Canara College Of Nursing
- Moodalakatte Institute Of Technology
- mother Teresa school and college shankaranarayana
- government highschool amavasebailu

== Transport by rail ==
There is no railway station near to Thombattu in less than 10 km, although railway stations are accessible in nearby towns.

== See also ==
- Kundapura Taluk
- Gavali, Udupi
