= Achalady =

- village
- Interactive map of Achalady
- Coordinates: 13.5209°N 74.7594°E
- Country: India
- State: Karnataka
- District: Udupi
- Talukas: Udupi

Government
  - Body: Village Panchayat

Languages
  - Official: Kannada
- Time zone: UTC+5:30 (IST)
- ISO 3166 code: IN-KA
- Vehicle registration: KA
- Nearest city: Udupi
- Civic agency: Village Panchayat
- Website: karnataka.gov.in

Achalady is a village in the southern state of Karnataka, India, in the Brahmavara taluk of Udupi district in Karnataka.With the approximate population of 5000 people living in harmony with different caste, creed and religion. This village was ruled by Adara (ಅಡಾರ) family under the control of different Royal dynasties like Vijayanagara, Tuluva, Alupa, and many more who ruled South India and during British rule Adars were working for Madras State. After independence the Village is now under the governance of state and central governments.

== See also ==
- Udupi
- Districts of Karnataka
