= Hallihole =

- Village
- Country: India
- State: Karnataka
- District: Udupi
- Taluk: Byndoor

Government
  - Body: Village Panchayat

Population (2001)
  - Total: 2,328

Languages
  - Official: Kannada, Konkani
- Time zone: UTC+5:30 (IST)
- Postal code: 576232
- Vehicle registration: KA

Hallihole is a village situated in Byndoor Taluk, Udupi district, in the Indian state of Karnataka. The village had a population of 2328 as per census data of 2011, in which male population is 1103 and female population is 1225. Total geographical area of Hallihole village is 2930.23 hectares. Population density of Hallihole is 1 person per hectare. Total number of house hold in village is 495. As per the Census Data 2011 there are 1111 females per 1000 males out of 2328 total population of village. There are 1470 girls per 1000 boys under 6 years of age in the village. Out of total population total 1548 people in Hallihole Village are literate, among them 816 are male and 732 are female in the village. Total literacy rate of Hallihole is 72.92%, for male literacy is 80% and for female literacy rate is 66.36%.

The village has several primary and middle schools, and one Private school is there GLPS Devarbalu Hallihole. Most of the teaching is done in either English or Kannada. This village has one Grameena bank Karnataka vikas grameena bank Village has one Government Primary Healthcare Centre,

== See also ==
- Byndoor
- Udupi
- Kundapura
