= Kabbinale =

- village
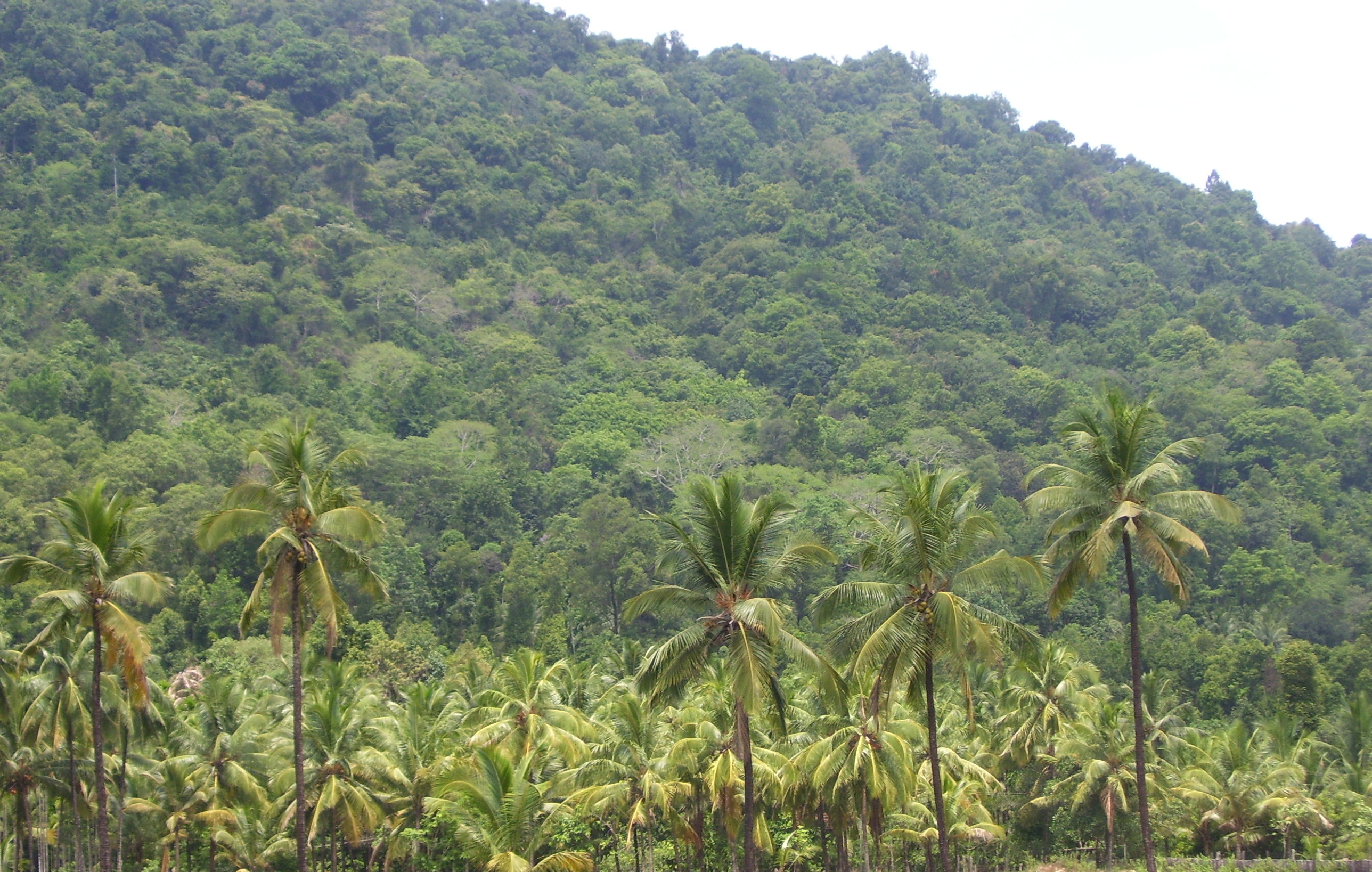
- Country: India
- State: Karnataka
- District: Udupi
- Taluk: Hebri

Government
  - Body: Gram panchayat

Languages
  - Local: Tulu
- Time zone: UTC+5:30 (IST)
- Postal code: 576112
- ISO 3166 code: IN-KA
- Vehicle registration: KA 20
- Website: karnataka.gov.in

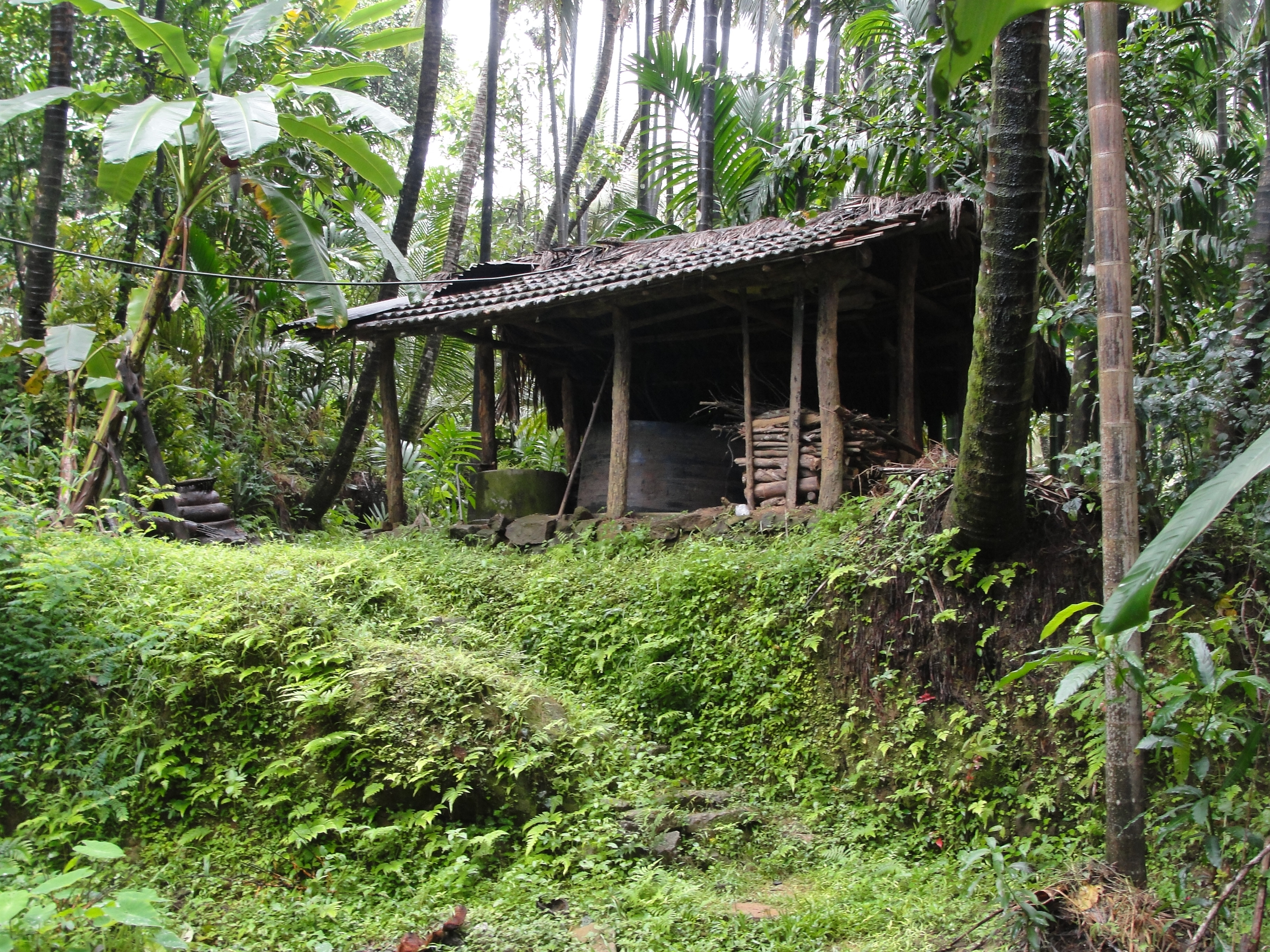
Simple Farm House inside areca garden at hilly region Kabbinale, India

Kabbinale is a village at the foot hills of the Western Ghats (Sahyadri) Agumbe range, situated in the Hebri Taluk of the Udupi district of Karnataka state, India. In the Kannada language, kabbinale means "crushing unit of sugarcane". The nearest airport is at Mangaluru, which is at a distance of 86 km from Kabbinale.

This small village is around 50 km from Udupi Town, and the nearest town is Hebri, which is around 20 km from Kabbinale. The area is covered by thick rain forests, evergreen, and populated by wild animals. The last settlement, called Kuchur, is around 1500 feet above sea level. Korth Baill is the highest, and last point of village Kabbinale. It can be reached from Hebri via Mudraadi or Bachappu or Ajekar via Munniyal.

Lakshminarayanage has been included into the Kuduremukha National Park Project and local people of several villages are opposing the Government's move to declare the villages, including Kabbiale, as tiger reserve. The highest settlement is Kuchoor. The remaining part of Kabbinale consists of several Houses where a number of Brahmin & non-Brahmin families are settled. Sthanika Brahmins are the Main settlers of the village with huge areca plantations and they are key developers of the Village Surroundings. There are many Malekudaya families settled in deep forest range. Honey collection is one of main activities of Malekudiyas.

The Lakshminarayana Temple Melumata, Gopalakrishna Temple Kelamata, Umamaheshwara Temple Ittugundi(Vittalagundi) are main temples of Kabbinale. Goddess Annapoorneshwari temple is also popular and historical in nearby Durga village. The top most settlement Kuchoor also has a beautiful small temple to the Family Goddess Sri Durgaparameshwari.

Bhootharadhane is preserved in the village as a part of Tulunadu Culture.All Daivas like Kodamanithaya, Parjurli, Malesaavira , Kalkuda, Marlu Jumadi is worshipped with great devotion.

Gunchi, Gubbimaru, Balegundi, Kelamedipu, Melumedipu , Shallabi , Peradabakyar, Govindabettu, Pullantu, Kuchoor are some popular families in forest ranges with big houses/ palaces.
