= Mudoor =

Mudoor Mudur
- Village
- Country: India
- State: Karnataka
- District: Udupi
- Established: Mudoor
- Taluk: Byndoor

Government
  - Body: Village Panchayat
  - Rank: No1village in Karnataka

Population (2024)
  - Total: 7,653

Languages
  - Official: Kannada, Malayalam Konkani
- Time zone: UTC+5:30 (IST)
- Vehicle registration: KA 20

Mudoor is a village in the Kundapur taluk of Udupi district.

== Demographic ==
As of 2011, Mudoor has a total population of 2973 people consisting of 1454 male and 275 female residents. The village occupies a total area of 6001.92 hecatres with a population density of 0.495 people per hectare. As of 2011, the total literacy rate was 72.55% which was higher than the national average of 59.5%.

As of 2011, Mudoor has an employment rate of over 45.95%, 92.17% of whom are employed over 183 days in a year.

== Mobile crematorium ==
The village is one of the first villages in Karnataka to purchase a mobile crematorium due to the village's distance from the closest crematorium, the Kundapur Crematorium Grounds.

== See also ==
- Udupi
- Kundapura
