= Kirimanjeshwar =

Kirimanjeshwara
- village
- Country: India
- State: Karnataka
- District: Udupi
- Taluka: Byndoor

Government
  - Body: Gram panchayat

Population (2001)
  - Total: 7,378

Languages
  - Official: Kannada
- Time zone: UTC+5:30 (IST)
- Postal code: 576219
- ISO 3166 code: IN-KA
- Vehicle registration: KA
- Website: karnataka.gov.in

Kirimanjeshwara is a village in the southern state of Karnataka, India It is well known for Shri Agasthyeshwara temple. It is located in the Byndoor taluk of Udupi district in Karnataka.

== Demographics ==
As of 2011 India census, Kirimanjeshwara had a population of 7454 with 3353 males and 4101 females.

== See also ==
- Byndoor
- Udupi
- Districts of Karnataka
