= Amasebailu =

- Village
- Interactive map of Amasebailu
- Coordinates: 13.6067°N 74.9376°E
- Country: India
- State: Karnataka
- District: Udupi
- Taluk: Kundapura

Government
  - Body: Village Panchayat
- Elevation: 74.676 m (245.00 ft)

Population (2011)
  - Total: 3,034

Languages
  - Official: Kannada
- Time zone: UTC+5:30 (IST)
- Vehicle registration: KA

Amasebailu is a village in the Kundapur taluk of Udupi, Karnataka, India.

== Demographics ==
In 2011, Amasebailu had a population of 3,034 people, consisting of 1,555 males and 327 females. The village occupies a total area of 5929.60 hecatres with a population density of 0.512 people per hectare. As of 2011, the total literacy rate was 68.33% which was higher than the national average of 59.5%.

In 2011, Amasebailu had an employment rate of 43.24%, 95.66% of whom are employed over 183 days in a year.

== Naxalite activity ==
Amasebailu was known as a Naxalite hotspot during the 2004–2006. This led to the establishment of the Anti-Naxal Center in Amasebailu which is one of the biggest such centers in the region. However, there has been marked decrease in Naxalite activities after being adopted by the Amasebailu Charitable Trust and Karnataka Bank in 2008. This, along with a lack of funding and interest from the government, has led to the abandonment and disrepair of the ANF Centre in Amasebailu.

== Infrastructure ==
Amasebailu is one of the first villages to receive the tag of being a solar powered gram panchayat in 2016. As of Dec 8 2016, the gram panchayat produces 60 units of solar power per day

== Geography ==
Amasebailu is located in the Western ghats and is surrounded by dense forests close to the Mookambika Wildlife Sanctuary. The village is one of the last stops in the Gali Gudda trial, a trekking path which leads to the Gali Gudda peak, a popular tourist destination.

Amasebailu is also close to the Machattu river (also known as the Varahi river or the Halady river) and is expected to see an increase in its agricultural productivity as a result of ongoing the Varahi Irrigation Project.

== See also ==
- Udupi
- Kundapura
