= Kambadakone =

- Village
- Country: India
- State: Karnataka
- District: Udupi
- Taluk: Byndoor

Government
  - Body: Village Panchayat

Population (2001)
  - Total: 5,120

Languages
  - Official: Kannada, Konkani
- Time zone: UTC+5:30 (IST)
- Postal code: 576232
- Vehicle registration: KA

Kambadakone (alternatively Khambadakone), is a village in Byndoor Taluk, Udupi District, Karnataka, India. As per the census of India 2011, the total population of Kadambakone village is 3806, of which 1819 are males and 1987 are females. The name comes from the Kadamba Empire, which once ruled this area. The livelihood of the people in the village mainly depends on agriculture and fishing. The nearest railway stations are Bijoor Railway Station and Mookamabika Railway Station Byndoor.

Kambadakone has a literacy rate of 75%. Some students quit school every year to work at the local fisheries and farms. The village has several primary and middle schools, one high school, and one college, Government Pre University College Kambadaone. The college offers secondary education in arts, commerce, and science with different specializations. Most of the teaching is done in either English or Kannada.

== See also ==
- Byndoor
