= Kedoor =

- Village
- Country: India
- State: Karnataka
- District: Udupi
- Taluk: Kundapura

Government
  - Body: Village Panchayat

Population (2011)
  - Total: 2,131

Languages
  - Official: Kannada, Konkani
- Time zone: UTC+5:30 (IST)
- Vehicle registration: KA

Kedoor is a village in the Kundapur taluk of Udupi district.

== Demographics ==
In 2011, Kedoor had a total population of 2,131 people consisting of 1,146 male and 161 female residents. The village occupies a total area of 636.88 hecatres with a population density of 3.346 people per hectare. In 2011, the total literacy rate was 73.06% which was higher than the national average of 59.5%.

In 2011, Kedoor had an employment rate of over 50.45%, 92.19% of whom are employed over 183 days in a year.

== Infrastructure ==
A portion of the Konkan railway track runs between Kedoor and Thekkatte

In April 2022, the Saligrama town panchayat proposed that a landfill (dumping ground) be built in the Kedoor region, which was met by opposition from the residents of Kedoor.

== See also ==
- Udupi
- Kundapura
