= Perdoor =

Perdoor Perdur
- town
- Location in Karnataka, India
- Coordinates: 13.384°N 74.904°E
- Country: India
- State: Karnataka
- District: Udupi

Languages
  - Official: Kannada, Tulu
- Time zone: UTC+5:30 (IST)
- PIN: 576 124
- Telephone code: 08252
- Vehicle registration: KA-20

Perdoor or Perdur is a town in the Udupi district in coastal Karnataka in the country of India. It is located about 20 km (12 mi) from Udupi on the way to Hebri.

== Places and Events of Interest ==
Perdoor has an ancient temple of Lord Sri Ananthapadmanabha in the center of the village which is known to be more than 1,000 years old. There is a pushkarani (water tank with steps on all the sides) attached to the temple. The temple is famous for the offering of 1001 (savirada ondu) bananas by people to the deity upon fulfillment of their wishes (harike seva). Sri Ananthapadmanabha car festival (or "Jatra") typically falls on 16 March and is energetically celebrated in the form of jatra. Many people join the festival on that day. Saviraprandh is offered during the jatra to Sri Ananthapadmanabha Swamy.

== How to reach ==
Frequent bus service is available from the district headquarters of Udupi. Buses plying from Udupi to Shivamogga, Bhadravati and many other via Agumbe route pass through Perdoor on the way to Someshwar via Hebri. Local transport is through autorickshaw and jeep. There are plenty of buses plying from Udipi to Hebri (via Perdoor). The average commuting time is approximately 35 minutes by bus (Udupi to Perdur). Surrounding villages are Bairampally, Bellampally, Bannapally, etc.

== Education ==
A high school, started by Manipal Education Academy, has provided education for children from in and around the village for many decades. Perdoor also has B.M Primary School, which was started more than 100 years ago and provides education up to 7th grade. The village also has one other Primary school called AP School. A previous B.M. School for primary education was re-branded and converted into an English Medium School. Perdoor has an Industrial training institute. For the past 30 years, Perdoor High School has admitted students from Doopadakatte, Alangaar, Bukkigudde, Paadigaara, Hathrabailu, Gundyadka, Kallangala, Santyaar, Alangaar, Donderangadi and Hebri. During the academic year 2011-12, a full-time college with Science and Arts degrees was founded, balebailu school of primary education is famous in perdoor village.
