= Gantihole =

Village in Karnataka, India

Coordinates: 13°50′N 74°40′E

Gantihole is a village near Taggarse in Byndoor Taluk,Udupi district, Karnataka, India.
