= Hoovinakere =

- village
- Country: India
- State: Karnataka

Government
  - Body: Gram panchayat

Languages
  - Official: Kannada
- Time zone: UTC+5:30 (IST)
- ISO 3166 code: IN-KA
- Vehicle registration: KA
- Website: karnataka.gov.in

Hoovinakere is a village in Kundapura taluka of Udupi district. It is the birthplace of Vadiraja swamiji of Dwaita philosophy. It is located near Kumbasi or Annegudde.
