= Kanthavara =

Kanthavara is a village in Karkala taluk of the Udupi district in Karnataka state, India. Kanthavara is located 9.1 km (5.7 mi) from its Taluk town Karkal. Kanthavara is 30.8 km (19.1 mi) from its District Main City Udupi. It is 286 km (178 mi) from its State capital Bangalore. A road from Manjarapalke goes to interior places of Bola, Beladi and Kanthavara as well. The well known temple of Lord Shiva is located in Kanthavara.

It is mostly a forest area with agriculture being the most important economic activity. Poultry, dairy, horticulture being secondary businesses. There is also the "toddy" (known as kali in the native language Tulu) business wherein toddy is tapped from the trees and sold in households or at the toddy shops. Beedi (a kind of small cigarette) packaging is also a small-time business. Fruits like pineapple, cashew-nuts, mango, coconut and others are grown there in their natural habitat. Wild boar hunting is a sport cum business where the meat is sold.
