= Hosadu =

Hosadu ಹೊಸಾಡು
- Village
- Country: India
- State: Karnataka
- District: Udupi
- Taluk: Kundapura

Government
  - Body: Village Panchayat

Population (2011)
  - Total: 3,261

Languages
  - Official: Kannada, Konkani
- Time zone: UTC+5:30 (IST)
- Vehicle registration: KA

Hosadu is a village in the Byndoor taluk of Udupi district. Before 2018, the village was part of the Kundapur taluk.

== Population ==
As of 2011, Hosadu has a total population of 3261 people consisting of 1735 male and 197 female residents. The village occupies a total area of 539.40 hecatres with a population density of 6.046 people per hectare. As of 2011, the total literacy rate was 75.77% which was higher than the national average of 59.5%.

As of 2011, Hosadu has an employment rate of over 37.38%, 98.36% of whom are employed over 183 days in a year.

== Violence ==
In 2017, the village saw an outbreak of violence due to disagreements over the slaughter of cattle in violation of the Karnataka Prevention of Cow Slaughter and Preservation of Animals Act, 1964.

== Location ==
The village is located close to the Sauparnika river.

== See also ==
- Udupi
- Kundapura
