= Navunda =

- village
- Country: India
- State: Karnataka
- District: Udupi
- Talukas: Byndoor

Government
  - Body: Gram panchayat

Population (2001)
  - Total: 5,496

Languages
  - Official: Kannada
- Time zone: UTC+5:30 (IST)
- Postal code: 576224
- ISO 3166 code: IN-KA
- Vehicle registration: KA
- Nearest city: Byndoor, Kundapura
- Website: karnataka.gov.in

Navunda is a village in the southern state of Karnataka, India.

== Demographics ==
As of 2001 India census, Navunda had a population of 5496 with 2502 males and 2994 females.

== See also ==
- Udupi
- Districts of Karnataka
- Kollur
- Murdeshwara
