= Kamalashile =

- village
- Interactive map of Kamalashile
- Coordinates: 13.7132°N 74.9166°E
- Country: India
- State: Karnataka
- District: Udupi
- Talukas: Kundapur

Government
  - Body: Gram panchayat

Languages
  - Official: Kannada, Kundagannada
- Time zone: UTC+5:30 (IST)
- Postal code: 576229
- ISO 3166 code: IN-KA
- Vehicle registration: KA
- Nearest city: Kundapura
- Civic agency: Gram panchayat
- Website: karnataka.gov.in

Kamalashile is a village located 35 km from Kundapura taluk in Udupi district. It is 120 km from Mangalore. Kamalashile is known for Sri Bramhi Durga Parameshwari temple. It is an ancient temple and frequent Chandi Homa/Yagna are conducted here. Kamalashile jathre is celebrated annually in April.
