= Kodibettu =

- village
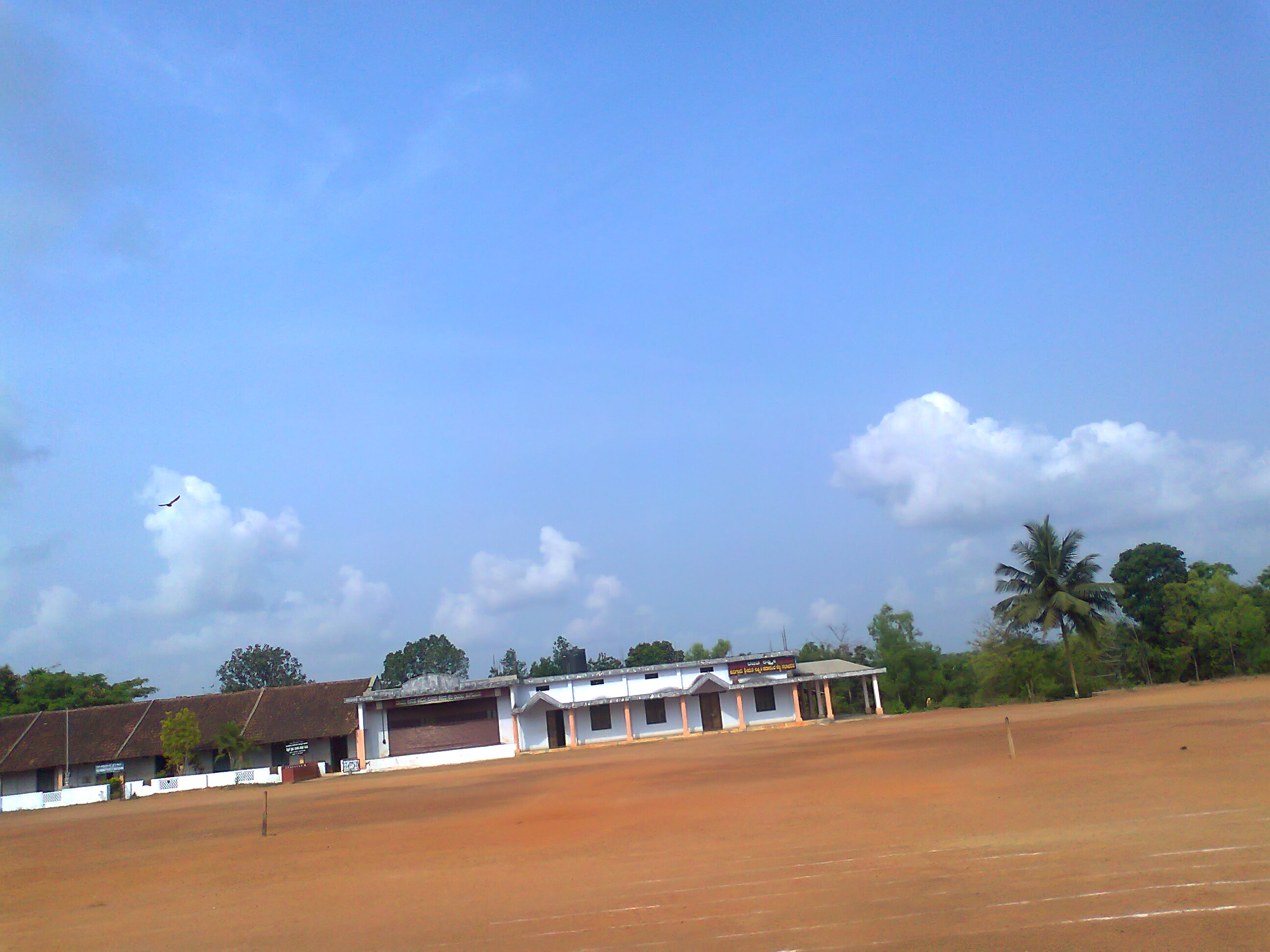
- Kodibettu
- Country: India
- State: Karnataka
- District: Udupi

Languages
  - Official: Kannada
- Time zone: UTC+5:30 (IST)
- PIN: 576113
- Nearest city: Manipal

Kodibettu is a small village situated on the way to Peranankila. It is nearly 18 km from Udupi. This small village has a Higher and a Primary School [Vishnu moorthy high school] in which many students from local and rural areas come and study. This village has a raythara Sahakari Bank. There are a small number of shops in Kodibettu and this village has a rice mill. There are many buses to this village which travel from Udupi to Peranankila. There is a newly built district sub-jail at Anjar village within Kodibettu gram panchayat.
