= Kalthodu =

- Village
- Interactive map of Kalthodu
- Coordinates: 13.8183°N 74.7187°E
- Country: India
- State: Karnataka
- District: Udupi
- Taluk: Byndoor

Government
  - Body: Village Panchayat

Population (2011)
  - Total: 5,172

Languages
  - Official: Kannada, Konkani
- Time zone: UTC+5:30 (IST)
- Vehicle registration: KA

Kalthodu is a village in the Byndoor taluk of Udupi district. T As of 2011, Kalthodu has a total population of 5172 people consisting of 2820 male and 539 female residents. The village occupies a total area of 4212.71 hecatres with a population density of 1.228 people per hectare. As of 2011, the total literacy rate was 66.57% which was higher than the national average of 59.5%.

As of 2011, Kalthodu has an employment rate of over 52.11%, 70.17% of whom are employed over 183 days in a year.

In 2022, a school girl was washed away by a swollen stream while crossing a wooden footbridge near Kalthodu which brought to light the lack of infrastructure in the village.

== See also ==
- Byndoor
- Udupi
- Kundapura
