= Bijoor =

- village
- Interactive map of Bijoor
- Coordinates: 13°50′38″N 74°38′23″E
- Country: India
- State: Karnataka
- District: Udupi
- Taluk: Byndoor

Government
  - Body: Gram panchayat
- Elevation: 15 m (49 ft)

Population (2001)
  - Total: 5,791

Languages
  - Official: Kannada, Konkani
- Time zone: UTC+5:30 (IST)
- ISO 3166 code: IN-KA
- Vehicle registration: KA
- Website: karnataka.gov.in

Bijoor is a Village near to Byndoor in the southern state of Karnataka, India. It is located in the Byndoor taluk of Udupi district in Karnataka.Bijur Gram Panchayat consists of a single village consisting of 4 broad wards. The village is bounded by the town of Byndoor to the north, Kergalu to the south, Kaltodu to the east and Uppunda village to the west. Bijoor village is located in 3 km from the taluk center and Hobali. The village has one high school, four higher primary schools and one private Shri Vivekananda English Medium School that provides high-quality education.

== Demographics ==
As of 2001 India census, Bijoor had a population of 5791 with 2513 males and 3278 females. Bijoor has a small halt railway station on the Konkan Railway Line.

== See also ==
- Byndoor
- Udupi
- Districts of Karnataka
