= Golihole =

- Village
- Nickname: Greater Golihole
- Country: India
- State: Karnataka
- District: Udupi
- Taluk: Byndoor

Government
  - Body: Village Panchayat

Population (2011)
  - Total: 3,479

Languages
  - Official: Kannada, Konkani
- Time zone: UTC+5:30 (IST)
- Vehicle registration: KA

Golihole is a village in the Byndoor taluk of Udupi district. Before 2018, the village was part of the Kundrapura taluk. As of 2011, Golihole has a total population of 3479 people consisting of 1918 male and 303 female residents. The village occupies a total area of 4584.40 hecatres with a population density of 0.759 people per hectare. As of 2011, the total literacy rate was 70.37% which was higher than the national average of 59.5%.

As of 2011, Golihole has an employment rate of over 47.63%, 77.01% of whom are employed over 183 days in a year.

== Infrastructure ==
The Gulnadi Halla stream runs through the village, however due to insufficient funds, the only means of cross the stream is via a wooden hanging bridge. This had led to incovenience in performing daily tasks, especially during the monsoon season for the residents of the village.

== People ==
Prathviraj Shetty a member of the India's para T20 cricket team for 2022 hails from Golihole.

== See also ==
- Udupi
- Kundapura
