= 34 Kudi =

- village
- Location in Karnataka, India 34 Kudi (India)
- Coordinates: 13.472850°N 74.863068°E
- Country: India
- State: Karnataka
- District: Udupi
- Talukas: Brahmavar

Government
  - Body: Village Panchayat

Languages
  - Official: Kannada
- Time zone: UTC+5:30 (IST)
- ISO 3166 code: IN-KA
- Vehicle registration: KA
- Nearest city: Brahmavar
- Civic agency: Village Panchayat
- Website: karnataka.gov.in

34 Kudi is a village in the southern state of Karnataka, India. It is located in the Brahmavar taluk of Udupi district in Karnataka.

== See also ==
- Udupi
- Districts of Karnataka
