= Jadkal =

- Village
- Location in Karnataka, India
- Coordinates: 13.8033°N 74.8005°E
- Country: India
- State: Karnataka
- District: Udupi
- Taluk: Byndoor

Government
  - Body: Village Panchayat
- Time zone: UTC+5:30 (IST)
- Postal code: 576232
- Vehicle registration: KA

Jadkal is a village in Byndoor Taluk, Udupi district, Karnataka, India.
