= Ampar, Karnataka =

Village in Karnataka, India

Ampar Amparu/Amparu Murkai
- village
- Interactive map of Ampar
- Coordinates: 13.6499°N 74.8234°E
- Country: India
- State: Karnataka
- District: Udupi
- Talukas: Kundapur

Government
  - Body: Gram panchayat

Population (2001)
  - Total: 4,943

Languages
  - Official: Kannada, Kundagannada
- Time zone: UTC+5:30 (IST)
- Postal code: 576211
- ISO 3166 code: IN-KA
- Vehicle registration: KA
- Nearest city: Udupi
- Civic agency: Gram panchayat
- Website: karnataka.gov.in

Ampar (also called Amparu/Amparu murkai) is a village located in the Kundapur taluk of Udupi district in the Indian state of Karnataka.

== Geography ==
Ampar is located approximately 15 kilometres from Kundapura town and is surrounded by rivers and forests. The village has a tropical monsoon climate, characterized by heavy rainfall during the monsoon season and moderate temperatures throughout the year.

== Demographics ==
Ampar has a population comprising primarily Kannada speaking people, with Tulu also widely spoken. The local economy is largely based on agriculture, with rice, coconut, and areca nut being the main crops.

== Culture and festivals ==
Ampar hosts cultural and religious events, with festivals such as Naga Panchami, Deepavali, and Ganesh Chaturthi being significant. The village has several temples, including the Sri Mahalingeshwara Temple, which is a place of worship for the local community.

Traditional art forms like Yakshagana and Bhuta Kola are part of the village's cultural heritage and are performed on special occasions.

== Education ==
The village has primary and secondary educational institutions. For higher education, students often travel to Kundapura or Udupi.

== Connectivity ==
Ampar is connected by road to Kundapura and nearby towns. Public and private bus services are commonly used. The nearest railway station is Kundapura Railway Station, and the closest airport is Mangalore International Airport, approximately 100 kilometres away.

== See also ==
- Udupi
- Kundapur
