= Heranjal =

Village in India

Coordinates: 13.802°N 74.659°E

Heranjal is a village in Byndoor Taluk of Udupi district in the Indian state of Karnataka. The nearby villages of Heranjal are Kambadakone, Kalthodu, Hoskote, Halageri and Noojadi. Heranjal is well known for Sri Gudemahalingeshwara Temple, Sri Durgaparameshwari Temple, and the Pragathi Poultry Farm.
