= Bommarabettu =

- village
- Interactive map of Bommarabettu
- Coordinates: 13.3324°N 74.8902°E
- Country: India
- State: Karnataka
- District: Udupi
- Talukas: Udupi

Government
  - Body: Gram panchayat
- Elevation: 40 m (130 ft)

Population (2001)
  - Total: 7,853

Languages
  - Official: Kannada
- Time zone: UTC+5:30 (IST)
- ISO 3166 code: IN-KA
- Vehicle registration: KA
- Website: karnataka.gov.in

Bommarabettu is a village in the southern state of Karnataka, India. It is located in the Udupi taluk of Udupi district in Karnataka.

== Demographics ==
As of 2001 India census, Bommarabettu had a population of 7853 with 3781 males and 4072 females.

== See also ==
- Hiriyadka
- Udupi
- Districts of Karnataka
