= Neelavar =

- village
- Location in Karnataka, India Neelavar (India)
- Coordinates: 13.454°N 74.784°E
- Country: India
- State: Karnataka
- Region: Karavali
- District: Udupi

Languages
  - Official: Kannada
- Time zone: UTC+5:30 (IST)
- PIN: 576213
- Telephone code: 0820
- Vehicle registration: KA-20

Neelavar (variously Neelavara or Nilavara) is a village in Brahmavar taluk of Udupi district in Karnataka, India. Neelavar is situated about 7 km from Brahmavar that lies on NH-17 and around 3 km from Kunjal (Kannada: ಕುಂಜಾಲು) that lies on the road from Brahmavar to Hebri. Neelavar lies roughly between the river Sita in the north and the village Kunjal to the south.
