= 108 Kalthur =

108 Kalathur
- village
- Location in Karnataka, India 108 Kalathur (India)
- Coordinates: 13.2212600°N 74.791702°E
- Country: India
- State: Karnataka
- District: Udupi
- Talukas: Udupi

Government
  - Body: Village Panchayat

Languages
  - Official: Kannada
- Time zone: UTC+5:30 (IST)
- ISO 3166 code: IN-KA
- Vehicle registration: KA
- Nearest city: Udupi
- Civic agency: Village Panchayat
- Website: karnataka.gov.in

108 Kalthur is a village in the southern state of Karnataka, India. It is located in the Udupi taluk of Udupi district in Karnataka.

The village is near Hebri (about 5 km) and lies on the Hebri Brahmavar State Highway. A government-run primary school up to 4th standard exists. There are so many shops & milk dairy & restaurant also there.

Santhekatte is the nearby centre where the government school up to 7th standard exists. Santekatte also has a cashew factory, a rice mill, a few shops, a post office, a farmer's co-operative society, and a primary health centre.

== See also ==
- Udupi
- Districts of Karnataka
