= Hadavu =

- Village
- Country: India
- State: Karnataka
- District: Udupi
- Taluk: Byndoor

Government
  - Body: Village Panchayat

Population (2011)
  - Total: 1,158

Languages
  - Official: Kannada, Konkani
- Time zone: UTC+5:30 (IST)
- Vehicle registration: KA
- Website: padukonevillage.in

Hadavu is a village in the Byndoor taluk of Udupi district.

== Demographics ==
In 2011, Hadavu had a total population of 1158 people consisting of 710 male and 81 female residents. The village occupies a total area of 225.29 hecatres with a population density of 5.14 people per hectare. As of 2011, the total literacy rate was 75.56% which was higher than the national average of 59.5%.

In 2011, Hadavu had an employment rate of over 35.84%, 73.01% of whom are employed over 183 days in a year. The primary source of livelihood for the village is agricultutre, primarily paddy cultivation.

== Infrastructure ==
The village is close to National Highway 66 and is located along the Trasi-Maravanthe beachfront. It is connected to the mainland via a narrow bridge across the Souparnika near Maharajaswamy Varahaswamy Temple.

As a result of the 2019 Karnataka floods, however, internal roads in the village have deteriorated and the village has been cut off from the mainland due to the collapse of the bridge leading to the village relying on boats to ferry them to the mainland.

== See also ==
- Udupi
- Kundapura
