= Beejadi =

- village
- Interactive map of Beejadi
- Coordinates: 13.582°N 74.6902°E
- Country: India
- State: Karnataka
- District: Udupi
- Talukas: Kundapura

Government
  - Body: Beejadi Gram panchayat
- Elevation: 13 m (43 ft)

Population (2011)
  - Total: 6,275

Languages
  - Official: Kannada
- Time zone: UTC+5:30 (IST)
- Postal code: 576222
- ISO 3166 code: IN-KA
- Vehicle registration: KA
- Website: karnataka.gov.in

Beejadi is a village in the southern state of Karnataka, India. It is located in the Kundapura taluk of Udupi district in Karnataka.

== Places to visit ==
- Vishnumurthy Devasthana
- Shree Chikku Amma Temple, Beejadi
- Bejadi Beach

== Demographics ==
As of 2011 India census, total 1267 families residing. The Beejadi village has population of 6275 of which 2976 are males while 3299 are females as per Population Census 2011.
In Beejadi village population of children with age 0-6 is 553 which makes up 8.81% of total population of village. Average Sex Ratio of Beejadi village is 1109 which is higher than Karnataka state average of 973. Child Sex Ratio for the Beejadi as per census is 920, lower than Karnataka average of 948.
Beejadi village has higher literacy rate compared to Karnataka. In 2011, literacy rate of Beejadi village was 83.66% compared to 75.36% of Karnataka. In Beejadi Male literacy stands at 92.04% while female literacy rate was 76.24%.

== Transportation ==
NH66 is major road passes through.
Buses: Private buses ply often for local Transportation. Government buses are available for long journeys at fixed timings.
Railways: Kundapura Railway Station is nearest Railway station.

== See also ==
- Udupi
- Districts of Karnataka
- Koteshwara
- Kundapura
- Anegudde
