= Nandanavana =

- Village
- Interactive map of Nandanavana
- Country: India
- State: Karnataka
- District: Udupi
- Taluk: Kundapura

Government
  - Body: Village Panchayat

Population (2011)
  - Total: 1,032

Languages
  - Official: Kannada, Konkani
- Time zone: UTC+5:30 (IST)
- Vehicle registration: KA

Nandanavana is a village in the Byndoor taluk of Udupi district. The village was previously part of the Kundapura taluk but was transferred to Bydoor taluk in 2018. As of 2011, Nandanavana has a total population of 1032 people consisting of 552 male and 57 female residents. The village occupies a total area of 96.83 hecatres with a population density of 10.658 people per hectare. As of 2011, the total literacy rate was 83.53% which was higher than the national average of 59.5%.

As of 2011, Nandanavana has an employment rate of over 39.34%, 56.65% of whom are employed over 183 days in a year.

The village has a Government Lower Primary school.

== See also ==
- Udupi
- Kundapura
