= Kodladi =

Kodladi is a village in the southern state of Karnataka, India.^. Ajri, Udupi, Karnataka It is located in the Kundapura taluk of Udupi district in Karnataka.

This small village has a lower Primary School, High school. The place is well connected to Kundapura, Udupi (district centre), Shimoga (neighboring district) and Kollur (important pilgrimage centre).

== Business ==
As this is not a business centre, main business of villagers revolve around agriculture. Coconut, paddy, arecanut, pepper, cashew and, recently, rubber are main crops.

This village does not have an independent panchayath office, primary health centre, medical store. For higher studies or for English medium schools students have to travel nearly 15–20 km a day.

This village does not have proper transport facility also.
