= Badakere =

Village in Karnataka, India

- Village
- Location in Karnataka, India
- Coordinates: 13°44′27″N 74°38′55″E
- Country: India
- State: Karnataka
- District: Udupi
- Taluk: Kundapura

Government
  - Body: Village Panchayat

Population (2011)
  - Total: 1,711

Languages
  - Official: Kannada, Konkani
- Time zone: UTC+5:30 (IST)
- Vehicle registration: KA

Badakere is a village in the Kundapur taluk of Udupi district, Karnataka, India. As of 2011, Badakere has a total population of 1,711 people consisting of 974 male and 156 female residents. The village occupies a total area of 370.96 hecatres with a population density of 4.612 people per hectare. As of 2011, the total literacy rate was 69.84% which was higher than the national average of 59.5%.

As of 2011, Badakere has an employment rate of over 31.09%, 87.97% of whom are employed over 183 days in a year.

In 2019, the Badalkere village was affected by the 2019 Karnataka floods leading to a significant damage to life and property

== See also ==
- Udupi
- Kundapura
