= Japthi =

- Village
- Country: India
- State: Karnataka
- District: Udupi
- Taluk: Kundapura

Government
  - Body: Village Panchayat

Population (2011)
  - Total: 2,178

Languages
  - Official: Kannada, Konkani
- Time zone: UTC+5:30 (IST)
- Vehicle registration: KA

Japthi is a village in the Kundapur taluk of Udupi district.

== Demographics ==
As of 2011, Japthi has a total population of 2,178 people consisting of 1160 male and 188 female residents. The village occupies a total area of 902.61 hectares with a population density of 2.413 people per hectare. As of 2011, the total literacy rate was 69.65% which was higher than the national average of 59.5%.

As of 2011, Japthi has an employment rate of over 41.09%, 96.54% of whom are employed over 183 days in a year.

== Agriculture ==
Agriculture is the primary source of revenue in the region, with cashew plantations being one of primary sources of revenue.

== See also ==
- Udupi
- Kundapura
