= Heskathoor =

- Village
- Country: India
- State: Karnataka
- District: Udupi
- Taluk: Kundapura

Government
  - Body: Village Panchayat

Population (2011)
  - Total: 980

Languages
  - Official: Kannada, Konkani
- Time zone: UTC+5:30 (IST)
- Vehicle registration: KA

Heskathoor is a village in the Kundapur taluk of Udupi district.

== Demographics ==
In 2011, Heskathoor had a total population of 980 people consisting of 505 male and 89 female residents. The village occupies a total area of 288.42 hecatres with a population density of 3.398 people per hectare. In 2011, the total literacy rate was 73.67% which was higher than the national average of 59.5%.

In 2011, Heskathoor had an employment rate of over 38.67%, 90.77% of whom are employed over 183 days in a year.

== Education ==
The Heskathoor High School, a government funded institute provides education to the village's residents.

== See also ==
- Udupi
- Kundapura
