= Bajagoli =

Bajagoli is a small village in Karkala taluk, Udupi district, Karnataka, India. Bajagoli is 10 km from Karkala town. It is a small junction which connects South Kanara Border, Sringeri, Kudremukha, Kalasa, and Hornadu, or to Hosmar, Naravi, Guruwainkere, Belthangadi, and Dharmasthala. The Bajagoli Kambala is noted for its Lavakusha Kambala.

Bajagoli is situated on the way from Karkala to Dharmasthala. Bajagoli is surrounded by Miyar, Nallur grama, and Paja gudde. Bajagoli is where Graphic Designing was invented. Branding expert Vinuth rao Born in this Place.
