= Tallur =

Tallur Talluru, Thallur, Thalluru
- Village
- Nickname: Kuntigrama
- Interactive map of Tallur
- Country: India
- State: Karnataka
- District: Udupi
- Taluka: Kundapur taluk

Government
  - Body: Tallur Gram Panchayat

Population (2011)
  - Total: 3,801

Languages
  - Official: Kundagannaga, Kannada, Konkani
- Time zone: UTC+5:30 (IST)
- PIN: 576230
- Vehicle registration: KA-20

Tallur is a village in the Kundapur taluk of Udupi district in Karnataka State of India. It is less than five kilometres from the town of Kundapura.

== Demographics ==
The village has a population of 3,801 of which 1,755 are males while 2,046 are females as per the Population Census of 2011.

However, many unofficial estimates speculate that the population of the village has surpassed 5,000 as of 2023.

== Religious centres ==
Two of the prominent temples, among many ancient temples in the village, are the Shri Mahalingeshwara Temple and the Shri Kuntiamma Temple.

There is also a Catholic church named the St Francis Assisi Church.

== Geophysical features ==
Much of the village land is low-lying farm plains which were forests transformed for cultivation.

A minor stream of the Chakra river flows along the northern part of the village before joining the Panchagangavalli river. The stream is mostly covered by mangroves. There are a few scenic ditches in the village passing through its fields and into the stream. In 2020, a dyke was constructed on the stream in the Rajadi area of the village.

The Halady river flows to the south of the village, marking its boundary.

On the village's west is the Uppinakudru island which is connected to the village by a causeway. On its eastern side, it is bordered by Hattiangady.

On cloudless, sunny days the Kodachadri hill's peak is visible from the village.

The village's elevation is thirteen metres above sea level.

== Learning centres ==
The government primary school in the village is more than one hundred and thirty-six years old, first constructed during the British Raj. There is a government high school in the village proper and two other government primary schools in the Uppinakudru and Sablady areas within the village's panchayat limits.

There are also more than five anganwadis within the village's panchayat boundaries.

There is also a small government library located near the panchayat office and the primary school.

There is also a family-owned and managed special school for the intellectually and mentally disabled. A Catholic church-owned and operated school is also functioning in the village.

== Transport ==
The National Highway 66 passes through the village and it is also the junction of the road towards Neralakatte junction, Kollur and Ampar junction.

Kundapura railway station and Senapura railway station are the nearest railway stations.

Except for a few privately owned boats, the village is not connected through marine and riverine modes of transportation even though it is surrounded by many water bodies and is less than five kilometres away from the Kundapura-Gangolli estuary to the Arabian Sea.

== Local government ==
The village and its surrounding nine inhabited areas are governed by the Tallur Gram Panchayat which presently has eighteen elected members. In 2021, the panchayat made news by electing a migrant, daily-wage labourer as its president.

A batch of local ASHA workers service basic healthcare to the villagers. A Health & Wellness Centre was set up near the library and panchayat office in 2021, operated by a female Community Health Officer.

The Village Administrative Officer's office too is in the same cluster of offices near the library and panchayat office.

A franchise of the Common Services Centre and Grama One is also present in the village.

== Economy ==
Farming is the mainstay of the village's economy. A cooperative milk collection centre collects milk from the villagers and distributes government-provided and subsidised cattle feeds. There are a few cashews, coconut oil, spices and rice mills as well.

There is a branch of the Bank of Baroda, SCDCC Bank and other co-operative banks and credit societies.

A mud tiles factory also operates on the banks of the Halady river. There are vehicle retail showrooms along with many small and medium-sized vehicle repair and service centres and metal fabrication workshops.

There are a few convention halls along with roadside eateries, bakeries, hotels, restaurants and bars.

== Notable people ==
Internationally renowned artist L.N. Tallur was born here
