= Molahalli =

- Village
- Country: India
- State: Karnataka
- District: Udupi
- Taluk: Kundapura

Government
  - Body: Village Panchayat

Population (2011)
  - Total: 4,079

Languages
  - Official: Kannada, Konkani
- Time zone: UTC+5:30 (IST)
- Vehicle registration: KA

Molahalli is a village in the Kundapur taluk of Udupi district.

== Demographics ==
In 2011, Molahalli had a total population of 4079 people consisting of 2202 male and 353 female residents. The village occupies a total area of 2044.34 hectares with a population density of 1.995 people per hectare. As of 2011, the total literacy rate was 67.76% which was higher than the national average of 59.5%.

In 2011, Molahalli had an employment rate of over 46.41%, 83.89% of whom are employed over 183 days in a year.

== Agriculture ==
Molahalli is primarily dependent on agriculture as the primary source of employment and revenue. The village is expected to see a 15 hectare increase in irrigated farmland as a result of the construction of the Varahi Left Bank Irrigation canal. However, shoddy and unfinished work on the canal has caused multiple breaches, which have adversely affected the regions farmland by submerging them during rainy seasons in 2015 and 2017.

== See also ==
- Udupi
- Kundapura
