= Asodu =

- Village
- Interactive map of Asodu
- Coordinates: 13.5880°N 74.7355°E
- Country: India
- State: Karnataka
- District: Udupi
- Taluk: Kundapura

Government
  - Body: Village Panchayat

Population (2011)
  - Total: 1,114

Languages
  - Official: Kannada, Konkani
- Time zone: UTC+5:30 (IST)
- Vehicle registration: KA

Asodu is a village in the Kundapur taluk of Udupi district.

== Demographics ==
As of 2011, Asodu has a total population of 1,114 people consisting of 594 male and 93 female residents. The village occupies a total area of 441.39 hecatres with a population density of 2.524 people per hectare. As of 2011, the total literacy rate was 70.2% which was higher than the national average of 59.5%.

As of 2011, Asodu has an employment rate of over 45.69%, 90.96% of whom are employed over 183 days in a year.

== Agriculture ==
The primary industry of the region is agriculture, with paddy cultivation being one of the primary sources of revenue.

== See also ==
- Udupi
- Kundapura
