= Kote, Karnataka =

Kote Kota
- Village
- Location in Karnataka, India
- Coordinates: 13°30′54″N 74°42′20″E
- Country: India
- State: Karnataka
- District: Udupi district

Languages
  - Official: Kannada, Kundagannada, Tulu
- Time zone: UTC+5:30 (IST)
- PIN: 576221
- Telephone code: 0820
- Vehicle registration: KA-20
- Nearest city: Udupi
- Lok Sabha constituency: Udupi-Chikmagalur

Kote or Kota is a town on NH 66 in Brahmavar taluk, in the Indian state of Karnataka. On the way from Brahmavar to Kundapura.
