= 38 Kalthur =

- village
- Location in Karnataka, India 38 Kalthur (India)
- Coordinates: 13.455330°N 74.9282990°E
- Country: India
- State: Karnataka
- District: Udupi
- Talukas: Udupi

Government
  - Body: Village Panchayat

Languages
  - Official: Kannada
- Time zone: UTC+5:30 (IST)
- ISO 3166 code: IN-KA
- Vehicle registration: KA
- Nearest city: Udupi
- Civic agency: Village Panchayat
- Website: karnataka.gov.in

38 Kalthur is a village in the southern state of Karnataka, India. It is located in the Udupi taluk of Udupi district in Karnataka.

== See also ==
- Udupi
- Districts of Karnataka
