= Devalkunda =

- Village
- Country: India
- State: Karnataka
- District: Udupi
- Taluk: Kundapura

Government
  - Body: Village Panchayat

Population (2011)
  - Total: 1,766

Languages
  - Official: Kannada, Konkani
- Time zone: UTC+5:30 (IST)
- Vehicle registration: KA

Devalkunda is a village in the Kundapur taluk of Udupi district. As of 2011, Devalkunda has a total population of 1766 people consisting of 994 male and 129 female residents. The village occupies a total area of 542.35 hectares with a population density of 3.256 people per hectare. As of 2011, the total literacy rate was 77.18% which was higher than the national average of 59.5%.

As of 2011, Devalkunda has an employment rate of over 34.26%, 48.76% of whom are employed over 183 days in a year.

== Ammonia leak ==
In 2019, the Malpe Fresh Marine plant, a fish storage facility located in Devalkunda suffered a leak in ammonia gas that led to over 74 labourers falling seriously ill

== See also ==
- Udupi
- Kundapura
