= Kundabarandadi =

- Village
- Country: India
- State: Karnataka
- District: Udupi
- Taluk: Kundapura

Government
  - Body: Village Panchayat

Population (2011)
  - Total: 1,570

Languages
  - Official: Kannada, Konkani
- Time zone: UTC+5:30 (IST)
- Vehicle registration: KA

Kundabarandadi is a village in the Kundapur taluk of Udupi district.

== Demographics ==
As of 2011, Kundabarandadi has a total population of 1570 people consisting of 903 male and 141 female residents. The village occupies a total area of 486.70 hecatres with a population density of 3.226 people per hectare. As of 2011, the total literacy rate was 70.89% which was higher than the national average of 59.5%.

As of 2011, Kundabarandadi has an employment rate of over 51.85%, 82.92% of whom are employed over 183 days in a year.

== History ==
In 2019, an ancient inscription containing 34 lines of Sanskrit was found in the village.

In 1972, an vented dam and anicut was constructed across the Noojadihole stream in the village to aid in irrigation of the area's farm lands.

== See also ==
- Udupi
- Kundapura
