= Kenchanoor =

- Village
- Country: India
- State: Karnataka
- District: Udupi
- Taluk: Kundapura

Government
  - Body: Village Panchayat

Population (2011)
  - Total: 1,324

Languages
  - Official: Kannada, Konkani
- Time zone: UTC+5:30 (IST)
- Vehicle registration: KA

Kenchanoor is a village in the Kundapur taluk of Udupi district.

== Demographics ==
In 2011, Kenchanoor had a total population of 1324 people consisting of 734 male and 141 female residents. The village occupies a total area of 496.38 hecatres with a population density of 2.667 people per hectare. In 2011, the total literacy rate was 66.69% which was higher than the national average of 59.5%.

In 2011, Kenchanoor had an employment rate of over 33.53%, 81.76% of whom are employed over 183 days in a year.

== Industry ==
The primary industry of the region is agriculture, a significant part of which includes cashew plantations.

== See also ==
- Udupi
- Kundapura
