= Uliargoli =

- village
- Country: India
- State: Karnataka
- District: Udupi
- Talukas: Udupi

Government
  - Body: Gram panchayat

Population (2001)
  - Total: 5,163

Languages
  - Official: Kannada
- Time zone: UTC+5:30 (IST)
- ISO 3166 code: IN-KA
- Vehicle registration: KA
- Website: karnataka.gov.in

Uliargoli is a village in the southern state of Karnataka, India. It is located in the Udupi taluk of Udupi district in Karnataka.

== Demographics ==
As of 2001 India census, Uliargoli had a population of 5163 with 2377 males and 2786 females.

== See also ==
- Udupi
- Districts of Karnataka
