= Varahi lift irrigation project =

Irrigation project in Karnataka, India

Varahi lift irrigation project is an irrigation project across Varahi River near Siddapura village, Udupi district, Karnataka, India.

== Initiation ==
The Varahi project was approved by Government of Karnataka in 1979 with an initial project cost of Rs.9.43 crores. Originally planned as a power generation project, but as the original plan involved submerging of 1,019 acres of forest land, it was changed to lift irrigation project in 2001 as the latter involved submerging of only 129.60 forest land. The irrigation project, on completion, is designed to irrigated 38,800 acres of land of which 15,702 acres are in Kundapura and Udupi taluks of Karnataka.

=== Delay and cost escalation ===
Over the years, the project cost increased substantially and in first 25 years a sum of Rs.37 crores were spent, but the work was still under progress as in April 2005. After three decades of launching the scheme, the project cost of the scheme escalated to more than Rs.650 crores of which about Rs.375 crores was spent up to 2011 and work was still under progress. The official reasons given in 2011 by Minister of Water resources, for undue delay in completion of the project were, "hurdles from Revenue Department, changes in design, land acquisition, no objection from Forest Department and untimely rain".

== Hope for sugarcane growers ==
In 2004, the lift irrigation project was brought under the preview of Karnataka Neeravari Nigam and once completed, it is expected to revive the defunct Brahmavar Cooperative Sugar Factory located in the same district. In 2011, a sum of Rs.10 crores was provided to revive the Sugar factory.

== Controversies ==
The undue delay in completion of project has given scope to doubts about the misappropriation of government funds and certain public have filed writ petition in High court of Karnataka demanding for a CBI investigation. In 2011, Karnataka Pradesh Congress Committee president demanded Special Investigation Team probe as more than Rs.200 crores was sanctioned to the project within a span of previous three years by previous Government. Karnataka Chief Minister Siddaramaiah inaugurated the project on 04/05/2015, but only for two days the water has flown in the channels. The people also suspect that this is one of the biggest scam in the name of water irrigation and probe should be done to punish the people involved in this scam. Although MLC Pratap Chandra Shetty is trying get attention about the varahi scams in Legislative Council, local MLA Haladi Srinivasa Shetty is showing no interest in this.
