= Thopanangadi =

Thopanangadi is a small village in Shirva, Karnataka, India which is 17 km far away from Udupi. 100-175 people live in Thopanangadi.
