= Kodange =

- village
- Country: India
- State: Karnataka

Languages
  - Official: Kannada
- Time zone: UTC+5:30 (IST)

Kodange is a small hamlet in Karkal taluka, Udupi district, Karnataka, India. It is near Manipal and about 8 km away from Udupi and 3 km from Parkala junction in Karnataka. Agriculture is the main occupation.
