= Hejamadi =

Village in India

- village
- Country: India
- State: Karnataka
- District: Udupi
- Talukas: Udupi

Population (2011)
  - Total: 8,075

Languages
  - Official: Kannada
- Time zone: UTC+5:30 (IST)

Hejamadi or Hejamady is a village in the southern state of Karnataka, India.It is located on north banks of river Shambhavi, while Mulky is located on southern banks. There is an old road diverting from NH-66 ( Old NH-17 ) leading to village. It is located in the Udupi taluk of Udupi district and 28 km north of Mangalore in Karnataka. Areas in Hejamady: Guddeyangadi, Shiv Nagar, Kannangar, Hejamady, Mattu Patna, Aache Mattu, Doddagundi, Sannagundi, Palimar, Kodi, Gundi, North Sultan Road, South Sultan Road, Maruthi Road and AmavaseKariya.

== Demographics ==
As of 2011 India census, KANNANGAR-Hejamadi had a population of 8075 with 3806 males and 4269 females. Population of the village has decreased by -1.4% in last 10 years. In 2001 census total population here were 8192

=== Sex Ratio ===
As of 2011 census there are 1122 females per 1000 male in the village. Sex ratio in general caste is 1127, in schedule caste is 967 and in schedule tribe is 2250. There are 884 girls under 6 years of age per 1000 boys of the same age in the village. Overall sex ratio in the village has decreased by 20 females per 1000 male during the years from 2001 to 2011. Child sex ratio here has decreased by 165 girls per 1000 boys during the same time.

=== Literacy ===
Total 6599 people in the village are literate, among them 3218 are male and 3381 are female. Literacy rate (children under 6 are excluded) of Hejamadi is 91%. 96% of male and 87% of female population are literate here. Overall literacy rate in the village has increased by 4%. Male literacy has gone up by 3% and female literacy rate has gone up by 5%.

=== Workers profile ===
Hejamadi has 42% (3390) population engaged in either main or marginal works. 58% male and 28% female population are working population. 57% of total male population are main (full time) workers and 1% are marginal (part time) workers. For women 26% of total female population are main and 2% are marginal workers.

== See also ==
- Udupi
- Districts of Karnataka
