= Belve =

- Village
- Interactive map of Belve
- Coordinates: 13°31′42″N 74°55′22″E
- Country: India
- State: Karnataka
- District: Udupi
- Taluk: Kundapura

Government
  - Body: Village Panchayat
- Elevation: 13 m (43 ft)

Population (2011)
  - Total: 3,455

Languages
  - Official: Kannada, Konkani
- Time zone: UTC+5:30 (IST)
- Vehicle registration: KA

Belve is a village in the Kundapur taluk of Udupi, Karnataka, India.

== Demographics ==
In 2011, Belve had a population of 3,455 people, consisting of 1,778 females and 1677 males. The village occupies a total area of 2260.78 hecatres with a population density of 1.528 people per hectare. In 2011, the literacy rate was 70.62%, which was higher than the national average of 59.5%.

In 2011, Belve had an employment rate of over 43.5%, 91.15% of whom were employed over 183 days in a year.

== See also ==
- Udupi
- Kundapura
