= Ulloor (Karnataka) =

- Village
- Country: India
- State: Karnataka
- District: Udupi
- Taluk: Kundapura

Government
  - Body: Village Panchayat

Population (2011)
  - Total: 2,274

Languages
  - Official: Kannada, Konkani
- Time zone: UTC+5:30 (IST)
- Vehicle registration: KA

Ulloor is a village in the Kundapur taluk of Udupi district, Karnataka, India.

== Demographics ==
In 2011, Ulloor had a population of 2,274 people, consisting of 1,282 males and 216 females. The village occupies a total area of 764.21 hecatres with a population density of 2.976 people per hectare. In 2011, the total literacy rate was 69.31%, which was higher than the national average of 59.5%.

In 2011, Ulloor had an employment rate of over 43.14%, 63.0% of whom were employed over 183 days in a year.

== Agriculture ==
The primary industry in Ulloor is agriculture, with jack fruit farming being one of major sources of revenue.

== See also ==
- Udupi
- Kundapura
