= Pernankila =

Pernankila Peranankila
- village
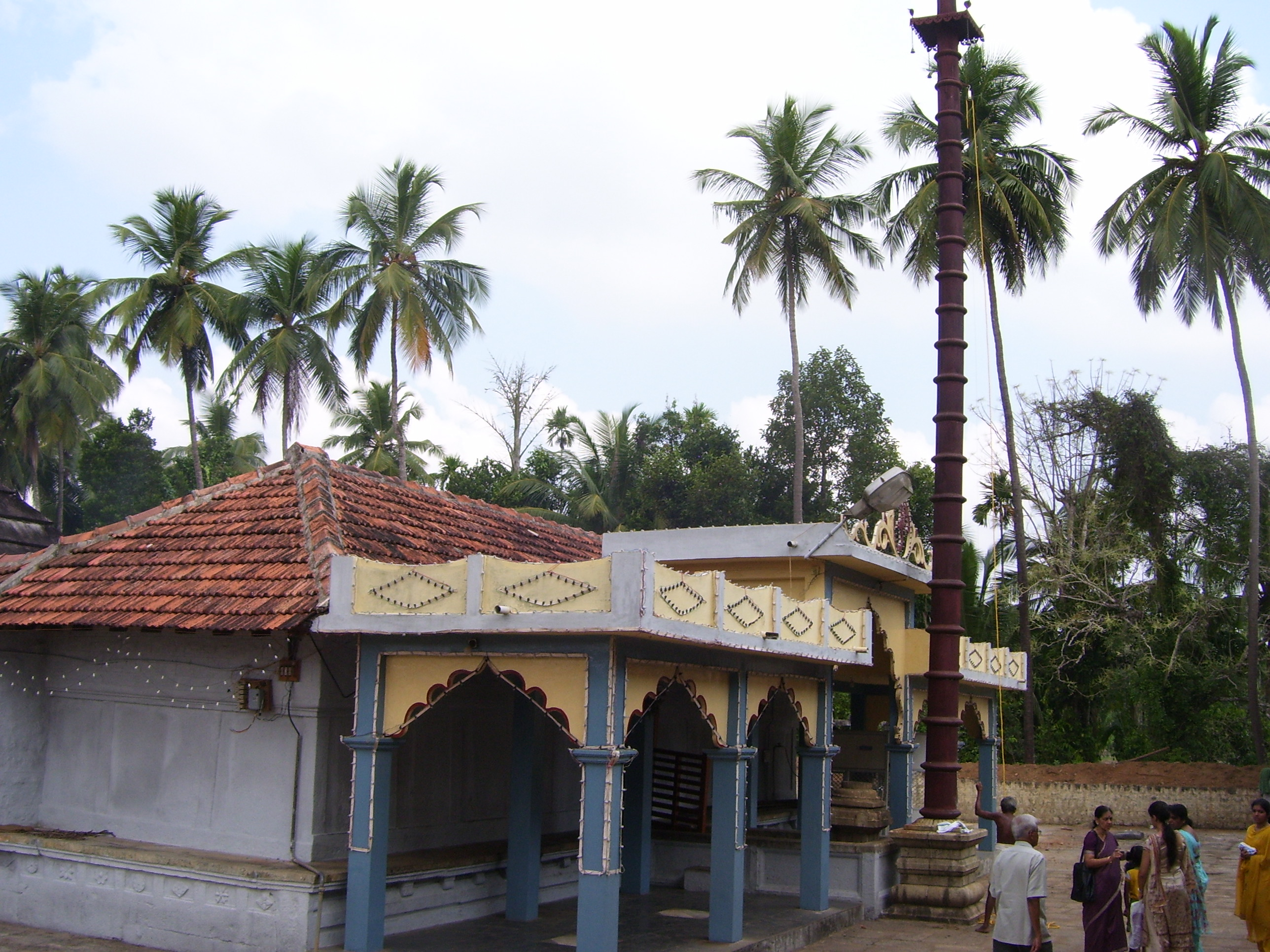
- Pernankila Temple

- Location in Karnataka, India Pernankila (India)
- Coordinates: 13°17′51″N 74°50′35″E
- Country: India
- State: Karnataka
- District: Udupi

Languages
  - Official/Regional: Kannada, Konkani, Tulu
  - Regional: Konkani, Tulu
- Time zone: UTC+5:30 (IST)
- PIN: 576113
- Nearest city/town: Manipal, Hiriyadka
- Website: pernankila.com

Pernankila (also Peranankila) is a village near Hiryadka of Udupi taluk in Udupi district. It is a mid-sized village located in Udupi district in the state of Karnataka in India. It had a population of about 2147 persons living in around 427 households according to 2001 census.

== Climate ==
The climate in Pernankila is hot in summers and mild in winter. During summers(from March to May) the temperature reaches up to 35 °C and in winters (from December to February) it is usually between 32 °C and 20 °C. The Monsoon period is from June to September with one of the rainfall averaging more than 4000mm every year and heavy winds.

Climate data for Peranankila
Month	Jan	Feb	Mar	Apr	May	Jun	Jul	Aug	Sep	Oct	Nov	Dec	Year
Mean daily maximum °C (°F)	32.8 (91.0)	33 (91)	33.5 (92.3)	34 (93)	33.3 (91.9)	29.7 (85.5)	28.2 (82.8)	28.4 (83.1)	29.5 (85.1)	30.9 (87.6)	32.3 (90.1)	32.8 (91.0)	31.5 (88.7)
Mean daily minimum °C (°F)	20.8 (69.4)	21.8 (71.2)	23.6 (74.5)	25 (77)	25.1 (77.2)	23.4 (74.1)	22.9 (73.2)	23 (73)	23.1 (73.6)	23.1 (73.6)	22.4 (72.3)	21.2 (70.2)	23.0 (73.3)
Average precipitation mm (inches)	1.1 (0.04)	0.2 (0.01)	2.9 (0.11)	24.4 (0.96)	183.2 (7.21)	1,177.2 (46.35)	1,350.4 (53.17)	787.3 (31.00)	292.1 (11.50)	190.8 (7.51)	70.9 (2.79)	16.4 (0.65)	4,096.9 (161.30)
