= Kemundel =

- village
- Location in Karnataka, India
- Coordinates: 13.1731655°N 74.7959941°E
- Country: India
- State: Karnataka
- District: Udupi district

Languages
  - Official: Kannada
- Time zone: UTC+5:30 (IST)
- PIN: 574 119

Kemundel (Kemundelu) is a place in the Udupi district of the state of Karnataka, India. It is near to Yellur and Admar. This place is the location of the proposed Nagarjuna Thermal Power Plant, which has been protested by the local populace.
