= Eedu =

Eedu Eedu
- village
- Location in Karnataka, India Eedu (India)
- Coordinates: 13.1559300°N 75.157680°E
- Country: India
- State: Karnataka
- District: Udupi

Government
  - Body: Village Panchayat

Population
  - Total: 3,000

Languages
  - Official: Kannada
- Time zone: UTC+5:30 (IST)
- ISO 3166 code: IN-KA
- Vehicle registration: KA
- Website: karnataka.gov.in

Eedu is a village in Karkala, Udupi district in the state of Karnataka, India.
