= 92 Heroor =

92 Heroor Bantakal
- village
- Location in Karnataka, India 92 Heroor (India)
- Coordinates: 13.243720°N 74.7906420°E
- Country: India
- State: Karnataka
- District: Udupi
- Talukas: Udupi

Government
  - Body: Village Panchayat

Languages
  - Official: Kannada, Tulu & Konkani
- Time zone: UTC+5:30 (IST)
- Nearest city: Udupi
- Civic agency: Village Panchayat

92 Heroor is a village in the southern state of Karnataka, India. It is located in the Udupi taluk of Udupi district in Karnataka.

Shri Mahalingeshwara Temple is one of the famous temples located in the village. It is a 300 year old temple. Sri Gururaghavendra Bhajana Mandli of 92, Heroor has completed 25 years. The founder President of Sri Gururaghavendra Bhjana Mandali is Shri Late Jayarama Devadig and Founder Secretary is Shri Shrinivas Prabhu (Spoorthi). Shrinivas is one of the well-known social workers who implemented many village development projects like, road, water supply, aforestration and many more together with the members of Shri Gururaghavendra Bhajana Mandali. He was elected continuously for five years as secretary of this organisation.

Thaali Kere and Gampada Kere are the good lakes of the village. Mllamar is a river.

"Abbettu Gutthu" and "Yeddeda Gutthu" are two well-known landmark houses. Originally Abbettu Gutthu belonged to Shetty family and Yeddeda Gutthu to Rajapur Sarawath Brahmin's family. Mr Subraya Prabhu was the owner of Yeddeda Gutthu. Currently this place is called as "Addedagutthu" and is owned by Sthanik Brahmin family named Shri Sadanand Shanbhag. The Shanbhag family have donated their land for local school, famous Babbuswami & Naga temples. Addedagutthu is highly revered as the "Nagabana" here is more than 300 years old. It is covered by equally old trees & surrounded by natural lake, which provides natural shade cover & water for the GOD Nagaraj. The third house is called " Sthanada Mane"

Babbuswami and Jumadi Kola are cultural programmes held every year at Addedagutthu. Additionally, Mahashivratri is celebrated.

There are two Heroors in Udupi Taluk and one is 52, Heroor and other 92, Heroor, Both Heroor are called also Peroor.

== See also ==
- Udupi
- Districts of Karnataka
