= Gujjadi =

- village
- Country: India
- State: Karnataka
- District: Udupi
- Talukas: Kundapura

Government
  - Body: Gram panchayat

Population (2001)
  - Total: 5,867

Languages
  - Official: Kannada
- Time zone: UTC+5:30 (IST)
- ISO 3166 code: IN-KA
- Vehicle registration: KA
- Website: karnataka.gov.in

Gujjadi also known as Nayakwadi is a village in the southern state of Karnataka, India. It is located in the Kundapura taluk of Udupi district in Karnataka.

== Demographics ==
As of 2001 India census, Gujjadi had a population of 5867 with 2776 males and 3091 females.

== See also ==
- Udupi
- Districts of Karnataka

https://kundapraa.com/kodapadi-guheshwara-temple-gujjadi/
