= Kukkundoor =

- village
- Country: India
- State: Karnataka
- District: Udupi
- Talukas: Karkal

Government
  - Body: Gram panchayat

Population (2001)
  - Total: 11,770

Languages
  - Official: Kannada
- Time zone: UTC+5:30 (IST)
- PIN: 576117
- Telephone code: karkala town
- ISO 3166 code: IN-KA
- Vehicle registration: KA
- Nearest city: karkala town
- Lok Sabha constituency: udupi
- Vidhan Sabha constituency: karkala
- Website: karnataka.gov.in

Kukkundoor is a village in the southern state of Karnataka, India. It is located in the Karkal taluk of Udupi district in Karnataka.

== Demographics ==
As of 2001 India census, Kukkundoor had a population of 11770 with 5677 males and 6093 females.

== See also ==
- Udupi
- Districts of Karnataka
