= Thekkatte =

- Village
- Country: India
- State: Karnataka
- District: Udupi
- Taluk: Kundapura

Government
  - Body: Village Panchayat

Population (2011)
  - Total: 5,590

Languages
  - Official: Kannada, Konkani
- Time zone: UTC+5:30 (IST)
- Vehicle registration: KA

Thekkatte is a village in the Kundapur taluk of Udupi, Karnataka, India.

== Demographics ==
In 2011, Thekkatte has a total population of 5,590 people consisting of 2,885 male and 520 female residents. The village occupies a total area of 543.73 hecatres with a population density of 10.281 people per hectare. As of 2011, the total literacy rate was 76.08% which was higher than the national average of 59.5%.

In 2011, Thekkatte has an employment rate of over 48.6%, 78.76% of whom are employed over 183 days in a year.

== Education ==
Thekkatte has a government school, Kuvempu Centenary Model Government Higher Primary School that provides education to its residents.

== Infrastructure ==
The village is situated on National Highway 66 and is 43 km away from the district capital of Udupi. The closest airport is in Mangalore (IXE).The nearest railway station is Kundapura Railway Station.

== See also ==
- Udupi
- Kundapura
