= Kedinje =

Kedinje (also known as Manjarapalke ) is a village in Karkala taluk of Karnataka, India.

== Location ==
Manjarapalke is located about 375 km (233 mi) from Bangalore. It lies between Karkala 12 km (7.5 mi) and Padubidri. A road from Manjarapalke goes to the interior of Bola, Beladi and Kanthavara as well. There is also a road to Moodbidri.

== Sport ==
Kambala or buffalo racing is also conducted in paddy fields. Korikatta (Cockfighting) is another favourite sport. To its supporters, cockfighting is an ancient sport in Manjarapalke held at the temples precincts in the northern parts of Kasaragod.

== Education ==
- Sri Vidya Bodhini Higher Primary School
