= Gavali, Udupi =

Gavali is a village located in Kundapura Taluk, Udupi District, Karnataka, India where pre-historic rock drawings are found.

== Archaeological findings ==
Rock drawings found at Gavali near Brahmastana Temple is in the form of engraving on a rock. Picture of a Humped Bull in line drawing is engraved on a rock and this line drawing is further extended to Rangoli drawings. Similar engraved drawings on rocks are found at Hire Benakal, Rampur in Bellary district, Sonda in Uttara Kannada District.

Stone tools in the form of single sided weapon and a sandstone weapon, belonging to New Stone Age period were found at this location. Weapons are made of dolorite stone and having fine surface and resemble spear.

The Stone Age site identified on a hillock 250 feet above sea level is dated c.800-600 BCE by noted historian Dr.A.Sundara and the rock engravings are dated c.2500 BCE and stone weapons found at this site are dated c.2000-1500 BCE.

Pre-historic site of Gavali is included in the list of Mesolithic sites found in Udupi District such as Avarse, Masikere, Guddettu, Kolanakallu, Nancharu, Sastavu near Petri etc.

== See also ==
- Sonda, Karnataka
