= Hattiangadi =

- village
- Country: India
- State: Karnataka
- District: Udupi

Languages
  - Official: Kannada
- Time zone: UTC+5:30 (IST)

Hattiangadi is a village in Kundapura taluk of Udupi district. The village is famous for the Shree Siddi Vinayaka temple dedicated to the God Ganesha.

The eighth-century-old Shree Siddhi Vinayaka temple is a historical and well-known pilgrimage centre for Hindus of the coast. Hattiyangadi (Pattinagara) was the capital of Alupa dynasty, who ruled the Tulunadu during seventh and eighth centuries. They had close ties with some other Jain religious sites such as Purigere (Lakshmeshwara) and Hombuja (Humcha). Later Hoysala and Honnekambala kings ruled Hattiyangadi, which was also known as Goshtipura, as it hosted a number of intellectual debates.

The village is also famous for many other ancient temples and Jaina basadis such as Gopalakrishna, Lokanatheshwara, Maraladevi, Shankaranarayan, Shivamunieeshwara, Ekantheshwara and Shaktharabrahma temples.

The village was once a capital of the Alupa dynasty, but is now a small village. It has still managed to retain its attraction with lush green mountains on one side and the curvaceous Varahi River on the other. On the bank of the river there is a spot called Aramane Adi, which earlier housed a palace. At an elevated spot nearby is the Chandranatha Basadi and behind it is the Jattiraya's Temple.

== Siddivinayaka Temple ==
Hattiangadi is well known for its Siddivinayaka Temple, which is supposed to have been constructed around the seventh or eighth century. The Lord Ganapathi Temple is situated on the bank of River Varahi. It is the only Temple in India, where the idol of Lord Vinayaka sports a jata-hair. The idol itself is carved of a Saligrama stone and is 2.5 feet high and Vinayaka's curly hair is left loose at the back. The trunk is bent towards the left.

It was a sacred place for the meditation of Sri Govindarama Yathivarya (Saint) during the 16th century. The Saint blessed his disciple and the then Temple priest Rama Bhatta, who later cultivated a number of poetic works and got the reputation as Kavi (poet) Rama. The saint had also predicted that the Temple would become famous worldwide during next three hundred years. Now, the Temple is attracting a number of devotees from all parts of the world.

It is believed that the idol may be in standing posture. The deity's right hand is situated inside the basement and holds a vessel full of Modakas in its left hand. According to experts, the deity is of Bala Ganesha, which has just two arms and various ornaments are also found on the idol. The statue grows in size every year and this is visible from the fact that it has outgrown the silver casting. The entire shrine is carved from black marble. Since the God is supposed to grant the wishes of the devotees, the title 'Siddi' is conferred on Lord Vinayaka.

Sahasra Narikela Ganayaga (a Yaga using 1008 coconuts), Sri Sathya Ganapathi Vratha, Laksha Doorvarchane, Sindhura (kumkum) Archane, and others poojas are offered here for Lord Vinayaka on special occasions such as Sankashtahara Chaturthi, Ganesha Chowthi, Navarathri and on every Tuesday, Friday and Sunday on the request of the devotees. Devotees are offering poojas such as Ashtadravyathmaka Ganahavana and Thrikala Pooja every day.

The renovated Temple was inaugurated in 1980 by the then Chief Minister of Karnataka Devaraj Arasu. The Temple was once again renovated and was built in granites in 1997. Thirty-two Ganapathi idols as explained in Mudgala Purana were also installed in the Temple premises. A Navagraha Mandir was also added. A concrete tower has been established on Tallur Vandse Highway to welcome the devotees coming to Hattiyangadi Siddhivinayaka Temple. The Temple is running the Central Gurukula English Medium residential school, which is intending to impart quality education.

The management is also developing the Varahi Thapovana (herbal plantation) at a cost of Rs one crore. This also includes Navagraha Vana, Rashivana, Nakshathravana Saptharshivana and Panchayathanavana as explained in Hindu Holy books. Thapovana covers a guesthouse, Guru Kuteera, fountain and other light and sound equipment intending to entertain visitors.

The temple's managing trustee, Sri Ramachandra Bhat, has overseen efforts to develop the temple's facilities and infrastructure, including the construction of an access road. The temple provides free meals to visiting devotees at Sri Balchandra Prasada, its dining hall, which can accommodate approximately 400–500 people at a time. The upper floor contains the Pravachana Mandir and Sabhagruha. Additional facilities include accommodation lodges, a choultry, a seminar hall, a yaga-shala, a goshala (cowshed), and a Kalyana Mantapa.

The Temple also houses the Siddivinayaka School of ancient scriptures, where students are given free accommodation, food, clothes and education. Various developmental activities are conducted with help of the money received in charity. Various cultural activities are held throughout the year along with state-level Yakshagana Kammata-workshop, study and demonstration of medicinal herbs and shrubs, agricultural and yoga camps etc.

== See also ==
- Tallur
- Basrur
- Barkur
- Kundapura
- Kollur
