= Cherkady =

- village
- Location in Karnataka, India Cherkady (India)
- Coordinates: 13.4456600°N 74.8136100°E
- Country: India
- State: Karnataka
- District: Udupi
- Talukas: Udupi

Government
  - Body: Gram panchayat
- Elevation: 38 m (125 ft)

Population (2001)
  - Total: 6,132

Languages
  - Official: Kannada
- Time zone: UTC+5:30 (IST)
- ISO 3166 code: IN-KA
- Vehicle registration: KA
- Website: karnataka.gov.in

Cherkady is a village in the southern state of Karnataka, India. It is located in the Udupi taluk of Udupi district in Karnataka.

== Demographics ==
As of 2001 India census, Cherkady had a population of 6132 with 2970 males and 3162 females.

== Education ==
- R.K.Patkar Higher Primary school (1 to 7 standard classes)
- Sharada High School (8 to 10 standard classes )

== Geography ==
Cherkady is surrounded by other villages including Aroor and Nelavara to the west, Kokkarne and Karje to the north, and Suralu and Adapadi to the east.

== Culture ==
Cherkady's ancient temples are Shri Durga Parameshwari temple Kannaru and Halvali Math.

== Economy ==
The village's economy depends on agriculture, poultry and dairy. Most farmers grow paddy and other crops. Youths are attracted to government jobs. Cashew and bidi industries are numerous in the village.

A weekly fair in every Saturday at Pethri allows farmers and other petty merchants to sell their items.

== See also ==
- Udupi
- Districts of Karnataka
