= Kumbashi =

Kumbhashi
- village
- Location in Karnataka, India Kumbhashi (India)
- Coordinates: 13.569380°N 74.704572°E
- Country: India
- State: Karnataka
- District: Udupi
- Time zone: UTC+5:30 (IST)
- ISO 3166 code: IN-KA
- Website: karnataka.gov.in

Kumbhashi is a village in the Kundapura taluk of Udupi district, India. It lies en route from Udupi towards Kundapura on the National Highway 66 (Formerly NH-17). The Vinayaka Temple is located on hillock called Anegudde

One of the best known temples to Ganesha in Udupi district is that of Shri Maha Ganapathi at Kumbhashi. Kumbhashi is one of the seven "Mukti Sthalas" (Parashurama Kshetra) in coastal Karnataka. Kumbashi Ganapati temple is mentioned in Tirtha Prabandha written by Madhwa tradition saint Shri Vadiraja Tirtha.
