= Hiriadka =

Hiriadka Hiriyadka
- Town
- Location in Karnataka, India Hiriadka (Karnataka)
- Coordinates: 13°21′N 74°52′E
- Country: India
- State: Karnataka
- District: Udupi
  - Density: 800/km^{2} (2,100/sq mi)

Languages
  - Official: Kannada
  - Regional: Tulu, Konkani
- Time zone: UTC+5:30 (IST)
- PIN: 576113
- Vehicle registration: KA-20
- Nearest city/town: Manipal, Karkala
- Sex ratio: 1000:962 ♂/♀
- Literacy: 92%
- Lok Sabha constituency: Udupi Chikmagalur

Hiriadka (Periyadka in Tulu) is a town in the Udupi District in the Indian state of Karnataka. It is quite close to Udupi. It is 15 km from Udupi and 24 km from Karkala. It lies on the Udupi-Hebri road and is famous for the fair along with a festival called Siri Utsava/Siri Jaatre which happens every year in the month of April–May. Visitors from Udupi,Shimoga and Dakshina Kannada districts are attracted to this popular fair. The Swarna River flows about 1 km from Hiriadka. After the renovation of the Sri Veerabhadra temple, Hiriadka has gained more popularity because of its attractive craftworks.
