= Hebri =

Hebri Hebberi
- town
- Location in Karnataka, India Hebri (India)
- Coordinates: 13°28′N 74°59′E
- Country: India
- State: Karnataka

Government

Population
  - Total: 11,071

Languages
  - Local: Tulu, Kundagannada
- Time zone: UTC+5:30 (IST)
- Vehicle registration: KA-20
- Nearest city: Udupi
- Lok Sabha constituency: Udupi Chikmagalur (Lok Sabha constituency)
- MP: Kota Srinivas Poojary
- Vidhana Sabha constituency: Karkala

Hebri is a town and taluk headquarters of Hebri taluk in the Udupi district of Karnataka state, at the foot of the Western Ghats of Republic of India . Hebri taluk was carved as a separate revenue taluk from Karkala taluk in the year 2018 A.D.. It is a main junction and a central point of roads leading to Mangalore, Brahmavar, Karkala, Kundapura, Agumbe, Shivamogga and Udupi. The area's forests receive high rainfall throughout the year. Someshwara Wildlife Sanctuary is located nearby, which covers the entire route till Agumbe and the western Ghats. The sanctuary houses a number of endangered species including the King Cobra. Hebri taluk was reported for Naxalite activities and key naxalite was Vikram Gowda was killed in an encounter with Anti Naxal Force (ANF) of Karnataka state police on 18 November 2024 at Pithubail,Nadpalu village of Hebri taluk

The local languages are Tulu which is widely spoken and Kundagannada.

== Economy ==
The economy of Hebri is mainly dependent on agriculture, including rice (paddy), areca nut, coconut, and cashew nut. Nowadays rubber is also grown on foothills of the western ghats. In and around Hebri are many factories which process cashew nuts, coconuts, and rice, particularly parboiled rice. Hebri has a number schools, colleges, a Community Health Centre (CHC), police station a petrol pump. The National Highway 169A connecting Udupi town with Agumbe passes through Hebri.
