= Kundagannada dialect =

Kannada dialect of India

Kundagannada
- Native to: Karnataka
- Language family: Dravidian: Southern; Southern I; Tamil–Kannada; Kannada–Badaga; Kannadoid; Kannada; Coastal; Kundagannada
- Writing system: Kannada script

Language codes
- ISO 639-3: –
- Glottolog: kund1259

Kundagannada, also known as Kundapra bhashi or Kundapura Kannada, is a regional dialect of Kannada spoken by people residing in the Kundapura, Byndoor, Brahmavar and Hebri taluks of Udupi District. While it maintains the core structure of Kannada, it incorporates Tulu influences, particularly in local terms and expressions. The language is also shaped by the region's geography, nestled between the Western Ghats and the Arabian Sea, leading to unique words, vocabulary and pronunciations specific to the coastal environment. This dialect of Kannada is a distinctive cultural marker for the local community, reflecting both linguistic and geographical influences.
