= Brahmavar =

Brahmavara
- Town
- Location in India
- Coordinates: 13.404°N 74.707°E
- Country: India
- State: Karnataka
- District: Udupi District

Population
  - Total: 131,203

Languages
  - Official: Kannada
  - Regional: Kundagannada, Tulu.
- Time zone: UTC+5:30 (IST)
- PIN: 576213
- Telephone code: 0820
- Vehicle registration: KA-20

Brahmavar is a taluk in Udupi district located on NH 66 (formerly NH 17), 13 kilometres (8.1 mi) north of the Udupi in Karnataka, India.

== Location ==
Brahmavara is about 68 kilometres (40 mi) north of Mangalore and about 13 kilometres (10 mi) north of Udupi on the National highway NH 66 (formerly NH 17). The Suvarna and Sita Rivers, originating in Western Ghats, form backwaters around Brahmavara before joining the Arabian Sea near Hangarkatte.

Brahmavara is surrounded by several villages, including Handadi, Baikady, Pethri, Kunjal, Kumragod, Salikeri, Haradi and Matapadi. Barkur is to the north of Brahmavara, and the temple city Udupi to its south.
