= Byndoor =

- Town
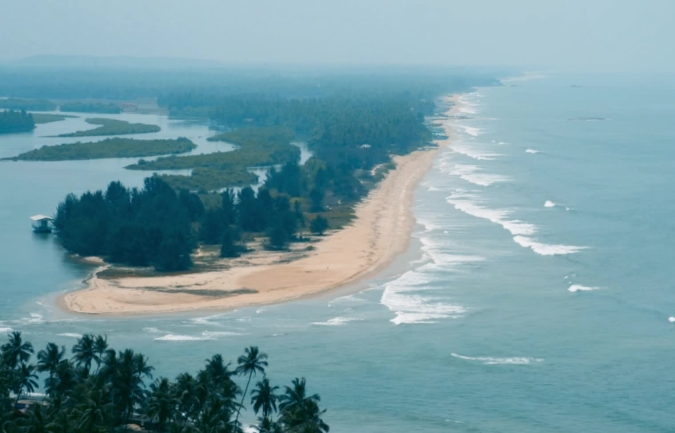
- Byndoor Someshwara Beach

- Location in Karnataka, India
- Coordinates: 13.866°N 74.6333°E
- Country: India
- State: Karnataka
- District: Udupi
- Taluk: Byndoor

Government
  - Type: Municipality
  - Body: Town Panchayat

Area
  - Total: 8.87 km^{2} (3.42 sq mi)
  - Rank: 1st in (Shivamogga)
- Elevation: 685 m (2,247 ft)

Population (2011)
  - Total: 24,986
  - Density: 2,820/km^{2} (7,300/sq mi)

Languages
  - Official: Kannada
  - Regional: Kundagannada Konkani
- Time zone: UTC+5:30 (IST)
- PIN: 576214
- Telephone code: 08254
- Vehicle registration: KA 20
- Lok Sabha constituency: Shivamogga
- Vidhana Sabha constituency: Byndoor
- Website: www.baindurutown.mrc.gov.in

Byndoor is a taluk and Town Panchayat in Udupi, Karnataka, India.

== Railway station ==
Byndoor City is served by Mookambika Road Byndoor railway station, one of the major railway stations in coastal Karnataka in South India. Its four-letter code is BYNR. Trains connect the station to prominent state capitals of India, including Bangalore, Thiruvananthapuram (via Southern Railway), Mumbai, and (via Konkan Railways). The station was established in 1997.

A total of 34 express and passenger trains stop there. The Mookambika Road-Kannur Passenger train used to start and end at the station, however this service was terminated in 2017 due to lack of revenue generation.
