= Outline of Karnataka =

Overview of and topical guide to Karnataka

Location of Karnataka

The following outline is provided as an overview of and topical guide to Karnataka:

Karnataka is the 6th biggest, 8th most populous, 13th highest and 16th most literate state of the 28 states of the democratic Republic of India. Karnataka is ranked 3rd in the country in tax revenue and 7th in the country in GDP. Karnataka is at 8th position in life expectancy and 11th in female-to-male sex ratio among the states in India. Karnataka is at 7th most media exposed states in India.

Seal of Karnataka

== General reference ==
=== Names ===
- Common name: Karnataka
- Previously known as :State of Mysore
  - Pronunciation: /kərˈnɑːtəkə, kɑːr-/
- Official name: Karnāṭaka
- Nicknames: Kannada nādu, Karunādu
- Adjectivals
  - Karnataka
  - Karnāṭakadavaru/Karnatakan
  - Canarese
- Demonyms
  - Kannadigaru
  - Kannadigas
  - Canarese
- Abbreviations and name codes
  - ISO 3166-2 code: IN-KA
  - Vehicle registration code: KA

=== Rankings (amongst India's states) ===
- by population: 8th
- by area: 6th
- by crime rate (2016): 12th
- by gross domestic product (GDP) (2019): 3rd
- by Human Development Index (HDI): 18th
- by life expectancy at birth: 10th
- by literacy rate: 23rd

== Geography ==
Geography of Karnataka

- Karnataka is: an Indian state, a state of the Republic of India.
- Rainfall in Karnataka

=== Location of Karnataka ===
- Karnataka is situated within the following regions:
  - Northern Hemisphere
  - Eastern Hemisphere
    - Eurasia
      - Asia
        - South Asia
          - Indian subcontinent
            - India
              - South India
- Time zone: Indian Standard Time (UTC+05:30)

The state has three principal geographical zones:

1. Karavali
2. Malenadu
3. Bayaluseeme

=== East flowing rivers ===
26 east-flowing rivers.

- Amarja
- Arkavathy River
- Bhadra River
- Chakra River
- Dandavathi
- Ghataprabha River
- Hemavati River
- Honnuhole River
- Kabini River
- Kaveri River
- Kedaka River
- Krishna River
- Kubja River
- Lakshmana Tirtha River
- Malaprabha River
- Palar River
- Panchagangavalli River
- Penner River
- Ponnaiyar River
- Shimsha
- South Pennar River
- Tunga River
- Tungabhadra River
- Varada
- Vedavathi River
- Vrishabhavathi River

=== West flowing rivers ===
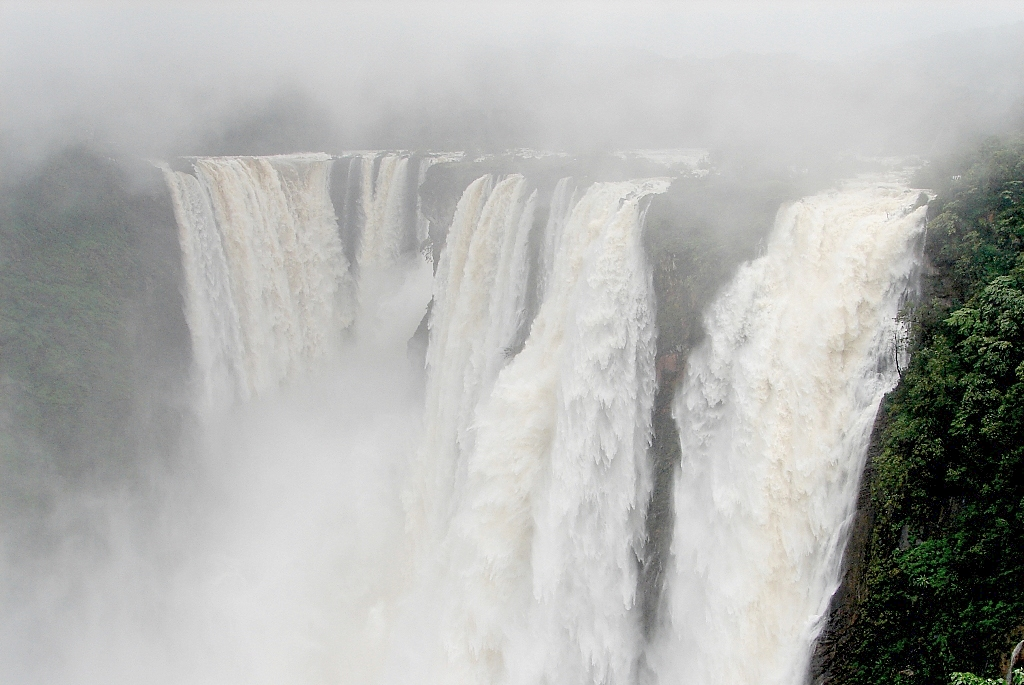
Jog Falls are the highest plunge waterfalls in India, formed by Sharavathi River.

10 west-flowing rivers, providing 60% of state's inland water resources.

- Gangavalli River
- Aghanashini River
- Kali River
- Kumaradhara River
- Shambhavi River
- Varahi River
- Souparnika River
- Sharavathi River
- Kumadvathi River
- Netravati River
- Gurupura River

=== Reservoirs ===
- Alamatti
- Linganamakki
- Bhadra reservoir
- Tungabhadra dam, Hospete
- Krishna Raja Sagara
- Tippagondanahalli Reservoir
- Haringi dam
- Gorur dam.
- Kabini dam.
- Navilatirtha Dam, Saundatti taluka of Belgaum District

=== Lakes ===
- Lakes in Bangalore
- Mysore city lakes
- Unkal lake, Hubli
- Fort Lake Belgaum
- Heggeri Lake, Haveri
- Hagari Jalashaya, Malavi

== Administrative divisions ==
=== Districts of Karnataka ===
Districts of Karnataka

Districts of Karnataka There are 30 districts in Karnataka:

- Bagalkote
- Bengaluru Rural
- Bengaluru Urban
- Belagavi
- Bellary
- Bidar
- Vijayapura
- Chamarajanagar
- Chikkaballapur
- Chikkamagaluru
- Chitradurga
- Dakshina Kannada
- Davanagere
- Dharwad
- Gadag
- Kalburgi
- Hassan
- Haveri
- Kodagu
- Kolar
- Koppal
- Mandya
- Mysuru
- Raichur
- Ramanagara
- Shimoga
- Tumakuru
- Udupi
- Uttara Kannada
- Yadgir

=== Taluks of Karnataka ===
Taluks of Karnataka

- Afzalpur
- Aland
- Alanvara
- Alur
- Anekal
- Ankola
- Annigeri
- Arkalgud
- Arsikere
- Athani
- Babaleshwar
- Badami
- Bagalkot
- Bagepalli
- Bailahongal
- Bangarapet
- Bantwal
- Basavakalyan
- Basavana Bagevadi
- Belgaum
- Bellary
- Beltangadi
- Belur
- Bengaluru East
- Bengaluru North
- Bengaluru South
- Bhadravati
- Bhalki
- Bhatkal
- Bidar
- Bidar
- Bijapur
- Bilagi
- Brahmavara
- Byadgi
- Baindur
- Chadchan
- Challakere
- Chamrajnagar
- Channagiri
- Channarayapattana
- Chik Ballapur
- Chikmagalur
- Chiknayakanhalli
- Chikodi
- Chincholi
- Chintamani
- Chitapur
- Chitgoppa
- Chitradurga
- Dandeli
- Davanagere
- Devadurga
- Devanhalli
- Devar Hipparagi
- Dharwad
- Doddaballapura
- Gadag-Betigeri
- Gangawati
- Ganjendragad
- Gauribidanur
- Gokak
- Gubbi
- Gudibanda
- Kalaburagi
- Guledgudda
- Gundlupet
- Gurmitkal
- Hagaribommanahalli
- Haliyal
- Hangal
- Hanur
- Harihar
- Harpanahalli
- Hassan
- Haveri
- Heggadadevanakote
- Hirekerur
- Hiriyur
- Holalkere
- Holenarsipur
- Homnabad
- Honavar
- Honnali
- Hoovina Hadagalli
- Hosanagara
- Hosdurga
- Hoskote
- Hospet
- Hubli city
- Hubli
- Hukkeri
- Hulsoor
- Hungund
- Hunsagi
- Hunsur
- Ilkal
- Indi
- Jagalur
- Jamkhandi
- Jevargi
- Joida
- Kadaba
- Kadur
- Kagawad
- Kalghatgi
- kanakapura
- Kamalapura
- Kamalnagar
- Kampli
- Kanakagiri
- Karatagi
- Karkal
- Karwar
- Khanapur
- Kittur
- Kolar
- Kolhar
- Kollegal
- Koppa
- Koppal
- Koratagere
- Kotturu
- Krishnarajanagar
- Krishnarajpet
- Kudligi
- Kukanur
- Kumta
- Kundapura
- Kundgol
- Kunigal
- Kurugodu
- Kushtagi
- Lakshmeshwara
- Lingsugur
- Maddur
- Madhugiri
- Madikeri
- Malavalli
- Malur
- Mandya
- Mangalore
- Manvi
- Maski
- Molakalmuru
- Moodbidri
- Mudalgi
- Muddebihal
- Mudhol
- Mudigere
- Mulbagal
- Mundargi
- Mundgod
- Mysore
- Nagamangala
- Nanjangud
- Narasimharajapura
- Nargund
- Navalgund
- Nelmangala
- Nidagundi
- Nipani
- Nyamati
- Pandavapura
- Pavagada
- Piriyapatna
- Puttur
- Rabkavi Banhatti
- Raichur
- Ramdurg
- Ranibennur
- Raybag
- Ron
- Sagar
- Sakleshpur
- Sanduru
- Saundatti
- Savanur
- Sedam
- Shahabad
- Shahpur
- Shiggaon
- Shikaripura
- Shimoga
- Shirahatti
- Shorapur
- Shrirangapattana
- Siddapur
- Sidlaghatta
- Sindagi
- Sindhnur
- Sira
- Sirsi
- Siruguppa
- Sirwar
- Somvarpet
- Sorab
- Sringeri
- Srinivaspur
- Sulya
- Talikota
- Tarikere
- Tikota
- Tiptur
- Tirthahalli
- Tirumakudalu Narasipura
- Tumkur
- Turuvekere
- Udupi
- Vadagera
- Virajpet
- Yadgir
- Yadrami
- Yelahanka
- Yelandur
- Yelbarga
- Yellapur

== Demographics ==
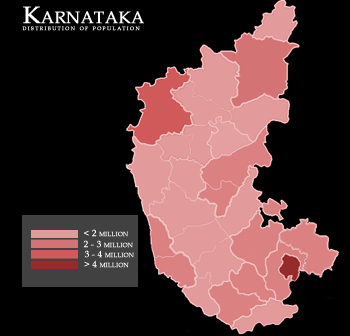
Distribution of population in Karnataka

- Demographics of Karnataka
- Economy of Karnataka
- Religion in Karnataka

Religion in Karnataka
| Hindus | 83% |
| Muslim | 12.2% |
| Christian | 3.1% |
| Others | 1.7% |

Languages in Karnataka
| Kannada | 64.8% |
| Urdu | 9.7% |
| Telugu | 8.3% |
| Tamil | 3.8% |
| Tulu | 5.4% |
| konkani | 5.4% |
| Marathi | 4% |
| other | 4% |

== Government and politics of Karnataka ==
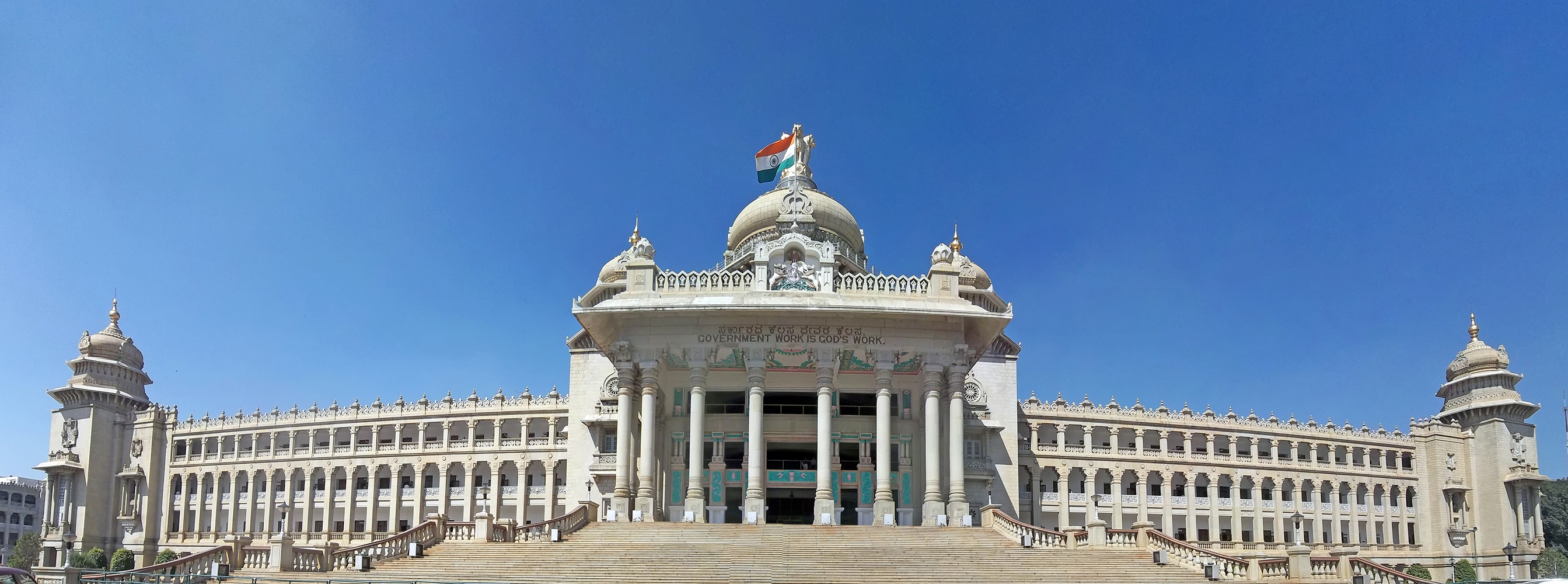
The Vidhana Soudha

Politics of Karnataka

- Form of government: Indian state government (parliamentary system of representative democracy)
- Capital of Karnataka: Bengaluru
- Elections in Karnataka
  - (specific elections)
- Unification of Karnataka

=== Union government in Karnataka ===
- Rajya Sabha members from Karnataka
- Karnataka Pradesh Congress Committee
- Indian general election, 2009 (Karnataka)
- Indian general election, 2014 (Karnataka)

=== Branches of the government of Karnataka ===
Government of Karnataka

==== Executive branch of the government of Karnataka ====
- Head of state: Governor of Karnataka
- Head of government: Chief Minister of Karnataka
- Council of Ministers of Karnataka

==== Legislative branch of the government of Karnataka ====
Karnataka Legislative Assembly

- Constituencies of Karnataka Legislative Assembly

==== Judicial branch of the government of Karnataka ====
- High Court of Karnataka
  - Chief Justice of Karnataka

=== Law and order in Karnataka ===
Law of Karnataka

- Law enforcement in Karnataka
  - Karnataka Police

=== Human rights ===
- LGBTQ rights in Karnataka

== History ==
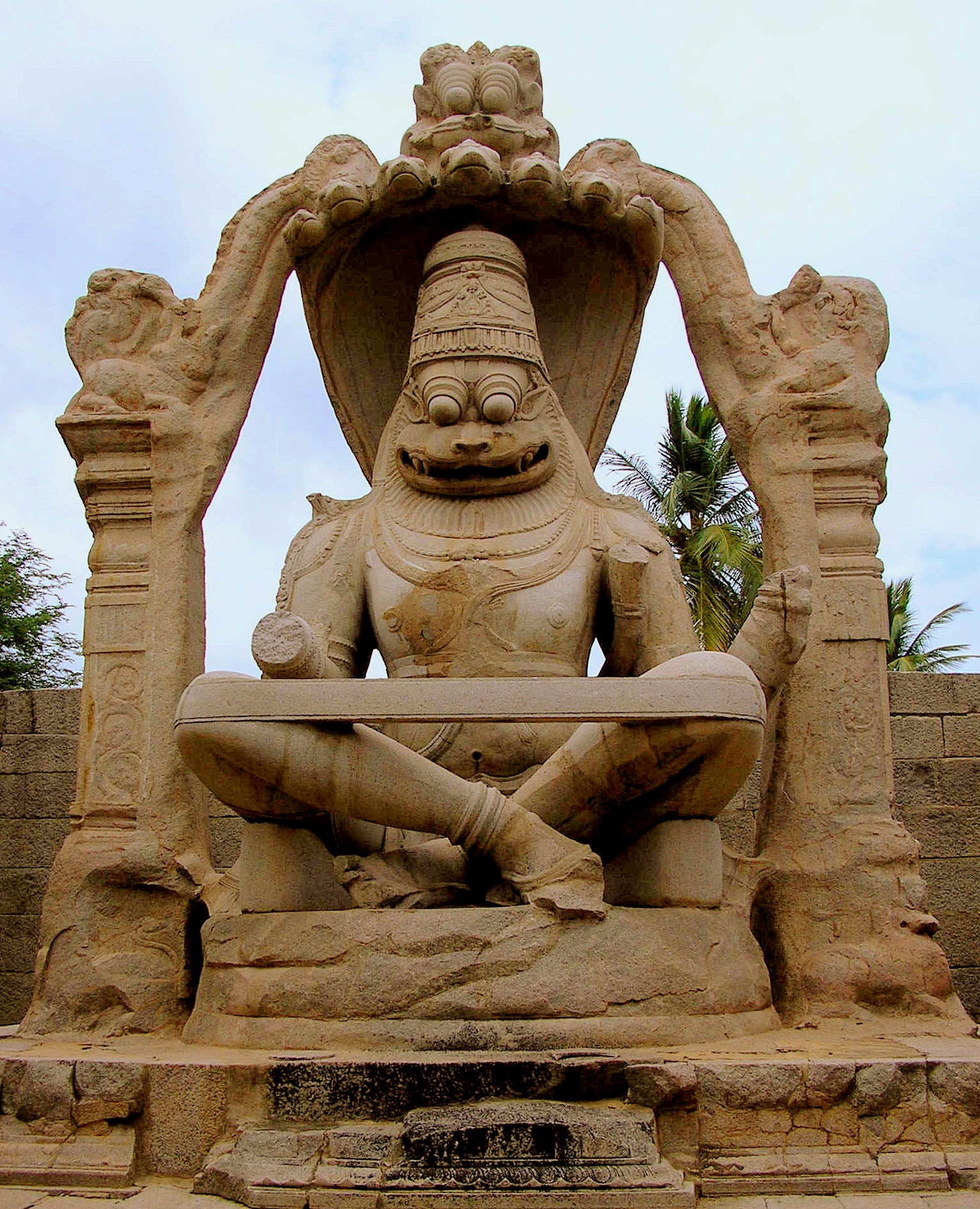
Statue of Ugranarasimha at Hampi (a World Heritage Site), located within the ruins of Vijayanagara, the former capital of the Vijayanagara Empire.

History of Karnataka
Political history of medieval Karnataka
Etymology of Karnataka

- Nanda Empire
- Mauryan Empire of Emperor Ashoka
- Satavahana
- Kadambas
- Kadamba Dynasty founded by Mayurasharma
- Western Ganga Dynasty
- Badami Chalukyas
- Rashtrakuta Empire of Manyakheta
- Western Chalukya Empire
- Hoysalas
- Vijayanagara Empire
- Nayakas of Chitradurga
- Madakari Nayaka
- Kempegowda
- Moghuls
- architecture
- literature
- Literature
- literary metres
- Vesara style of architecture
- Indo-Saracenic
- Battle of Talikota
- Nizam of Hyderabad
- Tippu Sultan
- Ekikarana Movement

== Culture ==
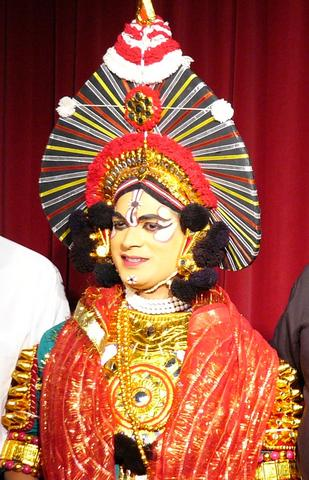
A yakshagana artist

Art and culture of Karnataka

- Carnatic music
- Architecture of Karnataka
- Cuisine of Karnataka
- Kannada people
- Tulu people
- Kodava people
- Beary people
- Konkani people
- Folk arts of Karnataka
- Cinema of Karnataka
- Languages
  - Kannada language
  - Tulu language
  - Kodava language
  - Konkani language
  - Beary language
- Dances
  - Gubbi Veeranna Nataka Company
  - Veeragase
  - Kamsale
  - Dollu Kunitha
  - Bharatanatya
  - Dollu Kunitha
  - Bhuta Kola
  - Yakshagana
  - Nagaradhane
  - Gaarudi Gombe
  - Togalu Gombeyaata
  - Veeragase

=== Symbols of Karnataka ===
Symbols of Karnataka

- State animal: Indian Elephant
- State bird: Indian roller
- State flower: Lotus
- State seal: Seal of Karnataka
- State tree: Sandalwood

== Tourism ==
Different tourist places in Karnataka.

=== North Karnataka ===
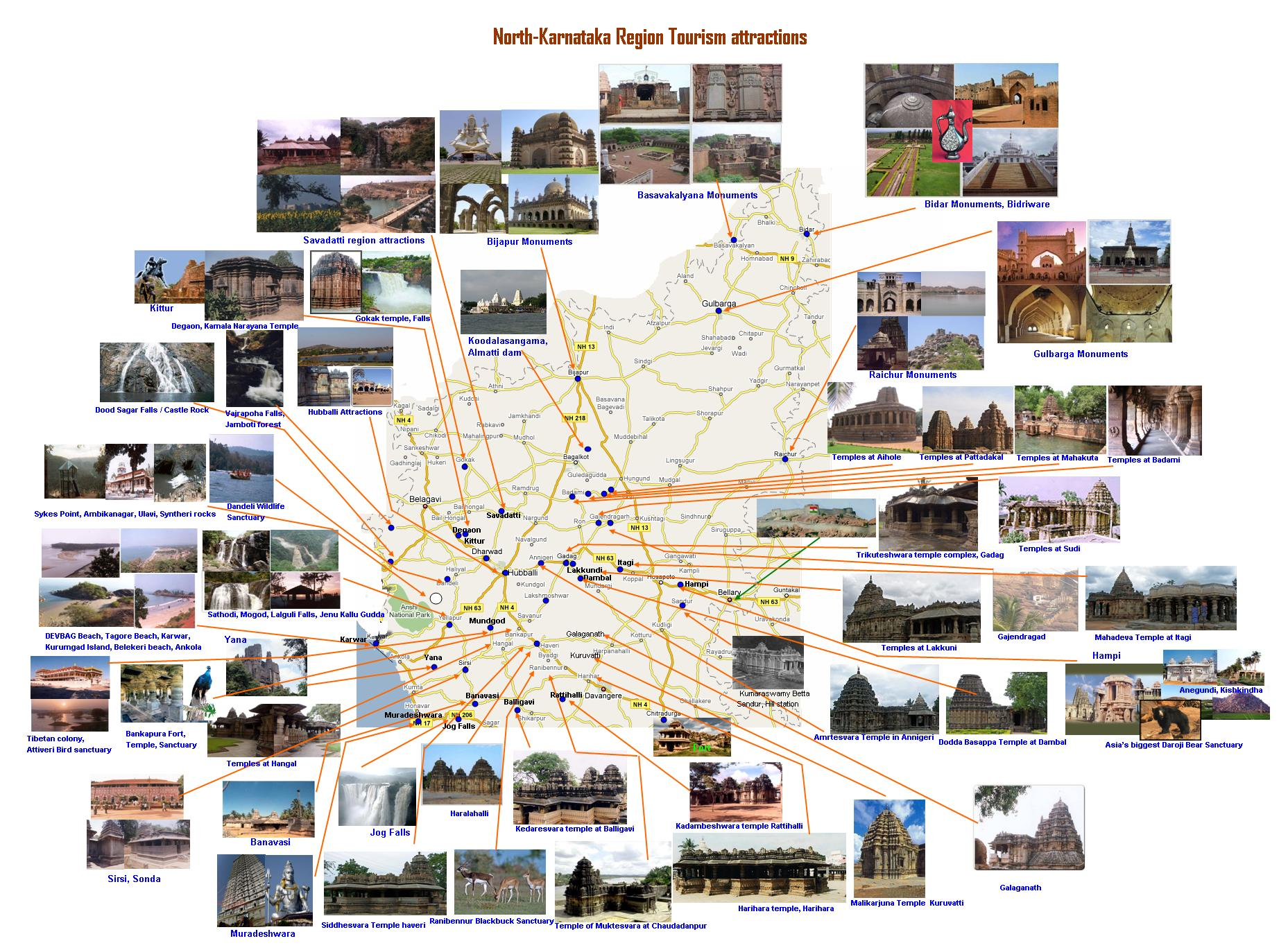
North Karnataka Region Tourism

- World heritage centres

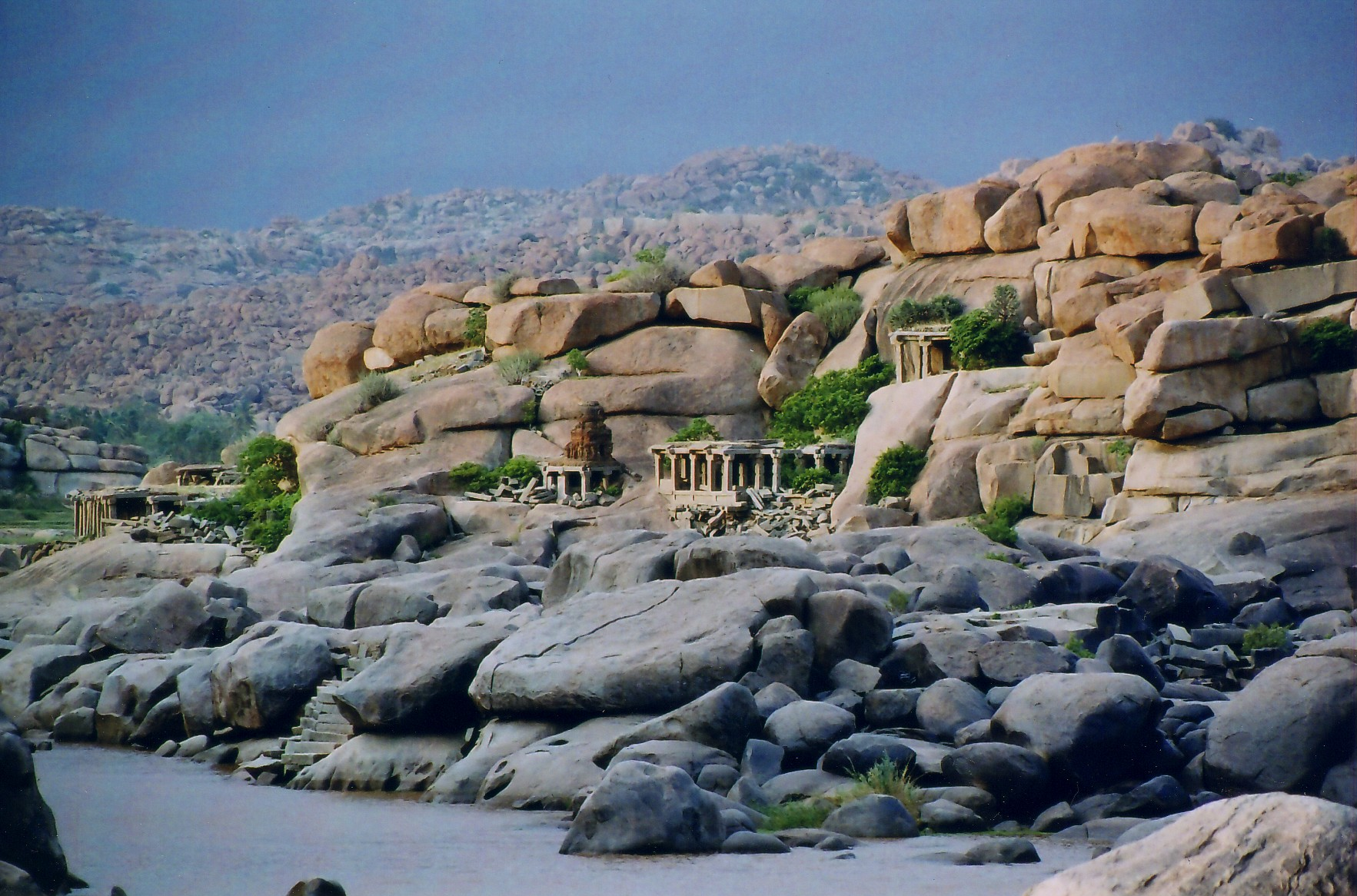
Hampi

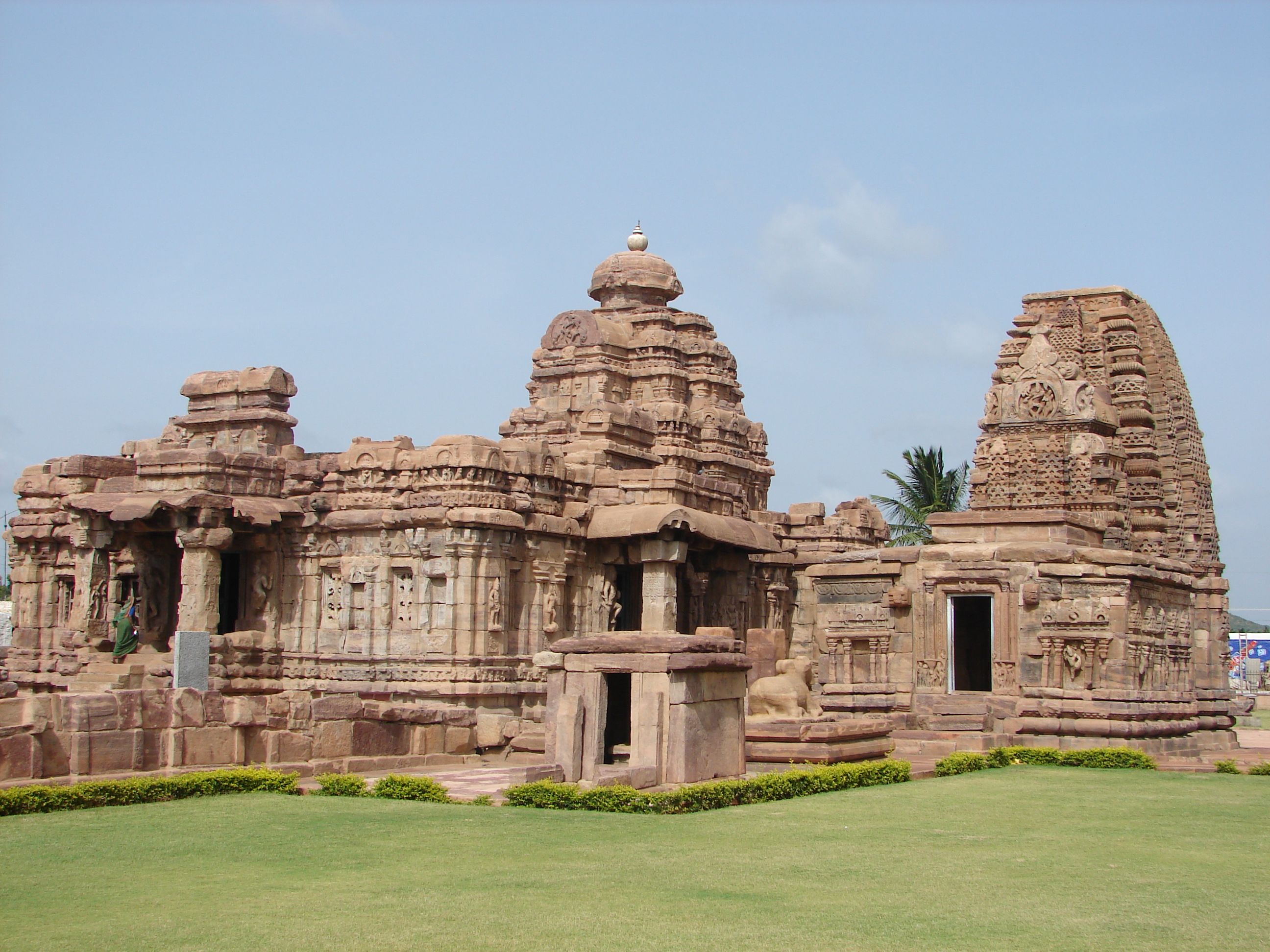
Group of monuments At Pattadakal

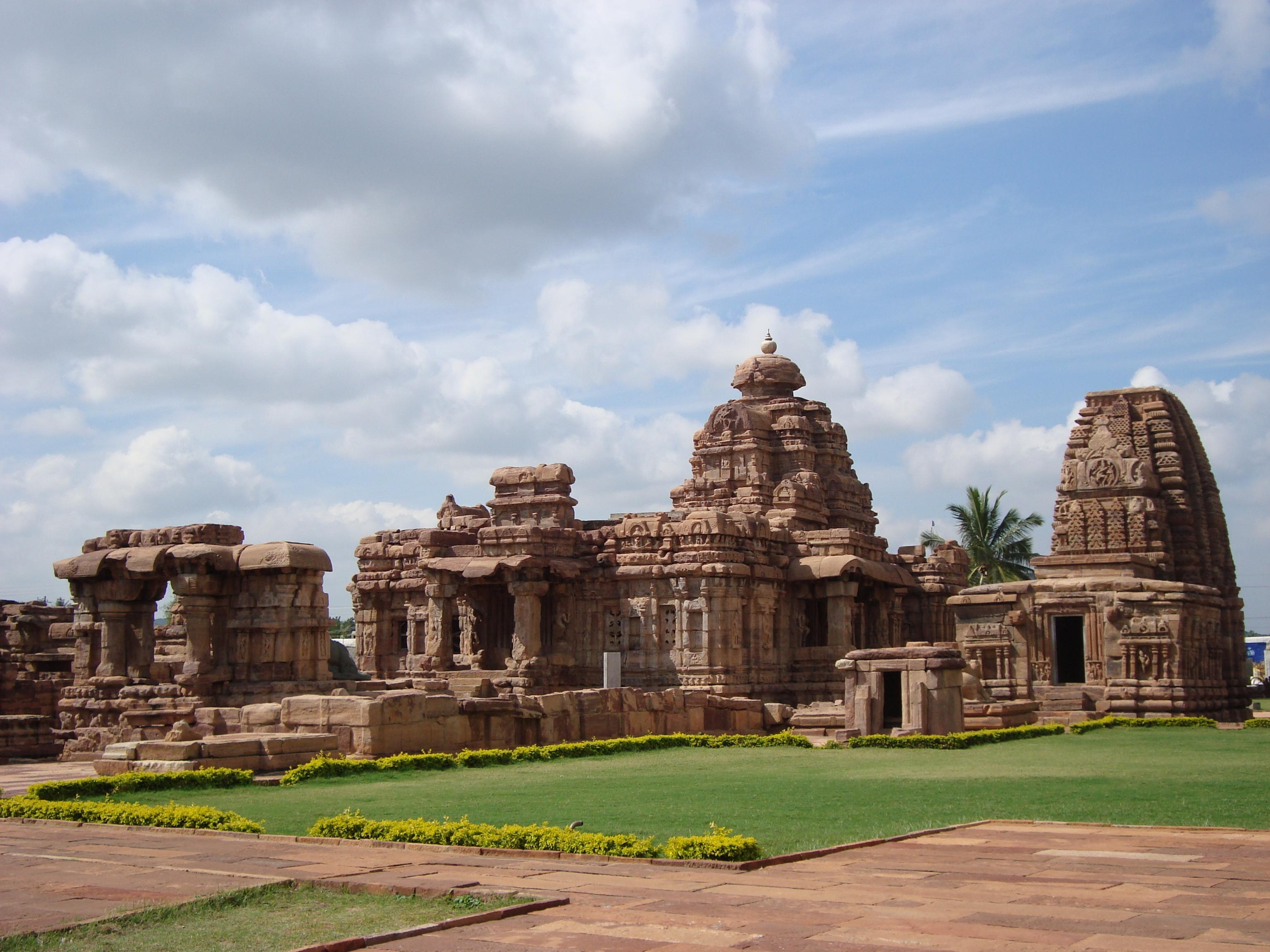
Mallikarjuna and Kasivisvanatha temples at Pattadakal

  - Hampi
  - Group of 8th century CE monuments, Pattadakal:
- Historical locations
  - Western Chalukya
    - Aihole:
    - Badami:
    - Basavana Bagewadi
    - Basavakalyana,
    - Bidar District
    - Annigeri
    - Bankapura
    - Dambal
    - Haveri
    - Gadag
    - Lakkundi
    - Someshwara temple complex Lakshmeshwar
    - Galaganatha Galageshwara temple
    - Chaudayyadanapura
    - Mahadeva Temple (Itagi)
    - Shambulinga Temple Kundgol
    - Hooli Panchalingeshwara Temple
    - Lakshmeshwar
    - Kudalasangama
  - Rashtrakuta dynasty
    - Malkhed, Kalaburagi district
    - Naregal, Gadag District
  - Kadamba dynasty
    - Halasi
    - Hangal
    - Banavasi
  - Deccan Sultanates
    - Bijapur jaws are trying to devour an elephant.
    - Bidar:
    - Gulbarga
    - Raichur
    - Lakshmeshwar
  - Rattas
    - Saundatti
  - Forts
    - Basavakalyan Fort
    - Bidar Fort
    - Gulbarga Fort
    - Savadatti Fort
    - Bellary Fort
    - Sandur Fort
    - Gajendragad
    - Nargund fort
  - Other
    - Sonda
    - Ulavi
    - Yana
    - Utsav Rock Garden, Shiggaon

=== Coastal Karnataka ===
- Gokarna
- Mangalore
- Udupi
- Karkala
- Venur
- Malpe Beach
- Panambur Beach
- Kukke Subramanya
- Dharmastala
- Kollur
- Moodabidre
- Bhatkal
- Honnavar
- Ankola
- Murudeshwar
- Karwar

=== South Karnataka ===
- Bengaluru
- Mysuru
- Belur
- Halebidu
- Arasikere
- Aralaguppe
- Madhugiri
- Sira
- Yediyur
- Madikeri
- Srirangapattana
- Melukote
- Maddur
- Nanjanagudu
- Talakadu
- Bhadravathi
- Ikkeri
- Sravanabelgola
- Somnathpur
- Jog Falls
- Mekedatu
- Hesaraghatta
- Shivanasamudram
- Hogenakkal Falls
- Devarayanadurga

== See also ==
Karnataka

- Outline of India
- Kannada
- Kannada people
- Kannada language
