= Geography of Karnataka =

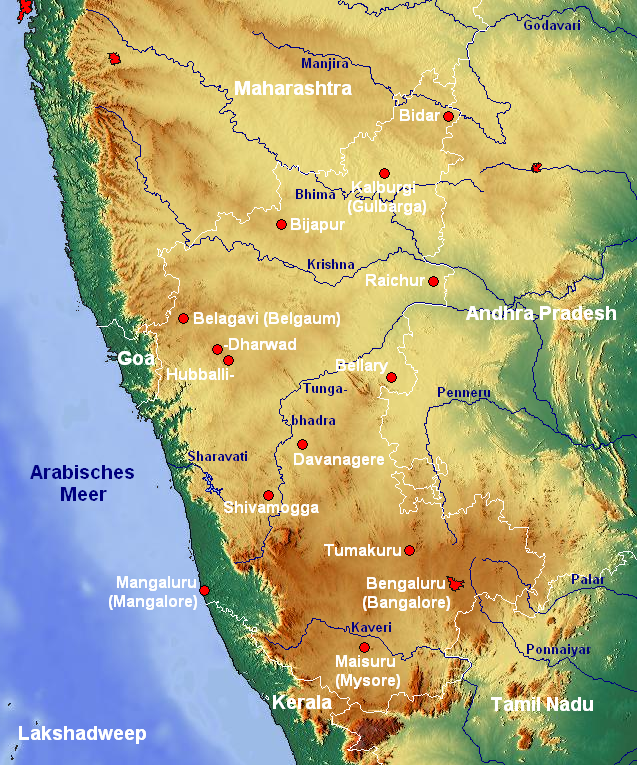
Topographic map of Karnataka. Western Ghats are parallel to the coast.

The Indian State of Karnataka is located between 11°30' North and 18°30' North latitudes and between 74° East and 78°30' East longitude.It is situated on a tableland where the Western Ghats and Eastern Ghats converge into the complex, in the western part of the Deccan Peninsular region of India. The State is bounded by Maharashtra and Goa States in the north and northwest; by the Lakshadweep Sea in the west; by Kerala in the south-west and Tamil Nadu in the south and south-east, Andhra Pradesh in the south-east and east and Telangana in the north-east. Karnataka extends to about 850 km (530 mi) from north to south and about 450 km (280 mi) from east to west.

Karnataka is situated in the Deccan Plateau and is bordered by the Arabian Sea to the west, Goa to the northwest, Maharashtra to the north, Andhra Pradesh to the southeast and east, Telangana to the east, Tamil Nadu to the south and southeast, and Kerala to the southwest. It is situated at the angle where the Western Ghats and Eastern Ghats of South India converge into the Nilgiri hills. The highest point in Karnataka is the Mullayanagiri hill in Chikkamagaluru district which has an altitude of 1,929 metres (6,329 ft) above sea level.

== Physiography ==
The state is divisible in to three distinct geomorphic zones:

- The coastal plains, called the Karavali area lies between the Western Ghats and the Arabian Sea. The Karavali are lowlands, with moderate to high rainfall levels. This strip is around 320 km (200 mi) in length and 48–64 km (30–40 mi) wide.
- The Western Ghats, called Malenadu, is a mountain range running parallel to the Arabian Sea trending NNW-SSE, rising to about 900 m (3,000 ft) average height with some peaks over 1,000 m (3,300 ft) above sea level. The mountain range is around 40 km (25 mi) wide and with moderate to high rainfall levels.
- The Deccan Plateau, called Bayalu Seeme, comprising the main inland region of the state, with an average elevation of 650 m (2,130 ft) above sea level. The plateau is relatively dry and verging on the semi-arid. The plateau is scattered with narrow ridges, and hills of schistose rock and granitic boulders.

Karnataka has one of the highest average elevations of Indian states, at 1,500 feet (460 m). The highest recorded temperature was 45.6 °C (114.08 °F) at Raichuru on 23 May 1928. The lowest recorded temperature was 2.8 °C (37.04 °F) at Bidar on 16 December 1918.

== Area and population ==
Karnataka has a total land area of 191,791 km² and accounts for 5.83% of the total area of the country (measured at 3,288,000 km²). This puts it in seventh place in terms of size. With a population of 6,11,30,704, it occupies eighth place in terms of population. The population density which stands at 319 persons per km² is lower than the all-India average of 382.

== Mineral resource ==
Karnataka is rich in mineral wealth which is distributed fairly evenly across the state. Karnataka's Geological Survey department started in 1880 is one of the oldest in the country. Rich deposits of asbestos, bauxite, chromite, dolomite, gold, iron ore, kaolin, limestone, magnesite, Manganese, ochre, quartz, and silica sand are found in the state. Karnataka is also a major producer of felsite, molding sand (63%), and fuchsite quartzite (57%) in the country.

Karnataka has two major centers of gold mining in the state Kolar and Raichur. These mines produce about 3000 kg of gold per annum which accounts for almost 84% of the country's production. Karnataka has very rich deposits of high-grade iron and manganese ores to the tune of 1,000 million tonnes. Most of the iron ores are concentrated around the Ballari-Hosapete region. Karnataka with a granite rock spread of over 4200 km² is also famous for its Ornamental Granites with different hues.

== Geology ==
According to Radhakrishnan and Vaidyanadhan (1997), there are four main types of geological formations in Karnataka:

- The Archean complex made up of Dharwad schists and granitic gneisses: These cover around 60% of the area of the state and consist of gneisses, granites and charnockite rocks. Some of the minerals found in this region are dolomite, limestone, gabbro, quartzite, pyroxenite, manganese and iron ores and metabasalt.
- The Proterozoic non-fossiliferous sedimentary formations of the Kaladgi and Bhima series: The Kaladgi series has horizontal rocks consists of sandstone, metabasalt, limestone, trapstone that run for 160 km (99 mi) in the districts of Belagavi, Raichuru, Dharwad and Vijayapura districts. The Bhima series that is present on either side of the Bhima River consists of rocks containing sandstone, limestone and shale and this is present in the Kalaburagi and Vijayapura districts.
- The Deccan trappean and intertrappean deposits: This is a part of the Deccan Traps which were formed by the accumulation of basaltic lava. This is made up of greyish to black augite-basalt.
- The tertiary and recent laterites and alluvial deposits: Laterite capping are found over the Deccan Traps and were formed after the cessation of volcanic activity in the early tertiary period. These are found in many districts in the Deccan Plateau and also in the coast.

== Soil types ==
Soil map

Eleven groups of soil orders are found in Karnataka. Entisols, Inceptisols, Mollisols, Spodosols, Alfisols, Ultisols, Oxisols, Aridisols, Vertisols, Andisols and Histosols. Depending on the agricultural capability of the soil, the soil types are divided into six types., Red, lateritic (lateritic soil is found in bidar and kolar district), black, alluvio-colluvial, forest and coastal soils. The common types of soil groups found in Karnataka are:

- Red soils: Red gravelly loam soil, Red loam soil, Red gravelly clay soil, Red clay soil
- Black soil: gravelly soil, loose, black soil, basalt deposits
- Lateritic soils: Lateritic gravelly soil, Lateritic soil
- Black soils: Deep black soil, Medium deep black soil, Shallow black soil
- Alluvio-Colluvial Soils: Non-saline, saline and sodic
- Forest soil: Brown forest soil
- Coastal soil:Coastal alluvial soil

== Water Resources ==
With a surface water potential of about 102 kilometers (63 mi), Karnataka accounts for about six percent of the country's surface water resources. Around 60% of this is provided by the west flowing rivers while the remaining comes from the east flowing rivers. There are seven river basins in all formed by the Godavari, Kaveri, Krishna, the west-flowing rivers, Penna, Ponniyar, and Palar.

=== Waterfalls in Karnataka ===
- Kalhatti Falls
- Anashi Falls
- Chakra River
- Vibhooti Falls
- Onake Abbi Falls
- Hanumangundi Falls
- Chelavara Falls
- Kadra Falls
- Gootlu Falls
- Hidlumane Falls
- Godchinamalaki Falls
- Abbey Falls
- Bandaje Falls
- Barkana Falls
- Chunchanakatte Falls
- Devaragundi Falls
- Gokak Falls
- Hebbe Falls
- Irupu Falls
- Jaladurga Falls
- Jog Falls
- Kalhatti Falls
- Kunchikal Falls
- Magod Falls
- Mallalli Falls
- Muthyalamaduvu Falls
- Sathodi Falls
- Shivanasamudra Falls
- Shivagange Falls
- Sirimane Falls
- Vajrapoha Falls
- Varapoha Falls
- Unchalli Falls
- Apsarakonda Falls

=== East flowing rivers ===
30 East-flowing rivers.

- Amarja
- Arkavathy River
- Agrani River
- Bhadra River
- Chakra River
- Dandavathi
- Doni River
- Ghataprabha River
- Hemavati River
- Hiranyakeshi River
- Honnuhole River
- Kabini River
- Kaveri River
- Kagina River
- Kedaka River
- Krishna River
- Kubja River
- Lakshmana Tirtha River
- Malaprabha River
- Palar River
- Panchagangavalli River
- Penner River
- Ponnaiyar River
- Shimsha
- South Pennar River
- Tunga River
- Tungabhadra River
- Varada
- Vedavathi River
- Vrishabhavathi River

=== West flowing rivers ===
12 West-flowing rivers, providing 60% of state's inland water resources.

- Gangavalli River
- Aghanashini River
- Kali River
- Kumaradhara River
- Mahadayi River
- Shambhavi River
- Varahi River
- Souparnika River
- Sharavathi River
- Netravati River
- Gurupura River
- Seetha river

=== Reservoirs ===
- Lal Bahadur Shastri Sagara, Alamatti.
- Basava Sagar Reservoir.
- Navilu theertha Reservoir.
- Ghataprabha Reservoir.
- Dhupdal Reservoir.
- Tungabhadra dam, Hosapete.
- Linganamakki.
- Bhadra Dam.
- Krishna Raja Sagara.
- Tippagondanahalli Reservoir.
- Harangi dam.
- Hemavathi Reservoir.
- Karanja Reservoir, Bidar.
- Kabini Reservoir(Kapila Jalashaya) H.D kote
- Suvarnavathi Reservoir

=== Lakes ===
- Lakes in Bengaluru
- Mysuru City lakes
- Shanthi Sagara, Davanagere
- Unkal lake, Hubballi
- Belagavi Fort Lake
- Heggeri Lake, Haveri
- Hagari Jalashaya, Malavi
- Sharanabasava Lake, Kalaburagi
- Sulekere lake, Davanagere

== Climate ==
Karnataka has the following four seasons in the year:

- The winter season from January to February
- The summer season from March to May
- The monsoon season from June to September
- The post-monsoon season from October to December.

The post-monsoon (period of retreating) and winter seasons are generally pleasant over the entire state. The months April and May are hot, very dry and generally uncomfortable. Weather tends to be oppressive during June due to high humidity and temperature. The next three months (July, August and September) are somewhat comfortable due to reduced day temperature although the humidity continue to be very high. The highest recorded temperature was 45.6 °C (114 °F) at Raichuru on 23 May 1928. The lowest recorded temperature was 2.8 °C (37 °F) C at Bidar on 16 December 1918.

Karnataka is divided into three meteorological zones:

- Coastal Karnataka: This zone comprises the districts of Uttara Kannada, Udupi and Dakshina Kannada. It is a region of heavy rainfall and receives an average rainfall of 3,638.5 mm (143.25 in) per annum. far in excess of rest of state.
- North Interior Karnataka: This zone comprises the districts of Belagavi, Bidar, Vijayapura, Bagalkote, Haveri, Gadaga, Dharwad, Kalaburagi, Koppala, Ballari, Raichuru, Yadagiri and Vijayanagara. This is an arid zone and receives only 711.5 mm (28.01 in) of average rainfall per annum.
- South Interior Karnataka: The rest of the districts of Bengaluru Urban, Bengaluru Rural, Ramanagara, Kolar, Chikkaballapura, Mandya, Mysuru, Chamarajanagara, Kodagu, Tumakuru, Hassana, Chitradurga, Davanagere, Chikkamagaluru and Shivamogga. This zone receives 1,064.8 mm (41.92 in) of average rainfall per annum.

== Rainfall ==
The southwest monsoon accounts for almost 80% of the rainfall that the state receives. The annual rainfall across the state ranges from low 50 cm (20 in) to copious 350 cm (140 in). The districts of Vijapura, Raichuru, Ballari, Yadagiri and Southern half of Kalaburagi experience the lowest rainfall ranging from 50 to 60 cm (24 in) while the west coastal region and Malenadu enjoy the highest rainfall.

The following were the top 5 places that peaked in rainfall statistics [2010-2017]

Rank	Hobli/Village	District	Taluk	Year	Rainfall in mm	Elevation in metres
1	Amagavi	Belagavi district	Khanapura	2010	10,068	785
2	Mundrote	Kodagu district	Madikeri	2011	9,974	585
3	Hulikal	Shivamogga district	Hosanagara	2013	9,383	614
4	Agumbe	Shivamogga district	Thirthahalli	2013	8,770	643
5	Kokalli/Kakalli	Uttara Kannada district	Sirsi	2014	8,746	780

== Forests ==
About 38724 km² (or 20% of Karnataka's geographic) are covered by forests. The forests are classified as reserved (28,611 km²) protected (3,932 km²), unclosed (5,748 km²), village (124 km²) and private (309 km²) forests. The percentage of forests area to Geographical area in the State is less than the all-India average of about 23%, and 33% prescribed in the National Forest Policy. The area under protected forests in the neighboring States is as follows: Andhra Pradesh 62,000 km² (9% of the total area of the country), Maharashtra 54,000 km² (8%), Tamil Nadu 22,000 km² (3%) and Kerala 11,000 km² (2%).

Karnataka is known for its valuable timbers from the evergreen forests in the Western Ghat region, notably Teak and Rosewood, the richly ornate panels of which adorn the beautiful chambers of the Two Houses of Karnataka Legislature.
