= Halady =

- Village
- Interactive map of Halady
- Country: India
- State: Karnataka

Languages
  - Official: Kannada
- Time zone: UTC+5:30 (IST)
- Telephone code: 08259
- Vehicle registration: KA-20
- Nearest city: Udupi
- Lok Sabha constituency: Udupi-Chikmagalur
- Climate: Tropical (Köppen)

Halady, also spelled Haladi, is a small village located in Kundapura Taluk, Udupi District, Karnataka, 22 km from Taluk Centre Kundapura. Halady village consists of Halady 76 and Halady 28, which are two portions of the village.

== Etymology ==
The name "Halady" derived from two Kannada words, hal and adi.

== History ==
Halady has history from pre-historic with Neolithic rock engravings in the nearby Gavali, Udupi village and villages like Avarse, Guddettu, Gavali, Udupi Nancharu, Sastavu near Petri etc. are included in the list of Mesolithic sites found in Udupi District Neolithic stone graves have also been discovered at Kakkunje, 3 km from Halady.. A stone epigraph, erected near the Mudoori Mahalingeswara Temple, located within the village limits of Halady, is dated to around 1600 CE. And added by famous Mahaganapathi Temple near Kolankal is almost everyone's visiting temple for all seasons which is just about a KM from Bidkalkatte main road. The Pre-primary, primary, high school and colleges are around Halady, which caters to the need to every rural student otherwise it used to be going until Kundapura or Udupi for college. The up gradation of Bidkalkatte high school to Junior college and Shankarnarayana Junior college upgraded to Degree college sometime back, where many meritorious students are being graduated.

== Geography and climate ==
Halady consists of patches of paddy fields and coconut garden imbedded in a hilly and forest terrain. This place receives heavy rain fall from June to October every year and climate is tropical.

=== Varahi River ===
The Varahi River, also called Halady river or Halady river, flows on the northern side of the village and is one of irrigation sources for river bank arecanut garden. This river, which is also called Halady river, joins the Arabian Sea near Kundapura after passing through Basrur, a historical village. Dasanakatte Hole coming from eastern side joins Varahi River near Halady and the flow in this river is greatly reduced after construction of the Mani Dam across the Varahi River, near Masthikatte.

== Demographics ==
The Halady village has population of 2792 of which 1314 are males, 1477 are females per Population Census 2011

== Economic activity ==
The main economic activity of the village is agriculture: rice, coconut, areca nuts, cashews and rubber are the major products. The Halady Tile Factory, which used to manufacture Mangalore Tiles during 20th Century, now mainly produces decorative tiles and bricks.

== Art and culture ==
One Yakshagana troupe named "Halady Mela" is established at Halady, which plays Yakshaga dance-drama of 6 – 8 hours duration (full night) from November to May every year, in various towns and villages of Udupi district and surrounding districts.

=== Ancient temples ===
Halady is surrounded by several ancient temples such as:

- Durgaparameswari Temple,
- LakshmiNarasimha Temple (with seven foot height statue)
- Mudoori Mahalingeswara Temple
- Marlu Chikku Daivastana etc.

The annual fair celebrated at Marlu Chikku Daivastana and Lakshminarasimha Temple attracts large number of people. Halady has a grama panchayat to look after the civic amenities of the village. Halady village has a nursing home near the bus station, with moderate medical facilities.

== Transportation ==
Halady is well connected by all-weather road to Kundapura, Udupi, Mangalore, Hebri, Agumbe, Shimoga and Bangalore by way of Public Bus Services.

== Contribution ==
- Prathap Chandra Shetty, Ex-MLA (from Haikady, 3 km)
- Halady Sreenivasa Shetty, MLA

Contribution to art, culture and literature include

- Naranappa Uppoor (late), Yakshagana Bhagavat.

== See also ==
- Kundapura Taluk
- Gavali, Udupi
