= Gangolli =

Gangolli Pancha Gangavali
- Town
- Location in Karnataka, India Gangolli (India)
- Coordinates: 13°39′13.7″N 74°39′59.0″E
- Country: India
- State: Karnataka
- District: Udupi
- Named for: Fishing, Port
- Elevation: 22.2 m (73 ft)

Population (2011)
  - Total: 13,014

Languages
  - Official: Kannada, Deccan Urdu, beary, Nawayathi, Konkani
- Time zone: UTC+5:30 (IST)
- PIN: 576216
- Telephone code: 08254
- Vehicle registration: KA-20

Gangolli (also Ganguli) is a town in Kundapur Taluk of Udupi district in Karnataka state. It is situated at the estuary of the Panchagangavalli River. It is located on a peninsula on the west coast of Karnataka. It is bordered by the river to the east and by the Arabian Sea to the west.

== Location ==
Gangolli is situated at the mouth of an estuary where 5 rivers, Souparnika River, Varahi River, Kedaka River, Chakra River, and Kubja River, together called "Panchagangavali" meet. The local Kannada versions of those river names are Kollooru hole, Haladi hole, Rajadi hole, Vandse hole and Hemmadi hole.

== History ==
As per the earliest recorded history of the region, Gangolli and the surrounding areas were ruled by the Alupa dynasty (or Aluvas), who were the indigenous rulers of the coastal region known as Alvakheda (modern Udupi and Dakshina Kannada) for over a thousand years from 200 to 1444 AD. Before the prominence of the Veerashaiva and GSB communities in the 16th century, the region was a major center for Jainism and Nathism.

Following the decline of the Alupas, the region came under the Vijayanagara Empire. During the turmoil in the Vijayanagar Empire following its defeat at the Battle of Tallikota in 1565, Gangolli came under the rule of the Nayakas of Keladi from Keladi who until then were chieftains (Nayakas) of Vijayanagara but seized the opportunity to break away and declare independence as the Bednore Kingdom. The population and activity around Gangolli at the time was scanty as most of the surrounding area continued to be densely forested. The people living in and around Gangolli were predominantly Veerashaivas, Jains and their occupations being agriculture and fishing. Basrur, further inland from Gangolli was a more prominent place being mentioned even in the writings of 13th century traveller Ibn Battuta.

Around 1560, because of the Goa Inquisition, a large number of Goan families migrated to Gangolli and further south. These despondent refugees purchased large portions of land from individual residents and also directly from the Keladi king Sadashiva Nayaka under whose patronage they cleared forested areas to accommodate themselves. The prominent among the newly formed institutions then was the Venkataramana temple which is popularly known as Malyar Matt of Gaud Saraswat Brahmins (GSB) which undoubtedly facilitated the development of the locality. Their pioneering contribution to the development of the region was quick in coming as they resumed their old trade now from a new base in Gangolli and Basrur (referred to then as Barcelor) making Gangolli into an important maritime location at the time.

The patronage provided by the Keladi Nayakas to the immigrants was not appreciated by the over-zealous Goa Inquisition focused Portuguese administration in Goa at the time. However, in and around Gangolli the relationship and inter-dependence between the local rulers and their new enterprising subjects was deepening by the day especially after the Keladi Nayaks staked claim to independence in 1565. Many of the gun wielding, horse trading/riding men joined as mercenaries to fight alongside Keladi armies, offered services on trading & tax collecting ships or trained the armies of the Keladi Nayaks on the use of firearms and open-sea warfare.

It is believed that the first church in South Kanara came up on the Gangolli Bunder around 1560 which was in effect just a prayer hall without a tabernacle as there was no priest around there at the time.

Aware of Gangolli's rapid development in recent times, during the reign of Virabhadra Nayaka (1629–1645) the Portuguese captured Gangolli in 1629 under the command of Miguel de Noronha, 4th Count of Linhares. He built a fort at the mouth of the estuary in Gangolli and dedicated it to St. Michael (Michael (archangel)). He also commissioned the building of a small church dedicated to the Immaculate Conception. The church was destroyed when the Portuguese had to leave Gangolli in 1757, but was rebuilt and rededicated in May 2017.

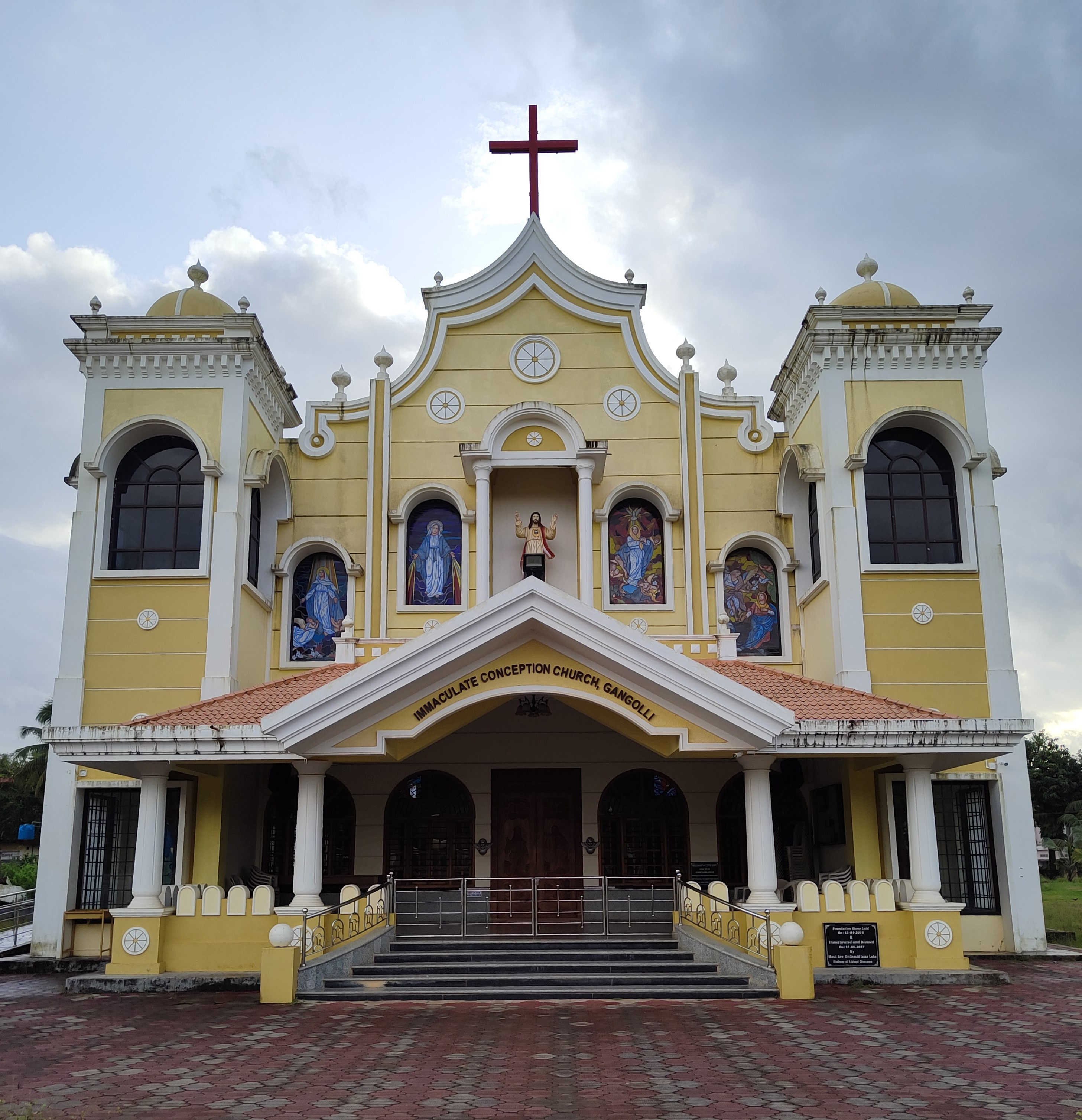
Immaculate Conception Church

Shivappa Nayaka ascended the throne in 1645 after Virabhadra. He ran several campaigns to regain territories lost over the years. By the year 1654 he managed to push the Portuguese back and reclaim now a fortified Gangolli and Honnavar then also called Onore. Shivappa's 15-year reign came to an abrupt end in 1660. In the following 12 years, 3 rulers came and went as the dynasty began to crumble - Chikka Venkatappa Nayaka (1660–1662), Bhadrappa Nayaka (1662–1664) & Somashekara Nayaka I (1664–1672).

Under the Vijayanagar rulers, Gangolli had been a transit town for ships going further inland to Basrur. Trade was primarily with the Portuguese and the Arabs of Muscat. Horses, dates came inland in exchange for rice, pepper and kitchen vessels primarily of copper. By 1680 Gangolli had lost out to Mangalore as a preferred trading port due to the fact that even large seafaring vessels could go into the broad and up to 17-fathom-deep Netravati River and load rice. During the British administration, Gangolli grew into an important commerce and export centre with business connections to Bombay, Kerala, Gujarat, the Middle East, Lakshadweep and Tanzania. The main exports were Rice, jaggery and coconut.

Muscat was traditionally one of the main Arab ports trading with the entire west coast of India. A Muscat port log of 1672 reveals that Muscat has 16 ships that came in from Sind, 4 from the Malabar, 4 from the Makran Coast, 1 from Karwar, 2 from Patan, 2 from Pate, 14 from Konkani Ports, 2 from Mocha, 2 from Surat & Broach, 2 from Maldives, 16 from Kung and the highest - 27 from Bhatkal, Barcelor (Basrur via Gangolli) & Mangalore.

On one occasion in 1697 however, a fleet of Arabs from Muscat went on a rampage damaging temples and sacking areas from Gangolli, Kundapur to Basrur when they were refused royal permission to set up a factory there.

After Indian independence in 1948, the village continued to be a trading centre, but dependency on the sea reduced due to the construction of National Highway 17 (India) or NH-17 (recently renumbered as NH-66) and the introduction of modern transport systems.

Fr Paul D.G. Rego started the Labour School on 1 October 1949. Fr Michael Noronha constructed St Joseph Primary and Stella Maris Girls’ High School. Fr Thomas D’Sa constructed the new school building at Kannada Kudru. Fr Felix Noronha did the renovation of the school building in December 2001. A new school building was constructed and computer education was started at the elementary school.

From the 1980s it developed as a major fishing centre with the introduction of mechanised fishing. It has now become the second largest bunder in Karnataka. Presently more than 200 boats are moored here.

== Economy ==
Gangolli village has a harbour, and fishing is a major economic activity of Gangolli, as in the rest of Udupi district.

== Language ==
The main languages used here are Kannada, Urdu, Nawayath, Beary and Konkani.
