= Pamenahalli =

Village in Karnataka, India

Coordinates: 14°25′N 75°57′E

Pamenahalli is a village in Harihara Taluk, Karnataka, India.

The total geographical area of the village is 151.66 ha (1,516,600 m^{2}). It is located 17 km (11 mi) west of Davenagere, 298 km (185 mi) from Bangalore, 9 km (5.6 mi) from Harihar.

In 2009, Sarati was the gram panchayat of Pamenahalli village. The total geographical area of village is 151.66 hectares. Pamenahalli has a total population of 672, living in 129 houses. It contains a school which provides primary and middle schooling, and a post office. The most commonly spoke language is that of the Kannada people.

== Nearby settlements ==
Pamenahalli is surrounded by Ranebennur Taluk towards North, Davanagere Taluk towards East, Honnali Taluk towards South, Hirekerur Taluk towards west. Davanagere, Ranibennur, Shikapur, Shimoga are the nearby Cities to Pamenahalli. This Place is in the border of the Davangere District and Haveri District. Haveri District, Ranebennur is North towards this place.

== Transport ==
The nearest railway access is at Harihar railway station. 14°35'35.7"N 75°48'56.9"E are the geographical coordinates of the village
