= Masthikatte =

- Village
- Location in Karnataka, India
- Coordinates: 13°44′14″N 75°01′40″E
- Country: India
- State: Karnataka
- District: Shimoga

Languages
  - Official: Kannada
- Time zone: UTC+5:30 (IST)
- PIN: 577425

Masthikatte is a village located in Hosanagara Taluk, Shimoga district, Karnataka, India.pincode 577425

== Etymology ==
In local tradition, Masthikatte means "a place where woman (may be widow) sacrifised herself" or a place where suttee or Sati was practiced. Masthi means "Maha Sati" or revered lady. There is a spot near three road junction which is identified as "Masthikatte".

== Activity ==
Masthikatte came into existence in the 1980s when the Karnataka Power Corporation built a township for its employees working on the Varahi Hydroelectric Project. It can be called a gated community, surrounded by the thick forests of the Western Ghats. The town has a number of amenities, including a post office, bank, and medical facilities which were all provided by the Karnataka Power Corporation.

== Transportation ==
Masthikatte is well connected to the towns of Shimoga, Hosanagara, Thirthahalli, Kundapura, Udupi and Mangalore on the State Highway.

== Rainfall ==
Masthikatte receives heavy rainfall and receives equal amount or more rainfall (in some seasons) than Agumbe, which has record of heaviest rain fall in Karnataka.

== Flora and fauna ==
As the village is located in the midst of dense forests belonging to Western Ghats, a World Heritage Site, variety of flora and fauna occur around Masthikatte.

== Places of interest ==
=== Varahi Backwaters ===
Backwaters of the Varahi River dam exist in the low-lying areas some 3 kilometers away, near the village of Hulikal

=== Kunchikal Falls ===
The Kunchikal Falls in the Western Ghats area, created by Varahi River, are located 5 Kilometers away from Masthikatte. At 1,493 feet,(455 metres) the falls are dubbed as Highest in India. Damming at Mani for the Hydroelectric plant has greatly reduced the flow of the waterfalls, however.

=== Chandikamba Temple, Hulikal ===
Deep inside the forest, on state highway, small temple complex belonging to Chandikamba Temple is located at a distance of 5 km from Masthikatte.

== See also ==
- Kunchikal Falls
- Varahi River
- Agumbe
