= Kattinakere =

Kattinakere (ಕಟ್ಟಿನಕೆರೆ) also called B Sagadde is a hamlet in Soraba Tq, Karnataka state, India. This is one of settlements of the ancient Kuntala country with an ancient temple and some ruins nearby. The village is adjecent to Sagadde and Bhavyapura two ancient settlements with much larger temples and ruins. The village is named after a tank near the village which is about 19 acres in area, probably built by Keladi or Vijayanagara kings. This village reservoir is fed by rainwater from nearby mountains. The water in the reservoir and its channels flow on and gather more water along the way to become the river Dandavathi. Kattinakere has a population of around 35 who are mainly agriculturists. The Hindu brahmins living here are descendants of Ahichatra Brahmins brought by Mayura Sharma to teach and perform Vedas. Not so far from this place live people who immigrated from coastal areas of Karnataka South of the Sahyadri Mountains. Their settlement is called Hullihakkalu or Muttipura.

== The village legend ==
Legend has it that at one time, a wealthy landlord, a follower of the Lingayata sect, lived in this village. He had a wife who lost a lot of his wealth in a gambling contest. Dejected, the landlord left the place, which was later settled by a few Havyaka Brahmins. The word Kattinakere means `the reservoir of the bund`. The official maps are not up to date and according to records the village is called B Sagadde and the official village boundary lay west of the actual village beyond the reservoir catchment area. It is said that there was a settlement west of the reservoir and which was called Kattinakere. There are some remains of an old settlement there. It is uncertain when the settlement moved to the current location of the village. The name, however, has remained.

== Temple ruins ==
Some ruins such as a tiger bust, Nandi (Bull God) and other remains of temples can be seen to the west of the village. About 2 km from this place there are ruins of a Shiva temple in the village of Sagadde. The villagers believe that these ruins are of a temple that has now become the Madhukeshwara temple, the only temple in the village. The villagers worship 8 other demigods (Huliyappa, Konanatale Bootappa etc.) during Deepavali and are believed to protect the village. These demigods are worshiped during the Deepavali festival every year.

== The people tree ==
The village has a prominent people tree held sacred by the villagers. This tree is about 30 metres (98 ft) tall, has wide branches and is very old. There is a Serpent statue near it which along with the tree is worshiped once a year by every family in the village on Naga Panchami day.

== Origin of river Dhandavathi ==
Dhandavathi is a tributary of the river Varada. Varada in turn joins the Tungabhadra River and later the Krishna River which finally joins the Bay of Bengal on the East coast of India. The village has a 19 acre water reservoir. The reservoir's overflow canal turns into a creek gathering strength on its way to become the river Dandavathi.

== Notable animals ==
The villagers breed cattle. They usually are named are called by that name. Tigers wandering in nearby hills once attacked Kaali grazing along with other cattle. Kaali, a seemingly weak cow that had a twisted hanging horn escaped the attack. The exact circumstances are not known but she had part of her back torn off which healed, but she survived. A calm but very strong animal later escaped a cattle center jumping a wall about 6 feet high. The cow was given away as a gift to a nearby villager but would always visit Kattinakere frequently which forced farmers to send it to a cattle center.

Another animal fondly remembered by villagers is a dog. He always accompanied villagers walking to a bus terminal 2 km away. He would wait and return only after the bus had left. He would also go to the bus terminal by himself to pick up and accompany people who he knew would come at a regular time.

== Reservoir ==
There is a large water reservoir that serves as storage for irrigation during summer. The catchment area is significant and with deforestation, there is more water flow to the reservoir. The reservoir has not been cleaned in a long time. During heavy monsoon rains, the canals and reservoir come close to overflowing. There is a stone carved reservoir deity on the bund which is rarely worshiped.
