= Kedaka River =

River in India

The Kedaka River (also Kheta River, Khedda River or Rajadi Hole) is a river flowing through the towns of Kundapur and Gangolli in Udupi district, located in Karnataka state in western India.

It joins with the Souparnika River, Varahi River, Chakra River, and Kubja River which merge into the Arabian Sea at Gangolli. The confluence of the five rivers is known as the Panchagangavali.
