= Panchagangavalli River =

River in India

Coordinates: 13°38′4.11″N 74°40′9.97″E

Panchagangavalli River is a river flowing through Kundapur and Gangolli in western India. The five rivers namely Souparnika River, Varahi River, Kedaka River, Chakra River and Kubja River join and merge into Arabian Sea.
