= Kodi, India =

Kodi
- village
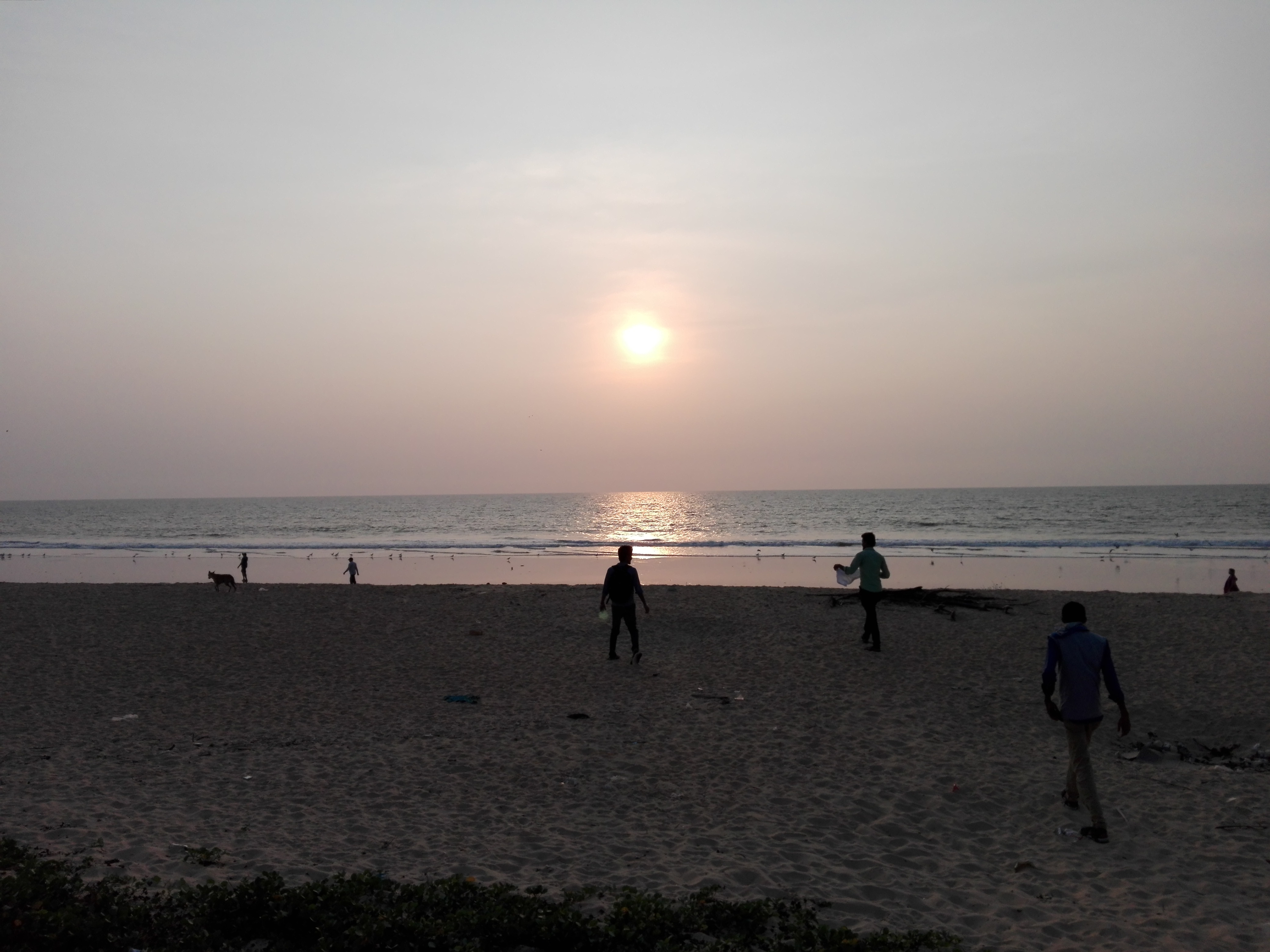
- Kodi beach
- Country: India
- State: Karnataka

Government
  - Body: Gram panchayat

Languages
  - Official: Kannada
- Time zone: UTC+5:30 (IST)
- PIN: 576254
- ISO 3166 code: IN-KA
- Vehicle registration: KA
- Website: karnataka.gov.in

Kodi is a village in Kundapura taluk, Udupi district of Karnataka state in India. It is located on the Arabian Sea coast.

Kodi is known for its beach and the one-kilometer sea walk where dolphins can be spotted.

== See also ==
- Delta Beach
