= Kunchikal Falls =

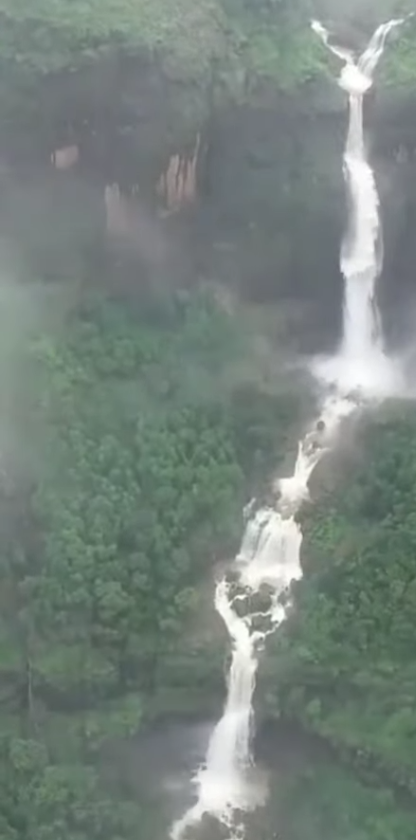
- Interactive map of Kunchikal Falls
- Location: Nidagodu village, near Masthikatte, Shimoga district, Karnataka
- Coordinates: 13°41′41″N 75°01′05″E
- Type: Tiered
- Total height: 1493 ft (455m)
- Number of drops: 4
- Watercourse: Varahi River

Kunchikal Falls is a waterfall in India located in the Nidagodu village near Yadur-Masthikatte in the Shimoga district of Karnataka state. The waterfall cascades down rocky boulders and the total height of the falls is 183 meters (600 feet), according to the World Waterfall Database. Kunchikal Falls is formed by the Varahi River.

After the construction of the Mani Dam near Sulagodu and an underground power generation station near Hosangadi, Udupi district, the water flow to the falls has greatly reduced and is visible only during the rainy season (July-Sept). As the falls are within a restricted area, a gate pass is required to visit. The nearest airport is at Mangalore, 138 km (86 mi) from the waterfall.

== See also ==
- List of waterfalls
- List of waterfalls in India
- List of waterfalls in India by height
- Varahi River
