= Chunchanakatte Falls =

Waterfall in Karnataka, India

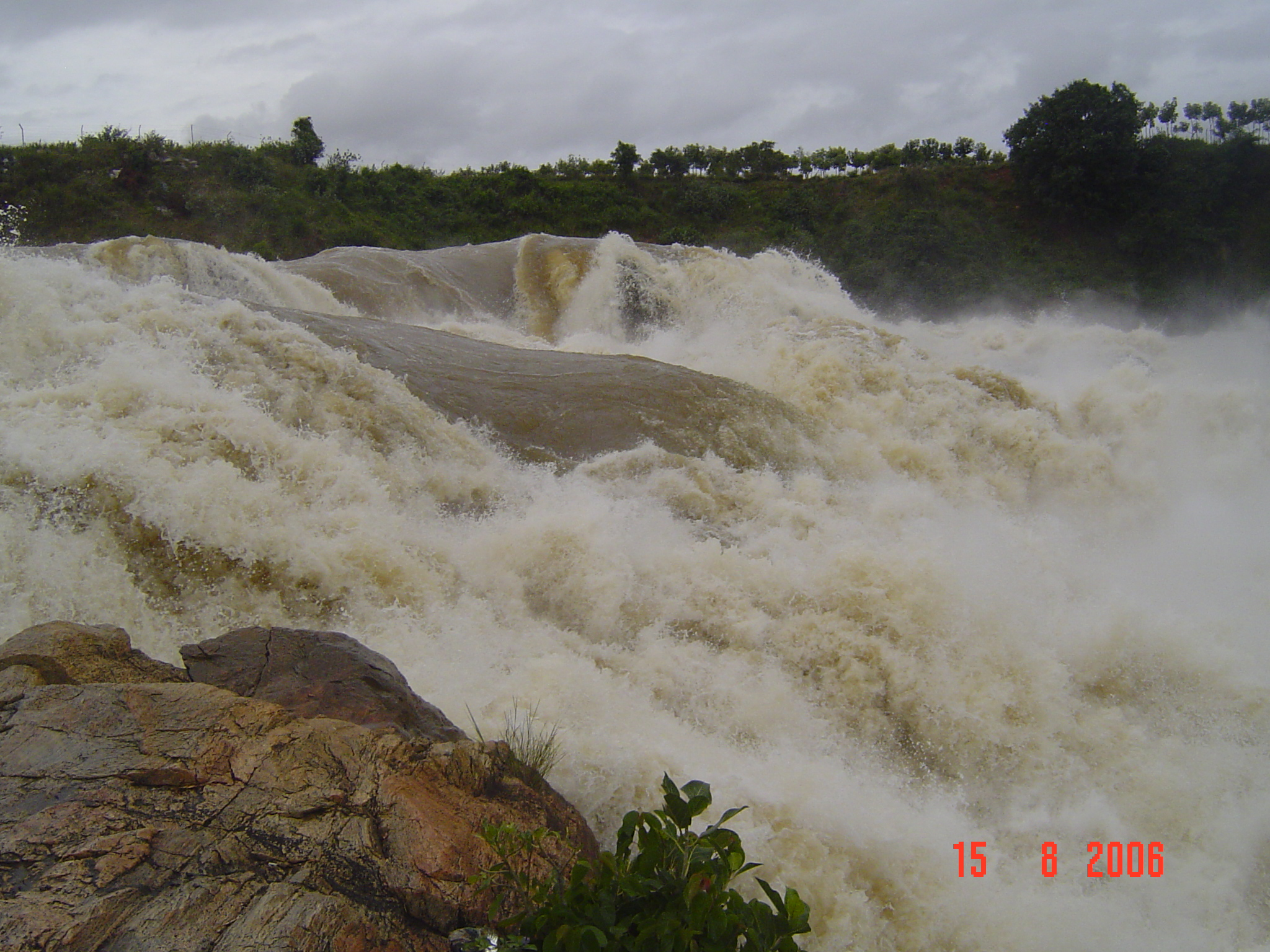
Chunchanakatte Falls

Chunchanakatte Falls is a waterfall on the Kaveri River, near the village of Chunchanakatte in saligrama taluk of Mysore district, Karnataka, India. Water cascades from a height of about 20 meters. It is in the Western Ghats. Here the river falls in two small cascades before joining again to flow as one.

== Location ==
The waterfall can be reached by taking a diversion at Krishnarajanagar on the Mysore-Hassan highway. The diversion is on the left at the circle in the town of KR Nagar which joins the KR Nagar- Holenarasipura road (SH 108) through Saligrama. A subsequent right turn at chunchanakatte village leads to the waterfall. It is located at approximately 7 k.m from taluk headquarters Saligrama and 14 km from the town of KR Nagar.

Chunchanakatte is the holy place where Lord Sri Rama during his vanvas stopped by and availed the hospitality of a tribal couple called Chuncha and Chunchi. The significance of this place is that the sound of the powerful falls can be heard all over except inside the sanctum sanctorum of the centuries-old temple, the story goes that Lord Rama was tired of the constant complaining of Sita Mata and gave a curse saying that the tongue of a woman should not be sharp and since Cauvery (river) is considered to be female the noise that the river generated would not be heard in the sanctum sanctorum of the lord. It is also said that when Sita Mata was tired and weary and wanted to have a bath, Lord Ram directed Lakshman to fire an arrow at a rock, once Lakshmana fired the arrow, water in 3 different shades started pouring out, one with turmeric, one with oil and one with shikakai (fruit for hair - natural shampoo). These shades are visible even today when there is considerable amount of water flowing in the falls. Before the powerplant was established, this place was like paradise on earth with nature at its best.

There is an epic that Goddess Sitha matha was bathing in the waterfalls. Hence, is also called Sithamaduvu.

=== Distances and importance ===
It is situated in Mysore District at a distance of 56 km from Mysore, 14 km from K.R.Nagar and 7 km from taluk headquarter Saligrama . It is well connected by road. Buses ply between Mysore and Chunchanakatte. The place is not known for any amenities but one can find bakeries and small eateries and hotels at K.R.Nagar.

Is very famous for sugar and also paddy. Chunchanakatte is surrounded by the Cauvery river, which goes to KRS dam reservoir. It is also a holy place for many Hindus, where they have Lord Sree Kodanda Rama who on the way to Lanka stopped here.

This locale has been used in a lot of Kannada movies and has been a haunt for many of the film stars and politicians, most famous being Rajkumar. This region is mainly inhabited by farmers and employees of a local sugar mill and of late the power generation plant.

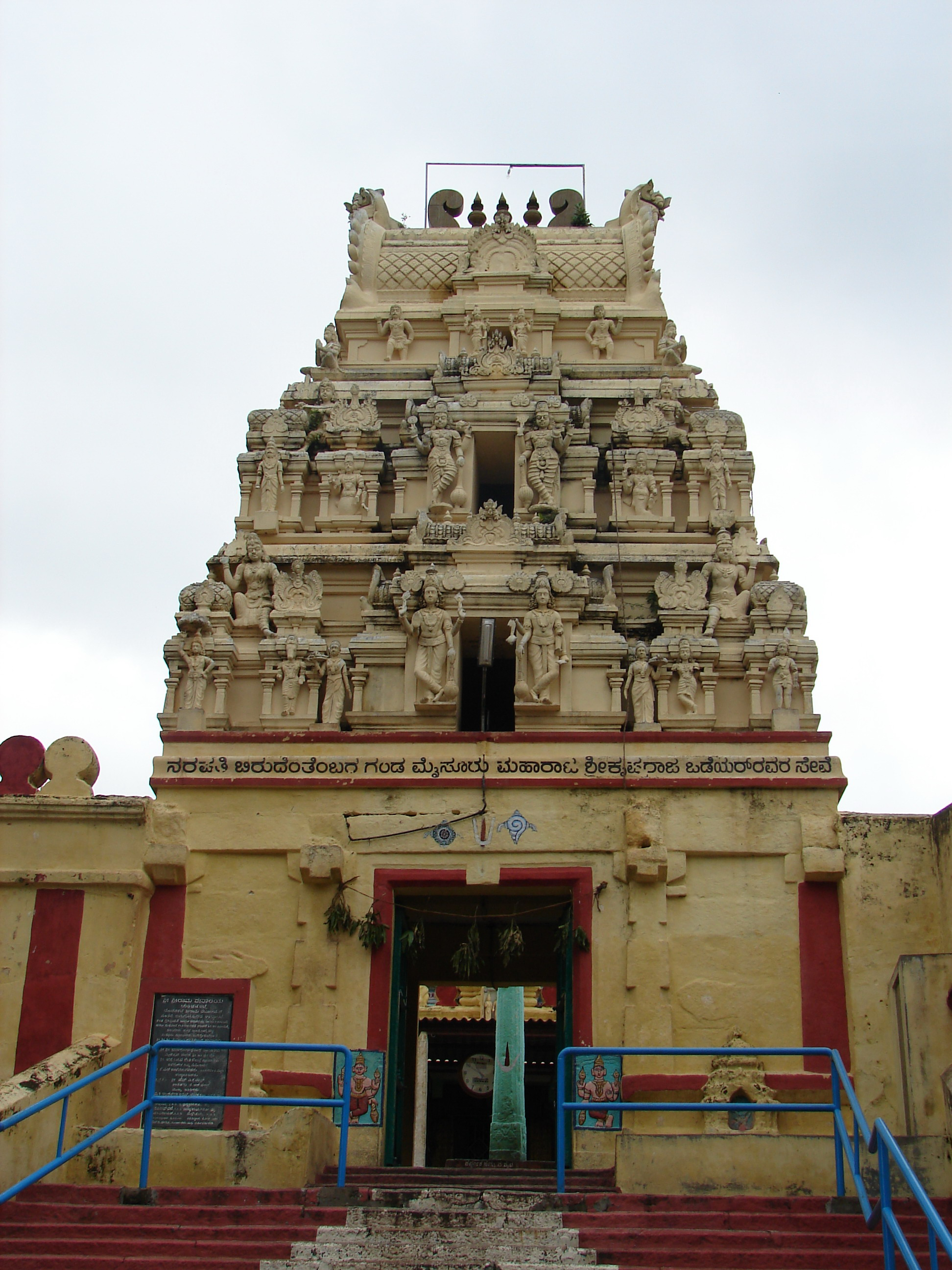
Kodanda Rama temple at Chunchankatte Falls

== Kodandarama Temple ==
There is an ancient temple built here dedicated to Lord Kodandarama. The uniqueness of the idol installed here is that Sita is standing to the right side of Sri Rama instead of the usual left. Legend describes that Lord Rama during his tenure in the forests stayed in this place on the behest of the tribal couple Chuncha and Chunchi. It seems during that time there was not a drop of water here, and when Rama's wife Sita wanted to have a bath, Rama instructed his brother Lakmana to facilitate Sita Devi's wish. Lakmana shot an arrow on the rocks and water started gushing out in plenty and Sita Devi could take her bath. Also in this forest Lord Rama met Agnatha Rishi (Unknown Sage) and was impressed by his devotion to lord Narayana, so Rama asked the Rishi to ask for a boon and the Rishi asked Lord Rama that he desired to see Lord Rama with Sita on his right side. The boon was granted and so was the idol installed in the same manner. There are two Hanuman temples, one at the entrance to the temple and the other after the temple near the river.

The most astonishing feature of this temple is that even though the falls beside the temple makes a deafening noise, inside the garbhagudi (Sanctum sanctorum) nothing of the roar can be heard. It is as though the falls does not exist. The legend narrated for this phenomenon goes like this – it seems Lord Rama was tired of Sita Devi's constant complaining so he cursed that women should not talk unnecessarily and add to the noise pollution. Even though women till now do not seem to have been touched by the curse, river Cauvery's (who is considered a woman) roar at least is not heard in the garbhagudi of the temple.

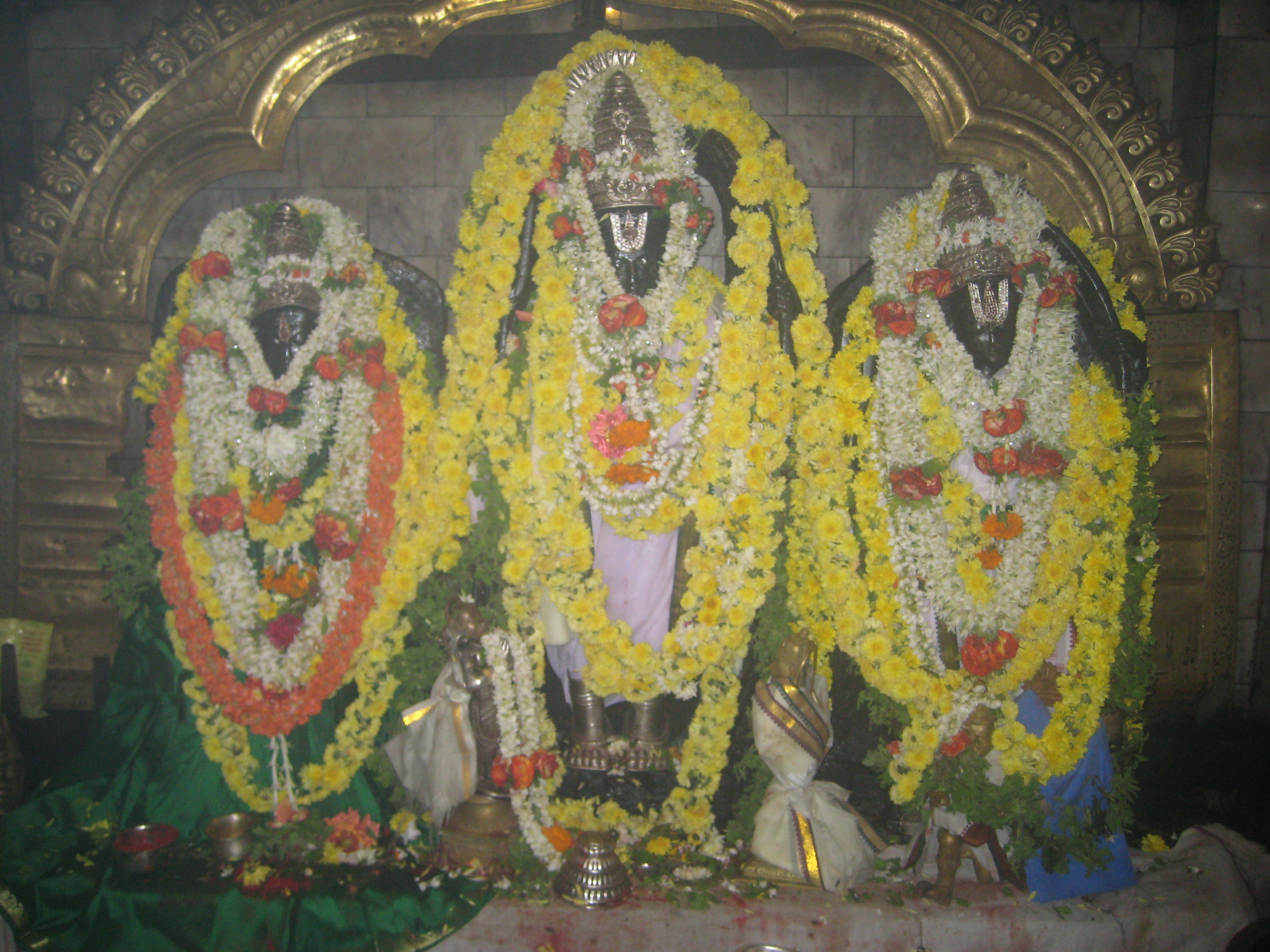
Chunchanakatte Kodanda Rama

== Chunchankatte Falls ==
Cauvery flows into Chunchankatte roaring thunderously forming a 60 feet height and approximately 300 to 400 feet wide waterfalls. This place is situated 57 km from Mysore in saligrama taluk, Mysore district. When the river reaches to cascade it is divided into two separate falls and joins again to continue to flow as one into Krishna Raja Sagar (KRS) dam. The roar is deafening and the spray from the falls is refreshing. The gushing of water from every nook and corner of the rocky bed forms a milky white falls and the brown colored water in some parts of the falls shows the fertility that Cauvery brings along with her to the deccan plateau. At one angle you can see a large quantity of water whoosh to about 10 feet away from the jutting rocky bed before cascading into the river displaying the force at which it flows. This force is well tapped here and there is a hydraulic power generating station installed. It is in its best form during monsoon, but during seasons where there is less inflow of water, you can climb onto the rocks and explore more. From Mysore, drive down Mysore-Hassan highway and reach K.R.Nagar. Here, any of the locals can guide you to the falls. It is approximately 7 kilometers from saligrama.and 15 kilometers from K.R.Nagar. The falls is unsafe as water flow increases suddenly when water is released from KRS dam.

== Important events ==
Brahma Ratotsava (car festival) is held on the day of Makara shankranthi every year. This day falls in January. The cattle festival, which is one of the biggest in this region, is held during January first week.

Many water and shore birds can be spotted here. Good place to picnic.

== See also ==
- List of waterfalls
- List of waterfalls in India
