= Kalhattigiri Falls =

Waterfall in Karnataka, India

Coordinates: 13°33′N 75°45′E

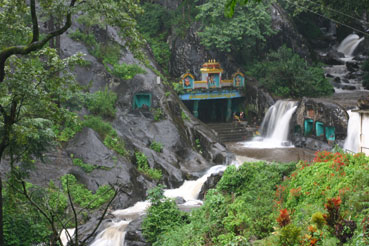
Kalhattagiri Falls / ಕಲ್ಹತ್ತಿ ಜಲಪಾತ

Location of Kalhatti Falls in Karnataka

Kalhatti Falls or Kalhattigiri Falls is a waterfall on the headwaters of the river, located at Kallathigiri, Tarikere Taluk in Chikmagalur district of Karnataka. The waterfall is 10 kilometers (6.2 mi) away from Kemmangundi hill station.

== Location ==
Kalhatti Falls is located 45 metres from Tarikere (Tarikere Taluk in Chikmagalur District). It belongs Tarikere taluk of chikkamagalur district.

== See also ==
- List of waterfalls
- List of waterfalls in India
