= Religion in Karnataka =

Religion in Karnataka (2011)
1. Hinduism (84.0%)
2. Islam (12.9%)
3. Christianity (1.87%)
4. Jainism (0.72%)
5. Buddhism (0.16%)
6. Sikhism (0.05%)
7. Other (0.02%)
8. Not religious (0.27%)

Religion in Karnataka has played a very important role in shaping modern Indian religions and philosophy. Hinduism is the majority religion in Karnataka adhered by around 84% of the state's population, with Islam (12.92%) being the second largest religion and followed by Christianity, Jainism and Buddhism.

== Hinduism ==
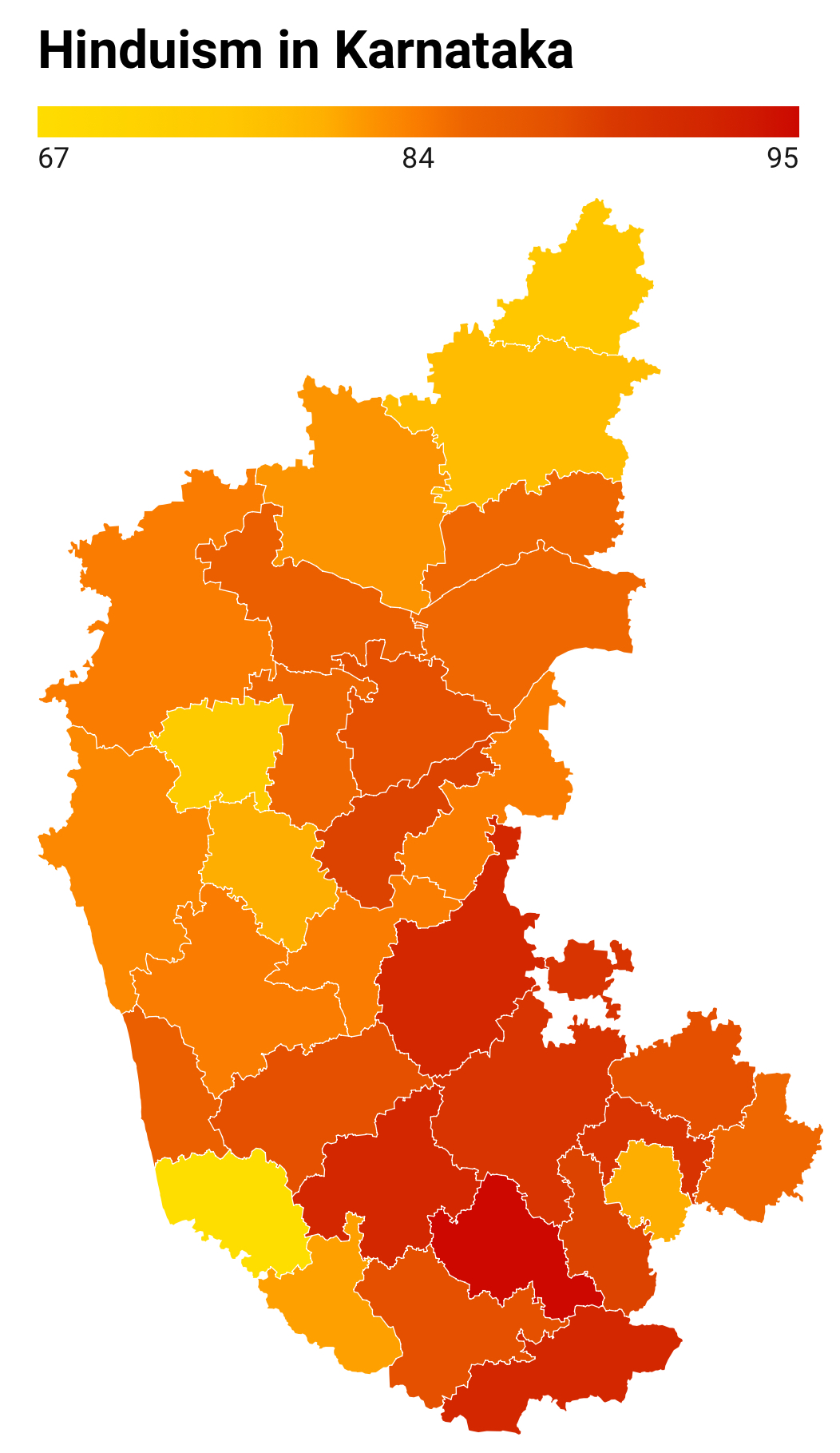
Hinduism percent in Karnataka by district, 2011 census

The three most important schools of Vedanta Hinduism, Advaita Vedanta, Vishishtadvaita and Dvaita, blossomed in Karnataka. The Dvaita Madhvacharya was born in Karnataka. The Advaita Adi Shankara chose Shringeri in Karnataka to establish the first of his four mathas. The Vishishtadvaita Ramanuja, considered a saint in Sri Sampradaya, who fled persecution by the Shaiva Chola dynasty of Tamil Nadu, spent from 1098 to 1122 in Karnataka. He first lived in Tondanur and then moved to Melukote where the Cheluvanarayana Swamy Temple and a well-organised matha were built. He was patronized by Hoysala Vishnuvardhana. Udupi, Shringeri, Gokarna and Melukote are well known places of Sanskrit and Vedic learning.

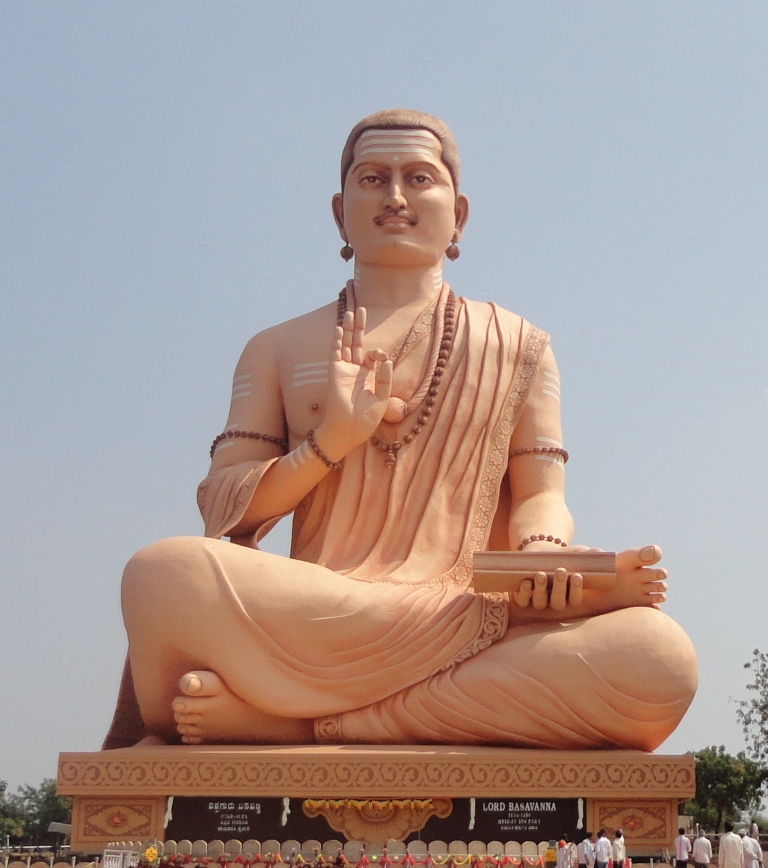
Basavanna flourished Lingayatism in Karnataka.

In the 12th century, social reforms emerged in northern Karnataka as a protest against the rigidity of the prevailing social and caste system. Leading figures of the movement such as Basava, Akka Mahadevi and Allama Prabhu established the Anubhava Mantapa where Lingayatism was expounded. Nearly 29% population of Karnataka belongs to Lingayat sect.

== Culture ==
Karnataka played a very important role in shaping present day Indian religion and philosophy. Udupi, Sringeri, Gokarna and Melukote are well known places of Sanskrit learning and Vedic learning. Shravanabelagola, Mudabidri, Karkala are famous for Jain history and monuments.

The great saint Madhvacharya (1238-1317 AD), proponent of dvaita philosophy and Raghavendra Swami were born here. Adi Sankara, proponent of advaita found enlightenment in Sringeri which became the first of four mathas he established in India. Fearing persecution from the Tamil CholasRamanujacharya fled Tamil Nadu and came to Karnataka during the rule of the Hoysala dynasty and preached his philosophy from Melukote. In the 12th century AD, Virashaivism spread from northern Karnataka across the Deccan. Many of its founders, such as Basavanna, Akka Mahadevi came from the region. It was here the Jain religion got a warm welcome and enjoyed a glorious growth during the medieval period. It is also here where the current day Dzogchen Monastery and the Dhondeling Tibetan Refugee camps are set up and the Tibetans are very well absorbed in the Kannadiga culture.

=== Temples ===
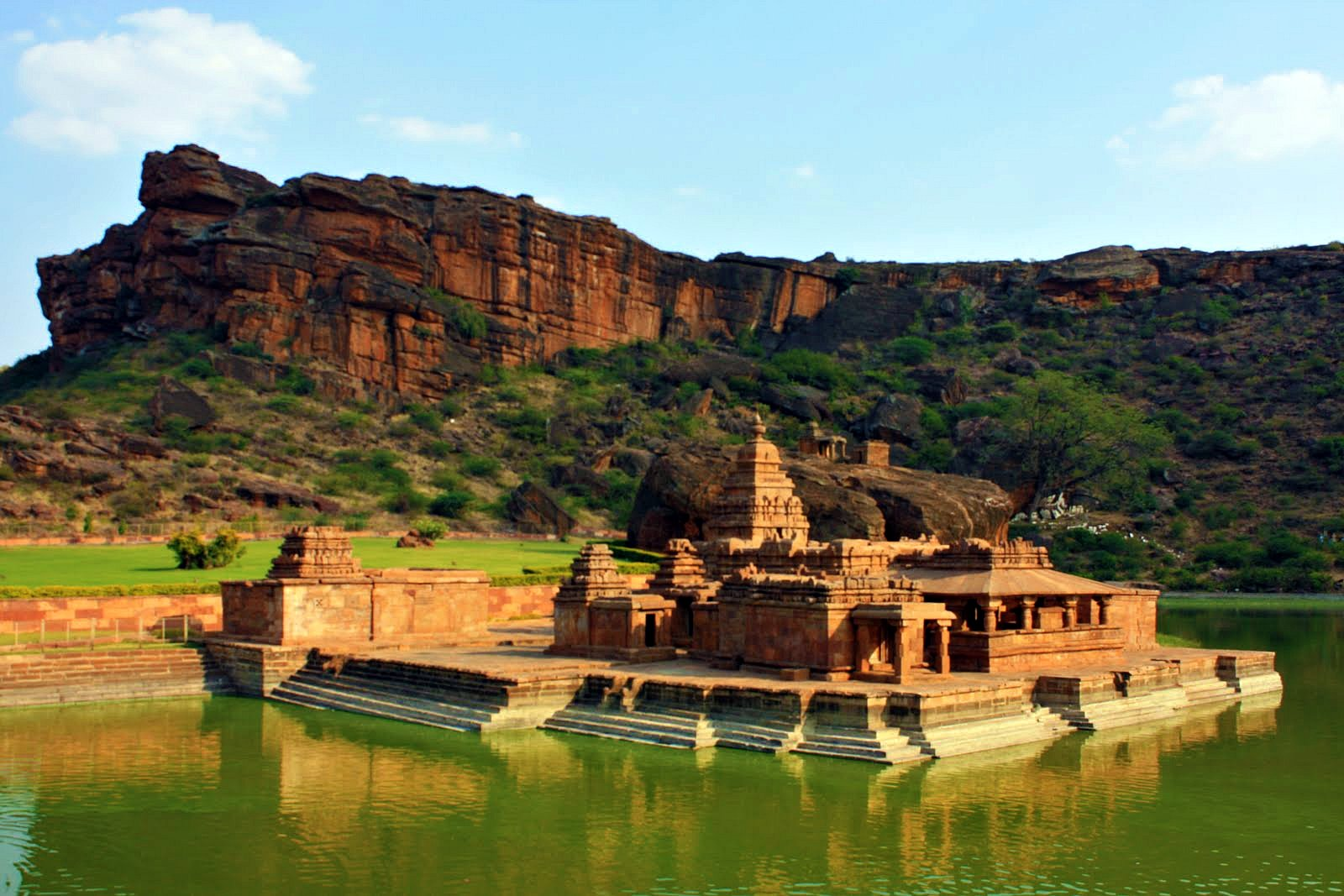
Bhutanatha temple complex, at Badami

The Empires and Kingdoms that came to rule from Karnataka were prolific builders. The Badami Chalukyas spawned the Vesara style of architecture and experimented with several myriad styles with frequent intermixing of Nagara and Dravida concepts. This period is the beginning of Hindu rock cut architecture, both in stand alone and cave temple idioms, numerous examples of which exist in Pattadakal, Aihole and Badami - (Badami Cave Temples). Their successors, the Rashtrakuta created master piece temples further favoring Dravidian concepts. Most of their temples in Karnataka are scattered over northern Karnataka districts. The Ganga Dynasty of Talakad built many Jaina monuments including the monolithic statue of Gomateshwara at Shravanabelagola. The Western Chalukyas used the In-between style, implying a bridge between Chalukya - Rashtrakuta and Hoysala styles, with the best temples of their style located in the central districts of Gadag district(Lakkundi, Dambal, Sudi, Lakshmeshwar, Gadag), Koppal district(Mahadeva Temple (Itagi), Kuknur), Haveri district (Galaganatha, Chaudayyadanapura, Haveri, Harlahalli, Hangal) and Dharwad District (Annigeri, Kundgol, Tamboor, Chandramouleshwara Temple Unakal Hubli). It was during the reign of the Hoysalas that the temple architecture reached its epoch and gained recognition as an independent style called (Henry Ferguson, Percy Brown) owing to its many unique features. Later the Vijayanagar Empire would incorporate all these various styles and create a unique blend called Vijayanagar style, the best examples of which are in the vast open air theater of monuments at Hampi.

== Islam ==
Islam, which had an early presence in the west coast of India as early as the 10th century gained a foothold in Karnataka with the arrival of the Bahmani Sultanate and Adil Shahi dynasty, which ruled parts of Karnataka.

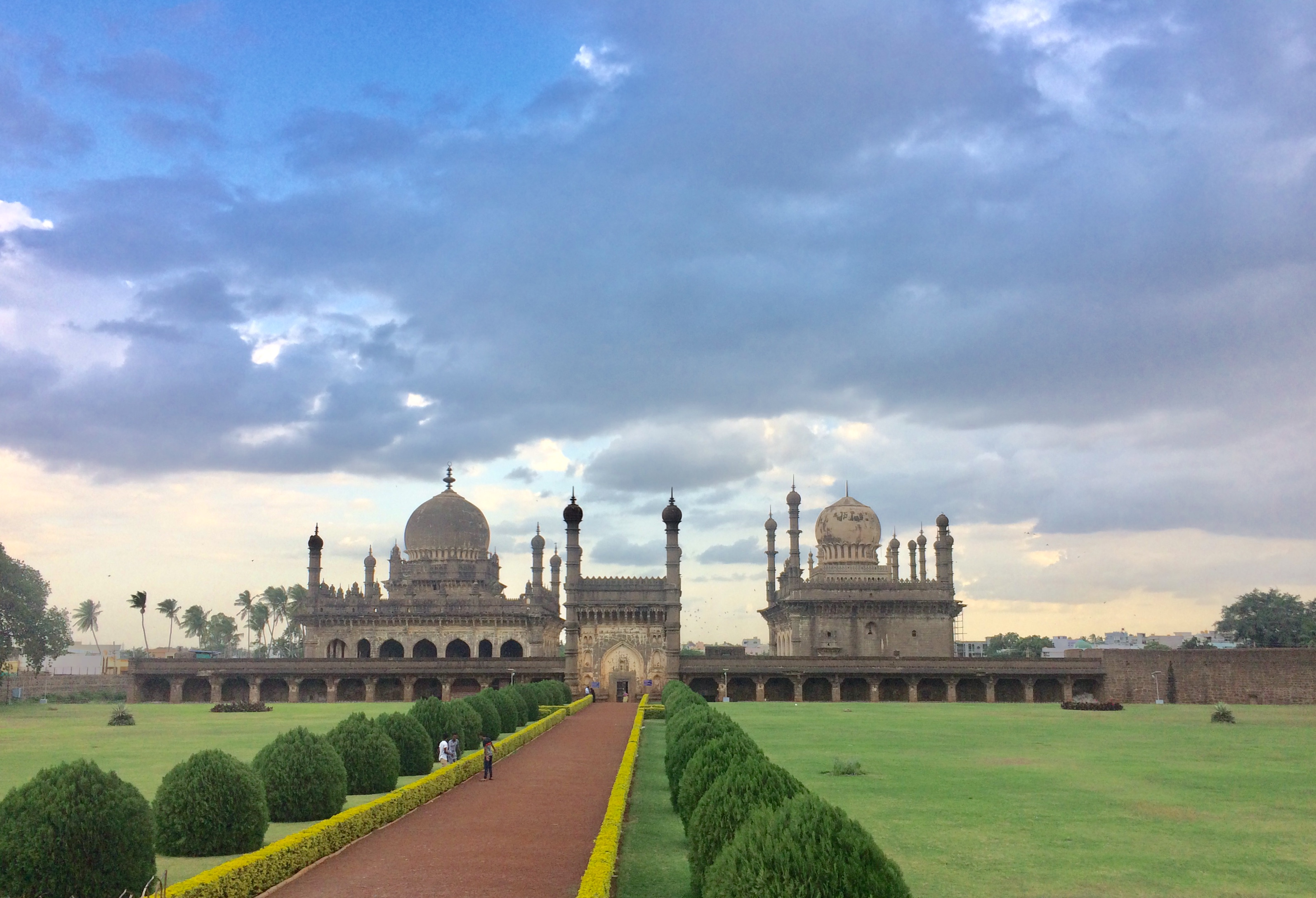
Ibrahim Roza monuments, 17th century.

Islam arrived in Karnataka and Kerala in the 7th century with Arab merchants trading in spices. Muslims introduced coffee, and the paper industry to the local economy. Following the 12th century, various Islamic armies established sultanates in this area such as the Bahamani sultanate of Bidar (1347–1510) and the Adilshahi dynasty of the Bijapur Sultanate (1490–1686). This land came under Mughal rule in the 17th century under Aurangzeb's rule. With the disintegration of Mughal rule, Hyder Ali and his son Tippu Sultan established their rule over the Mysore area. They violently resisted British rule in the area, but without adequate cooperation from other kingdoms, were defeated. Though killed by the British in 1799, Tippu Sultan was one of the only Indian leaders to defeat the British in battle, which made him as an iconic leader among the people in the modern era. In addition, the Nizams of Hyderabad ruled over large parts of Northeastern Karnataka. This land only became part of Karnataka after the passing of the 1956 States Reorganisation Act.

Muslims form approximately 12.91% of the population of Karnataka. While Muslims can be found in all districts of Karnataka, Muslims have a stronger presence in:
1. Northern Karnataka (especially in the area formerly ruled by the Princely State of Hyderabad) such as Gulbarga, Bidar, Bijapur, Raichur and Dharwad.
2. The districts bordering Kerala.

3. The cities of Bangalore, Mysore and Mangalore.

In coastal Karnataka in particular, Muslims form 24% of the population, the double of their overall share in the state, belonging to the Beary community which is known to be involved in trade and business, having particularly profited from the mass immigration to the Gulf from the '70s onward, owning diverse malls, hospitals, construction and educational institutions in the region.

On the other hand, the proportion of Muslims is lower in central Karnataka. The main spoken language of Muslims in interior Karnataka is a dialect called dakhini, often considered to be dialect of Urdu. Pinjara Muslims have Kannada as their mother tongue. At the south western coastal region i.e. Dakshina Kannada, Udupi and Kodagu there is concentration of Muslims who speak beary bashe(mix of malayalam and tulu), Kodava takk And Dakhini Urdu is also spoken in these regions by smaller Groups In the Cities of Mangalore,Moodabidri And Belthangady in Dakshina Kannada And Udupi District with most being spoken In Karkala and Kundapura. Other Muslim groups like Nawayath are also found in the region. There are a large number of Muslim run educational institutions in Karnataka. Muslims also have modestly higher levels of progress in terms of education and wealth in Karnataka (as in the rest of South India) than in states of North India, as they have more opportunities than their North Indian counterparts.

== Christianity ==
Christianity reached Karnataka during the 16th century with the arrival of the Portuguese and St. Francis Xavier in 1545. The majority of Christians are found on the western coast of Karnataka, extending from Karwar to Mangalore.

Mangalore has the largest population of Roman Catholics as compared to other parts of Karnataka. They are mostly descended from Goan Catholics and Orthodox Christians who immigrated from Goa in the 17th and 18th centuries. There are also some Protestants found in Karnataka. Many of them are of local origin. Protestants are the result of British missionaries' work during the British empire in India. However the British conversion was voluntary and not compulsory as Portuguese was in most cases. Due to this the Protestants are fewer in number as compared to the Catholics. Bangalore has a large number of Catholics as well as Protestant people.

St. Mary's Basilica is the only basilica in Karnataka and the oldest church in Bangalore. St. Aloysius Chapel, St. Joseph's Seminary and Milagres Church are century old churches in Mangalore with unique architecture and paintings.

== Jainism ==
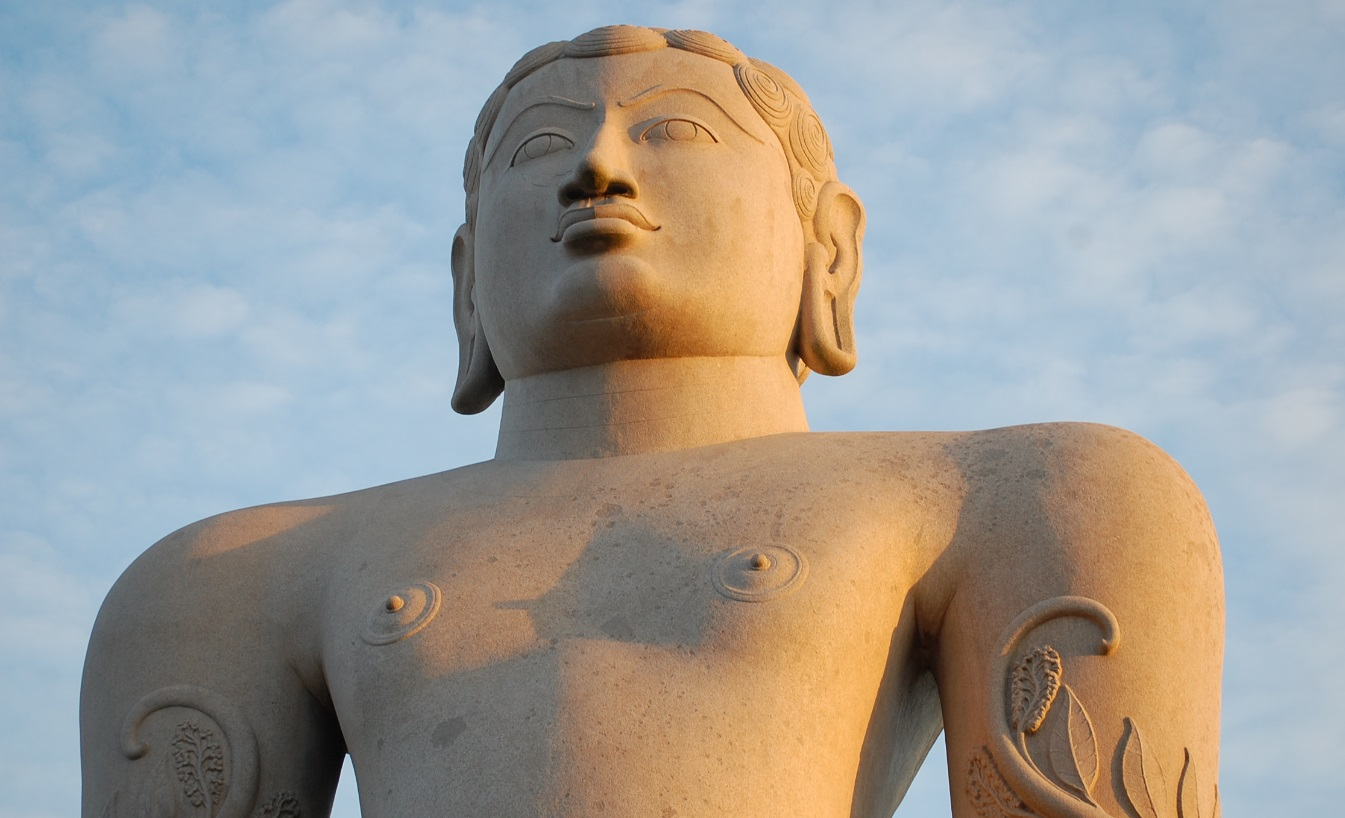
Gommateshvara Bahubali, 981 CE.

Jainism had a stronghold in Karnataka in the early medieval period at Shravanabelagola as its most important centre. The first Tirthankara, Rishabha, is said to have spent his final days in Karnataka. Both Jain philosophy and literature have contributed immensely to the religious and cultural landscape of Karnataka. Jain influence on literature and philosophy is particularly evident. Shravanabelgola, Moodabidri, and Karkala are famous for Jain history and monuments.

== Buddhism ==
Buddhism was once popular in Karnataka during the first millennium in places such as Gulbarga and Banavasi. A chance discovery of edicts and several Mauryan relics at Sannati in the Kalaburagi district in 1986 has proven that the Krishna river basin was once home to both Mahayana and Theravada Buddhism. In recent times, Buddhism thrives here and calls Dzogchen monastery and the Dhondeling Tibetan refugee camps as home.
