= Bandaje Falls =

Waterfall in Karnataka, India

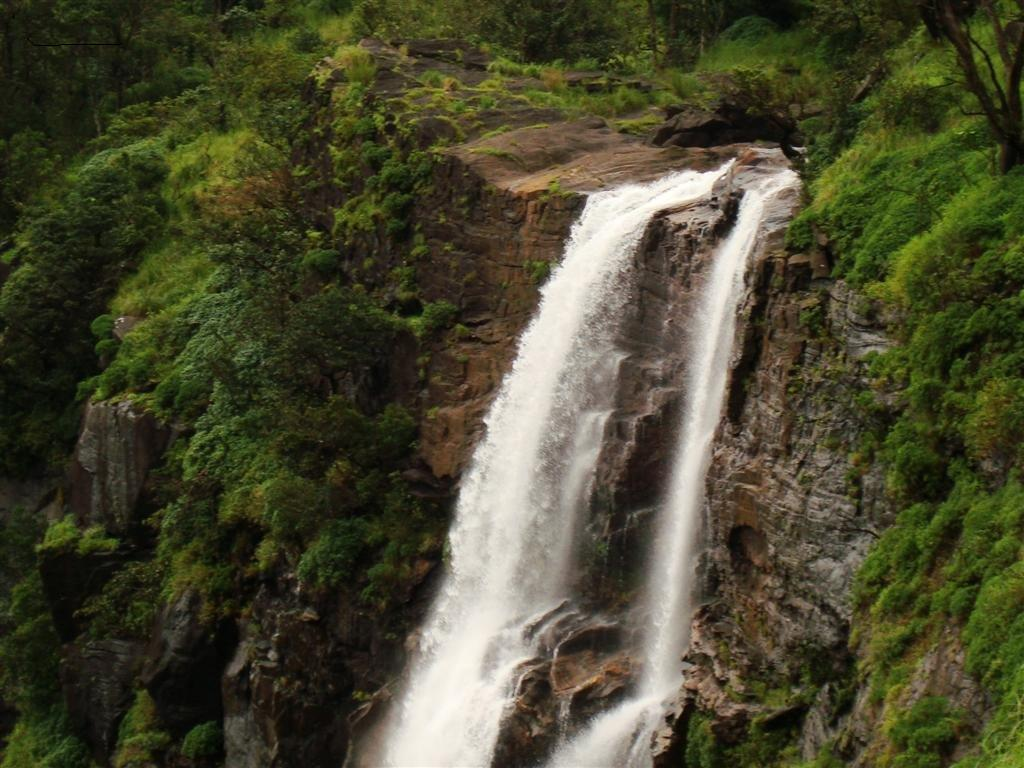
Bandaje Falls

Bandaje Falls, also known as Bandaje Arbi falls, is a waterfall located in the Kudremukha section of the Western Ghats in the Mudigere taluk of Chikkamagaluru district, Karnataka. The waterfalls can be reached only by undertaking trekking in thick forests and grass lands with the help of local guides and in summer the waterfalls goes dry. The height of waterfalls is about 200 feet.

== The falls ==
Bandaje falls is formed by a tributary of Netravathi River and is located in a remote area of western ghats, which can be reached through trekking with the help of guides. Height of waterfalls is about 200 feet.

The path to Bandaje falls from Valambra goes through thick ever green forest which ends in grass lands and those who trek without guide are likely to be lost in forest. To visit Bandaje Falls, there are two different routes. If you are travelling via Mangalore - Ujire, it is located 25 km from Ujire. Travel 6 km from Ujire towards Charmadi Ghat, take left at Somanthadka, travel for another 6 km, then take a right turn, and travel for 2 km to find a village named kadirudyavara, from where you can have the remote view of the Falls. However, you have to trek for 10 more km from Kadirudyavara to reach the falls. Locally this falls is called as Bandaje Arbi, where Arbi means falls in Tulu language. Permission from Belthangady wildlife range office, Kudremukh national park is required to trek to Bandaje falls. Ballalarayana Durga fort is there in one of the trekking routes.

== See also ==
- List of waterfalls
- List of waterfalls in India

== See also ==
- Mangalore
- Ujire
- Charmadi
- Mudigere
