= Mysore City lakes =

Coordinates: 12°18′10″N 76°40′23″E

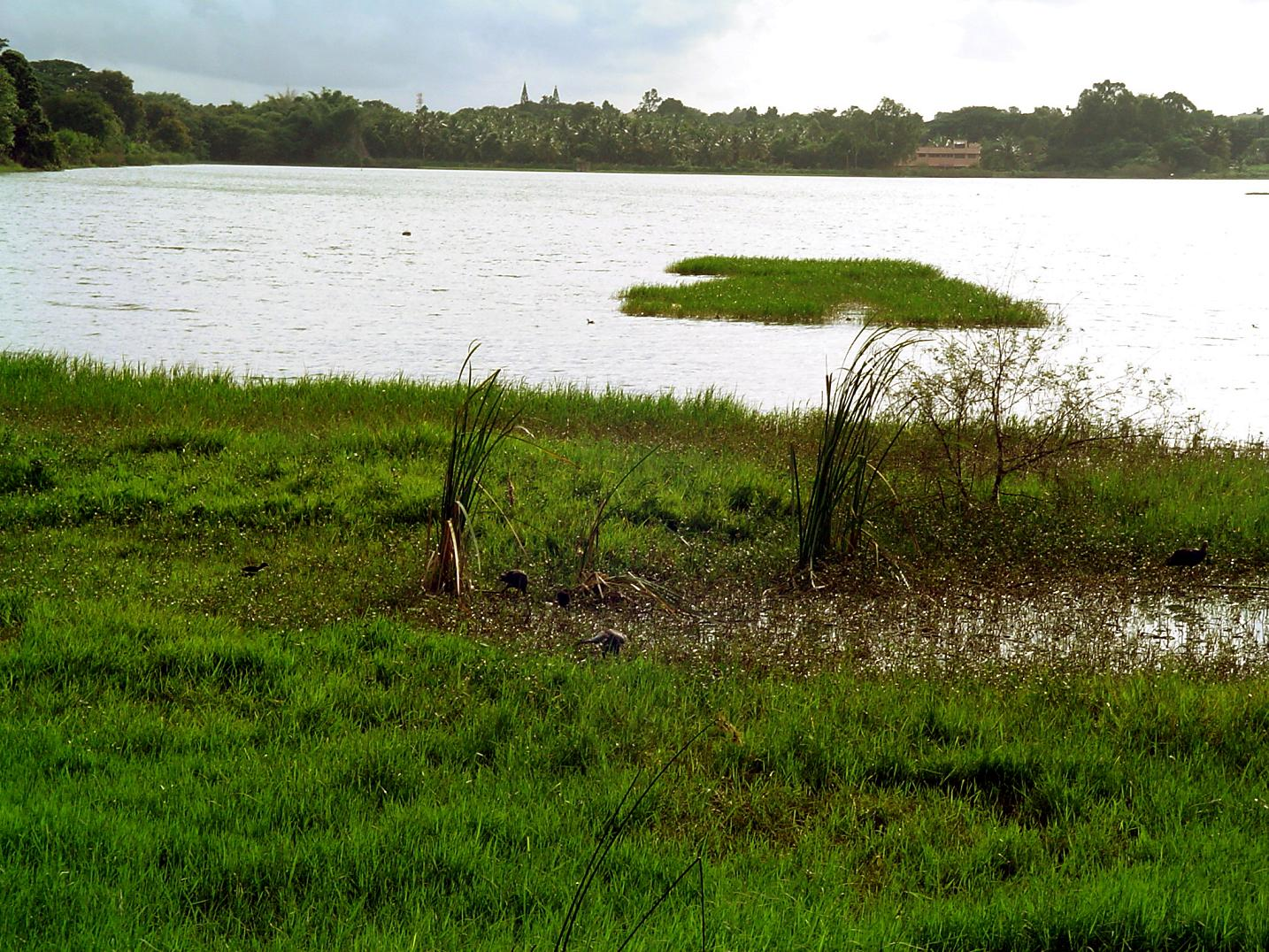
Kukkarahalli kere

Mysore, Karnataka, has major five lakes, some of which are under restoration with funds provided by the Asian Development Bank and government of Karnataka. These lakes are:

- Dalavai Lake
- Devanoor Lake
- Karanji Lake
- Kukkarahalli Lake
- Lingambudhi Lake
- Hebbal Lake
