= Honnuhole =

River in Karnataka, India

Coordinates: 12°10′22″N 77°04′23″E

The Honnuhole River (also Honnu Holae and Suvarnavathi) is a tributary of the Kaveri River in Karnataka, India. It arises south of Kollegal near the town of Yelandur and flows into the Kaveri just northwest of the town of Kollegal.
