= Varahi River =

River in India

Coordinates: 13°35′N 74°52′E

Varahi River originates and flows through Western Ghats in the Indian state of Karnataka. It is also known as Halady or Haladi river in downstream areas. It joins the Arabian sea after flowing through places like Halady, Basrur, Kundapura and Gangolli. It joins with the Souparnika River, Kedaka River, Chakra River, and Kubja River which are known by Panchagangavalli River and merges into the Arabian Sea. Pancha means five in Kannada and Samskrita and Ganga means river. According to mythology, Varaha is one of the incarnations of Vishnu. Varahi is the sister of Varaha-vishnu

== Geography ==
The river originates in the Western Ghats and flows into the Arabian Sea. It originates at a place called “Hebbagilu” near Agumbe in Thirthahalli taluk in the district of Shivamogga, from an elevation of 730 metres (2,400 ft) above mean sea level. Many tributaries join Varahi at places such as Shettykoppa, Halige, Kollavadi, and Bangaragalli. The annual rainfall varies from 20–1,280 centimetres (7.9–503.9 in). The river joins the Arabian Sea near Kundapura in the district of Udupi in Karnataka.

== Kunchikal Falls ==
The major waterfall is in Hosanagara Taluk, Shimoga. It is about 25 kilometres (16 mi) from the origin of the river. There are falls of 183 metres (600 ft) in cascades, popularly known as Kunchikal Falls.

== Varahi Hydro-electric Project ==
A hydroelectric dam, called Mani Dam (as it is constructed near Manibail village), across the Varahi river. Power generation takes place underground.
