= Basrur =

Basrur Barcelor
- village
- Location in Karnataka, India
- Coordinates: 13.6313°N 74.7388°E
- Country: India
- State: Karnataka
- District: Udupi

Area
  - Total: 5.764 km^{2} (2.225 sq mi)
- Elevation: 15.8496 m (52.000 ft)

Population (2011)
  - Total: 6,613
  - Density: 1,147/km^{2} (2,971/sq mi)
- Time zone: UTC+5:30 (IST)
- PIN: 576 211
- Vehicle registration: KA-20

Basrur / Basroor is a village in Kundapura taluk in Udupi district of Karnataka. Historically Basrur was also called Barcelor, Barcelore, Barcalor, Barzeloor, Basnur, Bares, Abu-Sarur and Barsellor.

== History ==
Basrur, once called Vasupura, is a historic port town on the banks of the Varahi River on the Kanara coast in Karnataka, India. For much of the sixteenth century and the first half of the seventeenth century, it was the rice port par excellence on that coast. The port was used by traders of several foreign countries mainly to cater for the needs of Keladi Samsthana, which was near Shimoga. The town had several streets, each specifically housing communities like traders, artisans, dancers, weavers etc. It was also famous for communities who were experts in singing and dancing, which art is forgotten and no longer exists. The town has become a small obscure village and the trade no longer exists.

In his travel account Moroccan Traveller Ibn Batuta (Abu Abdullah Mohammed (1304–1358)) who visited Canara on his way to Malabar from Honavar says, "The first town in the land of Mulaybar (Malabara) that we entered as the town of Abu-Sarur (Basrur), a small place on a large inlet and abounding in coco palms" British Major of Engineers James Rennel has concluded with due analysis that the Bares of Ptolemy's Map is the Barcelor or Basrur.

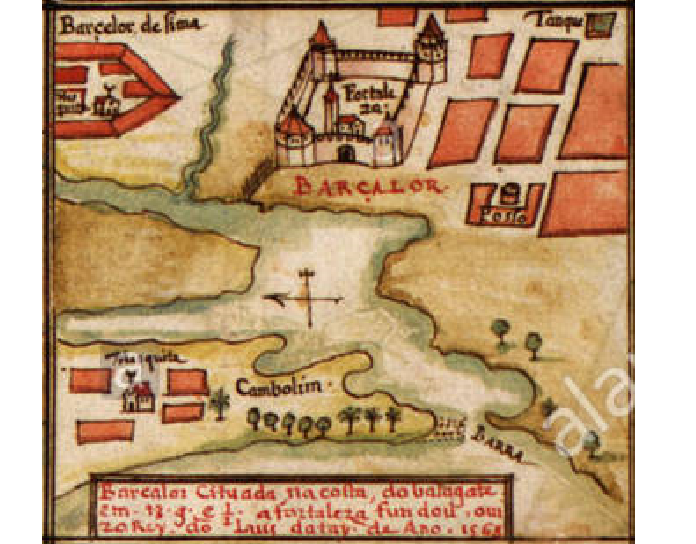
Portuguese Barcelor

Towards the end of the 16th century, Basrur came under Portuguese control, who built a church there and a fort called Santa Luzia. The town was called 'Barcelor' by the Portuguese.

On 13 February 1665, the Maratha ruler Shivaji conducted a naval raid on the Portuguese at Basrur, and gained a large booty which enabled him to strengthen the base of his new kingdom by building a strong navy and forts.

Basrur is famous for its old temples, the main one being the 'Shree Mahatobar Mahalingeshwara Temple'. The annual chariot festival (ratha or teru in Kannada) is held every April on Chitra Pournima - Hanuman Jayanti (in the Hindu calendar) day.

Out of 24 Temples of Basrur, The Nakhareshwara Temple is of historical importance. A 12th Century Inscription is the earliest inscription which mentions this temple. The Temple which is today called as Mahalingeshwara Temple was built by the mediaeval South Indian Merchant guild Nakhara. The deity of this temple was called Mahadeva in the mediaeval inscriptions of Basrur.

The town is a spiritual centre for the Goud Saraswat Brahmin community with 'Sri Mahalasa Narayani temple' at the center. The centuries-old temple is visited by the Swamijis of all Maths including Kashi Math Samsthana and Gokarna Parthagali Math. The legend is that the spirit for the Mahalasa temple was derived from its Moolasthana, i.e. Sri Mahalasa at Mardoli in Goa.

Noted Kannada novelist Dr. K. Shivarama Karanth has written a novel based on the life of Basrur people, mainly detailing song and dance community and the picture of early twentieth century of Basrur village is vividly described in this novel. The name of the novel is Mai Managala Suliyalli (1970) and this novel is one of the better novels of Dr. Karanth and is distributed by Sapna Book House, Bangalore.

== Demographics ==
According to Census (2001) Census (2011)

== Languages ==
Kundagannada a dialect of Kannada spoken by majority of people in the region. Konkani used by Roman Catholic Christians and Goud Saraswat Brahmins. Beary, Urdu & Navayati used by Muslim communities. Quite a few Basel Mission a Christian missionary society speaks Tulu.

== Transportation ==
This place is less than 2 km from Kundapura Railway Station on the Konkan railway route. Public transport is operated by private bus services and autorickshaws. Small time water transport facility is also there with wooden boats managed by local fishermen. This mode of transportation was predominant up to first half of 20th century.

== Local areas ==
"Basrur" is connected to other sub-villages (koodu-grama) like Hattikudru, Anagalli, Margoli, Merdy, Japthi, Kalanje, Othinane (Panakada-katte), Kolkere, Ulloor, Kandavara Balkur and gulwady with new bridge to form a larger area.

== Notable people ==
- Ravi Basrur an Indian film music composer, sound designer, lyricist and director

== See also ==
- Udupi district
- Mangalore
