= Chakra River =

River in Karnataka

The Chakra River is a river flowing through Kundapur and Gangolli in western India. It converges with the Souparnika River, Varahi River and Kubja River at the Panchagangavalli River, and flows into the Arabian Sea.

== Chakra Dam ==
The Chakra Dam is close to the town of Chakranagar (located on the route from Shivamogga from Mangaluru via Mastikatte, Nagara). It was built as a balancing reservoir for the Linganamakki Dam, but was never used for this purpose and does not have sluice gate to the Linganamakki Dam. The Chakra Dam was a Karnataka Power Corporation project and the chief engineer was B Seetharam. Special permission is needed to visit this dam.
