= Kubja River =

The Kubja River is a river flowing through Kundapur and Gungulli in western India. It joins with the Souparnika River, Varahi River, Chakra River, and Kedaka River and merges into the Arabian Sea.
