= Dandavati =

Coordinates: 14°35′N 75°06′E

Dandavati is a river in Shivamogga district, Karnataka, India. It flows through Sorab taluk and joins the Varada River, a tributary of the Tungabhadra River. The river originates at Honnavali near Ulvi in Sorab taluk and flows northwest towards its confluence with the Varada river near Bankasana. Varada, in turn, joins Tungabhadra and later Krishna River which finally joins the Bay of Bengal in the East coast of India.

== Tributaries ==
Several minor streams originating in Sorab feed the Dandavati. Among the more notable of these are Nagarahalla, Yelavatadahalla, Gudvihalla, Kannanamanchalla and Kuppehalla. These streams, along with numerous smaller ones, converge to form the Dandavati.

== Geology and hydrology ==
The Dandavati river basin forms part of the Shimoga Schist Belt of the Western Dharwar Craton. Its geological formations include greywacke, argillite, quartz-chlorite schist, orthoquartzite, ferruginous chert and laterite. The groundwater potential of the Dandavati basin into five categories. It identified 7.18% of the area as having very good groundwater potential, 13.33% as good, 25.97% as moderate, 39.49% as poor and 14.01% as very poor.

== Local traditions and Myth ==
According to a local tradition, the name "Sorab" is derived from "Surabhi", the mythical cow of plenty. The legend states that Surabhi and four other celestial cows, Nanda, Bhadra, Susilya and Sumana, used to shed milk over the image of Ranganatha on the bank of the Dandavati River. Sri Ranganathaswamy Temple dedicated to Ranganatha is built on the bank of this river.

== Dandavati Reservoir Project ==
A reservoir has been planned across the Dandavati river at Marur, near Sorab. It was designed to store 5,097 crore liters (50.97 billion liters) or 1.8 billion cubic feet of water and irrigate 17,500 acres, and would submerge 1,888 acres, including 1,426 acres of cultivable land, 113 acres of forest and four villages.

Earlier proposals for a reservoir on the river, dating back to the colonial period, had been rejected on viability and feasibility grounds. Farmers who feared displacement protested against the project. In January 2009, they camped at Marur for a week after Chief Minister B. S. Yediyurappa announced that he would lay the foundation stone. The Dandavati Virodhi Horata Samiti, which led the opposition, said the project was being pursued for political reasons and questioned the rationale of irrigating dry land by submerging fertile farmland and forest. Farmers said that if the government wanted to irrigate the taluk, it should implement the Bythanala irrigation project, which was planned in the 1970s.

Opposition leaders including H. D. Deve Gowda and S. Bangarappa joined the protests and accused Yediyurappa of pushing the project for political reasons, while state minister H. Halappa said that implementing it had been a BJP election promise. In March 2010, Rajya Sabha member M. V. Mysura Reddy of Andhra Pradesh objected to the project, saying Karnataka was starting it on a tributary in the Tungabhadra sub-basin while the Krishna water dispute was pending before the tribunal.
