= Souparnika River =

River in India

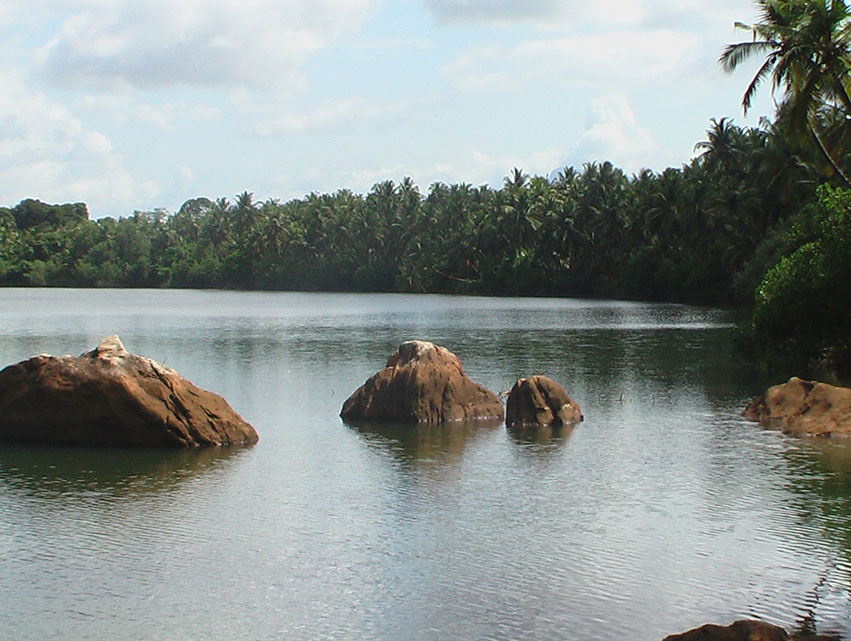
Tranquil waters of Souparnika River

Souparnika River or Sowparnika nadi is a river flowing through Byndoor taluk in Karnataka, India. It joins with the Varahi River, Kedaka River, Chakra River, and Kubja River known as Panchagangavali River and merges into the Arabian Sea. It flows near Mookambika Temple, Kollur hence sometimes known as Kolluru nadi and is considered a holy river by devotees of the temple.

It is believed that Garuda (eagle) called Suparna performed penance on the banks of the river and attained salvation thus the name become Souparnika. It is also believed that river absorbs the elements of 64 different medicinal plants and roots as it flows, therefore it cures diseases of those who bath in it.

== Distances from Kollur ==
1. Byndoor: 28 km
2. Kundapura: 38 km
3. Udupi: 74 km
4. Murudeshwara: 59 km
5. Mangalore: 128 km
6. Shivamogga: 128 km
7. Bangalore: 426 km
8. Sringeri: 110 km
9. Bhatkal: 47 km
10. Karwar: 170 km
11. Ankola: 140 km
12. Gokarna: 135 km
13. Kumta: 104 km
14. Honnavar: 83 km
