= Kundapur =

Kundapra
- Town
- Kundapura
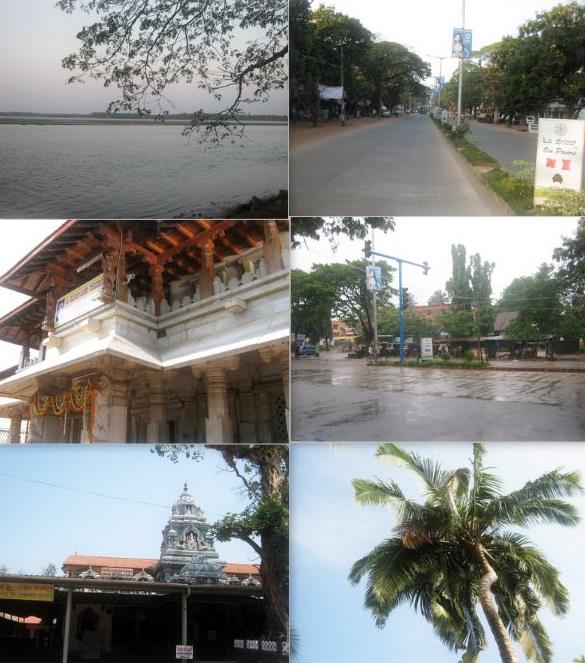
- Clockwise from top: Kundapur River, Main Road, Shastri Circle, Coconut tree, Anegudde Sri Vinayaka temple, Kollur Mookambika temple
- Interactive map of Kundapra
- Coordinates: 13°37′42″N 74°41′20″E
- Country: India
- State: Karnataka
- District: Udupi
- Region: Tulunadu
- Settled: 1912
- Named for: Kundeshwara

Government
  - Type: Municipality
  - Body: Kundapura Town Municipal Council

Area
  - Total: 23.06 km^{2} (8.90 sq mi)
- Elevation: 80 m (260 ft)

Population (2011)
  - Total: 30,444
  - Density: 1,320/km^{2} (3,419/sq mi)
- Demonym: Kundapurian

Languages
  - Official: Kannada
  - Regional: Kundagannada, Konkani, Tulu, Malayalam
- Time zone: UTC+5:30 (IST)
- PIN: 576 201
- Telephone code: 91-(0)8254
- ISO 3166 code: IN-KA
- Vehicle registration: KA-20
- Sex ratio: 1.09 ♂/♀
- Lok Sabha Constituency: Udupi Chikmagalur
- Vidhan Sabha Constituency: Kundapura
- Website: www.kundapurtown.mrc.gov.in

Kundapra, officially Kundapura, is a town and taluka in the Udupi district of Karnataka state in India. This town was known as Coondapoor when it was part of the erstwhile South Canara district (1862–1947) of the Madras Presidency of British India. Present-day Kundapur is administered by the Kundapur Town Municipal Council and serves as the headquarters of eponymous Kundapur taluk in Udupi district.

== Etymology ==
The name Kundapura can be traced to the Kundeshwara Temple built by Kundavarma of the Alupa dynasty who ruled the region in the 10th - 11th century, in the vicinity of the Panchagangavalli River. In Kundagannada language, the word "Kunda" also refers to the flower Jasmine. Where the Majority people of Kundapura grow flower Jasmine in this region which came to be called as kundapura (Land of Jasmine).

== History ==
The history of Kundapur is defined by its strategic position as a maritime gateway and its transition through several major South Indian dynasties.

=== Ancient and Medieval Periods ===
During the 10th and 11th centuries, Kundapur flourished under the Alupa dynasty. King Kundavarma of the Alupas is credited with the construction of the Kundeshwara Temple, which became a central landmark for the settlement. The region was later integrated into the Vijayanagara Empire. During this era, Kundapur served as a vital administrative and commercial hub, facilitating trade between the interior Malnad regions and overseas markets.

=== Portuguese era ===
Following the decline of the Vijayanagara Empire in 1565, the Portuguese East India Company capitalized on its weakening control over the West Coast. In 1567, they established a presence at Mangalore, constructing the St. Sebastiao fort along with a church. They further expanded by building a fort at Honnavar (Onor) in 1569 and another at Kundapur in 1570, while also setting up trading factories at Basrur (Barcelore) and Gangolli (Cambolim).

=== Keladi rule ===
Under the leadership of Shivappa Nayaka (r. 1645–1660) of the Keladi Nayaka dynasty, the Keladi forces waged a series of campaigns to dismantle Portuguese influence. By 1652, the Keladi army successfully captured the Portuguese fort at Kundapur and destroyed the Portuguese fleet at Gangolli, forcing them to abandon the region entirely by 1654.

=== Mysore and British Rule ===
In the 18th century, the Kingdom of Mysore under Hyder Ali defeated Queen Virammaji, the last rule of Keladi and seized control of the region and the town, constructing a redoubt (fortification) to command the river entrance. In 1799, following the death of Tipu Sultan in the Third Anglo-Mysore War, the British annexed the region. It was incorporated into the South Canara district of the Madras Presidency, where it remained until the reorganization of Indian states.

=== Post Indian independence ===
After India's independdence, Kundapur remained part of the Madras Presidency until 1 November 1956 when during the Reorganisation of States, the South Canara district (which included Kundapur) was detached from the Madras State and merged into the Mysore State. On 1 November 1973, Mysore State was renamed to Karnataka state.

== Geography ==
Kundapura town is surrounded by water from three sides. To the north lies the Panchagangavalli River. To the east lies the Kalaghar river. To the west lie the Kodi backwaters sea walk and the Arabian Sea, leaving the south side as the main connecting land mass. All connecting roads to Kundapura enter the city from the southern direction. North side of the town is vast backwaters of Panchagangavali river and a bridge has been constructed across it. Kundapur Taluk is bounded on the west by the Arabian Sea, on the south by Brahmavara Taluk, on the north by Byndoor Taluk, and the east by the Western Ghats.

=== Rivers ===
Kundapur taluk has several rivers and experiences heavy rainfall. The main rivers are the Chakra, Souparnika, Varahi, Kubja, and Kheta. In fact, there are seven rivers or rivulets between Kundapur and Byndoor, a short distance of 36 km. They are Halady River, Kollur River, Chakra River, Rajadi, Nujadi, Yadamavina Hole and Uppunda Hole.

== Demographics ==
As of the 2011 India census,

- Kundapur Town has a population of 30,444.
- Kundapur Taluk has a population of 398,471
- Males constitute 49% of the population and females 51%.
- Literate population was 25,191, with a Literacy rate of 82%, higher than the national average of 74.04%.
Languages of Kundapur Town (2011)
1. Kannada (63.4%)
2. Konkani (22.9%)
3. Urdu (4.30%)
4. Malayalam (1.70%)
5. Tulu (1.20%)
6. Others (6.50%)

== Transport ==
Kundapur is connected to other parts of the country by NH66. SH52 is a State Highway that connects to Shimoga District. This Highway connects cities and towns of different states. Kundapur is also connected to the Konkan Railway, which runs from Mumbai to Mangaluru. The railway station is about 4 kilometres (2.5 mi) from the town. The nearest airport is Mangaluru International Airport, at Bajpe around 87 kilometres (54 mi) from Kundapur.

Kundapura railway station, along the Konkan Railway, is used by Kerala pilgrims who visit Kolluru Mookambika Temple.

Kundapur is located at a distance of 38 km (24 mi) from Udupi, 40 km (25 mi) from Manipal, 30 km (19 mi) from Byndoor, 54 km (34 mi) Bhatkal, 91 km (57 mi) from Mangaluru and 181 km (112 mi) from Karwar, which are the other major cities/towns in Coastal Karnataka.

There are private local buses, and some out-of-town destinations are serviced by government owned buses. Buses can be found for Udupi and Mangaluru, and there are multiple bus stands. The main bus stand where the buses to Udupi and Mangaluru are available is called "New bus stand", and is near the police station. Another frequently used mode of transportation is auto rickshaw.

== Notable people ==
- Ravi Basrur
- Siddharth Basrur
- K. Shivaram Karanth
- Kota Srinivas Poojary
- Rishab Shetty
- Kashinath (actor)
- Upendra
- Mogeri Gopalakrishna Adiga
- Vaidehi
- Sanchita Padukone
- Satish Acharya
