= Karnire =

- Village
- Karnire Village in 2026
- Interactive map of Karnire
- Location in Karnataka, India Karnire (India)
- Coordinates: 13.1132°N 74.8244°E
- Country: India
- State: Karnataka
- District: Dakshina Kannada
- Region: Tulunaad (South Canara)
- Elevation: 24 m (79 ft)

Population (2011)
  - Total: 920

Languages
  - Official: Kannada,Tulu
  - Other Regional languages: Kannada, Tulu, Konkani
- Time zone: UTC+5:30 (IST)
- PIN: 574154
- ISO 3166 code: IN-KA
- Vehicle registration: KA-19
- Nearest city: Mangaluru
- Lok Sabha constituency: Dakshina Kannada
- Vidhan Sabha constituency: Moodabidri

Karnire is a panchayat town located at Mangalore taluk in Dakshina Kannada district in the Indian state of Karnataka. It is on the banks of Shambhavi River. It is next to the small village of Kavathar, Balkunje. Its nearest town is Palimar in Udupi District.

== Geography ==
It has an average elevation of 24 metres. It is in the Karavalli region of karnataka, where it is suitable for agriculture and building factories. It is next to the River Shambhavi, which originates from kudremukh and ends at mulki with the Arabian Sea.

== Agriculture ==
The major crops grown are paddy and sugar cane along with neighbouring villages like Balkunje and palimar.

== Transport ==
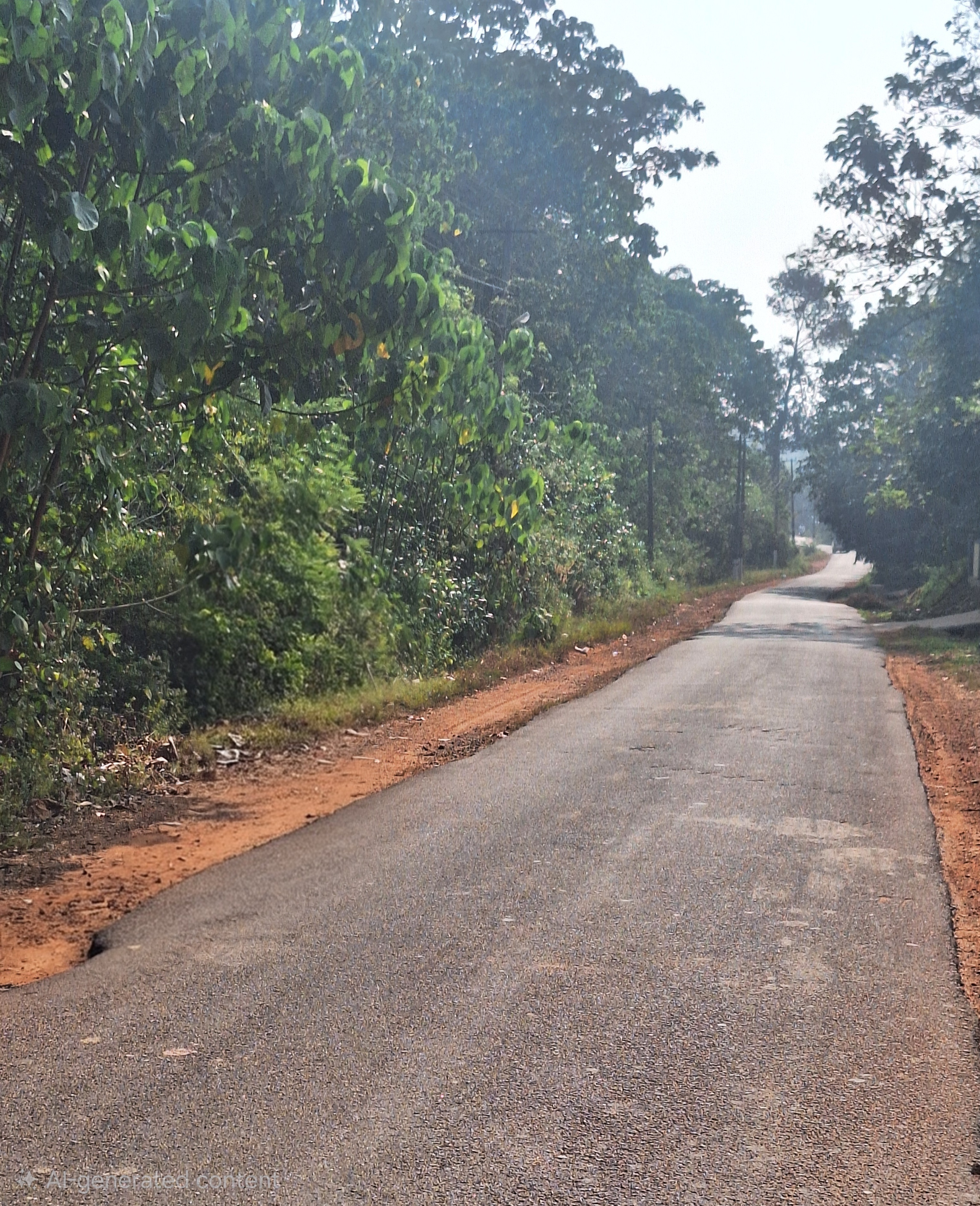
Karnire district road towards Balkunje Village

Shambhavi River Seen from Karnire-Palimar bridge at 2026

The town is well connected by roads to Palimar, Padubidri, Bajpe, Kateel,Balkunje and Kinnigoli by district road. But due to aging structure of the bridge between Balkunje and Palimar, it is closed for heavy vehicles and private buses. Buses used to ply from Karnire to Palimar and Padubidri and Adve(kinnigolli-palimar or padubidri route). But due to bridge closing towards Palimar buses ply from Balkunje or either Karnire to towns like Kinnigoli and Kateel.

The nearest airport to this town is Mangalore International Airport, which is around 30 km from the village.

Although the nearest railway station is Nandikoor railway station, people prefer to go at Mulki railway station as it is the nearest station for people to go to various big cities like Mumbai, Murudeshwar, and Mangalore while Nandikur does not provide access to these cities.

== See also ==
- Udupi
- Mulki
- Konkan railway
