= Balkunje =

- Village
- Balkunje Village
- Interactive map of Balkunje
- Location in Karnataka, India Balkunje (India)
- Coordinates: 13.1181°N 74.8430°E
- Country: India
- State: Karnataka
- District: Dakshina Kannada
- Region: Tulunaad (South Canara)
- Elevation: 24 m (79 ft)

Population (2011)
  - Total: 1,551

Languages
  - Official: Kannada,Tulu
  - Other Regional: Konkani,Beary
- Time zone: UTC+5:30 (IST)
- PIN: 574154
- ISO 3166 code: IN-KA
- Vehicle registration: KA-19
- Nearest city: Mangaluru
- Lok Sabha constituency: Dakshina Kannada
- Vidhan Sabha constituency: Moodabidri

Balkunje is a panchayat town located at Mangalore taluk in Dakshina Kannada district in the Indian state of Karnataka. It is on the banks of Shambhavi River. It is next to the small village of Kavathar, Karnire. Its nearest town is Palimar in Udupi District.

== Geography ==
It has an average elevation of 24 metres. It is in the Karavalli region of karnataka, where it is suitable for agriculture and building factories. It is next to the River Shambhavi, which originates from kudremukh and ends at mulki with the Arabian Sea.

== Agriculture ==
Agriculture in Balkunje Village

The major crops grown are paddy and sugar cane.

== Transportation ==
The town is well connected by roads to Palimar, Padubidri, Bajpe, Kateel,Karnire and Kinnigoli by district road. But due to aging structure of the bridge between Balkunje and Palimar, it is closed for heavy vehicles and private buses. Buses used to ply from Balkunje to Palimar and Padubidri and Adve. But due to bridge closing towards Palimar buses ply from Balkunje or either Karnire to towns like Kinnigoli and Kateel.

The nearest airport to this town is Mangalore International Airport, which is around 30 km from the village.

Although the nearest railway station is Nandikur railway station, people prefer to go at Mulki railway station as it is the nearest station for people to go to various big cities like Mumbai, Murudeshwar, and Mangalore while Nandikur does not provide access to these cities.

== Proposed KIABD industrial area ==
There was a proposal for building an industrial area. But people protested against this action. and the government decided not to build the industrial area.

== See also ==
- Udupi
- Mulki
- Konkan railway
