= Attur-kemral =

Attur-kemral Athur Kemral
- village
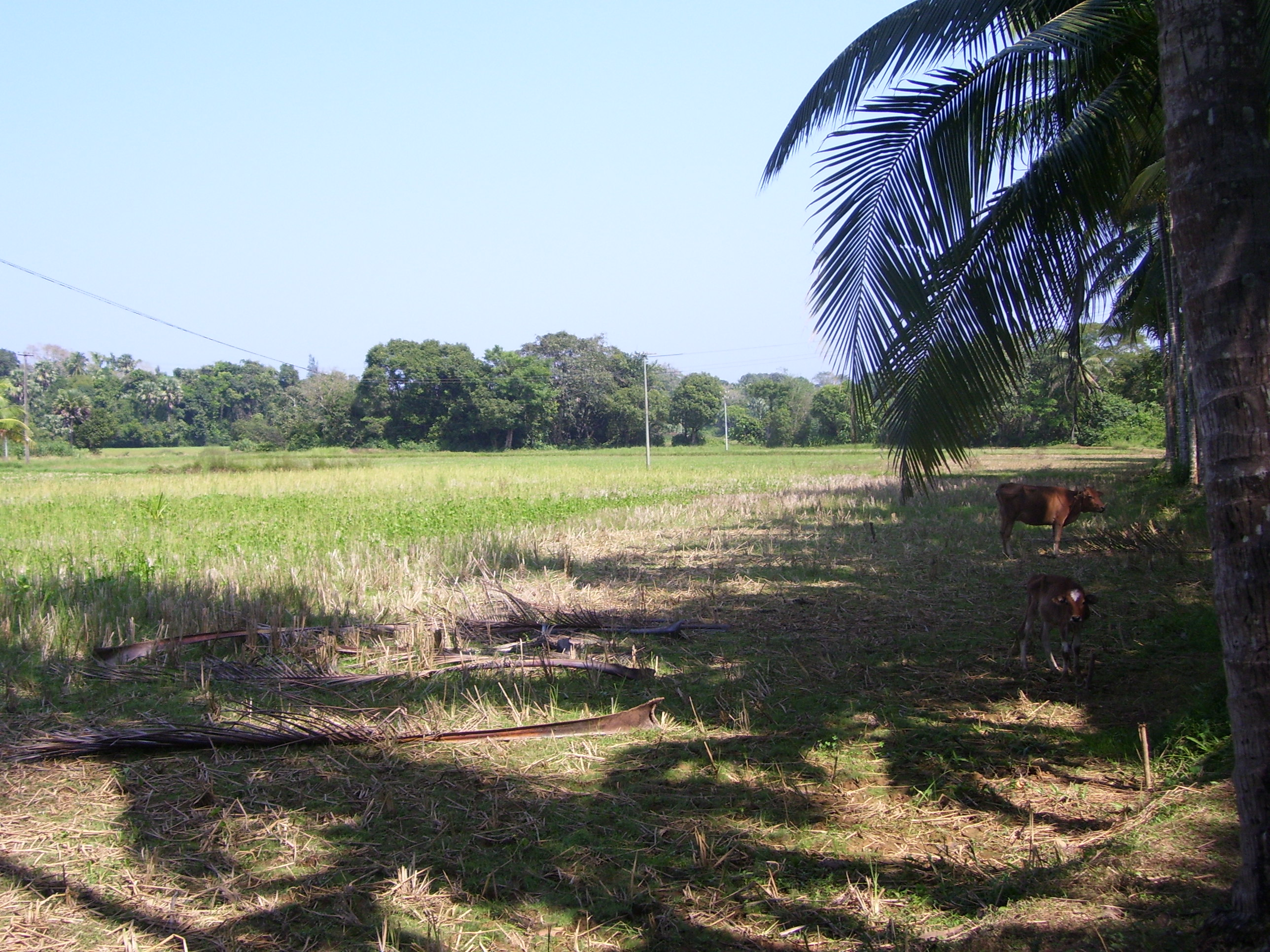
- Attur village
- Country: India
- State: Karnataka

Languages
  - Official: Kannada
- Time zone: UTC+5:30 (IST)

Attur or Atturu is a village coming under Kemral post office in Dakshina Kannada(South Kanara) district of Karnataka state in India. Attur village comes under Kemral grama panchayat, Mulki taluk, Dakshina Kannada district, Karnataka state, India It is near to Kinnigoli town. Nandini river originates from eastern part of Kateel at Muchur and the origin is further up to 20km near small village arteri. There is a bridge connecting north and south near a place called Kayer Muger from where people can go to famous place called Nellitheertha. The village is famous for Attur Udupa's Panchangam (Almanac) for Hindus, which is widely followed in the district. The Udupa family of Attur - Bailu brings out the almanac.

== Nearby Places ==
- Mangalore
- Kateel
- Pakshikere
- Kinnigoli
- Mulki
- Haleangadi
- Suratkal
