= Kavathar =

- Village
- Interactive map of Kavathar
- Location in Karnataka, India Kavathar (India)
- Coordinates: 13°05′53″N 74°49′36″E
- Country: India
- State: Karnataka
- District: Dakshina Kannada
- Region: Tulunaad (South Canara)
- Elevation: 24 m (79 ft)

Population (2011)
  - Total: 2,089

Languages
  - Official: Kannada,Tulu
  - Other Regional: Konkani,Beary
- Time zone: UTC+5:30 (IST)
- PIN: 574154
- ISO 3166 code: IN-KA
- Vehicle registration: KA-19
- Nearest city: Mangaluru
- Lok Sabha constituency: Dakshina Kannada
- Vidhan Sabha constituency: Moodabidri

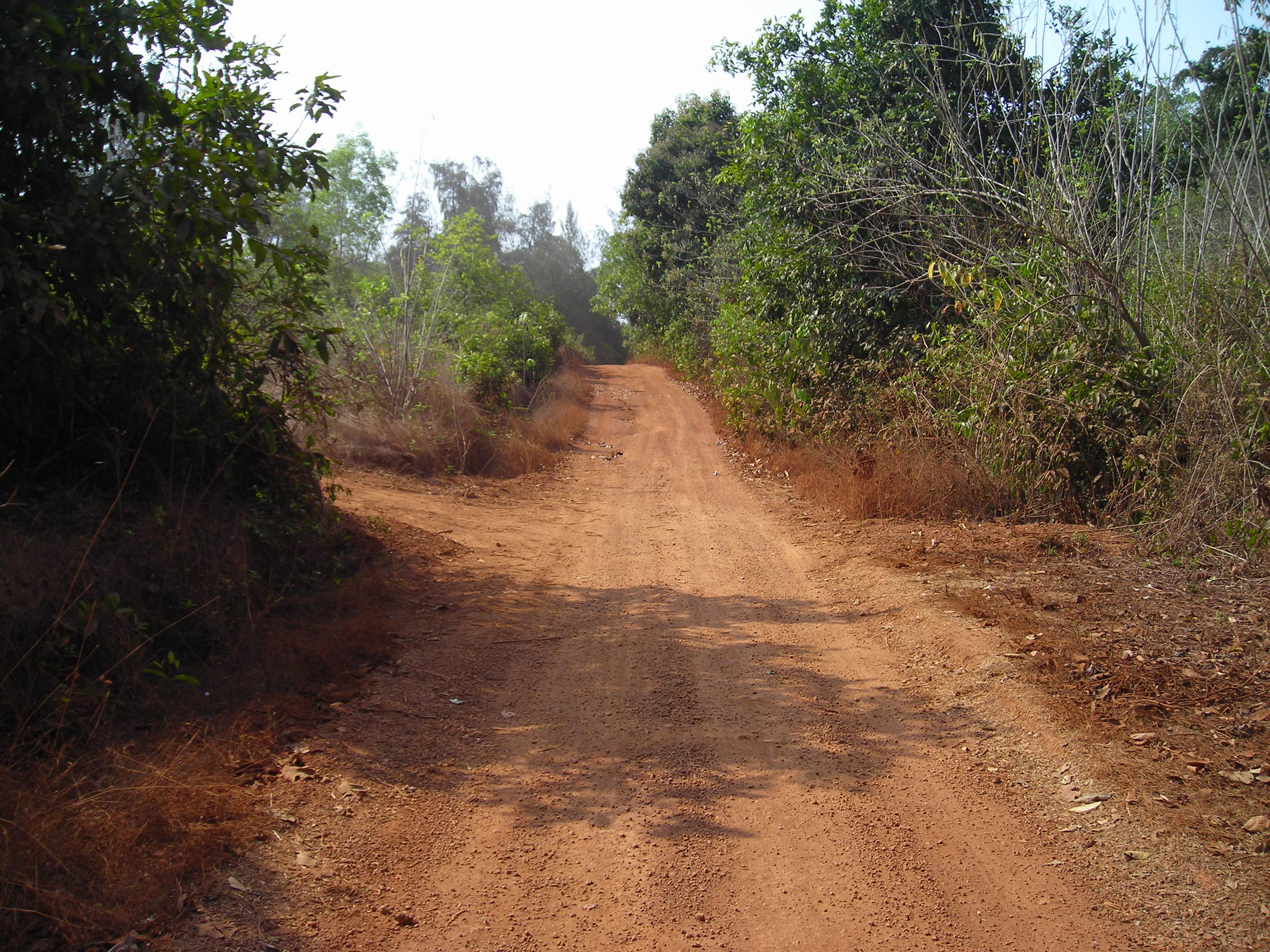
Main road that runs through the entire village of Kavathar

Kavathar is a village located in Mangalore Taluk in the northernmost part of Dakshina Kannada, close to the small town of Balkunje. Its postal code is 574154. Batta Benny muji kere is a pond located at kavathar that attracts migrated birds.

== History ==
Butta Benny is an area of Bhuts populated by the Goud Saraswat Brahmin community, who migrated from southern areas such as Kateel. They included Kamaths, Nayaks, Pai and other groups who were converted to Roman Catholicism by Portuguese missionaries and were offered lands in remote areas such as Butta Benny. This area now has Christians with surnames such as D'Souza and Aroza. The place is known by the name Girijana Colony, since the northern half has been distributed among the Scheduled Castes and Scheduled Tribes by the government.

== Religion ==
The D'Souza family of Kavathar made significant contributions towards St.Paul's Church, Balkunje. A temple named Siri Abbagha Dharagha Mahalingeshwar Temple was built under the Ajila family. It is known for its annual Siri Jatra during the Pagu Purnima.

== Description ==
People residing in the northern half visit markets of Palimar and Padubidri of Udupi District, while those who live in the southern half visit Kinnigoli and Mulki. Nearby villages include Kirem, Damarskatte, Pompei(India-a village) Aikala, Panjinadka and Karnad. It has no shops, and hardly a few houses The place is partially famous for its Kavatharu Temple, where Bhuta Kola is held annually.

== Demographics ==
In 2011 there were 357 households in Kavathar village, according to the census data. The total population was 2089, of which 724 were males and 805 were females. There were 144 children between the age of 0 and 6, 68 male and 76 female.

== Education ==
The primary school in Kavathur celebrated its 100th anniversary in 2012.

== Economy ==
Kavathar has no concrete roads. Farming was abandoned, as newer generations left the area and migrated to Mangalore, Mumbai or Pune or immigrated.

Transport facilities are almost absent. The village has no bus service, because without a bridge between Balkunje and Kavathar, service was not economically feasible. The bridge was opposed by temple authorities who claimed that it would disturb the pilgrimage. The bridge was later constructed.

== Nature ==
It has forest area with diverse species of birds and mammals. Peacocks are found in abundance, while tigers, who once inhabited its forests have vanished. It has a wide range of snakes, and a number of coconut and cashew trees.
