= Santhoor =

- Village
- Location in Karnataka, India Santhoor (India)
- Coordinates: 13°9′9″N 74°50′32″E
- Country: India
- State: Karnataka
- District: Udupi

Government
  - Body: Mudarangadi Gram panchayat

Languages
  - Official: Kannada, Tulu
- Time zone: UTC+5:30 (IST)
- PIN: 574111
- ISO 3166 code: IN-KA
- Vehicle registration: KA
- Website: karnataka.gov.in

Santhoor is a village in Udupi taluk, Karnataka state, India. This village comes under Mudrangadi Gram Panchayat, Kapu Taluk.

Santhoor pin code is 574111, and the Post Office's name is Santhoor Post.

Santhoor Subramanya Temple is a Hindu temple located in the village of Santhoor near Padubidri, Karnataka. Here Kartikeya is worshipped as Subramanya, lord of all serpents.

Tulu, Konkani and Kannada are spoken by many.

St. Theresa's Church Mukamar and St. Luke's church located in this village.

Nearby villages include Kuthyaru, Kukkikatte, Yelluru, Pilar, Nandikoor, Inna, Belman, Palimaru, Padubidre and Shirva. The nearest cities are Karkala, Moodubidre, Udupi and Mangalore.

It is close to the Arabian Sea.
