= Permude =

- Gram panchayat
- Permude
- Location of Permude in Karnataka, India Permude (India)
- Coordinates: 13.0015°N 74.8835°E
- Country: India
- State: Karnataka
- District: Dakshina Kannada
- Tehsil: Mangalore taluk
- Time zone: UTC+5:30 (IST)
- Pincode(s): 574509.

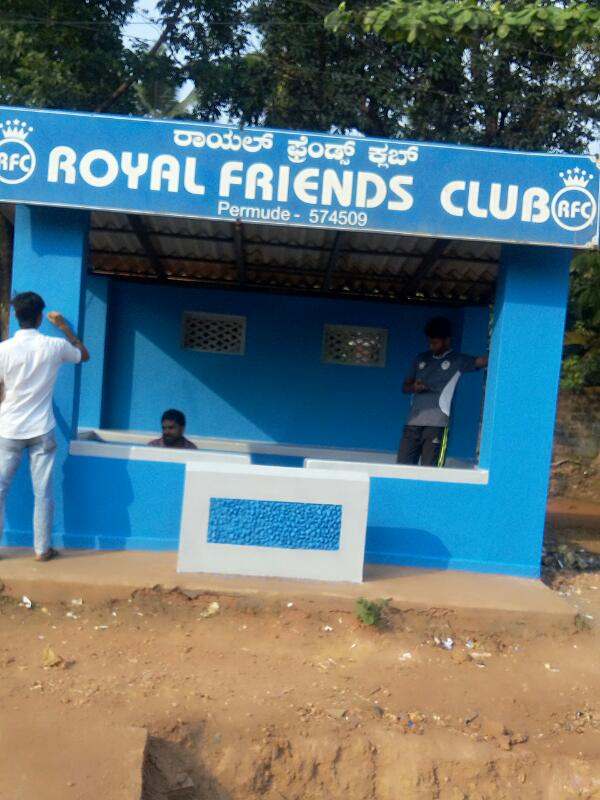
Permude (Rasal) Bus Stand.

Permude is a village (panchayat) located in the Mangalore taluk, Dakshina Kannada district, in Karnataka state, India. The name, "Permude", derived from Perda Mudde (Tulu Language), is a reference to the milk that was once locally produced in large quantities. Permude is located approximately 360 kilometers from the state capital, Bangalore. Nearby villages include Bajpe and Kinnigoli. According to 2011 census information, Permude's location code or village code is 617478. The village comprises an area of 742.69 hectares. Permude falls under the Mangalore Special Economic Zone (MSEZ).

== Inhabitants ==
The Kudubis, who reside in Permude, are an Adivasi community. Their customs are similar to other tribes of central India. In 2011 the Kudubi people opposed the MSEZ operating company's attempt to construct a boundary wall on land the company had acquired in Permude. The construction was opposed as a result of reported damage to farms and crops caused by the construction.

== Banks and financial institutions ==
- Canara Bank (ATM), Permude
- Union Bank of India (ATM), Permude
- Canara Bank (ATM), Bajpe
- Bank of Baroda (ATM), Bajpe

== Schools and educational institutions ==
- Government Urdu Primary School
- St.Francis Xavier Higher Primary School/ Yekkar
- St. Joseph PU college, Kateel Road Bajpe
- St. Joseph High School, Kateel Road Bajpe
- Ansar English Medium School, Bajpe
- The Visionnaire Academy, Bajpe
- Popular Bunts English Medium School, Bajpe
- Morning Star School, Bajpe

== Religious institutions ==
=== Temples ===
- Shree Durgaparameshwari Temple, Kateel
- Ayyappa Bajana Mandir
- Shree Shanishwara Temple
- Shree Somanatheshawara Temple

=== Churches ===
- St John the Baptist Church, Permude

=== Mosques ===
- Jamiya Masjid, Permude
- Usmaniya Mohammedi Masjid, Permude
- Minara Masjid, Batrakere
- Badriya Juma Masjid, Padil
- Khwaja Masjid, Korakambla

== Clubs ==
- Royal Friends Club
- Jamiya Cricketers

== Transportation ==
- The nearest railway station to Permude is Tokur, which is 7.3 km away.
- Mangalore Central railway station is 20.6 km away.
- The nearest airport to Permude is Mangalore International Airport, 5.8 km away.
- Bajpe bus stand, 3.2 KM
