= Pakshikere =

Hamlet in Karnataka, India

- village
- Location in Karnataka, India Pakshikere (India)
- Coordinates: 13°2′59.72″N 74°49′22.91″E
- Country: India
- State: Karnataka
- District: Dakshina Kannada

Languages
  - Official: Kannada
- Time zone: UTC+5:30 (IST)

Pakshikere is a hamlet on the Haleyangady to Kinnigoli route. This hamlet is situated in Mangalore taluk of Dakshina Kannada district of Karnataka, India. Pakshikere in Kannada literally means bird's lake or lake of birds. Pakshi means bird and kere means lake. Pakshikere has religious centers such as Suragiri Temple, Jarandaya Banta Sthana, Badriya Jumma Masjid, and the St Jude Church and Shrine founded in the year 1960.

A social enterprise known as Paper Seed Co. is based in Pakshikere.

== Nearby places ==
- Mangalore
- Kateel
- Kinnigoli
- Attur-kemral
- Mulki
- Punaroor
- Hosakadu
- Thokur
- Damaskatte
- S. Kodi (Shinapai Kodi)
