= Santhoor Subramanya Temple =

Coordinates: 13.15852°N 74.837778°E

Religion
- Affiliation: Hinduism
- District: Udupi
- Deity: Kartikeya as a Nāga
- Festivals: Shasti, Kiru Shasti, Nagara Panchami.

Location
- Location: Santhoor
- State: Karnataka
- Country: India
- Interactive map of Santhoor Subramanya Temple

Santhoor Subramanya Temple is a Hindu temple located in the village of Santhoor near Padubidri, Karnataka. Here Kartikeya is worshipped as Subramanya, lord of all serpents. The main festivals celebrated here includes Shashti, Kiru Shashti and Nagara Panchami. During the Shashti Mahotsav Devotees in thousands come into the temple, early in the morning for having Darshan of God, offered special poojas and sought the blessing from God Subramanya for good health, wealth, prosperity and peace.
