= Mulk =

Mulk may refer to:

- Malik or Mulk, a Semitic term translating to "king"
- Mulk, Iran (disambiguation)
- Mulk (TV series), a 2003 Indian television drama series
- Mulk (film), a 2018 Indian Hindi-language drama film
- Mülk, a form of land tenure under the Ottoman Empire
- A person from Mulgimaa, a region in southern Estonia

== See also ==
- Mulki (disambiguation)
