= Kapu Assembly constituency =

Legislative Assembly constituency in Karnataka State, India

Coordinates: 13.23°N 74.74°E

Kapu
- Constituency No. 121 for the Karnataka Legislative Assembly

Constituency details
- Country: India
- Region: South India
- State: Karnataka
- District: Udupi
- Lok Sabha constituency: Udupi Chikmagalur
- Established: 1956
- Total electors: 189,007
- Reservation: None

Member of Legislative Assembly
- 16th Karnataka Legislative Assembly
- Incumbent Gurme Suresh Shetty
- Party: Bharatiya Janata Party
- Elected year: 2023
- Preceded by: Lalaji Mendon

Kapu Assembly constituency is one of the 224 Legislative Assembly constituencies of Karnataka in India.

It is part of Udupi district.

== Members of the Legislative Assembly ==
Election	Member	Party
1957	Pinto Denis. F. X	Indian National Congress
1962	B. Bhaskar Shetty	Praja Socialist Party
1967	B. Bhaskar Shetty	Praja Socialist Party
1972	B. Bhaskar Shetty	Indian National Congress
1978	B. Bhaskar Shetty	Indian National Congress
1983	Vasanth. V. Salian	Indian National Congress
1985	Vasanth. V. Salian	Indian National Congress
1989	Vasanth. V. Salian	Indian National Congress
1994	Vasanth. V. Salian	Indian National Congress
1999	Vasanth. V. Salian	Indian National Congress
2004	Lalaji Mendon	Bharatiya Janata Party
2008	Lalaji Mendon	Bharatiya Janata Party
2013	Vinay Kumar Sorake	Indian National Congress
2018	Lalaji Mendon	Bharatiya Janata Party
2023	Gurme Suresh Shetty	Bharatiya Janata Party

== Election results ==
=== Assembly Election 2023 ===
2023 Karnataka Legislative Assembly election : Kapu
Party	Candidate	Votes	%	±%
BJP	Gurme Suresh Shetty	80,559	53.23	▲0.69
INC	Vinay Kumar Sorake	67,555	44.63	▲0.34
SDPI	Mohammed Haneef	1,616	1.07	New
NOTA	None of the above	805	0.53	▼0.05
Margin of victory		13,004	8.59	▲0.34
Turnout		151,519	80.17	▲1.17
Total valid votes		151,355		
Registered electors		189,007		▲3.28
BJP hold		Swing	▲0.69	

=== Assembly Election 2018 ===
2018 Karnataka Legislative Assembly election : Kapu
Party	Candidate	Votes	%	±%
BJP	Lalaji Mendon	75,893	52.54	▲13.51
INC	Vinay Kumar Sorake	63,976	44.29	▲3.84
BJC	Anupama Shenoy	1,634	1.13	New
JD(S)	M. Mansoor Ibrahim	1,393	0.96	▼2.36
NOTA	None of the above	839	0.58	New
Margin of victory		11,917	8.25	▲6.83
Turnout		144,566	79.00	▲5.71
Total valid votes		144,448		
Registered electors		183,004		▲17.78
BJP gain from INC		Swing	▲12.09	

=== Assembly Election 2013 ===
2013 Karnataka Legislative Assembly election : Kapu
Party	Candidate	Votes	%	±%
INC	Vinay Kumar Sorake	52,782	40.45	▼5.16
BJP	Lalaji Mendon	50,927	39.03	▼7.56
JD(S)	Vasanth. V. Salian	4,327	3.32	▼0.07
SDPI	Abdul Hakeem	2,171	1.66	New
Independent	Srikantha. B. Acharya	1,174	0.90	New
Independent	Hameed	1,125	0.86	New
Margin of victory		1,855	1.42	▲0.44
Turnout		113,872	73.29	▲1.83
Total valid votes		130,474		
Registered electors		155,382		▲12.55
INC gain from BJP		Swing	▼6.14	

=== Assembly Election 2008 ===
2008 Karnataka Legislative Assembly election : Kapu
Party	Candidate	Votes	%	±%
BJP	Lalaji Mendon	45,961	46.59	▼0.13
INC	Vasanth. V. Salian	44,994	45.61	▲0.82
JD(S)	Leeladhara Shetty	3,341	3.39	▲1.12
Independent	Nagesh Rao	2,030	2.06	New
BSP	Stevan John Menezes	1,109	1.12	New
Independent	Gururaj Bhat Alias Surya	680	0.69	New
Margin of victory		967	0.98	▼0.95
Turnout		98,659	71.46	▲7.93
Total valid votes		98,653		
Registered electors		138,057		▲21.87
BJP hold		Swing	▼0.13	

=== Assembly Election 2004 ===
2004 Karnataka Legislative Assembly election : Kapu
Party	Candidate	Votes	%	±%
BJP	Lalaji Mendon	33,611	46.72	▲4.56
INC	Vasanth. V. Salian	32,221	44.79	▼2.70
Independent	Gladis Alimada	2,848	3.96	New
JD(S)	Mohammed Mhb	1,634	2.27	▼6.95
Kannada Nadu Party	Gopal. K. M	928	1.29	New
JP	Raj Ballal	703	0.98	New
Margin of victory		1,390	1.93	▼3.40
Turnout		71,965	63.53	▼0.77
Total valid votes		71,945		
Registered electors		113,281		▲7.42
BJP gain from INC		Swing	▼0.77	

=== Assembly Election 1999 ===
1999 Karnataka Legislative Assembly election : Kapu
Party	Candidate	Votes	%	±%
INC	Vasanth. V. Salian	31,151	47.49	▲19.71
BJP	Lalaji Mendon	27,653	42.16	▲16.93
JD(S)	Ivan D. Souza	6,046	9.22	New
Independent	Abdul Hameed	745	1.14	New
Margin of victory		3,498	5.33	▲2.78
Turnout		67,814	64.30	▼1.71
Total valid votes		65,595		
Rejected ballots		2,208	3.26	▲1.97
Registered electors		105,461		▲11.29
INC hold		Swing	▲19.71	

=== Assembly Election 1994 ===
1994 Karnataka Legislative Assembly election : Kapu
Party	Candidate	Votes	%	±%
INC	Vasanth. V. Salian	17,152	27.78	▼26.74
BJP	Lalaji. R. Memdon	15,578	25.23	▲20.77
JD	Ivan D. Souza	12,440	20.15	▼19.32
INC	Ashok. M. Suvarna	8,275	13.40	New
Independent	Leeladhara Shetty	7,818	12.66	New
Margin of victory		1,574	2.55	▼12.50
Turnout		62,557	66.01	▲6.81
Total valid votes		61,742		
Rejected ballots		810	1.29	▼3.59
Registered electors		94,765		▼2.45
INC hold		Swing	▼26.74	

=== Assembly Election 1989 ===
1989 Karnataka Legislative Assembly election : Kapu
Party	Candidate	Votes	%	±%
INC	Vasanth. V. Salian	29,823	54.52	▼2.86
JD	B. Bhaskar Shetty	21,593	39.47	New
BJP	Madhava Suvarna	2,437	4.46	▼1.10
JP	Karunakara Shetty	561	1.03	New
Margin of victory		8,230	15.05	▼24.52
Turnout		57,506	59.20	▼5.75
Total valid votes		54,701		
Rejected ballots		2,805	4.88	▲4.07
Registered electors		97,141		▲31.27
INC hold		Swing	▼2.86	

=== Assembly Election 1985 ===
1985 Karnataka Legislative Assembly election : Kapu
Party	Candidate	Votes	%	±%
INC	Vasanth. V. Salian	27,356	57.38	▲6.80
Independent	B. Bhaskar Shetty	8,494	17.82	New
JP	Dayanatha. K. Kotian	8,340	17.49	▲10.45
BJP	Gangadhara Suvarna	2,649	5.56	▼30.85
Independent	Krishnanada Shenoy	420	0.88	New
Margin of victory		18,862	39.57	▲25.40
Turnout		48,060	64.95	▼1.20
Total valid votes		47,672		
Rejected ballots		388	0.81	▼0.75
Registered electors		74,001		▲6.71
INC hold		Swing	▲6.80	

=== Assembly Election 1983 ===
1983 Karnataka Legislative Assembly election : Kapu
Party	Candidate	Votes	%	±%
INC	Vasanth. V. Salian	22,839	50.58	▲50.00
BJP	Gangadhara	16,442	36.41	New
JP	Sridhara. M. Kalmady	3,178	7.04	▼33.31
Independent	Janet Lobo	771	1.71	New
Independent	M. S. Abbas	738	1.63	New
IC(S)	B. Silver	430	0.95	New
Independent	Sanjeva. G. Karkera	429	0.95	New
Independent	K. Babu	329	0.73	New
Margin of victory		6,397	14.17	▼3.15
Turnout		45,870	66.15	▼8.99
Total valid votes		45,156		
Rejected ballots		714	1.56	▲0.23
Registered electors		69,345		▲2.13
INC gain from INC(I)		Swing	▼7.09	

=== Assembly Election 1978 ===
1978 Karnataka Legislative Assembly election : Kapu
Party	Candidate	Votes	%	±%
INC(I)	B. Bhaskar Shetty	29,030	57.67	New
JP	Dayanatha. K. Kotian	20,312	40.35	New
Independent	Bhogeesha Aitha Karkera	575	1.14	New
Margin of victory		8,718	17.32	▼11.78
Turnout		51,018	75.14	▲4.82
Total valid votes		50,341		
Rejected ballots		677	1.33	▲1.33
Registered electors		67,896		▲14.85
INC(I) gain from INC		Swing	▼4.59	

=== Assembly Election 1972 ===
1972 Mysore State Legislative Assembly election : Kapu
Party	Candidate	Votes	%	±%
INC	B. Bhaskar Shetty	25,358	62.26	▲24.69
Independent	K. Muddu Suvarna	13,504	33.16	New
Independent	Perody Vittal Shetty	1,183	2.90	New
SSP	M. S. Dayakara	514	1.26	New
Margin of victory		11,854	29.10	▲9.50
Turnout		41,573	70.32	▼4.11
Total valid votes		40,729		
Registered electors		59,116		▲13.49
INC gain from PSP		Swing	▲5.09	

=== Assembly Election 1967 ===
1967 Mysore State Legislative Assembly election : Kapu
Party	Candidate	Votes	%	±%
PSP	B. B. Shetty	20,956	57.17	▲8.40
INC	D. R. Heggade	13,771	37.57	▼10.55
SWA	J. M. L. Prabhu	1,928	5.26	New
Margin of victory		7,185	19.60	▲18.94
Turnout		38,771	74.43	▲16.25
Total valid votes		36,655		
Registered electors		52,088		▲3.51
PSP hold		Swing	▲8.40	

=== Assembly Election 1962 ===
1962 Mysore State Legislative Assembly election : Kapu
Party	Candidate	Votes	%	±%
PSP	B. Bhaskar Shetty	13,624	48.77	▲24.77
INC	F. X. D. Pinto	13,441	48.12	▼14.67
Independent	Mathais Charles Fernandes	870	3.11	New
Margin of victory		183	0.66	▼38.13
Turnout		29,278	58.18	▼1.94
Total valid votes		27,935		
Registered electors		50,322		▲1.25
PSP gain from INC		Swing	▼14.02	

=== Assembly Election 1957 ===
1957 Mysore State Legislative Assembly election : Kapu
Party	Candidate	Votes	%	±%
INC	Pinto Denis. F. X	18,761	62.79	New
PSP	Navinchandra. M	7,170	24.00	New
Independent	Ramachandra Rao Kunjoor	3,950	13.22	New
Margin of victory		11,591	38.79	
Turnout		29,881	60.12	
Total valid votes		29,881		
Registered electors		49,701		
INC win (new seat)				

== See also ==
- List of constituencies of the Karnataka Legislative Assembly
- Udupi district
