= Haleangadi =

- village
- Location in Karnataka, India Haleangadi (India)
- Coordinates: 13.046°N 74.776°E
- Country: India
- State: Karnataka
- District: Dakshina Kannada

Government
  - Type: grama panchayat

Population (2011)
  - Total: 4,563

Languages
  - Official: Kannada
- Time zone: UTC+5:30 (IST)
- PIN: 574146
- Telephone code: 0824 228
- Vehicle registration: ka 19
- Nearest city: Mangalore
- Lok Sabha constituency: Mangalore

Haleangadi or Haleangady is a village in Mangalore taluk of Dakshina Kannada district of Karnataka. It literally means "Old shop" in the Kannada language, although Byari, Tulu is local lingo. It is a junction on National Highway 66 which connects Cochin to Panvel. An adjacent road goes from NH-66 towards Pakshikere, Kinnigoli, and Kateel. There is also a road from Haleangady to Koluvail towards Arabian sea. This small town is situated in Dakshina Kannada district of Karnataka. It's about 24 km north of Mangalore city.
