= Doddikatta =

Doddikatta is a village near Bajpe in the Dakshina Kannada district of Karnataka, India. It is about 19 km (12 mi) from Mangalore, situated in a valley with panoramic views and greenery.

The village and its temple and is a holy shrine for Hindus.

Thousands of devotees visit Doddikatta every day to seek blessings from Shiva. Regular pujas are conducted three times a day in the temple and special pujas like Rudrabhisheka are conducted periodically.

Many devotees from all around the world visit the shrine to worship Shiva during the festival of Shivaratri.

The kshetra is unique for housing 32 kuladevatas and the ever-growing linga, which has grown for years with no carving or sculpting. In the interpretations of some priests, the thin vertical dividing line denotes Shiva and Parvati together.
