= Muchur =

Muchur is a small village in the Dakshina Kannada district of Karnataka, India. It is very close to Kateel and Nellitheertha. There is a very ancient temple of Lord Sri Durga Parameshwari at this place.
