= Tokur =

Tokur may refer to:

- Tokur, India, a village in India
- Tokur, Russia, an urban-type settlement in Amur Oblast, Russia
- A breed of pigeon — see List of pigeon breeds
