= Innanje railway station =

Railway station in Karnataka, India

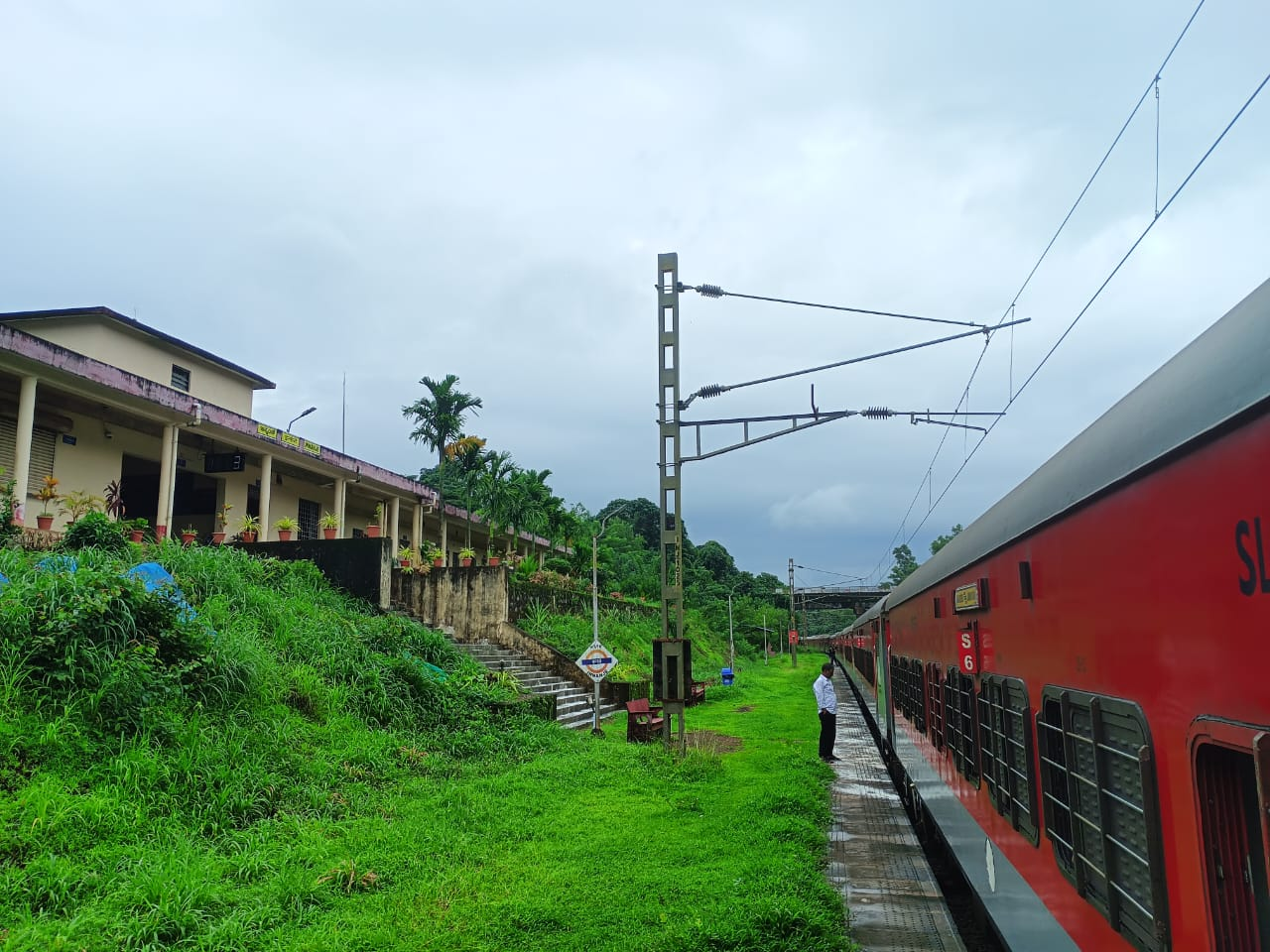

General information
- Coordinates: 13.2561°N 74.7618°E
- Owner: Indian Railways
- Line: Konkan Railway

Other information
- Status: Active
- Station code: INJ

Services
| Preceding station | Indian Railways | Following station |
|---|---|---|
| Udupi towards Roha | Konkan Railway Konkan Railway | Padubidri towards Thokur |
Route map
Location
- Location within Karnataka

Innanje railway station is a halt station on Konkan Railway. Innanje railway station lies in revenue district of Udupi, Karnataka state, India. The foundation stone was laid on 10 July 2016. The preceding station on the line is Udupi railway station and the next station is Padubidri railway station (on the way to Mangalore junction). The Innanje railway(railroad) station serves villages of Innanje, Pangala, Shankarapura, Bantakal, Mattu and others. Shankarapura village is famous for cultivation of Udupi Jasmine. Mattu village is famous for Mattu or Matti Gulla or Brinjal.

The Innanje railway station was built and is operated & maintained by Konkan Railway Corporation Limited a public sector company.
