= Koluvail =

- village
- Country: India
- State: Karnataka

Government
  - Body: Gram panchayat

Languages
  - Official: Kannada
- Time zone: UTC+5:30 (IST)
- ISO 3166 code: IN-KA
- Vehicle registration: KA
- Nearest city: Mangalore
- Website: karnataka.gov.in

Koluvail or Kolvail or Koluvailu is a village near Haleyangady of South Canara district of Karnataka state in India. It is located on banks of river Pavanje before entering Arabian Sea. The village is dotted with paddy fields and coconut gardens.
