= Karnad =

Karnad is an Indian name that may refer to the following notable people:

- Karnad Sadashiva Rao (1881–1937), Indian freedom fighter
- Bharat Karnad, Indian national security expert
- Girish Karnad (1938–2019), Indian actor, film director and writer
- Raghu Karnad, Indian journalist and writer
- V.G. Karnad (1925–2020), Indian classical flautist

== See also ==
- Rag Boli Karnad, a village in Iran
