= Dakkebali =

Dance of India

Dakkebali is a form of snake worship, also referred to as nagaradhane as well as worship of nature by Tulu people of Tulunadu. It is typically practiced in the Udupi district, Karnataka, India. The festival is held once every other year, alternating with the Paryaya festival at nearby Udupi. It is also held every year in Thantrady Bairy Bettu Udupi District Dakkebali (Bramha mandala). This pooja is performed for Naga, Bramha, Raktheshwari, Nandikonna, Haygulli, Kshetrapala, Bagilu Bobbarya, Motukalu Bobbarya, and Yakshi. This is Pancha Shaiva kshetra, and the current priest is Sri Nagaraja Bairy. At present Dakkebali will be performed every two years at Naga and Bramha by the Ramanna Bairy Family and devotees from nearby places.

== About Dakkebali ==
Dakkebali are the result of everyone present praying with intense Bhakthi (devotion), making intricate gifts to the Lord, dancing to music, deepas (light), drawing Mandalas, flowers, fruits, and pingara, and praying together.

The Vaidya family of the Udupi District is mostly in charge of producing Dakke Bali. The dakke instrument is played by Vaidyaas as an inherited skill. They live in Nalkoor, a neighbourhood in the Udupi region. Men dress in a way that represents Naaga Kannike. Naaga kannike is typically played by senior vaidyas. The Vaidyaas play dakke in their palms to call upon the spirits. They initially set up the dakke at the sacred location, pray, and play music over it until the local pathirs become possessed. During worship, they move sporadically due to this possession. It is referred to as Dakke Bali.

This motion represents the meeting of a male and female snake, and the number of spiral rounds has a count made up of twists known as mudi, or knots. As originally intended, they invoke the pathris, who are thought to be the male snakes that follow the nagakannike, by singing songs and portraying them in nartana manner. Up till they merge, it is mudi clockwise. Then the anticlockwise mudi represents the separation.

== Mandala ==
The intricate Mandala, which is a serpent-shaped design drawn in natural hues, is a key component of the decorating. Yellow (turmeric), crimson (turmeric with white lime), white (white mud), green (leaf powder), and black (roasted paddy husk) are the natural colours utilised.

This mandala depicts the divine union of male and female snakes and is drawn by the Panara community in the shape of a rectangle. Dakke Bali, along with Bhuta Kola, is one of the ritual dance forms practiced in Tulunadu. Together with Yakshagana, this region boasts a variety of folk dance forms.

== See also ==
- Paryaya
- Udupi
- Snake worship
