= Lalaji Mendon =

Indian politician

Lalaji Mendon is a member of legislative assembly (M.L.A.) of Karnataka state. He was elected from Kaup assembly constituency, which is a part of Udupi parliamentary constituency. He had won the elections held in 2004 and was re-elected in 2008. He belongs to the Bharatiya Janata Party. In the 2013 election, he lost to Congress leader Vinaya Kumar Sorake. However, in the 2018 election, he defeated Congress leader Vinaya Kumar Sorake and was re-elected.
