= B. A. Mohiddin =

Indian politician and community activist (1938–2018)

Personal details
- Born: 5 May 1938 Bajpe
- Died: 10 July 2008 (aged 70)
- Spouse: Khateeja (25 May 1962)
- Children: 2 Sons and 2 Daughters
- Parent(s): Abdul Khader (father), Haleema (mother)
- Education: B.Sc.
- Profession: Agriculturist & Industrialist

Bajpe Abdul Khader Mohiddin (5 May 1938 – 10 July 2018) was an Indian politician and community activist in the Beary Community. In 1978, he was elected as a member of the Legislative Assembly in India from the Bantwal constituency. Mohidin was also a Member of the Legislative Council from 1990 to 2002. Mohiddin was also the 'chief whip' in the Legislative Council from 1994 to 1995. He later went on to become the Minister for Higher Education and Industry, under Chief Minister J. H. Patel, from 1995 to 1999. In 2016, Mohiddin was recognized by the state government for his service with the Devaraj Urs award. He was also awarded 'Beary of the Century' by Beary's Welfare Association, Bangalore.

A biography of Mohiddin called Nannolagina Naanu was released on 20 July 2018 by the Chief minister of Karnataka, Siddaramaia. An English translation of Nannolagina Naanu "The I Within Me"was released on 1 May 2019.

== Early life and background ==
Mohiddin was born to Abdul Khader and Haleema on 5th May 1938 in Bajpe village of Mangalore taluk. He completed his Graduation in Science - B.Sc from 1959 to 1961 in Vijaya College, Bangalore.

== Personal life ==
B. A. Mohiddin married Khateeja on 25 May 1962. The couple has four children which includes two sons A K Mustaq, Asif Masood and two daughter Haleema Shahin, Fathima Sabeena.

== Political career ==
Mohiddin joined the Indian National Congress (INC) in 1969. He became General secretary of Youth Congress under D. B. Chandregowda, and then the General Secretary of Karnataka Pradesh Congress Committee under Devraj Urs in 1975, a position he served till 1980. In 1978, he contested the Assembly election from Bantval. After that, he was denied a party ticket to contest subsequent elections, and consequently, joined the Janata Dal party. In 2004, he rejoined the INC and was a member of the All India Congress Committee since 2007.

== Positions held ==
#	From	To	Position
	1969		General Secretary of Karnataka Pradesh Congress Committee.
	1975	1980	General Secretary of KPCC under Devraj Urs.
	1978	1983	M.L.A from Bantwal Constituency.
	1990	2002	Member of the Legislative Council: Government Chief Whip in Legislative Council (1994-1995).
	1994		Government Chief Whip, Legislative Council.
	1995	1999	Minister for Higher Education & Industry
	1996		Re-elected as M.L.C.: Appointed as Minister on 6 June 1996 for SSI.
	1999		Minister for Higher Education on (on 2 March 1999)
			Director, Consumer Federation of Karnataka for 6 years.

== Death ==
Mohiddin died on 10 July 2018. He was survived by his wife Khadeeja, his sons Abdul Khader Mushtaq and Asif Masood, and his daughters Halima Shahin and Fatima Sabina.
