= Kinnipadavu =

Village in Dakshina Kannada District, India

- Locality
- Nickname: K.P Nagar
- Location in Karnataka, India
- Coordinates: 12.976145°N 74.875623°E
- Country: India
- State: Karnataka
- District: Dakshina Kannada

Languages
  - Official: Tulu
- Time zone: UTC+5:30 (IST)
- PIN: 574142
- Telephone code: 0824
- Vehicle registration: KA-19
- Website: http://bajapetown.mrc.gov.in/

Kinnipadavu is a village located in the Mangalore taluk, Dakshina Kannada district, in Karnataka state, India. In Tulu Language Kinni Means Small and Padavu Means Village. it is 1 km from Bajpe.

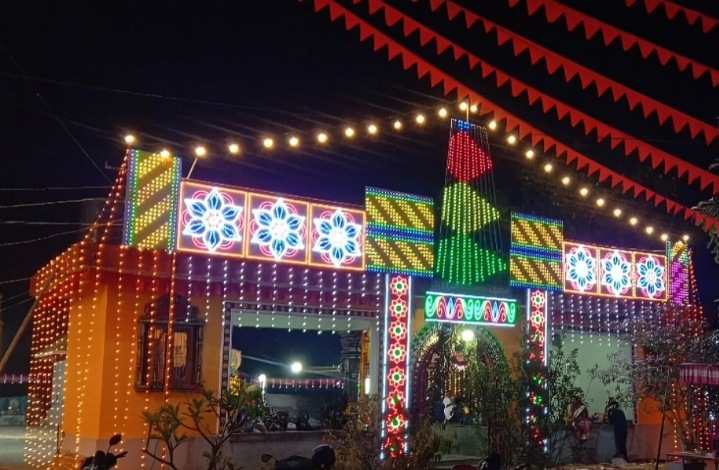
Bramha Mugera Mahakali Daivastana, Kinnipadavu

== Schools ==
- Kinnipadavu Anganavadi Kendra

== Religious institutions ==
=== Temple ===
- Shree Bramha Mugera Mahakaali Daivastana

=== Mosques ===
- Al-Huda Juma Masjid

== See also ==
- Bajpe
- Dakshina Kannada
