= Pompei College Aikala =

- Motto: A LIGHT UNTO MY PATH
- Type: Private Aided Institution
- Established: 1981
- Founder: Rev. Fr.Bernard L. D’Souza
- Affiliations: Mangalore University
- Principal: Dr.Purushothama K.V.
- Location: Kinnigoli, Mangalore, Karnataka, India
- Campus: Rural
- Website: https://www.pompeicollege.in

Pompei College located in at Aikala near Kinnigoli town, within India's Karnataka state, was founded by Rev. Fr.Bernard L. D’Souza in 1981. It is affiliated with Mangalore University. The college offers pre-university courses in science, commerce and arts. It also has primary school and high school.

== Courses ==
- B.A.
- B.Com
- BBM
- M.Com
