= Padubidri railway station =

Railway station in Karnataka, India

General information
- Coordinates: 13.1969°N 74.7680°E
- Owner: Indian Railways
- Line: Konkan Railway

Other information
- Status: Active
- Station code: PDD

Services
Preceding station	Indian Railways	Following station
Innanje towards Roha	Konkan Railway Konkan Railway	Nandikoor towards Thokur
Route map
Location
- Location within Karnataka

Padubidri railway station is a station on Konkan Railway. It is at a distance of 708.320 km (440.1 mi) down from origin. The preceding station on the line is Innanje railway station and the next station is Nandikoor railway station. Even though station is named Padubidri the station lies near to Paniyooru and Uchila of Udupi district in Karnataka state.
