= Gurme Suresh Shetty =

Indian politician (born 1963)

Gurme Suresh Shetty (born 1963) is an Indian politician from Karnataka. He is an MLA from Kapu Assembly constituency in Udupi district. He won the 2023 Karnataka Legislative Assembly election representing Bharatiya Janata Party.

== Early life and education ==
Shetty is from Kaup, Udupi district. His late father Prabhakar Shetty was a business man. He completed his Bachelor of Commerce degree in 1994 at Veerashaiva College, Bellary, which is affiliated with Gulbargha University.

== Career ==
Shetty won from Kapu Assembly constituency representing Bharatiya Janata Party in the 2023 Karnataka Legislative Assembly election. He polled 80,559 votes and defeated his nearest rival, Vinay Kumar Sorake of Indian National Congress, by a margin of 13,004 votes.
