= Concetta Hospital, Kinnigoli =

Geography
- Location: Kinnigoli, Dakshina Kannada District Karnataka, India
- Coordinates: 13.066052°N 74.852280°E

Services
- Beds: 65

History
- Opened: 1958

Links
- Lists: Hospitals in India

Concetta Hospital is a general hospital based in Kinnigoli, Dakshina Kannada District Karnataka, India.

Concetta Hospital, which was started in 1958 with just 12 beds has now grown into a large Hospital having 65 beds with modern equipment and medical facilities available for the patients of the rural area.

Sanjivini, an outreach unit of the hospital, provides a variety of health services to the poor and needy people of Kinnigoli and surrounding villages.

Services available at Concetta Hospital include:

- Out-patient service
- In-patient services
- Maternity service
- 24 hours emergency services
- X-Ray, ECG
- Clinical Laboratory
- Ultrasound Facility
- Treatment for snake bites
- Immunization
- Ambulance service

The following specialities and consultations are available:

- Gynaecology
- Paediatrics
- Orthopaedics
- General Medicine
- Surgery
- Dermatology
- Dentistry
- Physiotherapy
