= Pavanje =

- village
- Interactive map of Pavanje
- Country: India
- State: Karnataka
- District: Dakshina Kannada

Population (2011)
  - Total: 2,089

Languages
  - Official: Kannada
- Time zone: UTC+5:30 (IST)
- PIN: 574146
- Nearest city: Mangalore

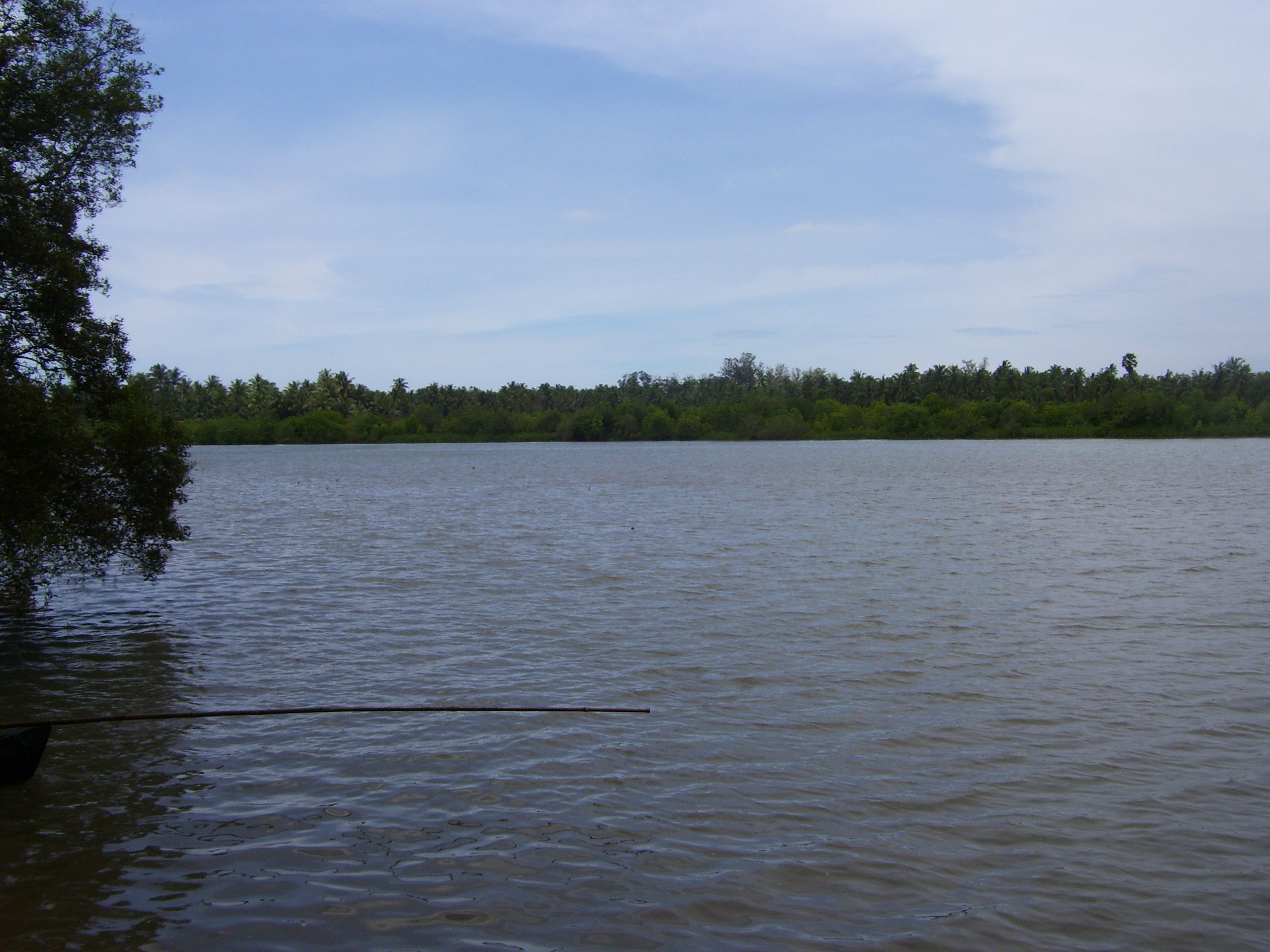
Pavanje River

Pavanje is a village in Dakshina Kannada district of Karnataka state, India. It is sited on the north bank of the Nandini River, adjoining National Highway 66 between Udupi and Mangaluru. It lies just outside of Mangaluru city and close to Mukka from where the Mangaluru city northern limits start. Pavanje bridge is the entrance to Mangaluru city from north. Pavanje lies to south of Haleangadi. The Arabian sea is on west of this village. The village has lush green paddy fields and coconut plantations.

The significance of this place is that it houses the entire family of Lord Shiva. The main temple is Mahalingeshwara temple of Lord Shiva. The Mahalingeshwara temple is on top of a small hill. On the bottom of the hill there is a temple of Mahadevi and also Shri Jnanashakthi Subrahmanyaswami Temple.
