= Mulki =

Mulki may refer to:

- Mulki, Armenia, a village
- Mulki, India, a town in Karnataka
- INS Mulki
- The native inhabitants of erstwhile Hyderabad State (See: Hyderabad State § Mulki)
- a local name of the Thali dialect of Pakistan
- Fawzi Mulki, Jordanian diplomat and politician
- Hani Mulki, Jordanian politician
- Mulki Sunder Ram Shetty, Indian banker

== See also ==
- Mulk (disambiguation)
- Mulkey (disambiguation)
