= Mulkey =

Mulkey is a surname. Notable people with the surname include:

- Frederick W. Mulkey, American politician from Oregon
- John H. Mulkey, American jurist from Illinois
- Kim Mulkey, American basketball coach
- William O. Mulkey, American politician from Alabama

== Other ==
- Mulkey (harbor vessel) patrolled Portland, Oregon, see Karl Prehn

== See also ==
- Mulki (disambiguation)
