= Paryaya =

Religious ritual in Udupi, Karnataka

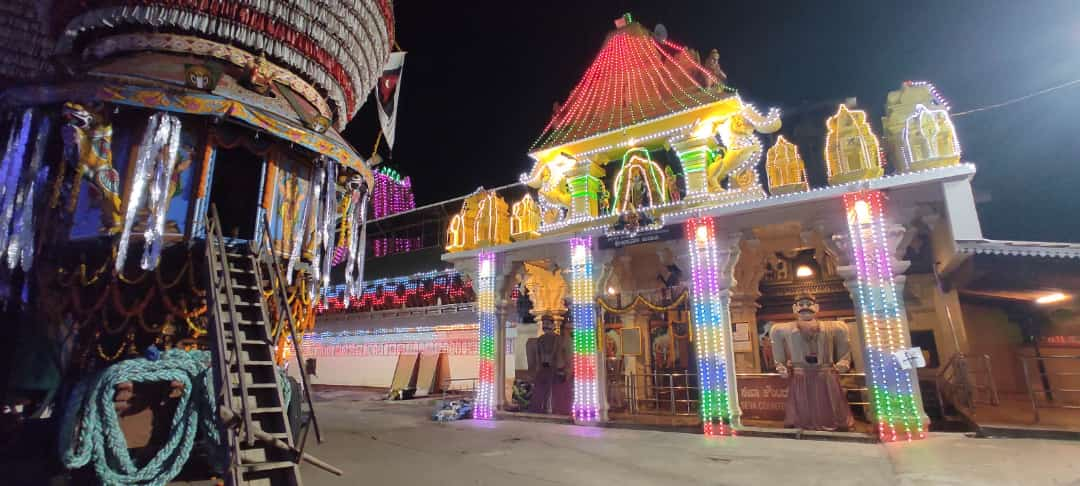
Sri Krishna Matha during Paryaya 2022

Paryaya is a religious ritual which takes place every alternate year in Sri Krishna Matha (Krishna Temple) of Udupi. The puja and administration of Krishna Matha is distributed among the Swamijis (seer or monk or pontiff) of Ashta Matha's established by Dvaita philosopher Sri Madhvacharya. Each swamiji of every matha gets chance to perform puja to Udupi Sri Krishna by rotation for a period of two years.

During paryaya, the puja and administration of Krishna Matha is handed over from Swamiji of one of Ashta Matha to the Swamiji of another Ashta Matha. It takes place every two years in even numbered years of Gregorian calendar. On 18 January 2014, the puja and administration was handed over to Kaniyoor Mutt's Vidhyavallabhatirtha Swamiji from Sodhe Mutt's Vishwavallabhatirtha Swamiji.

The paryaya takes place in the early hours of 18 January of even numbered year of Gregorian calendar at Udupi. The preparations starts from the previous year itself. The ascending Swamiji of Sarvajna peeta goes to a place called Dandathirtha near Kaup south of Udupi town and takes dip at holy pond and does puja as per Madhwa traditions. The ascending Swamiji taking over pooja of Lord krishna enters Udupi city at around 2.30 A.M. morning. A procession is taken from Jodukatte (Near old Taluk office) of Udupi town, where ascending Swamiji and other Swamijis are carried in palanquin along with cultural shows and plays. Previously, the procession started from Kinnimulki which was considered as southernmost tip of Udupi town then or entry point to Udupi town from South side. The Swamiji then enters Krishna Matha accompanied by outgoing Swamiji, where the reins of Krishna Matha are handed over formally. The hand over ceremony is held at Sarvajna peetha inside Krishna Matha. At this ceremony the descending Swamiji hands over articles like the Akshaya Patra, Sattuga and the shrine keys to ascending Swamiji. A formal durbar takes place in the Rajangana. There are many rituals which are followed as it was seven hundred years ago. A public ceremony is held at Rajagana within the premises of the Krishna Matha for benefit of general public.

== Baale Muhurtha, Akki Muhurta, Kattige Muhurta and Batha Muhuratha ==
Before ascending throne of Sarvajna peetha, rituals are initiated one year before paryaya by the ascending Swamiji. Main among them are Baale (Banana) Muhurtha, Akki (Rice) Muhurta, Kattige (Fire wood) Muhurtha and Batha (Paddy) Muhurta.

First, Baale Muhurta is performed, one year prior to the Paryaya by the ascending Swamiji. In Baale Muhurta, banana or plantain saplings are planted along with tulasi (Basil) to meet the needs to Krishna puja and for feeding of devotees. After that, Akki Muhurtha is performed, where rice is stored in Mudi (made from hay). Around 48 Mudis are stored on Akki Muhurtha. Kattige Muhurtha follows Akki Muhurtha. Firewood is stored in the form of ratha (Chariot/Temple car) for future use during Paryaya. The firewood stored is used for cooking prasada and feeding devotees who come to Krishna Matha during the two years of Paryaya. Batha Muhurtha is performed after Kattige Muhurtha. Batha (dried paddy) is stored for meeting future requirements within premises of Sri Krishna Matha. All these muhurthas are done on auspicious days with offering to Chandramouleeshwara, Ananteshwara and Sri Krishna deities. These are done for smooth running of the Paryaya. Nowadays these have become symbolic as Krishna matha ( Krishna mutt ) and other Ashta matha's ( Ashta mutt's ) have lost all their land holdings to tenants due to passage of Land reform act 1975 passed by Karnataka state legislature. The expenses to perform pooja's, run the temple, feed the devotees daily are borne by voluntary contributions of devotees in cash or kind. Many times loans are taken by respective matha (mutt) which is in charge of Krishna matha ( Krishna temple ) during paryaya period for meeting the expenses to run the Krishna matha at Udupi.

== Current Paryaya (from Year 2026) ==
- Shri Vedavardhana Teertha Swamiji, Pontiff of Shiroor Matha.

== Next Paryaya ==
- Sodhe Matha in 2028.

== Order of Paryaya ==
The rotation of the privilege of worshipping Lord Krishna amongst the eight mathas is fixed. The rotation starts with the Palimaru Matha and ends with the Pejavara Matha. The complete order is as follows

- Palimaru Matha
- Adamaru Matha
- Krishnapura Matha
- Puthige Matha
- Shiroor Matha
- Sodhe Matha
- Kaniyooru Matha
- Pejawara Matha

== List of Swamiji's who have conducted Paryaya since 2000 C.E. at Shri Krishna Matha, Udupi ==
Paryaya's held at Udupi from 2000 Circa
From the year	To the Year	Name of the Swamiji	Matha	Number of Paryaya
2000	2002	Shri Vishwesha Thirtha	Pejavara	Fourth time
2002	2004	Shri Vidyadeesha Thirtha	Palimar	
2004	2006	Shri Vishwapriya Thirtha	Adamaru	Second time
2006	2008	Shri Vidyasagara Thirtha	Krishnapura	Third time
2008	2010	Shri Sugunendra Thirtha	Puttige	Third time
2010	2012	Shri Lakshmivara Thirtha	Shiroor	
2012	2014	Shri Vishwavallabha Thirtha	Sode	First time
2014	2016	Shri Vidyavallabha Thirtha	Kaniyooru	
2016	2018	Shri Vishwesha Thirtha	Pejavara	Fifth time
2018	2020	Shri Vidyadeesha Thirtha	Palimar	
2020	2022	Shri Ishapriya Thirtha	Adamaru	First time
2022	2024	Shri Vidyasagara Thirtha	Krishnapura	Fourth time
2024	2026	Shri Sugunendra Thirtha	Puthige	Fourth time
2026	2028	Shri Vedavardhana Teertha	Shiroor	First time
