= V.G. Karnad =

Indian classical flautist (1925–2020)

V.G. Karnad (1925 - 7 September 2020) was an Indian classical flautist who plays the bansuri.

== Early life ==
He was born in 1925 in South Kannara, Karnataka, where bamboo grows abundantly. During his youth he played flute and harmonium.

== Career ==
He was influenced by P. Sanjivrao a renowned flutist of that time. He began to learn flute under Pannalal Ghosh the best known flutist of the 20th century. Like his guru Pannalal Ghosh, Karnad was also a staff artist at All India Radio. In 1960 and 1982 he performed in several European countries. Today Karnad is one of the most acclaimed flutists of India. He is one of the last flutists who learned under the legendary flutist Pannalal Ghosh. In 1986 he performed at a concert in Dhaka, Bangladesh in the honour of his guru. He also performed at the 100th birth anniversary of Pannalal Ghosh in 2011. Today he continues to perform at various festivals and in various cities of India.
