= Punaroor =

Punaroor Punaruru
- village
- Country: India
- State: Karnataka

Government
  - Body: Gram panchayat

Languages
  - Official: Tulu
- Time zone: UTC+5:30 (IST)
- ISO 3166 code: IN-KA
- Vehicle registration: KA
- Website: karnataka.gov.in

Punaroor is a village in the Dakshina Kannada district of Karnataka, India. Punarur can be reached from either from Suratkal or Mulky. The Vishwanatha Temple in Punaroor attracts thousands of devotees. There are marriage halls within the temple premises. Many marriages takes place here per Hindu tradition. Harikrishna Punaroor, a native of the village, has been president of the Kannada Sahitya Parishat.
