= Mulk, Iran =

Mulk in Iran may refer to:

- Malek Qozat
- Malek Talesh
