= Mulki railway station =

Railway station in Karnataka, India

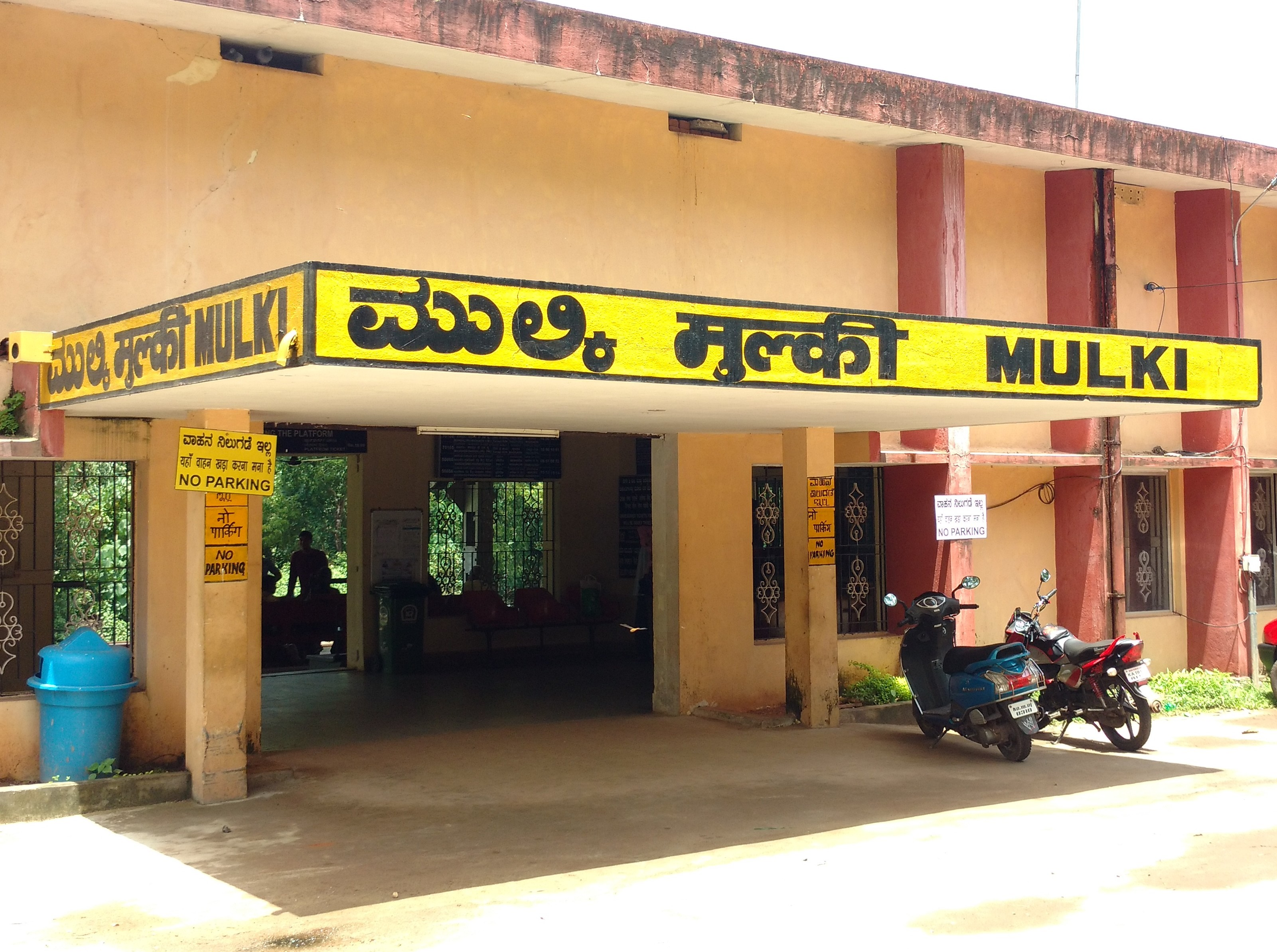

General information
- Coordinates: 13.0689°N 74.8053°E
- System: Indian Railways Station
- Owner: Indian Railways
- Line: Konkan Railway
- Platforms: 1 & 2(under-construction)
- Tracks: 3

Construction
- Parking: yes

Other information
- Status: Active
- Station code: MULK
- Fare zone: Konkan Railway

Services
Preceding station	Indian Railways	Following station
Nandikoor towards Roha	Konkan Railway Konkan Railway	Surathkal towards Thokur
Route map
Location
- Location within Karnataka

Mulki railway station (station code:MULK) is a station on Konkan Railway. It is situated 4.1 km (2.5 mi) away from Mulki, India town in Dakshina Kannada (D.K.) district of Karnataka state, Republic of India. It is also the northern most railway station of Dakshina Kannada district. It is at a distance of 724.800 km (450.4 mi) down from north most starting point Roha railway station and 13.200 km (8.2 mi) up from southern most ending point Thokur railway station of Konkan Railway jurisdiction. The preceding station on the northern direction is Nandikoor railway station and the next station on southern direction is Surathkal railway station.

The station features 1 active platform (with full platform roofing) and a 2nd platform which is under-construction. There is also a tea stall available in the station.

People can get down here for Mulki town and also visit the Bappanadu Shree Durga Parmeshwari Temple. People can also get down here if you would like to go to Kateel or Kateel Shree Durga Parmeshwari Temple, Kinnigoli, or Moodabidri towns as it is the nearest possible railway station for these towns. There are also bus facilities for Mulki and all these towns but should walk or take an auto to the bus stand which approximately 0.65 km (0.4 mi) from the railway station.
