= Padubidri =

- Town
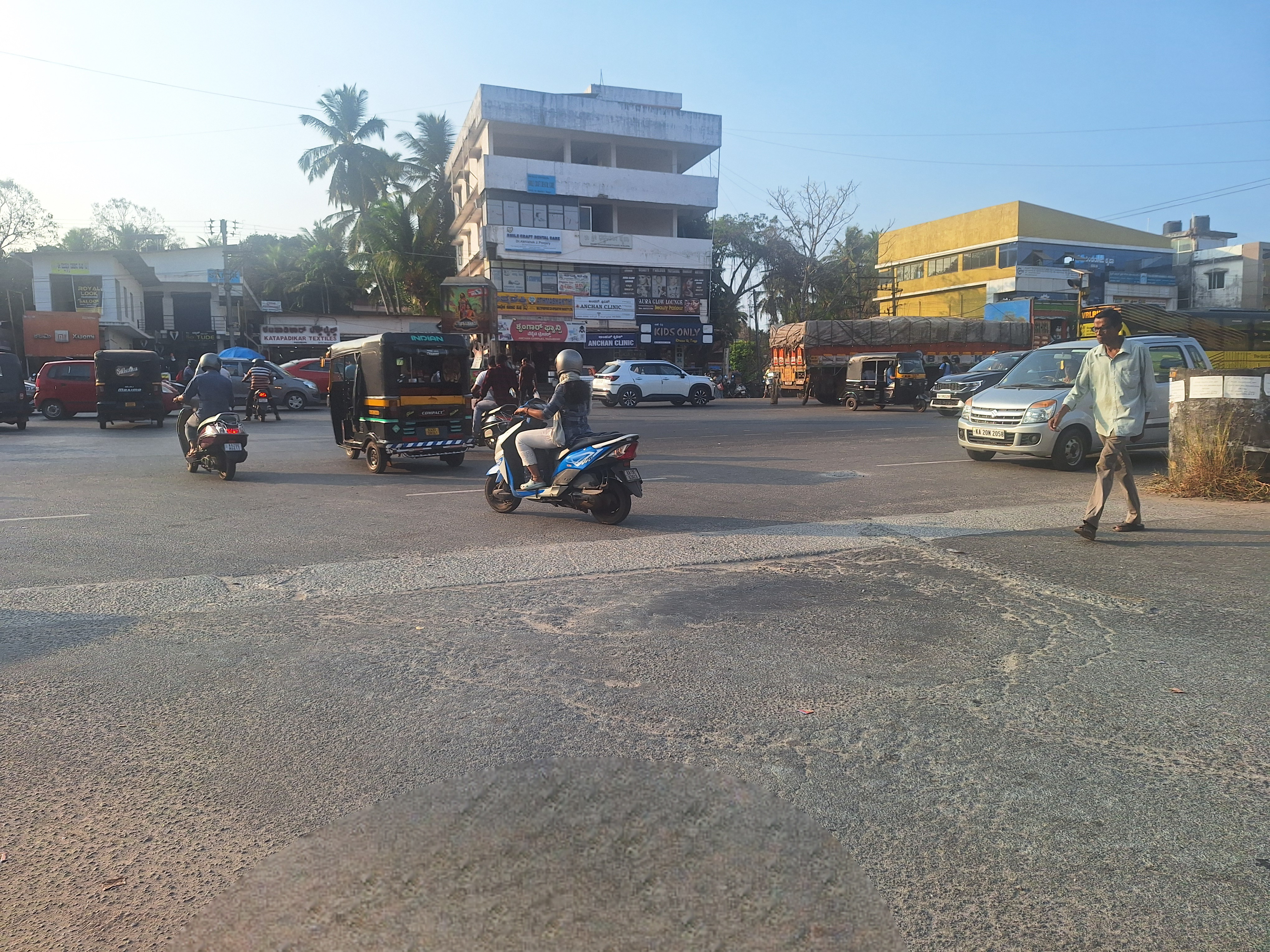
- Traffic in Padubidri NH 66 and State highway 1 intersection during evening time

- Location in Karnataka, India
- Coordinates: 13.1408°N 74.7721°E
- Country: India
- State: Karnataka
- District: Udupi
- Division: Mysuru
- Elevation: 39 m (128 ft)

Population (2011)
  - Total: 24,694

Languages
  - Official: Kannada,Tulu
  - Other Regional languages: Konkani,Beary
- Time zone: UTC+5:30 (IST)
- Postal code: 574111
- Vehicle registration: KA-20
- Lok Sabha constituency: Udupi Chikmagalur
- Member of Parliament, Lok Sabha: Kota Srinivas Poojary
- Vidhan Sabha constituency: Kapu
- MLA: Gurme Suresh Shetty
- Nearest cities: Udupi, Mangaluru

Padubidri /Padubidre (in Kannada) or Padubedre (in Tulu) is a town in the coastal district of Udupi in Karnataka state, India. It borders Mulki town in Dakshina Kannada District.

Padubidri is on the way from Udupi to Mangalore route. National Highway 66 (earlier known as NH 17) passes through Padubidri. Padubidri is famous for ritual Dakkebali, which is held every two years. This ritual is held in odd years 2025, 2027,2029 and so on. The Nandikoor thermal power plant also known as Udupi thermal power plant is nearby.

== Ethnicity ==
Padubidri has a large Tuluva ethnic group followed by Kannadiga, Konkanis, Beary and Urdu populations.

== Transportation ==
All express private buses ply to Padubidri from Mangalore to Udupi and Karkala, connecting the three major cities en route to Padubidri due to junction of major highway of NH 66 (towards Mangalore and Udupi) and KA SH 1(towards Karkala). The nearest airport is at Bajpe, which is a 45-minute drive away. There is a railway station called Padubidri located at Paniyoor on Konkan Railway route but it is far from Padubidre town, so Nandikoor is the nearest railway station for Padubidri Town.

== Proposed airport ==
There is a proposal to build an international airport at Tenka-Yermal near Padubidri. Mangalore Airport, which is just 45 km away, needs another airport as the airport cannot handle large aircraft due to its table-top runway and cannot be expanded. The proposal gained momentum in October 2025. In February 2026, the MP of Udupi-Chikmagalur Kota Srinivas Poojary along with local MLA of Kapu Assembly constituency Gurme Suresh Shetty met Ministry of Civil Aviation (India) Kinjarapu Ram Mohan Naidu and the ministry expressed readiness to support the project, subject to cooperation from the Karnataka government.

== Places of interest ==
- Mahalingeshwara Mahaganapathi Temple
- Padubidri Brahmasthana
- Muhiyuddin Jumma Masjid Padubidri
- Padubidri Bala Ganapathi Temple
- Sri Subramanya Temple, Santhuru
- Padubidri Blue Flag Beach
- Nandikoor Thermal Power Plant
- Sri Venkataramana Temple
