= Tokur, India =

Tokur, India Tokur, India
- village
- Location in Karnataka, India Tokur, India (India)
- Coordinates: 12°57′47″N 74°49′44″E
- Country: India
- State: Karnataka

Government
  - Type: Panchayati raj (India)
  - Body: Gram panchayat

Languages
  - Official: Kannada
- Time zone: UTC+5:30 (IST)

Tokur is a small village in coastal district Dakshina Kannada in Karnataka state, India. Tokur is between Mangalore and Udupi. Tokur Railway Station is the 58th station on Konkan Railway. Tokur is the main industrial area in Mangalore. Bajpe Airport is near Tokur. Panambur ship yard and petroleum production area is the main areas in Mangalore
