= Rag Boli Karnad =

Rag Boli Karnad رگ بلي كارند
- Village
- Country: Iran
- Province: Kohgiluyeh and Boyer-Ahmad
- County: Bahmai
- Bakhsh: Central
- Rural District: Bahmai-ye Garmsiri-ye Jonubi

Population (2006)
  - Total: 23
- Time zone: UTC+3:30 (IRST)
  - Summer (DST): UTC+4:30 (IRDT)

Rag Boli Karnad (Persian: رگ بلي كارند, also Romanized as Rag Bolī Kārnad) is a village in Bahmai-ye Garmsiri-ye Jonubi Rural District, in the Central District of Bahmai County, Kohgiluyeh and Boyer-Ahmad Province, Iran. As per the 2006 census, its population was 23 distributed among 5 families.
