= Kayk, Armenia =

Kayk Կայք
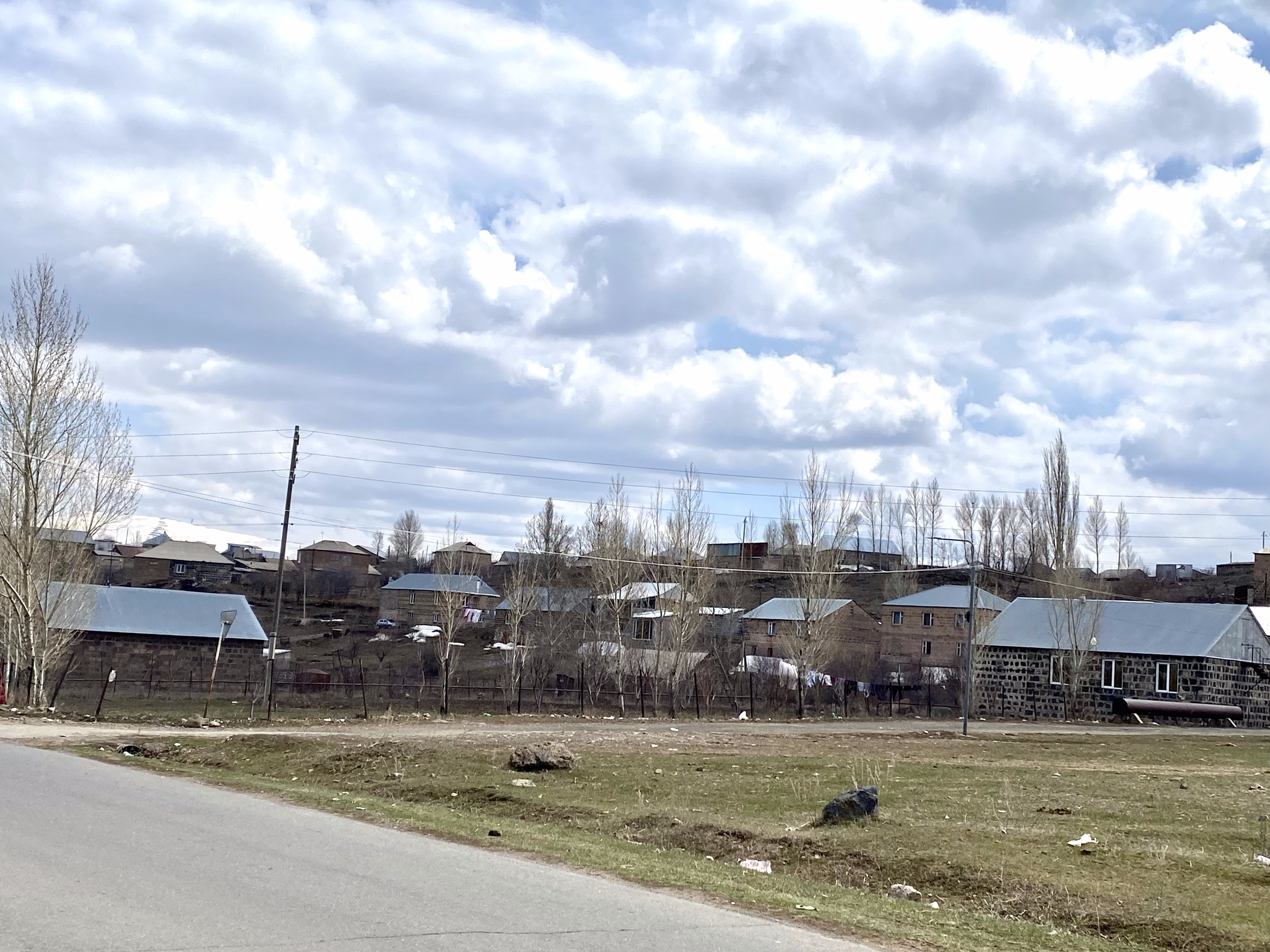
- Kayk, Aragatsotn Province

- Location within Armenia Location within Aragatsotn
- Coordinates: 40°35′11″N 44°22′17″E
- Country: Armenia
- Province: Aragatsotn
- Municipality: Aparan
- Elevation: 1,850 m (6,070 ft)

Population (2011)
  - Total: 441
- Time zone: UTC+4
  - Summer (DST): UTC+5

Kayk (Armenian: Կայք) is a village in the Aparan Municipality of the Aragatsotn Province of Armenia located 29 km away from Ashtarak 1850 meters above the sea level. The population migrated to Kayk during 1828-1929 from villages of Alashkert, Mush, Khoy, and Salmast regions. It was renamed Kayk in 2006.
