= Mulki, India =

Mulki
- Town
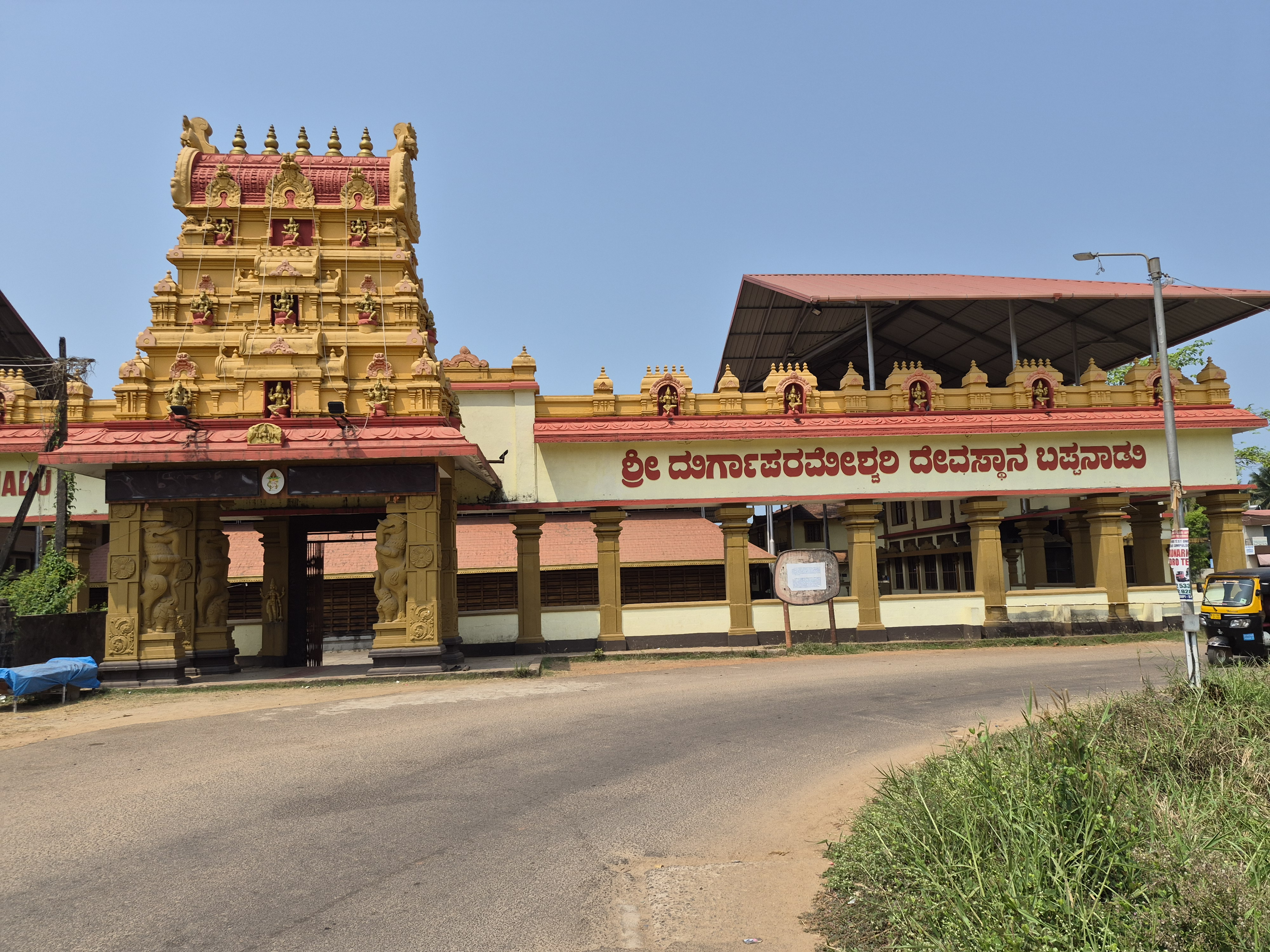

- Location in Karnataka, India Mulki (India)
- Coordinates: 13.1°N 74.8°E
- Country: India
- State: Karnataka
- District: Dakshina Kannada
- Region: Tulunaad (South Canara)

Government
  - Type: Town Panchayat
- Elevation: 7 m (23 ft)

Population (2011)
  - Total: 17,274

Languages
  - Official: Kannada,Tulu
  - Regional: Kannada, Tulu, Konkani, Beary
- Time zone: UTC+5:30 (IST)
- Postal code: 574154
- ISO 3166 code: IN-KA
- Vehicle registration: KA-19
- Nearest city: Mangaluru
- Lok Sabha constituency: Dakshina Kannada
- Vidhan Sabha constituency: Moodabidri
- Website: karnataka.gov.in

Mulki is a panchayat town located Mangaluru Taluk in Dakshina Kannada district in the Indian state of Karnataka. It is located on the Kanara coast.

== Etymology ==
According to local historians, the name Mulki is derived from the word for "herb," meaning medicinal plant, a term found in both Kannada and Tulu. The name Mulike is believed to have originated from the abundance of medicinal plants in the area. Over time, Mulike is said to have evolved into Mulke and subsequently into Mulki.

Historical accounts also suggest that the present-day settlement did not exist in its current form around 400 years ago, when the course of the Shambhavi River is believed to have flowed differently through the region.

== Geography ==
Mulki has an average elevation of 7 metres above sea level. It is located in the Kanara region of Karnataka, an area noted for its suitability for agriculture and industrial development. The town is situated at the confluence of the Shambhavi River and Arabian Sea.

It is situated approximately 10 kilometres north of Suratkal.

== History ==
Present-day Karnad was historically a riverside settlement. Accounts by foreign travellers indicate that, in 1623 AD, Karnad functioned as a trading centre on the banks of the river. According to the Italian travellers Barbosa (1516 AD) and Della Valle (1623 AD), the area corresponding to present-day Mulki was inundated during that period. Over time, changes in the course of the river led to the emergence of land on which Mulki later developed.

The Savant dynasty, which ruled the region from the 14th to the 18th century, initially established its capital at Elingje. The capital was later shifted successively to Seemanthoor and then to Padupanambur, where the royal family continues to reside. The book Mulkiya Savantaru, written by folk scholar Muddu Moodubelle, documents the history of Mulki and the Savant rulers.

Historically, the region was known as Volalanke (also spelled Olalanke), a name believed to refer to its geographical character as an "island within a river," as it was once surrounded by the Shambhavi River. Subsequent shifts in the river's course connected the area to the mainland. In the 16th century, the saint and poet Kanakadasa is believed to have visited the town and renamed it Mulki. The name is variously thought to be derived either from the Kannada word moolike (meaning "herb"), reflecting the area's vegetation, or from the Urdu word mulk (meaning "land").

Mulki is also home to the historic Sri Lakshmi Venkatesha Temple, a significant religious and cultural centre in the town. The temple, locally known as SLVT, is dedicated to Lord Venkatesha, a form of Vishnu. It attracts devotees from across the region and is associated with traditional rituals, festivals, and cultural activities.

== Demographics ==
As of 2011 India census, Mulki had a population of 17,274. Males constituted 48 per cent of the population and females 52 per cent. Mulki recorded an average literacy rate of 88 per cent, higher than the Karnataka state average of 75.3 per cent. Male literacy stood at 83 per cent, while female literacy was 76 per cent. Approximately 10 per cent of the population was under six years of age.

The majority of Mulki's population follows Hinduism, alongside sizeable Muslim and Christian communities. The Hindu population is socially diverse, with significant representation from communities such as the Billavas, Mogaveeras, Bunts, Goud Saraswats, and Tulu Brahmins.

Religions in Mulki (2011 census)
Religion	Per cent
Hinduism	74.73%
Islam	20.51%
Christianity	4.67%
Other or not stated	0.1%
Distribution of religions

== Economy ==
Skilled workers in Mulki are engaged in small-scale cottage industries and local businesses. Agriculture and fishing also make significant contributions to the local economy. The town has a fish market that serves as an important centre for the trade of locally caught fish.

== Tourism ==
Mulki has emerged as a notable surfing destination in India, offering relatively uncrowded beaches and favourable surf conditions from September to early June, with a break during the monsoon season.

Several surf clubs operate in the area, providing surfing lessons and board rentals, including Mantra Surf Club and Indica Surf Club. Many of these clubs also offer kayaking and stand-up paddleboarding in nearby estuaries. These facilities are primarily located at Sasihithlu Beach in Mulki.

== Temples ==
=== Bappanadu Sri Durga Parameshwari Temple ===
The Bappanadu Sri Durga Parameshwari Temple is dedicated to the goddess Durga, who is worshipped here in the form of a linga. According to local tradition, the temple was established several centuries ago by a Muslim trader named Bappa, who is believed to have discovered the linga submerged in water while engaged in trade in the area. The locality is said to have derived its name from Bappa.

In keeping with this tradition, the family of Bappa Byari continues to be honoured during temple rituals. During processions involving the utsava murti, the family is presented with prasada, and they customarily offer flowers and fruits to the deity. This practice is often cited as a symbol of long-standing communal harmony in the region.

The temple is situated adjacent to NH 66 on the route to Udupi.

=== Shri Venkataramana Temple ===
Mulki is home to the historic Shri Venkataramana Temple, which houses the idol of Shri Ugra Narasimha, a manifestation of the Hindu deity Vishnu. The idol is noted for its distinctive iconography, depicting Narasimha with eight arms and three eyes, standing on one leg. In religious tradition, this form symbolises the destruction of evil and the protection of devotees.

According to traditional accounts, the idol was consecrated in 1569 CE on the day of Margashira Poornima by Srimad Vijayeendra Thirtha Swamiji, a pontiff of the Kashi Math Samsthan. The idol is believed to have been discovered in present-day Kerala, either from a well along with other images or from an ancient site near Kochi known as Varahapuram. Some legends further associate the idol with the mythological devotee Prahlada, suggesting that it was later passed down to his grandson, King Bali.

The temple is regarded as one of the oldest temples in the region. It is traditionally said to have been established in 1260 CE by Shri Soira Vittal Bhat with the patronage of the local Jain ruler Savanth. The temple is an important religious centre for the Goud Saraswat Brahmin community and includes shrines dedicated to several deities, including Shri Venkataramana, Shri Bindu Madhava, and Shri Ugra Narasimha.

The temple continues to attract devotees from across the region. Worship of Shri Ugra Narasimha remains a central aspect of the temple's religious life, particularly during annual festivals and special rituals.

== Transportation ==
Mulki is located along NH 66 and State Highway 70. Express and private bus services operate regularly between Mangalore and Udupi, with Mulki serving as an intermediate stop. Bus services are also available from Mulki to nearby destinations such as Kateel, Kinnigoli, and Moodabidre.

The nearest airport is Mangalore International Airport at Bajpe, located approximately a 45-minute drive from the town. Mulki is a recognised stop for private express bus operators.

Mulki is served by the Mulki railway station at Karnad, which lies on the Konkan Railway line. It also serves nearby areas including Kinnigoli and Padubidre.

== Notable people ==
The following notable individuals were born in or have strong connections to Mulki:

- Suniel Shetty – actor
- Girish Karnad – actor, director, writer, playwright
- Mulki Sunder Ram Shetty – businessman and community leader
- Karnad Sadashiva Rao – freedom fighter
- Budhi Kunderan – cricketer
- Ammembal Subba Rao Pai – banker, educationist, and social reformer

== Educational institutions ==
The following educational institutions are located in Mulki:

- Vijaya First Grade College and Pre-University College, Mulki
- Sree Narayana Guru English Medium High School and Pre-University College
- Government Pre-University College and High School, Karnad, Mulki
- Medeline Pre-University College, Kilpady, Mulki
- Bethany English Medium School (ICSE), Kilpady, Mulki
- Dr. M. Ramanna Shetty Memorial English Medium School (CBSE), Mulki
- Shri Vyasa Maharshi Vidhyapeeta, Mulki
- Saint Anne's College of Nursing
- KPSK Memorial High School, Panjinadka
- CSI English Medium School, Karnad, Mulki
- MCT Public School, Kilpady, Mulki
- Mulki Ramakrishna Poonja Industrial Training Institute (ITI)
