= Innanje =

- Village
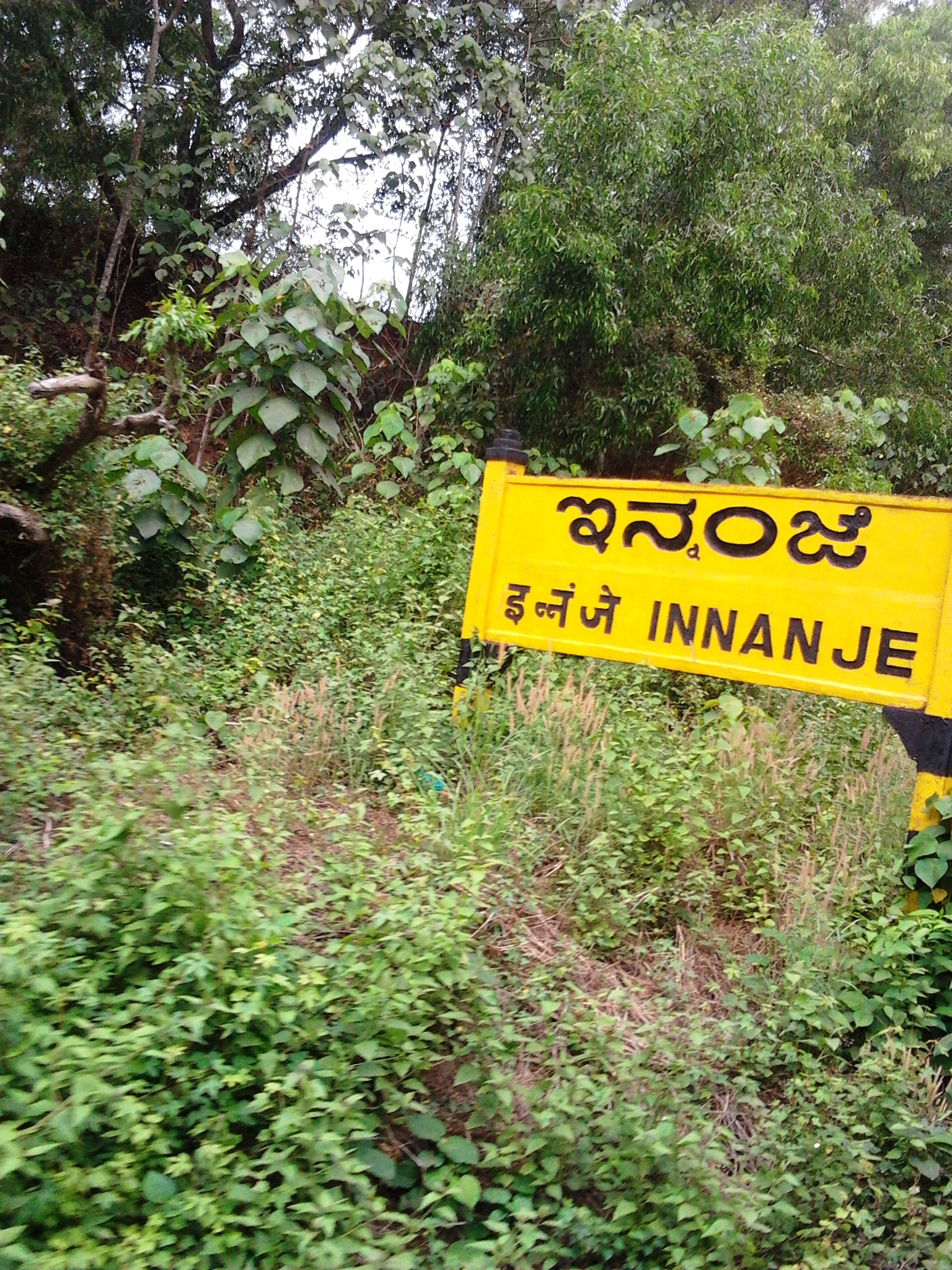

- Location in Karnataka, India Innanje (India)
- Coordinates: 13°14′49″N 74°46′9″E
- Country: India
- State: Karnataka
- District: Udupi

Government
  - Body: Gram panchayat

Languages: Tulu, Kannada Konkani, Hindi, English
  - Official: Kannada
- Time zone: UTC+5:30 (IST)
- PIN: 576122
- ISO 3166 code: IN-KA
- Vehicle registration: KA
- Website: karnataka.gov.in

Innanje is a gram panchayat village in Kaup taluk, in the Udupi district of Karnataka state, India. As of the 2011 Census of India, it had a population of 3,205, consisting of 1,433 males and 1,772 females.
