= Aikala =

- Village
- Country: India
- State: Karnataka
- District: Dakshina Kannada

Government
  - Body: Gram panchayat

Languages
  - Official: Kannada, Tulu
- Time zone: UTC+5:30 (IST)
- Postal code: 574141
- ISO 3166 code: IN-KA
- Vehicle registration: KA
- Nearest city: Mangalore, Kinnigoli
- Website: karnataka.gov.in

Aikala is a village near the town of Kinnigoli. It is situated in Mangalore taluk of Dakshina Kannada district. It is commonly known as Pompei in the Konkani language.

== Education ==
There is a college called Pompei College Aikala which offers courses in commerce and arts.

== Religious Places ==
The Kirem Church, which is officially known as Our Lady of Remedies Church is located in Aikala.

== Other Links ==
Pompei College, Aikala
