= Shambhavi River =

River in India

Coordinates: 13°04′20″N 74°46′39″E

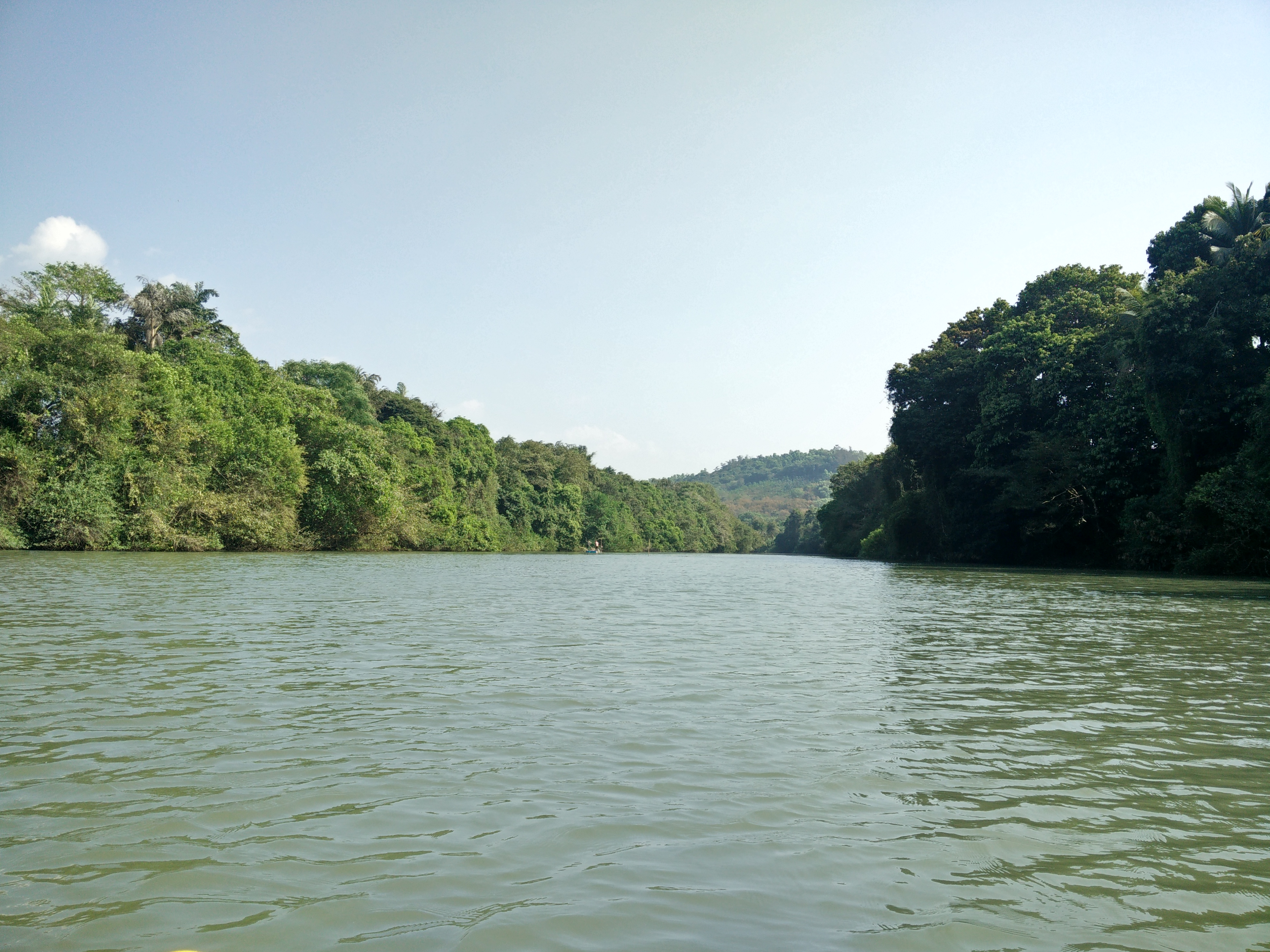
River Shambhavi near Palimar dam during March

The Shambhavi River has its origins at Kudremukh in Chikkamagaluru district of Karnataka, India. It merges with the Nandini River at Mulki, Karnataka before flowing to the Arabian Sea. This river is the main source of water to many villages nearby the river.

River Shambhavi is calm throughout the year except during Monsoon.

== Course ==
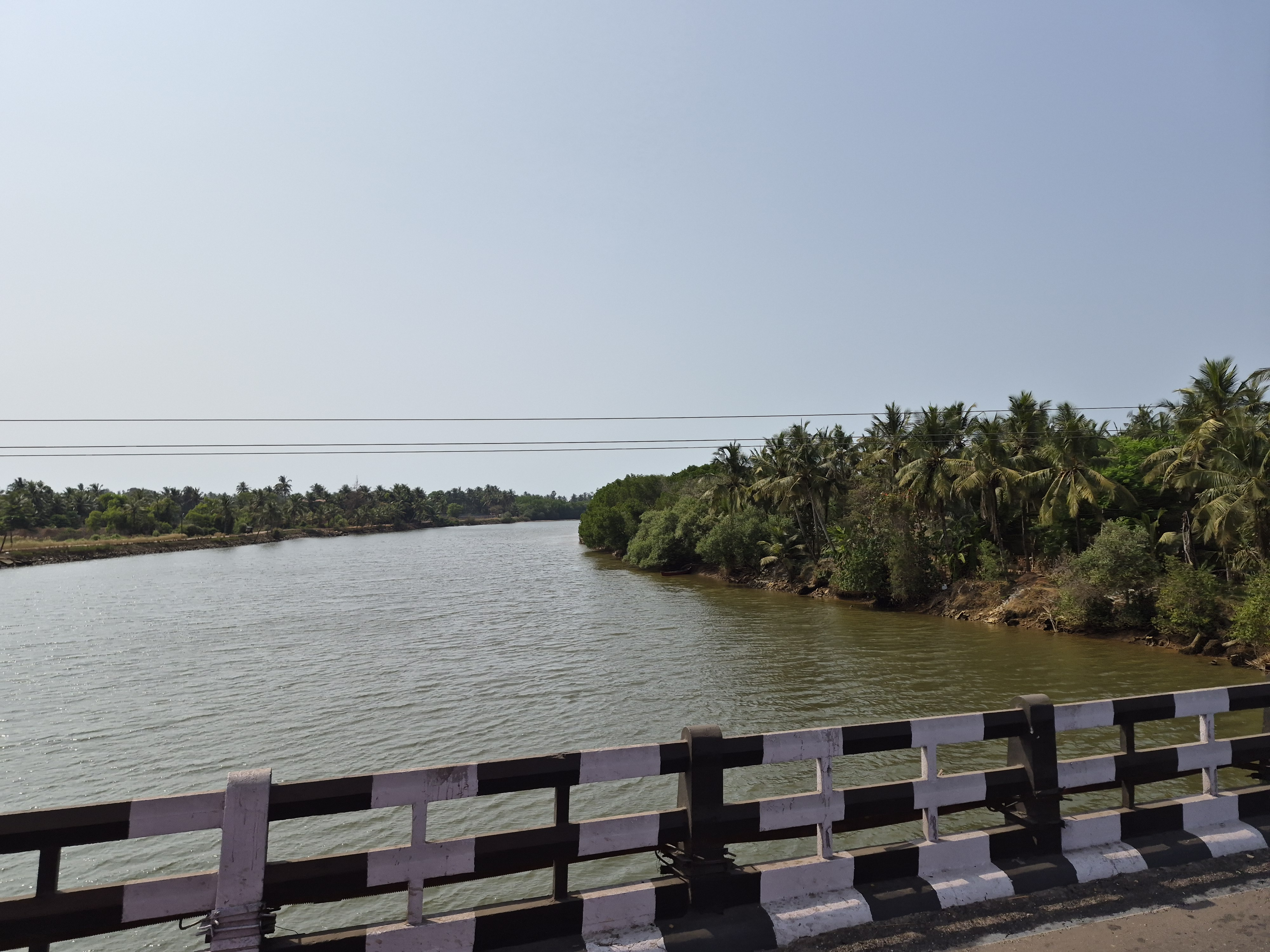
Shambhavi River from Palimar Bridge

River Shambhavi is a small river around 60 km in length. It flows from east to west. It flows through a locally famous waterfall called Parpappadi falls near Nitte. After Parpappadi falls it travels around 50 km to meet the Arabian sea. The water level of the river is checked using several small dams. Palimar dam is the last dam towards the west of the river.

== Water sports ==
River Shambhavi is famous for water sports in India. Several kinds of water sports events happen in river Shambhavi including kayaking, stand up paddle, wakeboarding, etc.

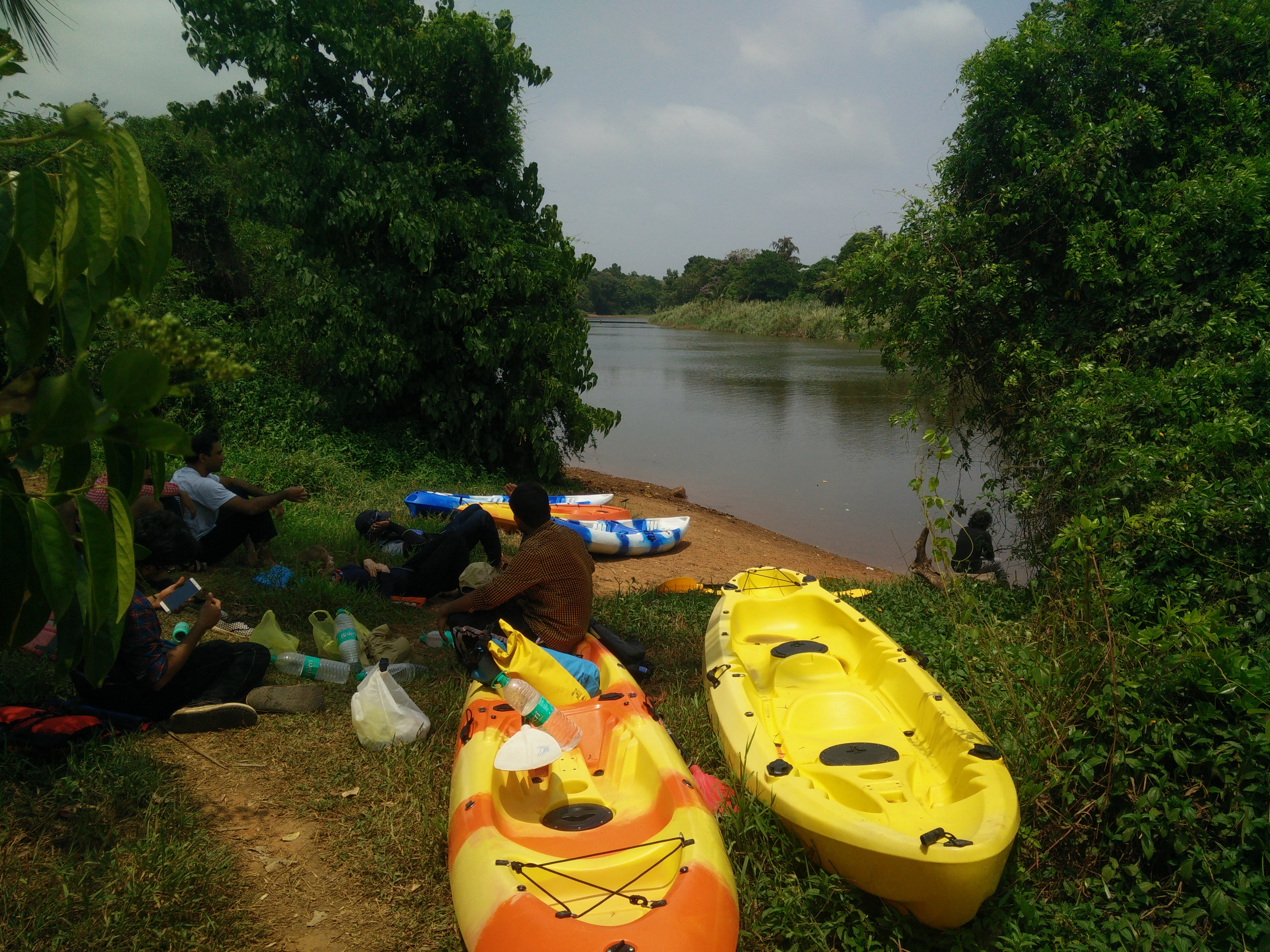
Kayakers taking rest near Palimar dam.

=== Kayaking ===
Recently long distance recreational kayaking events are organized in the river Shambhavi. People from the nearby cities of Karnataka and other state travel to Mulki to kayak in river Shambhavi. Kayaking event is usually spread across two days, where participants do 30–40 km of kayaking.

== Sand mining ==
Some local fishermen and mostly large scale sand mafia is involved in illegally mining sand from the river. Trucks and JCB is used to mine sand in some part of the river. The mining has affected the life of local by polluting the water. Sand in the river is important to filter the ground water and keep it fresh.

== Agriculture and fishing ==
The main occupation of the people who have settled on the bank of this river is agriculture and fishing. This river is the main source of water for agriculture during off monsoon. The river is rich in water life. People settling around the river have practiced fishing which provides bread to many families. People also trade fine sand which is used for construction. This sand is taken from the bed of the river.
