= Kinnigoli =

- Town
- Location in Karnataka, India
- Coordinates: 13.0631°N 74.8473°E
- Country: India
- State: Karnataka
- District: Dakshina Kannada

Government
  - Type: Town Panchayat

Population (2011)
  - Total: 19,557

Languages
  - Official: Tulu, Kannada, Konkani, Beary
- Time zone: UTC+5:30 (IST)
- PIN: 574150
- Telephone code: 0824
- Vehicle registration: KA-19
- Nearest city: Mangalore
- Literacy: 80%
- Lok Sabha constituency: Mangalore
- Vidhan Sabha constituency: Mulki-Moodabidri.
- Climate: Tropical (Köppen)
- MP: Capt. Brijesh Chowta
- MLA: Umanatha Kotian
- Website: http://www.kinnigolitown.mrc.gov.in/

Kinnigoli is a major suburb in the outskirts of Mangaluru International Airport Tehsil (Mangaluru International Airport Township). It is located approximately 32 km from Mangaluru, 5 km from Kateel (a famous Hindu pilgrimage centre), 8 km from Mulki (5 km from Mulki Railway station) and 17 km from the Mangaluru International Airport.

Kinnigoli is well connected by road with buses to all major cities and towns of the region. It is a central market place for surrounding villages like Mundkuru, Jarigekatte, Sankalakariya, Patte, Ellinje, Aikala, Kallamundkuru, Niddodi, Muchuru, Neerude, Kateel, Delantabettu, Shibaroor, Nadugoodu, Attur, Panja, Pakshikere, Shimantoor, Karnire, Kavathar and Balkunje, Palimar. A weekly market is held on every Thursday. Kinnigoli has got its own supermarkets equipped with fruits, vegetables, pulses, grains, frozen foods, juices, etc. Also there are many restaurants.

The majority of the people in Kinnigoli work in agriculture. Paddy is the widely grown crop and is mostly grown for consumption rather than sale. Cash crops like Areca nut and cashew are grown in small packets of agricultural land or on uncultivable hillocks. Mango, jackfruit and tamarind trees are scattered over the farm lands.

Kinnigoli is undergoing urbanisation and a real estate boom due to an influx of Indian expatriates returning to Kinnigoli (mostly from Persian Gulf countries). Kinnigoli has a hospital called Concetta Hospital which is run by the Bethany Sisters of the Little Flower, Mangalore.

In winter month, usually in January, buffalo racing competition called Kambala is held in the water filled, post harvest, rice fields named Kaanthabare-Boodabare Jodukare in Aikala, just about 3 km from Kinnigoli which attracts hordes of spectators including tourists. The competition attracts well fed and trained buffaloes from the twin districts of Dakshina Kannada and Udupi (formerly joint as South Canara), gold medallions along with cash prizes are awarded to the winners.

The other facet for which Kinnigoli is known for is its "Unity and diversity". Despite the presence of various religious groups like Hindus, Christians & Muslims and proliferations of Kanarese, Tulu, Konkani, and Beary languages, Kinnigoli has been free from any communal tension over the years. Each of the communities coexist very well and in some cases actively encourage and participate in the religious activities of the other.

Due to the fact that a sizeable number of Kinnigoli natives are Indian expatriates working abroad particularly in the Persian Gulf region, there has been a large influx of foreign remittances to the small town. So nowadays, one can find a large number of upscale mansions and bungalows along the roads leading in and out of Kinnigoli. However, despite the real estate boom, the ecosystem has been carefully preserved by taking care to see that trees are not destroyed and overall green cover remains untouched. As a result, the place still retains its green cover and eco friendly habitat.

The place has seen growth in terms of new apartment complexes, malls and other service segments over the years.

Ideal Ice Cream is an Indian ice cream manufacturer with a production facility located in Kinnigoli.

== Connectivity ==
=== Bus ===
Kinnigoli has good connectivity of bus services. The buses are running to Mangaluru, Mulki, Udupi, Bajpe, Kateel, Moodabidre, Belman, Nitte, Balkunje, Palimar, Padubidre, Karkala, Kaikamba, Polali, Bantwal, B.C.Road, Pakshikere, Surathkal, Shirva, Belthangadi etc.

=== Air ===
The nearest airport to Kinnigoli is Mangalore International Airport (IATA: IXE, ICAO: VOML) which is at a distance of around 17 km. Flights are available from here to all the major Indian metropolis like Bengaluru, Mumbai, Chennai, Delhi, Hyderabad and Middle East like Abu Dhabi, Bahrain, Dammam, Doha, Dubai–International, Kuwait, Muscat etc.

=== Railway ===
The nearest railway stations are Mulki railway station which is at distance of around 6 km and Surathkal railway station which is at distance of around 13 km .

== Notable people ==
- Srinidhi Ramesh Shetty - An actress and model who won the Miss Supranational title in 2016 and starred in the hit Kannada movie K.G.F: Chapter 1 & Chatpter 2.
- Devi Shetty -A famous heart surgeon and the founder of Narayana Health
- Mukhyaprana Kinnigoli -A famous Yakshagana comedy artist
- Dr. Indira Hegde - Acclaimed scholar, researcher, and author known for works like Buntaru ondu Samajo Samskrutiya Adhyayana. She has won the Karnataka Janapada Academy Award and Sahitya Academy Award.

== Educational Institutes In Kinnigoli ==
- Pompei College Aikala
- Sri Durgaparameshwari Temple First Grade College (SDPT)
- Shree Durgaparameshwari Temple Sanskrit College / PG Studies & Research Centre
- SDPT English Medium & Kannada Medium High School Kateel
- SDPT PU College Kateel
- Kict & Mctc Institute Of Technical & Computer Education
- Mulki Ramakrishna Punja Industrial Training Institute Thokur (MRPITI)
- M Ramanna Shetty Memorial English Medium High School, Skodi
- Pompei PU College Aikala
- Little Flower Composite PU College
- Rotary English Medium School ThygarajaNagar Moorukaveri
- Maryvale English Medium Primary & High School
- St.Lawrence Indian School (CBSE)
- Shimanthoor Sharada Model English High School (CBSE)
- St.Mary's Central School (CBSE)
- Morarji Desai Residential School Kammaje, Kinnigoli
- Govt. H.P.School Guthakadu
- Govt. H.P.School Padmanoor
- Bharath Maatha School Punaroor

== Banking & Financial organizations in Kinnigoli ==
- State Bank of India
- Axis Bank
- Canara Bank
- Bank of Baroda
- Union Bank of India
- Indian Overseas Bank
- HDFC Bank
- Federal Bank
- UCO Bank
- Karnataka Bank
- Mangalore Catholic Co-operative Bank
- S.C.D.C.C Bank
- St. Milagres Credit Souhardha Co-operative Ltd
- S K Goldsmith Industrial Co-Operative Society
- Kinnigoli Vyavasaya Seva Sahakari Bank
- Priyadarshini Co-operative society Ltd
- Kinnigoli Swarna Vividhoddesha Sahakari Sangha
- Muthoot Finance Gold Loan
- Shriram Finance Limited
- Mathrubhumi Souharda Sahakari ltd

== Temples ==
- Shree Durgaparameshwari Temple Kateel
- Sri Mahammayi Temple Moorukaveri, Kinnigoli
- Sri Mariyamma Temple Maaradka, Kinnigoli
- Sri Rama Mandira Kinnigoli
- Sri Mookambika Temple Shanthinagar, Kinnigoli
- Sri Mahalingeshwara Temple Elathuru, Kinnigoli
- Sri Adi Janardhana Temple Shimanthoor, Kinnigoli
- Sri Laxmi Janardhana Temple Elinje, Kinnigoli
- Sri Vishwanatha Temple Punaroor, Kinnigoli
- Sri Lakshmi Venkataramana Temple Talipady.
- Sri Durgaparameshwari Temple, Ulepady, Kinningoli.
- Sri Umamaheshwara Temple, Ulepady, Kinnigoli,
- Sri Adi Janardhana Temple, Elinje, Kinningoli
- Kantabare Budabare Janma and Karnika Kshetra, Guddesaana Ulepady, Kinningoli

== Churches ==
- Immaculate Conception Church Kinnigoli
- Our Lady of Remedies Church, Kirem, Kinnigoli
- St. Jacobs Church Kateel

== Mosques ==
- Mohiyuddin Jumma Masjid Kinnigoli
- Khiliriya Jumma Masjid Shanthinagar, Kinnigoli
- Jumma Masjid Punaroor, Kinnigoli
