= Nellitheertha Cave Temple =

Temple in India

- Nellitheertha Cave Temple entrance

Religion
- Affiliation: Hinduism
- District: Nellitheertha
- Deity: Shiva

Location
- Location: Nellitheertha
- State: Karnataka
- Country: India

Nellitheertha Cave Temple in Nellitheertha, Karnataka, India is dedicated to the Indian deity Somanatheshwara, or Shiva. The temple dates back to at least 1487 CE.

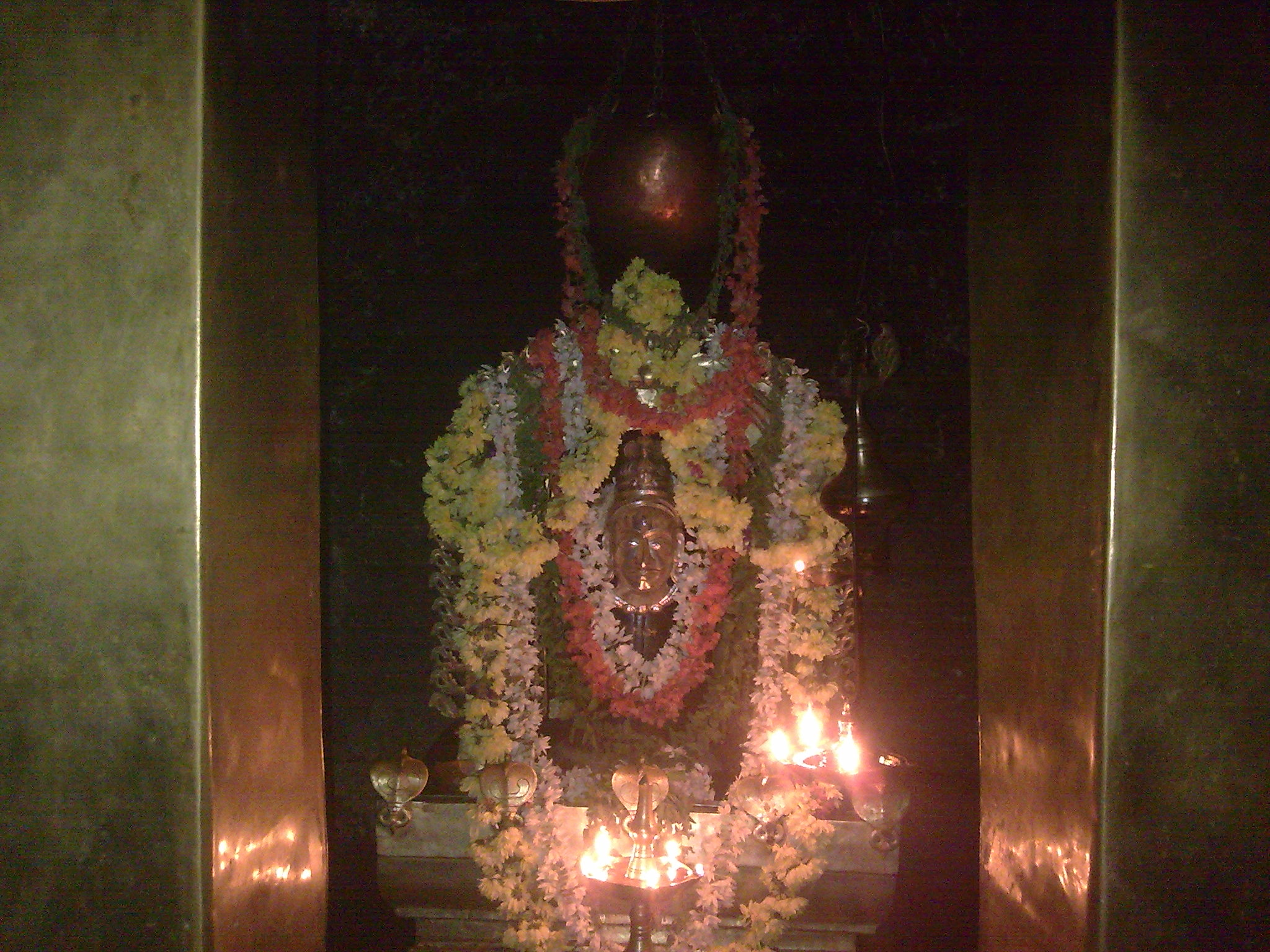
Lord Somanatha

To the right of the temple is a natural cave, about 200 metres (660 ft) long. Access is restricted, forcing visitors to crawl in on their knees. Inside, there is a lake and a Shiva Lingam.

== See also ==
- Indian rock-cut architecture
- List of India cave temples
