= Nandikoor railway station =

Railway station in Karnataka, India

Nandikoor

General information
- Coordinates: 13.1327°N 74.8061°E
- Owner: Indian Railways
- Line: Konkan Railway

Other information
- Status: Active
- Station code: NAND

Services
Preceding station	Indian Railways	Following station
Padubidri towards Roha	Konkan Railway Konkan Railway	Mulki towards Thokur
Route map
Location
- Location within Karnataka

Nandikoor railway station is a station on Konkan Railway and is situated in Udupi district of Karnataka state, India. It is at a distance of 700.450 km (435.2 mi) down from Roha north starting point of Konkan Railway Corporation Limited railway (rail road)route connecting Mumbai city to Mangaluru city . The preceding station on the north side is Padubidri railway station and the next station on the south side is Mulki railway station. Shree Durga Parameshwari Temple, Nandikur is to the west of this station. The siding railway line for Udupi thermal plant (UPCL) for transportation of coal starts and ends at Nandikoor railway station.
