= Vinay Kumar Sorake =

Indian politician

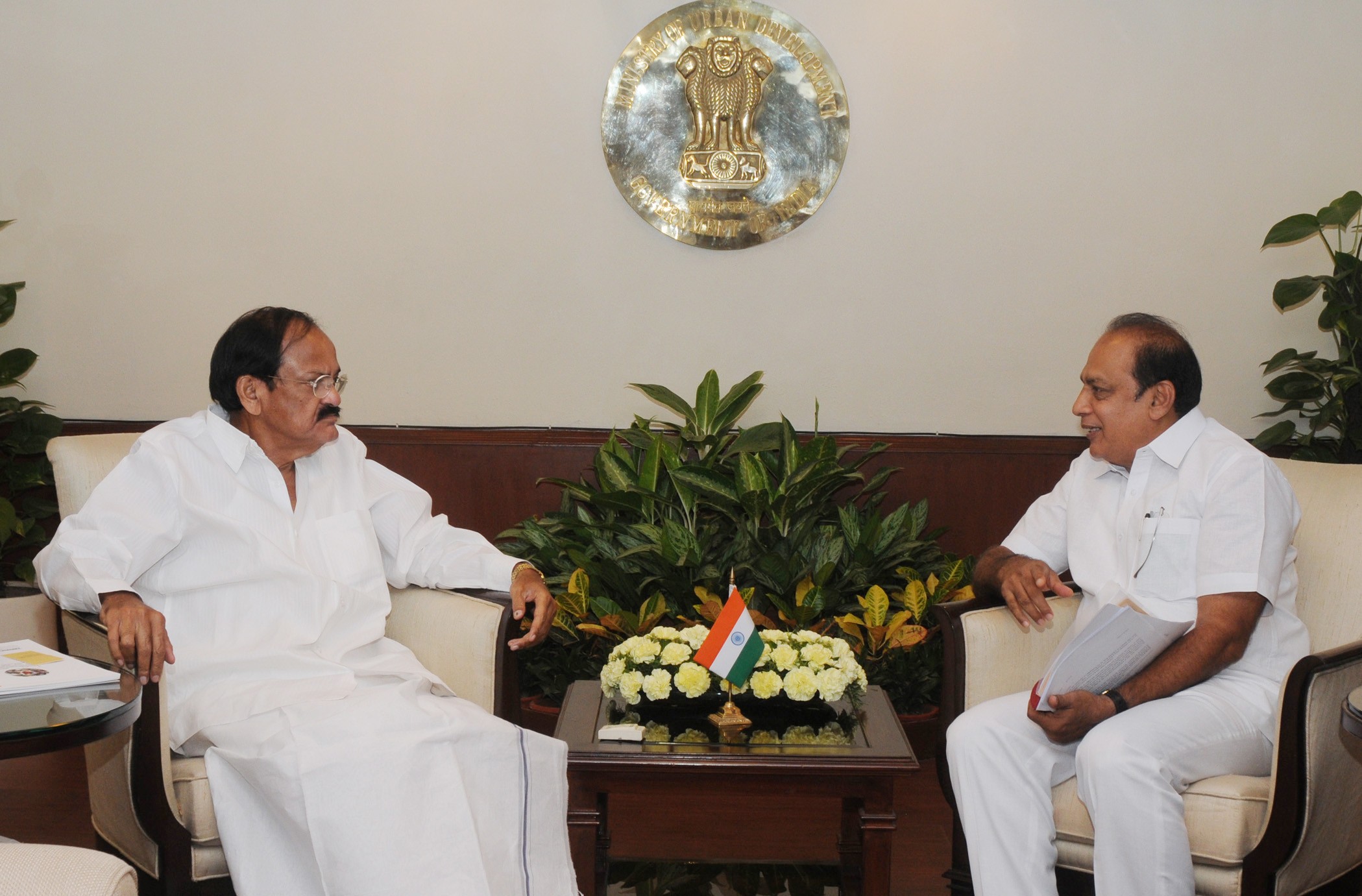

Vinay Kumar Sorake is an Indian politician of Indian National Congress. He represented the Udupi (Lok Sabha constituency) in Thirteenth Lok Sabha. He represented the Puttur constituency in the Karnataka Legislative Assembly from 1985 to 1994. He also won the 2013 Assembly election from Kapu. He was urban development minister in Government of Karnataka from 2013 to 2016.
