= Bajpe =

- Locality
- Bajpe
- Location in Karnataka, India
- Coordinates: 12.8904°N 74.8834°E
- Country: India
- State: Karnataka
- District: Dakshina Kannada
- Elevation: 80.83 m (265.2 ft)

Population (2011)
  - Total: 9,701

Languages
  - Official: Tulu
  - Regional: Kannada, Beary, Konkani
- Time zone: UTC+5:30 (IST)
- PIN: 574142
- Telephone code: 0824
- Vehicle registration: KA-19
- Website: http://bajapetown.mrc.gov.in/
- Namma Bajpe, Namma Bajape

Bajpe is a locality in Mangalore city of Dakshina Kannada district in the state of Karnataka, now also known as Bajpe Town, India. It is around 18 km (11 mi) from the city of Mangalore. The Mangalore International Airport is located at Bajpe and was previously known as the Bajpe Aerodrome. City bus number 47 connects Bajpe to State Bank. There are a number of villages surrounding Bajpe, for which it serves as a hub. The nearby villages to which Bajpe serves as hub are Permude, Hosabettu, Kinnigoli, Kalamundkur and Kateel. Bajpe is derived from the Tulu word, Bija da Appe (Mother of Seeds) since it was famous for its agricultural market in olden days.

Bajpe now its declared as a Town and official Known as Bajpe Town by Municipal Administration of Dakshina Kannada District.

== Demographics ==
As of 2001 India census, Bajpe had a population of 17,032. Males constitute 48 per cent of the population and females 52 per cent. Bajpe has an average literacy rate of 92 per cent, higher than the national average of 74.04; The male and female literacy rate are equal. 11 per cent of the population is under 6 years of age.

== Notable people ==
- B. A. Mohiddin-Ex - Minister for Higher Education
- Ranjith Bajpe Indian film director and screenwriter known for his work in Tulu cinema

== See also ==
- Permude
- Kinnipadavu
- Kateel
