= Palimar =

- Village
- Palimar Main Town Circle

- Location in Karnataka, India Palimar (India)
- Coordinates: 13.1270026°N 74.8154783°E
- Country: India
- State: Karnataka
- District: Udupi

Languages - Tulu
  - Official: Kannada
- Time zone: UTC+5:30 (IST)
- PIN: 574112
- Telephone code: 0820 2577
- Vehicle registration: KA 20
- Nearest city: Kinnigoli/Mulki / Padubidri
- Lok Sabha constituency: Udupi
- Vidhan Sabha constituency: Kaup
- Climate: Normal (Köppen)

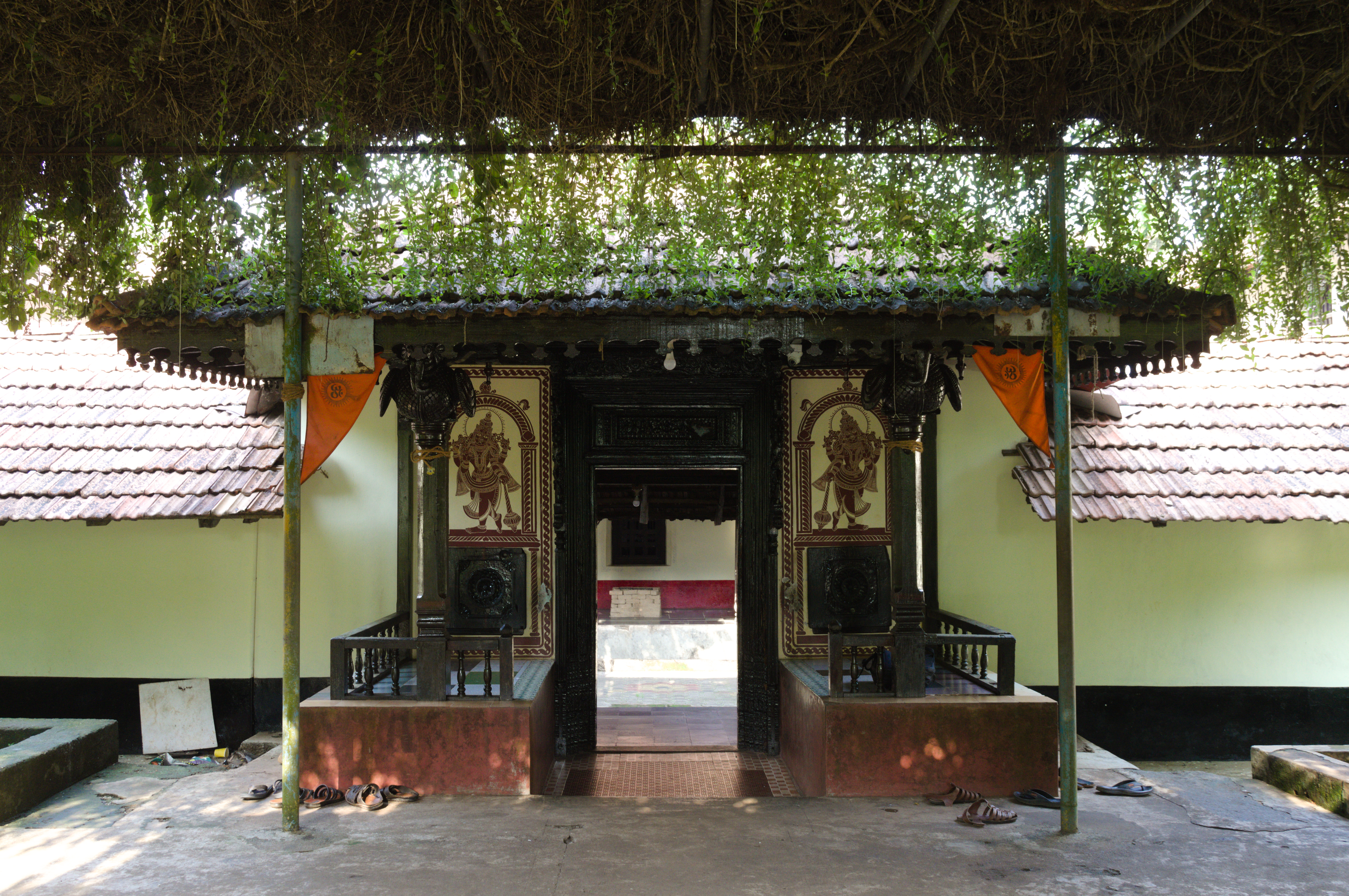
Entrance of Palimar Moola Matha

Palimar is a village and Grama Panchayat in the Udupi district of Karnataka state, India. Palimaru village is located on north banks of River Shambavi It houses Palimar Matha, one of the Ashta Mathas of Udupi founded by the Dvaita philosopher Madhvacharya.

== Pontiffs ==
2	Sri Hrishikesha Teertharu
3	Sri Samatmesha Teertharu
4	Sri Sambhava Teertharu
5	Sri Aparajita Teertharu
6	Sri Vidyamurthi Teertharu
7	Sri Rajarajeshwara Teertharu
8	Sri Srinidhi Teertharu
9	Sri Vidyesha Teertharu
10	Sri Srivallabha Teertharu
11	Sri Jagadbhushana Teertharu
12	Sri Ramachandra Teertharu
13	Sri Vidyanidhi Teertharu
14	Sri Suresha Teertharu
15	Sri Raghavendra Teertharu
16	Sri Raghunandana Teertharu
17	Sri Vidyapati Teertharu
18	Sri Raghupati Teertharu
19	Sri Raghunatha Teertharu
20	Sri Raghuttama Teertharu
21	Sri Ramabhadra Teertharu
22	Sri Raghuvarya Teertharu
23	Sri Raghupungava Teertharu
24	Sri Raghuvara Teertharu
25	Sri Raghupraveera Teertharu
26	Sri Raghubhushana Teertharu
27	Sri Raghuratna Teertharu
28	Sri Raghupriya Teertharu
29	Sri Raghumanya Teertharu
30	Sri Vidyamanya Teertharu
31	Sri Vidyadheesha Teertharu(Present Pontiff)
32	Sri Vidyarajeshwara Teertharu( Successor )
