= Kateel =

Kateel Kateelu
- town
- Location in Karnataka, India
- Coordinates: 13.0438238°N 74.8701417°E
- Country: India
- State: Karnataka
- District: Dakshina Kannada

Government
  - Type: Town Panchayat
  - Body: Kinnigoli

Languages
  - Official: Tulu, Kannada
- Time zone: UTC+5:30 (IST)
- Postal code: 574148
- Taluk: Mangalore
- Lok Sabha constituency: Mangalore
- Vidhan Sabha constituency: Moodabidre
- Lok Sabha representative: Capt.Brijesh Chowta
- Vidhan Sabha constituency: Umanatha A Kotian
- Website: http://www.kinnigolitown.mrc.gov.in/

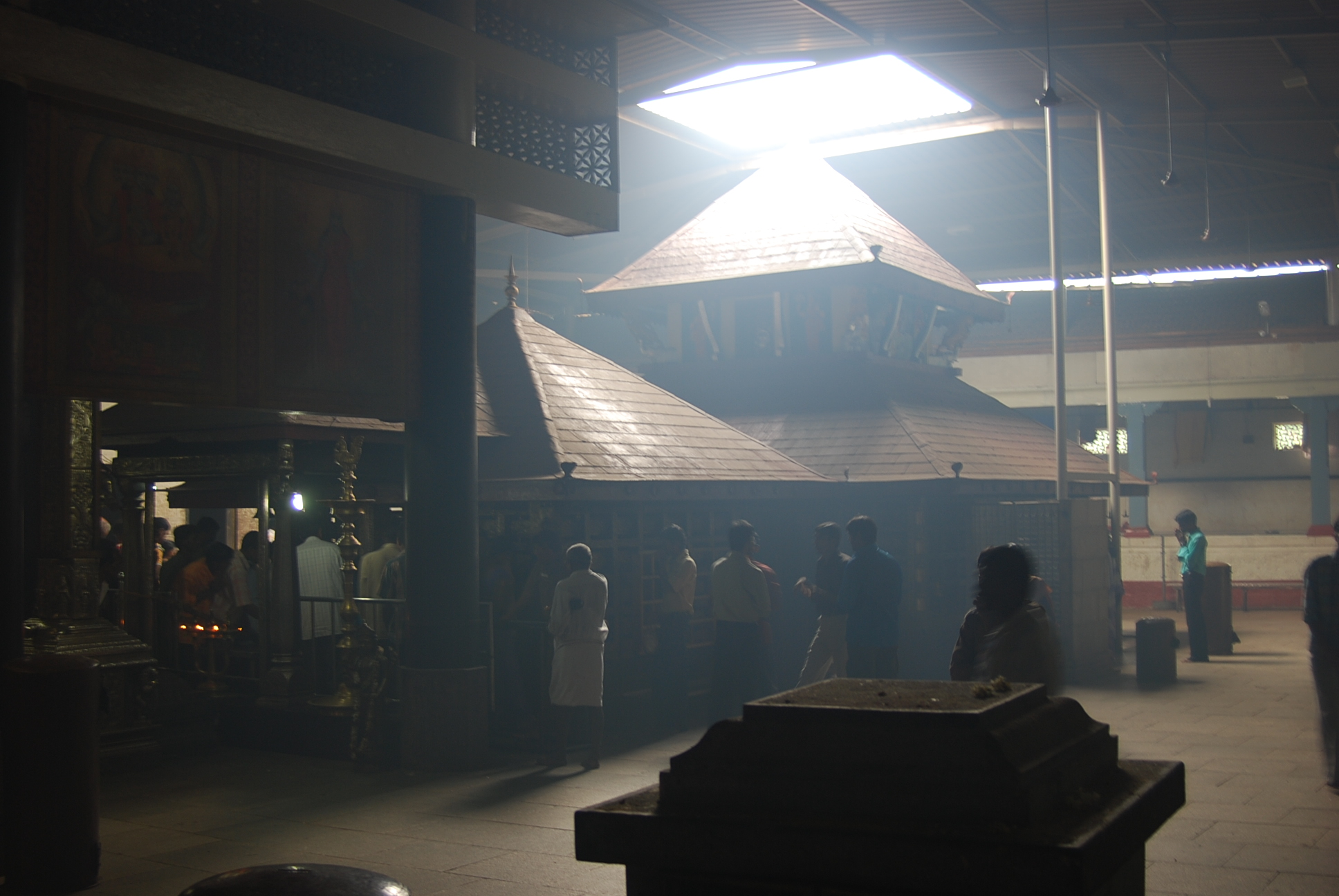
Kateelu Durga Parameshwari Temple

Kateel or Kateelu is a temple town in the Dakshina Kannada district of the Indian state of Karnataka. It is considered one of the holiest Hindu temple towns in India. It is situated on the banks of the river Nandini.

== Geography ==
It is about 20.6 kilometers away from Mangalore. Kateel locates on the way to Udupi. Between Kinnigoli and Mangalore International Airport

== Etymology ==
In Tulu, 'Kati' means 'center'. Kateel is midway between Kanakagiri, the source of the river, and Pavanje, where the river joins the sea. 'Ila' means area (land), thus the place is called 'Kati + lla', Kateel.

== Transport ==
The nearest airport is Mangalore International Airport, 16 kilometers away. The nearest railway station is Mangalore, 18.8 kilometers away. Kateel is well connected by public transport to nearby religious places such as Udupi, Subrahmanya and Dharmasthala.

== Shri Durga Parameshwari Temple ==
The town hosts the temple of Sri Durga Parameshwari. The temple is situated on an islet in the middle of the sacred river Nandini amidst panoramic scenes and fascinating greenery. Thousands of devotees visit Kateel every day to seek blessings from goddess Durga Parameshwari.

== Education institutions ==
Kateelu is known for its quality education institutions. All the institutions owned by Shri Kateelu Durga Parameshwari Temple. Well known are Sri Durgaparameshwari Temple First Grade College, Kateel, Sri Durga Sanskrit PG Studies & Research Centre, Kateel,

== Yakshagana Mela ==
Kateelu is very famous for tenkutittu Yakshagana and attached to traditional importance to this holy place. Kateelu temple has 6 Melas (Troupes) Devotees of Hindu belief get Yakshagana played through any of the Melas at their place.
