= Kaikamba =

- Town Sub-Urban
- Nickname: Town of unity
- Location in Karnataka, India Kaikamba (India)
- Coordinates: 12.9607°N 74.9332°E
- Country: India
- State: Karnataka
- District: Dakshina Kannada
- Named for: Hand pole

Government
  - Type: Panchayat
  - Body: Paduperar Panchayat, Kandavara Panchayat, Ganjimutt Panchayat, Gurupura Panchayat

Population (2017)
  - Total: 17,562

Languages
  - Official: Kannada
- Time zone: UTC+5:30 (IST)
- PIN: Kinnikambla 574 151
- Telephone code: 0824
- Vehicle registration: KA 19

Kaikamba also known as Gurupura Kaikamba is a suburban town of Mangalore, Dakshina Kannada District, Karnataka State, west coast of India. Kaikamba lies between Moodabidri and Mangalore city in Dakshina Kannada district. This town lies on Mangalore – Moodabidri Highway National Highway 169 (Old No. NH 13). Kaikamba is 12 km away from Mangalore city. Also 5 to 6 km away from Bajpe town. where Mangalore International Airport is located. Distance from Airport to Kaikamba is just 8 km. Population of Kaikamba is about 15,325 as per 2009 census. Parts of Kaikamba are administered by Paduperar Panchayat, Kandavara Panchayat and Ganjimutt Panchayat. Efforts are being made to include this town into Mangalore city corporation limits by the year 2015. The proposed KIADB Software export promotional park is 3 km away.

The geographical location of guide-pole at Kaikamba is exactly 12.9607° North and 74.9332° East and it is situated approximately 100 metres above sea level. It also a place of 2 church 3 mosques and 3 temples.

== Media ==
- The online news portal of Kaikamba town is Suddi9

== Etymology ==
The word "Kaikamba" means "hand-post" or "guide-pole" in both Kannada and Tulu languages. The word is used mostly for junctions of roads in Tulunadu as in olden days a wooden pole was fixed in the middle of the junction indicating direction of places. This small junction town - linking a three-way road network that lead to Bajpe, Mangalore and Moodabidri – has a hand-post guiding tourists and visitors.

== Commerce and industries ==
Mangalore tile factories are few in numbers. There are also beedi works, cashew nut industries and rice processing industries, as well as a number of commercial farming setup surrounding kaikamba poultry farms, areca nut plantation, coconut plantation, pepper plantation, cashew plantations and paddy cultivation. Real estate business is another major commercial area. The proposed Ganjimutt SEZ is just 3.5 km away from this location.

== People and culture ==
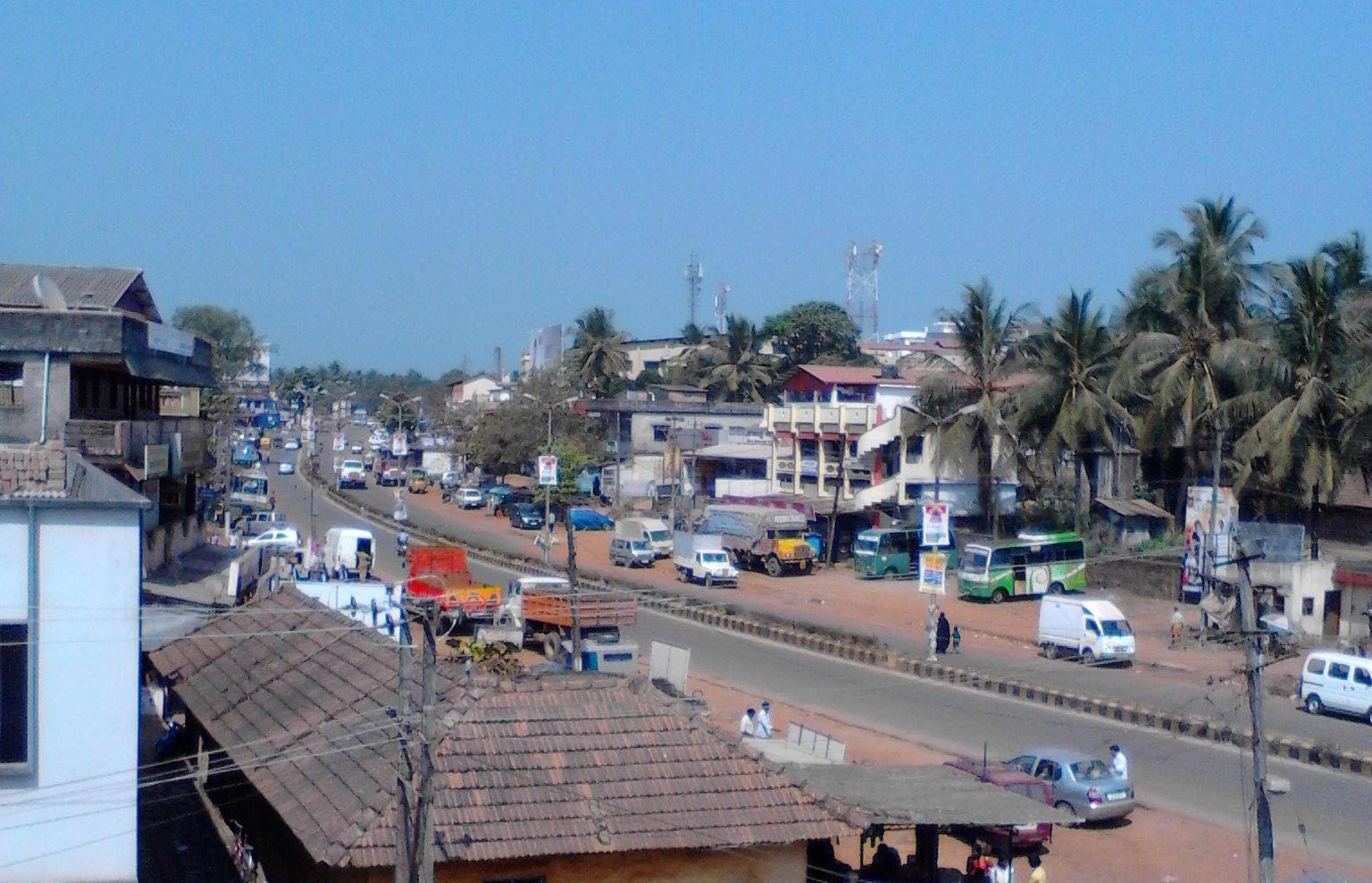
View at Kaikamba Junction

All the people are literate. A speciality of this town is that every family has at least one member abroad, the majority of them in the Middle East. In terms of religion, Hindus, Muslims and Christians are in almost equal proportion, although Hinduism is the major religion followed. Languages spoken are mainly Tulu, Konkani, Beary and Urdu, and many have knowledge of Kannada, Hindi and English.

Festivals like Diwali, Eid ul-Fitr, Vijayadashami, Eid al-Adha, Christmas and Dasara are celebrated; the festival most celebrated is Ganesh Chaturthi. People live in peace: there have been very few conflicts between these religions as compared to other suburbs in Mangalore.

== Nearby places ==
The nearby places are

Mangalore City 12 km, kinnikambla 1 km, Gurupura 3 km, Ganjimutt 3 km, Airport 7 km, Suralpady 1 km, Addur 3 km, Polali 5 km, Bajpe 5 km, Moodabidri 12 km, Moodperar Eshwarkatte 1.5 km Paduperar 3 km

== Educational institutions ==
- Al Khair Islamic English Medium School, Suralpady
- Pompei [sic] Kannada Medium School
- Govt Kannada Medium Primary School, Kinnikambla
- Bethany CBSC School Kaikamba
- Govt Urdu Medium Primary School
- Assraruddin Kambal Urdu High School
- Assraruddin Kambal (AKU) English Medium Primary School
- Balmy English Medium School
- Rosa Mystica Kannada Medium Primary & High School
- Assraruddin Arabic College
- Raj Academy CBSC school
- Ideal English Medium School
- Ideal English Medium High School
- Pana Pre-University
- Our Lady of Pompei [sic] English Medium School
- Bethany English Medium School
- St Francis Kannada medium school Moodperar
- Moodperar Mundabettu govt kannada medium school

== Temples, mosques and churches ==
- Jamia Masjid, Kaikamba City
- Shree Doomavathi Daivastana Bailu Magane
- Rajarajeshwawi Temple, Polali
- Our Lady Of Pompeii Church, Kawdoor
- St Francis Xavier Church, Mood Ferar
- Malharul Awakif Jumma Masjid (The White Masjid), Suralpady
- Shree Mahaganapathy Temple, Ganjimutt
- Brahma Balandi Temple, Mooduperar
- Jamia Masjid, Ganjimutt
- Hazrath Assraruddin Awliah Allah Dargah & Masjid, Gurukambala
- Hazrath Assraruddin Jamia Masjid, Gurukambala
- Sri Ram Bhajana Madira, Narla
- Sri Radha Krishna Bhajana Mandira, Kinnikambla
- Jamia Masjid, Kandavara Padav
- Al-Masjidul Badriya, Kandavara Padavu
- Jamaliya Jumma Masjid, Bailpete
- Noorul Islam Madrasa, Moodukare

== Social clubs ==
- ZIGMA Ganjimutta
- Challengers Friends Circle (C.F.C), Suralpady (R)
- JCI Gurupura Kaikamba (started in 2005)
- Rotary Lions Club
- K.Y.C. NARLA
- Sri Rama Sevanjali, Kandavara Padavu, Kaikamba
- Sarvajanika Ganeshothsava Seva Sammithi, Benaka Dama, Kaikamba
- Yaksha Tharangini, Kaikamba
- Knight Riders Sports and Welfare Association

== Banks and financial institutions ==
- Bank of Baroda
- Canara Bank
- Karavali Credit Co-operative Society
- Karnataka Vikas Grameena Bank
- Sri Bagavathi Sahakari Bank
- SCDCC Bank
- Kumbara Gudi Kaigarika Bank, Malali
- State Bank of India
- Axis Bank ATM

== Getting there ==
- The nearest railway station is Mangalore - 18 km
- The nearest airport is Bajpe or Mangalore International Airport which is just 8 km 15 minutes
- Mangalore city buses No. 12 and 22, 22S (Jnnurm Bus) goes via Kaikamba - 19 km, 45 minutes
- All the buses between Mangalore and Moodabidri go via Kaikamba - 19 km / 30 minutes, which includes both express and local buses, which are the most commonly used for travelling to Mangalore.

== See also ==
- Mangalore International Airport
