= Mallalli Falls =

Waterfall on the Kumaradhara River in Karnataka, India

Coordinates: 12.6°N 75.87°E

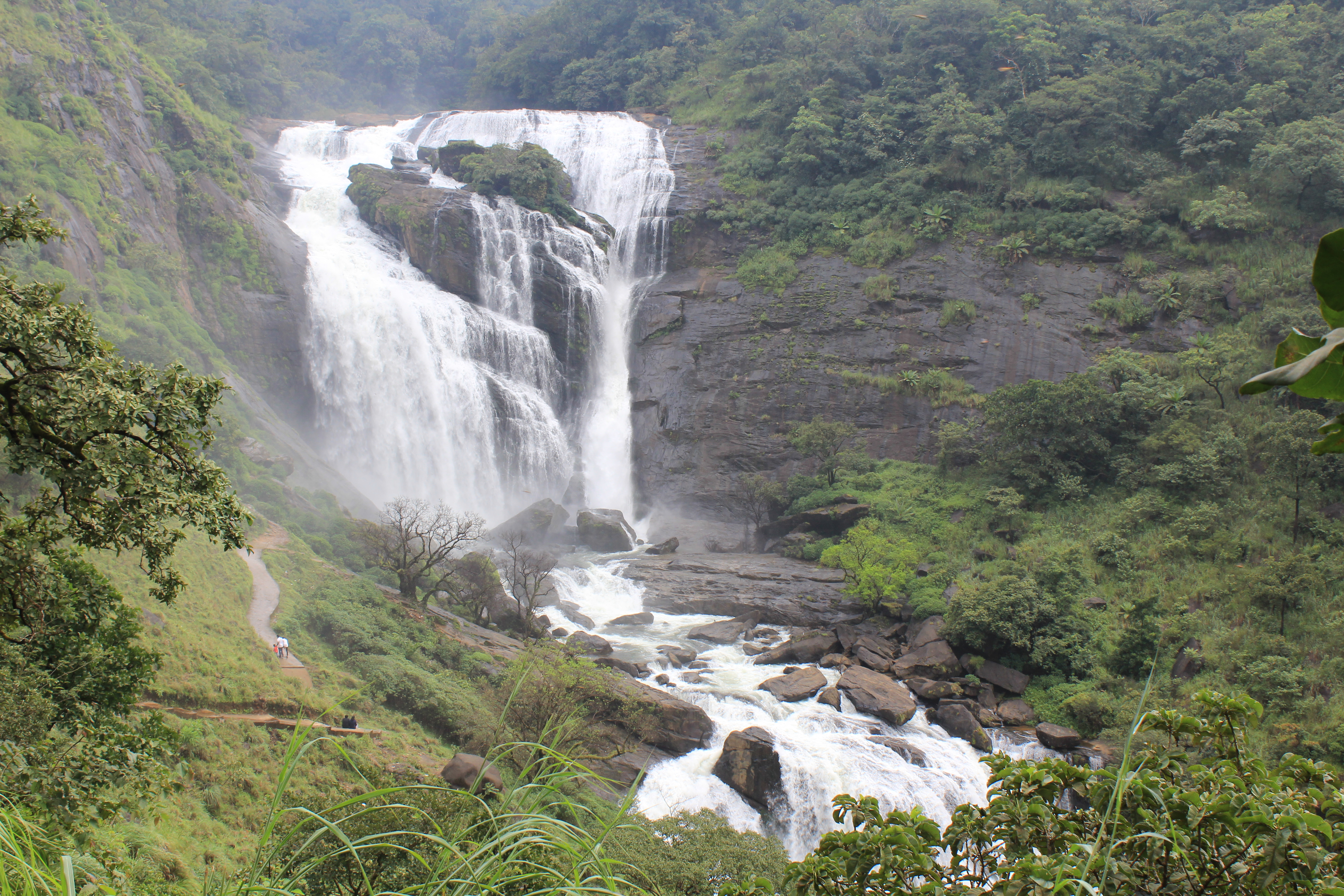
Mallalli Falls

Mallalli Falls is situated in the Somwarpet, Coorg in Karnataka state in south India. The Kumaradhara River is the main watercourse for this waterfall. The Kumaradhara later flows through Kukke Subrahmanya and merges with the Netravati River at Uppinangadi, which then empties into the Arabian Sea at Mangalore.

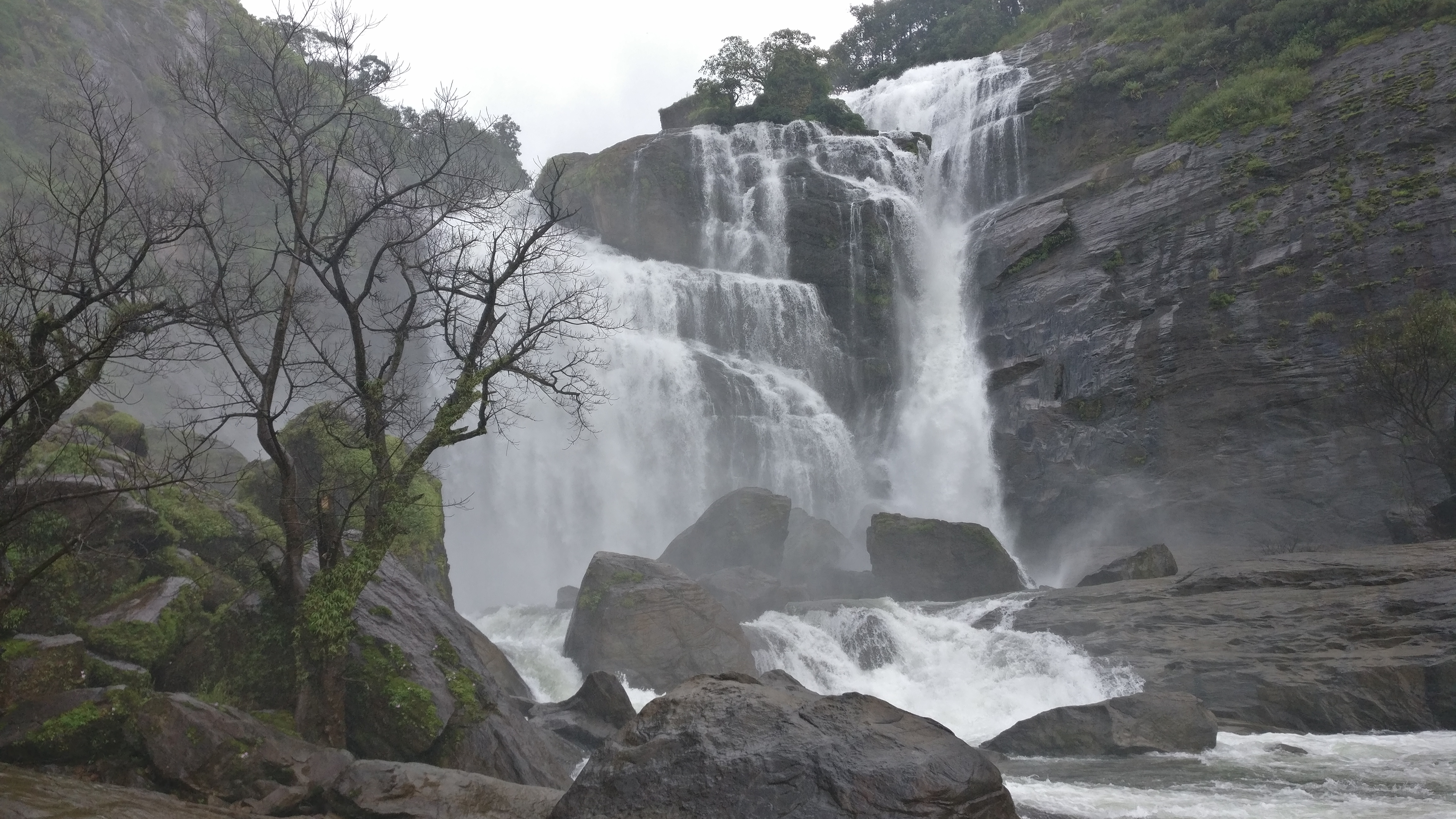
From below

== See also ==
- List of waterfalls
- List of waterfalls in India
