= Kanhangad railway station =

Railway station in Kerala, India

Kanhangad Kaanjangaad
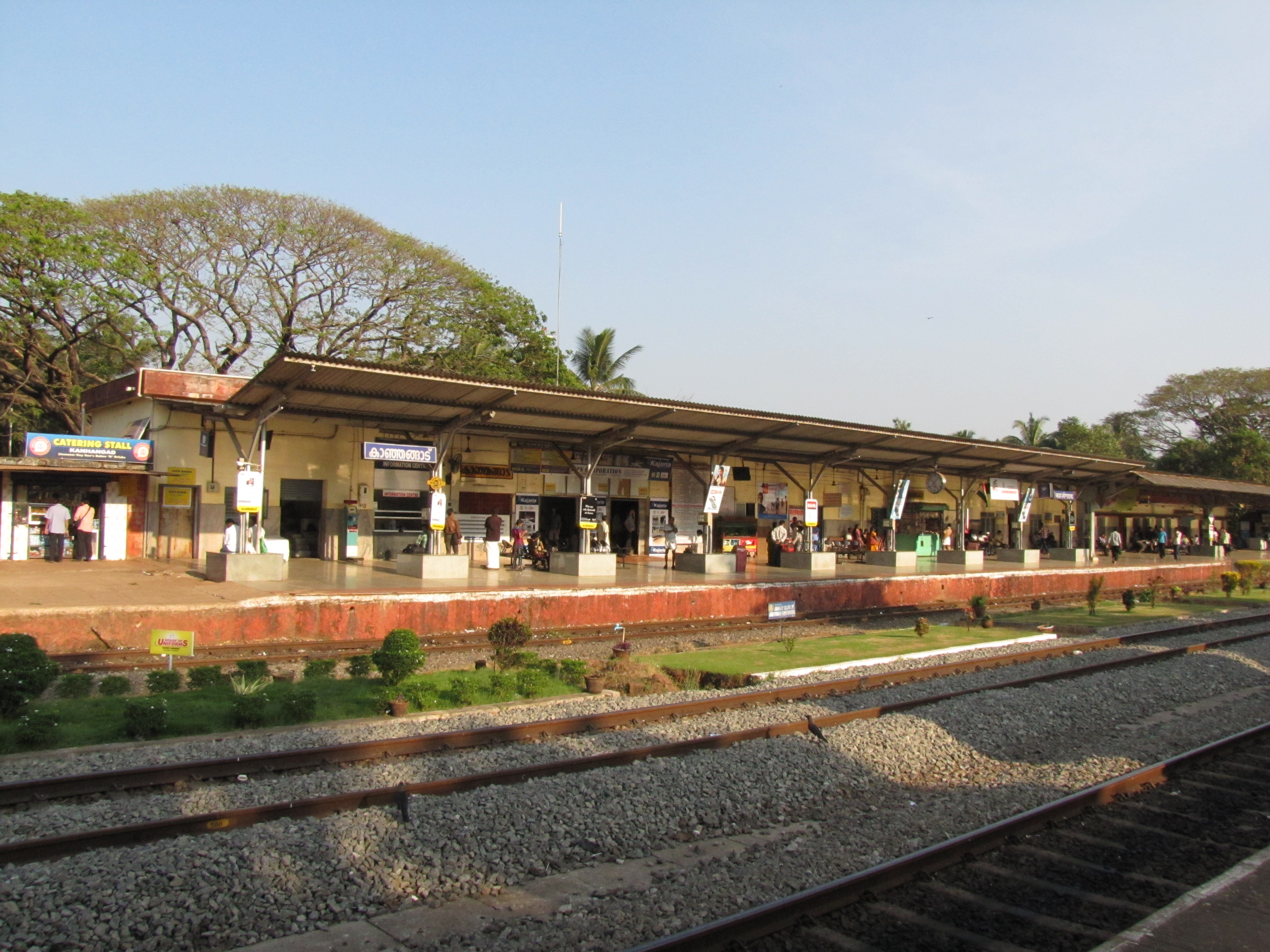
- KZE Station Flatform

General information
- Location: Railway Station Road, muriyanavi, Kasaragod, Kerala; India
- Coordinates: 12.320°N 75.085°E
- System: Indian Railways station
- Owner: Indian Railways
- Operator: Southern Railway zone
- Line: SHORANUR -MANGLORE Double line
- Platforms: 3
- Tracks: 4
- Connections: Bus stand, Taxicab stand, Auto rickshaw stand

Construction
- Structure type: Standard (on ground station)
- Parking: Yes
- Accessible: Disabled access

Other information
- Status: Functioning
- Station code: KZE
- Zone(s): Southern Railway zone
- Division(s): Palakkad

History
- Opened: 1910
- Closed: no
- Rebuilt: Processing
- Electrified: 25 kV AC 50 Hz
- Former names: Kasaragod Town

Passengers
- 3000: 500000
Route map
- Sources
Location
- Location within India Location within Kerala

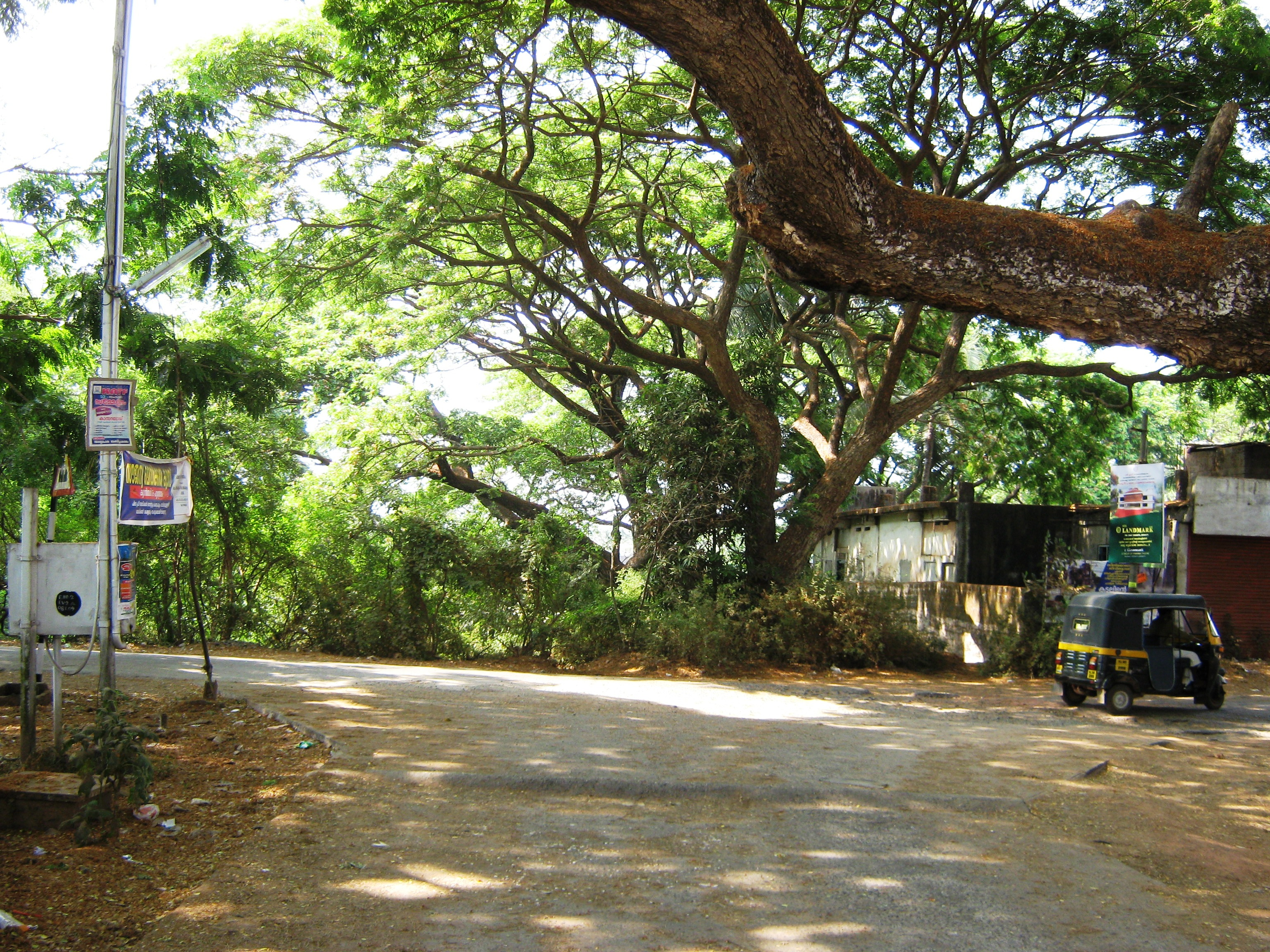
Kanhangad Railway Station Road

Kanhangad railway station (station code: KZE) is an NSG–4 category Indian railway station in Palakkad railway division of Southern Railway zone. It is serves the town of Kanhangad in the Kasaragod district of Kerala. It lies in the Shoranur–Mangalore section of the Southern Railway. The station has three platforms and four tracks.

== Services ==
Trains halting at the station connect the town to prominent cities in India such as Thiruvananthapuram, Kochi, Chennai, Kollam, Bangalore, Kozhikode, Coimbatore, Mangalore, Mysore, Mumbai, New Delhi, Kolkata, Hyderabad, and so forth.

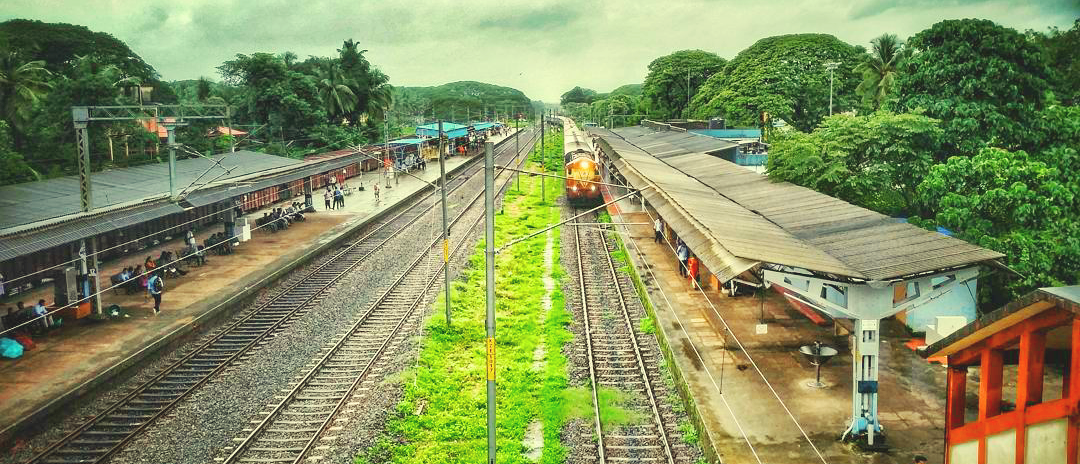
Kanhangad railway station

== Significance ==
The prominence of Kanhangad station has increased recently owing to the growth of the city as a major tourist destination with tourist spots like Bekal Fort, Ranipuram Hills and Talacauvery hill station besides leading pilgrim centres like Anandashram and Nithayanandashram and also as an upcoming educational hub. The station also assumed importance in view of its proximity with the Central University of Kerala's campus at Periya.

== Projects ==
A proposed railway line from Kanhangad railway station to Bangalore through Kaniyuru is pending since a very long time and is waiting for the final approval from the railway authorities. The survey for the full stretch has already been carried out and is found to be feasible in all aspects. The project have an estimate cost of 1200 crores for which both the states of Kerala and Karnataka has to bear half the cost and the rest by the centre.

This 91 km Kanhangad-Kaniyur line project has been conceived in two phases—Kanhangad Kaniyuru (40 km) which passes through Kerala and the rest in Karnataka. The supporters of the line claim that if it materializes, then Bangalore will be only 348 km away from Kanhangad or in other words, the duration to reach Bangalore will be six hours only. Currently, the Kanhangad-Bangalore route either via Mangalore or Palakkad is more than 650 km taking an exhausting 12 hours to reach.

The distance and time required to connect Mysore, Subramanya and Hassan to North Kerala will also be reduced. It will also give fillip to the tourism sector connecting Talacauvery, Subramanya, Bekal and Ranipuram and will also be a boon to education and business sector where a number of students and professionals hailing from Kerala will have an easy access to the IT city, Bangalore. It will also help the merchants in easing their trade and can have a good revenue as it helps in easy access and exchange of goods between the two states.

If implemented, Kanhangad station will be upgraded as a railway junction and a special train service from Kanhangad to Bangalore will be a major push for the station and this will also accelerate the development of the city and entire North Malabar region.
