= Gurupura River =

Coordinates: 12°50′57″N 74°49′52″E

Gurupura River Phalguni River, Kulur River
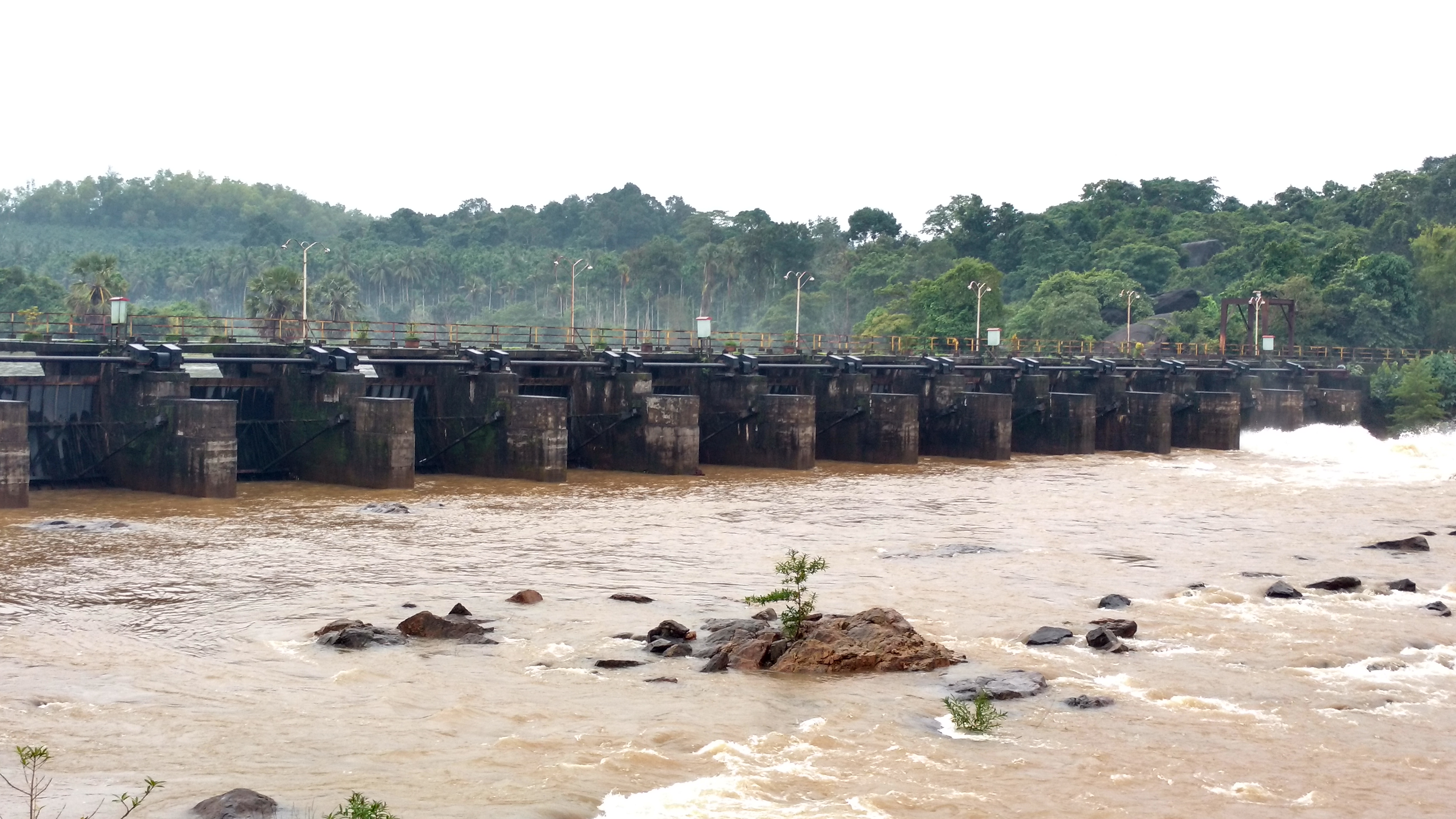
- Gurupura river in Mangalore city

Location
- Country: India
- State: Karnataka
- Cities: Mangalore, Gurupura

The Gurupura River (also known as Pachamagaru River, Phalguni River or Kulur River) is a river in the Karnataka state of India. It originates in the Western Ghats and is a distributary of the Netravati River, which empties into the Arabian Sea, south of Mangalore. It gets its name from the town Gurupura, situated near Mangalore. The New Mangalore Port and Mangalore Chemicals and Fertilizers are situated on its northern banks.

== See also ==
- List of rivers of Dakshina Kannada and Udupi districts
- Netravati River
