= Badagabettu =

Badagabettu (No.80)
- village
- Interactive map of Badagabettu (No.80)
- Coordinates: 13.3238°N 74.7884°E
- Country: India
- State: Karnataka
- District: Udupi
- Talukas: Udupi

Government
  - Body: Gram panchayat
- Elevation: 34.4424 m (113.000 ft)

Population (2001)
  - Total: 6,985

Languages
  - Official: Kannada
- Time zone: UTC+5:30 (IST)
- ISO 3166 code: IN-KA
- Vehicle registration: KA
- Website: karnataka.gov.in

Badagabettu (No.80) is a village in the southern state of Karnataka, India. It is located in the Udupi taluk of Udupi district in Karnataka.

== Demographics ==
As of 2001 India census, Badagabettu (No.80) had a population of 6985 with 3464 males and 3521 females.

== See also ==
- Udupi
- Parkala
