= Swarna River =

River in India

Coordinates: 13°27′04″N 74°41′44″E

Swarna River (also spelled Suvarna River) is a river located in the Udupi district of Karnataka, India. It is a west-flowing river that originates in the Western Ghats and empties into the Arabian Sea. There is one CWC Hydrological Observation Station at Yennehole on this river.

== Course ==
The Swarna River originates in the foothills of the Western Ghats and flows westward through several villages, including Yennehole Perdoor, Hiriadka, Parkala, Manipal, Perampalli, and Uppoor, before reaching its confluence with the Arabian Sea near Kodi Bengre. It covers a distance of approximately 55 kilometers.

== Hydrology ==
The Swarna River is primarily rain-fed and experiences peak flow during the monsoon season, typically from June to September. The river has tributaries, including the Yennehole and Kaud Hole, which merge to form the main river.

== Dams and water supply ==
Three dams have been constructed along the Swarna River, one at Yennehole village, the second at Hiriyadka and the third at Shiroor. The first dam- constructed in Yennehole- is providing water supply for agriculture and drinking to nearby villages like Hermunde, Ajekar and Yennehole. Another two dams are crucial for supplying drinking water to Udupi City and the surrounding areas. The river also supports agriculture, particularly rice and coconut farming, in the region.

== See also ==
- Udupi district
- Western Ghats
- Arabian Sea
- List of rivers of Dakshina Kannada and Udupi districts
