= G. K. Govinda Rao =

Indian actor (1937–2021)

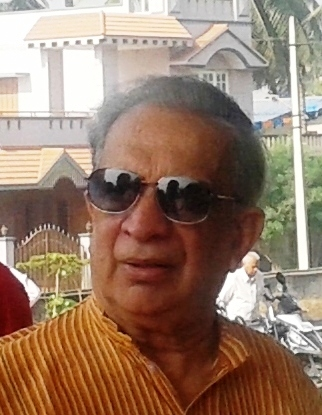
- G.K.Govinda Rao, 2014
- Born: 27 April 1937; Bangalore, Karnataka
- Died: 15 October 2021 (aged 84); Hubballi, Karnataka
- Occupations: actor, theatre, poet, resource person

G. K. Govinda Rao (27 April 1937 – 15 October 2021) was a writer, intellectual, professor of English and Kannada film actor from Karnataka, India.

== Career ==
G.K.Govinda Rao has acted in several Kannada films including Grahana and has appeared in lead roles in the Kannada T.V. serials Maha Parva and. Malgudi Days. He is considered an authoritative resource person in the fields of theater and cinema. He has been invited to give lectures to university students on theatre topics.

== Filmography ==
- Katha Sangama (1976)
- Grahana (1978)
- Mithileya Seetheyaru (1988)
- Doctor Krishna (1989)
- Curfew (1994)
- Nishyabda (1998)
- Bhoomi Thayiya Chochchala Maga (1998)
- Ajju (2004)
- Shastri (2005)
- Savira Mettilu (2006)
- ...Re (2016)

== Television ==
- Maha Parva
- Malgudi Days
- Mukta (TV series)

== Social movement ==
G.K.Govinda Rao has participated in several social movements and has openly criticized certain "divisive" political parties and supported Congress party during the 2014 General elections. He opposed superstitions practiced in society like Made Made Snana and gave lectures to create awareness against prevailing superstitions.

=== Criticism and controversies ===
G.K.Govinda Rao is known for having a sharp tongue and once termed the quality of Kannada motion pictures produced at Gandhinagar, Bangalore as daridra (wretched) which created controversy and certain film producers protested his statement and demanded an apology from Mr. Rao. He also criticized noted writers S. L. Bhyrappa, Pejavar Seer and Narendra Modi for their stands on urulu seve, treatment of minorities, etc. G.K.Govinda Rao has stated that he was not a supporter of the Naxal Movement of Karnataka although he expressed displeasure on the arrest of Vittala Malekudiya for his alleged link with Naxals.
