= Pajiradka =

Village in India

Pajiradka is a place in Kalmanja Village Belthangandi Taluk which is part of Dakshina Kannada district in India. It is basically a pilgrimage place where the famous Shri Sadashiveshwara Temple is located. This temple is very famous as it is in the bank of Netravati River. This is also called as 'Sangama Kshetra' as two rivers Mrutunjaya and Netravati merge and flow down as 'Netravati.

Pajiradka is about 9 km from the Dharmasthala and around 6 km from the nearest town Ujire. you can reach Pajiradka By road via Nidigal or 'Neera Chilume'.
