= List of rivers of Dakshina Kannada and Udupi districts =

This is a list of some of the notable rivers which flow through the two districts of Dakshina Kannada and Udupi. Almost all rivers of these districts flow westward and join Arabian Sea.

- Netravati River, whose tributaries include the Kumaradhara and Gurupura
- Nandini
- Shambhavi River
- Swarna River
- Panchagangavalli River
- Souparnika River
- Varahi River
