= Made Made Snana =

Hindu practice

Made Made Snana (ಮಡೆ ಮಡೆ ಸ್ನಾನ), also Made Snana, is a Hindu practice observed in some Hindu temples of Karnataka.

The ritual involves devotees rolling over the plantain leaves used for serving food during communal meals, after food has been partaken by Brahmins.

== Practice ==
Temples in South India, hold communal meals for people of all sects, during special religious occasions. These meals, are typically of the traditional South Indian variety, where Hindu people are served food over plantain leaves on the temple floor. The ritual of Made Made Snana involves devotees rolling over the plantain leaves, once food has been partaken by Brahmins. The devotees then take a holy dip in the nearby Kumaradhara River, after which the ritual is said to be complete. The practice is said to be more than 500 years old.

It is believed that the ritual rids one of bad Karma, skin diseases and other ailments. Devotees say it is good stress relief.

Made Made Snana was predominantly practiced on certain festive days in Subramanya temples of Karnataka, but has also been performed at vaishnavite places such as the Krishna Math, Udupi. The practice is actively practiced in the Kukke Subramanya Temple, and in the Subramanya temples of Kalavara, Kundapura Taluk and Ramanathapura, Hassan District.

The Supreme Court of India has stated the Karnataka High Court order allowing such rituals to continue. Since the conventional Made Made Snana is now illegal, a modified version known as "Ede Snana", in which devotees roll over "prasada" (food offered to the deity) or consumed by cows is still practised.

== Controversy ==
The practice in the prominent Kukke Subramanya Temple has generated controversy in the State of Karnataka, where certain groups and individuals, including the State president of the Backward Classes Awareness Forum, K S Shivaram, who suggested that the practice symbolizes slavery, are demanding a ban, calling it a campaign against “blind beliefs”. The practice is generally performed by Hindus of all varna, including the Brahmins. The protestors however claim to be campaigning against Dalit oppression at the hand of Upper-caste Hindus, especially the Brahmins. The groups claim to be protesting the casteism, superstition of the practice, and against the caste-based segregation followed during the communal meals. Udupi Matt's Pejawar Swami does support this superstitious act. It has also been reported that neither the Government of Karnataka, nor the Kukke Subramanya Temple administration endorses the continued practice of the ritual.

The imposition of a ban, however, has been challenged in the courts by the very community the protestors claim to be defending. It has been continually challenged in court by the Rajya Adivasi Budakattu Hitharakshana Vedike (ರಾಜ್ಯ ಆದಿವಾಸಿ ಬುಡಕಟ್ಟು ಹಿತರಕ್ಷಣ ವೇದಿಕೆ), an Adivasi (classified as Dalit) rights group, who have questioned the motives in banning a practice voluntarily undertaken by people from all walks of life:

"“People from Brahmin communities and people hailing from all other communities perform this ritual out of
  their own wish. It is a sort of cathartic communication with the supreme divine for many. The ritual should 
  never be gauged in terms of logic because it is a subjective matter governed by sentiments and belief system
  of the people performing it,” says Rajya Adivasi Budakattu Hitharakshana Vedike president Bhaskar Bendodi who
  has been fighting a legal battle to protect the ritual.
  
  He questions the intention of the intellectuals who remain silent throughout the year and plunge into action 
  against the ritual only when the temple is all set to organise it during three days of ‘Shashti’ festival."

It has also been reported that members from the forest tribe, Malekudiyas, who traditionally decorate the Temple Ratha for the procession, refused to do so, were the stay on the practice not lifted. Udayavani reports a member of the community as saying,

"The Malekudiyas of the region refuting the charges of the intellectuals that atrocities are inflicted 
 on the Dalits in the name of the ritual, say that no dalit is put on a gun point by anybody to perform
 the ritual."

Not surprisingly, the practice continues to draw devotees from all over the state, while simultaneously drawing harsh condemnation on the Internet.

== Government action ==
The Government of Karnataka sought to bypass the courts by including a provision banning the practice, in the Anti-Superstition bill tabled -and subsequently dropped- in the Winter assembly of 2014. The legislation also included laws, which allowed the state to gain administrative control of Hindu Temples & Mutts over arbitrary transgressions.
