= Herga =

Villiage in Karnataka, India

- village
- Location in Karnataka, India Herga (India)
- Coordinates: 13.360°N 74.804°E
- Country: India
- State: Karnataka
- District: Udupi

Government
  - Type: Panchayati raj (India)
  - Body: Gram panchayat

Languages
  - Official: Kannada
- Time zone: UTC+5:30 (IST)
- PIN: 576 134
- Telephone code: 0820
- ISO 3166 code: IN-KA
- Vehicle registration: KA-20

Herga is a small village in the Udupi district of Karnataka, India.

== Geography ==
The village has mainly paddy fields. It is approximately 3 kilometres from Parkala and 8 kilometers from Manipal.

== Herga Temple ==
Herga has a Durgaparameshwari Temple on a small hilltop. During February of each year, procession (jaatre or uthsava) of the deity is carried out and is celebrated as a grand event. The temple was renovated in 1983. A Dhwajasthamba (flag-post) made of stone was constructed in 1993. The presiding Goddess of the temple is also known as Hergamma (protector of Herga) or Gramadevate (Grama - village, Devate - Goddess).

== Climate ==
The climate is humid and warm between November and May and wet and cool during the monsoon months from June to October. It has a tropical climate characteristic of coastal plains in the West of India.
