= Yedamangala railway station =

Railway station in Karnataka, India

Coordinates: 12.7150°N 75.4433°E

Yedamangala railway station (Station code:YDM) is located in Dakshina Kannada district , Karnataka state, India. It is on Mangalore-Hassan-Mysore line. Yedamangala railway station comes under jurisdiction of South Western Railway zone (SWR) of Indian Railways. At present it is a crossing train station used to facilitate smooth crossing of two trains running in opposite directions in a single railway track line.The preceding rail station from Mangaluru Junction is Kaniyuru.Yedamangala railway station is at a altitude of 122 metres above mean sea level (msl).
