= Suralpady =

Suralpady Badagaulipady
- village
- Location in Karnataka, India Suralpady (India)
- Coordinates: 12.87°N 74.84°E
- Country: India
- State: Karnataka
- District: Dakshina Kannada
- Talukas: Mangalore

Government
  - Body: Gram panchayat

Population (2011)
  - Total: 7,062

Languages
  - Official: Kannada
- Time zone: UTC+5:30 (IST)
- ISO 3166 code: IN-KA
- Vehicle registration: KA
- Website: Official website

Suralpady also known as Badagulipady is a suburban town located in Mangalore City of Dakshina Kannada district in the state of Karnataka, India. Suralpady lies between Moodbidri & Mangalore city in National highway 169 (Old no NH-13). The town is 13.6 km away from Mangalore International Airport, 19.9 km from Mangalore Central Railway Station, 21.8 km from Mangalore old Port and 25.9 km from New Mangalore port.

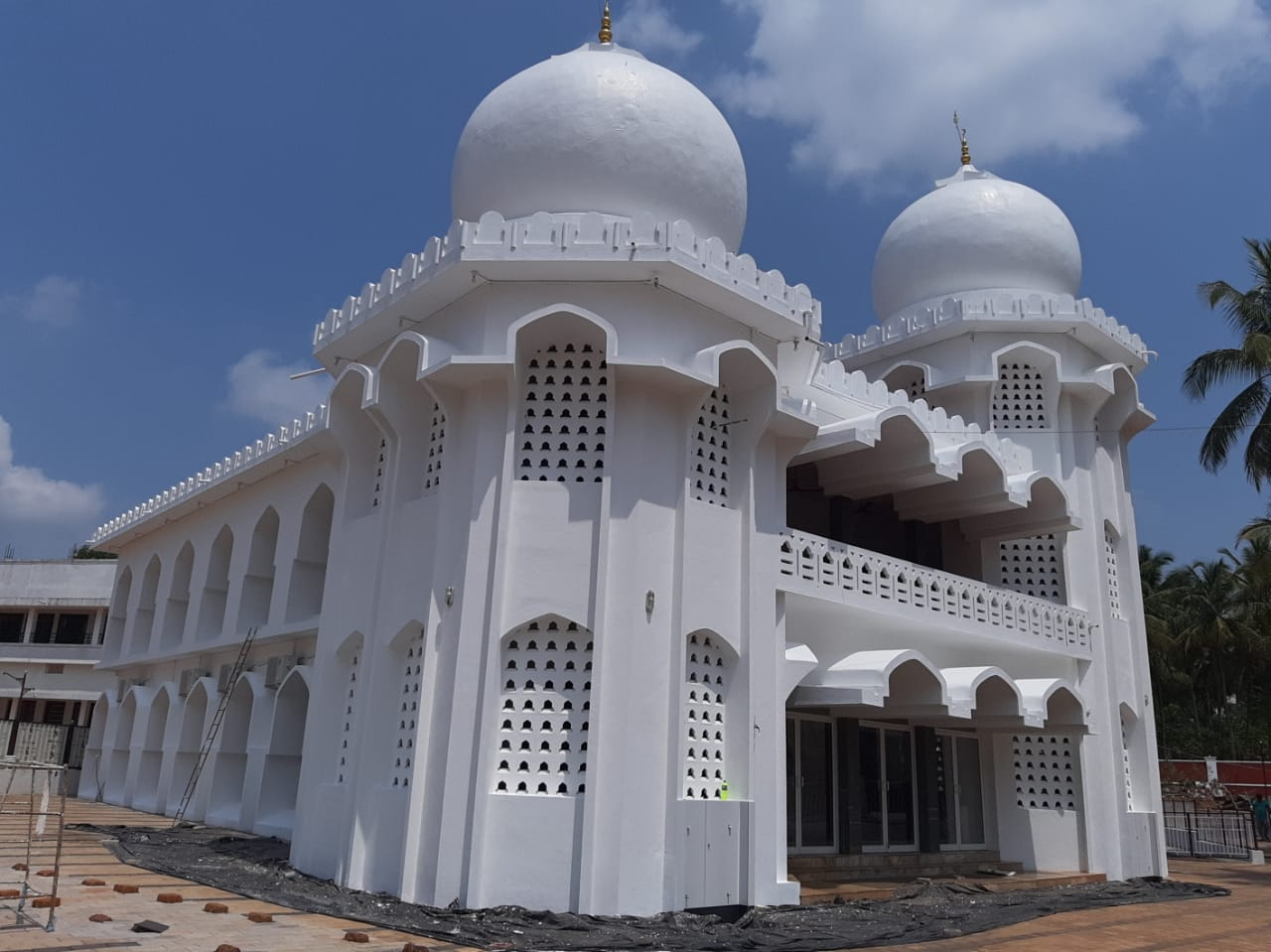
Malharul Awakif Jumma Masjid, Suralpady

Suralpady Comes under Ganjimutt Grama Panchayat. Efforts are being made to include this town into Mangalore City Corporation. The State department of Industries & Commerce has approved setting up of Plastic Park in Ganjimutt which is 2.4 km away from Suralpady with estimated cost of INR 152 Crore in a 104acres of land against 61 acres available now. 32 companies have registered to set up their units there.

Due to the geographic location close to airport Mangalore International Airport, city and industrial area the land prices are soaring high, as much as Rs.5 Lakhs per cent.

The geographical location of Suralpady is 12°58’09.5" N 74°56’28.6" E and it is situated approximately 100 meters above sea level.

== Demographics ==
As of 2011 Census, Suralpady has total population of 7062 with almost equal sex ratio of male & female. Male population was 3355 and female population was 3707. The male & female literacy rate are equal as well.

== Constituency ==
Suralpady comes under Mangalore City – North constituency of Legislative Assembly. Bharath Shetty Y (BJP) is elected as MLA from this Constituency from 2018 till 2023.

Suralpady comes under Dakshina Kannada (Lok Sabha Constituency) with Captain Brijesh Chowta as elected Member of Parliament (MP) from 2019 to 2024.

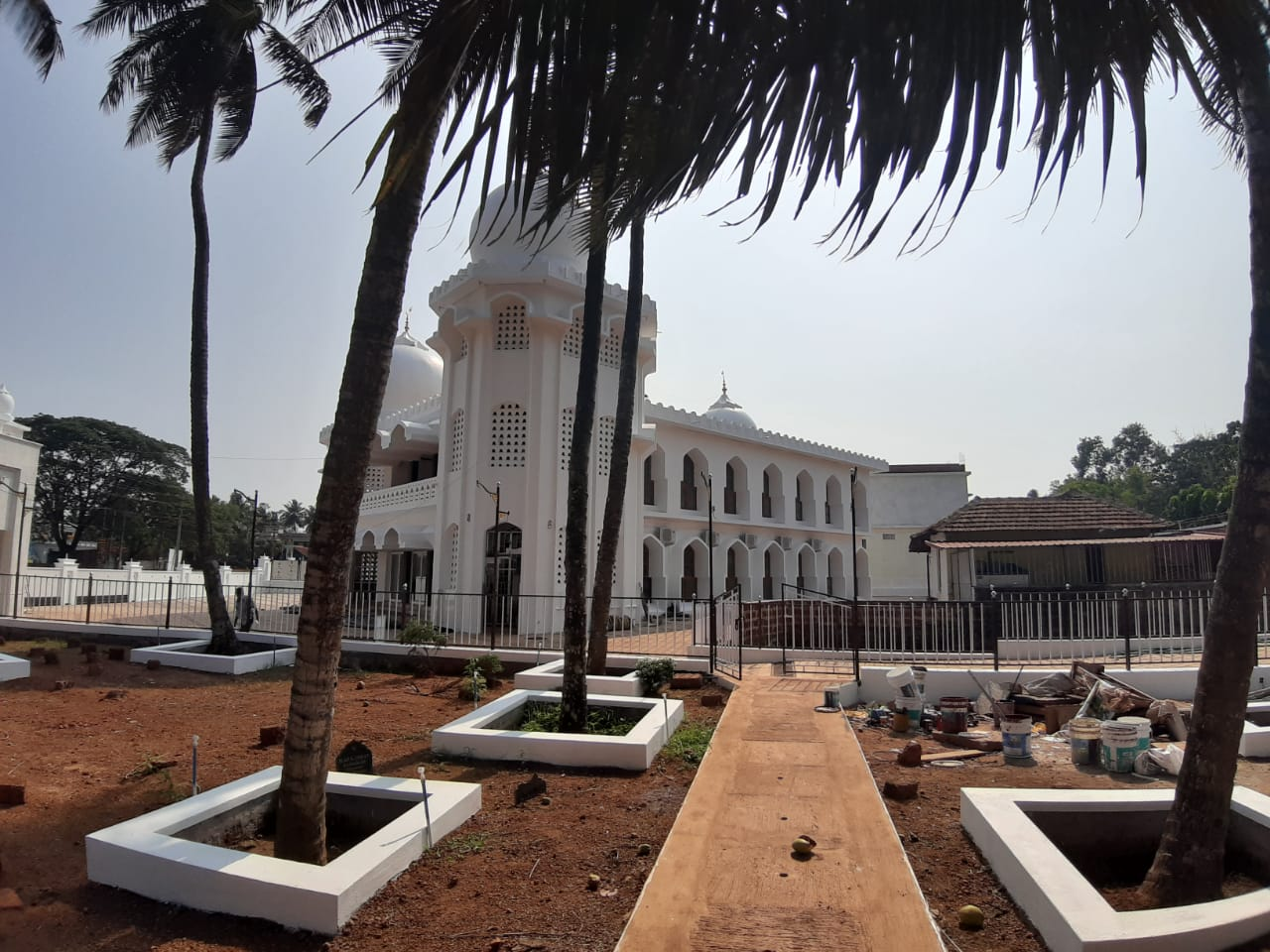
Malharul Awakif Jumma Masjid in 2020

== Religious place ==
- Malharul Awakif Jumma Masjid, Suralpady
- Masjid Thouheed, Suralpady
- Masjid Ayesha, Suralpady
- Masjid Abubakker, Suralpady
- Rahmaniya Jumma Masjid, Suralpady

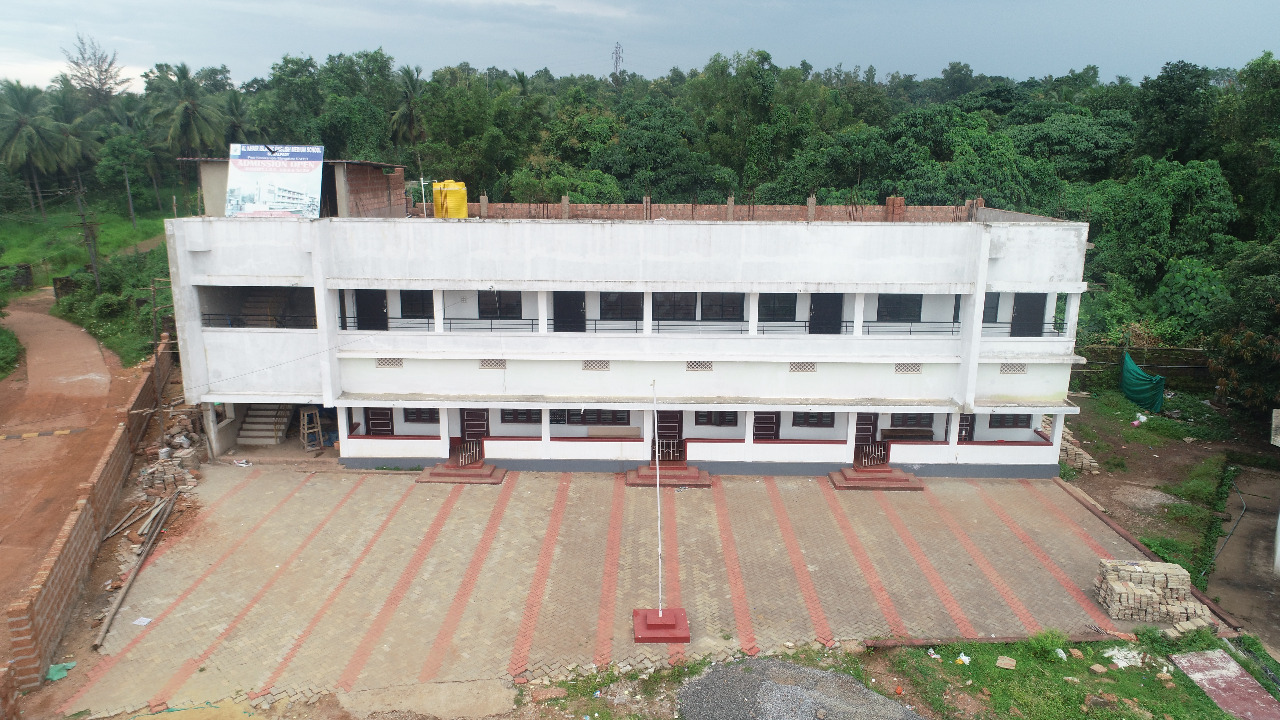
Al-Khair Islamic English Medium School, Suralpady

== Educational institutions ==
- Noorul Uloom Madrasa
- Al-Khair Islamic English Medium School
- Government Higher Primary School
- AKU English Medium Public School
- AKU Urdu High School
- AKU Pre-University Women's College

== Social organizations ==
- Challenger Friends Circle (CFC)
- Suralpady Friends Associated Trust (SFA)
- Irshadul Muslimeen Youth Association (IMYA)
- Helping Hands Suralpady
- Shubada
