= Kalmanja village =

Coordinates: 12°59′30″N 75°21′56″E

Kalmanja is a village in the Belthangady taluk in Dakshina Kannada district in Karnataka, India. Kalmanja has around 2000 people, most of whom are farmers and agriculturists. The main language is Tulu. This village belongs to Belthangadi Taluk and is managed by Belthangadi Taluk Panchayat (a government body).

== See also ==
Pajiradka
