= Kadaba =

- Town
- Country: India
- State: Karnataka
- District: Dakshina Kannada

Government
  - Body: Town Panchayath
  - Administrative Officer: Ramesh Babu T

Area
  - Total: 18.67 km^{2} (7.21 sq mi)
- Elevation: 118 m (387 ft)

Population (2011)
  - Total: 9,546
  - Density: 511.3/km^{2} (1,324/sq mi)

Languages
  - Official: Kannada,Tulu
- Time zone: UTC+5:30 (IST)
- PIN: 574221
- Telephone code: 91-08257, 91-08251
- Vehicle registration: KA-21, KA-70 & KA-19
- Lok Sabha constituency: Dakshina Kannada
- Website: http://www.kadabatown.mrc.gov.in

Kadaba is a taluk in Dakshina Kannada district of Karnataka, India. It is located 82 km towards East from District headquarters Mangalore, 31 km from Puttur, 38 km from Sullia and 272 km from State capital Bangalore.

== Etymology ==
As per the locals, Kadaba was ruled by 'Kadamba' dynasty hence the name 'Kadaba'. However, there are no valid evidence proving the same. As per the Historians Kadaba had been called Kadamma (Kadave, a male deer) since the animals were found in large number here in the past. The main languages are Tulu, Kannada and Malayalam. Kadaba taluk is the place where all religions are free to practice their rituals. During the festivals all religion people gather in the temples, churches and mosques and worship and show harmony.

== History ==
The demand for Taluk status for Kadaba was first raised by President C PHILIP and Vice President Naryana Gowda Kaikure

formed 'Kadaba Taluk Rachana Horata Samiti' along with Mira Shaib, CC Chacko, Niranjan Ariga, Naryan Bhat Kalpure, Thomson KT, Abdual Kadhar, Janardhan Gowda Puthilla, Vijaya Kumar Rai, Roy Abrham, James Cormadam, NK Naryan Rai, PP Varughese, Krisha Shetty, Pulasiya Rai, C P Simon, Micheal OJ, Elyaz HK, Harish pai, Harish Rai, pilya Puthu, Gopal Nayakand many people of Kadaba in 1961. B.M Hundekar taluk re-organisation committee, in its recommendations in 1985, had suggested the formation of Kadaba taluk. Later, the Gaddigowdar Committee had also recommended the same. The government had appointed a special Tahsildar for Kadaba in 2001. However, in 2009, the Taluk reconstitution committee under the chairmanship of M.B Prakash had excluded Kadaba in its recommendations.

In 2013, government declared Kadaba as Taluk along with Moodbidri of Dakshin Kannada District and Byndoor and Brahmavar of Udupi district. On 15 March 2017, Karnataka government under Chief Minister Siddaramaiah has re-declared Kadaba as Taluk again and from 1 January 2018 it is officially functioning as Taluk headquarters. Kadaba taluk is carved out of Puttur and Sullia taluks and the new taluk comprises nine villages from Puttur taluk and seven villages of Sullia. The creation of Kadaba taluk will benefit the people who have been travelling 65 km to the Puttur taluk office to get any work done. Now, the people of Subramnya, Nelyadi, Shiradi can reach the taluk head office by travelling a distance of only 10 to 20 km.

== Education ==
Kadaba has Schools and Colleges in and around though Professional colleges are yet to start in Kadaba. Govt. Primary, High Schools and PU College and St. Joachims Institutions (founded in 1926) are the oldest schools of Kadaba.

In 2017, then Chief Minister Siddaramaih laid the foundation stone for the veterinary college at Koila to be built under the management of Karnataka Veterinary, Animal and Fisheries Sciences University.

== Pilgrimage and Tourism ==
Famous Pilgrimage places like Kukke Subramanya and Dharmasthala are easily accessible from Kadaba.

=== Pilgrim Centers ===
There are few pilgrim centers around Kadaba, which made its existence through regular visits by tourists every year. Kukke Subrahmanya temple Kukke Subramanya Temple is a famous pilgrim center which is at a distance of 20 km (12 mi) from Kadaba. Sri. Dharmasthala Manjunatheshwara temple Dharmasthala is also nearby, at a distance of 37 km (23 mi). St. George Church at Ichilampady is a Christian (Indian Orthodox) pilgrim center, which is at a distance of 10 km (6.2 mi) from Kadaba.

Kaniyooru or Kaniyuru Matha one of the Ashta Matha founded by Dwaita philoshpher Shri Madhvacharya is at Kaniyuru village in Kadaba taluq.The Kaniyur village is connected by Karnataka state highway 100 (SH-100) and also by Kaniyooru railway station (KYNR) on Bengaluru to Mangaluru railway track via Sakleshpura.

=== Tourist Attractions ===
1. Kumara Parvatha: This place is famous for trekking, where number of trekkers visits every year. The panoramic view of Western Ghat seals the heart of people who make an attempt to clinch the top of mountain. This hill is at a distance of 23 km (14 mi) from Kadaba.
2. Yenmmoor, a historical martial arts center, Garodi in tulu language.
3. Western ghats (Shiraadi) : This place is famous for thrilling cave drive. The enchanting view of western ghats, gushing sound of river, chirping of birds and roaring of animals enthrals visitors.

== Agriculture and Economy ==
Commercial Crops: Arecanut, Rubber, Pepper, Cocoa, Coconut and Cashew plantations are the source of income for this region. Acres of Arecanut and Rubber plantations are the common view, which has boosted the economy and lifestyle of people. The Kumaradhara River is the main source of water for growing crops. The CPCRI Kidu farm one of Asia's biggest Coconut farm is located at Nettana, Kadaba taluk.

=== Research institutes ===
1. Central Plantation Crops Research Institute (CPCRI) Kidu, Nettana.
2. Rubber Research Center, Kombar, Nettana.
3. Karnataka Forest Development Corporation (KFDC), Nettana.
4. Central Forest Depot, Nettana.
5. Government Veterinary Institute, Koila.

== Transportation ==
Kadaba can be reached either through Road or Rail. It lies on State Highway 113, also known as Uppinangady-Bisle Ghat Road. Karnataka state highway 100 (SH-100) connects Puttur town to Kukke Subramanya via Kaniyuru. National Highway 75 (India) passes through Kadaba taluk villages of Nelyadi (Nelyady)and Shiradi (Shirady). The nearest major railway station is Subrahmanya Road railway station at Nettana.The trains carrying passengers going to Mangaluru, Bengaluru, Mysuru, Hubballi, Karwar and Kasargod and Kannur have stop at Subramanya train station. Other railway stations of Kadaba taluku are Kaniyuru ,Yedamangala (Edamangala),Kodimbala,Bajekere and Shrivagilu (Shribagilu).

Mangalore International Airport at Bajpe is the nearest Airport to Kadaba taluk. New Mangalore Port (NMPT) at Panambur is nearest sea port.

== See also ==
- Puttur, Karnataka
- Belthangady
- Nelliyadi
- Sullia
- Sakleshpur
- Somvarpet
