= Uppinangady =

Uppinangady Ubar
- Town
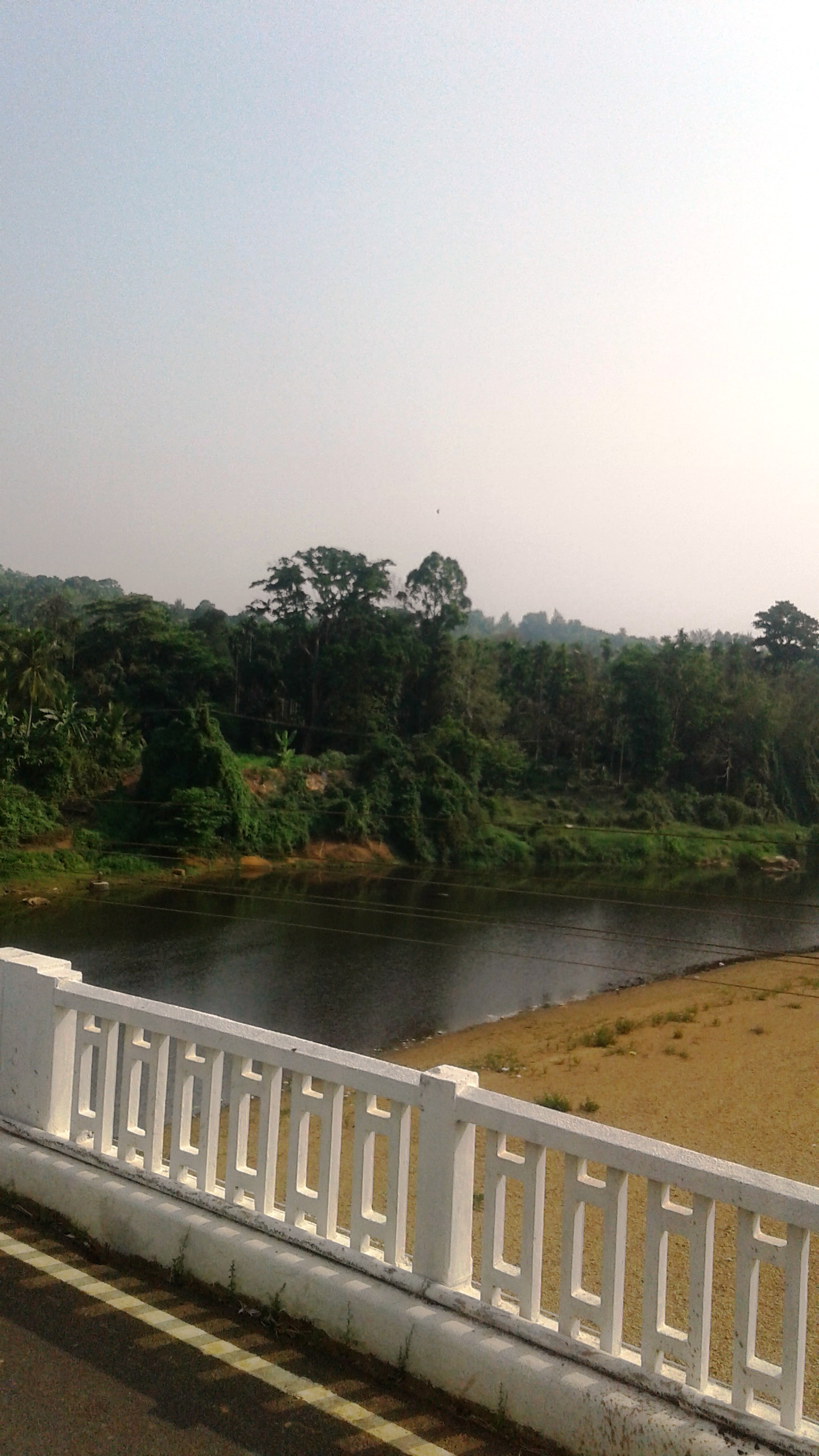
- Uppinangady Bridge

- Location in Karnataka, India
- Coordinates: 12.839972°N 75.248982°E
- Country: India
- State: Karnataka
- District: Dakshina Kannada

Government
  - Body: Grama Panchayath, Nadakacheri

Population (2011)
  - Total: 7,813

Languages
  - Official: Tulu, Kannada
- Time zone: UTC+5:30 (IST)
- PIN: 574 241
- Telephone code: 08251

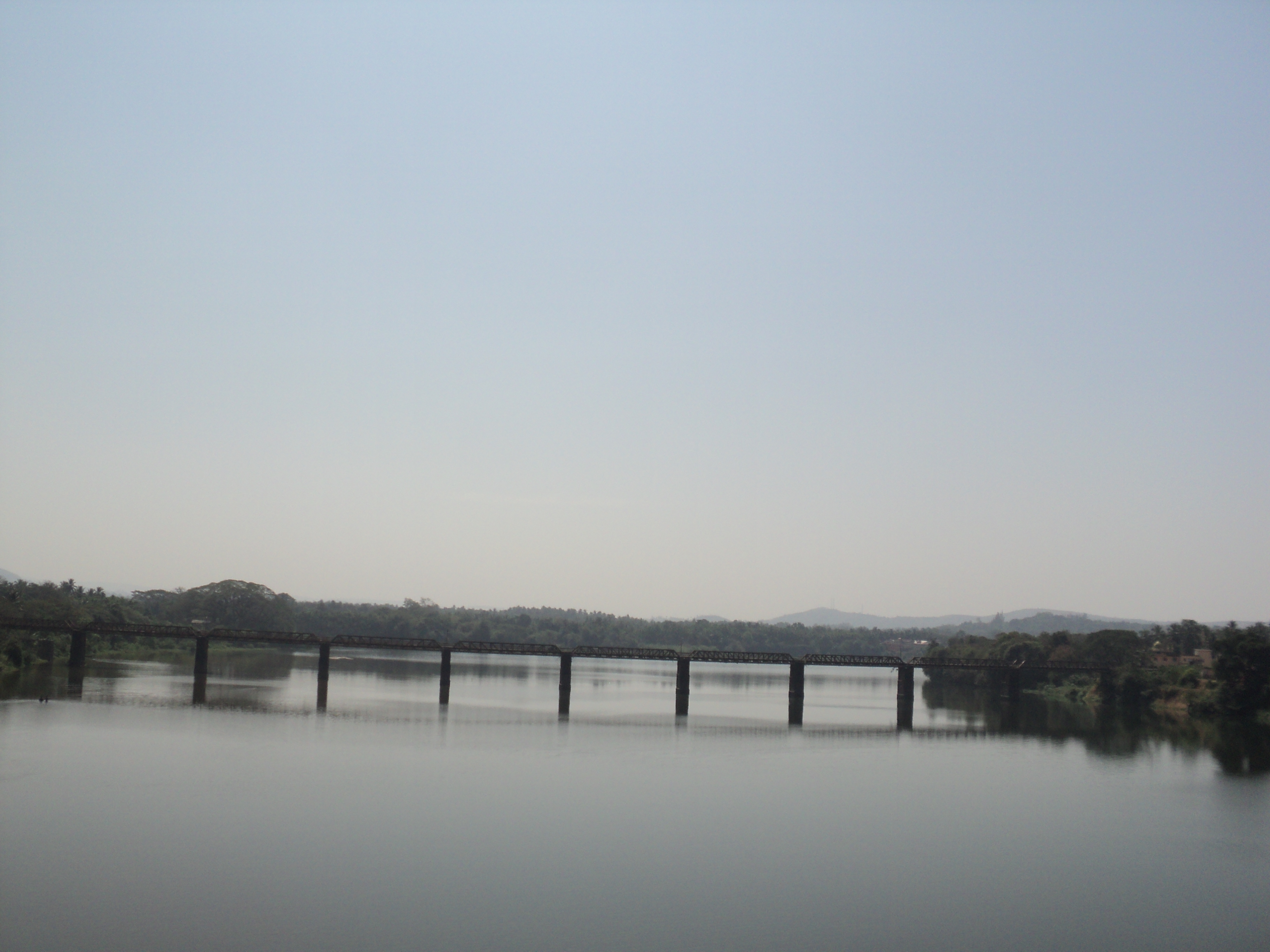
Nethravathi River in Uppina Angadi

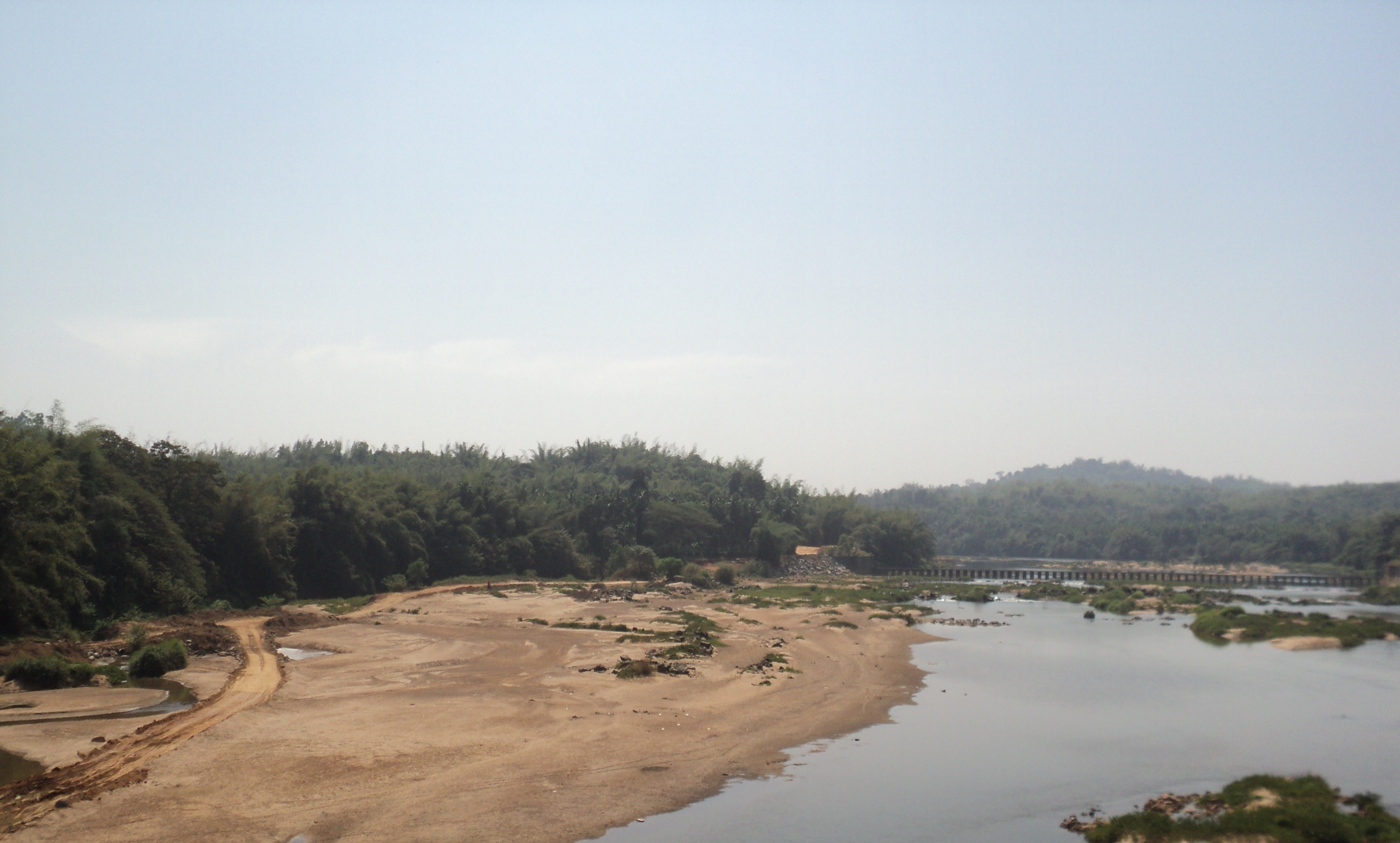
Kumaradhara River in Uppinangady

Uppinangady or Ubar is a town in the Puttur talk of Dakshina Kannada district in the state of Karnataka, India. It is surrounded by the Kumaradhara River on one side and Nethravathi River on the other. When the town's two surrounding rivers rise during the rainy season and meet, this is called the "Sangam" which is a Sanskrit word for confluence. The Sangam is a major event as people from the surrounding villages crowd the river banks to witness the merge. The population of Uppinangady is 7,172.

In 1923 the town of Uppinangady was washed out due to excessive flooding, and its courts were moved to Puttur. Severe flooding also occurred in 1974. Uppinangady was previously the Taluk Headquarters, but due to the issue of heavy flooding during the monsoon, the taluk centre was moved to Puttur. Uppinangady is the 2nd largest urban area in Puttur Taluk.

The town of Uppinangady is situated at an altitude of 53 meters. Uppinangady is also known as "Dakshina Kashi". It is believed that there is also a sangam of a third river along with the other two rivers which is known as Guptagamini. It is famous for the Sahasralingeshwara Temple

== Governance ==
Uppinangady Village is Administered by Grama Panchayat. The area under the Uppinangadi Gram Panchayat's jurisdiction is roughly 10 km. It has six wards with a total membership of 20 people. According to the 2011 Census, there are 1544 families and 7813 people living in the Town overall, including 3901 men and 3912 women. Uppinangady Gram Panchayat is part of the Puttur Taluk Panchayat and the Dakshina Kannada Zilla Panchayat Constituency. Uppinangady village has 4 temples, 3 mosques, 1 church, 6 madrasas, and 2 bhajan mandirs. There is one primary health centre, nine schools, two colleges, and ten Anganwadi Centers, Village Development Project Self Help Group, JCI, Rotary Club, 8 Asha Workers, 2 Fair Price Shops, Primary Agriculture Self Help Group are all under the jurisdiction of Gram Panchayat and work together for the development of the Village. Uppinangady is the major commercial hub for Shiradi to Kodimbadi in the Puttur taluk, Ramakunja, Alankaru, Biliyur to Perne in the Bantwal taluk, and more than 6 grama panchayats in the Belthangadi taluk. Uppinangady is also passed by the national highway that runs between Mangalore and Bangalore. Due to all of these factors, Uppinangady is a thriving business centre. Uppinangadi Gram Panchayat's own grant includes not only house tax but also income from business license of around 700 shops in the town and rent of panchayat buildings. Official Website of Uppinangady Grama Panchayat: http://uppinangadigp.com/

== History ==
Its legend dates back to the time of Mahabharata. The Skanda Purana states that when King Yudhisthira decided to perform the Rajasuya Yagna (to proclaim his sovereignty), he sent Bhima to present day Uppinangady. There, he was attacked by the huge giant animal named Purusha Mruga. To avoid attack, he dropped one of his hairs, which instantly turned into a Shivalinga. Seeing this, Purusha Mruga stopped to worship the Linga & then proceeded to attack. Bhima again dropped a hair, which turned into another Shivalinga. This happened for quite sometime. Finally, he dropped a handful of his hair, which instantly turned into a thousand Shivalingas. Purusha Mruga stopped to worship all the Lingas, giving time to escape. The Sangama (confluence) of Kumaradhara & Netravati rivers happen near the temple. However, during the monsoon, this confluence takes place directly in front of the sanctum sanctorum. It is considered an auspicious moment to bathe in the rivers' waters. It is also said that the 1000 Shivalingas, hidden deep in the sand, are revealed when the sand recedes.

== Transport ==
Uppinangady is at the foothills of the Western Ghats in Dakhshina Kannada district, surrounded by forests. Uppinangady lies on National Highway 75 which connects Mangaluru to Bengaluru. There are frequent bus and taxi service from this place to Mangaluru and its taluk headquarters Puttur and also to Kukke Subramanya. The nearest railway station is Puttur Railway station located at a distance of 12 km. The nearest airport is Mangalore International airport 55 km away.
