= Subramanya, Karnataka =

Village in Dakshina Kannada district, India

Subramanya
- village
- Location in Karnataka, India
- Coordinates: 12.663808°N 75.615361°E
- Country: India
- State: Karnataka
- District: Dakshina Kannada
- Taluk: Kadaba
- Elevation: 120 m (390 ft)

Population
  - Total: 4,443

Languages
  - Official: Kannada,Tulu
  - Other Regional languages: Arebhashe
- Time zone: UTC+5:30 (IST)
- Vehicle registration: KA-21

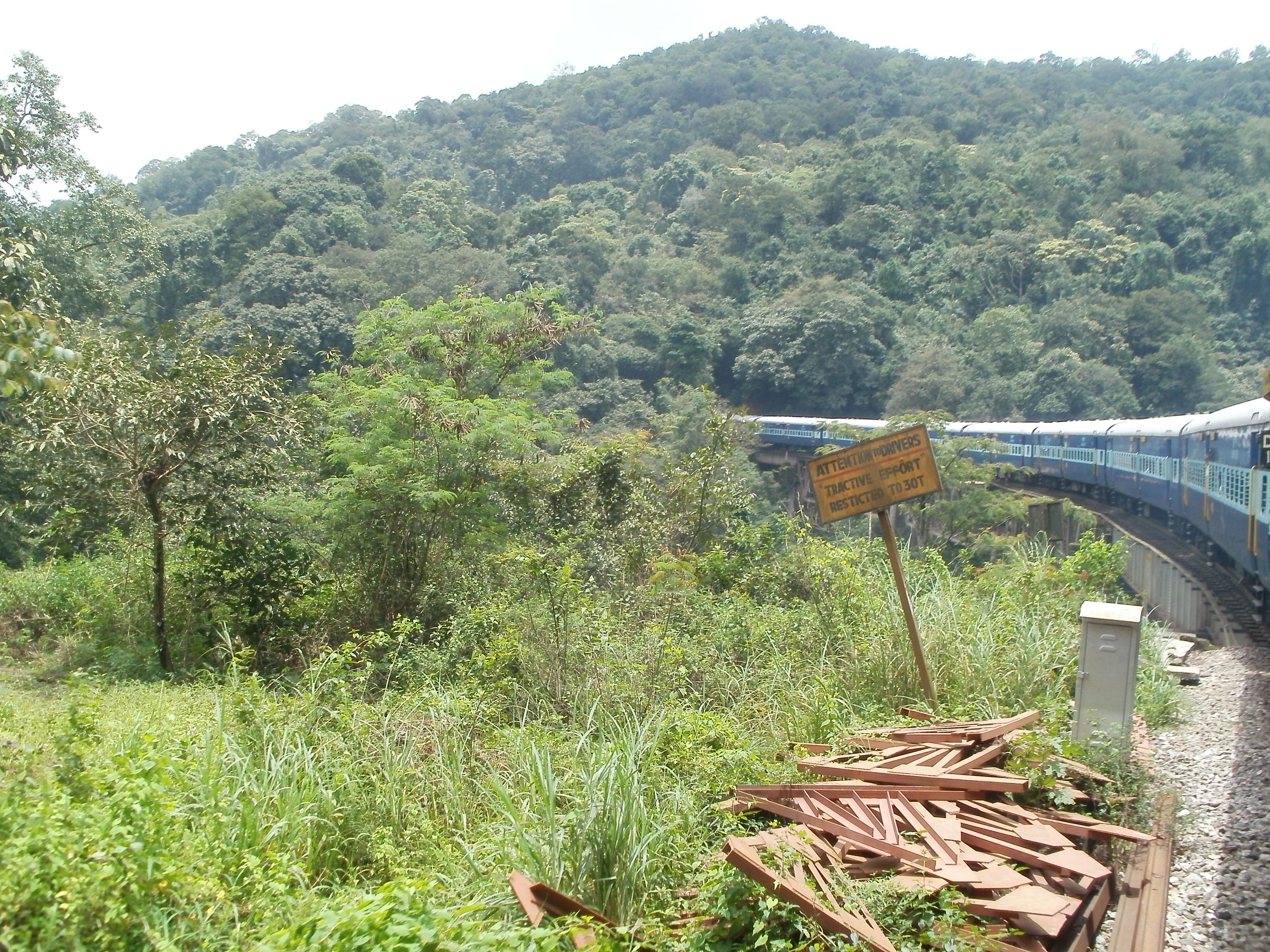
Subramanya to Sakleshpur

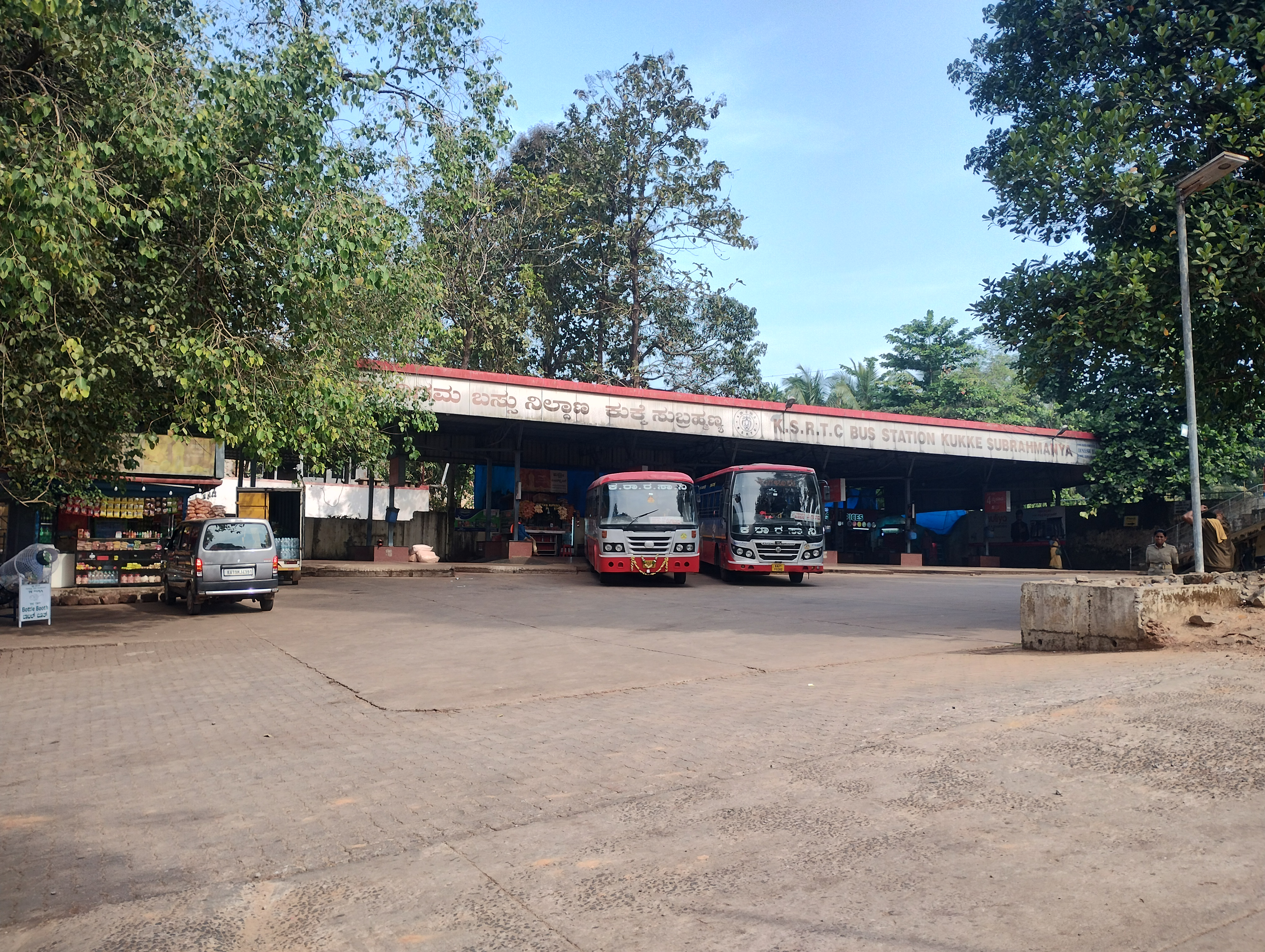
Bus stand in Kukke Subramanya (2025)

Subramanya is a village located in Kadaba Taluk in Dakshina Kannada, India. The Kukke Subrahmanya Temple is located here. It is about 105 kilometres (65 mi) from Mangalore, connected by train and road. It was originally named "Kukke Pattana".

== Pilgrim centre ==
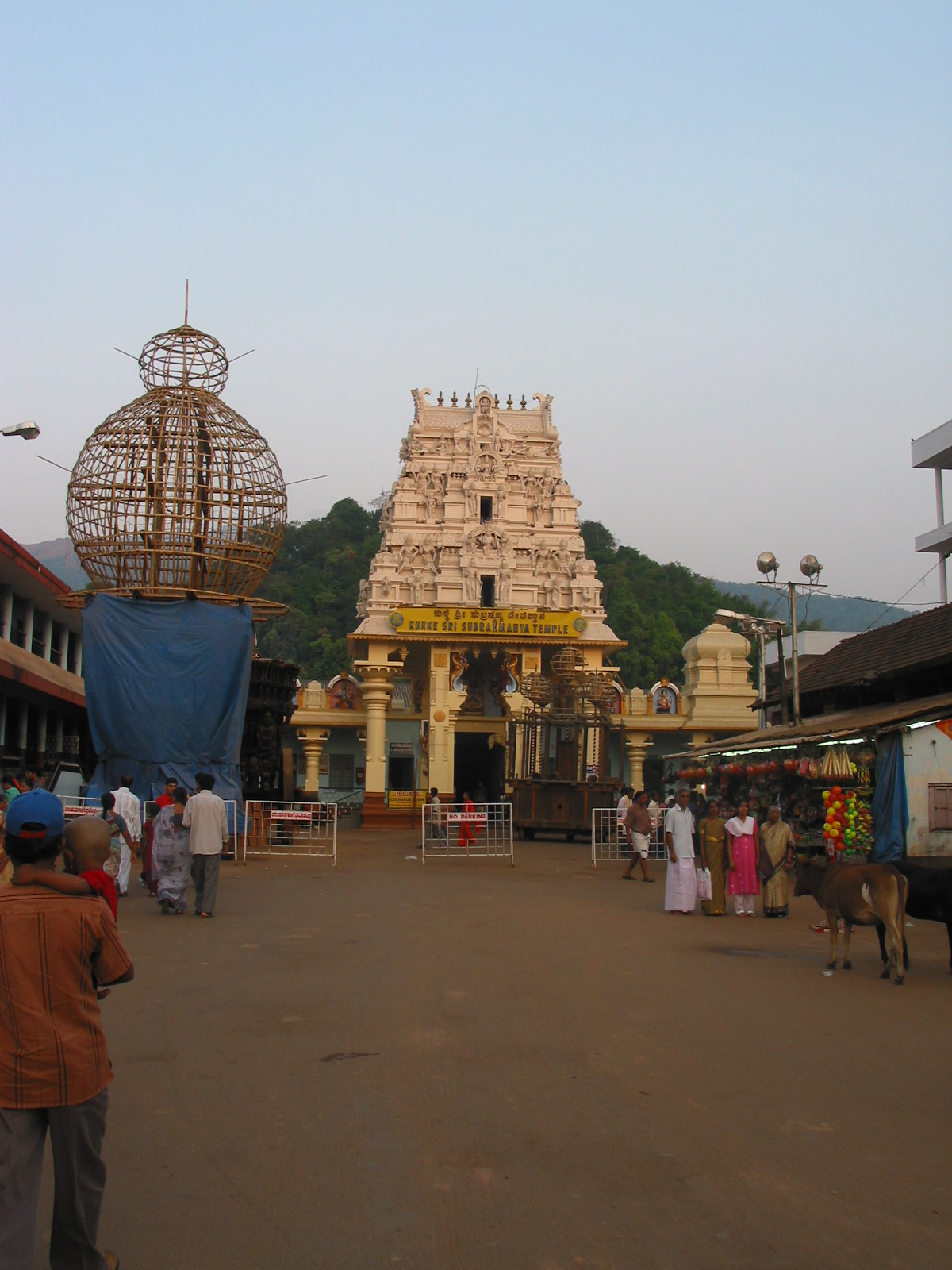
Gopuram of Kukke Subramanya Temple

The village is an approach and resting point for pilgrims visiting the Kukke Subrahmanya Temple in Subrahmanya. The village is surrounded by the Kumaradhara River. The Darpana Theertha, a tributary of the Kumaradhara, flows just behind the temple.

The belief is that Vasuki and other snakes took refuge under the god Subrahmanya in the caves at Subramanya. Here Subrahmanya is worshipped as a snake.

== See also ==
- Sullia
- Puttur
- Mangalore
