= Gurupura =

- town
- Location in Karnataka, India
- Coordinates: 12.938828°N 74.931107°E
- Country: India
- State: Karnataka
- District: Dakshina Kannada

Government
  - Body: Mooluru Grama Panchayath

Population (2011)
  - Total: 5,465

Languages
  - Official: Tulu
- Time zone: UTC+5:30 (IST)
- PIN: 574145
- Nearest city: Mangalore
- Lok Sabha constituency: Mangalore
- Vidhan Sabha constituency: Mangalore North
- Civic agency: Mooluru Grama Panchayath

Gurupura, Karnataka, India is a small town situated on the Phalguni, or Gurupura River. It is located about 345 kilometres (214 miles) west of Bangalore, the state capital, and 13 kilometres (8 miles) east of Mangalore, Karnataka's chief port city.

The inhabitants of Gurupura come from various cultural backgrounds, and include Billava, Bunts, Gowda Saraswath Brahmins and Veerashaivas. Tulu is the primary language for general communication, but Konkani, Beary and Kannada are also spoken.

== History ==
According to the records of the local temples, the town of Gurupura was once known as Gulipur. Being situated on the banks of the Phalguni River, Gulipur was a commercial town and was connected to other parts of the river. Bandasaale was, and still is, a place on this river where goods are collected from many sources and distributed to other places.

The 'Bangla gudde', a dam-like structure built as a drinking water supply, was built in Gurupura by Tipu Sultan.

There are many devasthana and daivasthana in and around Gurupura. The best known are Shree Varadaraja venkataramana temple, Shri Neelakanteshwara Temple, Shri Agnidurgha Gopalakrishna Mahakaala Bhairava Temple, Sadhashiva Temple, Somanatha Temple, Venkataramana Temple, Annapoorneshwari Temple, Narasimha Temple, Sathyadevatha Temple, Mundithaya temple and Arasu Mundithaya Temple.

The history also says that around 1000 years ago nath panth saints who originated from North India settled in Gurupura which was the result for evolution of some of these temples.

== Religious sites ==
Gurupura is famous for its religious activities, and the Phalguni River is also named Gurupura, after this town. It also lies close to Vamanjoor and Kaikamba. The village has become a small town with the rapid urbanisation of the Dakshina Kannada district.

Temples of the Hindu deities Varadraja Venkatramana and Shri Satyadevta Dharmadevta are found here. The devastan of Shri Satyadevta is also well known in and around Gurupura. Festivals take place here through most of the year, but the main festival usually takes place in April or May, in the month of the Indian calendar called "Gurpur Teru", followed by "Ookul", after "Odu Teru". Just across the road from the Sri Satyadevata Dharmadevata Temple is a large mosque.

== Nearby places ==
- 12 km (7.5 mi) from Mangalore City
- 05 km (3.1 mi) from Kaikamba
- 28 km (17 mi) from National Institute of Technology Karnataka
- 29 km (18 mi) from Surathkal
- 00 km (0 mi) from Phalguni River
- 66 km (41 mi) from Udupi
