= Yennehole =

- Village
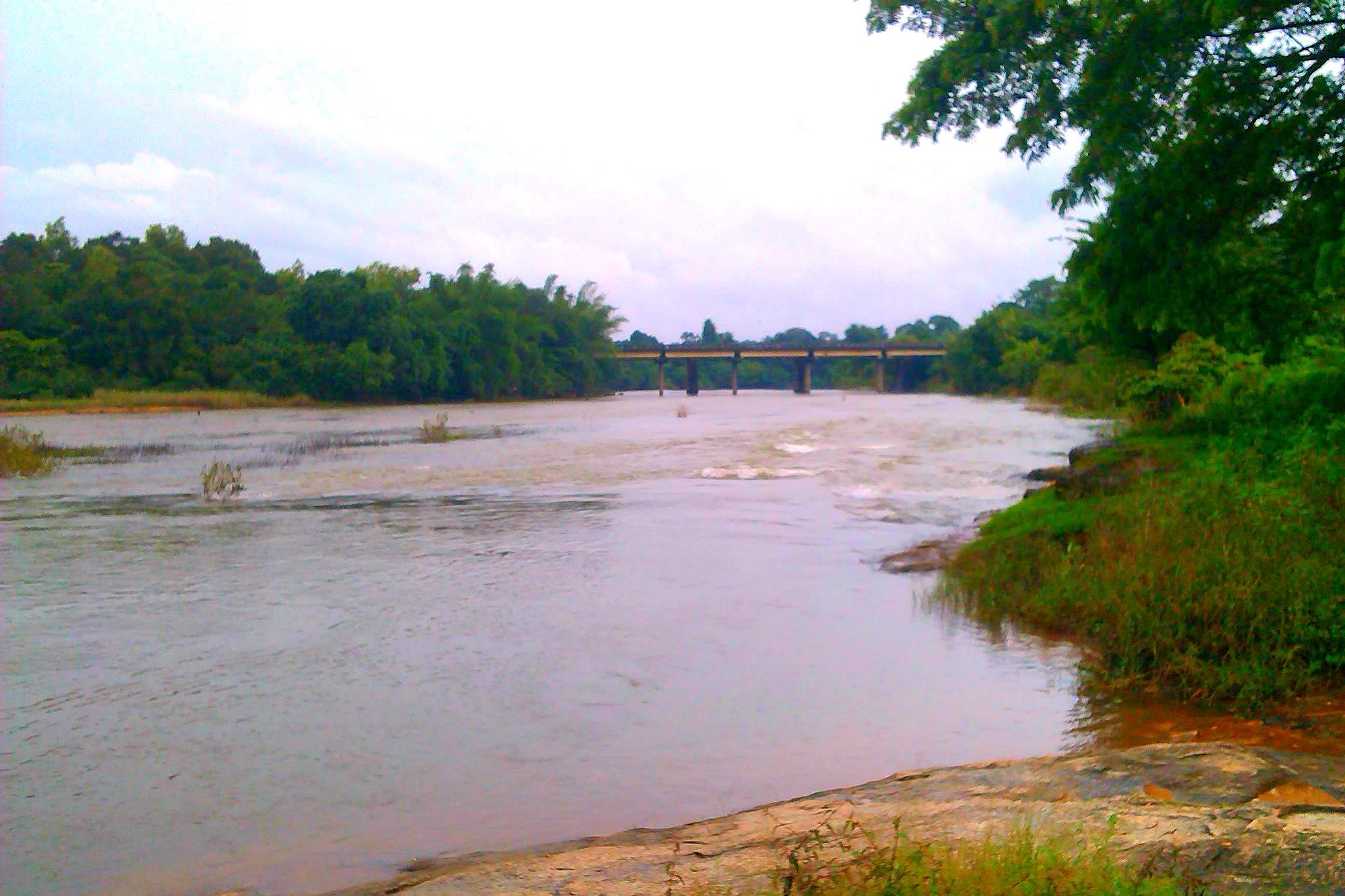
- Scenic View of the Yennehole River as well as the Yennehole Bridge from the Village

- Yennehole Location in Karnataka, India Yennehole (India)
- Coordinates: 13.2151087°N 74.9961709°E
- Country: India
- State: Karnataka
- District: Udupi
- Taluka: Karkala
- Elevation: 20 m (66 ft)

Languages
  - Languages Spoken: Tulu, Konkani, Kannada
- Time zone: UTC+5:30 (IST)
- PIN: 574101
- Telephone Code: 08253

Yennehole is a small village near Ajekar in Karkala taluk of Udupi district in India. There is a small river, Swarna, running through this village by same name. It is 75 kilometres (47 mi) from the city of Mangalore.

Daya Nayak of the Mumbai Police is native to Yennehole. It houses a temple known as Sri Adhishakthi Temple which one of the oldest temples in Udupi.

It has Yennehole Litt Irrigation project which caters to 1500 hectares. The project also rejuvenated two lakes. The 125 m long barrage has 19 vents and is expected to impound water up to 4 m (1.85 million cubic metres). It has a 125 meter-wide barrage.
