= Addur =

- village

- Location in Karnataka, India Addur (India)
- Coordinates: 12.87°N 74.84°E
- Country: India
- State: Karnataka
- District: Dakshina Kannada
- Talukas: Mangalore

Government
  - Body: Gram panchayat

Population (2001)
  - Total: 5,132

Languages
  - Official: Kannada[Beary] [Tulu] [Kannada] Urdu
- Time zone: UTC+5:30 (IST)
- Postal code: addur post
- ISO 3166 code: IN-KA
- Vehicle registration: KA
- Website: karnataka.gov.in

Addur is a village in the southern state of Karnataka, India. It is located in the Mangalore taluk of Dakshina Kannada district.

== Demographics ==
As of 2001 India census, Addur had a population of 5,132 with 2,565 males and 2,567 females.

== See also ==
- Dakshina Kannada
- Districts of Karnataka
- Mangalore
