= Parkala =

- Suburb
- Location in Karnataka, India
- Coordinates: 13°21′13″N 74°49′10″E
- Country: India
- State: Karnataka
- District: Udupi
- City: Udupi

Government
  - Body: Udupi City Municipal Council/Local Panchayats

Languages
  - Official: Tulu Kannada Konkani
- Time zone: UTC+5:30 (IST)
- PIN: 576107
- Nearest city: Manipal
- Lok Sabha constituency: Udupi Chikmagalur (Lok Sabha constituency)
- Vidhan Sabha constituency: Udupi and Kaup
- Civic agency: Udupi City Municipal Council/Local Panchayats
- Major Political Party Stronghold: Bharatiya Janata Party
- Climate: Summer: Hot/humid, Monsoon: Typically heavy rains, Winter: Cool, breezy (Köppen)

Parkala is a suburb of Udupi city located east of Manipal in Udupi district of Karnataka, India. It is administered in part by Udupi City Municipality and in part by the 80, Badagubettu Panchayat (village-level local government body).

== Description ==
Parkala, along the banks of the Swarna River, is surrounded by paddy fields, coconut and arecanut plantations, and forests. Gatson colony the most famous colony in Udupi is located in Parkala. Gatson colony comes within the range of 2 km from Parkala. Gatson colony is the most advanced colony in udupi district, many innovations like underground telephone line or underground water pipes were first introduced there.

This town is situated on the Udupi-Karkala state highway, right next to the internationally renowned Manipal city, the knowledge hub of southern India, where students from all over India and the world come to pursue higher studies in subjects ranging from medicine to technology to management. From Udupi city, famous for its Shri Krishna Temple, Parkala is about seven km.

Parkala has ancient temples, a mosque, besides schools—one of them, the Basel Mission School, which is more than 100 years old—hospitals and clinics, and a popular weekly market, called the Santhe in local lingo.

A software firm also dots the landscape along with mobile and landline towers of major telephone companies. There are many restaurants and bars and a hotel for those wishing to stay in this area.

The town has paddy fields as well as coconut and arecanut groves. Farmers in the area cultivate a variety of crops.

Besides the farming community, who live here in large numbers, many locals commute from here mainly to Udupi and Manipal to their place of work, whether in banks, hospitals or in one of Manipal's various educational campuses.

Parkala is connected by road and railway, the nearest railway station being the Udupi Railway Station on the Konkan Railway, linking Mangalore with Goa and Bombay. Similarly, the National Highway links Udupi with Mangalore to the south and Goa and Bombay to the north. Currently a Major National Highway Project (NH 169A) is being executed, starting from Devinagar, Parkala to Karavali Bypass, Udupi.

Parkala is served by a Post Office with the PIN 576107, serving Parkala, Herga, Badagubettu, Hirebettu, Athrady, Kabyadi and so on. A telephone exchange is situated at Herga, with the STD calling code (+91) 820.

== Languages ==
Tulu, Kannada, Konkani, Urdu and Beary are widely spoken here.

== Art, culture, & sports ==
Bhuta Kola and Nagaradhane are some of the cultural traditions of Parkala, like elsewhere across the coastal Karnataka region. Folk arts like Yakshagana are also popular, with a local team of artists winning state and other awards. The famous Netaji Sports Club (R.) was established in 1975 at Parkala.

== Climate ==
The summers (February–May) are hot/humid, winters (October–January) are cool, and the monsoon (June–September) sees some fairly heavy rains.

== River Swarna ==
Swarna river at Parkala

The River Swarna is a rain-fed water source. Water is tapped at two small dams, one at Baje near Hiriyadka and the other near Shiroor, where it is taken through filtration plants and supplied to many towns and villages, including Parkala, besides being Udupi City's main drinking water source. Swarna also supplies water to many villages along its banks for agricultural purposes.

== Agriculture ==
Agriculture is the main occupation of a sizeable population of residents of Parkala. The main produce is paddy, coconut, arecanut, and a variety of vegetables.

== Transportation ==
The closest railway station is Udupi, 8 km from Parkala. The nearest international airport is at Bajpe in Mangalore. Parkala is connected by public and private transport to major cities in Karnataka, Goa and Maharashtra.

== Schools ==
Basel Mission School [Urban area], popularly known as B.M. School, is over 100 years old. Kannada (up to 8th) and English (up to 10th) are languages of instruction. Another popular school is the Parkala High School, imparting education in Kannada and English from 8th to 10th standard.

== Medical institutions ==
S.D.M. Yoga and Nature Cure Hospital, Pareeka.

== Corporates ==
Telenetix Private Limited, Puthur Hills, Parkala

== Temples ==
Sri Mahalingeshwara Mahaganapathi Temple, Parkala

== People ==
Sri Srinivasa Upadhya, Parkala, Managing Trustee, Sri Mahalingeshwara Mahaganapathi Temple

Late Dr. Giridhara Rao, Physician

Dr N R Rao, International editor for Davidson's Textbook of Medicine

== Auditoriums ==
Sri Vighneshwara Sabha Bhavana, Parkala is a hub of various cultural programmes. Art forms like Yakshagana and various other theatre form of entertainment can be witnessed all year round. The Sabha Bhavana hosts its own Ganesh Chaturthi inviting over thousands of devotees across the district.

== See also ==
- Udupi
- Manipal
- Udupi district
- Karnataka
