= Kaniyuru =

Kaniyooru
- Village
- Location in Karnataka, India Kaniyooru (India)
- Coordinates: 12°43′07″N 75°21′54″E
- Country: India
- State: Karnataka
- District: Mangalore

Government
  - Body: Gram panchayat

Languages
  - Official: Tulu, Kannada
- Time zone: UTC+5:30 (IST)
- PIN: 574328
- ISO 3166 code: IN-KA
- Vehicle registration: KA
- Nearest city: Puttur
- Lok Sabha constituency: Mangalore
- Website: karnataka.gov.in

Kaniyooru, also spelled Kaniyuru, is a village in Kadaba taluk in Dakshina Kannada district of Karnataka state, India. It houses one of the Ashta Mathas established by Madhvacharya, the Dvaita philosopher. The village is located on Mangalore to Bangalore broadguage railway line. There is a railway station at Kaniyooru. The railway station of Kaniyooru (Station code:KNYR) can be accessed by passenger trains running between Mangaluru and Subramanya road stations on Mangalore–Hassan–Mysore line. The Karnataka state highway 100 (SH-100) connecting Puttur to Kukke Subramanya passes through this village. There are frequent buses from Puttur to Kaniyooru to Kukke subhramanya.

== Kaniyoor Matha ==
Shri Kaniyoor Matha or Kaniyur Mutt is one among the eight Mathas (which are popularly known as Ashta Matha) established by Shri Madhvacharya. Shri Rama Theertha, a direct disciple of Shri Madhvacharya, is the first pontiff of Kaniyoor Matha. Since then, there have been 29 pontiffs who have ably led Kaniyooru Matha and added to the glory of Matha. Shri Rama Theertha, the first pontiff of Kaniyoor Matha, was given the idol of Shri Yoganarasimha, which is being worshipped with utmost respect and devotion as the main deity of Kaniyoor Matha. At present, Shri Vidyavallabha Theertha Swamiji shripadaru is heading Kaniyoor Matha.

== Guru Parampara of Kaniyoor Matha ==
1. Sri Madhvacharya
2. Sri Rama Teertha
3. Sri Raghunatha Teertha
4. Sri Raghupathi Teertha
5. Sri Raghunandana Teertha
6. Sri Yadunandana Teertha
7. Sri Vishvanatha Teertha
8. Sri Vedagarbha Teertha
9. Sri Vageesha Teertha
10. Sri Varadapathi Teertha
11. Sri Vishwapathi Teertha
12. Sri Vishwamoorthi Teertha
13. Sri Vedapathi Teertha
14. Sri Vedaraja Teertha
15. Sri Vidyadheesha Teertha
16. Sri Vibhudesha Teertha
17. Sri Varijaksha Teertha
18. Sri Vishwendra Teertha
19. Sri Vibhudavandya Teertha
20. Sri Vibhudadhiraja Teertha
21. Sri Vidyaraja Teertha
22. Sri Vibhudapriya Teertha
23. Sri Vidyasagara Teertha
24. Sri Vasudeva Teertha
25. Sri Vidyapathi Teertha
26. Sri Vamana Teertha
27. Sri Vidyanidhi Teertha
28. Sri Vidyasamudra Teertha
29. Sri Vidyavarinidhi Teertha
30. Sri Vidyavallabha Teertha(Present Pontiff)

== See also ==
- Kaniyur, Tamil Nadu
- Kaniyur, Coimbatore
