= Ganjimutt =

- Town
- Nickname: Badagulipady
- Country: India
- State: Karnataka
- District: Dakshina Kannada

Government
  - Type: Panchayat
  - Body: Ganjimutt Panchayat.

Languages
  - Official: Kannada
- Time zone: UTC+5:30 (IST)
- PIN: Ganjimutt 574 144/45
- Telephone code: 0824
- Vehicle registration: KA 19

Ganjimutt or Ganjimata is a town in Mangalore Taluk, central government will establish plastic park total coast 62.77 crores in 104 acreDakshina Kannada district, Karnataka state, West coast of India. It is almost 18 km east of Mangalore, connected with NH 169 (formerly NH13).
