= Kumaradhara River =

River in Karnataka, India

Coordinates: 13.8333°N 76.0833°E

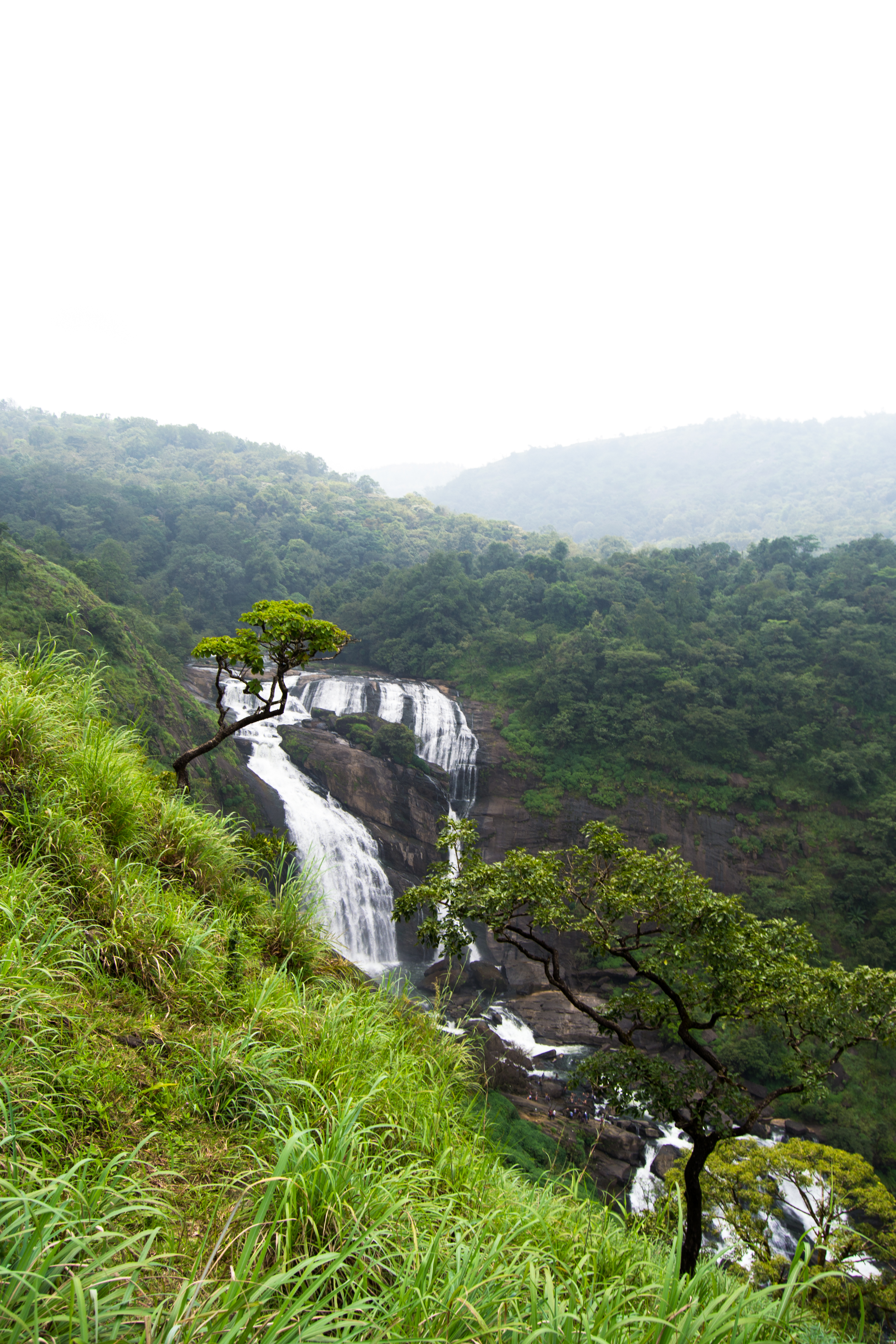
Mallalli falls of the river

The Kumaradhara River is a west-flowing river in the state of Karnataka, India. One of the two major rivers of Sullia, it merges with the Netravati River at Uppinangadi before flowing to the Arabian Sea. The merging of the rivers is a major event for the local villagers, as they crowd the river banks to watch what they call the "Sangama", which is a Sanskrit word for confluence.

This river is the chief tributary of Netravathi. Kumaradhara originates in Bagthi betta, Pushpagiri Wildlife Sanctuary in Kodagu district, at an elevation of 1,600 metres (5,200 ft) above mean sea level. Along its course it creates the Mallalli falls. It passes through lush evergreen forest of Bisle Valley, fed by numerous smaller streams. It merges into Netravati at Uppinangadi in Dakshin Kannada at an elevation of 40 metres above the MSL. The total length of river is about 80 kilometres.

The river passes through two major towns; Kukke Subrahmanya and Uppinangadi.

== Practise ==
It is believed that pilgrims visiting the Kukke Subrahmanya Temple in Subramanya must cross the Kumaradhara River, taking a holy bath in it before they go on to the temple to have Darśana.
