= Netravati River =

River in Karnataka, India

Coordinates: 12°50′N 74°52′E

Nethravati River
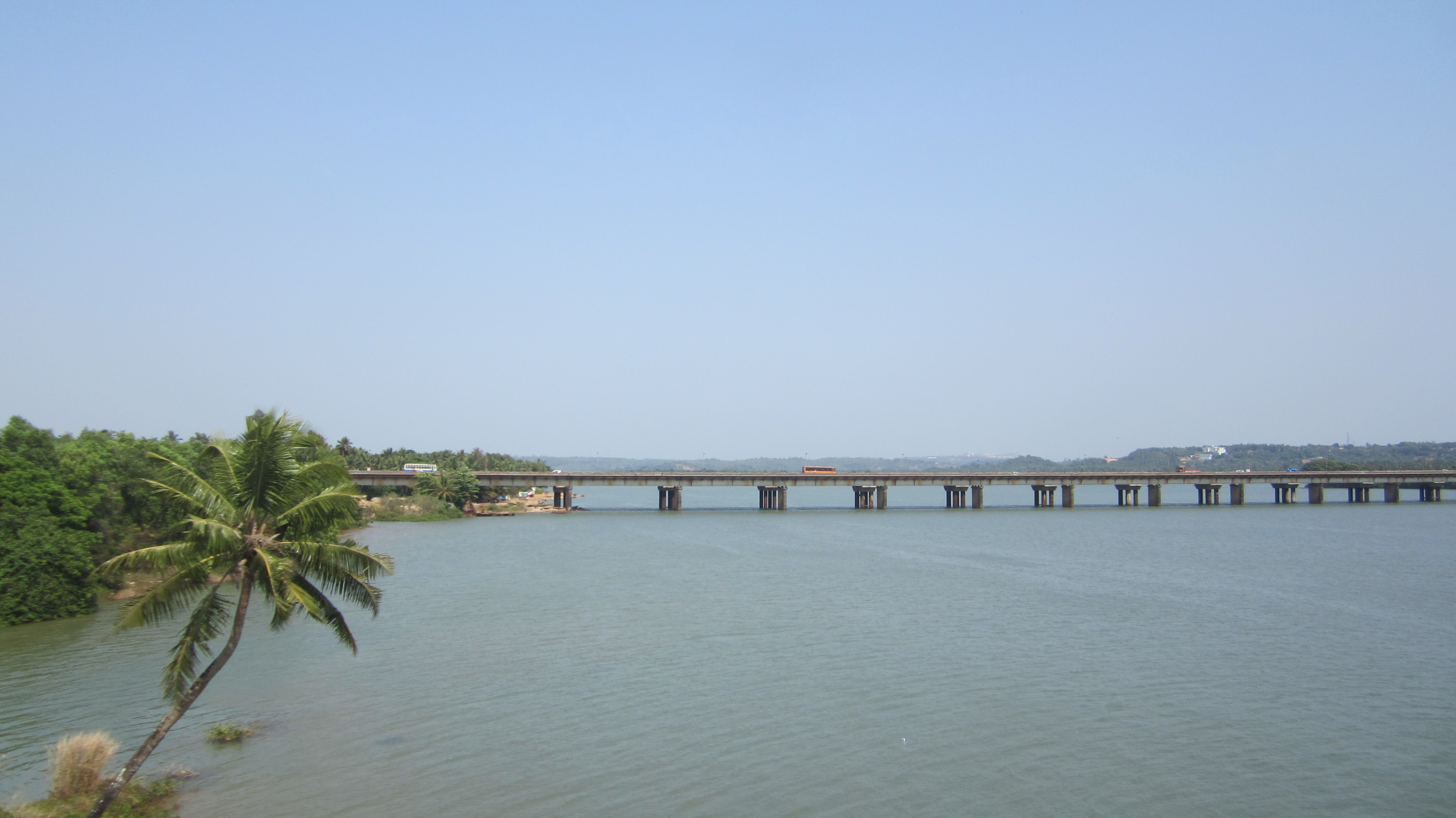

Location
- Country: India

Physical characteristics
- Source
  - location: Gangamoola, Chikmagalur district, Karnataka
- Mouth
  - location: Arabian Sea
- Length: 106 Km

The Netravati River or Netravathi Nadi has its origins at Bangrabalige valley, Yelaneeru Ghat in Kudremukha in Chikkamagaluru district of Karnataka, India. This river flows through the famous pilgrimage place Dharmasthala and is considered one of the holy rivers of India. It merges with the Kumaradhara River at Uppinangadi before flowing to the Arabian Sea, south of Mangalore city. This river is the main source of water to Bantwal and Mangalore.

Earlier in the 20th century it was known as the Bantwal River, the town of Bantwal is seen on its banks. A reference to the River Netravati, as unfordable during the South-West Monsoon, can be seen in the Gazetteer of Southern India,, published in 1855. It has an apparent breadth of about 200 yards with a bed encumbered by large rocky masses, chiefly of hornblende rock, containing spangles of mica and small garnets. Sienites also occur, as fragments of a beautiful pegmatite with flesh coloured feldspar are seen in the beds of rivulets. The Netravati River is navigable by small country craft for many miles. The train Netravati Express, passing through Mangalore, is named after this river.

Often Bantwal has been submerged in bygone years during the monsoon by overflowing river Netravati. Many residents left the town, settled elsewhere, and prospered. The major floods remembered by the elders of the town occurred in 1928 and 1974.

== Course ==
Netravati river originates in the Western Ghats in Bangrabalike forest Valley in Yellaner Ghats of Kudremukha range in Karnataka State. The river drains an area of about 1,353 square miles. The Kumaradhara River, which originates in the Subramanya range of Western Ghats, meets the Netravati river at Uppinangadi. Every year nearly around more than 100 tmc of water flowing to Arabian sea.

== Agriculture and fishing ==
The main occupations of the people who have settled on the bank of this river are agriculture and fishing. This river is the main source of water for agriculture during off monsoon. The river is rich in water life. Majority of the people settling around the river have practiced fishing which provides bread to many families. People also trade fine sand which is used for construction. This sand is taken from the bed of the river.

== Controversy ==
Many mini hydroelectric projects and diversion project have been set up on this river, causing damage to environment of this ecologically sensitive region; and more projects are in the planning stages and some are implemented. A recent controversy has arisen, from a proposal to change the path of the river so that the dry land areas above the Western Ghats can be irrigated. Changing the path of the river might lead to unforeseen environmental disasters according to some experts. For example, it might affect the marine life due to reduced outflow of freshwater and the subsequent decline of nutrients flowing into the sea. This apart from the loss in contiguity of rainforests in Western Ghats. Also some opposition has arisen to the proposed hydro electric projects on Netravati river.

== Gallery ==
Netravati river
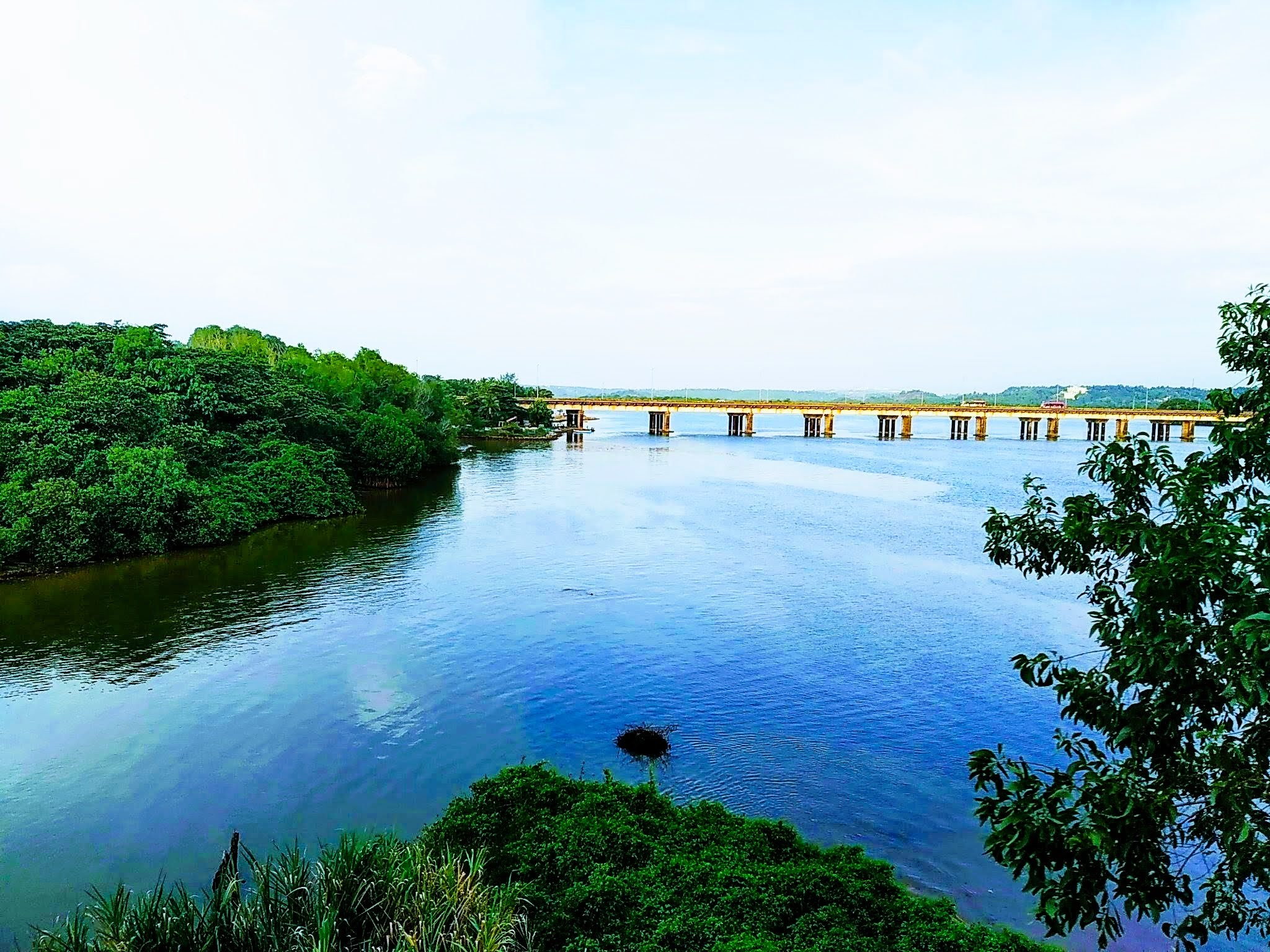
View of the Netravati River from a train

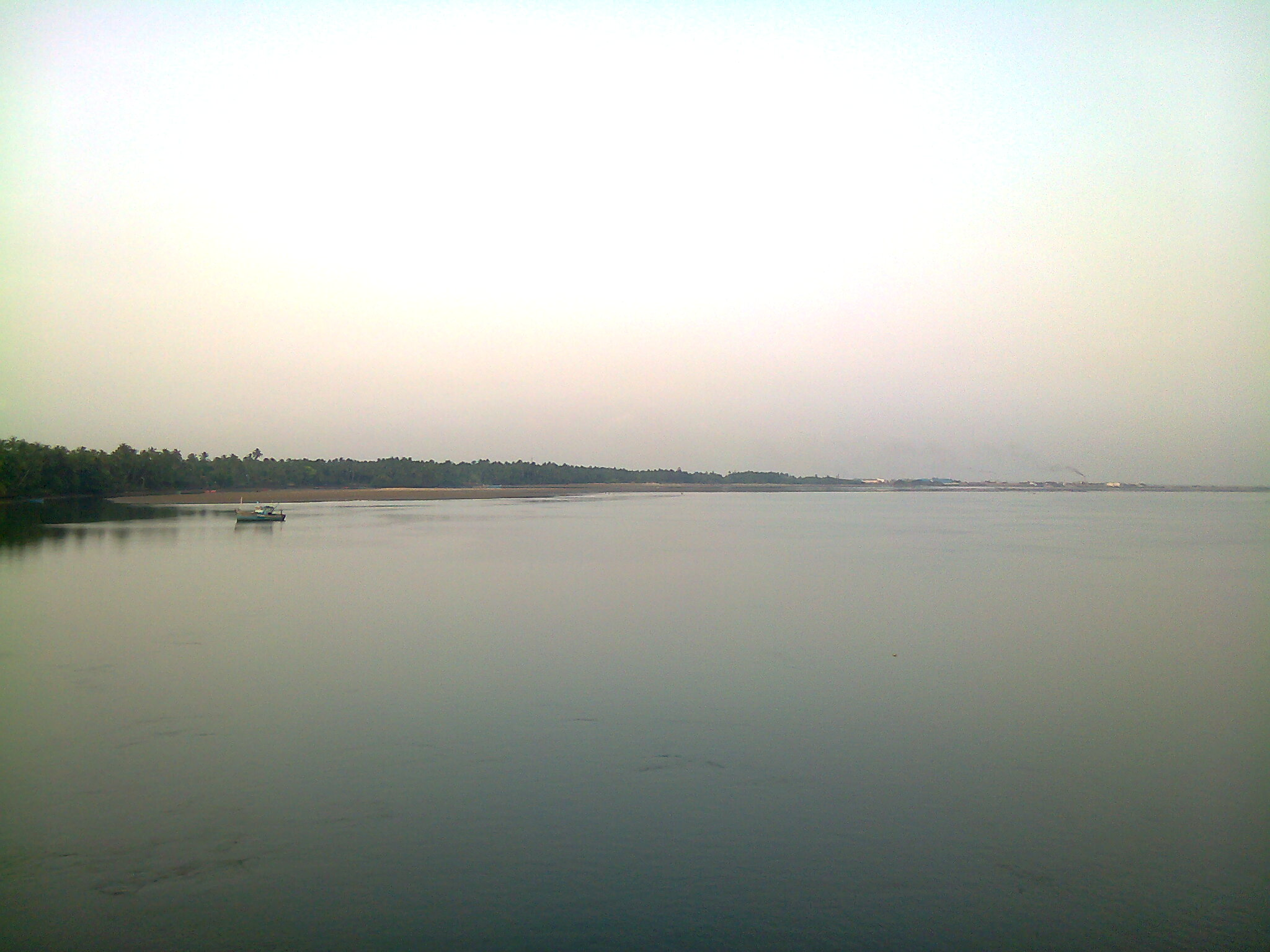
Netravati River in Mangalore

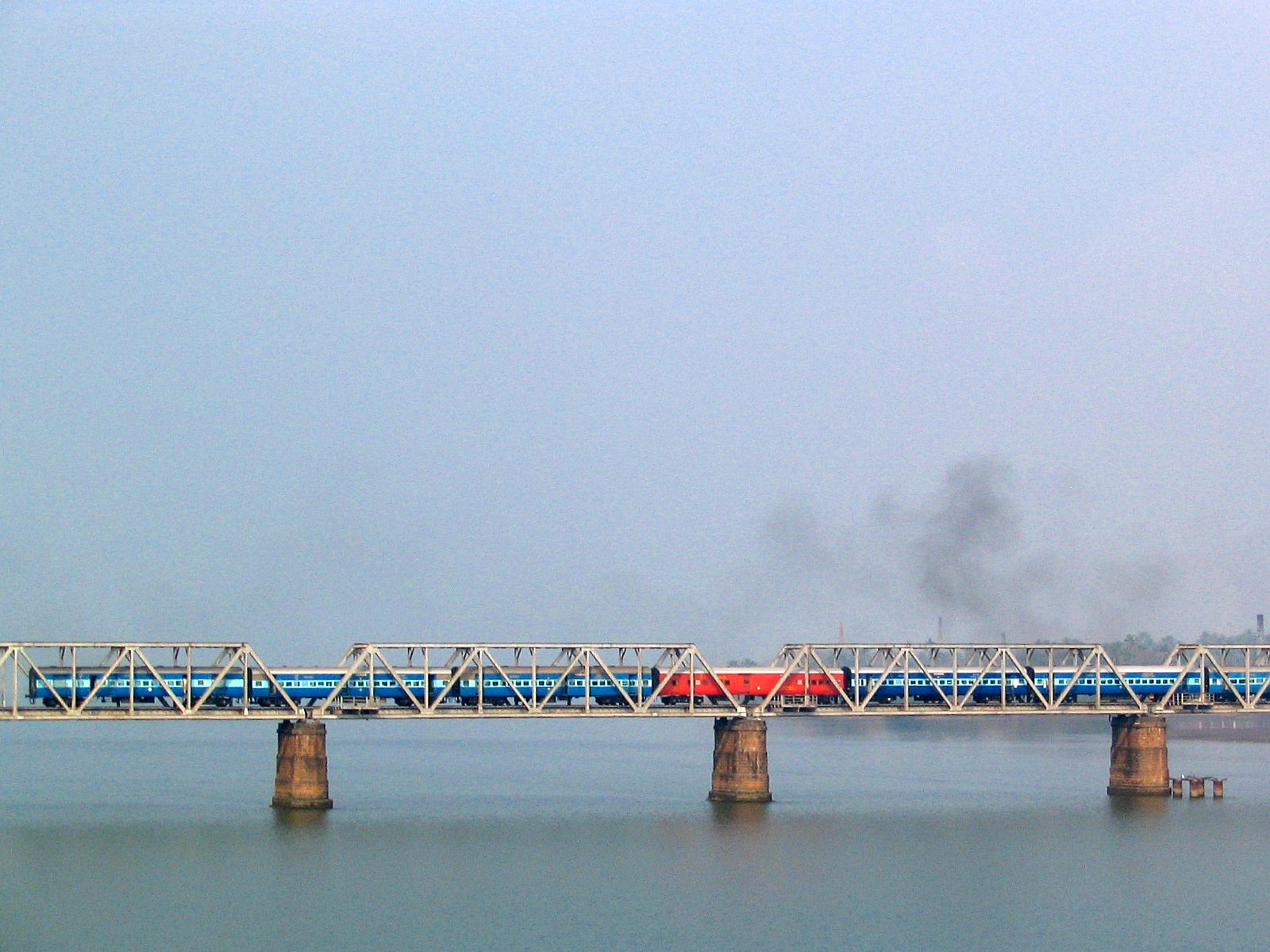
Netravati railway bridge as a gateway to Mangalore

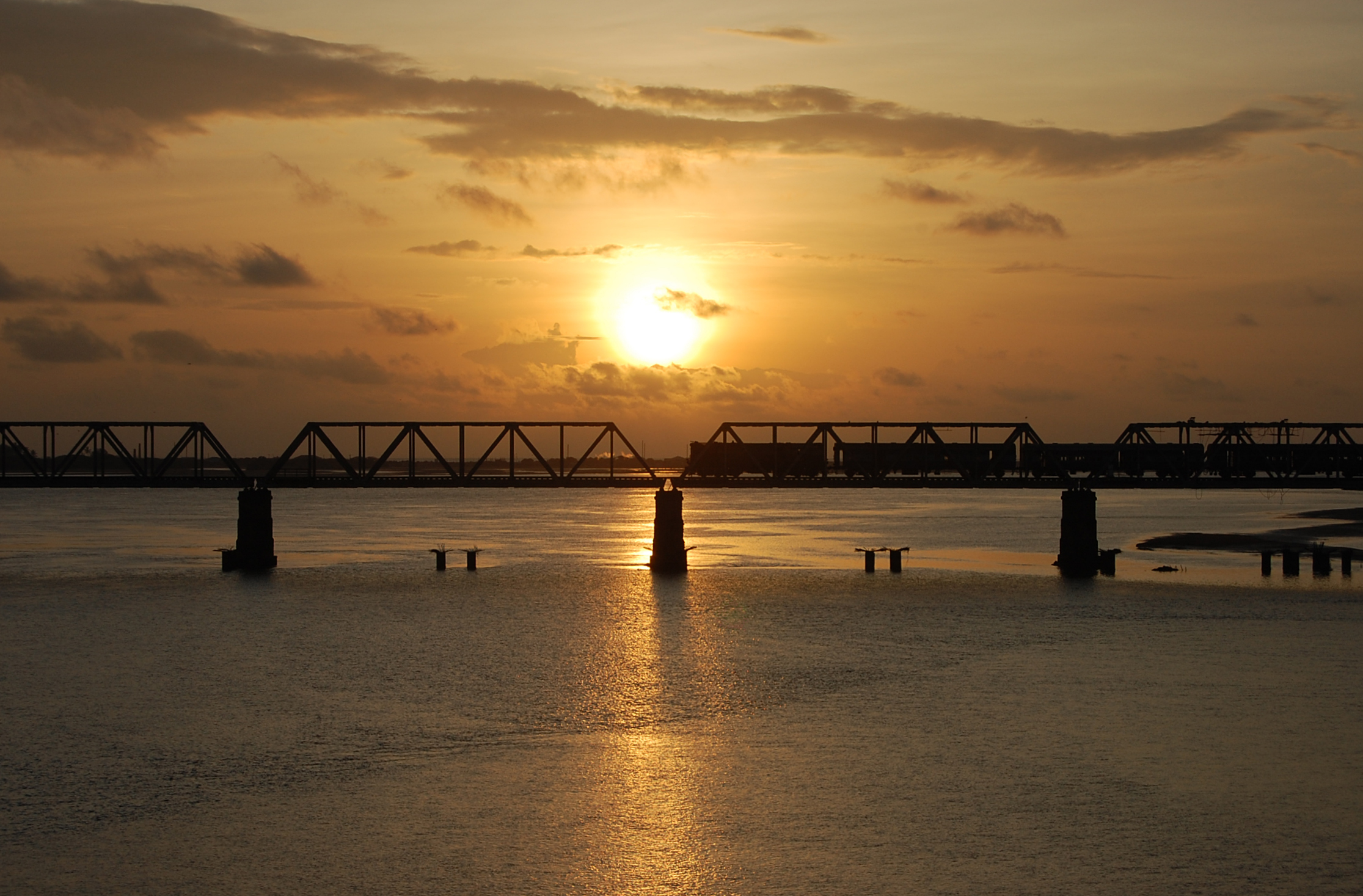
Ullal Bridge on Nethravathi River Mangalore

== See also ==
- List of rivers of Dakshina Kannada and Udupi districts
