= Kukke Subramanya Temple =

Hindu temple in Karnataka

- Kukke Sri Subramanya Temple
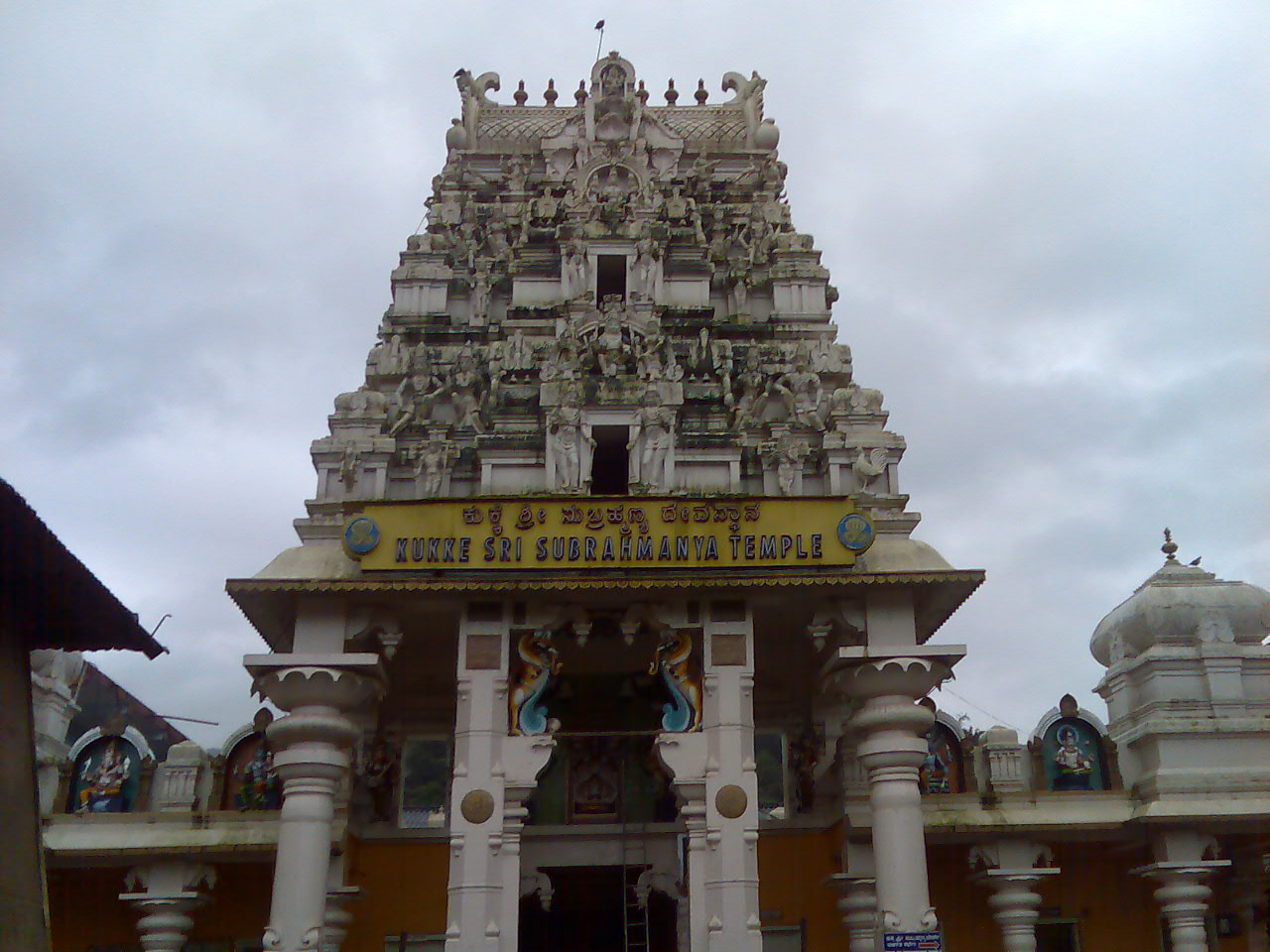
- The Gopura of the Temple

Religion
- Affiliation: Hinduism
- District: Dakshina Kannada
- Deity: Kartikeya as a Nāga
- Festivals: Shasti, Kiru Shasti, Nagara Panchami, Nagaradhane

Location
- Location: On banks of river Kumaradhara
- State: Karnataka
- Country: India
- Interactive map of Kukke Subramanya Temple
- Coordinates: 12.66°N 75.61°E

Architecture
- Style: Architecture of Karnataka
- Creator: Parashurama

Website
- itms.kar.nic.in/..

Kukke Subramanya (IAST: Kukke Subrahmaṇya) is a Hindu temple on the banks of Kumaradhara River in the village Subramanya in Kadaba taluk (previously in Sullia taluk) in Dakshina Kannada district, Karnataka, India.

The priests in the temple are Shivalli Madhwa Brahmins. The poojas and other daily rituals in the temple are performed as per Madhvacharya's Tantra Sara Sangraha.

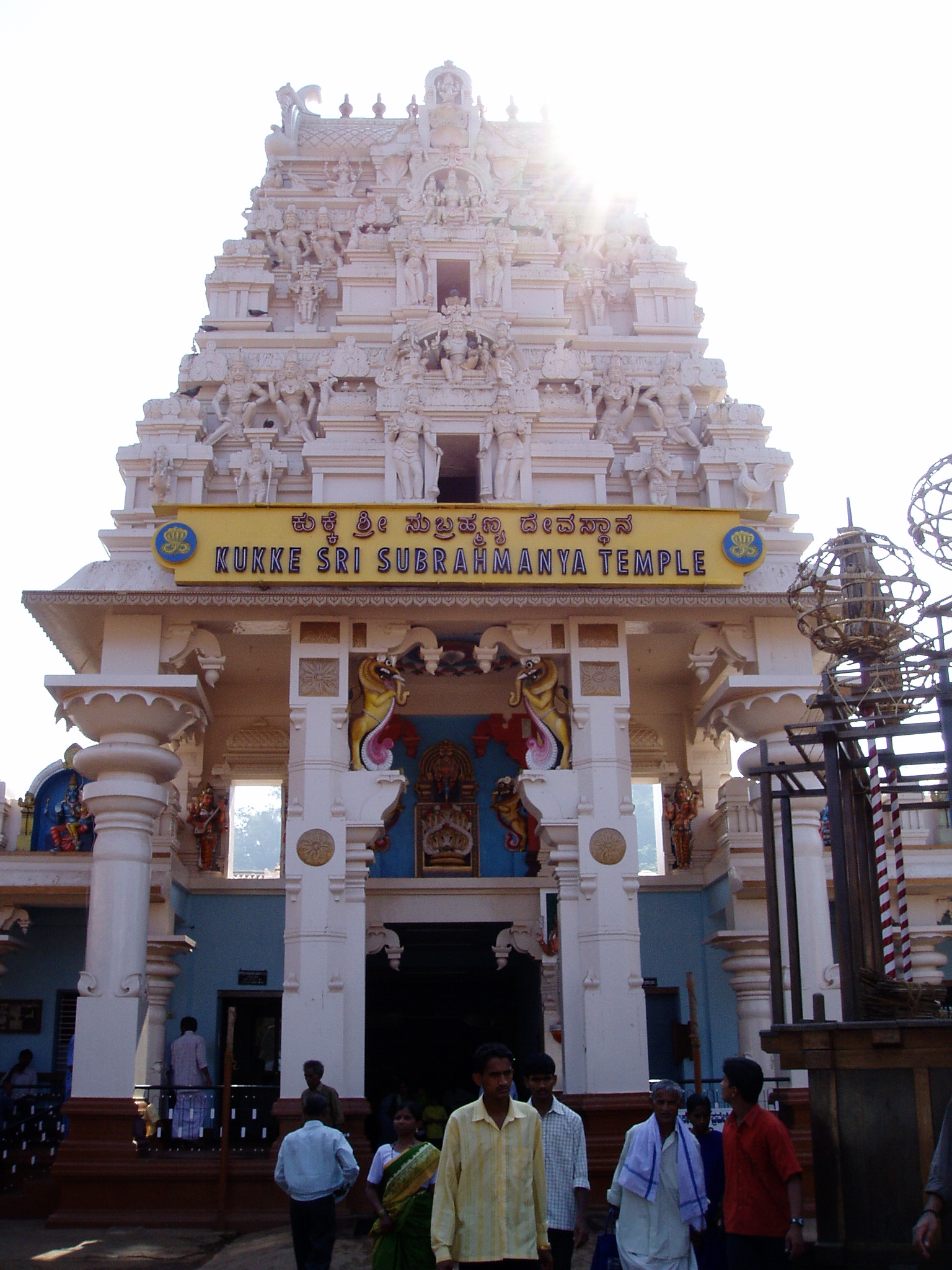
Kukke Subrahmanya Temple
