= Hole Alur railway station =

Railway station in Karnataka, India

Hole Alur Holealooru

General information
- Location: SH 83, Hole Alur-582203 ,Gadag district, Karnataka; India
- Coordinates: 15°49′13″N 75°38′34″E
- Elevation: 543 metres (1,781 ft)
- System: Indian Railways station
- Owner: Indian Railways
- Operator: South Western Railway
- Line: Gadag–Hotgi line
- Platforms: 2
- Tracks: 4

Construction
- Structure type: Standard (on-ground station)
- Parking: No
- Cycle facilities: No

Other information
- Status: Functioning
- Station code: HLAR
- Zone(s): South Western Railway
- Division(s): Hubli

History
- Electrified: Double Line Electrified
Location
- Location within Karnataka

Hole Alur railway station (station code: HLAR) is located in the Hubli railway division of South Western Railway situated in Gadag district, Karnataka, India. Hole Alur railway station features two platforms, primarily serving Holealur Village and nearby villages.

== Major trains ==
Trains that run through/from Hole Alur are:

- Gol Gumbaz Express
- Hubballi–Secunderabad Express
- Hubballi–Varanasi Weekly Express
- Hubballi–Lokmanya Tilak Terminus Express (via Bijapur)
- Yesvantpur–Barmer AC Express
- Solapur–Hubballi Intercity Express
- Solapur–Gadag DEMU Passenger
- Solapur–Dharwad Passenger
- Bijapur–Hubli Passenger
