= Yesvantpur–Vijayapura Express =

Train in India

Yesvantpur - Vijayapura Express

Overview
- Service type: Express
- Status: Active
- Locale: Karnataka
- First service: 8 December 2025; 8 months ago
- Current operator: South Western (SW)

Route
- Termini: Yesvantpur Junction (YPR); Vijayapura (BJP)
- Stops: 23
- Distance travelled: 742 km (461 mi)
- Average journey time: 13h 55m
- Service frequency: Daily
- Train number: 16547 / 16548

On-board services
- Classes: General Unreserved, Sleeper Class, AC 3rd Class
- Seating arrangements: Yes
- Sleeping arrangements: Yes
- Catering facilities: Pantry Car
- Observation facilities: Large windows
- Baggage facilities: No
- Other facilities: Below the seats

Technical
- Rolling stock: ICF coach
- Track gauge: 1,676 mm (5 ft 6 in)
- Electrification: 25 kV 50 Hz AC Overhead line
- Operating speed: 130 km/h (81 mph) maximum, 53 km/h (33 mph) average including halts.
- Track owner: Indian Railways

The 16547 / 16548 Yesvantpur–Vijayapura Express is an Express train belonging to South Western Railway zone that runs between the city Yesvantpur Junction and Vijayapura of Karnataka in India.

It operates as train number 16547 from Yesvantpur Junction to Vijayapura and as train number 16548 in the reverse direction, serving the states of Karnataka.

== Services ==
- 16547/ Yesvantpur–Vijayapura Express has an average speed of 53 km/h and covers 742 km in 13h 55m.
- 16548/ Vijayapura–Yesvantpur Express has an average speed 48 km/h and covers 742 km in 15h 20m.

== Routes and halts ==
The Important Halts of the train are :

- Yesvantpur Junction
- Tumkur
- Tiptur
- Arsikere Junction
- Kadur Junction
- Hosadurga Road
- Chikjajur Junction
- Davangere
- Harapanahalli
- Kotturu
- Hagaribommanahalli
- Mariyammanahalli
- Hosapete Junction
- Koppal
- Gadag Junction
- Mallapur
- Hole Alur
- Badami
- Guledagudda Road
- Bagalkot
- Almatti
- Basavana Bagewadi Road
- Vijayapura

== Schedule ==
- 16547 - 9:30 PM (Daily) [Yesvantpur Junction]
- 16548 - 1:50 PM (Daily) [Vijayapura]

== Coach composition ==
- General Unreserved - 4
- Sleeper - 4
- AC 3rd Class - 1

== Traction ==
As the entire route uses diesel, it is hauled by a Krishnarajapuram a shed-based WDP-4 diesel locomotive from Yesvantpur Junction to Vijayapura and vice versa.

== Rake reversal ==
The train will reverse one time, at Hosapete Junction.

== See also ==
- Yesvantpur–Delhi Sarai Rohilla AC Duronto Express
- Yesvantpur–Chandigarh Karnataka Sampark Kranti Express
- Hatia–Yesvantpur Superfast Express
- Chalukya Express
- Yesvantpur–Vasco da Gama Express
