= Hubballi–Hyderabad Express =

Train in India

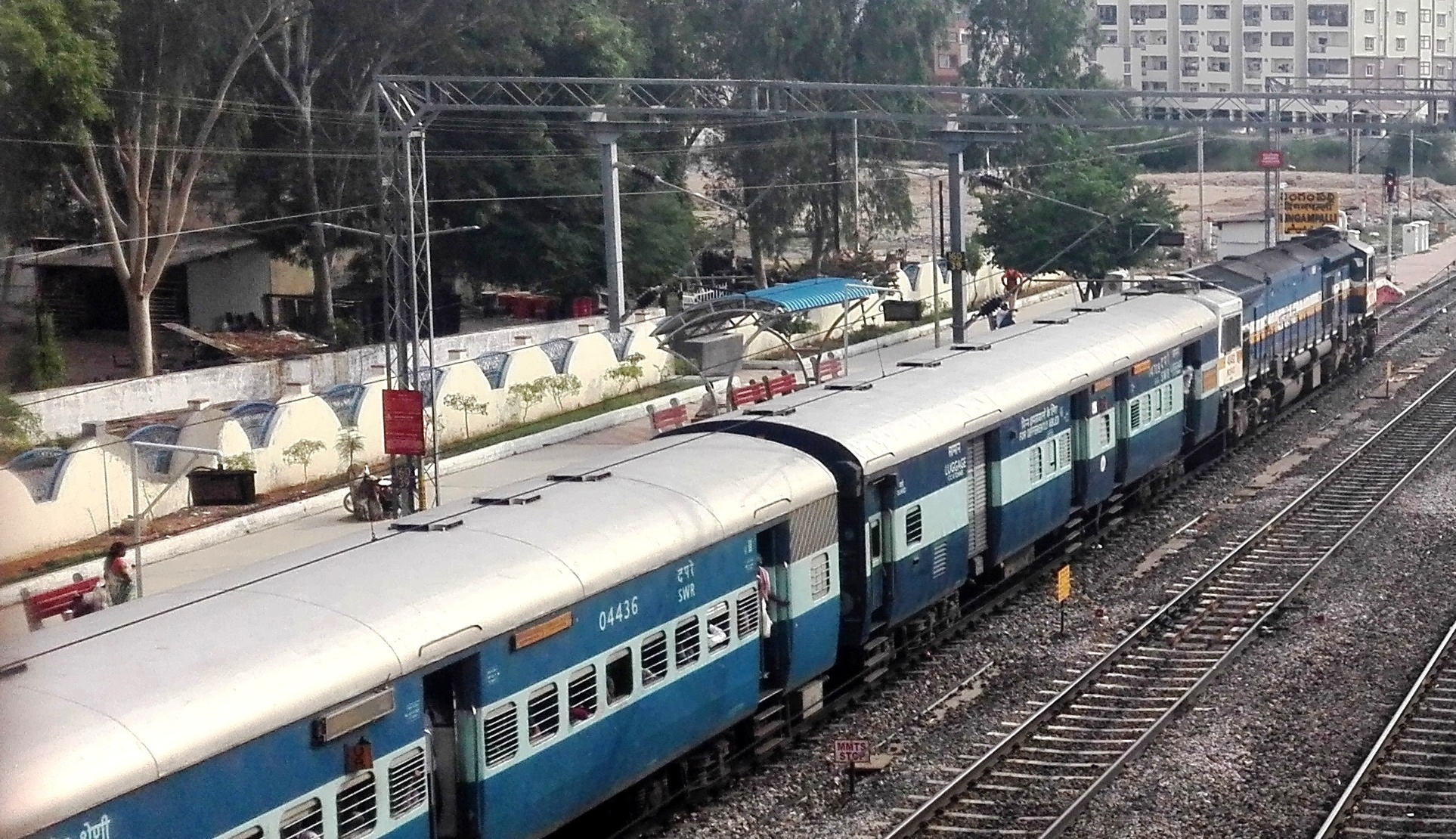
- (Hyderabad–Hubballi) Express at Lingampally

Overview
- Service type: Express
- Current operator: South Central Railway zone

Route
- Termini: Hubballi Junction (UBL); Hyderabad (HYB)
- Stops: 20
- Distance travelled: 664 km (413 mi)
- Average journey time: 14hr(17050); 13hr(17049)
- Service frequency: Daily (Note: Runs seven days in a week for every direction.)
- Train number: 17049/17050

On-board services
- Classes: AC 1st Class, AC 2 tier, AC 3 tier, Sleeper class, General Unreserved
- Seating arrangements: No
- Sleeping arrangements: Yes
- Catering facilities: On-board catering E-catering
- Observation facilities: LHB coach
- Entertainment facilities: No
- Baggage facilities: No
- Other facilities: Below the seats

Technical
- Rolling stock: 4
- Track gauge: 1,676 mm (5 ft 6 in)
- Operating speed: 48 km/h (30 mph), including halts
Route map
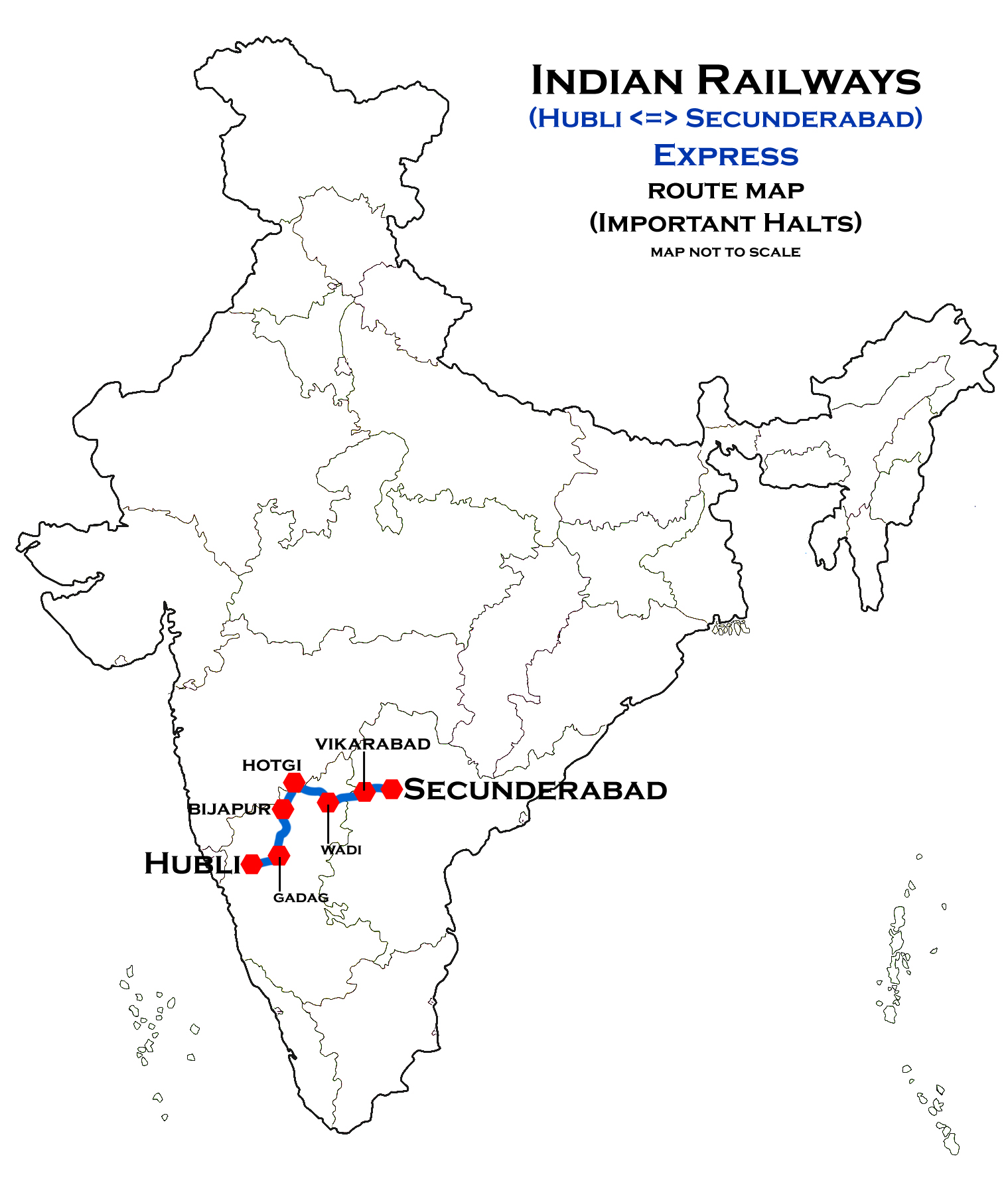

The Hubballi–Hyderabad Express is an Express train belonging to South Central Railway zone that runs between Hubballi Junction and Hyderabad in India. It is currently being operated with 17049/17050 train numbers on a daily basis.

== Service ==
○ The 17049/Hubballi–Hyderabad Express has an average speed of 51 km/h and covers 664 km in 13h.
○ The 17050/Hyderabad–Hubballi Express has an average speed of 47 km/h and covers 664 km in 14h.

== Route and halts ==
The important halts of the train are:

- Hubballi Junction
- Gadag Junction
- Badami
- Bagalkot
- Vijayapura
- Hotgi Junction
- Ganagapur Road
- Gulbarga
- Wadi Junction
- Chittapur
- Sedam
- Tandur
- Vikarabad
- Begumpet
- Secunderabad Junction

== Coach composition ==
The train has standard LHB rakes with a maximum speed of 130 km/h. The train consists of 22 LHB coaches:

- 1 AC 1st Cum II Tier
- 3 AC II Tier
- 6 AC III Tier
- 6 Sleeper coaches
- 4 General Unreserved
- 1 Power Car
- 1 Seating cum Luggage Rake

== Traction ==
Both trains are hauled by a Lallaguda based or Hubballi based WAP-7 electric locomotive from Hubballi to Secunderabad and vice versa wef 26/10/2025

== Rake sharing ==
The train shares its rake with 12759/12760 Charminar Express.

== Direction reversal ==
The train reverses its direction 2 times:

- Gadag Junction
- Hotgi Junction

== See also ==
- Hubli Junction railway station
- Secunderabad Junction railway station
- Hubballi–Lokmanya Tilak Terminus Express
