= Basava Express =

Train in India

Overview
- Service type: Express
- First service: 14 November 2002; 23 years ago
- Current operator: South Western Railway

Route
- Termini: Mysuru (MYS); Bagalkot (BGK)
- Stops: 36
- Distance travelled: 1,018 km (633 mi)
- Average journey time: 21 hours 45 minutes
- Service frequency: Daily. (Note: Runs seven days in a week for every direction.)
- Train number: 17307 / 17308

On-board services
- Classes: AC 2 Tier, AC 3 Tier, Sleeper Class, General Unreserved
- Seating arrangements: Yes
- Sleeping arrangements: Yes
- Catering facilities: On-board catering, E-catering
- Observation facilities: Large windows
- Baggage facilities: No
- Other facilities: Below the seats

Technical
- Rolling stock: LHB coach
- Track gauge: 1,676 mm (5 ft 6 in)
- Operating speed: 47 km/h (29 mph) average including halts.
Route map
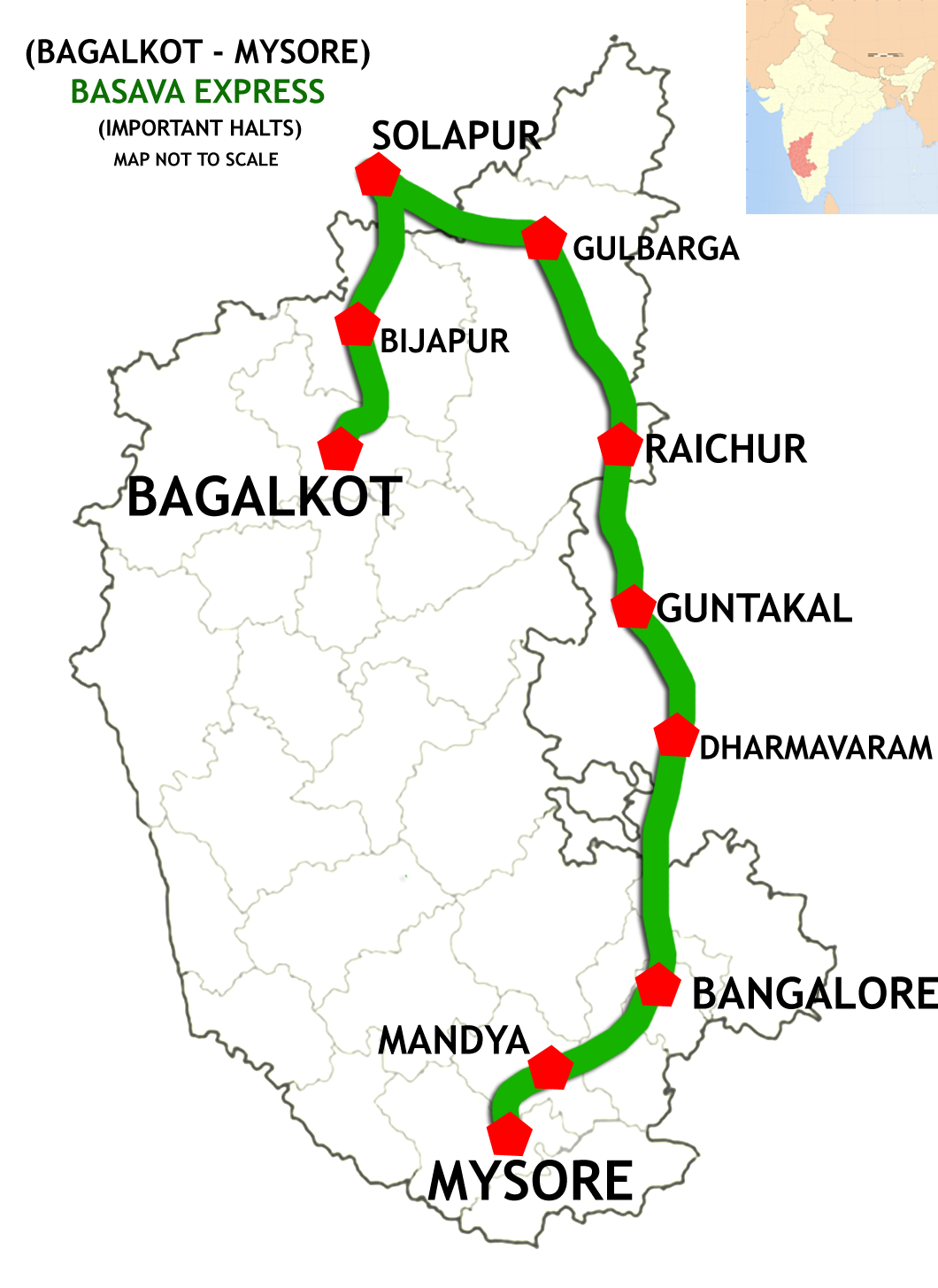

The 17307 / 17308 Basava Express is an express train belonging to South Western Railway zone that runs between Mysuru and Bagalkot in India. It is currently being operated with 17307/17308 train numbers on a daily basis.

== Service ==
The 17307/Basava Express has an average speed of 47 km/h (29 mph) and covers 1,018 km (633 mi) in 21h 45m. The 17308/Basava Express has an average speed of 48 km/h (30 mph) and covers 1,018 km (633 mi) in 21 hours and 15m.

== Schedule ==
Train number	Station code	Departure station	Departure time	Arrival station	Arrival time
17307	MYS	Mysore Junction	1:30 PM	Bagalkot	12:55 PM next day
17308	BGK	Bagalkot	2:10 PM	Mysore Junction	1:30 PM next day

== Route and halts ==
The important halts of the train are:

- Mysore Junction
- Bangalore City
- Yesvantpur Junction
- Yelahanka Junction
- Hindupur
- Dharmavaram Junction
- Anantapur
- Guntakal Junction
- Mantralayam Road
- Raichur Junction
- Yadgir
- Wadi Junction
- Gulbarga
- Ganagapur Road
- Solapur
- Bijapur
- Bagalkot

== Coach composition ==
The train has LHB rakes, the train consists of 21 coaches:

- 2 AC II Tier
- 6 AC III Tier
- 7 Sleeper coaches
- 4 General Unreserved
- 2 Seating cum Luggage Rake (EoG)

== Traction ==
Both trains are hauled by a Krishnarajapuram Loco Shed-based WAP-7 electric locomotive from Mysuru to Bagalkot and vice versa.

== Rake sharing ==
The train shares its rake with 17301/17302 Mysuru-Belagavi Express.

== Direction reversal ==
The train reverses its direction once:

- Solapur

== See also ==
- Mysore Junction railway station
- Bagalkot railway station
- Mysore–Dharwad Express
