= Hubballi–Lokmanya Tilak Terminus Express (via Bijapur) =

Express train in India

Hubballi - Lokmanya Tilak Terminus Express
Overview
- Service type: Express
- First service: 1 November 2014; 11 years ago
- Last service: 5 October 2019
- Current operator: South Western Railway zone

Route
- Termini: Hubballi Junction (UBL); Lokmanya Tilak Terminus (LTT)
- Stops: 32
- Distance travelled: 790 km (491 mi)
- Average journey time: 18h 25m
- Service frequency: Weekly (Note: Runs one day in a week for every direction.)
- Train number: 17321/17322

On-board services
- Classes: AC 2 tier, AC 3 tier, Sleeper Class, General Unreserved
- Seating arrangements: No
- Sleeping arrangements: Yes
- Catering facilities: On-board Catering; E-Catering
- Observation facilities: ICF coach
- Entertainment facilities: No
- Baggage facilities: No
- Other facilities: Below the seats

Technical
- Rolling stock: 2
- Track gauge: 1,676 mm (5 ft 6 in)
- Operating speed: 43 km/h (27 mph), including halts

The Hubballi – Lokmanya Tilak Terminus Express was an Express train belonged to South Western Railway zone that runs between Hubballi Junction and Lokmanya Tilak Terminus in India. It was operated with 17321/17322 train numbers on a weekly basis. The train is stopped on 5 October 2019 since Mumbai CSMT–Gadag Express was extended from Solapur w.e.f. 1 October 2019.

== Service ==
The 17321/Hubballi - Mumbai LTT Weekly Express had an average speed of 43 km/h and covered 790 km in 18h 25m. The 17322/Mumbai LTT - Hubballi Weekly Express had an average speed of 39 km/h and covered 790 km in 18h 25m.

== Route and halts ==
The important halts of the train were:

- Hubballi Junction
- Gadag Junction
- Badami
- Bagalkot
- Almatti
- Bijapur
- Nimbal
- Solapur
- Daund Junction
- Pune Junction
- Lonavala
- Panvel
- Thane
- Lokmanya Tilak Terminus

== Coach composite ==
The train had standard ICF rakes with a maximum speed of 110 km/h. The train consisted of 16 coaches :

- 1 AC II Tier
- 1 AC III Tier
- 6 Sleeper Coaches
- 6 General Unreserved
- 2 Seating cum Luggage Rake

== Traction ==
train is hauled by either a WAP-7 electric locomotive from Hubballi or bhusaval based WAP-4 from ubl to Kurla and vice versa.

== Rake sharing ==
The train shared its rake with 12777/12778 Hubballi - Kochuveli Superfast Express.

== Direction reversal ==
Train Reversed its direction 1 times:

- Gadag Junction

== See also ==
- Hubballi Junction railway station
- Lokmanya Tilak Terminus
- Hubballi – Lokmanya Tilak Terminus Express
- Hubballi - Kochuveli Superfast Express
