= Gol Gumbaz Express =

Train in India

Overview
- Service type: Express
- Locale: Karnataka & Maharashtra
- First service: 1 April 1971; 55 years ago
- Current operator: South Western Railway

Route
- Termini: Mysore (MYS); Pandharpur (PVR)
- Stops: 30
- Distance travelled: 1,098 km (682 mi)
- Average journey time: 20 hrs 55 mins
- Service frequency: Daily
- Train number: 16535 / 16536

On-board services
- Classes: AC First Class, AC 2 Tier, AC 3 Tier, Sleeper Class, General Unreserved
- Seating arrangements: Yes
- Sleeping arrangements: Yes
- Catering facilities: E-catering, On-board catering
- Observation facilities: Large Windows
- Baggage facilities: Available

Technical
- Rolling stock: LHB coach
- Track gauge: 1,676 mm (5 ft 6 in); Broad Gauge
- Operating speed: 52 km/h (32 mph) average including halts.
- Rake sharing: Rake sharing with 16591/16592 Hampi Express

The 16535 / 16536 Gol Gumbaz Express is an express train running between Mysuru and Pandharpur. It is belongs to Indian Railways of South Western Railway zone.

== Relevance ==
The train is named after the famous Gol Gumbaz, a historical monument located in Vijayapura. It is an important train that connects North Karnataka with Bangalore. This train covers important districts of Karnataka which include Mysuru, Bangalore, Tumkur from south Karnataka, and Haveri, Dharwad, Gadag, Bagalkot, Vijayapura from North Karnataka. Initially ran upto Solapur now upto extended Pandharpur.

== Route and halts ==
The train runs from Mysore via Kengeri, KSR Bengaluru, Yesvantpur Junction, Arsikere Junction, Davangere, Hubballi South, Gadag Bypass, Bagalkot, Bijapur, Hotgi Junction, Solapur Junction to Pandharpur.

== Schedule ==
- 16536 Gol Gumbaz Express leaves Pandharpur at 13:00 IST, arrive at 06:50 IST arrives in Mysuru jn at 10:45 IST at with an average speed of 52 km/h
- 16535 Gol Gumbaz Express leaves Mysuru jn at 15:30 IST, arrives in Pandharpur 12:25 IST with an average speed of 52km/h.

== Traction ==
earlier it was used to run with WDP-4 diesel locomotive. Now it is hauled by a Hubli Loco Shed-based WAP-7 electric locomotive from Pandharpur to Mysuru and vice-versa.

== Rake sharing ==
This train shares its rake with 16591/16592 Hampi Express.

== Gallery ==
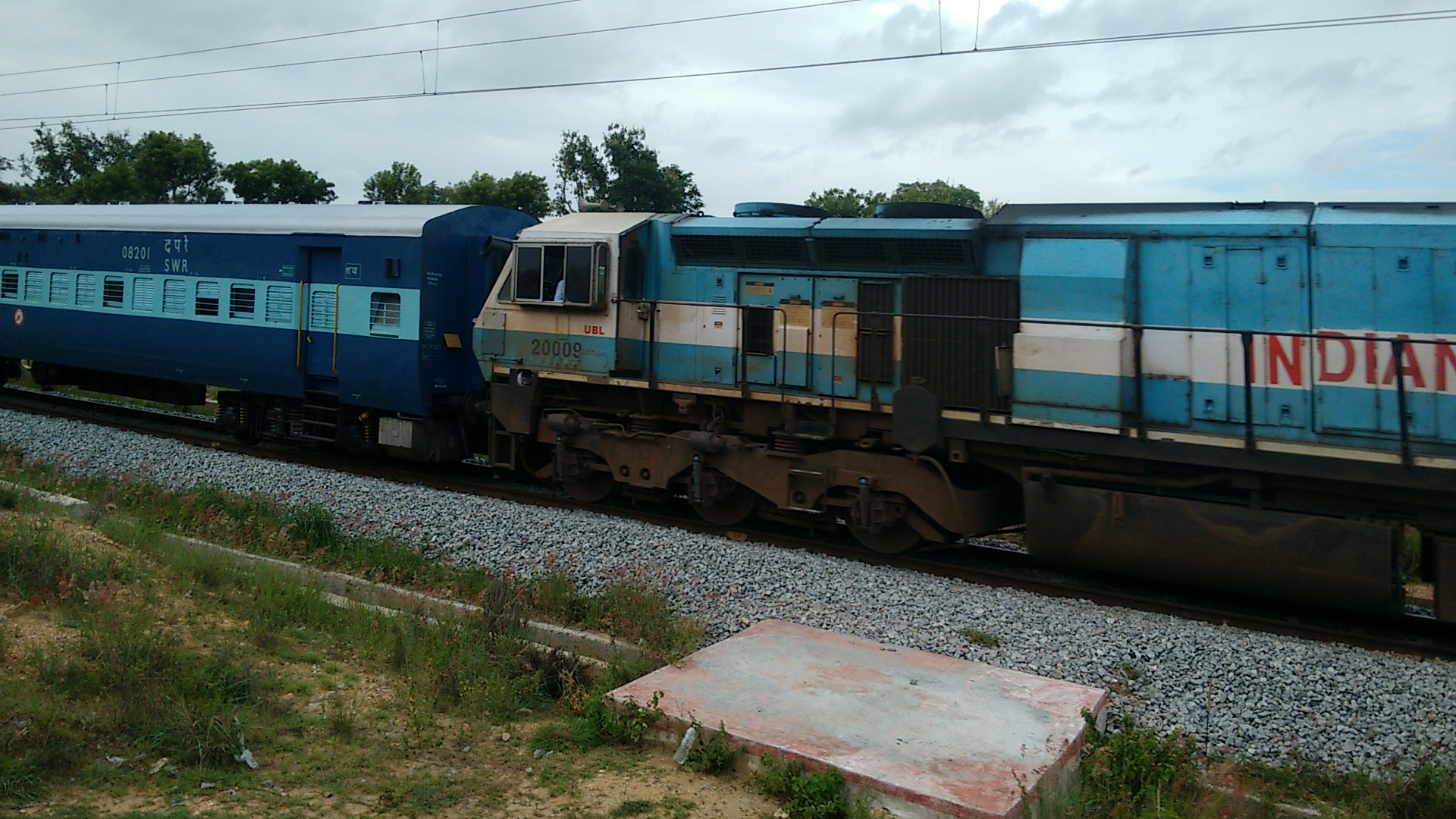
Gol Gumbaz Express near Yeliyur

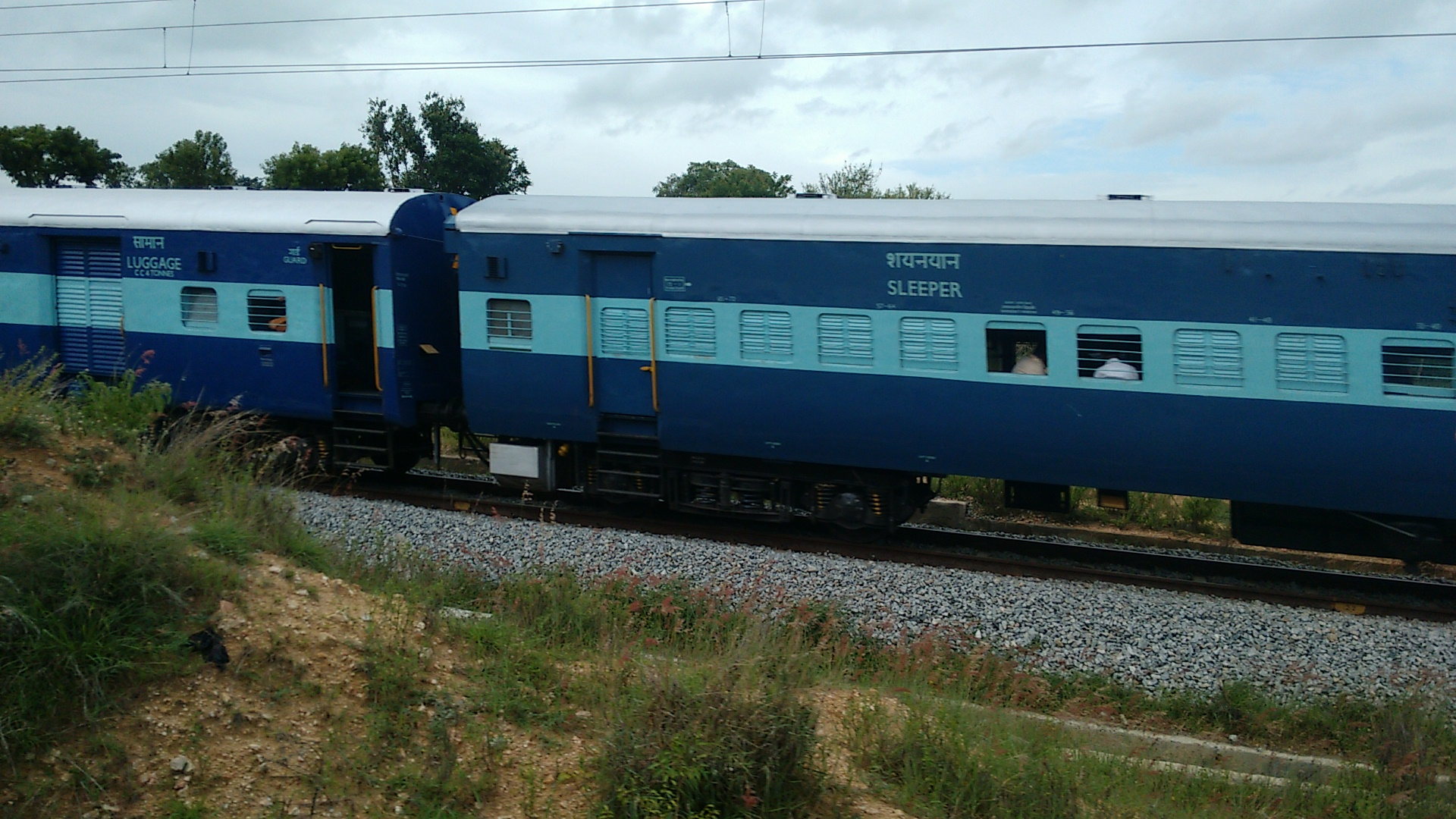
Gol Gumbaz Express negotiating curve near Yeliyur

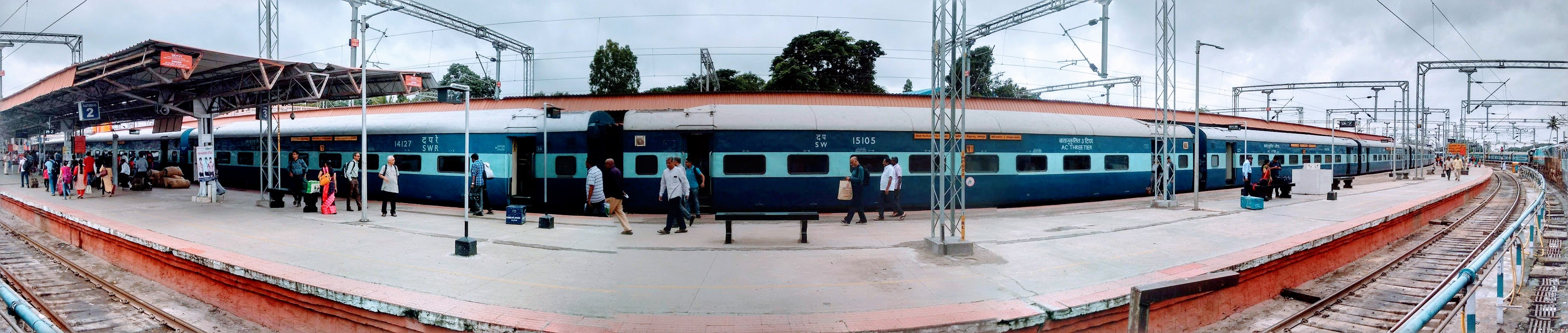
Panorama view of Hampi & Gol Gumbaz Express rake parked at Mysore junction

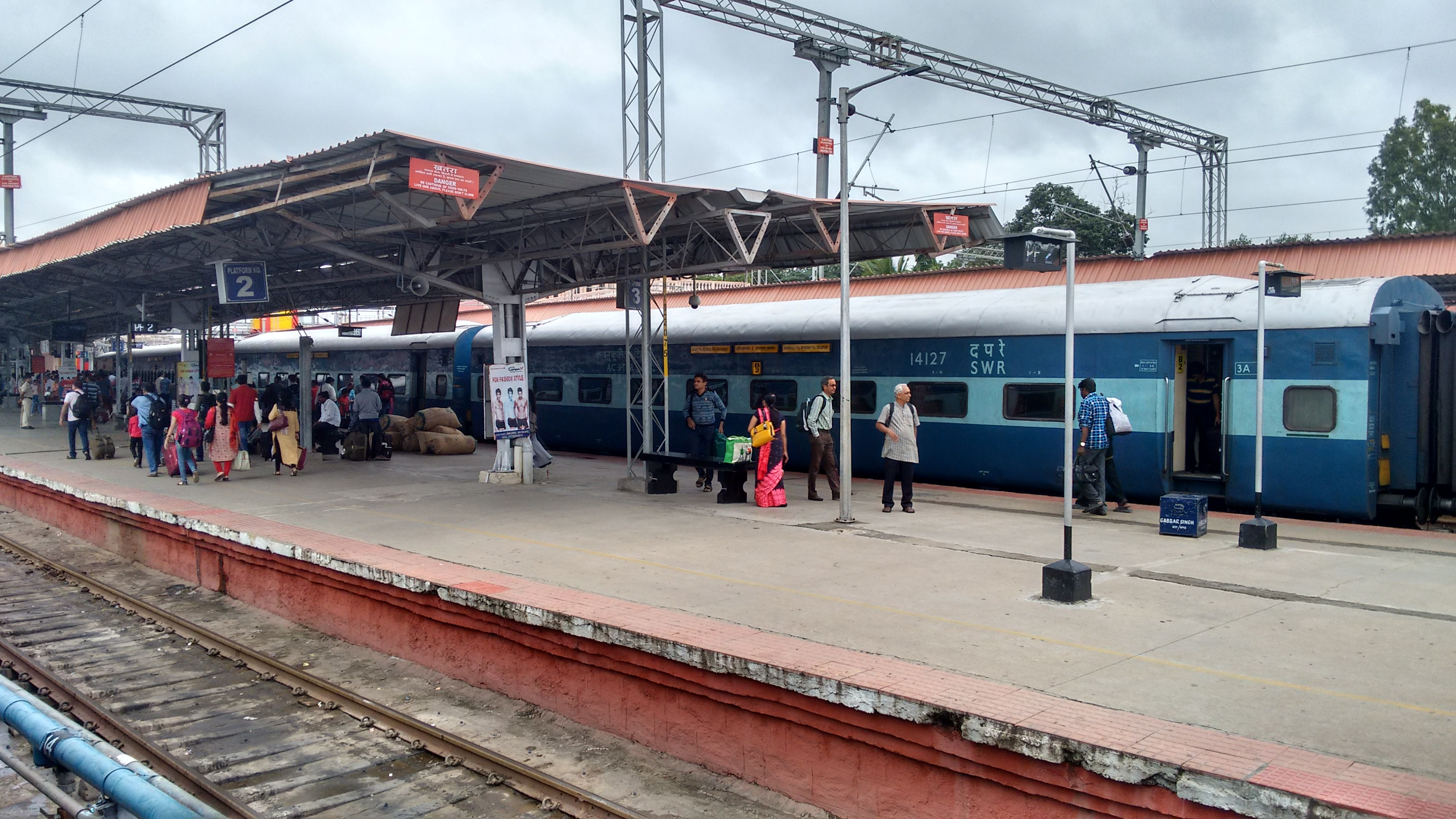

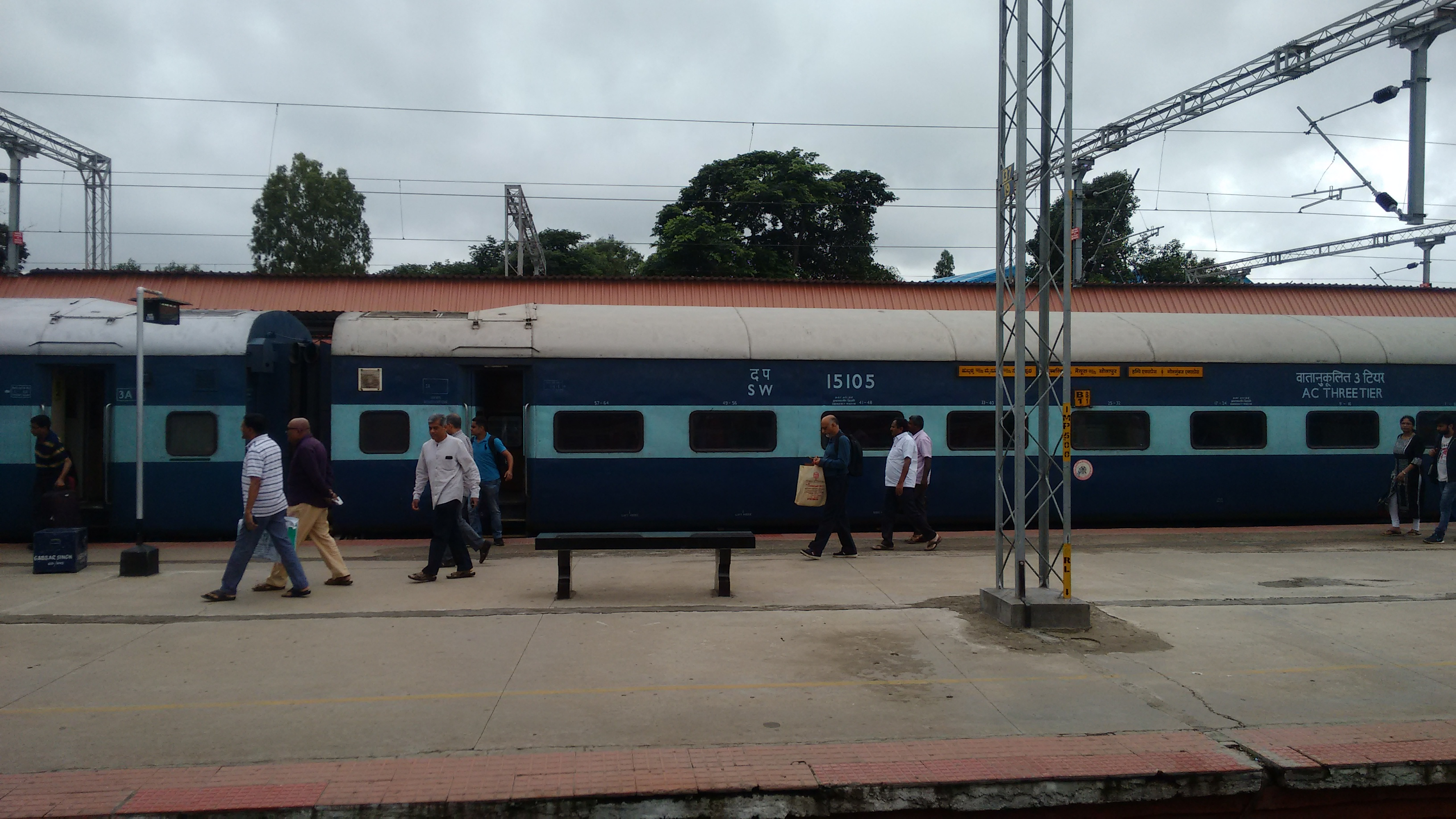

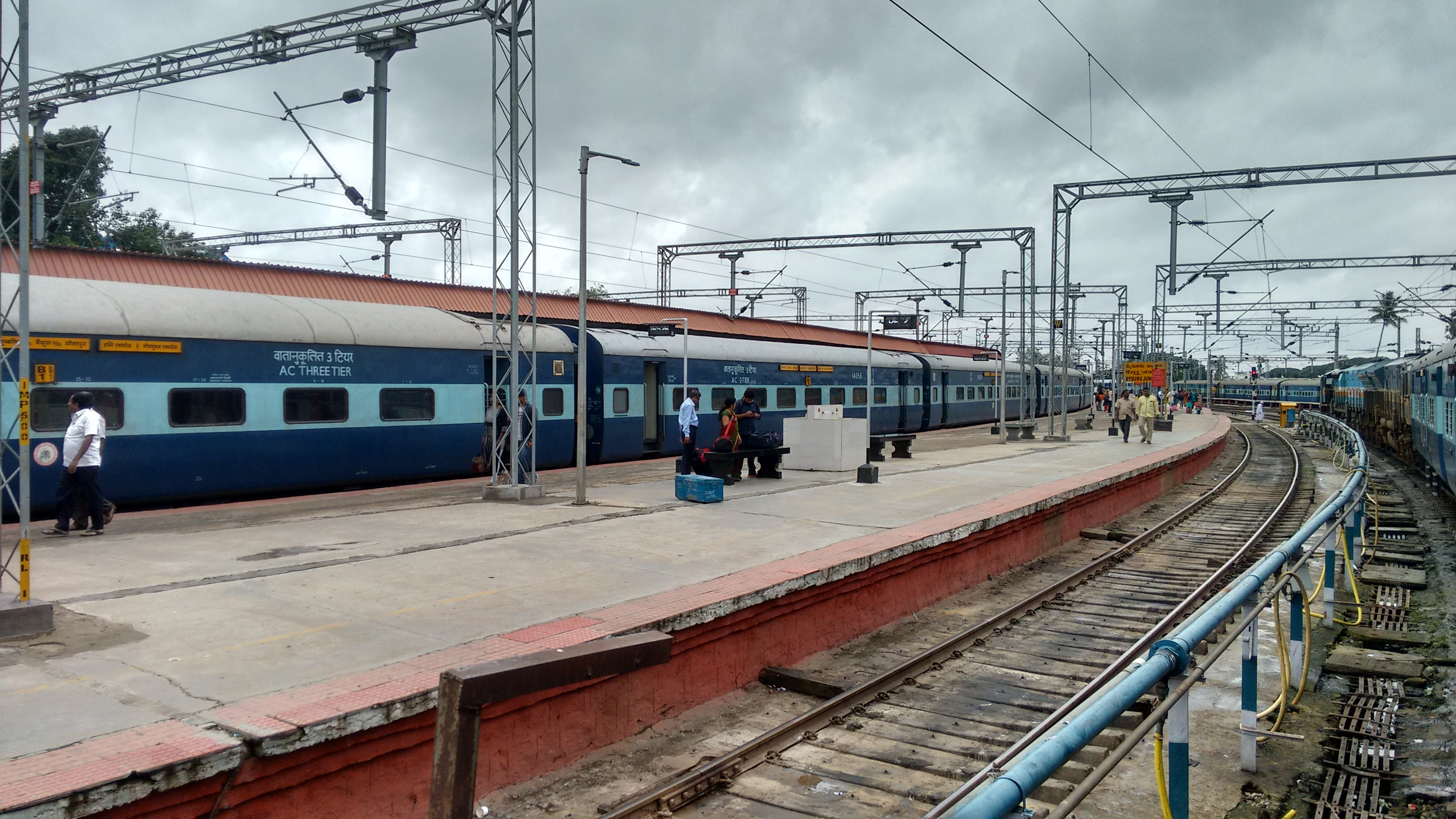

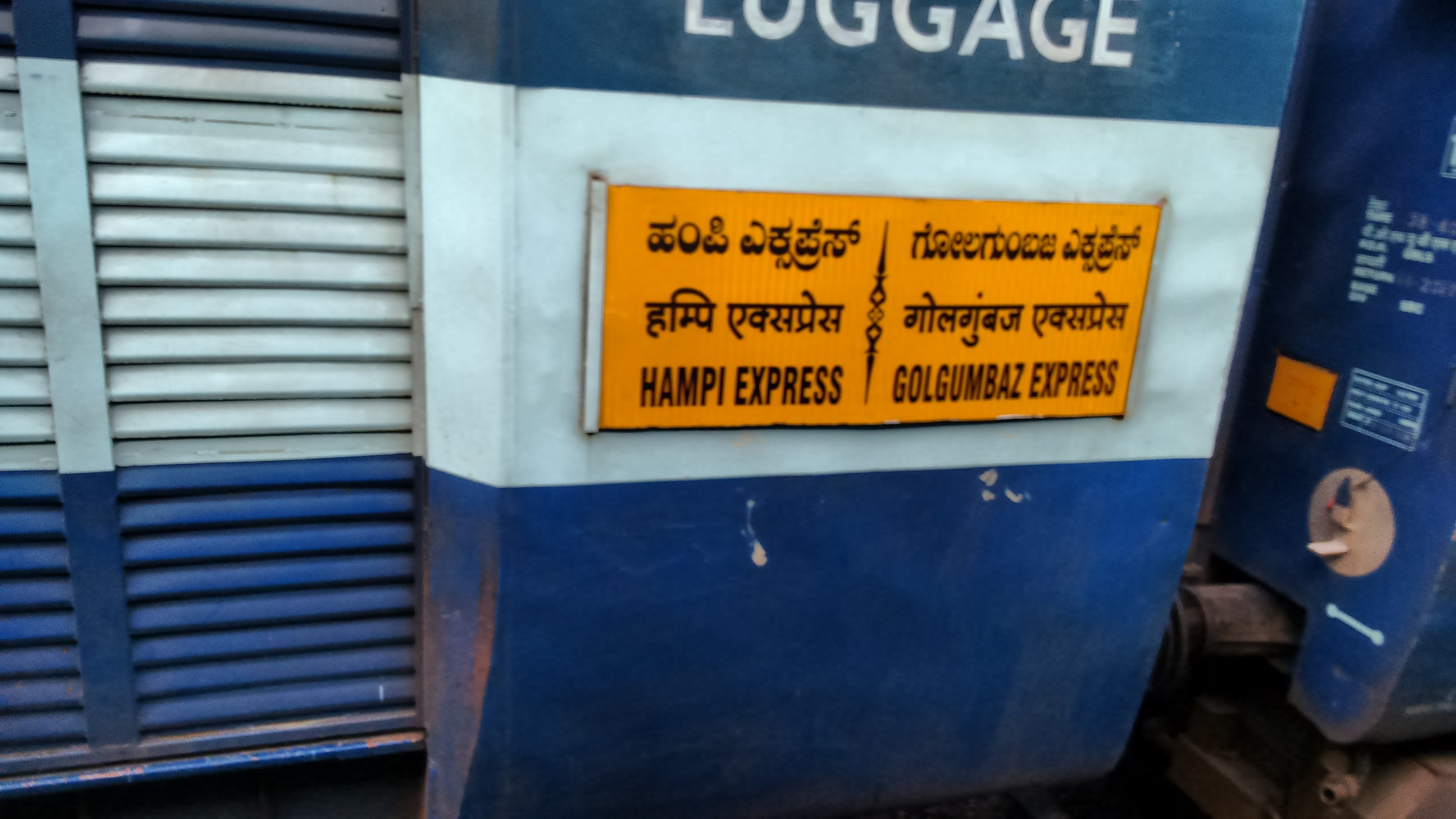

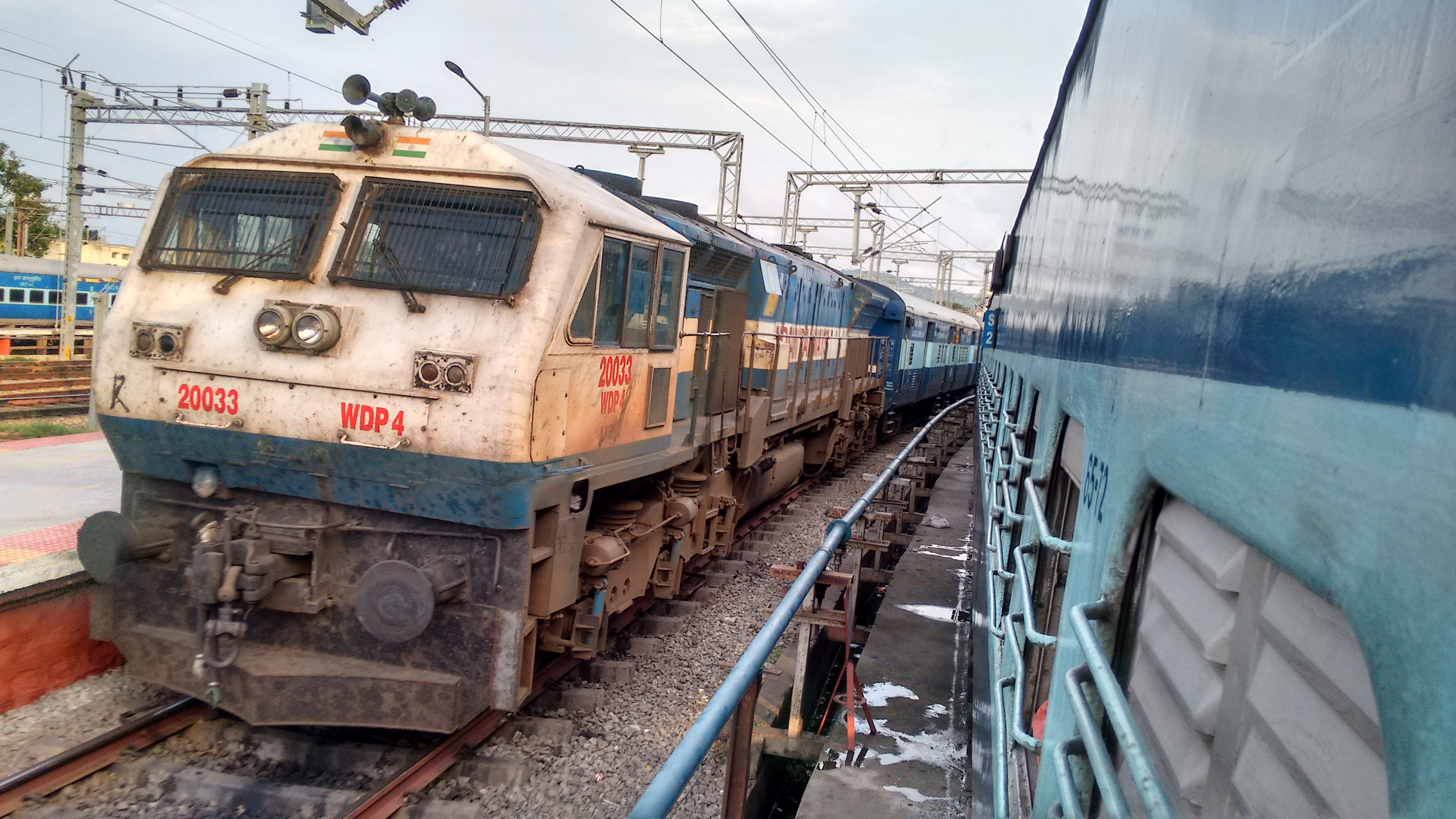

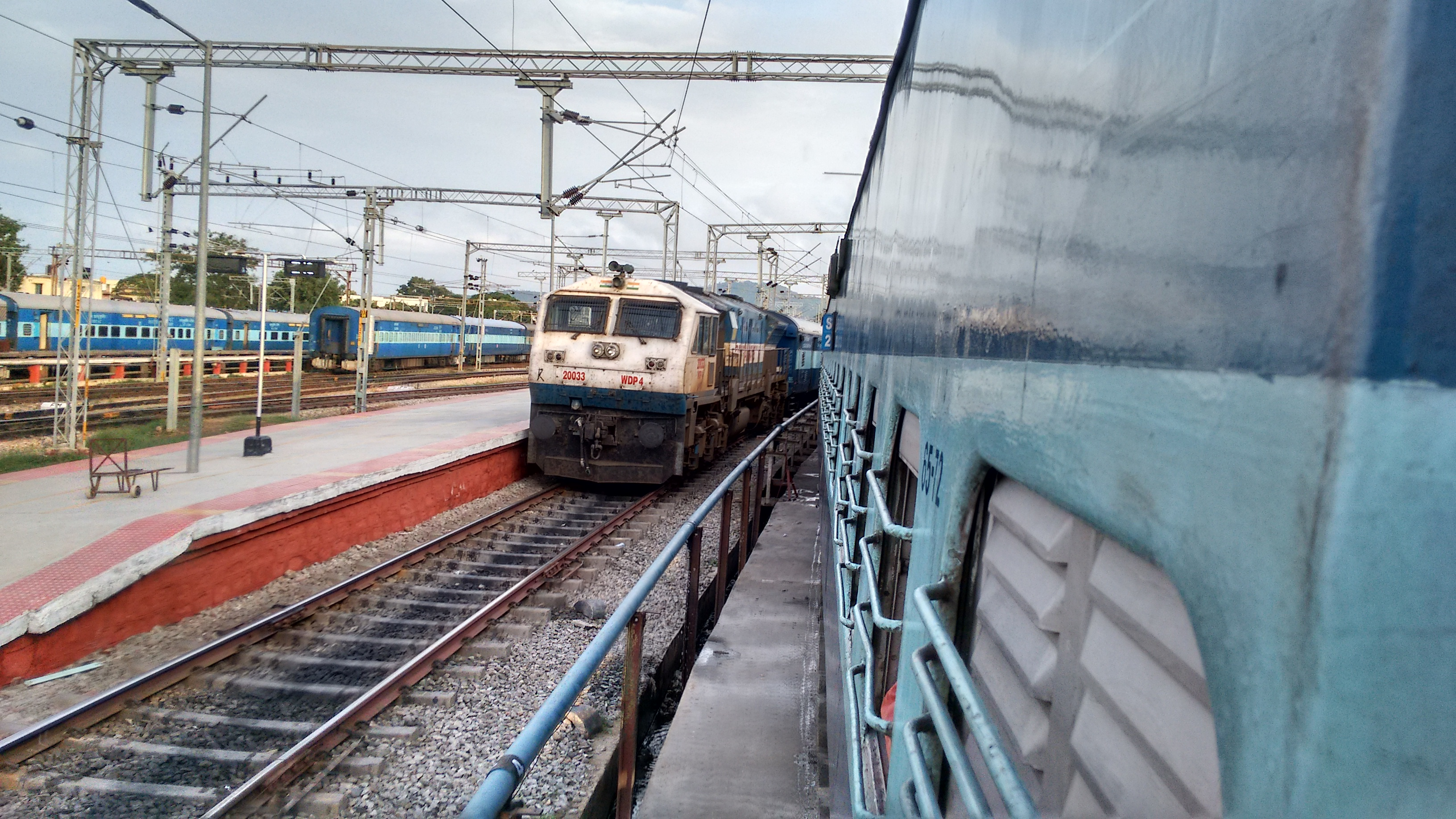

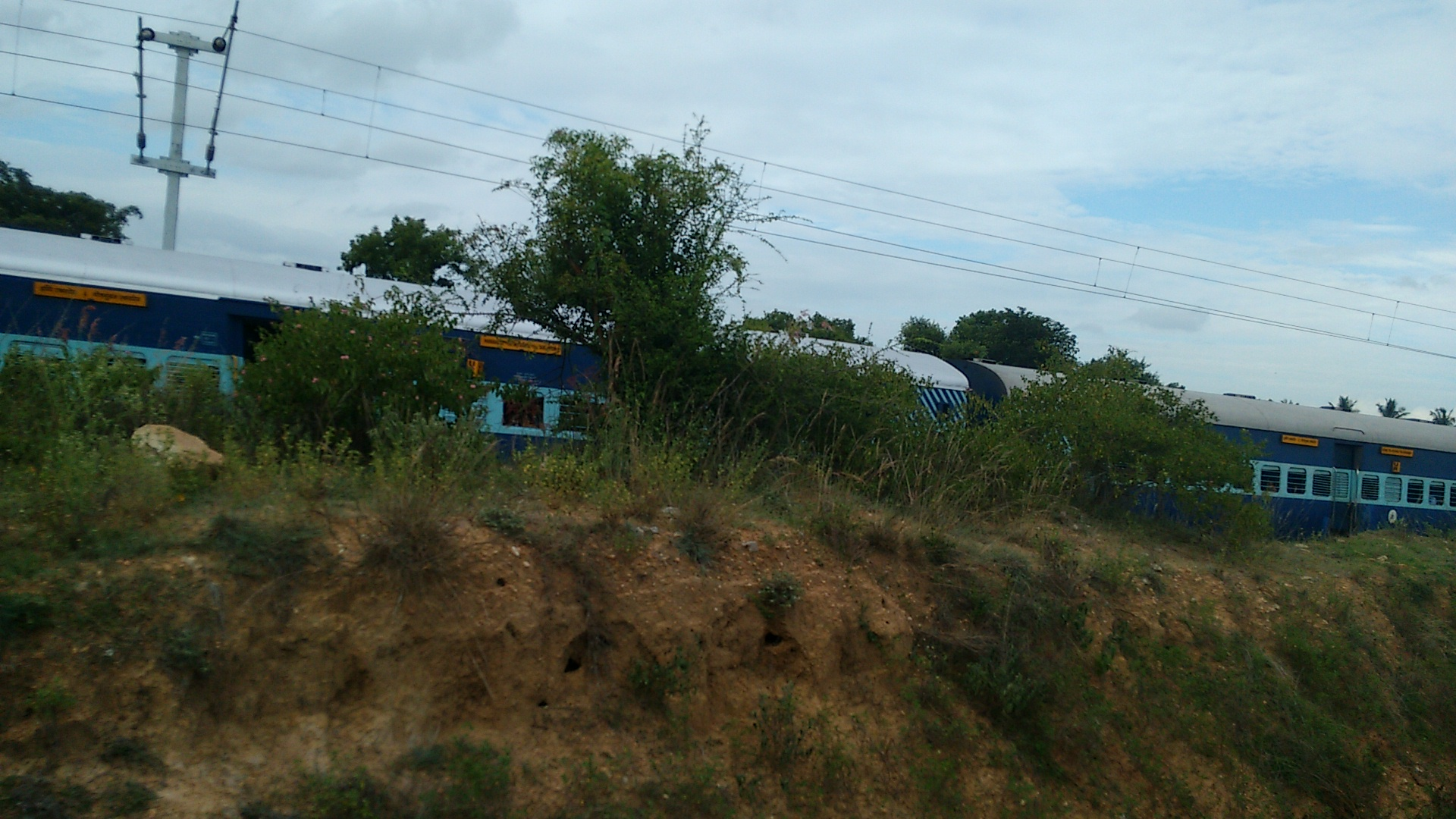
