= Badami railway station =

Railway station in Karnataka, India

Badami
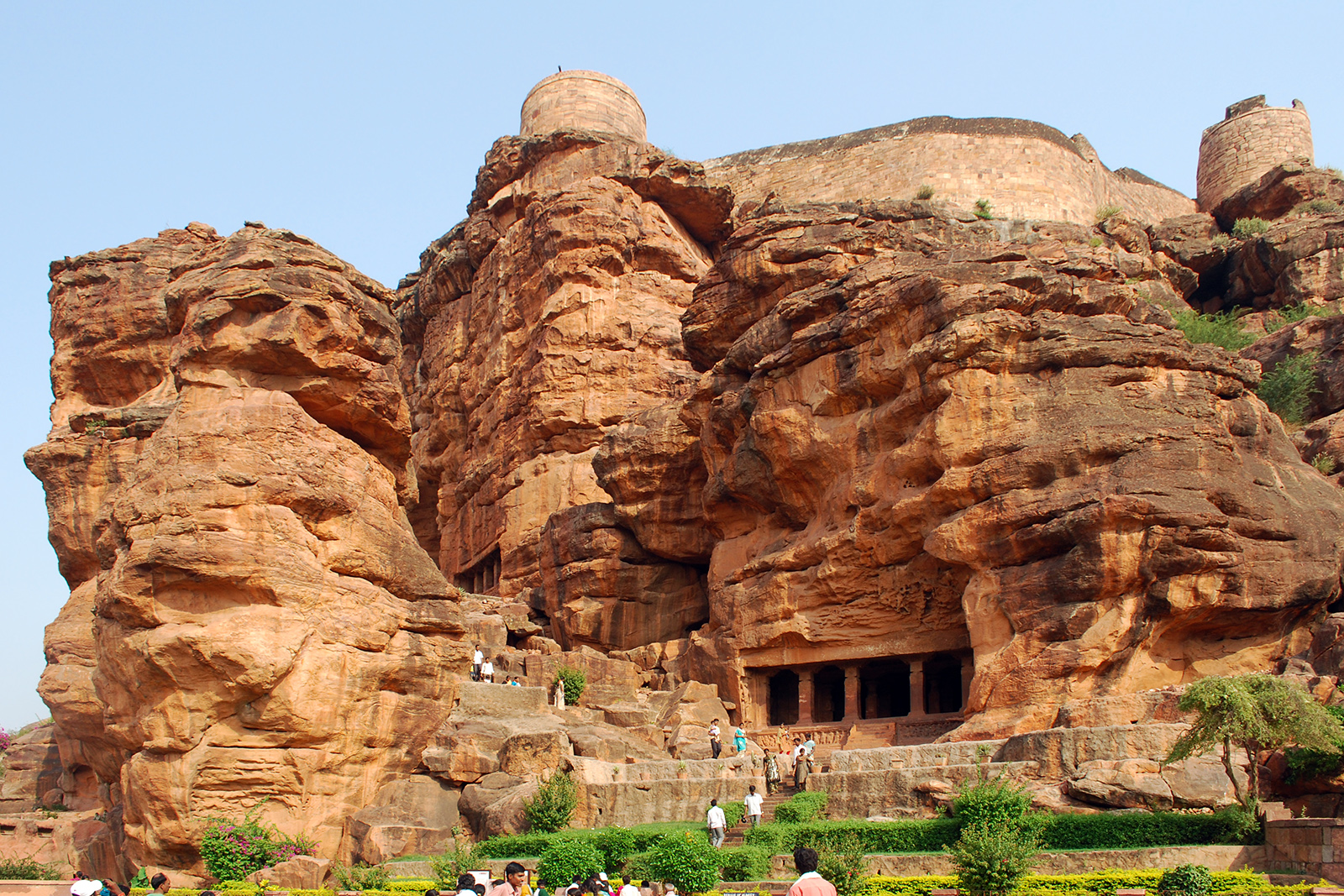

General information
- Location: Kerur Road Adagal 587201, Bagalkot district, Karnataka; India
- Coordinates: 15°57′33″N 75°40′29″E
- Elevation: 586 metres (1,923 ft)
- System: Indian Railways station
- Owner: Indian Railways
- Operator: South Western Railway
- Line: Gadag–Hotgi line
- Platforms: 2
- Tracks: 3

Construction
- Structure type: Standard (on-ground station)
- Parking: No
- Cycle facilities: No

Other information
- Status: Functioning
- Station code: BDM
- Zone(s): South Western Railway
- Division(s): Hubli
Location
- Location within Karnataka

Badami railway station (station code: BDM) falls under Hubli railway division of South Western Railway in Bagalkot district, Karnataka, India. Badami railway station has two platforms which serve mainly Badami Town and nearby heritage tourist places like Badami Caves, Pattadkal and Aihole.

== Developments ==
Reconnaissance engineering -cum- traffic survey for new line between Badami–Yelburga via Gajendragarh (53 km) This new survey was sanctioned by Railway Board during December 2016 and detailed estimate for conducting reconnaissance engineering -cum- traffic survey was vetted by FA&CAO/CN/BNC on 17.01.2017 and sanctioned by CAO/CN/BNC. Tender to be opened on 30.05.2017

== Major trains ==
Trains those run through/from Badami are:

- Gol Gumbaz Express
- Hubballi–Secunderabad Express
- Hubballi–Varanasi Weekly Express
- Hubballi–Lokmanya Tilak Terminus Express (via Bijapur)
- Yesvantpur–Barmer AC Express
- Solapur–Hubballi Intercity Express
- Solapur–Gadag DEMU Passenger
- Solapur–Dharwad Passenger
- Bijapur–Hubli Passenger
