= Yesvantpur–Bikaner Express =

Train in India

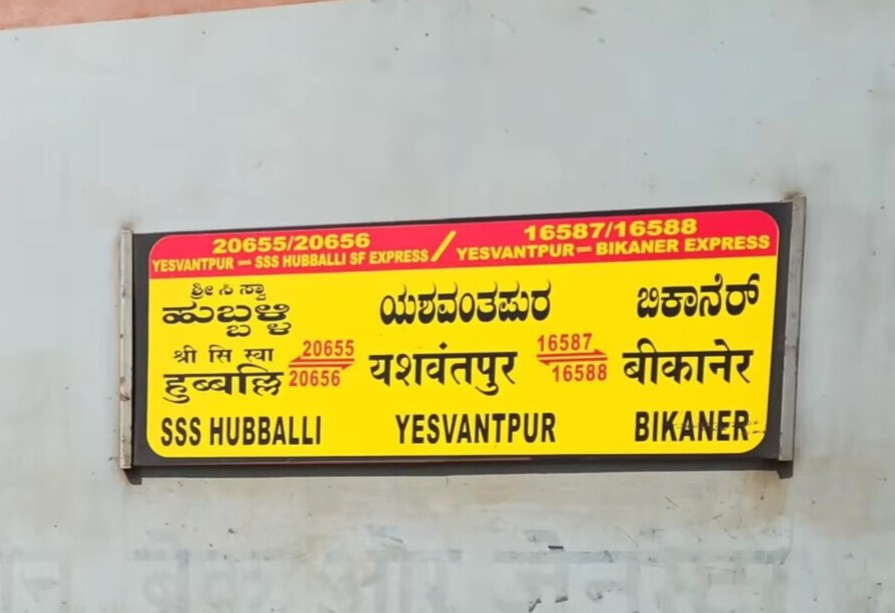

Overview
- Service type: Express
- First service: 12 December 2014; 11 years ago
- Current operator: South Western Railway

Route
- Termini: Yesvantpur (YPR); Bikaner (BKN)
- Stops: 34
- Distance travelled: 2,445 km (1,519 mi)
- Average journey time: 50 hours 20 mins
- Service frequency: Bi-Weekly
- Train number: 16587 / 16588

On-board services
- Classes: AC 2 tier, AC 3 tier, Sleeper class, General Unreserved
- Seating arrangements: Yes
- Sleeping arrangements: Yes
- Catering facilities: On-board catering, E-catering
- Observation facilities: Large windows
- Baggage facilities: No
- Other facilities: Below the seats

Technical
- Rolling stock: LHB coach
- Track gauge: 1,676 mm (5 ft 6 in)
- Operating speed: 49 km/h (30 mph) average including halts.

The 16587 / 16588 Yesvantpur–Bikaner Express is an Express train belonging to Indian Railways South Western Railway zone that runs between Yesvantpur Junction and Bikaner Junction in India.

It operates as train number 16587 from Yesvantpur Junction to Bikaner Junction and as train number 16588 in the reverse direction, serving the states of Rajasthan, Gujarat, Maharashtra and Karnataka.

== Coaches ==
The 16587 / 88 Yesvantpur Junction–Bikaner Junction Express has one AC-1 Tier, one AC 2-tier, three AC 3-tier, seven sleeper class, six general unreserved and two SLR (seating with luggage rake) coaches . It doesn't carry a pantry car.

As is customary with most train services in India, coach composition may be amended at the discretion of Indian Railways depending on demand.

== Service ==
The 16587 Yesvantpur Junction–Bikaner Junction Express covers the distance of 2,442 km (1,517 mi) in 50 hours 10 mins (49 km/h) and in 53 hours 05 mins as the 16588 Bikaner Junction–Yesvantpur Junction Express (46 km/h).

As the average speed of the train is lower than 55 km/h (34 mph), as per railway rules, its fare doesn't includes a Superfast surcharge.

== Routing ==
The 16587 / 88 Yesvantpur Junction–Bikaner Junction Express runs from Yesvantpur Junction via Arsikere Junction, Hubli Junction, Davangere, Gadag Junction, Bijapur, Solapur, Pune Junction, Kalyan Junction, Vasai Road, Surat, Vadodara Junction, Ahmedabad Junction, Marwar Junction, Luni Junction, Jodhpur Junction, Nagaur to Bikaner Junction.

== Traction ==
The train(s) is/are hauled by Diesel & Electric Loco Shed, Krishnarajapuram or SSS Hubballi based WDP-4D from Yesvantpur to Hubballi junction and a WAP-7 from SSS Hubballi till bikaner and vice versa

== Direction reversal ==
The train reverses its direction twice, at:

- Hubli Junction
- Gadag Junction.
