= Solapur–Hubballi Intercity Express =

Intercity train

Solapur - Hubballi Intercity Express
Overview
- Service type: Express
- Current operator: Central Railway zone

Route
- Termini: Solapur (SUR); Hubli Junction (UBL)
- Stops: 12
- Distance travelled: 359 km (223 mi)
- Average journey time: 8 hours 05 minutes
- Service frequency: Daily (Note: Runs seven days in a week for every direction.)
- Train number: 11423/11424

On-board services
- Classes: AC 2 tier, AC 3 tier, Sleeper Class, General Unreserved
- Seating arrangements: No
- Sleeping arrangements: Yes
- Catering facilities: No
- Entertainment facilities: No
- Baggage facilities: Below the seats

Technical
- Rolling stock: 2
- Track gauge: 1,676 mm (5 ft 6 in)
- Operating speed: 44 km/h (27 mph)
Route map
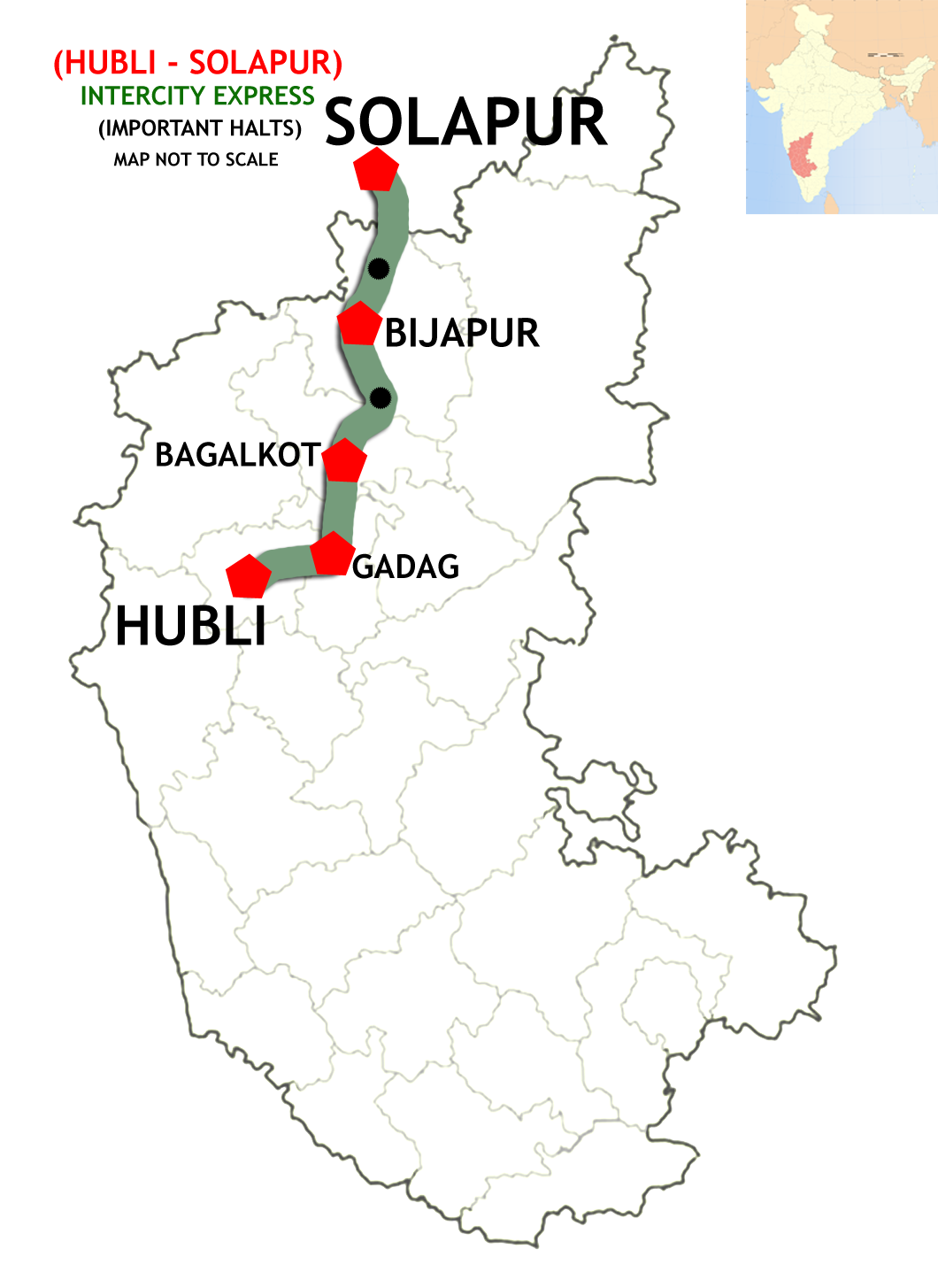

Solapur - Hubballi Intercity Express is an intercity train of the Indian Railways connecting Solapur in Maharashtra and Hubballi of Karnataka. It is currently being operated with 11423/11424 train numbers on a daily basis.

== Service ==
The 11423/Solapur - Hubballi Intercity Express has an average speed of 44 km/h and covers 359 km in 8 hrs 5 mins. 11424/Hubballi - Solapur Intercity Express has an average speed of 43 km/h and 359 km in 8 hrs 15 mins.

== Schedule ==
Train runs Daily from both the stations. Only dedicated to this route

Train Number	Station Code	Departure Station	Departure Time	Departure Day	Arrival Station	Arrival Time	Arrival Day
11423	SUR	Solapur	6:25 AM	Daily	Hubli	2:25 PM	Same Day
11424	UBL	Hubli	3:00 PM	Daily	Solapur	11:15 PM	Same Day

== Route and halts ==
The important halts of the train are:

- Solapur
- Hotgi Junction
- Bijapur
- Bagalkot
- Gadag Junction
- Hubli Junction

== Coach composite ==
The train has standard ICF rakes with max speed of 110 kmph. The train consists of 22 coaches :

- 1 Chair car
- 6 General
- 2 Second-class Luggage/parcel van

== Traction ==
Both trains are hauled by a Hubballi Loco Shed based WAG-9 electric locomotive from Solapur to Hubballi and vice versa.

== Direction reversal ==
Train reverses its direction 1 times:

- Gadag Junction
