= Hubballi–Thiruvananthapuram North Superfast Express =

Train in India

Hubballi–Kochuveli Superfast Express

Overview
- Service type: Express
- Locale: Karnataka, Kerala
- First service: 3 December 2009; 16 years ago
- Current operator: South Western Railway zone

Route
- Termini: Hubballi Junction (UBL); Thiruvananthapuram North (TVCN)
- Stops: 20
- Distance travelled: 1,294 km (804 mi)
- Average journey time: 23h 45m
- Service frequency: Weekly (Note: Runs one day in a week for every direction.)
- Train number: 12777/12778

On-board services
- Classes: AC 2 tier, AC 3 tier, AC 3 tier Economy, Sleeper class, General Unreserved
- Seating arrangements: No
- Sleeping arrangements: Yes
- Catering facilities: On-board catering E-catering
- Observation facilities: LHB coach
- Entertainment facilities: No
- Baggage facilities: No
- Other facilities: Below the seats

Technical
- Rolling stock: 2
- Track gauge: 1,676 mm (5 ft 6 in)
- Operating speed: 54 km/h (34 mph), including halts
Route map
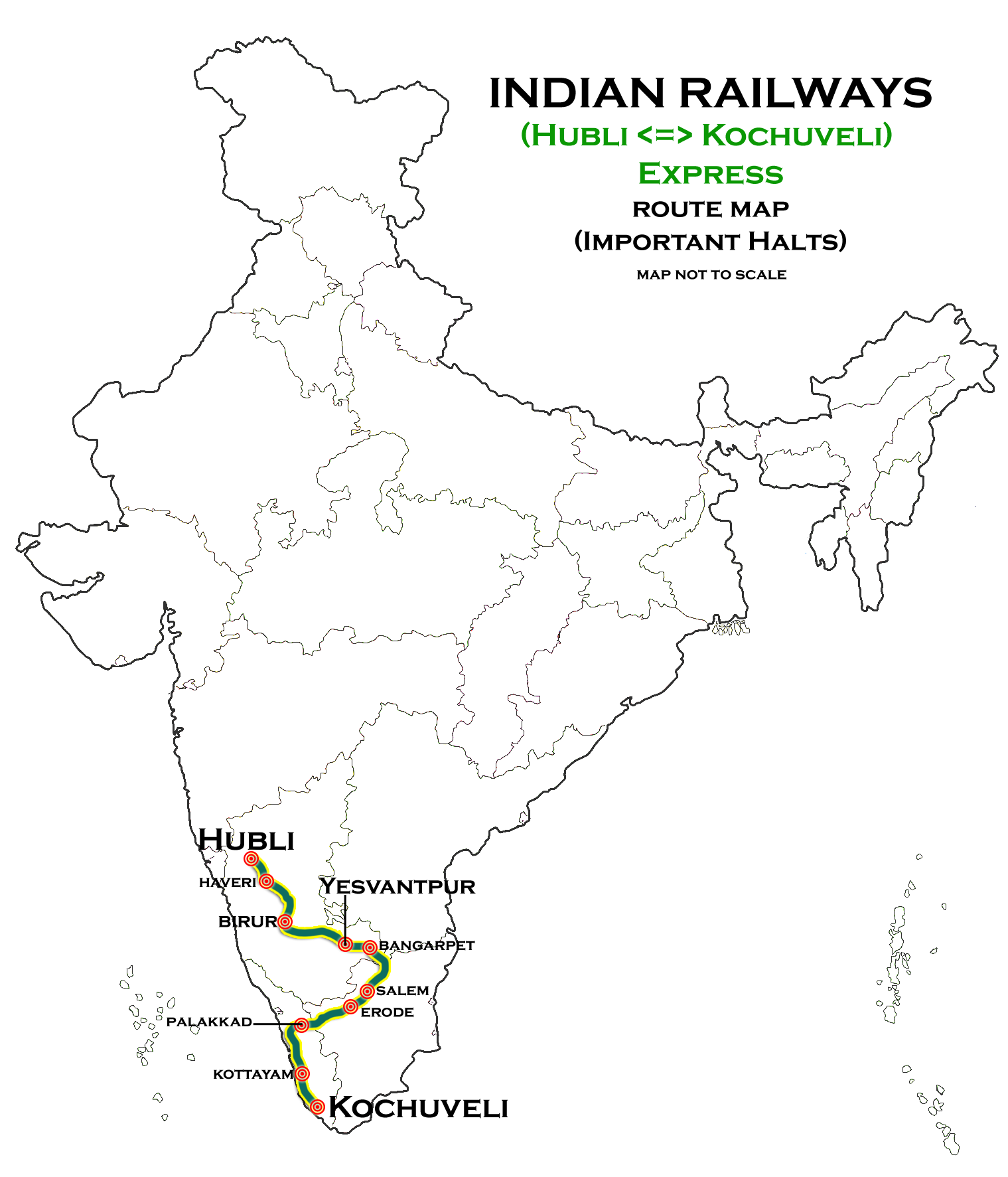

The 12777 / 12778 Hubballi–Thiruvananthapuram North Superfast Express is an Express train belonging to South Western Railway zone that runs between Hubballi Junction and Thiruvananthapuram North.It began operations as Kochuveli–Yeswanthpur weekly express and was later extended to Hubballi. It is currently being operated on a weekly basis.

== Service ==
The 12777/Hubballi–Thiruvananthapuram North Weekly Superfast Express has an average speed of 54 km/h and covers 1294 km in 23h 45m. The 12778/Thiruvananthapuram North–Hubballi Weekly Superfast Express has an average speed of 54 km/h and covers 1294 km in 23h 45m.

== Schedule ==
12777 - SSS Hubballi Junction → Kochuveli
Station Name	Station Code	Arrival	Departure	Day
SSS Hubballi Junction	UBL	-	06:55	1
Arsikere Junction	ASK	11:35	11:40	1
Chikka Banavara Junction	BAW	13:38	13:40	1
Banaswadi	BAND	15:43	15:45	1
Krishnarajapuram	KJM	16:03	16:05	1
Bangarapet Junction	BWT	16:47	16:48	1
Salem Junction	SA	19:47	19:50	1
Erode Junction	ED	20:47	20:50	1
Palakkad Junction	PGT	23:17	23:20	1
Ernakulam Town	ERN	01:45	01:50	2
Tiruvalla	TRVL	03:24	03:25	2
Kollam Junction	QLN	04:57	05:00	2
Thiruvananthapuram North	TVCN	06:35	-	
12778 - Kochuveli → SSS Hubballi Junction
Thiruvananthapuram North	TVCN	-	12:50	1
Kollam Junction	QLN	13:40	13:43	1
Tiruvalla	TRVL	14:47	14:48	1
Ernakulam Town	ERN	16:55	17:00	1
Palakkad Junction	PGT	19:32	19:35	1
Erode Junction	ED	22:20	22:25	1
Salem Junction	SA	23:22	23:25	
Bangarapet Junction	BWT	02:34	02:35	2
Banaswadi	BAND	03:43	03:45	2
Chikka Banavara Junction	BAW	04:23	04:24	2
Arsikere Junction	ASK	06:40	06:45	2
SSS Hubballi Junction	UBL	12:30	-	2

== Route and halts ==
The important halts of the train are:

- Hubballi Junction
- Harihar
- Davangere
- Arsikere Junction
- Salem Junction
- Erode Junction
- Palakkad Junction
- Thrissur
- Ernakulam Town
- Kottayam
- Kollam Junction
- Thiruvananthapuram North

== Coach composition ==
The train has standard LHB rakes with a maximum speed of 130 km/h. The train consists of 21 coaches:

- 2 AC II Tier
- 3 AC III Tier
- 3 AC III Tier Economy
- 7 Sleeper coaches
- 4 General Unreserved
- 1 Seating cum Luggage Rake
- 1 End on Generator Car

== Traction ==
earlier was Arakkonam-based WAP-4, The train is hauled by a Hubballi WAP-7 electric locomotive in both directions.

== See also ==
- Hubli Junction railway station
- Thiruvananthapuram North railway station
- Hubballi–Lokmanya Tilak Terminus Express (via Bijapur)
