= Bagalkot railway station =

Railway station in Karnataka, India

Bagalkot Junction

General information
- Location: State Highway 20, Bagalkote; India
- Coordinates: 16°11′N 75°42′E
- Elevation: 541 metres (1,775 ft)
- System: Indian Railways station
- Owner: Indian Railways
- Operator: South Western Railway zone
- Line: Bagalkote–Kudachi branch line Gadag-Hotgi line
- Platforms: 3
- Tracks: 5

Construction
- Structure type: Standard on ground
- Parking: Yes
- Cycle facilities: No

Other information
- Status: Functioning
- Station code: BGK
- Division(s): Hubli

History
- Opened: 1884; 142 years ago
Location
- Location within Karnataka

Bagalkot Junction railway station (station code: BGK) is a railway station in the Hubli railway division of South Western Railway in Bagalkote district, Karnataka, India. The station lies on the Gadag–Hotgi railway line, which serves Bagalkote and nearby towns with 3 platforms and was converted from meter gauge to broad gauge in December 2008. A new line is being constructed between Bagalkote and Kudachi. Railway stations have amenities such as a computerized reservation office, waiting room, retiring room book stall. It is a B category railway station.

== Developments ==
=== Proposed doubling & electrification works for Gadag–Kudagi–Hotgi section ===
Gadag–Hotgi railway line doubling is sanctioned in the year 2014–15 with part of length of this project, i.e. from Hotgi to Kudgi (134 km) is taken up under Customer funding model and for this purpose National Thermal Power Corporation deposited an amount of Rs.946 cr with Indian Railways. New crossing station at Kudgi with 4 lines for giving sideline connectivity to 4000 MW Super Thermal Power Plant was commissioned on 29.01.2017. Work is under progress in the Hotgi–Kudagi section. The stretch between Minchinal and Lachyan (42.5 km) is targeted for commissioning during 2017–18. Gadag–Hotgi section is also sanctioned for electrification and tenders are floated for the same.

=== Proposed new line project ===
A new railway branch line of 142 km is being constructed from Bagalkot to Kudachi via Kajjidoni (Khajjidoni) which was sanctioned in the year 2010–2011 with an anticipated cost of 986.30 cr on 50:50 cost sharing basis and land free of cost by Government of Karnataka. The section between Bagalkot and Kajjidoni has been completed and CRS inspection between Bagalkot–Khajdoni (30 km) was done on 14.06.2017. And a rail bus is running between Bagalkot–Khajjidoni 5 days a week from Mondays to Thursdays except Saturdays & Sundays. Further work can be taken up on acquisition of land by State Government.

== Preliminary Engineering - cum Traffic survey ==
Preliminary Engineering Cum Traffic Survey for New line between Daroji - Bagalkot (157 km) Detailed estimate vetted by accounts on 02.09.22. GD form sanctioned by CAO/CN to take up the work. Tender floated & opened on 19.10.2022. Under finalisation.

== Major trains ==
Trains those run through/from Bagalkot are:

- Gol Gumbaz Express
- Mumbai CSMT–Gadag Express*
- Basava Express
- Hubballi–Secunderabad Express
- Hubballi–Varanasi Weekly Express
- Mumbai CSMT–Gadag Express
- Yesvantpur–Barmer AC Express
- Yesvantpur–Bikaner Express
- Solapur–Hubballi Intercity Express
- Mysore–Sainagar Shirdi Express
- Solapur–Gadag DEMU Passenger
- Solapur–Dharwad Passenger
- Vijayapur–Hubballi Passenger
- Vijayapur–Yesvantpur Special Fare Daily Exp
- Vijayapur–Mangaluru Jn Special Fare Daily Exp
- Hubballi–Hazarat Nizamuddin SF Weekly Express via (Bijapur)
- Bagalkot–Khajjidoni Rail bus
