= Mallapur railway station =

Railway station in Karnataka, India

Mallapur Mallapura

General information
- Location: SH 30, Mallapur-582209 ,Gadag district, Karnataka; India
- Coordinates: 15°40′22″N 75°36′25″E
- System: Indian Railways station
- Owner: Indian Railways
- Operator: South Western Railway
- Line: Gadag–Hotgi line
- Platforms: 2
- Tracks: 2

Construction
- Structure type: Standard (on-ground station)
- Parking: No
- Cycle facilities: No

Other information
- Status: Functioning
- Station code: MLP
- Zone(s): South Western Railway
- Division(s): Hubli

History
- Electrified: Double Line Electrified
Location
- Location within Karnataka

Mallapur railway station (station code: MLP) falls under Hubli railway division of South Western Railway in Gadag district, Karnataka, India. Mallapur railway station has two platforms which serve mainly Mallapur Village and nearby Towns of Ron & Nargund and Pilgrimages travelling to Yamanur.

== Major trains ==
Trains that run through/from Mallapur are:

- Vijayapur–Hubballi Intercity Express
- Solapur–Gadag DEMU Passenger
- Solapur–Hubballi Passenger
- Solapur–Dharwad Passenger
- Vijayapur–Hubballi Passenger
- Vijayapur-Yesvantpur Special Fare Daily Exp
- Vijayapur-Mangaluru Jn Special Fare Daily Exp
