= Solapur–Guntakal section =

Part of the Mumbai–Chennai line

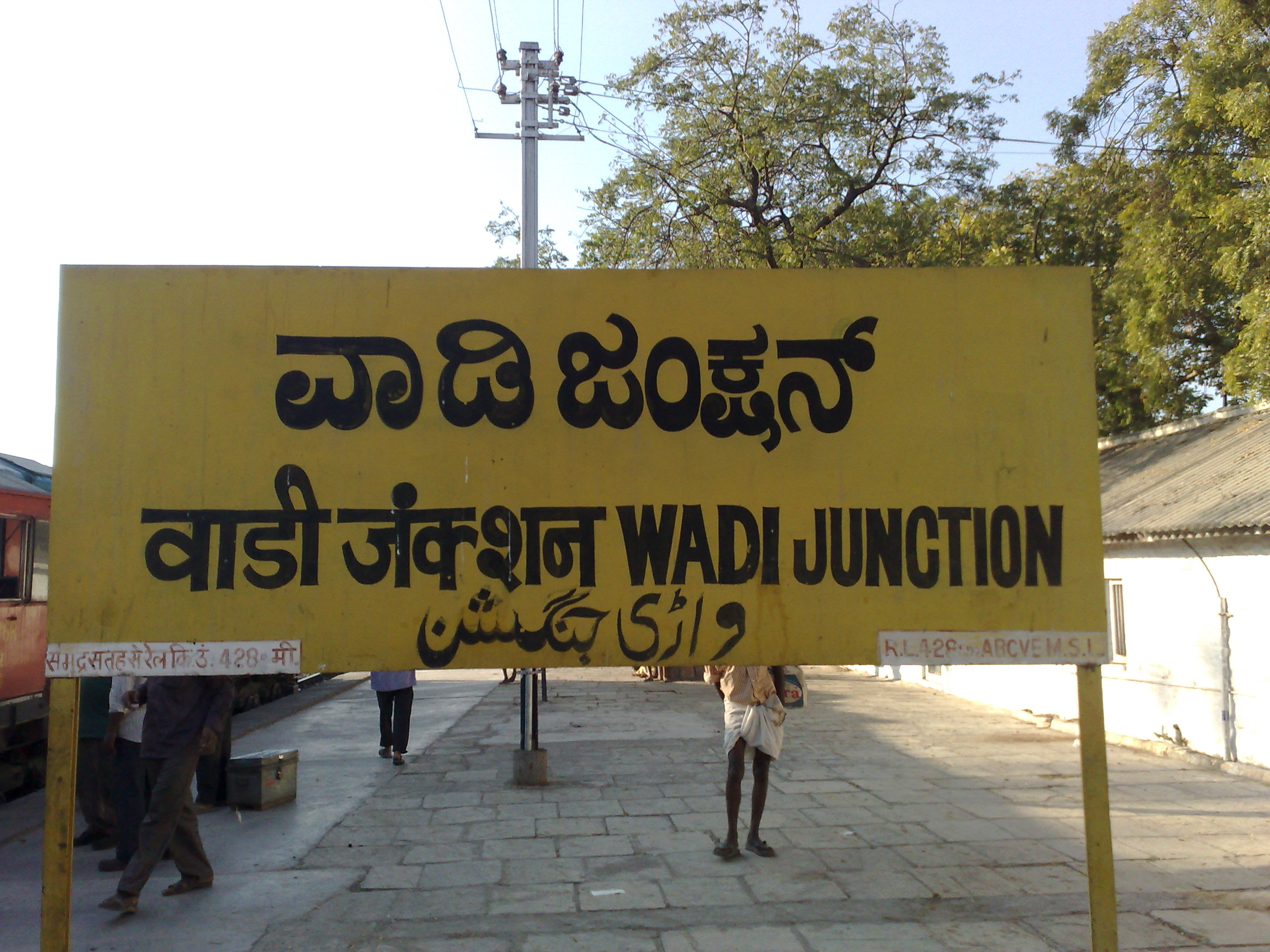
- Wadi Junction, an important railway station on Solapur–Guntakal section

Overview
- Status: Operational
- Owner: Indian Railways
- Locale: Maharashtra, Karnataka, Telangana, Andhra Pradesh
- Termini: Solapur; Guntakal

Service
- Services: Mumbai–Chennai line Mahabubnagar-Munirabad line
- Operator(s): Central Railway, South Central Railway, South Coast Railway, South Western Railway
- Depot: Guntakal
- Rolling stock: WDM-2, WDM-3A, WDM-3D and WDG-3A locos

History
- Opened: 1871; 155 years ago

Technical
- Track length: Main line: 379 km (235 mi); Branch lines: Solapur–Gadag: 301 km (187 mi); Wadi–Secunderabad: 185 km (115 mi); Vikrabad–Bidar: 91 km (57 mi)
- Number of tracks: 2/1
- Track gauge: 5 ft 6 in (1,676 mm) broad gauge
- Electrification: 25 kV 50 Hz AC overhead lines (Mumbai–Pune, Kalaburagi–Chennai)
- Operating speed: Main line: up to 130 km/h
- Highest elevation: Main line: Solapur 461 metres (1,512 ft); Branch line: Bijapur 597 metres (1,959 ft)

The Solapur–Guntakal section (also known as Solapur–Guntakal line) is part of the Mumbai–Chennai line. It connects Solapur in the Indian state of Maharashtra and Guntakal in Andhra Pradesh.

== History ==
Great Indian Peninsula Railway, opened the Pune–Raichur sector of the Mumbai–Chennai line in stages: the portion from Pune to Barshi Road was opened in 1859, from Barshi Road to Mohol in 1860 and from Mohol to Solapur also in 1860. Work on the line from Solapur southwards was begun in 1865 and the line was extended to Raichur in 1871. Thus the line met the line of Madras Railway thereby establishing direct Mumbai–Chennai link.

Madras Railway extended its trunk route to Beypur / Kadalundi (near Calicut) and initiated work on a north-western branch out of Arakkonam in 1861. The branch line reached Renigunta in 1862, and to Raichur in 1871, where it connected to the Great Indian Peninsula Railway line from Mumbai.

The kalaburagi–Secunderabad line was built in 1874 by the Nizam's Guaranteed State Railway.

The metre gauge Gadag–Hotgi section was opened in 1884 by the Southern Mahratta Railway. The line was converted to 5 ft 6 in (1,676 mm) broad gauge in 2008.

The Vikrabad–Bidar 1,676 mm (5 ft 6 in)-wide 5 ft 6 in (1,676 mm) broad gauge line was opened in 1932.

The 58 km (36 mi) long Raichur–Gadwal railway track was opened in 2013. Gadwal is on the Dhone–Kacheguda line.

The 120 km (75 mi) long Kalaburagi–Bidar railway track was opened in 2017.

== Electrification ==
The fully electrification complictíon. The Kalaburgi-Hotgi section got electrified in March 2021. The Kalaburgi-Wadi section was electrified in 2018 and electrification between Guntakal–Wadi section was completed in the year 2015. With this, the Mumbai Chennai section is fully electrified. In September 2022, the entire Mumbai-Chennai section was also doubled.

== Speed limit ==
The Kalyan–Pune–Daund-Wadi–Secunderabad–Kazipet line and the Wadi–Adoni-Arrakonam–Chennai Central line are classified as 'Group B' lines and can take speeds up to 130 km/h (81 mph).

== Sheds ==
Guntakal diesel loco shed was started as a metre-gauge shed but after gauge conversions in Guntakal and Hubballi divisions, it was converted to broad-gauge shed in 1995. It houses WDM-2, WDM-3A, WDM-3D and WDG-3A locos. There is a routine overhaul depot for wagon maintenance at Raichur and a coaching maintenance depot at Guntakal. A new electric shed is under construction and almost complete at Guntakal. Gooty has now a Diesel cum Electric shed and now homes around 30 high-power freight 3-phase WAG-9 locos.

== Passenger movement ==
Solapur is the only station on this line which is amongst the top hundred booking stations of Indian Railway.
