= Hubballi–Lokmanya Tilak Terminus Express =

Express train in Karnataka, India

Hubballi – Lokmanya Tilak Terminus Express
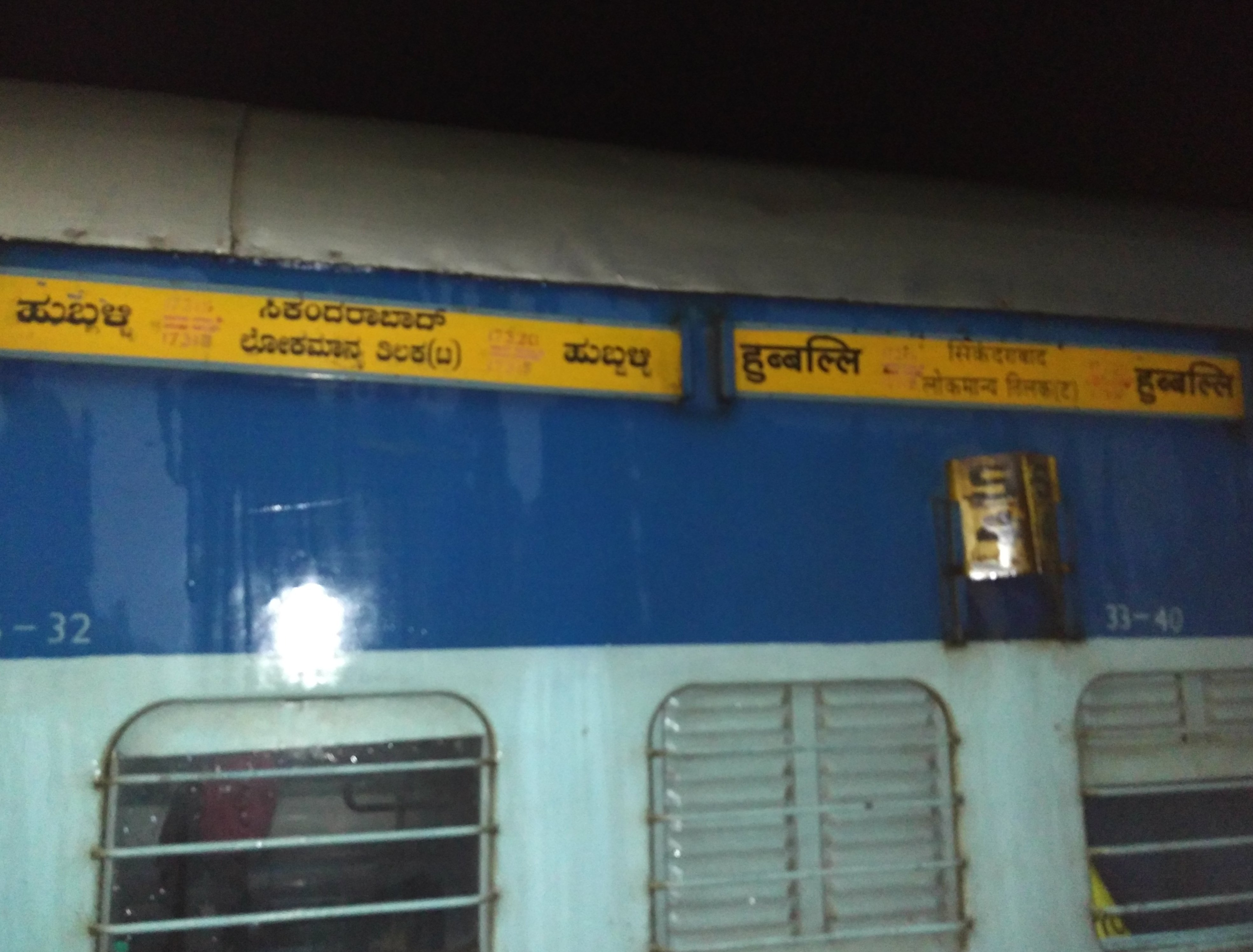
- Sleeper coach of Hubballi – Lokmanya Tilak Terminus Express

Overview
- Service type: Express
- Current operator: South Western Railway

Route
- Termini: LTT; Hubballi
- Stops: 14
- Distance travelled: 728 km (452 mi)
- Average journey time: 15 hours 30 minutes as 17317 Hubballi-LTT Express, 16 hours 15 minutes as 17318 LTT-Hubballi Express
- Service frequency: Daily
- Train number: 17317 / 17318

On-board services
- Classes: AC 2 tier, AC 3 tier, Sleeper Class, General Unreserved
- Seating arrangements: Yes
- Sleeping arrangements: Yes
- Catering facilities: No pantry car attached

Technical
- Rolling stock: Standard Indian Railways coaches
- Track gauge: 1,676 mm (5 ft 6 in)
- Operating speed: 44 km/h (27 mph) average, including halts

17317 / 17318 Hubballi–Lokmanya Tilak Terminus Express is an express train belonging to Indian Railways that links Mumbai with Hubballi in Karnataka. It runs between Lokmanya Tilak Terminus and Hubballi daily and is operated by South Western Railways. This train runs on the LTT→Thane→Panvel→Pune→Sangli →Miraj→Belgaum→Londa→Hubballi route. Recently there is demand to provide halt at Kirloskarvadi which is a large industrial township between Sangli and Karad stations. The halt is likely to be approved by the Rail Board very soon.

== Service ==
The Hubballi–Lokmanya Tilak Terminus Express covers a distance of 728 across Karnataka and Maharashtra in 15 hours and 30 minutes. As the average speed of the train is below 55 km/h, its fare does not include a superfast surcharge. The coach composition includes 6 unreserved 2nd class coaches, 6 sleeper coaches, 1 AC 2 Tier and 1 AC 3 tier coaches.

== Traction ==
The train is hauled by a WAP-4 of bhusaval shed end to end

== Halts ==
The train halts at the following stations in both directions.

- Hubballi
- Dharwad
- Alnavar
- Londa Junction
- Belagavi
- Ghataprabha
- Raybag
- Kudachi
- Miraj Junction
- Sangli
- Karad
- Satara
- Pune Junction
- Lonavala
- Panvel
- Thane
- Lokmanya Tilak Terminus
