= Yamanur =

- Village
- Nickname: Yamanur
- Location in Karnataka, India Yamanur (India)
- Coordinates: 15°32′59″N 75°21′53″E
- Country: India
- State: Karnataka
- District: Dharwad
- Founder: Sunil Mohite & Family
- Talukas: Navalgund

Government
  - Type: BJP Panchayat raj
  - Body: Gram panchayat

Population (2011)
  - Total: 2,211

Languages Kannada and Marati
  - Official: Kannada
- Time zone: UTC+5:30 (IST)
- PIN: 582208
- ISO 3166 code: IN-KA
- Vehicle registration: KA
- Website: karnataka.gov.in

Yamanur is a village in the southern state of Karnataka, India. It is located in the Navalgund taluk of Dharwad district in Karnataka.

== Demographics ==
As of the 2011 Census of India there were 441 households in Yamanur and a total population of 2,211 consisting of 1,114 males and 1,097 females. There were 242 children ages 0–6.

== See also ==
- Dharwad
- Districts of Karnataka
