= Holealur =

Holealur Holealooru
- Village
- Location within Karnataka Location within India
- Coordinates: 15°49′29″N 75°38′48″E
- Country: India
- State: Karnataka
- District: Gadag district
- Taluk: Ron
- Lok Sabha Constituency: Bagalkote

Population (2011)
  - Total: 8,095

Languages
  - Official: Kannada
- Time zone: UTC+5:30 (IST)
- PIN: 582203
- Vehicle registration: KA 26

Holealur also spelled as Holealooru is a large village in the Ron taluk of Gadag district in the Indian state of Karnataka.

== Demographics ==
As of 2011 India census, Holealur had a population of 8095 with 4045 males and 4050 females. In Holealur village population of children with age 0-6 is 1016 which makes up 12.55 % of total population of village. Average Sex Ratio of Holealur village is 1001 which is higher than Karnataka state average of 973. Child Sex Ratio for the Holealur as per census is 932, lower than Karnataka average of 948.

== Literacy ==
Holealur village has higher literacy rate compared to Karnataka. In 2011, literacy rate of Holealur village was 81.13 % compared to 75.36 % of Karnataka. In Holealur Male literacy stands at 91.28 % while female literacy rate was 71.10 %.

== Importance ==
Holealur is famous for the wooden handicrafts.

== Educational Institutes in Holealur ==
1. Shri Kalmeshwara Vidya Prasaraka Samiti.
2. Shri Yachareshwara Balavikasa Vidya Mandira.
3. Sanjay High School.
4. Govt. Primary School.
5. Jnanasindhu Residential School (For The Visually Challenged).

== Notable People from Holealur ==
1. Shri Aluru Venkataraya Kannada Kula Purohita
2. Shri R. S. Mugali

== Karnataka Ekikarana Movement ==
Main article: Shri Aluru Venkataraya

Shri Aluru Venkataraya from Holealur is revered as Karnataka Kulapurohita (High priest of the Kannada family) in the Karnataka region for his contribution towards the cause of a separate Karnataka state. He became famous for undertaking a Karnataka Ekikarana movement in support of the formation of a state for the Kannada-speaking population of Mysore, Bombay Presidency and the Nizam's Hyderabad.

== Distance to Major Cities ==
Holealur to,

Ron - 18 km

Badami - 22 km

Konnur - 24 km

Gadag district - 57 km (By Road) and 49 km (By Indian Railways)

Bagalkote District - 63 km (By Road) and 45 km (By Indian Railways)

Huballi - 79 km (By Road) and 107 km (By Railways)

== See also ==
- Districts of Karnataka
