= Hotgi =

- Village
- Location in Maharashtra, India
- Coordinates: 17°35′N 75°59′E
- Country: India
- State: Maharashtra
- District: Solapur

Languages
  - Official: Marathi
- Time zone: UTC+5:30 (IST)
- PIN: 413215
- Vehicle registration: MH-62
- Coastline: 0 kilometres (0 mi)

Hotgi is a village located in Solapur district in the Indian state of Maharashtra.

== Geography ==
Hotgi village covers a total geographical area of 3,221 hectares.

== Demographics ==
As of the 2011 census, Hotgi has a population of 6,539 people. Of this total population, 3,375 are male, and 3,164 are female. The village boasts a literacy rate of 67.67%, with 76.50% of males and 58.25% of females being literate. Hotgi is home to approximately 1,207 households.

== Notable sites ==
=== NTPC ===
One of the most prominent landmarks near Hotgi is the "National Thermal Power Corporation (NTPC)", situated approximately 3 kilometers away from the village. This power plant plays a crucial role in the region's energy generation and infrastructure development.

The estimated project cost of NTPC's Solapur thermal power plant, initially set at ₹12,000 crore, is now facing the possibility of a ₹500 crore increase due to the additional compensation being sought by project-affected families. This development has raised concerns about the potential impact on power tariffs for consumers in the five States with which the company has entered into long-term power purchase agreements. These agreements encompass electricity distribution companies in Maharashtra, Tamil Nadu, Jharkhand, Madhya Pradesh, and Goa. Among these States, Maharashtra stands to receive the lion's share, with 55 percent of the total available power. As a result, preliminary estimations indicate that consumers in these regions might experience a tariff hike ranging between 5 and 10 paise, a move necessitated by the increased project costs and compensation demands. This situation highlights the delicate balance between the needs of project-affected families and the economic implications for consumers in the quest for sustainable energy infrastructure development.

== Transportation ==
=== Hotgi Junction ===
Hotgi boasts the 4-platform Hotgi Railway Station, also referred to as Hotgi Junction. This railway station is a vital transportation hub, serving as the main junction of the Central Railway.
