= Kalaburagi Junction railway station =

Railway station in Karnataka, India

Kalaburagi Junction Gulbarga Junction
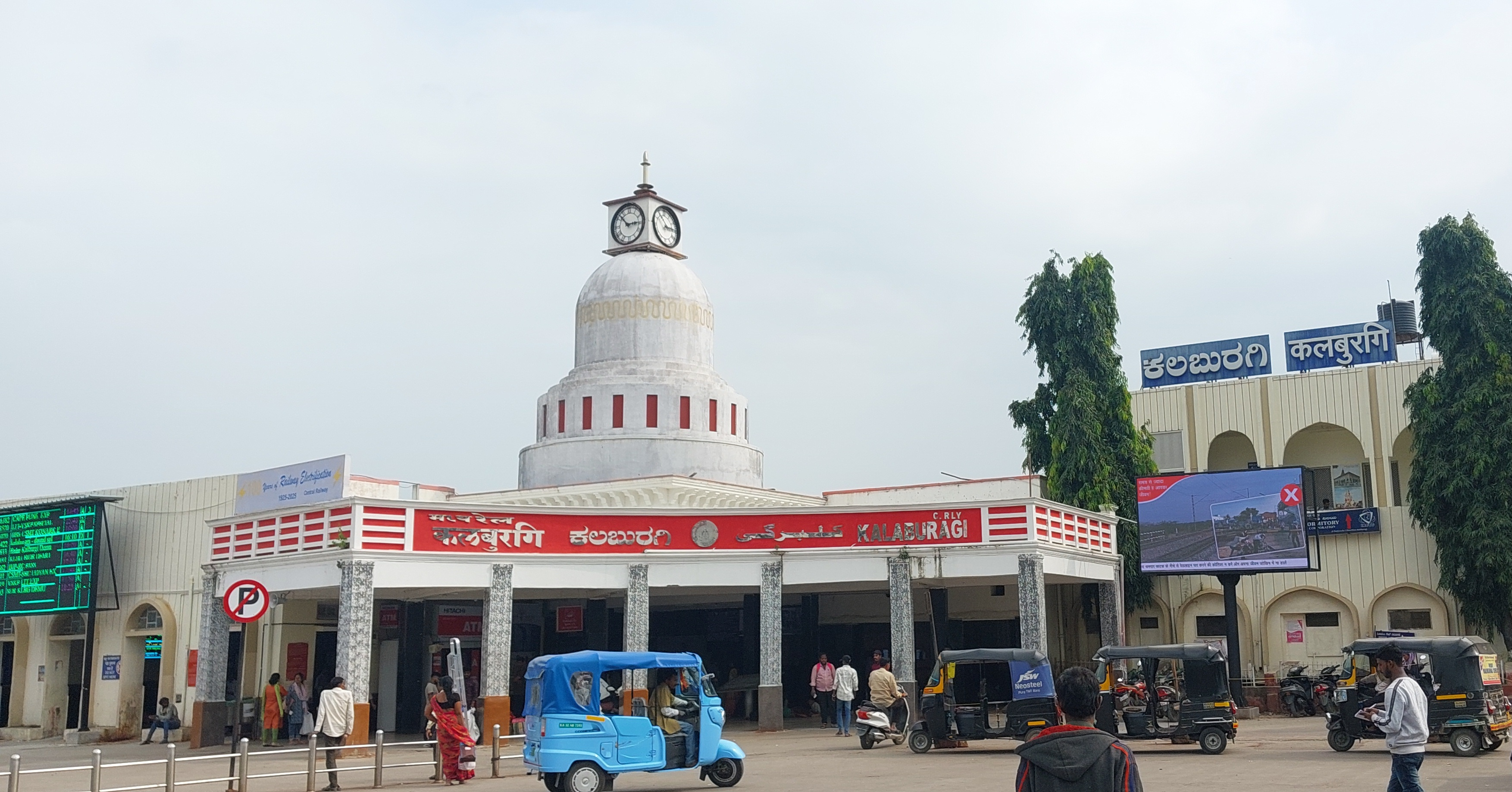
- Kalaburagi railway station building

General information
- Location: Station Road, Kalaburagi; India
- Coordinates: 17°18′54″N 76°49′26″E
- Elevation: 454 metres (1,490 ft)
- System: Indian Railways station
- Owner: Indian Railways
- Operator: Central Railway
- Lines: Solapur–Guntakal section of Mumbai–Chennai line, Kalaburagi -Bidar Line, Kalaburagi -Latur Line
- Platforms: 4 ( upgrading to 6 )
- Tracks: 8

Construction
- Structure type: Standard on ground
- Parking: Yes
- Cycle facilities: No

Other information
- Status: Functioning
- Station code: KLBG

History
- Opened: 1871
Location
- Location within India Location within Karnataka

Kalaburagi Junction railway station, formerly Gulbarga Junction railway station (Station code: KLBG) is located in Kalaburagi district in the Indian state of Karnataka and serves Kalaburagi. It was identified as one of the A1 category Stations in 2016. Currently categorised as NSG-2 station under Indian Railways.

== History ==
The Great Indian Peninsula Railway extended its Mumbai–Solapur line to Raichur in 1871 and worked on that line from 1865.

Construction of the Kalaburagi–Bidar 110 km link has got completed and inaugurated by Prime minister Narendra Modi on 29 October 2017.

The railway track in the Daund–Wadi sector is being doubled at a cost of Rs. 700 crore.

== Line and location ==
Indian Railways also has plans for extending the railway line from Kalaburagi to Latur via Aland, Umarga, Ausa to Latur which in turn will pave way for Gulbarga to have direct connectivity to Aurangabad, Latur, Nanded, Akola, Nagpur many other cities of Maharashtra which are located in neighbouring state of Maharashtra. There are also consideration to add new line from Kalaburagi to Vijaypura via Jewargi.

== Electrification ==
As of 2013, electrification work in the 641 km Pune–Wadi–Guntakal sector have been initiated. As of December 2017, the Wadi to Kalaburagi section has been completed and charged with 25 kV AC. The CRS inspection is pending scheduling, but after a successful inspection this section will be thrown open to electric trains.

== Amenities ==
Kalaburagi railway station has a computerized reservation counter, public call office with subscribers’ trunk dialing facilities, waiting room, retiring rooms, vegetarian and non-vegetarian refreshment stalls, light refreshment stall, tea stall, book stall, escalators on platforms 1 and 2–3 and 2 general and platform ticket counters opposite railway station entrance for passenger convenience.

== Station upgrades ==
Kalaburagi railway station is remodeled with the addition of a fourth platform, extension of the existing platforms and installation of two escalators. Addition of a dormitory and the addition of a new railway overbridge are yet to be completed. A new entrance facing the Tarafail area has also been constructed.

Preceding station	Indian Railways	Following station
Bablad towards ?	Central Railway zone Solapur–Guntakal section	Hirenandru towards ?
