= Raichur railway station =

Train station in Karnataka, India

Raichur Junction
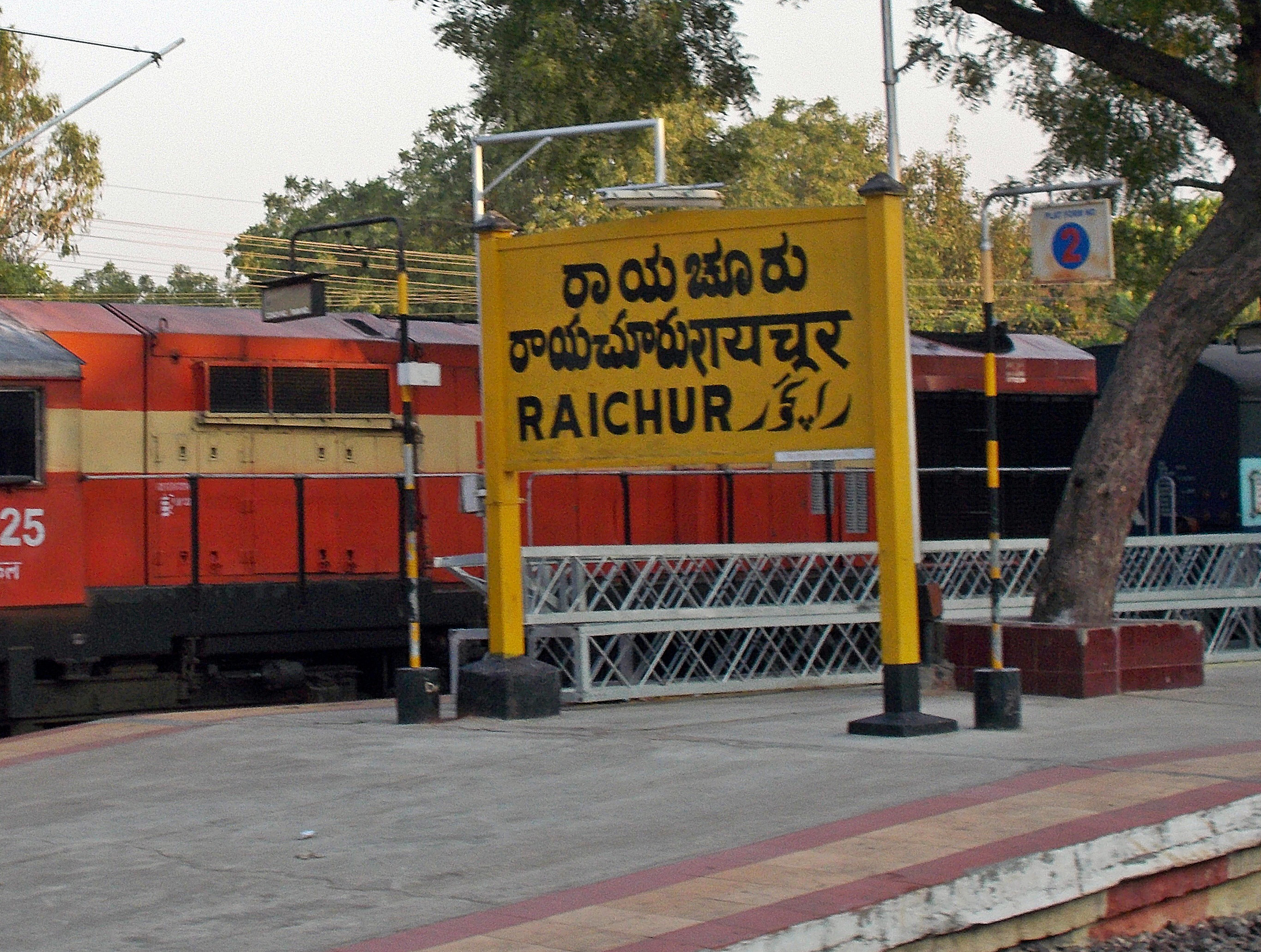
- Raichur Junction Railway station Board

General information
- Location: Azad Nagar, Raichur, Karnataka; India
- Coordinates: 16°11′37″N 77°20′22″E
- Elevation: 406 metres (1,332 ft)
- System: Indian Railways junction station
- Owner: Indian Railways
- Operator: South Central Railway
- Lines: Solapur-Guntakal Section; Gadwal–Raichur line Mahabubnagar-Munirabad line
- Platforms: 3
- Tracks: 5
- Connections: Bengaluru, Mumbai, Delhi, Chennai, Tirupati, Hyderabad, Pune, Solapur, Mysore, Varanasi, Gorakhpur, Vasco da Gama, Ahmedabad, Jaipur, Rajkot, Coimbatore, Kanniyakumari, Hubbli, Belagavi, Kalaburgi, Jammu Tawi, Hassan

Construction
- Structure type: Standard on ground
- Parking: Available
- Accessible: Yes

Other information
- Status: Functioning
- Station code: RC
- Zone(s): South Central Railway zone

History
- Opened: 1871
Location
- Location within Karnataka Location within India

Raichur Junction railway station, also known as Raichuru Junction railway station (station code:RC), is located in Raichur district in the Indian state of Karnataka and serves Raichur and the surrounding industrially efflorescent area. The station has three platforms.

== History ==
Raichur was the meeting point of two great railway systems of yesteryears – the Great Indian Peninsula Railway and Madras Railway. While the former started construction from Mumbai, the latter from Chennai. The two systems met at Raichur in 1871.

The 58 km long Raichur–Gadwal railway track was opened in 2013. Gadwal is on the Dhone–Kacheguda line.

It is the fourth busiest railway station in Karnataka after Bangalore City Junction, Yesvantpur Junction and Hubbali Junction.

New line is constructing from Ginegera (Koppala district) to Mahaboob Nagar via Gangavathi, Sindhanoor, Manvi and Raichur. First phase Ginigera to Raichur estimated to complete in 2022. Completion of this line will make Raichur a large junction with access to Goa, coastal central and southern Karnataka. The distance between Hyderabad and Mangalore will reduce drastically.

== Classification ==
Raichur is classified as an A–category station in the Secunderabad railway division.

== Electrification ==
Electrification work in the 641 km Pune–Wadi–Guntakal sector have been completed from Guntakal Junction to Kalaburgi Junction (GULBARGA) and other part of the project getting electrified.

Preceding station	Indian Railways	Following station
Yermaras towards ?	South Central Railway zone Solapur–Guntakal section	Marichethal towards ?
