= Hubballi–Varanasi Weekly Express =

Train in India

Varanasi – Hubballi Weekly Express
Overview
- Service type: Express
- First service: 23 May 2017; 9 years ago (Inaugural run)
- Current operator: South Western Railway zone

Route
- Termini: Varanasi Junction (BSB); Hubballi Junction (UBL)
- Stops: 22
- Distance travelled: 2,030 km (1,261 mi)
- Average journey time: 42h 5m
- Service frequency: Weekly (Note: Runs one day in a week for every direction.)
- Train number: 17324/17323

On-board services
- Classes: AC II Tier, AC III Tier, Sleeper Class, General Unreserved
- Seating arrangements: No
- Sleeping arrangements: Yes
- Catering facilities: On-board Catering; E-Catering
- Observation facilities: ICF coach
- Entertainment facilities: No
- Baggage facilities: No
- Other facilities: Below the seats

Technical
- Rolling stock: 2
- Track gauge: 1,676 mm (5 ft 6 in)
- Operating speed: 48 km/h (30 mph), including halts
Route map
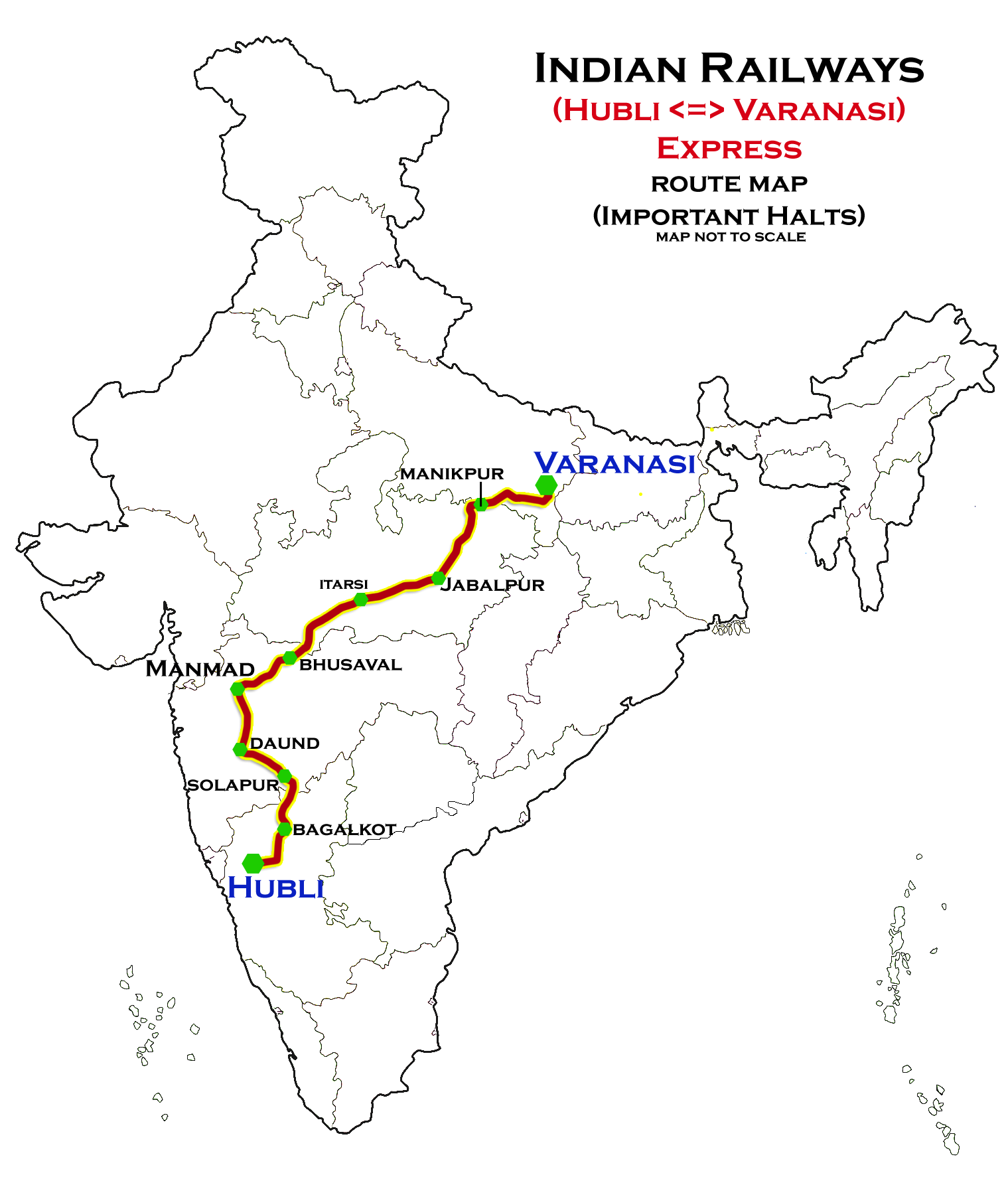

The Varanasi – Hubballi Weekly Express is an Express train belonging to South Western Railway zone that runs between Varanasi Junction and Hubballi Junction in India. It is currently being operated with 17324/17323 train numbers on a weekly basis.

== Service ==
17324/Varanasi – Hubballi Weekly Express has an average speed of 51 km/h and covers 2035 km in 39h 55m .

The 17323/Hubballi – Varanasi Weekly Express has an average speed of 48 km/h and covers 2035 km in 42h 5m.

== Route and halts ==
The important halts of the train are:

- [[Varanasi Junction railway station|]]
- [[Mirzapur railway station|]]
- [[Allahabad Cheoki Junction railway station|]]
- [[Satna Junction railway station|]]
- [[Maihar railway station|]]
- [[Katni Junction railway station|]]
- [[Jabalpur Junction railway station|]]
- [[Itarsi Junction railway station|]]
- [[Khandwa Junction railway station|]]
- [[Bhusaval Junction railway station|]]
- [[Manmad Junction railway station|]]
- [[Daund Junction railway station|]]
- [[Solapur railway station|]]
- [[Bijapur railway station|]]
- [[Bagalkot railway station|]]
- [[Badami railway station|]]
- [[Gadag Junction railway station|]]
- [[Hubballi Junction railway station|]]

== Coach composite ==
The train has standard ICF Utkrisht Rakes with max speed of 110 km/h. The train consists of 21 coaches :

- 1 AC II Tier
- 2 AC III Tier
- 6 Sleeper Coaches
- 6 General
- 2 Generators cum Luggage cum Parcel Car

== Traction ==
Both trains are hauled by a Hubli Loco Shed based WDP-4 diesel locomotive from Varanasi Junction to Hubballi Junction and vice versa.

== Direction reversal ==
Train Reverses its direction 1 times:

- Gadag Junction

== See also ==
- Varanasi Junction railway station
- Hubli Junction railway station
- Mysore – Varanasi Express
- Vishwamanava Express
