= Vijayapura, Bengaluru North =

Vijayapur
- Town
- Location in Karnataka, India Vijayapur (India)
- Coordinates: 13°17′48.348″N 77°47′57.088″E
- Country: India
- State: Karnataka
- District: Bengaluru North
- Elevation: 883 m (2,897 ft)

Population (2011)
  - Total: 34,866

Languages
  - Official: Kannada
- Time zone: UTC+5:30 (IST)
- PINs: 586101 to 586217
- ISO 3166 code: IN-KA
- Vehicle registration: KA
- Website: vijayapuratown.mrc.gov.in

Vijayapur is a town in Devanahalli taluk and Bengaluru North district in the Indian state of Karnataka. Vijayapura's old name is Vadigenahalli. Local villagers still refer Vijayapura as Vadigenahalli.

== Climate ==
Vijayapura is ranked among top 10 Indian cities with the cleanest air and best AQI (Air Quality Index) in 2024.

== Geography ==
Vijayapura is located at 13.29°N 77.8°E. It has an average elevation of 883 metres (2896 feet).

== Demographics ==
As of 2001 India census, Vijayapura had a population of 29,458. Males constitute 52% of the population and females 48%. Vijayapura has an average literacy rate of 64%, higher than the national average of 59.5%: male literacy is 69%, and female literacy is 59%. In Vijayapura, 13% of the population is under 6 years of age.

Vijayapur was formerly known as Vadagenhalli, a corrupt form of veda-gaana-halli .
