= Hotgi Junction railway station =

Railway Station in Maharashtra, India

Hotgi Junction
- Indian Railways logo

General information
- Location: Hotgi, Maharashtra; India
- Coordinates: 17.5652°N 75.9896°E
- Elevation: 473 metres (1,552 ft)
- System: Light rail & Regional rail
- Owner: Indian Railways
- Operator: Central Railway zone
- Lines: Gadag–Hotgi line Guntakal–Hotgi line
- Platforms: 3
- Tracks: 3

Construction
- Structure type: Standard (on ground station)
- Parking: Yes
- Cycle facilities: Yes
- Accessible: Disabled access

Other information
- Status: Functioning
- Station code: HG
- Zone(s): Central Railway zone
- Division(s): Solapur
- Fare zone: Indian Railways

History
- Opened: 1884; 142 years ago
Location
- Location within India Location within Maharashtra

Hotgi Junction (Station code: HG) is a railway junction station under Solapur Railway Division of Central Railway zone of Indian Railways located at Hotgi village in Solapur district.

== History ==
In 1881 the Bombay Eastern Deccan Railway was under construction with William Michell the Engineer-in-Charge. This line immediately upon opening became the Bijapur Branch of the Southern Mahratta Railway.

The Southern Mahratta Railway (SMR) was founded in 1882 to construct a metre gauge(MG) railway between Hotgi and Gadag (opened to traffic in 1884), one of the "famine lines" set up with a guarantee.

== Established ==
The Hotgi railway station was opened in 1884, when the Southern Mahratta Railway started to build metre-gauge railway line between Hotgi and Gadag in 1882, which was completed in the year 1884.

== Development ==
Gadag–Hotgi rail doubling is sanctioned in the year 2014–15. Doubling for part length of this project, i.e. from Hotgi–Kudgi (134 km) is taken up under Customer Funding Model. For this purpose NTPC have deposited Rs.946 cr. with Railway. New Crossing station @ Kudgi with 4 lines for giving connectivity to NTPC was commissioned on 29.01.2017. Work is in progress in the section between Minchinal–Lachyan (42.5 km) is targeted for commissioning during 2017–18.

== Services ==
It connects to Solapur Junction on north-west direction, Gulburga and Wadi Junction on south-east direction, Bijapur and Gadag Junction on south direction.

== Lines ==
The Hotgi–Gadag railway line was metre gauge and converted to broad gauge in stages. The conversion was finally completed in December 2008. Now Hotgi is connected to Hubli and Hospet by direct trains. Bangalore–Solapur train now runs via Bijapur and Hotgi.
