= Bijapur railway station =

Railway station in Karnataka, India

Vijayapura Bijapur
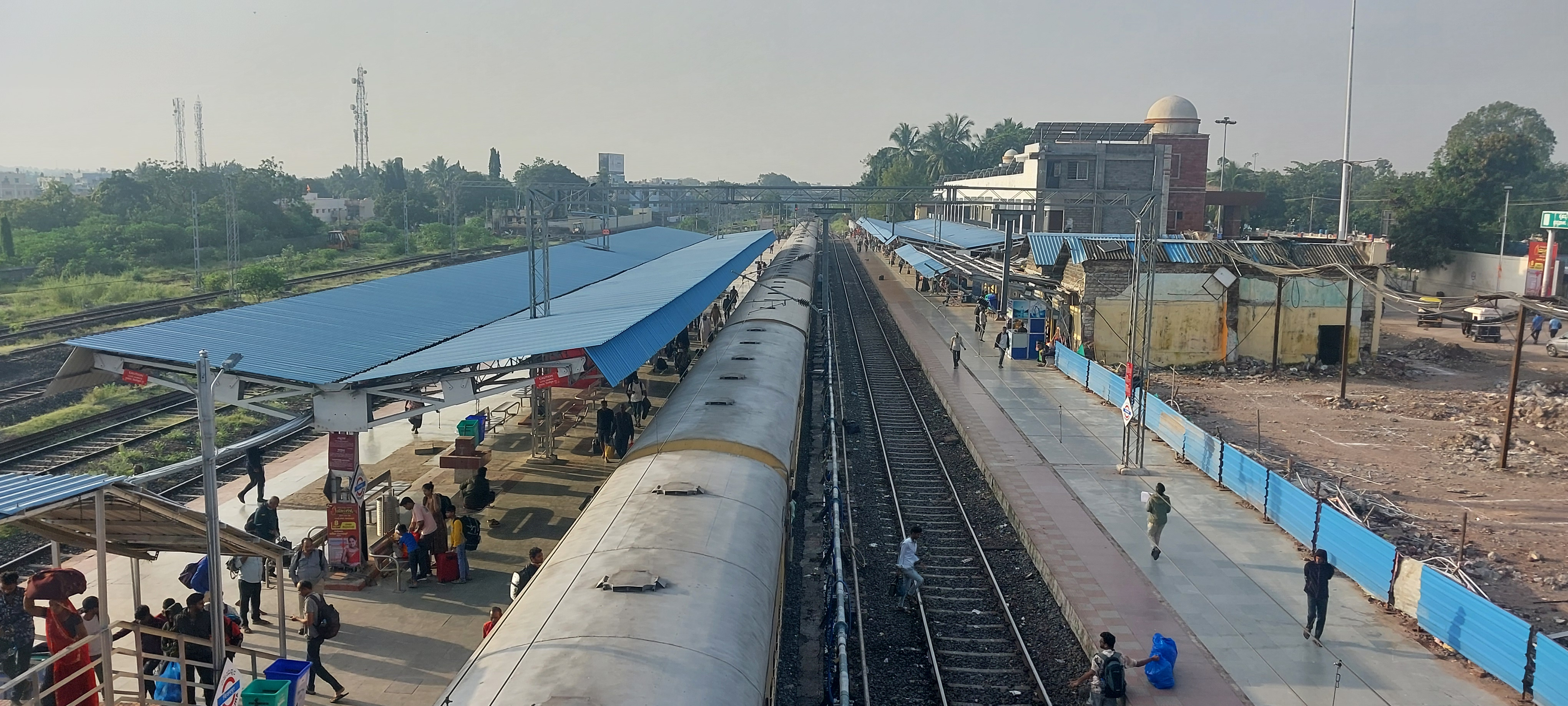
- Bijapur railway station

General information
- Location: Station Road, Bijapur; India
- Coordinates: 16°49′50″N 75°44′22″E
- Elevation: 597 metres (1,959 ft)
- System: Indian Railways station
- Line: Solapur–Gadag branch line
- Platforms: 5

Construction
- Structure type: Standard on ground
- Parking: Available
- Cycle facilities: Available

Other information
- Status: Functioning
- Station code: BJP
- Zone(s): South Western Railway zone
- Division(s): Hubballi

History
- Opened: 1884; 142 years ago
- Electrified: Double Electric-Line

Passengers
- 02 to 05 Million Passenger per year
- Computerized Ticketing Counters Parking Disabled Access WC Public Transportation
Location
- Location within Karnataka

Vijayapura railway station, formerly Bijapur railway station (Station code: BJP) is a railway station under South Western Railway located at Vijayapura in Vijayapura district in the Indian state of Karnataka. It is an "A" Category ISO 14001- 2015 (Environmental Management System) certified Station on (10.02.2020).

== History ==
The 1,000 mm (3 ft 3 3/8 in)-wide metre-gauge Gadag–Hotgi section was opened in 1884 and the Hotgi–Sholapur section in 1887 by the Southern Mahratta Railway. The line was converted to 5 ft 6 in (1,676 mm) broad gauge in 2008. In 1881 the Bombay Eastern Deccan Railway was under construction with William Michell the Engineer-in-Charge. This line immediately upon opening became the Bijapur branch of the Southern Mahratta Railway. [1]

The Southern Mahratta Railway (SMR) was founded in 1882 to construct a metre-gauge (MG) railway between Hotgi and Gadag (opened to traffic in 1884), one of the "famine lines" set up with a guarantee. In the same year (1882), it was contracted by the Indian State of Mysore to work the several metre-gauge lines that the Mysore State had built or was in the course of construction.

In 1888, a line was extended from Londa towards the Portuguese colony of Goa where it connected with the Marmagao line at Castle Rock. (From 1902 this line was leased as the West of India Portuguese Railway.) By 1890, this line extended from Londa eastwards via Guntakal to Bezwada, and northwards to Poona, turning the SMR from an assortment of branches to a real railway network.

In 1908, the SMR merged with the Madras Railway to form the Madras and Southern Mahratta Railway

== Developments ==
Gadag–Hotgi Rail Doubling is sanctioned in the year 2014–15 Doubling for part length of this project, i.e. from Hotgi–Kudgi (134 km) is taken up under Customer Funding Model. For this purpose NTPC have deposited Rs.946 cr. with Railway. New crossing station @ Kudgi with 4 lines for giving connectivity to NTPC was commissioned on 29.01.2017. doubling Work is Completed in the section between Hotgi jn-Wandal station Tenders valued @ Rs 14 crores have been called for redevelopment of the station. Gadag–Hotgi section is also sanctioned for electrification and tenders are floated for the same.

M/s Kalpataru PowerTransmission Ltd, Gandhinagar has been awarded for electrification of Hotgi to Gadag.

== Future ==
Karnataka state government had proposed eleven new railway projects in the state. The vijayapura–Shahabad new line project was one of these proposed new lines to be constructed on a public-private partnership basis. The Railway Board had proposed to undertake the vijayapura –Shahabad project along with other projects on PPP mode in 2010–11. As the project was meant to initiate and expedite development of the area, the state government will be providing the land required for the projects free of cost, apart from partial funding. The Railway Board entrusted this and other similar projects to Rail Vikas Nigam Limited, a special purpose vehicle established by the railways for undertaking projects on PPP mode. However, as the private sector has not evinced any interest in such projects and because of shortage of funds for new projects the Railway Board has asked the state government to fund the project.

Preceding station	Indian Railways	Following station
Aliyabad towards ?	South Western Railway zone Solapur–Gadag branch line	Ibrahimpur towards ?
