= Hubballi Junction railway station =

Railway station in Karnataka, India

Shree Siddharoodha Swamiji Hubballi Junction Śrī Sid'dhārūḍha Svāmīji Hubbaḷḷi Jaṅkṣan
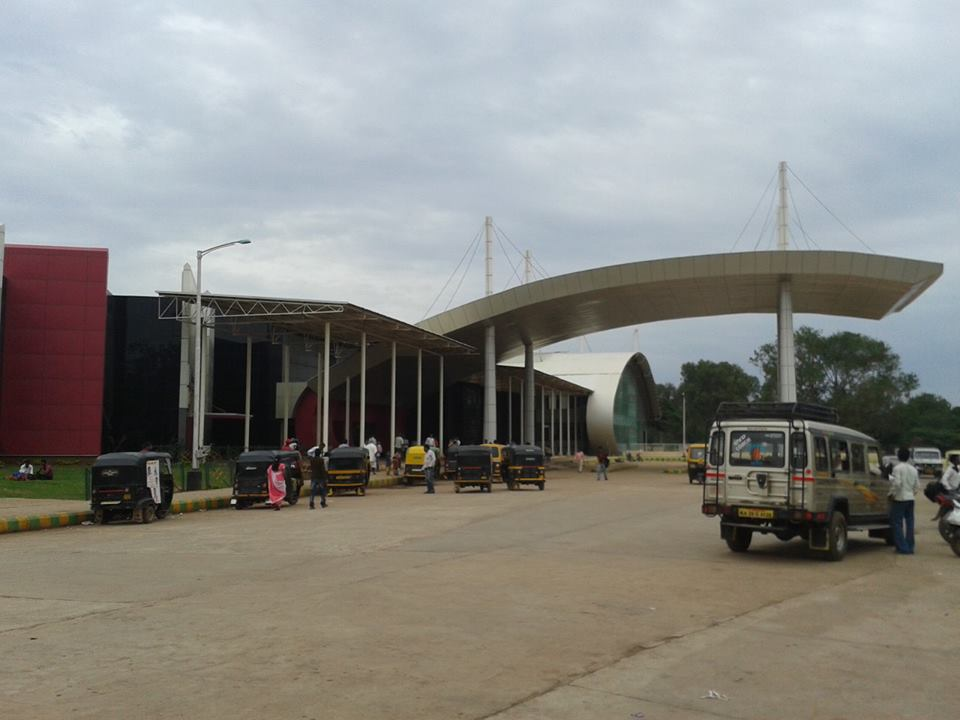
- Entrance of the station

General information
- Other names: Hubballi Junction; SSS Hubballi
- Location: Near Railway Colony, NH 63, Hubballi–580 020. Karnataka; India
- Coordinates: 15.3500°N 75.1491°E
- Elevation: 626.97 metres (2,057.0 ft)
- Owner: Indian Railways
- Operator: South Western Railways
- Lines: Guntakal–Vasco da Gama section Bangalore–Arsikere–Hubli line
- Platforms: 8 platforms Length– 1,507 m (4,944 ft)
- Tracks: 12
- Connections: Auto stand, HD BRTS, CBT Hubballi

Construction
- Structure type: standard on ground
- Parking: Yes
- Cycle facilities: Yes
- Accessible: Available

Other information
- Status: Functioning
- Station code: UBL
- Zone(s): South Western Railway zone
- Division(s): Hubballi

History
- Opened: 1886; 140 years ago
Location
- Location within Karnataka
- Interactive map

Shree Siddharoodha Swamiji Hubballi Junction Railway Station (Station code: UBL), is a railway junction station under Hubballi railway division of South Western Railway zone (SWR) of Indian Railways situated in Hubballi, Karnataka, India. The platform number 1 of Hubballi Junction has a length of 1,507 metres, making it the longest railway platform in the world as of March 2023.

SSS Hubballi Junction Railway Station has three entrances to get into station. One is the main entrance, the other in front of Central Railway Hospital of Gadag road, and the third one few metres ahead of main entrance i.e near yard. The station has an interesting platform bifurcation. It has total 8 platforms, five of them are alike other stations i.e one beside the other, and the other three in the next entry. The longest platform is divided into two parts, it has platform no. 1 and 8 on same platform.

== Description ==
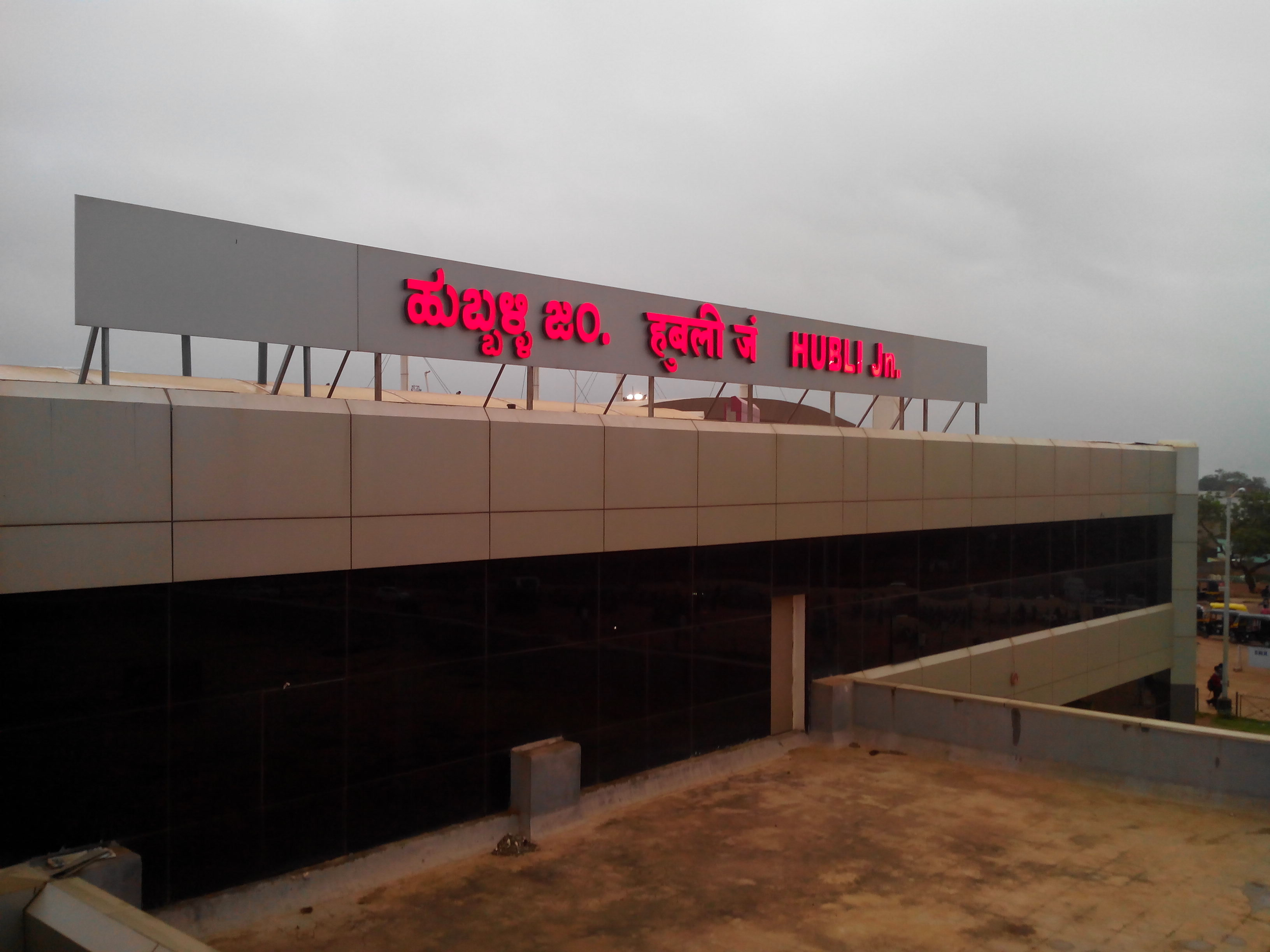
Hubli Junction station during redevelopment

Hubballi Junction is public and commercial transportation hub in Karnataka, connecting northwest to Mumbai (460 kilometres (290 mi)), west to Goa (160 kilometres (99 mi)), south to Bengaluru (410 kilometres (250 mi)) and east to Hyderabad (450 kilometres (280 mi)) with heavy mass transportation.

It is the second-busiest railway station in Karnataka, after KSR Bengaluru. The Hubballi division situated in Hubballi city connects Bengaluru, Mysuru, Mangaluru, Hyderabad, Mumbai, New Delhi, Chennai, Thiruvananthapuram, Goa and more.

Commercial goods such as manganese are the main source of income, with public transport being secondary.

The Hubballi Junction (under Hubballi Division) has Goods Shed, Diesel Loco Shed, Carriage Repair Workshop, Train Yard, and many more of Railways. The station was opened in the late 19th century c. 1886-87 by the British Company; it is currently one of the oldest railway stations in the state. It was an important station for both passengers as well as goods from the old era itself. It has major importance in the South Western Railway jurisdiction. It has connection to almost every part of India, Bengaluru, Chennai, Trivandrum, Mumbai, Pune, Ahmedabad, Udaipur, New Delhi, Varanasi, Kolkata, Hyderabad, Vishakhapatnam, Madgaon-Vasco-Goa and many more. The station is the second busiest in the zone after Bengaluru.

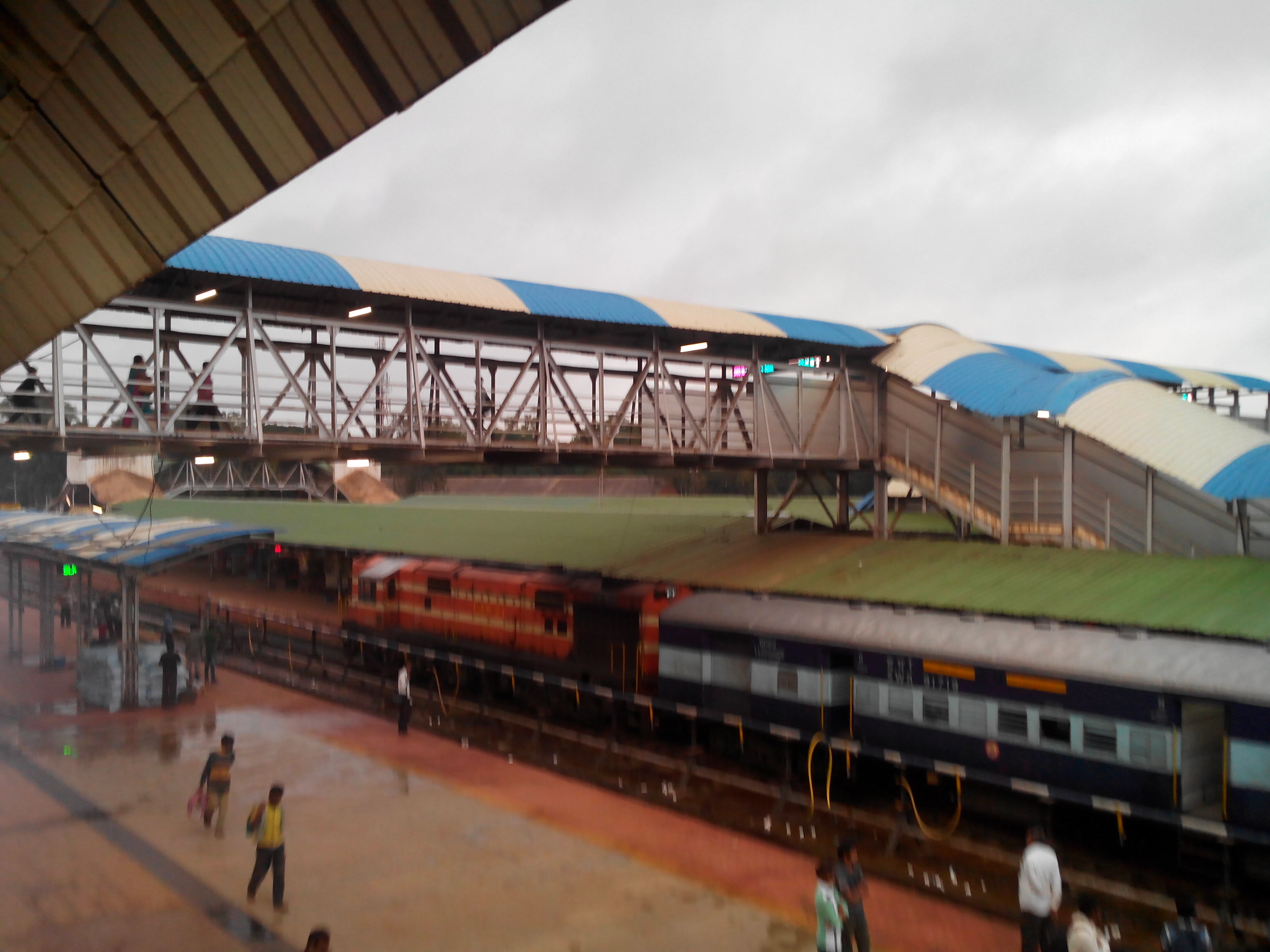
An old picture of Hubli Railway Station

== Lines ==
The Madras and Southern Mahratta Railway opened the 130.02 kilometres (80.79 mi) Hubballi–Harihara rail line on 18 October 1886. And Hubballi–Londa, Hosapet–Hubballi and Chikjajur–Hubballi (part of 469 kilometres (291 mi) Bengaluru–Hubballi) rail lines were converted during 1995.

== Electric & Diesel Loco Shed, Hubballi ==
Serial No.	Locomotive Class	Horsepower	Quantity
1.	WDP-4/4D	4000/4500	31
2.	WDG-4/4D	4000/4500	146
3.	WAP-7	6350	36
4.	WAG-9	6120	143
Total Locomotives Active as of June 2026			356
