= Kudchade railway station =

Railway station in South Goa

Kudchade Railway Station

General information
- Location: Curchorem, South Goa, Goa; India
- Coordinates: 15.2642°N 74.1085°E
- Elevation: 12 metres (39 ft)
- System: Indian Railways station
- Owner: Indian Railways
- Operator: South Western Railway zone
- Line: Guntakal–Vasco da Gama section
- Platforms: 3
- Tracks: 6-7
- Connections: Auto stand

Construction
- Structure type: Standard (on-ground station)
- Parking: No
- Cycle facilities: No

Other information
- Status: Active
- Station code: SVM
- Zone(s): South Western Railway zone
- Division(s): Hubli

Services
Preceding station	Indian Railways	Following station
Chandar towards ?	South Western Railway zone Guntakal–Vasco da Gama section	Kalem towards ?
Location

Kudchade Railway Station (station code: SVM) is a small railway station in South Goa district, Goa. This railway station is also known as Curchorem as well as Sanvordem station. It serves Curchorem town. The station consists of 1 platform. The platform is not well sheltered. It lacks many facilities including water and sanitation. The railway line from Marmagoa to Londa passes through Curchorem.

== History ==
This line was laid in 1880. A Catholic carpenter, Tome Caetano de Costa from aldona, Bardez, was entrusted with laying of the railway line and construction of Curchorem-Sanvordem railway station. One of the main contractors of the rail line from Marmagoa to Collem was Mr. Cosme Damiao Noronha and his subcontractor was Tome Caetano de Costa. Curchorem-Sanvordem was covered with thick forests and wild animals, so that people used to think that Sanvordem formed an outer limit of Goa. The Portuguese government asked the British government to start the railway line. This was the most difficult task as hills had to be cut down, tunnels dug and thick forest cleared.

== Major trains ==
- Vasco da Gama–Kulem Passenger
- Vasco–Chennai Express
- Poorna Express
- Yesvantpur–Vasco da Gama Express
- Vasco da Gama - Yesvantpur Express
- Amaravati Express
- Vasco da Gama–Kacheguda Amaravati Express
- Kacheguda–Vasco da Gama Express
- Tirupati–Vasco da Gama Express
- Hyderabad–Vasco da Gama Express
- Goa Express
- Vasco da Gama - Velankanni Weekly Express
- Vasco da Gama Jasidih Weekly Express
- Kulem- Vasco da Gama Demu Special ↔️
- Vasco da Gama Yesvantpur Express
