= Kulem railway station =

Railway station in Goa, India

Kulem Railway Station

General information
- Location: Kulem, Kushavati district, Goa; India
- Coordinates: 15.3341°N 74.2445°E
- Elevation: 77 metres (253 ft)
- System: Indian Railways station
- Owner: Indian Railways
- Operator: South Western Railway zone
- Line: Guntakal–Vasco da Gama section
- Platforms: 3
- Tracks: 5
- Connections: Auto stand

Construction
- Structure type: Standard (on-ground station)
- Parking: No
- Cycle facilities: No

Other information
- Status: Active
- Station code: QLM
- Zone(s): South Western Railway zone
- Division(s): Hubli

Services
Preceding station	Indian Railways	Following station
Kalem towards ?	South Western Railway zone Guntakal–Vasco da Gama section	Sonalium towards ?
Location
- Location within India Location within Goa

Kulem Railway Station (station code: QLM) is a main railway station in Kushavati district, Goa. It serves Kulem village. The station consists of three platforms. The platforms are not well sheltered. It lacks many facilities including water and sanitation.

Regular shuttle trains run between Vasco. It is the Passenger Train between Vasco and Kulem via Margao and Guntakal stops at Kulem to attach banker locomotives before the train starts journey up the Dudhsagar Falls to reach Castle Rock. The falls are a popular destination.

== Trains ==
- Vasco da Gama–Kulem Passenger
- Vasco–Chennai Express
- Poorna Express
- Yesvantpur–Vasco da Gama Express
- Amaravati Express
- Vasco da Gama–Kacheguda Amaravati Express
- Hubballi–Vasco da Gama Goa Link Express
- Kacheguda–Vasco da Gama Express
- Tirupati–Vasco da Gama Express
- Hyderabad–Vasco da Gama Express
- Goa Express
- Vasco da Gama - Velankanni Weekly Express
- Vasco da Gama Jasidih Weekly Express
- Kulem- Vasco da Gama Demu Special ↔️
- Vasco da Gama Yesvantpur Express
