= Chennai Central–Vasco da Gama Weekly Express =

Train in India

Overview
- Service type: Express
- Current operator: South Western Railway zone

Route
- Termini: Chennai Central (MAS); Vasco da Gama (VSG)
- Stops: 22
- Distance travelled: 1,030 km (640 mi)
- Average journey time: 22h
- Service frequency: Weekly (Note: Runs one day in a week for every direction.)
- Train number: 17311/17312

On-board services
- Classes: AC 2 tier, AC 3 tier, Sleeper class, General Unreserved
- Seating arrangements: No
- Sleeping arrangements: Yes
- Catering facilities: On-board catering E-catering
- Observation facilities: ICF coach
- Entertainment facilities: No
- Baggage facilities: No
- Other facilities: Below the seats

Technical
- Rolling stock: 2
- Track gauge: 1,676 mm (5 ft 6 in)
- Operating speed: 47 km/h (29 mph), including halts
Route map
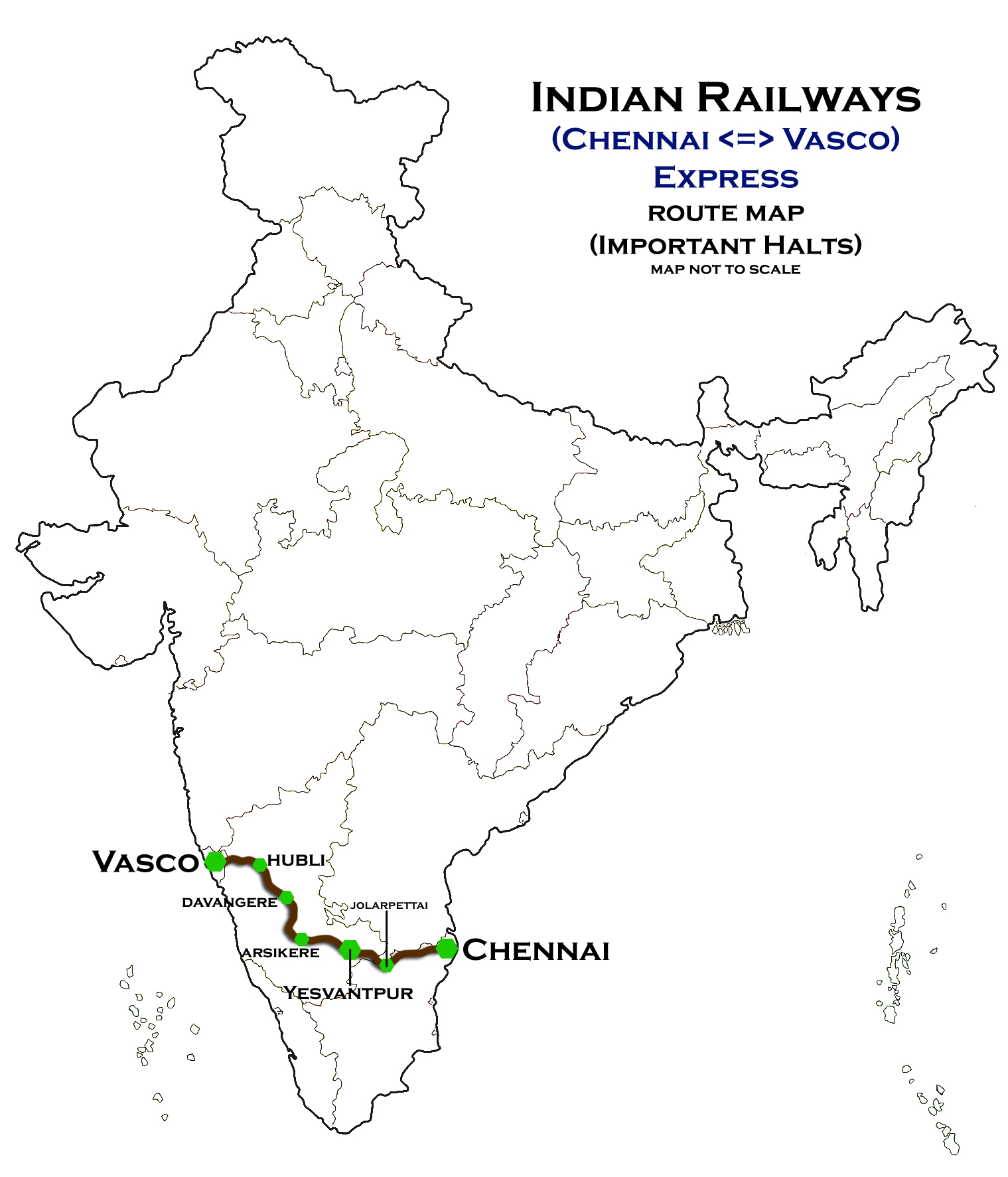

The Chennai Central–Vasco da Gama Weekly Express is an Express train belonging to South Western Railway zone that runs between Chennai Central and Vasco da Gama in India. It is currently being operated with 17311/17312 train numbers on a weekly basis.

== Service ==
The 17311/Chennai Central–Vasco da Gama Weekly Express has an average speed of 47 km/h and covers 1030 km in 22h. The 17312/Vasco da Gama–Chennai Central Weekly Express has an average speed of 48 km/h and covers 1030 km in 21h 25m.

== Route and halts ==
The important halts of the train are:

- Chennai Central
- Arakkonam Junction
- Krishnarajapuram
- Yesvantpur Junction
- Arsikere Junction
- Davangere
- Hubli Junction
- Dharwad
- Londa Junction
- Castle Rock
- Kulem
- Kudchade
- Madgaon Junction
- Vasco da Gama

== Coach composite ==
The train has standard ICF rakes with a maximum speed of 110 km/h. The train consists of 24 coaches :

- 2 AC II Tier
- 3 AC III Tier
- 12 Sleeper coaches
- 1 Pantry car
- 4 General Unreserved
- 2 Seating cum Luggage Rake

== Traction ==
Both trains are hauled by an Erode Loco Shed-based WAP-4 electric locomotive from Chennai to Yesvantpur. From Yesvantpur, train is hauled by a Krishnarajapuram Loco Shed-based WDP-4 diesel locomotive to Vasco da Gama and vice versa.

== Rake sharing ==
The train shares its rake with 17315/17316 Vasco da Gama–Velankanni Weekly Express, 17309/17310 Yesvantpur–Vasco da Gama Express, 12741/12742 Vasco da Gama–Patna Superfast Express.

== Direction reversal ==
Train reverses its direction once:

- Yesvantpur Junction

== See also ==
- Vasco da Gama railway station
- Chennai Central railway station
- Vasco da Gama–Patna Superfast Express
- Vasco da Gama–Velankanni Weekly Express
- Yesvantpur–Vasco da Gama Express
