= Howrah–Vasco da Gama Amaravati Express =

Train in India

Shalimar–Vasco da Gama Amaravati Express
Overview
- Service type: Express
- First service: 9 December 2006; 19 years ago
- Current operator: South Eastern Railway

Route
- Termini: Kolkata Shalimar (SHM); Vasco da Gama (VSG)
- Stops: 40
- Distance travelled: 2,119 km (1,317 mi)
- Average journey time: 40 hrs 30 mins
- Service frequency: Four days a week (Note: Runs four days in a week for every direction.)
- Train number: 18047 / 18048

On-board services
- Classes: AC 2 tier, AC 3 tier, Sleeper Class, General Unreserved
- Seating arrangements: No
- Sleeping arrangements: Yes
- Catering facilities: On-board catering, E-catering
- Observation facilities: Large windows
- Baggage facilities: No
- Other facilities: Below the seats

Technical
- Rolling stock: LHB coach
- Track gauge: 1,676 mm (5 ft 6 in)
- Operating speed: 52 km/h (32 mph) average including halts.

The 18047 / 18048 Shalimar–Vasco da Gama Amaravati Express is an Express train belonging to South Eastern Railway zone that runs between Shalimar railway station and Vasco da Gama in India. It is currently being operated with 18047/18048 train numbers on four days in week basis.

== Introduction ==
The train is named after the famous capital city of the Satavahana dynasty, Amaravati, which stands in the present-day Guntur district.

It is the only train connecting the states of West Bengal and Goa directly, and between Kolkata and Goa.The train is highly preferred by tourists and nature lovers, because it runs through the coastal Goa, the Deccan Plateau, coastal Andhra, and Orissa, and the spectacular Braganza Ghats of the Western Ghats, where it meets the world-famous Dudhsagar Falls.

The 18047/Amaravati Express has an average speed of 52 km/h and covers 2119 km in 40h 30m. The 18048/Amaravati Express has an average speed of 52 km/h and covers 2119 km in 41h 05m.

== Timings ==
The 18047/Amaravati Express departs from Shalimar railway station at 23:15 IST (Monday, Tuesday, Thursday, Saturday) and arrives Vasco da Gama at 15:45 IST (Monday, Wednesday, Thursday, Saturday).

The 18048/Amaravati Express departs from Vasco da Gama at 6:30 IST (Sunday, Tuesday, Thursday, Friday) and arrives Shalimar railway station at 23:35 IST (Monday, Wednesday, Friday, Saturday).

== Halts ==
The en route halts of the train are:

WEST BENGAL

1. Shalimar railway station (Source Station)
2. Santragachi Junction
3. Kharagpur Junction

ODISHA

1. Balasore
2. Bhadrak
3. Jajpur Keonjhar Road
4. Cuttack Junction
5. Bhubaneswar
6. Khurda Road Junction
7. Brahmapur

ANDHRA PRADESH

1. Palasa
2. Srikakulam Road
3. Vizianagaram Junction
4. Visakhapatnam Junction
5. Duvvada
6. Samalkot Junction
7. Rajahmundry
8. Tadepalligudem
9. Eluru
10. Vijayawada Junction
11. Guntur Junction
12. Narasaraopet
13. Vinukonda
14. Markapur Road
15. Cumbum
16. Giddalur
17. Nandyal
18. Dhone Junction
19. Guntakal Junction

KARNATAKA

1. Ballari Junction
2. Toranagallu
3. Hosapete Junction
4. Koppal
5. Gadag Junction
6. Hubli Junction
7. Dharwad
8. Londa Junction
9. Castle Rock

GOA

1. Kulem
2. Sanvordem
3. Madgaon Junction
4. Vasco da Gama (Destination Station)

== Available classes ==
The train has LHB rakes with a maximum speed of 130 km/h. The train consists of 21 LHB coaches:

- 1 AC II Tier
- 4 AC III Tier
- 9 Sleeper coaches
- 4 General Unreserved
- 1 Seating cum Luggage Rake
- 1 Generator Car cum Luggage Rake
- 1 Parcel Van.

== Traction ==
The train is hauled by a Santragachi-based WAP-7 electric locomotive from Howrah to Visakhapatnam Junction.

From Visakhapatnam Junction, it is hauled by Vijayawada-based WAP-7 electric locomotive up to Guntakal Junction.

From Guntakal Junction, train is hauled by Gooty-based WDP-4 twin/WDP-4B twin diesel locomotive up to Vasco da Gama and vice versa.

For the Braganza Ghats, the 1:37 gradient requires the use of Bank engine on the way to Kulem to Castle Rock. The 18048/Amaravati Express gets Hubballi Junction based WDG-4s as bankers.

== Direction reversal ==
Train reverses its direction 1 time:

- Visakhapatnam Junction

== See also ==
- Howrah Junction railway station
- Vasco da Gama railway station
- Amaravati Express
