= Castle Rock railway station, Karnataka =

Railway station in Karnataka, India

Castle Rock railway station

General information
- Location: Railway Station Road, Castle Rock, Karnataka; India
- Coordinates: 15.3986°N 74.3337°E
- Elevation: 585 metres (1,919 ft)
- System: Indian Railways station
- Owner: Indian Railways
- Operator: Hubli railway division
- Platforms: 3
- Tracks: 6
- Connections: Auto stand

Construction
- Structure type: Standard (on-ground station)
- Parking: No
- Cycle facilities: No

Other information
- Status: Operational
- Station code: CLR
- Fare zone: South Western Railway
Location

Castle Rock railway station (Station code: CLR) is a small railway station in Uttara Kannada, Karnataka. It serves Castle Rock city. The station consists of two platforms. The platforms are not well sheltered and it lacks many facilities including water and sanitation.

The station was built by West of India Portuguese Railway and was connected with the line from Londa. The terminus of the line today is Vasco da Gama railway station.

== Major trains ==
- Amaravati Express
- Yesvantpur–Vasco da Gama Express
- Vasco da Gama–Velankanni Weekly Express
- Vasco–Chennai Express
- Goa Express
- Poorna Express (via Belagavi)
- Miraj–Castle Rock Express
- Tirupati - Vasco da Gama Express (17419)
- Jasidh - Vasco da Gama Express (17322)
