= Chandar railway station =

Railway station in Goa, India

Chandar Railway Station

General information
- Location: Cotta Chandor Salcete, South Goa, Goa; India
- Coordinates: 15.2648°N 74.0479°E
- Elevation: 6 metres (20 ft)
- System: Indian Railways station
- Owner: Indian Railways
- Operator: South Western Railway zone
- Line: Guntakal–Vasco da Gama section
- Platforms: 1
- Tracks: 2
- Connections: Auto stand

Construction
- Structure type: Standard (on-ground station)
- Parking: No
- Cycle facilities: No

Other information
- Status: Construction – Diesel-Line Doubling
- Station code: CNR
- Zone(s): South Western Railway zone
- Division(s): Hubli

Services
Preceding station	Indian Railways	Following station
Sanjuje Da Arey towards ?	South Western Railway zone Guntakal–Vasco da Gama section	Kudchade towards ?
Location

Chandar Railway Station (station code: CNR) is a small railway station in South Goa district, Goa. It serves Chandar village. The station consists of one platform. The platform is not well sheltered. It lacks many facilities including water and sanitation.

== Major trains ==
- Vasco da Gama–Kulem Passenger
