= Vasco da Gama–Patna Superfast Express =

Train in India

Overview
- Service type: Superfast
- First service: 24 December 2008; 17 years ago
- Current operator: South Western Railway

Route
- Termini: Vasco da Gama (VSG); Patna Junction (PNBE)
- Stops: 16
- Distance travelled: 2,229 km (1,385 mi)
- Average journey time: 39 hrs 05 mins
- Service frequency: Weekly (Note: Runs one day in a week for every direction.)
- Train number: 12741 / 12742

On-board services
- Classes: AC 2 tier, AC 3 tier, Sleeper Class, General Unreserved
- Seating arrangements: No
- Sleeping arrangements: Yes
- Catering facilities: On-board catering, E-catering
- Observation facilities: Large windows
- Baggage facilities: No
- Other facilities: Below the seats

Technical
- Rolling stock: LHB coach
- Track gauge: 1,676 mm (5 ft 6 in)
- Operating speed: 57 km/h (35 mph) average including halts.

The 12741 / 12742 Vasco da Gama–Patna Superfast Express is a Superfast train belonging to South Western Railway zone that runs between Vasco da Gama and Patna Junction in India. It is currently being operated with 12741/12742 train numbers on a weekly basis.

== Service ==
The 12741/Vasco da Gama–Patna SF Express has an average speed of 57 km/h and covers 2229 km in 39h 05m. The 12742/Patna–Vasco da Gama SF Express has an average speed of 58 km/h and covers 2229 km in 38h 15m.

== Route and halts ==
The important halts of the train are:

- Vasco da Gama
- Madgaon Junction
- Thivim
- Sawantwadi Road
- Ratnagiri
- Chiplun
- Panvel
- Kalyan Junction
- Nasik Road
- Manmad Junction
- Bhusaval Junction
- Khandwa Junction
- Itarsi Junction
- Jabalpur Junction
- Katni Junction
- Satna Junction
- Prayagraj Chheoki Junction
- Mughalsarai Junction
- Buxar
- Ara Junction
- Patna Junction

== Coach composite ==
The train has modern LHB rake with a maximum speed of 130 km/h. The train consists of 21 coaches:

- 2 AC II Tier
- 2 AC III Tier
- 10 Sleeper coaches
- 1 Parcel Van
- 4 General Unreserved
- 1 SLR (Seating cum Luggage Rake)
- 1 EOG (End on Generator car)

== Schedule ==
Train number	Station code	Departure station	Departure time	Departure day	Arrival station	Arrival time	Arrival day
12741	VSG	Vasco da Gama (Goa)	7:05 PM	Wednesday	Patna (Bihar)	10:10 AM	Friday
12742	PNBE	Patna (Bihar)	2:05 PM	Saturday	Vasco da Gama (Goa)	4:20 AM	Monday

== Traction ==
- Vasco Da Gama (VSG) to Madgaon (MAO) and vice-versa - Gooty Loco Shed based WDG-4 diesel locomotive.
- Madgaon (MAO) to Patna (PNBE) and vice-versa - Samastipur Loco Shed based WAP-7 electric locomotive.

== Rake sharing ==
The train has its dedicated single LHB rake with Primary Maintenance at Vasco Da Gama (VSG) coaching depot.

== Direction reversal ==
Train reverses its direction once:

- Madgaon Junction

== Accident ==
On 24 November 2017, train number 12741 was derailed near platform number two of Manikpur railway station in Chitrakoot division, Uttar Pradesh. The train was derailed at 4:18 am (IST), with three people getting killed and at least nine injured. One coach of the train was half tilted in the incident. Seven injured were referred to the Manikpur CHC hospital while two were sent to the district hospital in Chitrakoot. According to ADG (Law and Order), Anand Kumar, "prima facie it appears that fractured railway track is the cause of accident as per local assessment".

== See also ==
- Vasco da Gama railway station
- Patna Junction railway station
- Yesvantpur–Vasco da Gama Express
- Vasco da Gama–Velankanni Weekly Express
- Chennai Central–Vasco da Gama Weekly Express
