= Tirupati–Vasco da Gama Express =

Overview
- Service type: Express train
- Status: Operating
- Locale: Andhra Pradesh, Karnataka & Goa
- First service: 29 December 2016; 9 years ago
- Current operator: South Coast Railway zone

Route
- Termini: Tirupati (TPTY); Vasco da Gama (VSG)
- Stops: 24
- Distance travelled: 776 km (482 mi)
- Average journey time: 18 hours
- Service frequency: Weekly
- Train number: 17419 / 17420

On-board services
- Classes: 2A, 3A, SL, SLR and UR / GS
- Disabled access: Disabled access
- Seating arrangements: Corridor coach (unreserved)
- Sleeping arrangements: Couchette car (reserved)
- Auto-rack arrangements: No
- Catering facilities: No
- Observation facilities: Windows in all carriages
- Entertainment facilities: No
- Baggage facilities: Overhead racks Baggage carriage

Technical
- Rolling stock: Bogie: One AC 2-Tier (A1); One AC 3-Tier (B1); Three II SL; Three UR / GS; Two SLR
- Track gauge: 1,676 mm (5 ft 6 in)
- Electrification: 25 kV AC, 50 Hz
- Operating speed: 42 kilometres per hour (26 mph)
- Track owner: South Central Railway zone
Route map
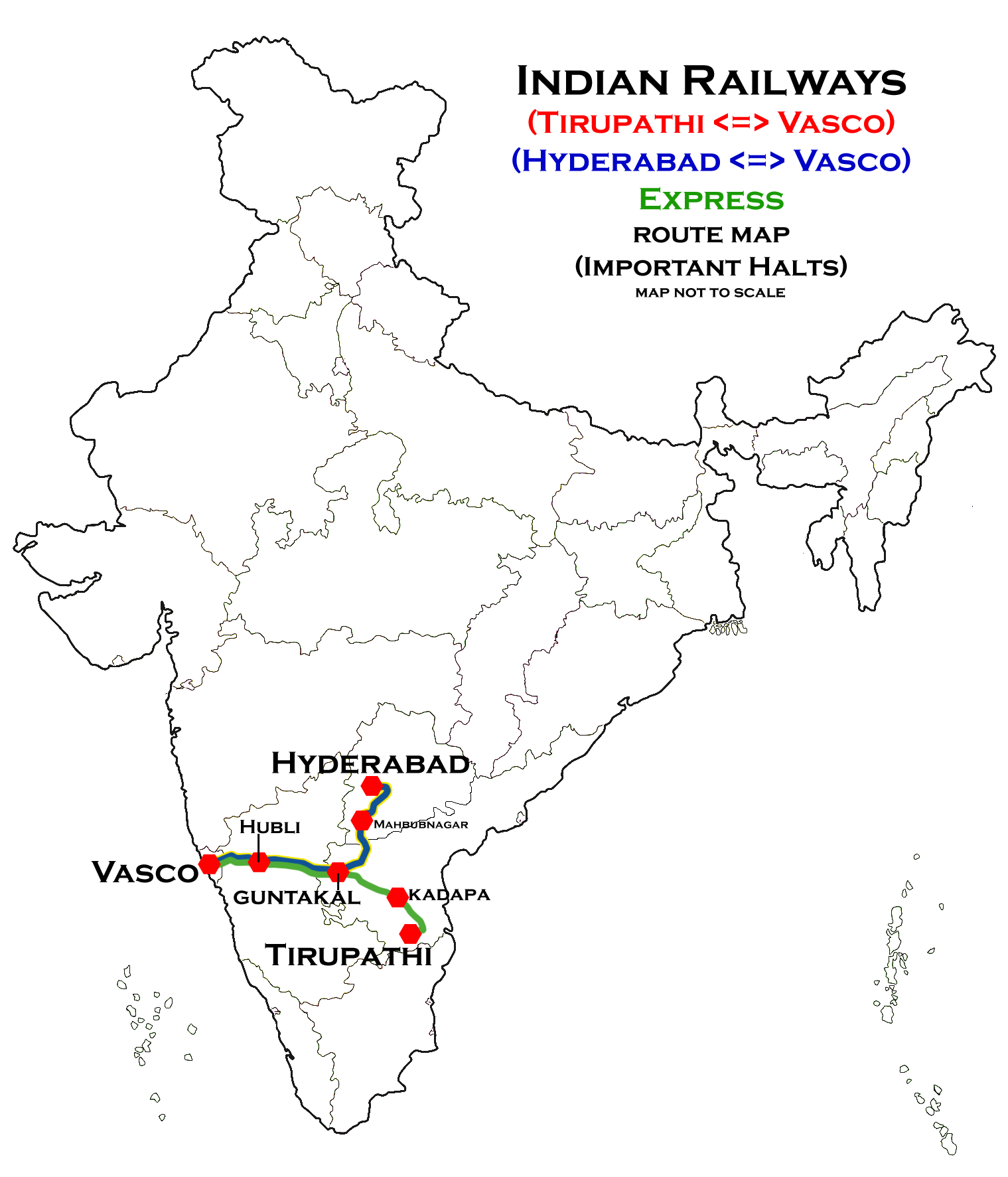

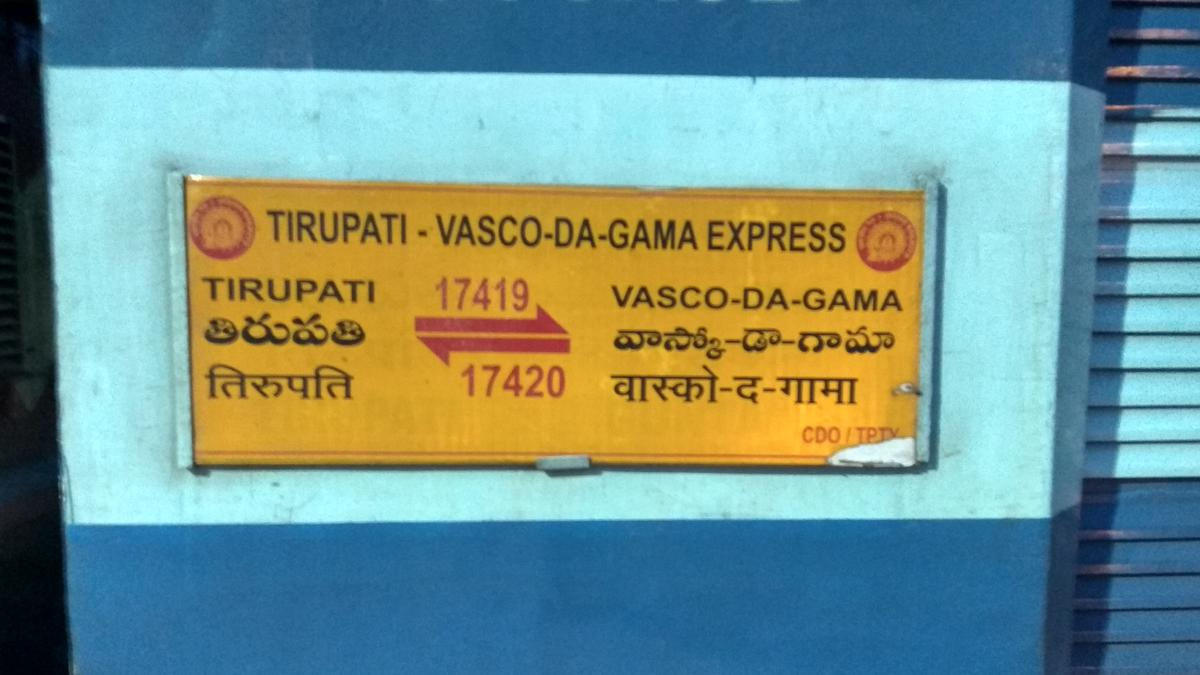
Train standing our side the platform

Tirupati–Vasco da Gama Express is an Express train service connecting Tirupati in Andhra Pradesh, India with Vasco da Gama, Goa, India.

== Overview ==
This train had its inaugural run on 29 December 2016 and regular run commenced from 5 January 2017.

== Rakes ==
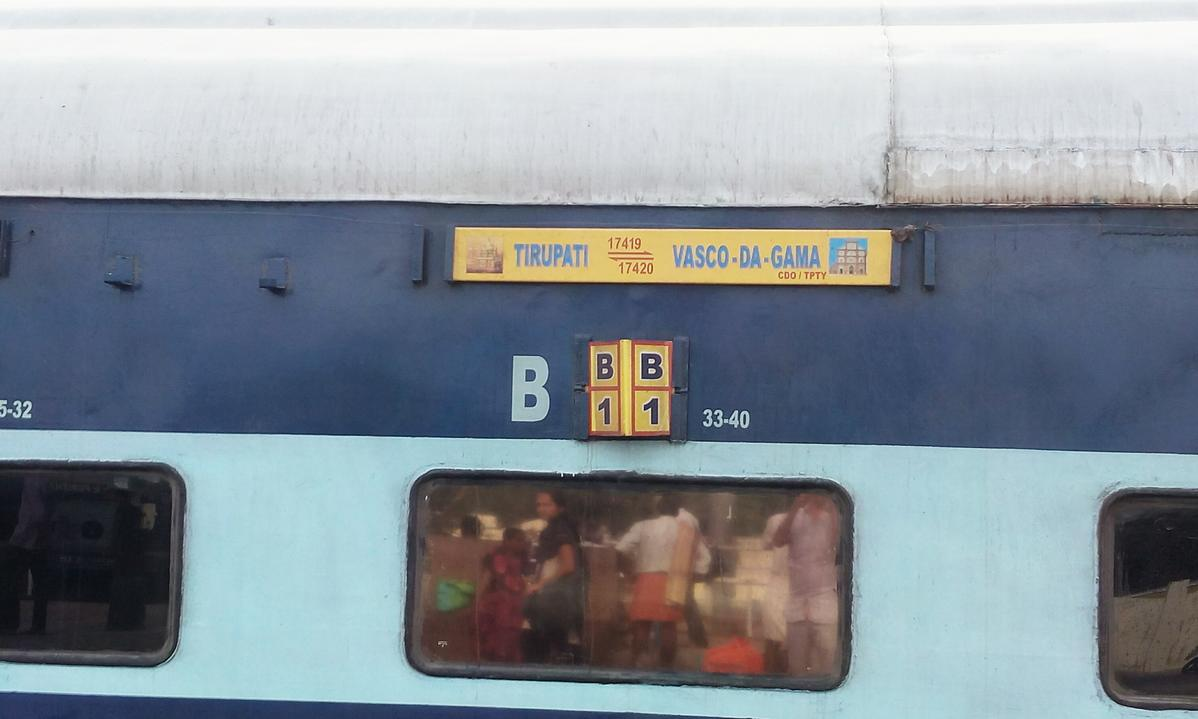
B1 coach of TPTY-VSG train

The train has 10 coaches comprising one AC 2-Tier (A1), one AC 3-Tier (B1), three Second Class Sleepers (SL), three General compartments (unreserved) and two Luggage rakes. (Note: The coach composition is subject to change.)

Loco	1	2	3	4	5	6	7	8	9	10
	SLR	GS	A1	B1	S1	S2	S3	GS	GS	SLR

== Routeing ==
The 17419 / 20 Tirupati–Vasco da Gama Express runs from Tirupati via Kadapa, Gooty, Guntakal Junction, Ballari Junction, Hospet Junction, Gadag Junction railway station, Hubballi Junction, Londa Junction, Castle Rock, Sanverdam, Madgoan.

== See also ==
- Hyderabad–Vasco da Gama Express
- Vasco da Gama–Velankanni Weekly Express
