= Yesvantpur–Vasco da Gama Express =

Train in India

Overview
- Service type: Express
- First service: 1 July 2001; 25 years ago
- Current operator: South Western Railway

Route
- Termini: Yesvantpur Junction (YPR); Vasco da Gama (VSG)
- Stops: 18
- Distance travelled: 664 km (413 mi)
- Average journey time: 13hrs 40mins
- Service frequency: Daily (Note: Runs one day in a week for every direction.)
- Train number: 17309 / 17310

On-board services
- Classes: AC 2 tier, AC 3 tier, Sleeper Class, General Unreserved
- Seating arrangements: Yes
- Sleeping arrangements: Yes
- Catering facilities: On-board catering, E-catering
- Observation facilities: Large windows
- Baggage facilities: No
- Other facilities: Below the seats

Technical
- Rolling stock: LHB coach
- Track gauge: 1,676 mm (5 ft 6 in)
- Operating speed: 49 km/h (30 mph) average including halts

The 17309 / 17310 Yesvantpur–Vasco da Gama Express is an Express train belonging to South Western Railway zone that runs between Yesvantpur Junction and Vasco da Gama in India. It is currently being operated with 17309/17310 train numbers on Daily basis.

== Service ==
The 17309/Yesvantpur–Vasco da Gama Express has an average speed of 47 km/h and covers 664 km in 14hr 15m. The 17310/Vasco da Gama–Yesvantpur Express has an average speed of 49 km/h and covers 664 km in 13hr 40m. If you know that from Bangalore via Yesvantpur Junction to Goa only 5 (rail) trains were survival between these two cities.

== Schedule ==
Train number	Station code	Departure station	Departure time	Departure day	Arrival station	Arrival time	Arrival day
17309	YPR	Yesvantpur (Bangalore)	3:00 PM	Daily	Vasco (Goa)	5:15 AM	Daily
17310	VSG	Vasco (Goa)	10:55PM	Daily	Yesvantpur (Bangalore)	12:35 PM	Daily

== Route and halts ==
The important halts of the train are:

- Yesvantpur Junction
- Tumkur
- Tiptur
- Arsikere Junction
- Kadur Junction
- Chikajajur Junction
- Birur Junction
- Davangere
- Harihara
- Ranibennur
- SSM Haveri
- SSS Hubballi Junction
- Dharwad
- Alnavar Junction
- Londa Junction
- Castle Rock
- Kulem
- Kudchade
- Madgaon Junction
- Vasco da Gama

== Coach composite ==
The train has two dedicated LHB rakes of 20 coaches each :

- 1 AC II Tier
- 3 AC III Tier
- 10 Sleeper coaches
- 4 General Unreserved
- 1 Seating cum Luggage Rake
- 1 Generator Car cum Luggage Rake.

== Traction ==
The train is hauled by a Krishnarajapuram Loco Shed-based WDP-4D diesel locomotive from Yesvantpur to Vasco da Gama and vice versa.

== Rake sharing ==
The train is having two dedicated rakes of its own.

== See also ==
- Vasco da Gama railway station
- Yesvantpur Junction railway station
- Vasco da Gama–Patna Superfast Express
- Vasco da Gama–Velankanni Weekly Express
- Chennai Central–Vasco da Gama Weekly Express
