= Southern Mahratta Railway =

Southern Mahratta Railway (SMR) was a railway company in British India founded in 1882.

== History ==
Captain Charles Cooper Johnson, officiating as constructing engineer of railways in 1858, forwarded the proposal for a railway to be constructed and called it the Southern Mahratta Railway. The Southern Mahratta Railway company was formed on 1 June 1882 with its headquarters at Dharwar. Southern Mahratta Railway's first line was a metre gauge line of 40.5 mile long from Bellary to Hospet. This line was opened for traffic on 24 March 1884. In 1886 the Mysore State Railway's management was also taken by the Southern Mahratta Railway company. In 1888, a line was extended from Londa towards Portuguese Goa where it connected with the Marmagao line at Castle Rock. In 1889-90 the Southern Mahratta Railway company constructed the first coast to coast line from Marmagoa to Beswada. The Londa - Castle Rock line was later taken over by West of India Portuguese Railway. SMR was later merged with Madras Railway to form the Madras and Southern Mahratta Railway. The merger took place on 1 January 1908.

== Conversion to broad gauge ==
The railway lines were converted to 1,676 mm (5 ft 6 in) broad gauge in 1997.
