= Londa Junction railway station =

Railway station in Karnataka, India

Londa Junction

General information
- Location: Londa, Belagavi district, Karnataka
- Coordinates: 15.4489°N 74.4960°E
- Elevation: 643 m (2,110 ft)
- System: Indian Railways station
- Owner: Indian Railways
- Lines: Guntakal–Vasco da Gama section Londa–Pune line

Construction
- Parking: available

Other information
- Status: Functional
- Station code: LD
- Fare zone: South Western Railway zone
Location
- Location within India Location within Karnataka

Londa Junction railway station (station code: LD) is the primary railway station serving Manjarpai, Londa in Belagavi district of northern Karnataka. The station falls under the jurisdiction of Hubli division of South Western Railways. The station has three platforms. The station is situated on the Miraj - Belgaum - Hubballi line with a branch line towards Vasco Da Gama, Goa.

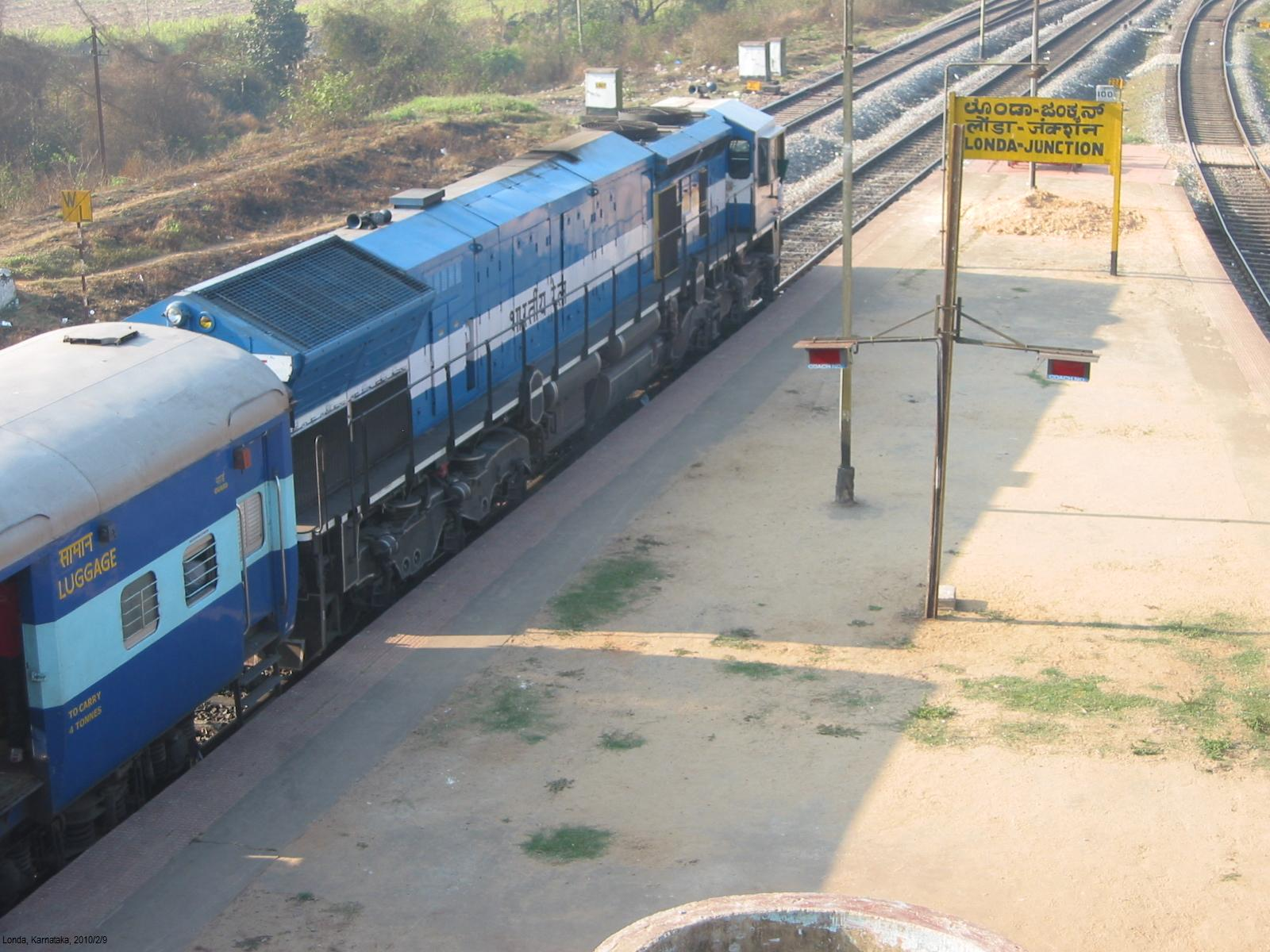
A train from Bangalore leaving Londa Junction railway station after a stop

== Originating Trains ==
- Miraj - Londa Passenger
- Miraj - Castlerock Express
- Amaravati Express
- Yesvantpur–Vasco da Gama Express
- Vasco da Gama - Yesvantpur Express
- Vasco da Gama–Velankanni Weekly Express
- Vasco–Chennai Express
- Goa Express
- Poorna Express (via Belagavi)
- Miraj–Castle Rock Express

== See also ==
- Konkan Railway Corporation Limited
