= Hyderabad–Vasco da Gama Express =

Train in India

Overview
- Service type: Express train
- Locale: Telangana, Andhra Pradesh, Karnataka & Goa
- First service: 29 December 2016; 9 years ago
- Current operator: South Central Railway

Route
- Termini: Hyderabad Deccan (HYB); Vasco da Gama (VSG)
- Stops: 23
- Distance travelled: 823 km (511 mi)
- Average journey time: 20 Hrs 30 mins
- Service frequency: Weekly
- Train number: 17021 / 17022

On-board services
- Classes: AC 2 Tier, AC 3 Tier, Sleeper Class, General Unreserved
- Disabled access: Disabled access
- Seating arrangements: Yes
- Sleeping arrangements: Yes
- Catering facilities: No
- Observation facilities: Large windows
- Baggage facilities: Available
- Other facilities: Below the seats

Technical
- Rolling stock: ICF coach
- Track gauge: 1,676 mm (5 ft 6 in)
- Operating speed: 41 km/h (25 mph) average including halts.
Route map
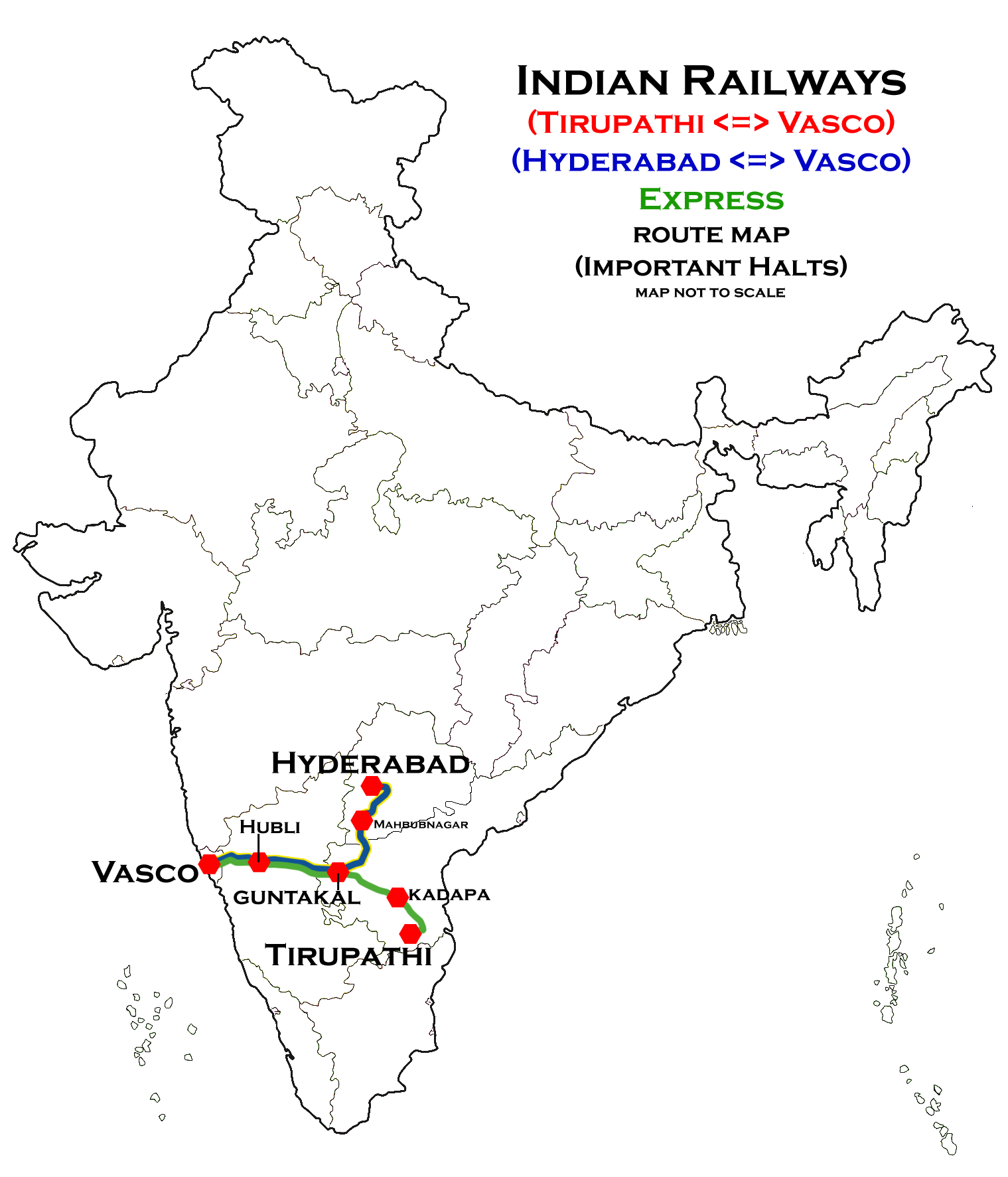

The 17021 / 17022 Hyderabad–Vasco da Gama Express is an express train service connecting Hyderabad in Telangana and Vasco da Gama, Goa India.

== Overview ==
This train had its inaugural run on 29 December 2016 and regular run commenced from 5 January 2017.

== Rakes ==
The train has 10 coaches comprising one AC 2-tier (A1), one AC 3-tier (BV1), three Second Class sleepers (SV), three general compartments (unreserved) and two luggage rakes. (Note: The coach composition is subject to change.)

Loco	1	2	3	4	5	6	7	8	9	10
	SLR	GS	A1	BV1	SV1	SV2	SV3	GS	GS	SLR

== Routeing ==
The 17021 / 22 Hyderabad–Vasco da Gama Express runs from Hyderabad via Mahbubnagar railway station, Kurnool City railway station, Dhone Junction railway station, Guntakal Junction, Ballari Junction railway station, Hospet Junction, Gadag Junction railway station, Hubballi Junction, Londa Junction, and Castle Rock, Sanverdam, Madgoan.

== See also ==
- Tirupati–Vasco da Gama Express
- Vasco Velankanni Express
