= Ballari Junction railway station =

Railway station in Karnataka, India

Ballari Junction Bellary Junction
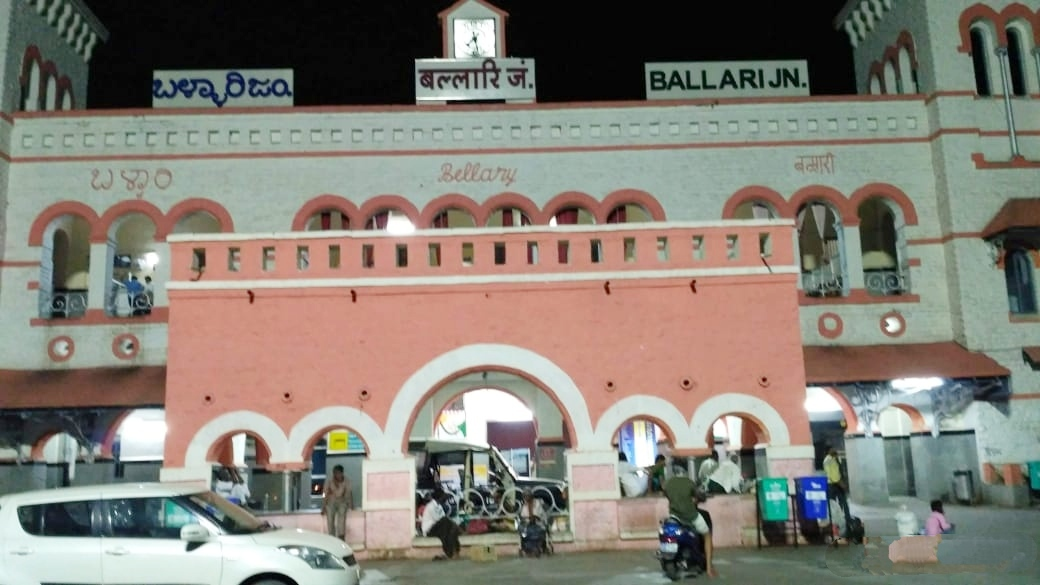

General information
- Location: National Highway 150A, Ballari, Karnataka; India
- Coordinates: 15.1455°N 76.9235°E
- Elevation: 387 metres (1,270 ft)
- System: Indian Railways station
- Owner: Indian Railways
- Operator: South Western Railway
- Lines: Guntakal–Vasco da Gama section, Ballari–Chikjajur line
- Platforms: 4
- Tracks: 6
- Connections: Auto stand, City Bus Stand

Construction
- Structure type: Standard (on-ground station)
- Parking: Yes
- Cycle facilities: Yes

Other information
- Status: Functioning
- Station code: BAY
- Zone(s): South Western Railway
- Division(s): Hubli

History
- Opened: 1896, 151 years ago
Location

Ballari Junction railway station, formerly Bellary Junction railway station (station code: BAY) is a main railway station in Ballari district, Karnataka. It serves Ballari. This is one of the oldest railway stations in India, and possibly the second in karnataka, built by the British Raj more than 150 years ago. The foundation stone for Ballari Junction was laid in 1869. Mahatma Gandhi visited Ballari and spent about eight hours at the railway station here on 1 October 1921.

Previously, the Ballari was part of Southern Mahratta Railway on Hubballi–Guntakal rail line. station consists of four platforms for its junction for three routes going towards Rayadurgam, Guntakal and Hosapete.

== Major trains ==
Some of the important trains that run via Ballari Junction are:

- Amaravati Express
- Hampi Express
- Kacheguda–Hubballi Prasanti Nilayam Express
- Hubballi–Chennai express (via Bellary)
- Hyderabad–CSMT Kolhapur Express
- Mysuru–Sainagar Shirdi Weekly Express
- Secunderabad–Vasco Da Gama Express
- Ajmer–KSR Bengaluru Garib Nawaz Express
- Haripriya Express
- Bhagat Ki Kothi– KSR Bengaluru Express (Via Ballari)
- Hubballi–Vijayawada Express
- Tirupati–Hubballi Intercity Passenger
- KSR Bengaluru–Hosapete Passenger
- Ballari–Dharwad Passenger
- Yesvantpur-Nizamuddin Sampark Kranti Express
