= Poorna Express =

Train in India

Overview
- Service type: Express
- Locale: Maharashtra, Goa, Karnataka & Kerala
- First service: 25 February 1997; 29 years ago
- Current operator: Central Railway

Route
- Termini: Pune (PUNE); Ernakulam (ERS)
- Stops: 32
- Distance travelled: 1,285 km (798 mi)
- Average journey time: 29 hours 00 minutes
- Service frequency: Weekly
- Train number: 11097 / 11098

On-board services
- Classes: AC 2 Tier, AC 3 Tier, Sleeper Class, General Unreserved
- Seating arrangements: Yes
- Sleeping arrangements: Yes
- Catering facilities: Available
- Observation facilities: Large windows
- Baggage facilities: Available
- Other facilities: Below the seats

Technical
- Rolling stock: LHB coach
- Track gauge: 1,676 mm (5 ft 6 in)
- Operating speed: 44 km/h (27 mph) average including halts.
Route map
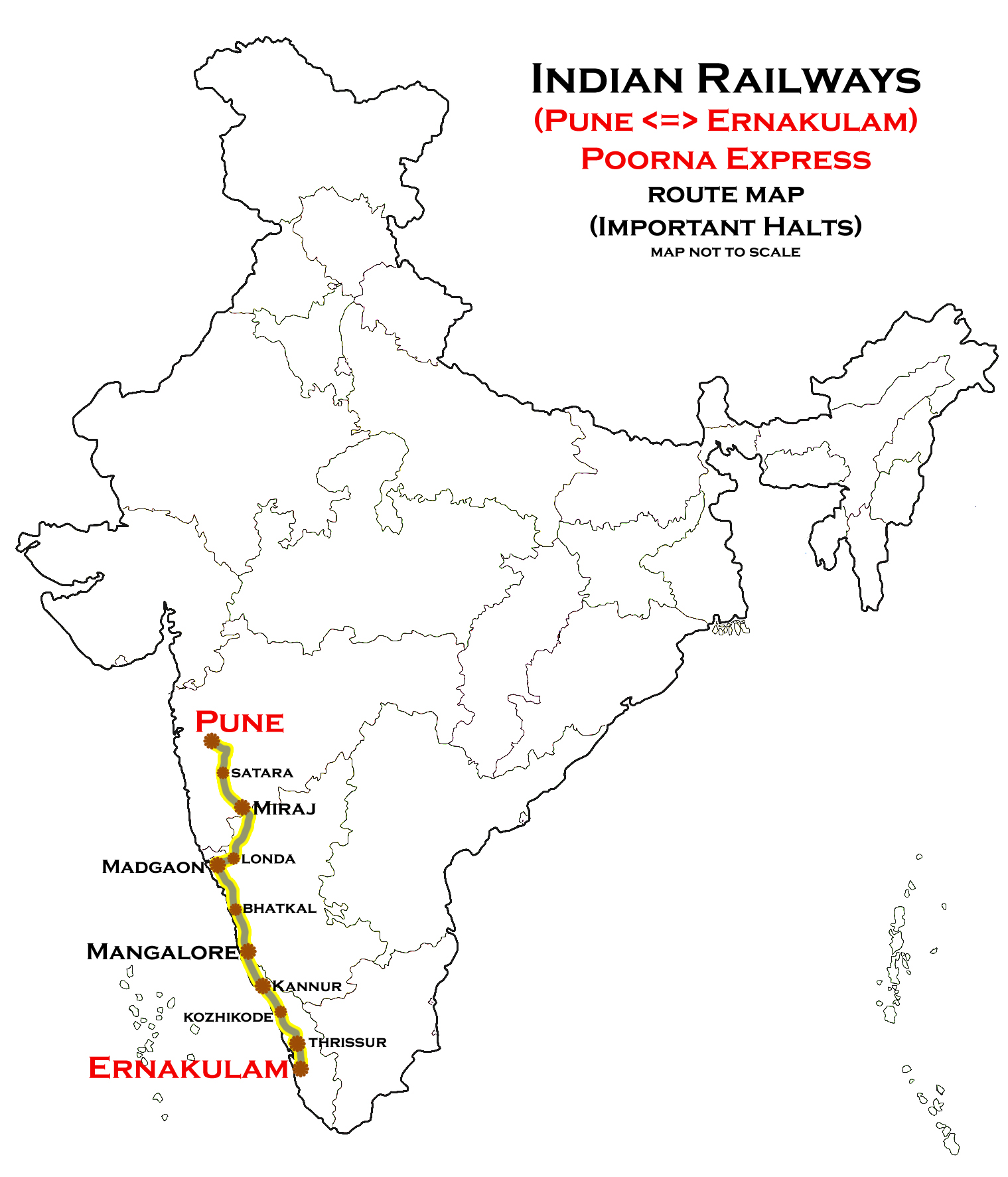
- Poorna Express (Pune–Ernakulam) route map

The 11097 / 11098 Poorna Express is an express train running between Ernakulam Junction to Pune Junction.

The Poorna Express runs only on Mondays starting from Ernakulum Junction at 23:30 am and ends at Pune Junction at 4:30 am 2 days later covering a total distance of 1,285 km (798 mi) and crossing a total of 35 stations.

From Pune is runs only on Saturday starting at 23:30 pm arriving Ernakulam at 04.30 am 2 days later. Demands of extending this train to Thiruvananthapuram with a revised & better timetable have been going on since 2019. In 2021, Mangaluru Railway Passengers Front demanded a duplicate Poorna Express on Pune-Cochin route following the route of erstwhile Pune-Cochin MG/BG Express.

== History ==
Before 1997, in the Meter Gauge era, there was a Train from Pune to Cochin which used to run in Meter Gauge from Pune to Mangaluru via Satara, Miraj, Belagavi, Londa, Hubballi, Davanagere, Chikkajajur, Birur, Arsikere, Hassan, Sakleshpura, Subhramaniya Road. Then in Broad Gauge between Mangaluru & Cochin. Then in 1997, Poorna Express was started in BG via Hubballi, Krishnarajapuram, Salem, Erode, Coimbatore line. Poorna Express used to cover 1,674 km (1,040 mi) in 31 hrs 35 mins running at 53 km/h (33 mph) speed. In 1999, Poorna Express was permanently shifted to Konkan Railway & was given a bizarre timetable, very bad but still running with it.

In June 2022, the train was diverted through a temporary route due to doubling up work.

== Coach Rakes ==
The ICF coach rakes were replaced by Linke Hofmann Busch (LHB) coaches from July 2025.

== Route and halts ==
The following is a detailed stoppages for the train currently

No.	Station name	Distance covered
1	Ernakulam Jn (ERS)	0 km (0 mi)
2	Aluva (AWY)	20 km (12 mi)
3	Thrissur (TCR)	75 km (47 mi)
4	Shoranur Jn (SRR)	108 km (67 mi)
5	Tirur (TIR)	153 km (95 mi)
6	Kozhikode (CLT)	196 km (122 mi)
7	Thalassery (TLY)	263 km (163 mi)
8	Kannur (CAN)	285 km (177 mi)
9	Payyanur (PAY)	319 km (198 mi)
10	Kanhangad (KZE)	345 km (214 mi)
11	Kasaragod (KGQ)	368 km (229 mi)
12	Mangalore Jn (MAJN)	416 km (258 mi)
13	Udupi (UD)	478 km (297 mi)
14	Kundapura (KUDA)	529 km (329 mi)
15	Bhatkal (BTJL)	548 km (341 mi)
16	Murdeshwar (MRDW)	576 km (358 mi)
17	Honnavar (HNA)	600 km (373 mi)
18	Kumta (KT)	625 km (388 mi)
19	Gokarna Road (GOK)	652 km (405 mi)
20	Karwar (KAWR)	671 km (417 mi)
21	Madgaon (MAO)	731 km (454 mi)
22	Curchorem (SVM)	748 km (465 mi)
23	Kulem (QLM)	763 km (474 mi)
24	Castle Rock (CLR)	790 km (491 mi)
25	Londa Junction (LD)	815 km (506 mi)
26	Belgaum (BGM)	867 km (539 mi)
27	Ghatprabha (GPB)	925 km (575 mi)
28	Miraj Junction (MRJ)	1,005 km (624 mi)
29	Sangli (SLI)	1,013 km (629 mi)
30	Karad (KRD)	1,078 km (670 mi)
31	Satara (STR)	1,138 km (707 mi)
32	Pune Jn (PUNE)	1,285 km (798 mi)

== Traction ==
The train is hauled by a Pune Loco Shed-based WDP-4D diesel locomotive from Pune to Ernakulam and vice versa.

== Direction reversal ==
The train reverses its direction at Madgaon Junction & Londa Junction

== Rake sharing ==
The train shares its rake with 22149/22150 Pune–Ernakulam Express.
