= Marmagao railway station =

Railway station in South Goa

Marmagao Railway Station

General information
- Location: Marmagao, Goa; India
- Coordinates: 15.4089°N 73.7992°E
- Elevation: 7 metres (23 ft)
- System: Indian Railways station
- Owner: Indian Railways
- Operator: South Western Railway zone
- Line: Guntakal–Vasco da Gama section
- Platforms: 2
- Tracks: 4
- Connections: Auto stand

Construction
- Structure type: Standard (on-ground station)
- Parking: No
- Cycle facilities: No

Other information
- Status: Double electric line
- Station code: MRH
- Zone(s): South Western Railway zone
- Division(s): Hubli

History
- Electrified: Ongoing

Services
Preceding station	Indian Railways	Following station
Terminus	South Western Railway zone Guntakal–Vasco da Gama section	Vasco da Gama towards ?
Location

Marmagao Railway Station (Station code: MRH) is a small railway station in South Goa district, Goa. It serves Marmagao city. The station consists of two platforms, which are not well sheltered and lack many facilities, including water and sanitation.

The station was part of the Marmagao and Vasco metre-gauge railway line, which was the main rail line in the state until Konkan Railway was started in 1998. It comes under the jurisdiction of the Hubli division of the South Western Railway zone. There are no trains from the station, as Vasco da Gama railway station serves the purpose and is just 2 kilometres (1.2 mi) from Marmagao station.
