= Guntakal–Vasco da Gama section =

Railway line in India

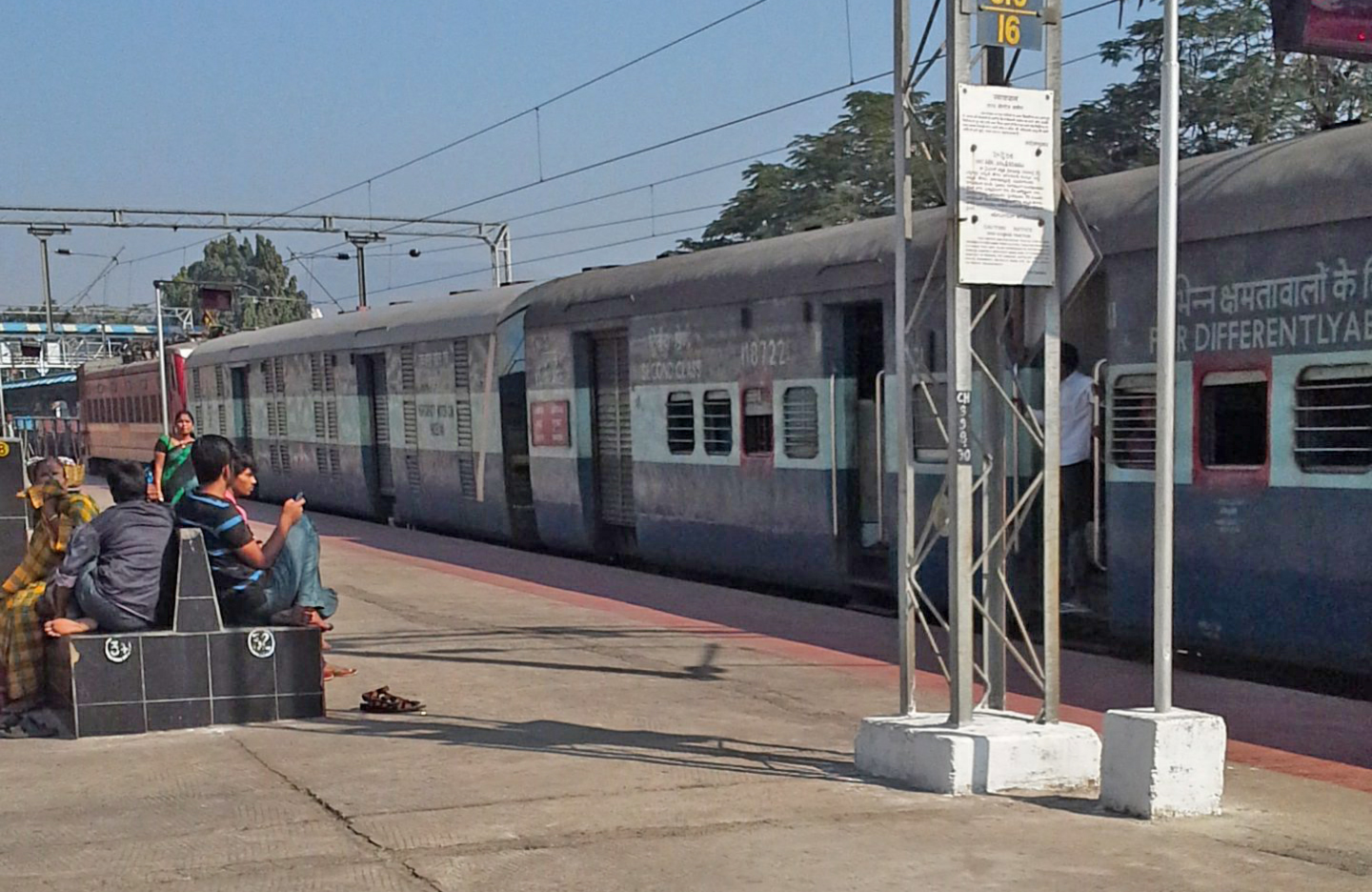
- Amaravati Express is a prestigious train running on Guntakal–Vasco da Gama section

Overview
- Status: Operational
- Owner: Indian Railways
- Locale: Andhra Pradesh; Karnataka; Goa
- Termini: Guntakal Junction (GTL); Vasco da Gama (VSG)
- Stations: 73

Service
- Services: Mahabubnagar-Munirabad line
- Route number: 7/7A/49/49A
- Operator(s): South Central Railway zone South Western Railway zone

Technical
- Line length: 457 km (284 mi)
- Number of tracks: 2
- Track gauge: 1,676 mm (5 ft 6 in)
- Old gauge: 1,000 mm (3 ft 3 3/8 in)
- Electrification: Yes
- Operating speed: 100 kilometres per hour (62 mph)

The Guntakal–Vasco da Gama section, or Mormugao Railway (formerly known as West of India Portuguese Railway), is a railway line connecting the town of Guntakal in Andhra Pradesh and Vasco da Gama in Goa, India. It traverses the Western Ghats and covers a distance of 457 kilometres (284 mi) across Goa, Karnataka and Andhra Pradesh.

It is operated by the public companies Indian Railways — through its operating subsidiaries South Central Railway zone and South Western Railway zone

== History ==
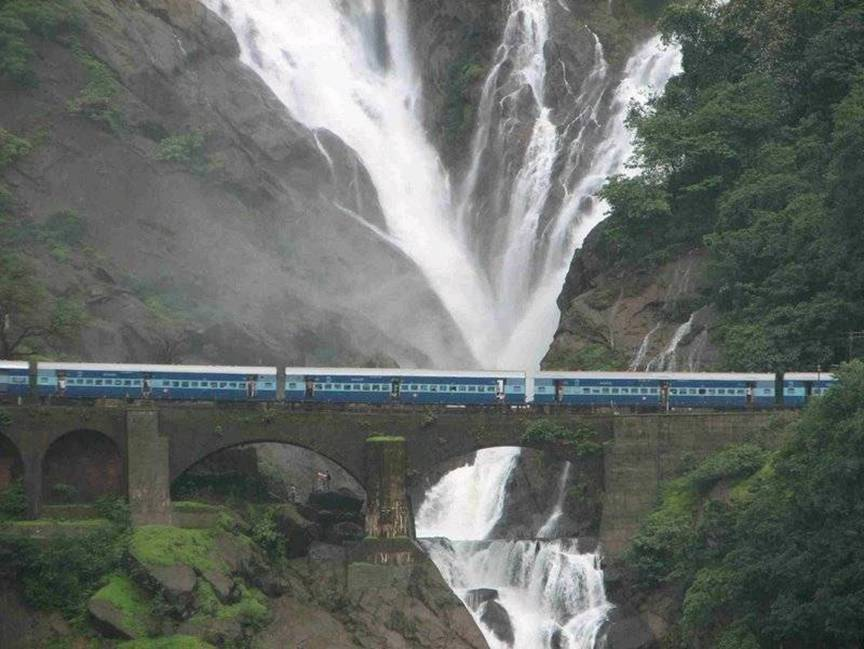
The Railway Line passes along Dudhsagar Falls

In the year 1878, an agreement was signed between the West of India Portuguese Guaranteed Railway Company (WIPR) and the Portuguese Government of Portuguese India for the construction of Harbour and connected Railway but the railway work started, only in 1882.

In December 1887, The total length of the existing meter gauge railway track in the Goan Territory of 43 km between Mormugao-Sanvordem via Vasco da Gama, was inaugurated. In 1888, Mormugao was connected with Southern Maharatta Railway at Caranzol-Castle Rock junction.

In 1902, with the metre gauge line on the verge of bankruptcy, the company leased the railway to the Southern Mahratta Railway, which continued to manage railway until 1955. With independence, the WIPR's operation passed to Indian Railways and, in 1951, to the Southern Railway.

From 1955 to 1961, the lines within the Portuguese enclave of Goa reverted to Portuguese control. An autonomous body named Junta Autónoma dos Portos e Caminhos de Ferro do Estado da Índia ("Autonomous Board of the Ports and Railways of the State of India") constituted by the Portuguese Government took over the administration of the Port and Railway on 1 April 1961 from Western India Portuguese Railway on the termination of the contract.

However, in 1962 upon the annexation of Goa on 19 December 1961, administration of the Port and its connected railway was taken over by the Government of India on 8 January 1962. In 1963, the line was again taken over by Indian Railways and came under Southern Railway. The main Railway section from Vasco da Gama to the border of Goa was transferred to Southern Railway on 1 May 1963, thus delinking the port from the Railway management.

On 19 July 1990, all railways in the Konkan Region (including all sections of the state of Goa), which were managed by the Indian Railways, came under the operational control of the Konkan Railway Corporation. Meanwhile, the inland sections of the states of Karnataka and Andhra Pradesh remained under the management of the Indian Railways company — through its operating subsidiaries South Central Railway zone and South Western Railway zone.

In 1996-1997 the Konkan Railway was connected with the Mormugao Railway, in a contiguous stretch of approximately 15 km between Margao and Vasco da Gama.

In 1998, the complete overhaul of the railway was completed, replacing the metric gauge (1.000 mm) with the Indian gauge (1.676 mm).

== Main stations ==
The main railway stations of the Mormugao Railway are:

- Port of Mormugao (MRH)
- Vasco da Gama (VSG)
- Margao (MAO)
- Kulem (QLM)
- Castle Rock (CLR)
- Londa (LD)
- Alnavar (LWR)
- Dharwad (DWL)
- SSS Hubballi (UBL)
- Gadag-Betigeri (GDG)
- Hosapete (HPT)
- Ballari (BAY)
- Guntakal (GTL)
