= Hosapete Junction railway station =

Railway station in Karnataka, India

Hosapete Junction Hospet Junction

General information
- Other names: Vijayanagara Junction
- Location: Hospet, Vijayanagara district, Karnataka; India
- Coordinates: 15.2865°N 76.3867°E
- Elevation: 471 metres (1,545 ft)
- System: Indian Railways station
- Owner: Indian Railways
- Operator: South Western
- Lines: Guntakal–Vasco da Gama section Hospet-Kotturu-Amaravathi Colony Jn. railway line
- Platforms: 3
- Tracks: 5 (construction – electrification of double 5 ft 6 in (1,676 mm) broad gauge)
- Connections: Auto stand, City Bus

Construction
- Structure type: Standard (on ground station)
- Parking: Yes
- Cycle facilities: Yes

Other information
- Status: Functioning
- Station code: HPT
- Zone(s): South Western
- Division(s): Hubli
Location

Hosapete Junction railway station, also called as Hospet Junction railway station or Vijayanagara Junction railway station (Station code: HPT) is a railway station in Vijayanagara district, Karnataka. It serves Hosapete city. The station consists of three platforms. It is a station with fuel and water filling facility, like Hubballi Railway station, station have amenities such as a computerized reservation office, waiting room, retiring room, book stall & canteenss.

== Major trains ==
Some of the important trains that run from Hosapete Junction are:

- Amaravati Express
- Hampi Express
- Kacheguda–Hubballi Prasanti Nilayam Express
- Hubballi–Chennai express (via Bellary)
- Hyderabad–CSMT Kolhapur Express
- Mysuru–Sainagar Shirdi Weekly Express
- Kacheguda–Vasco Da Gama Express
- Ajmer–Bengaluru City Garib Nawaz Express
- Haripriya Express
- Bhagat Ki Kothi–Bengaluru City Express (Via Bellari)
- Hubballi–Vijayawada Express
- Tirupati–Hubballi Intercity Passenger
- Bengaluru City–Hosapete Passenger
- Ballari–Dharwad Passenger
- Hosapete-Harihar DEMU
- Karnataka Sampark Kranti Express
- 11139/40 - Mumbai Hosapete Express
