= Castle Rock, Karnataka =

Castlerock
- village
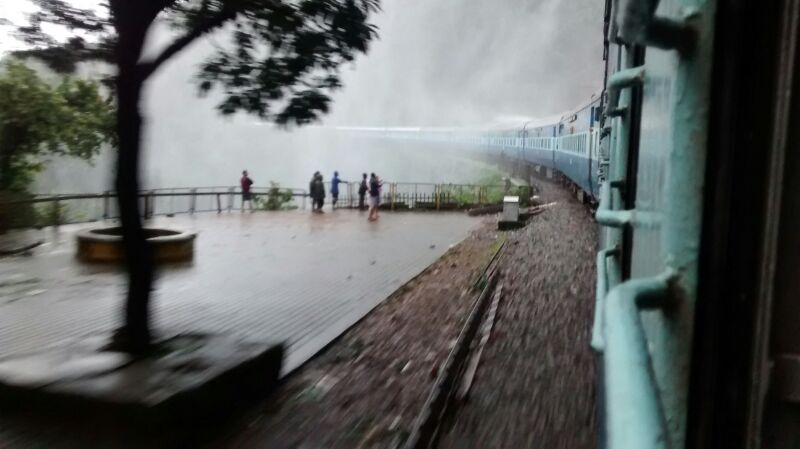
- Castle Rock railway station

- Location in Karnataka, India Castlerock (India)
- Coordinates: 15.3979°N 74.3322°E
- Country: India
- State: Karnataka
- District: Uttara Kannada
- Elevation: 621 m (2,037 ft)

Population (2011)
  - Total: 5,000 (Approx)

Languages
  - Official: Kannada
- Time zone: UTC+5:30 (IST)
- PIN: 581121
- Telephone code: 08383

Castle Rock is a village in the Uttara Kannada district of the Indian state of Karnataka. The village is located in the Western Ghats on the state's border with Goa - at an elevation of 621 m (2,040 ft).

Located in a heavily forested area, Castle Rock's vegetation is moist tropical deciduous. Manganese mines form the main economy of the region. The village lies within the Dandeli Tiger Reserve.

== History ==
For many years, the village marked international border between Portuguese-held Goa and British-held India. Transit between Portuguese India's Goa territory and British India (till Indian independence) and later between Portuguese India's Goa territory and India till Annexation of Goa, was treated similar to international travel. All the formalities of international travel including customs checks and verification of travel documents were carried out at Castle Rock.

A metre gauge railway line from Marmagao railway station to Castle Rock railway station was owned and operated by a British company named West of India Portuguese Railway (WIPR) which despite its name was a British company and it connected with the line in British India from Londa.

A metre gauge railway line used to connect the Goan towns of Vasco and Margao with the rest of India and was the only rail link in the state till the Konkan Railway started services in the early 1990s.

In the early 1990s, the Indian Railways converted the metre gauge line to broad gauge, thus connecting the old rail network with the rest of India. Metre gauge tracks can still be seen at the Castle Rock railway station.

== Transport ==
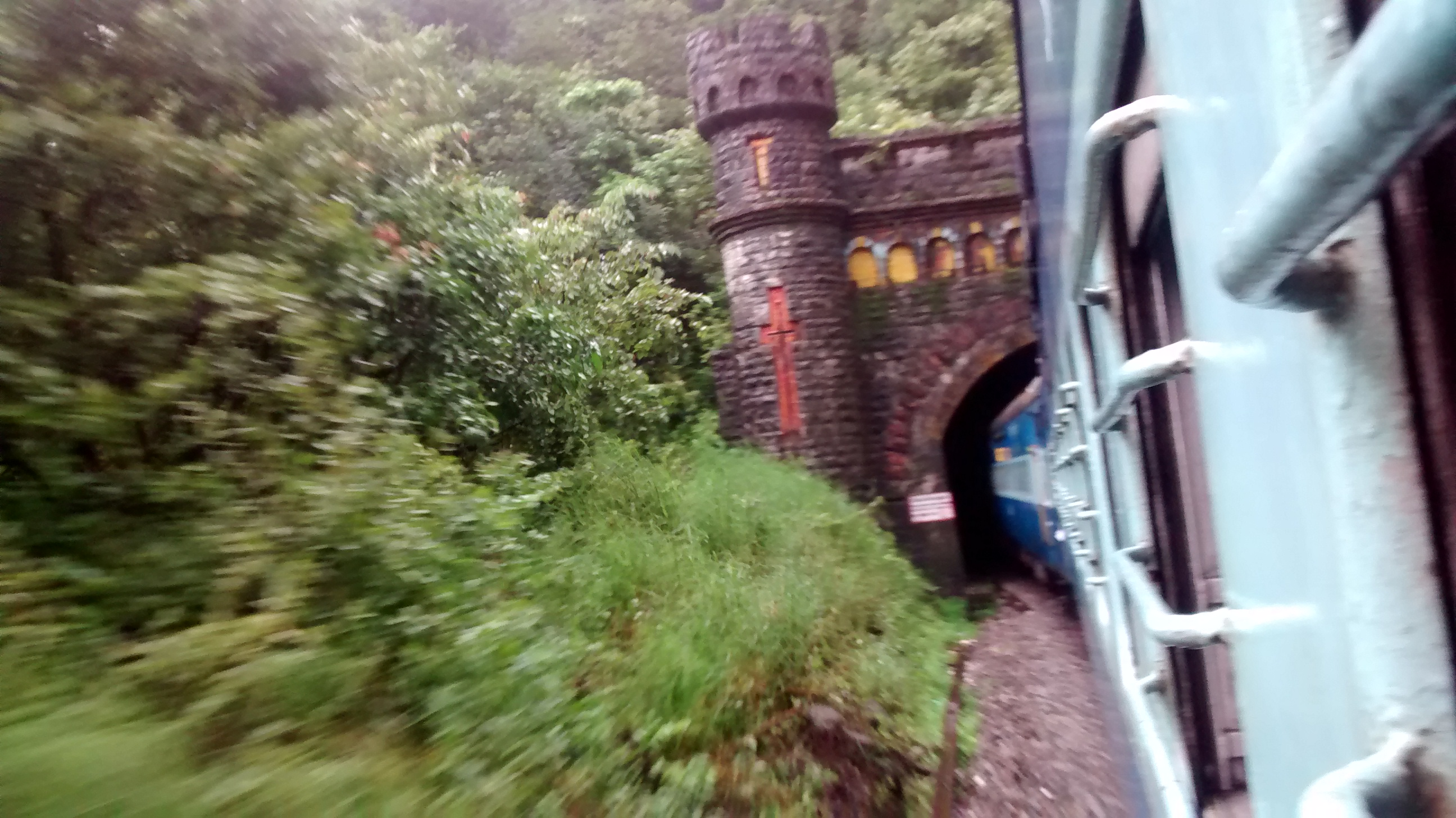
A tunnel near Castle Rock railway station, Karnataka

The terminus of the line today is Vasco da Gama railway station.

The Castle Rock railway station, Karnataka marks the beginning of the Braganza Ghats from the Karnataka side. The nearby Dudhsagar Falls is one of the main tourist attractions of Goa.

Mining is now banned and the area has been named Dandeli-Anshi Tiger Reserve.

== Castle Rock Forest Range ==
Castle Rock forest range office is within walking distance from the Castle Rock railway station. Castle Rock range is part of the Dandeli Wild Life Sanctuary, also known as Dandeli-Anshi Tiger Reserve.
