= Vasco–Chennai Express =

Express train

Vasco Chennai Express
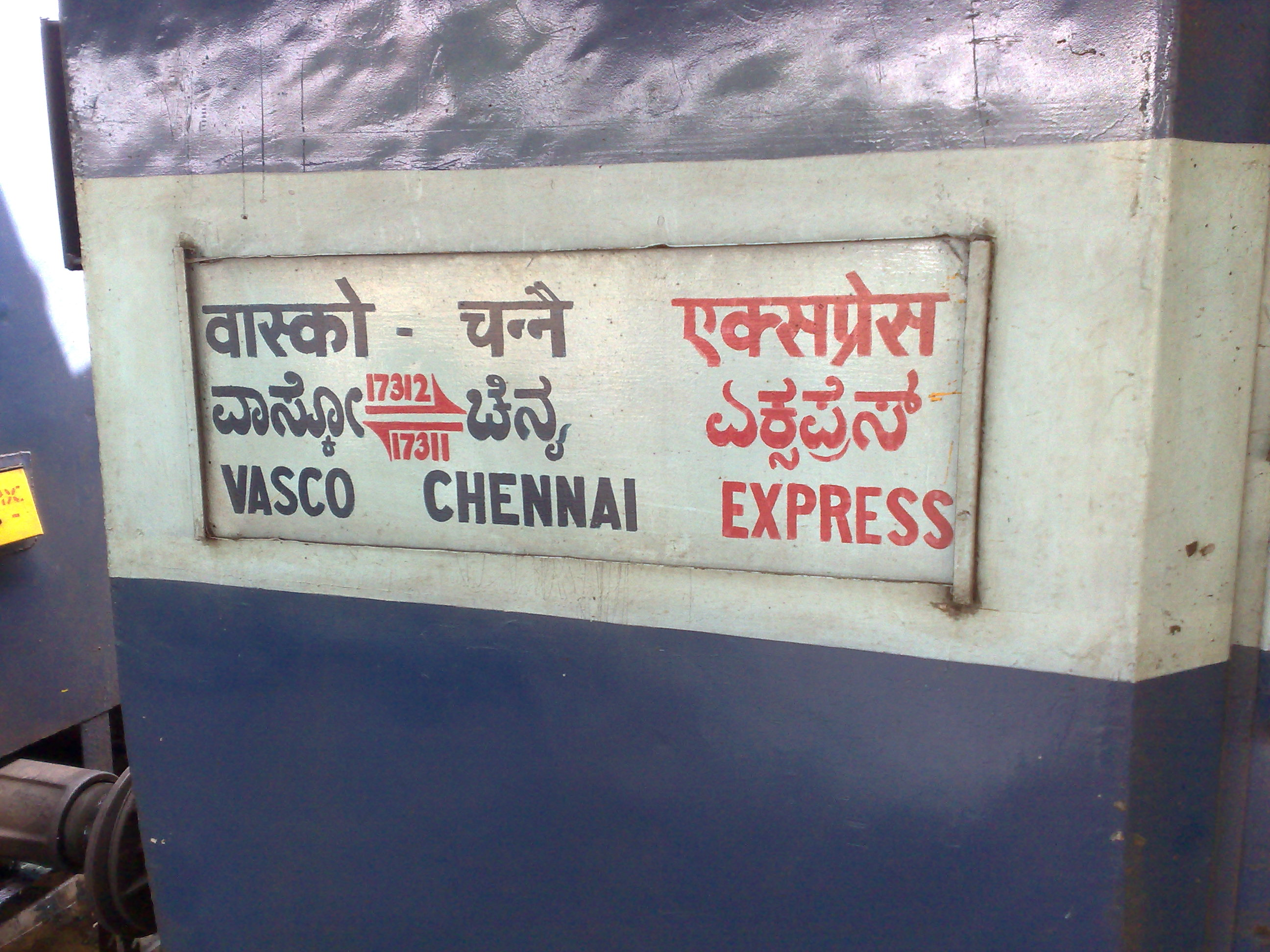

Overview
- Locale: Goa, Karnataka, Tamil Nadu
- Current operator(s): South Western Railways

Route
- Termini: Vasco da Gama; Chennai Central
- Stops: 21 as 17311 Vasco da Gama–Chennai Express, 22 as 17312 Chennai–Vasco da Gama Express
- Distance travelled: 1,070 km (665 mi)
- Average journey time: 21h 25m as 17312 Chennai–Vasco da Gama Express, 23h 10m as 17311 Vasco da Gama–Chennai Express
- Service frequency: One day a week. 17312 Vasco da Gama–Chennai Express – Thursday, 17311 Chennai–Vasco da Gama Express – Friday
- Train number(s): 17311 / 17312

On-board services
- Class(es): AC 2 tier, AC 3 tier, Sleeper class, General Unreserved
- Seating arrangements: Yes
- Sleeping arrangements: Yes

Technical
- Rolling stock: Standard Indian Railways coaches
- Track gauge: 1,676 mm (5 ft 6 in)
- Operating speed: 110 km/h (68 mph) maximum 48.00 km/h (30 mph), including halts
Route map
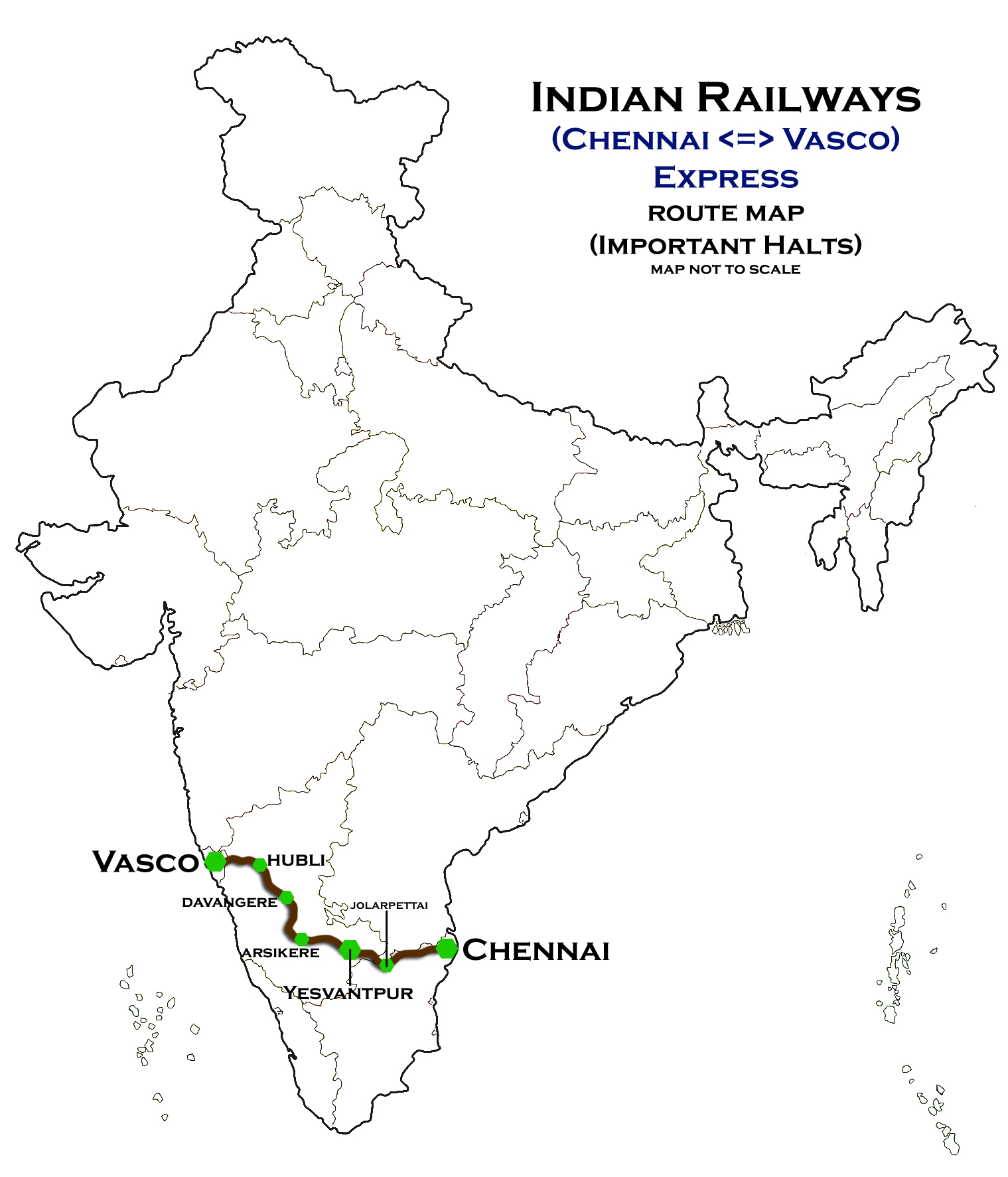

The Vasco da Gama–Chennai Express is an express train belonging to Indian Railways that runs between Vasco da Gama, Goa and Chennai Central in India. This train is currently being terminated at SSS Hubbali Junction.

It operates as train number 17312 from Vasco da Gama to MGR Chennai Central and as train number 17311 in the reverse direction. It used to be the only direct train service between Chennai and Goa.

== Coaches ==
The Huballi–Chennai Express presently has one AC 2 tier, two AC 3 tier, eleven Sleeper class and seven General Unreserved coaches.

As with most train services in India, coach composition may be amended at the discretion of Indian Railways depending on demand.

== Schedule ==
Train number	Station code	Departure station	Departure time	Departure day	Arrival station	Arrival Time	Arrival Day
17311	MAS	Chennai Central	3:00 PM	Friday	Vasco da Gama	1:00 PM	Saturday
17312	VSG	Vasco da Gama	2:30 PM	Thursday	Chennai Central	11:45 AM	Friday

== Reversals ==
- Yesvantpur Junction

== Rake sharing ==
17315/16 Vishwamanava Express

== Service ==
The 17312 Vasco da Gama–Chennai Express covers the distance of 1,070 kilometres in 21 hours 25 mins (49.96 km/h) and in 23 hours 10 mins (46.19 km/h) as 17311 Chennai–Vasco da Gama Express.

== Routeing ==
The Vasco da Gama–Chennai Express runs via Madgaon Junction, Castlerock, Hubli, Yesvantpur Junction to Chennai Central.

It reverses direction at Yesvantpur Junction.

== Traction ==
It is hauled from Vasco to Yesvantpur by a Krishnarajapuram-based WDP-4D. From Yesvantpur to Chennai Central it is hauled by a WAP-4 of Electric Loco Shed, Royapuram.

== Timetable ==
- 17312 departs Vasco da Gama every Thursday at 14:30 hrs IST and arrives Chennai Central at 11:55 hrs IST the next day.
- 17311 departs Chennai Central every Friday at 13:50 hrs IST and arrives Vasco da Gama at 13:00 hrs IST the next day.

Depart time changed to every Friday 15:00. Arrive time same as 13:00.

== Gallery ==
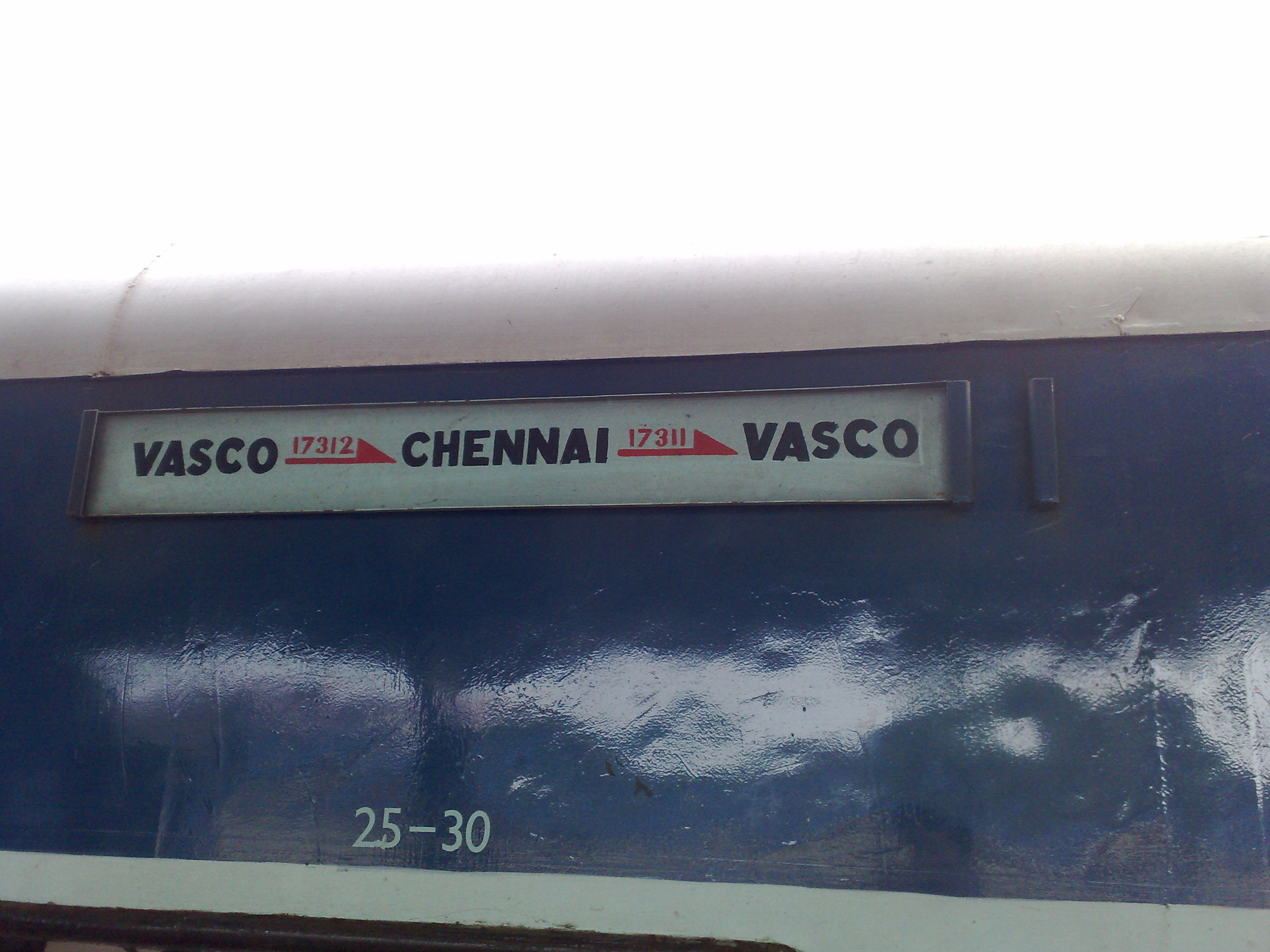
17311 Chennai–Vasco Express – coachboard

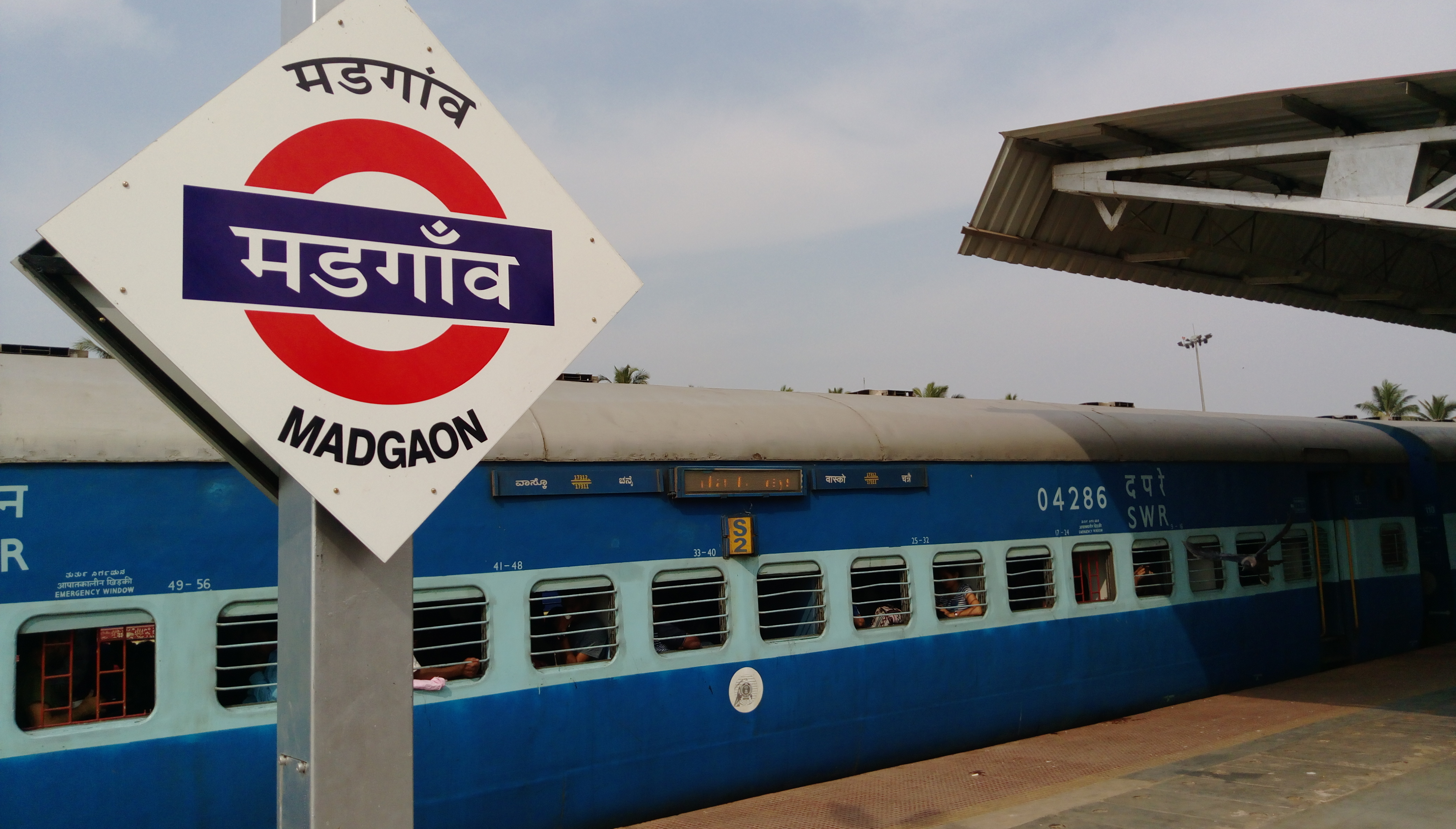
Vasco–Chennai Express at Madgaon station

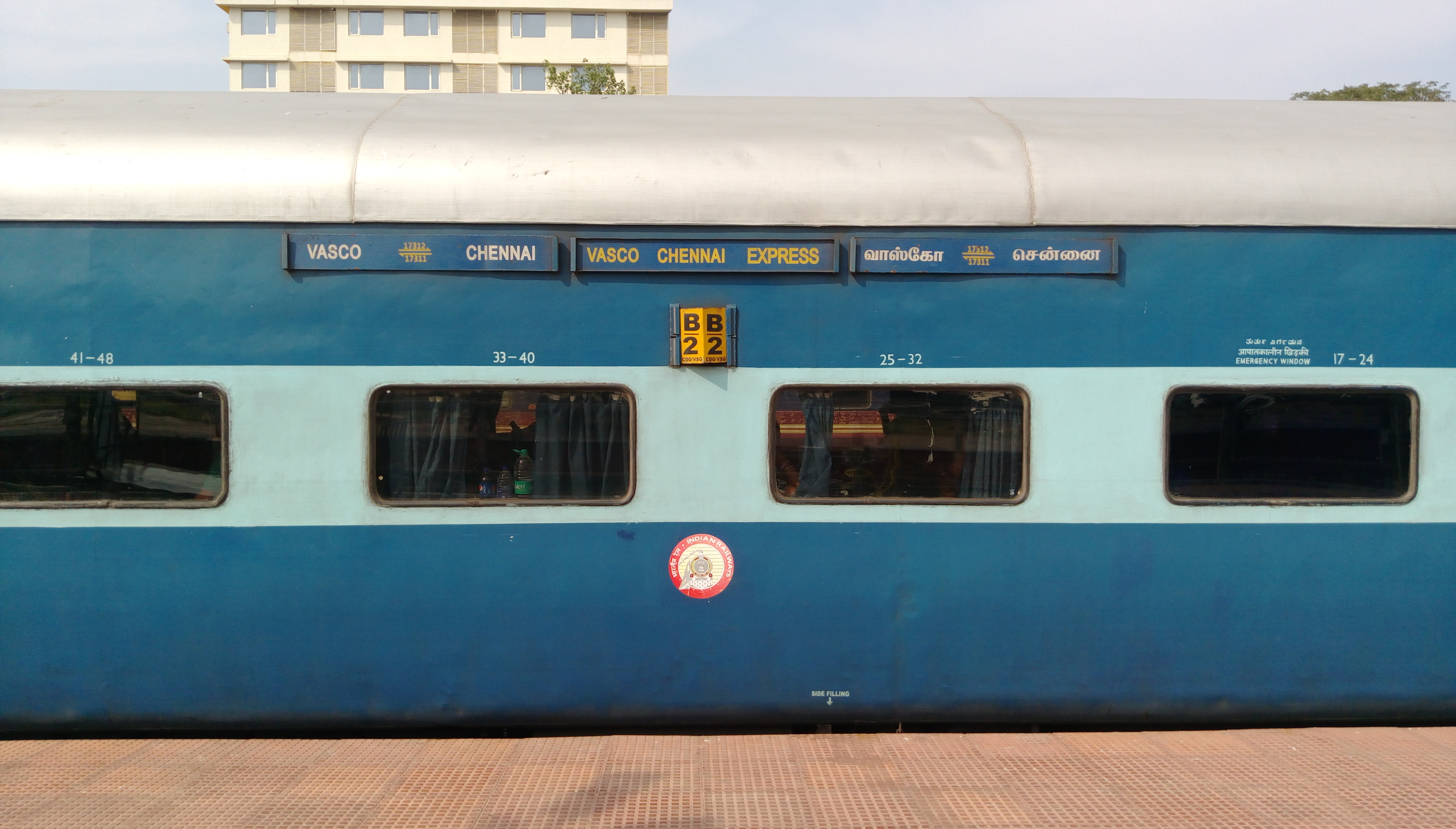
Vasco–Chennai Express – AC 3 tier coach
