= Goa Express =

Train in India

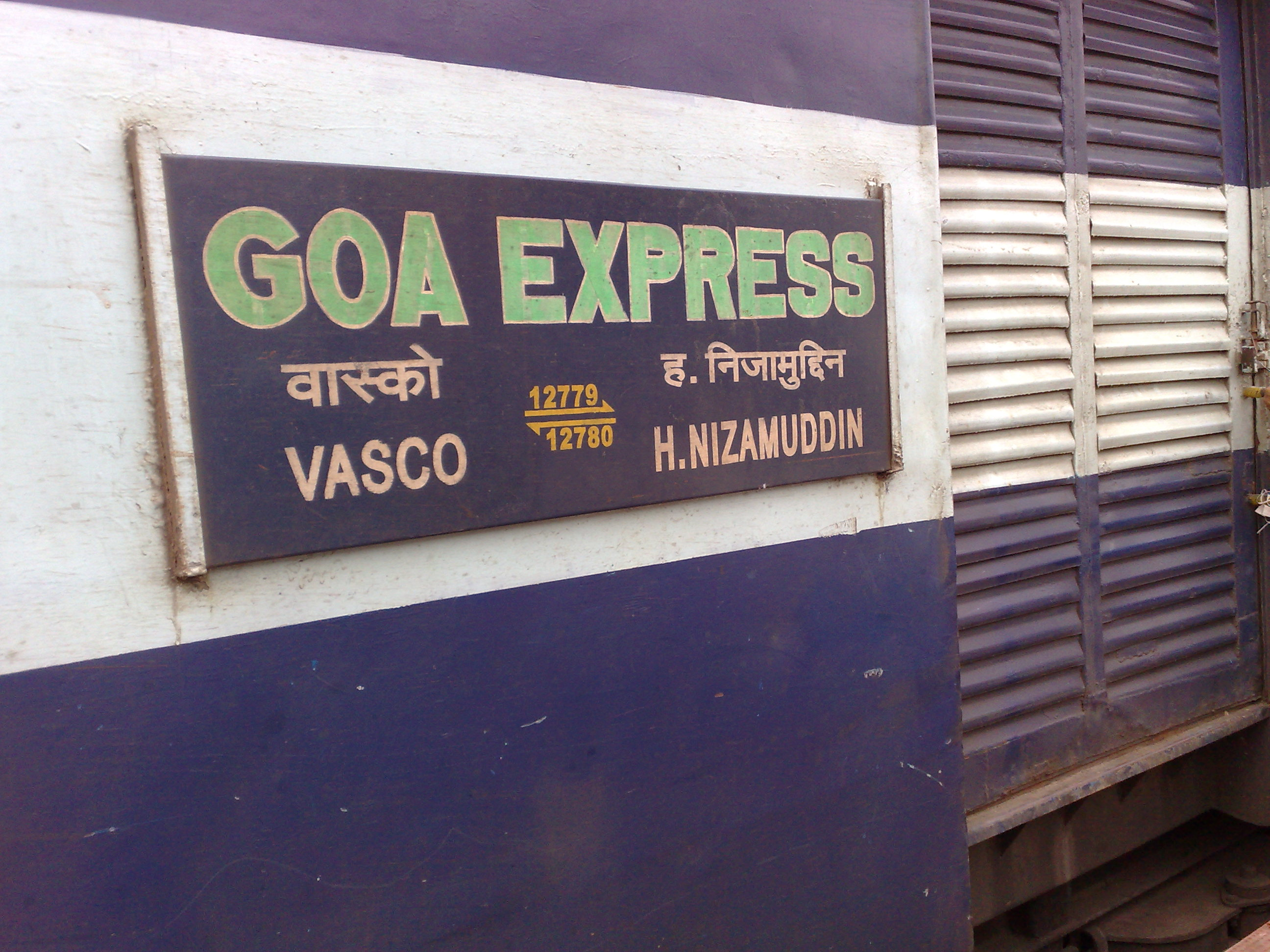

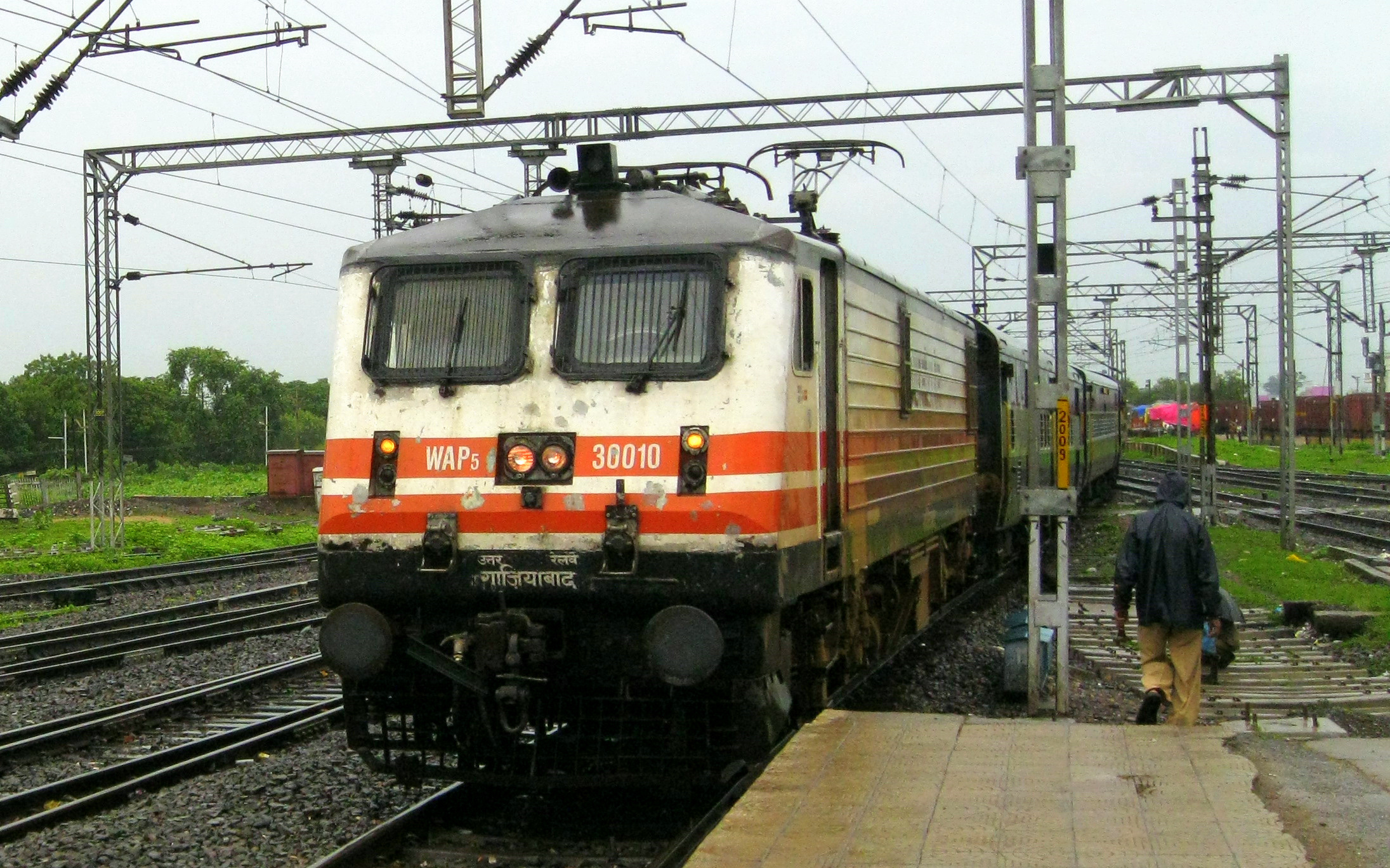
- Goa Express Entering Itarsi Junction railway station

Overview
- Service type: Superfast
- Locale: Goa, Karnataka, Maharashtra, Madhya Pradesh, Uttar Pradesh Haryana & Delhi
- First service: 18 June 1990; 35 years ago
- Current operator: South Western Railway

Route
- Termini: Vasco da Gama (VSG); Hazrat Nizamuddin (NZM)
- Stops: 27
- Distance travelled: 2,202 km (1,368 mi)
- Average journey time: 39 hrs 25 mins
- Service frequency: Daily
- Train number: 12779 / 12780

On-board services
- Classes: AC First Class, AC 2 Tier, AC 3 Tier, Sleeper Class, General Unreserved
- Seating arrangements: Yes
- Sleeping arrangements: Yes
- Catering facilities: Available
- Observation facilities: Large windows
- Baggage facilities: Available
- Other facilities: Below the seats

Technical
- Rolling stock: LHB coach
- Track gauge: Broad Gauge
- Operating speed: 55 km/h (34 mph) average including halt.
Route map
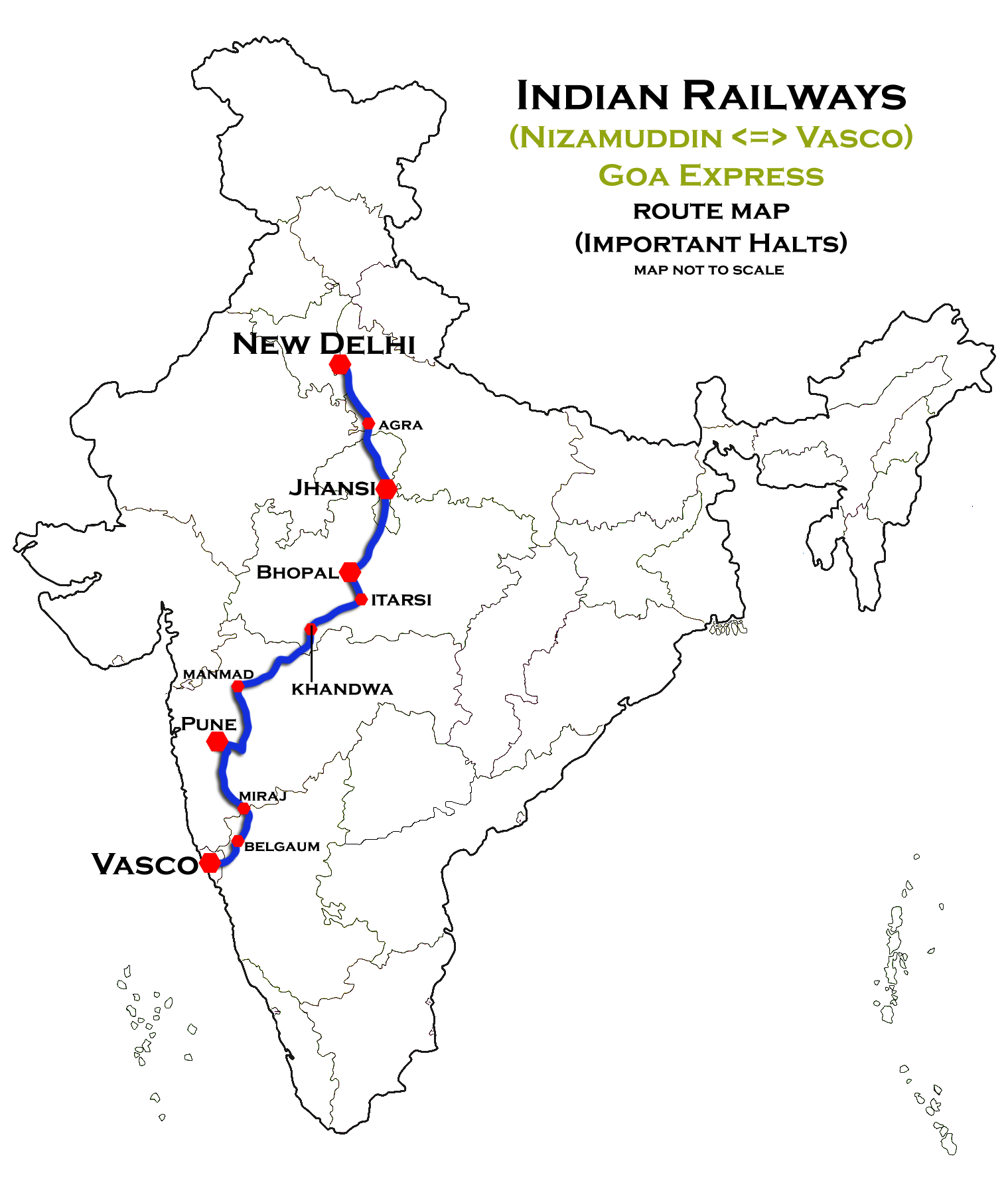

The 12779 / 12780 Goa Express is a daily superfast train run by Indian Railways connecting Vasco da Gama and Hazrat Nizamuddin in New Delhi. It is one of the high priority superfast trains of Indian Railways and additionally, a very important train for Hubli division of South Western Railway.

This train is similar to trains like Karnataka Express, Telangana Express and Andhra Pradesh Express amongst others in providing convenient link between respective state capitals and New Delhi. Vasco da Gama (IR Code: VSG) is the nearest railhead to the capital of Goa, Panjim. Panjim is not directly accessible by rail.

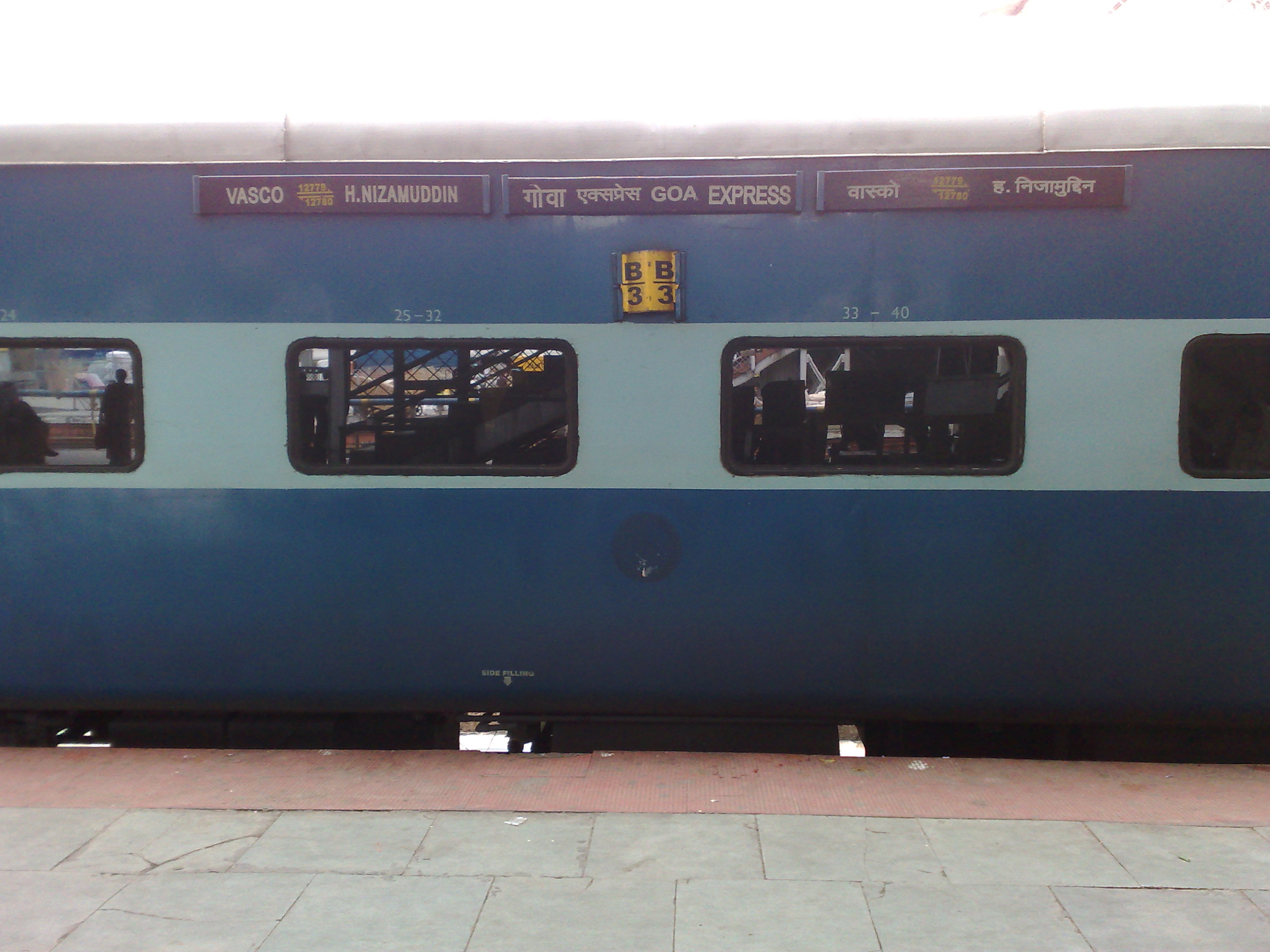
12779 Goa Express - AC 3 tier coach

== History ==
The train was introduced around 1987. At the time of introduction, rail links into Goa were Meter Gauge. Hence the train ran with a Broad Gauge and a Meter Gauge counterpart, the MG section between Vasco da Gama and Miraj, and the BG section between Miraj and Hazrat Nizamuddin. At the time of introduction the train was numbered 2479/2480, with maintenance in Delhi Railway Division of Northern Railway. Post gauge-conversion when the BG train ran the entire route, the train's maintenance was transferred to the Hubli Railway Division of the present day South Western Railway, and renumbered as 12779/12780.

== Route ==
Goa Express was introduced long before Konkan Railways became operational. Thus the train routes via, Margao, Londa, Belgaum, Miraj, Sangli, Karad, Satara, Pune, Daund, Ahmednagar, Manmad, Bhusawal, Khandwa, Itarsi, Bhopal, Jhansi, Gwalior, Agra and Mathura .

During its 39-hour-25-minute journey traversing a distance of about 2202 km, the train passes through Karnataka, Maharashtra, Madhya Pradesh, Uttar Pradesh, Haryana and passes through a small portion of Rajasthan at Dhaulpur without stopping.

The train is the only daily passenger express train to pass through the Dudhsagar Falls on the Braganza Ghat section. Also 12779 provides a good opportunity to passengers to enjoy the natural beauty of Goa en route and enjoy the scenic Vasco Da Gama to Londa Junction rail route.

== Accommodations ==
This train comprises 1 First AC, 1 AC 2-Tiers, 1 AC 3-Tiers, 2 AC 3-Tiers Economy, 6 Sleeper Class, 4 Unreserved General Compartment, 1 SLR, 1 Pantry car, 1 EOGs, 2 HCPs. Total coach composition is 20 coaches.

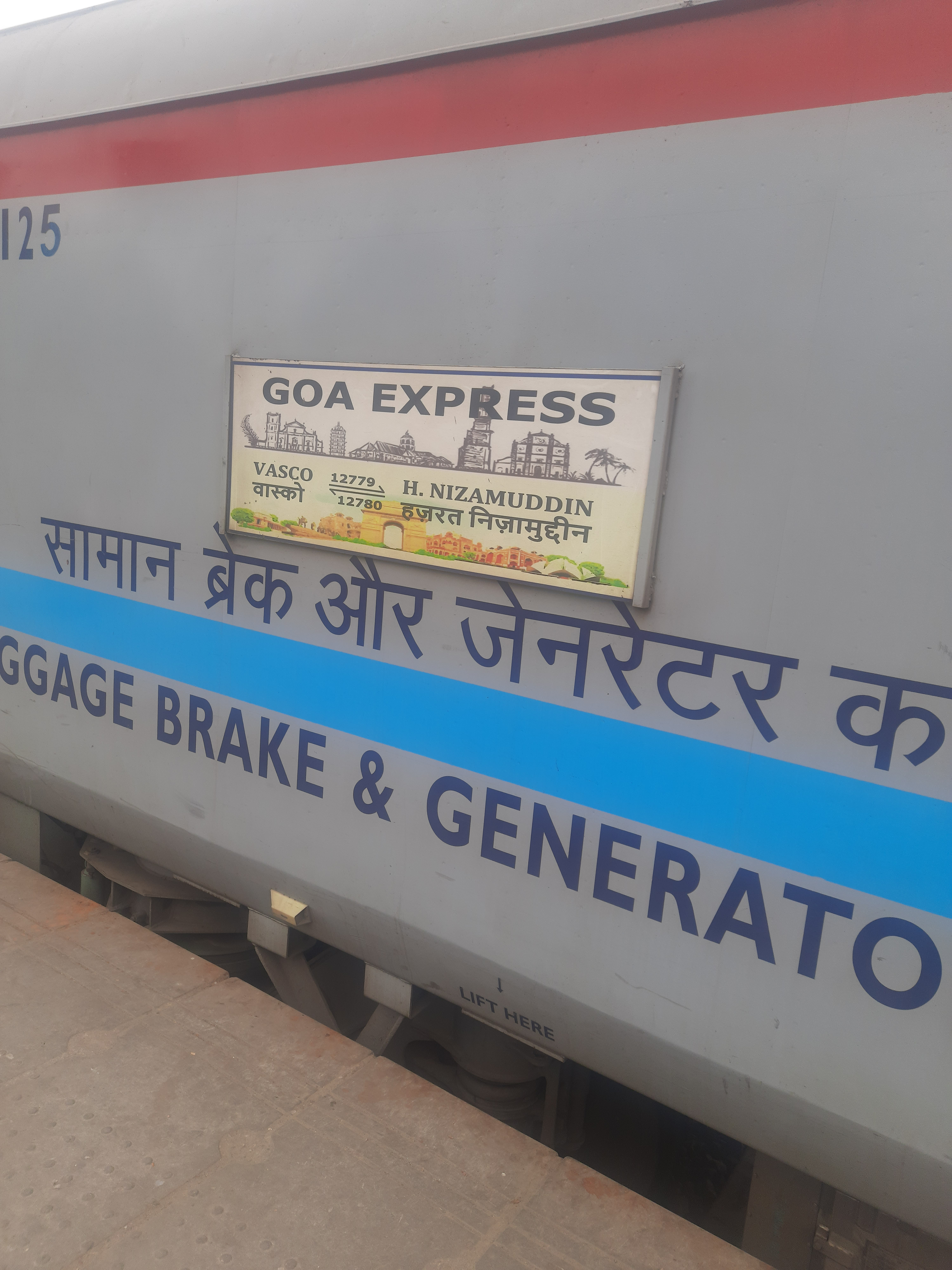
Goa express train board on LHB generator coaches

== Loco link ==
Both trains uses a Diesel and Electric Locomotives given below;

1. Vasco da Gama to Pune Junction a WDP-4D diesel locomotive from Pune Loco Shed .

2. Pune Junction to Hazrat Nizamuddin a WAP-7 electric locomotive from Tughlakabad Loco Shed.

== Time table ==
Station Code	Station name	Arrival	Departure
NZM	Hazrat Nizamuddin	---	14:50
MTJ	Mathura Junction	16:48	16:50
AGC	Agra Cantt	17:50	17:55
GWL	Gwalior Junction	20:30	20:32
JHS	Jhansi Junction	22:05	22:15
BPL	Bhopal Junction	02:35	02:45
ET	Itarsi Junction	04:25	04:30
HD	Harda	05:28	05:30
KNW	Khandwa Junction	06:58	07:00
BSL	Bhusaval Junction	08:45	08:50
JL	Jalgaon Junction	09:23	09:25
MMR	Manmad Junction	11:15	11:20
KPG	Kopargaon	12:18	12:20
BAP	Belapur	13:08	13:10
ANG	Ahmadnagar	14:17	14:20
DD	Daund Chord Line	15:38	15:40
PUNE	Pune Junction	16:55	17:10
STR	Satara	19:47	19:50
KRD	Karad	20:42	20:45
SLI	Sangli	21:42	21:45
MRJ	Miraj Junction	22:40	22:45
KUD	Kudachi	23:15	23:15
RBG	Raybag	23:34	23:35
GPB	Ghatprabha	00:01	00:02
BGM	Belagavi	01:10	01:15
LD	Londa Junction	02:35	02:45
CLR	Castle Rock	03:20	03:25
QLM	Kulem	05:05	05:10
SVM	Kudchade	05:39	05:40
MAO	Madgaon Junction	06:15	06:20
VSG	Vasco-da-Gama	---	07:25

== Direction reversal ==
Train Reverses its direction 2 times

- Londa Junction
- Pune Junction

Train no longer reverses its direction at Daund after completion of the new Chord line.

== See also ==
- Trains of SWR
- Goa Sampark Kranti Express
