= Hubli railway division =

Railway division of India

Overview
- Owner: South Western Railway zone
- Locale: Hubballi, Karnataka, India

Service
- Type: Railway division
- System: Indian Railways

History
- Opened: 5 November 1951; 75 years ago

Hubli railway division is one of the three railway divisions under the jurisdiction of the South Western Railway zone of Indian Railways. Formed on 5 November 1951, its headquarters are located in Hubballi, Karnataka.

Bengaluru railway division and Mysuru railway division are the other two railway divisions under the South Western Railway zone, which is also headquartered in Hubballi.

== Sections ==
- Gadag Junction–Hotgi Junction section
- Hubballi–Ankola section (under construction)
- Guntakal–Vasco da Gama section
- Alnavar Junction–Dandeli section
- Miraj–Londa section
- Bellary Junction–Chikkajajur Junction section
- Toranagallu Junction–Ranjitpura section
- Bagalkot Junction–Kudachi section
- Gadag Junction–Wadi Junction section
- Ginigera Junction–Raichur Junction section
- Hospet Junction–Amaravati colony Junction section
- Gunda Road Junction–Swamihalli section
- Rayadurg–Tumkur section
- Gadag Junction–Yalvigi section
- Mahabubnagar–Munirabad section

== List of railway stations and towns ==
The list includes the stations under the Hubballi railway division and their station category.

Category of station	No. of stations	Names of stations
A-1	1	Hubballi Junction
A	9	Belagavi, Bellary Junction, Vijayapura, Haveri, Dharwad, Hosapete Junction, Vasco da Gama
B	6	Gadag Junction, Alnavar Junction, Londa Junction, Bagalkot, Toranagallu Junction, Koppal, Gangavathi, Sindhanur, Ghataprabha, Ranibennur
C Suburban station	1	-
D	-	-
E	-	-
F Halt station	-	-
Total	-	-
