= Amaravati Express =

Train in India

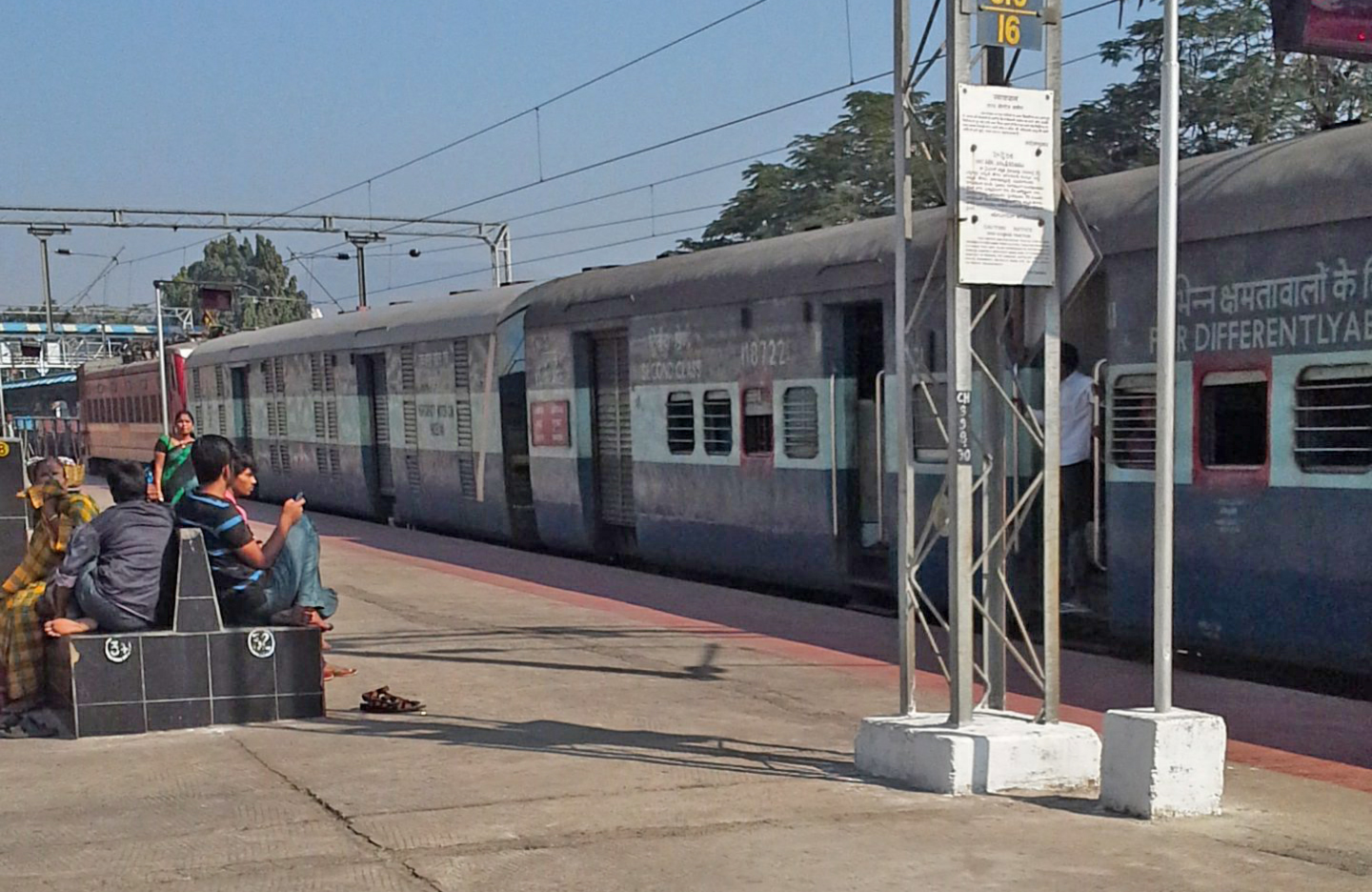
Shalimar-bound 18048 Amaravati Express at Vizianagaram Junction

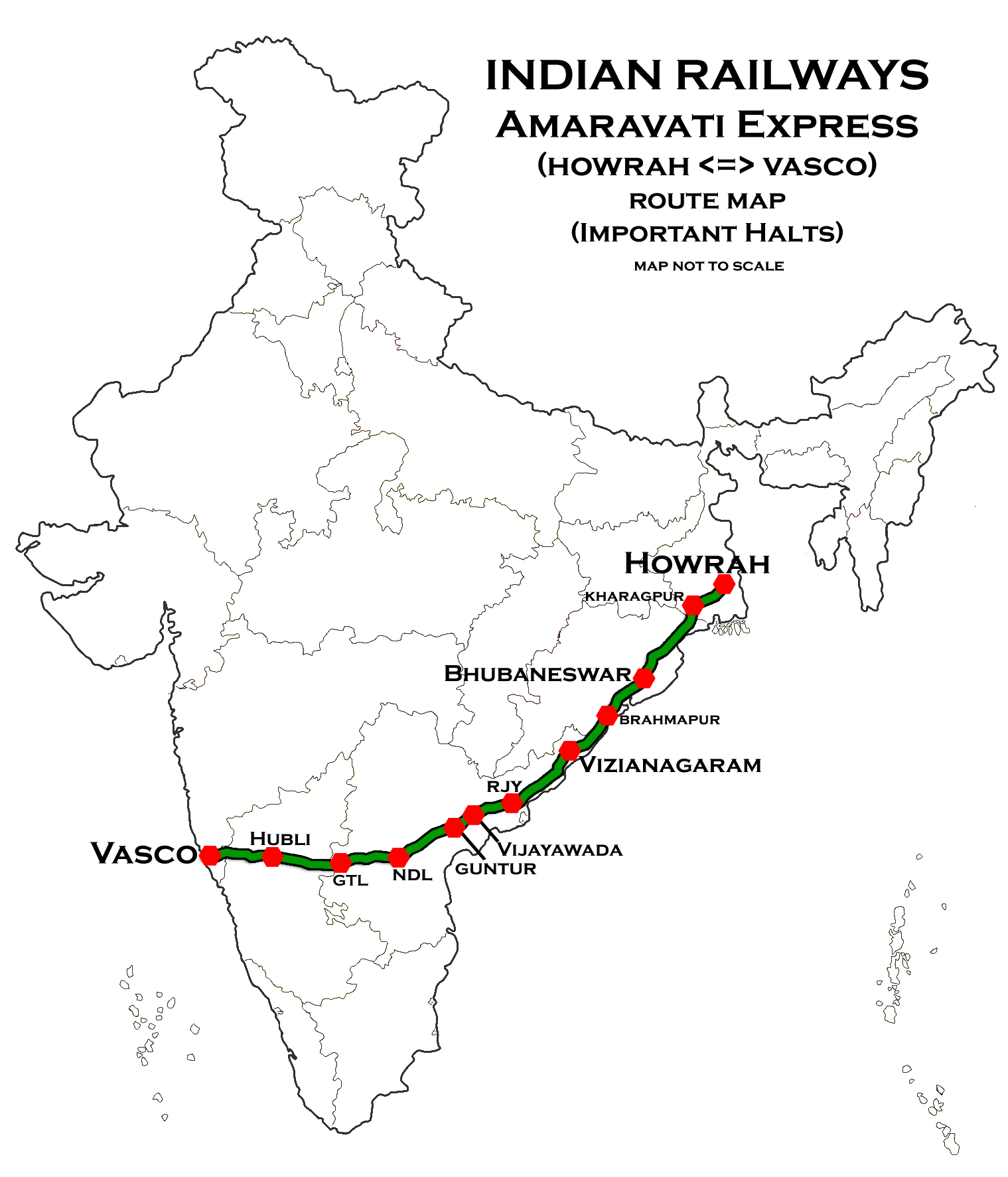
18047/18048 Amaravati Express (Howrah–Vasco) route map

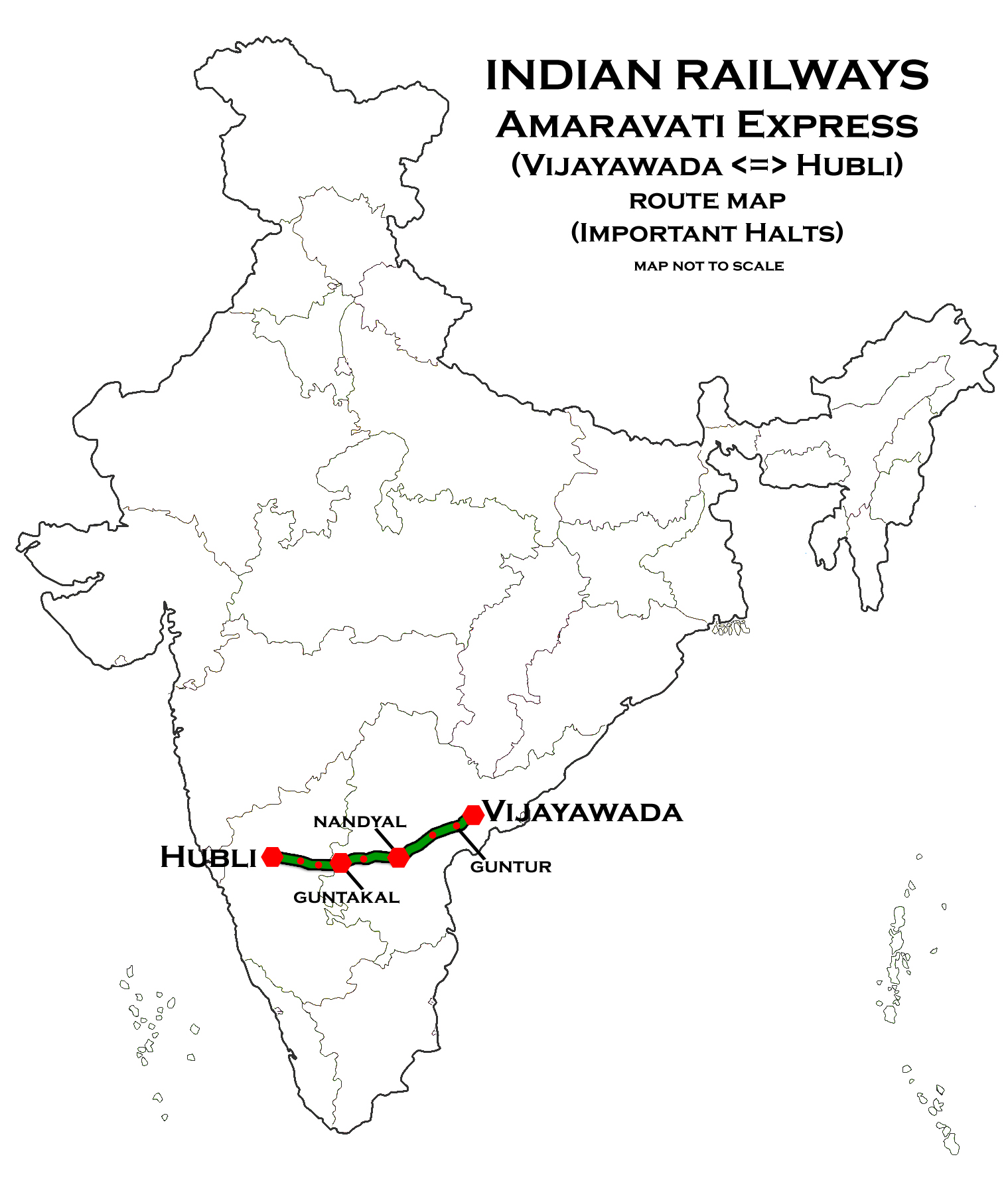
17225/17226 Amaravati Express (Vijayawada–Hubli) route map

Amaravati Express is the name given to two services operated by Indian Railways.

As at January 2024, these train services are

- 17225 Narsapur–SSS Hubballi Amaravati Express
- 17226 SSS Hubballi–Narsapur Amaravati Express

This service runs daily each way and is operated by the Vijayawada division of South Central Railway (SCR). The train runs across southern India from Andhra Pradesh to Karnataka.

- 18047 Howrah–Vasco da Gama Amaravati Express
- 18048 Vasco da Gama–Howrah Amaravati Express

This service runs four times a week each way. It operates via Visakhapatnam, Vijayawada, Guntur, Nandyal, Guntakal, Ballari, Hosapete, Gadag,Hubballi Junction , Dharwad, Londa, Madgaon. This service is operated by the South Eastern Railway (SER), Kharagpur division. The train travels from West Bengal through Orissa and Andhra Pradesh in the east of India to Karnataka and Goa in the south-west of India.

The Amaravati Express is popular with the inhabitants of Andhra Pradesh particularly those living in the cities and towns of Vijayawada, Guntur, Narasaraopet, Markapur, Cumbum, Giddaluru, Nandyal, Mahanandi, Guntakal and Bellary and the surrounding regions.

== History ==
The Amaravati Express runs on the historical Machilipatnam–Mormugao railway track.

The service was first introduced during the 1950s as the metre-gauge train between Guntur and Hubli. The Guntur–Hubli fast passenger service was upgraded to an express service between 1987 and 1990, and was then named the Amaravati Express.

The train coaches were hauled by a YP steam locomotive and had a slip coach from Vasco da Gama to Guntur. This slip coach to Guntur was attached to the Gomantak Express, along with slip coaches to Gadag. These slip coaches were then attached to the Miraj-Gadag link express at Londa, and the slip coach to Guntur was then attached to the Hubli Guntur fast passenger service at Gadag. This practice of attaching/detaching the slip coaches was discontinued at Gadag and instead the slip coaches went as far as Hubli after the introduction of the Amaravati Express. This practice continued until the gauge conversion work started in the mid-1990s, and the train tracks were standardised in 1997.

The train service was extended to Vijayawada in 1994. While the gauge conversion activities were taking place in the mid-1990s, the train service was split into different segments and the full service was not fully restored until 1997.

By the beginning of 2000, the train service had been extended to Londa Junction, Castle Rock and eventually to Vasco da Gama as the gauge conversion progressed. The train was finally commissioned as a daily train between Vasco da Gama and Vijayawada in the mid-2000. But due to a poor response from passengers, the frequency was reduced to bi-weekly and for the remaining 5 days the train terminated at Hubli.

From the beginning of 2003, the service frequency increased to three times a week and the Vijayawada–Hubli services operated on the remaining four days each week. From July 2007, the train service from Vasco da Gama was further extended to Howrah.

In 2010 the 7225/7226 Vijayawada–Hubli service was renumbered as 17225/17226 and the 8047/8048 Howrah–Vasco da Gama service was renumbered as 18047/18048.

On 12 February 2013, Railway minister Mallikarjuna Karge increased the frequency of Amaravathi Express 17225/17226 which runs between Hubli and Vijayawada from 3 days to daily.

On 2018, the ICF Utkrisht Coaches are introduced so Amaravati Express gets an upgraded to refurbished ICF Utkrisht coaches

On 12 January 2024, The train 17225/17226 is extended till Narsapuram and the extended portion is inaugurated by minister G. Kishan Reddy at Guntur

As per revised time table new train timings come into operation very soon.

== Origin of name ==
The train service is named after the historical capital city of the Satavahana dynasty, Amaravati in the present day Guntur district. Amaravati is also known as the Sanchi of South India because of its stupas.

== Locomotives ==
all 3 given Amaravati Express trains below runs by both Electric and Diesel locomotives

The 17225/17226 Amaravati Express uses WAP-4 Electric locomotive and WDM-3D from the Vijayawada Shed of SCR between Vijayawada and Hubballi Junction . The 18047/18048 Amaravati Express uses both electric and diesel locomotives.

- Howrah to Visakhapatnam – WAP-4 of Santragachi (IR code: SRC) of S.E. Railways
- Visakhapatnam to Guntakal – WAP-4 or WAP-7 of Vijayawada (IR code: BZA) of S.Co. Railways
- Guntakal to Vasco da Gama Twin WDP4 or WDP4D of Gooty (IR code:-GY) of S.C. Railways.

The train bears the same loco link on its return itinerary.

== Other links ==
- Vijayawada, Guntur or Amaravati
- Andhra Pradesh
- Goa, Hubli, Bellary
- Howrah–Vasco da Gama Amaravati Express
