= Londa, Karnataka =

Londa
- Town
- Location in Karnataka, India
- Coordinates: 15°27′00″N 74°29′40″E
- Country: India
- State: Karnataka
- District: Belagavi
- Talukas: Khanapur
- Elevation: 652 m (2,139 ft)

Population (2011)
  - Total: 8,329

Languages
  - Official: Kannada
- Time zone: UTC+5:30 (IST)
- Postal code: 591301

Londa is a census town in Belagavi district in the Indian state of Karnataka.The town is on border with state of Goa. The town is surrounded by lush evergreen forests known as Sahayadri or Western ghats of India. Londa is situated at the border of Belagavi district with Uttara Kannada district. Londa Junction railway station is located on the Belgaum - Goa and Goa to Dharwad railway route. Since it is a junction of two railway routes, Many tourists alight here to visit nearby forests of Kali Tiger Reserve. Londa is also connected by National Highway 748 connecting Goa to Belagavi via Anmod ghat. It is also connected to Uttara Kannada district headquarters Karwar by Karnataka state highway 34 (SH34)via Hankon, Kumbarwada, Anshi, Joida, Ganeshgudi and Ramnagar. Londa is connected by National highway 67 (NH 67) coming from Hubballi and Dharwar.

== Geography ==
Londa is located at 15.47°N 74.52°E. It has an average elevation of 652 metres (2,139 ft). Forest

== Demographics ==
As of 2011 India census, Londa had a population of 8,329. Males constitute 51% of the population and females 49%. Londa has an average literacy rate of 72%, higher than the national average of 59.5%: male literacy is 80%, and female literacy is 63%. In Londa, 11% of the population is under 6 years of age.
