= Vasco da Gama railway station =

Railway station in Goa, India

Vasco da Gama
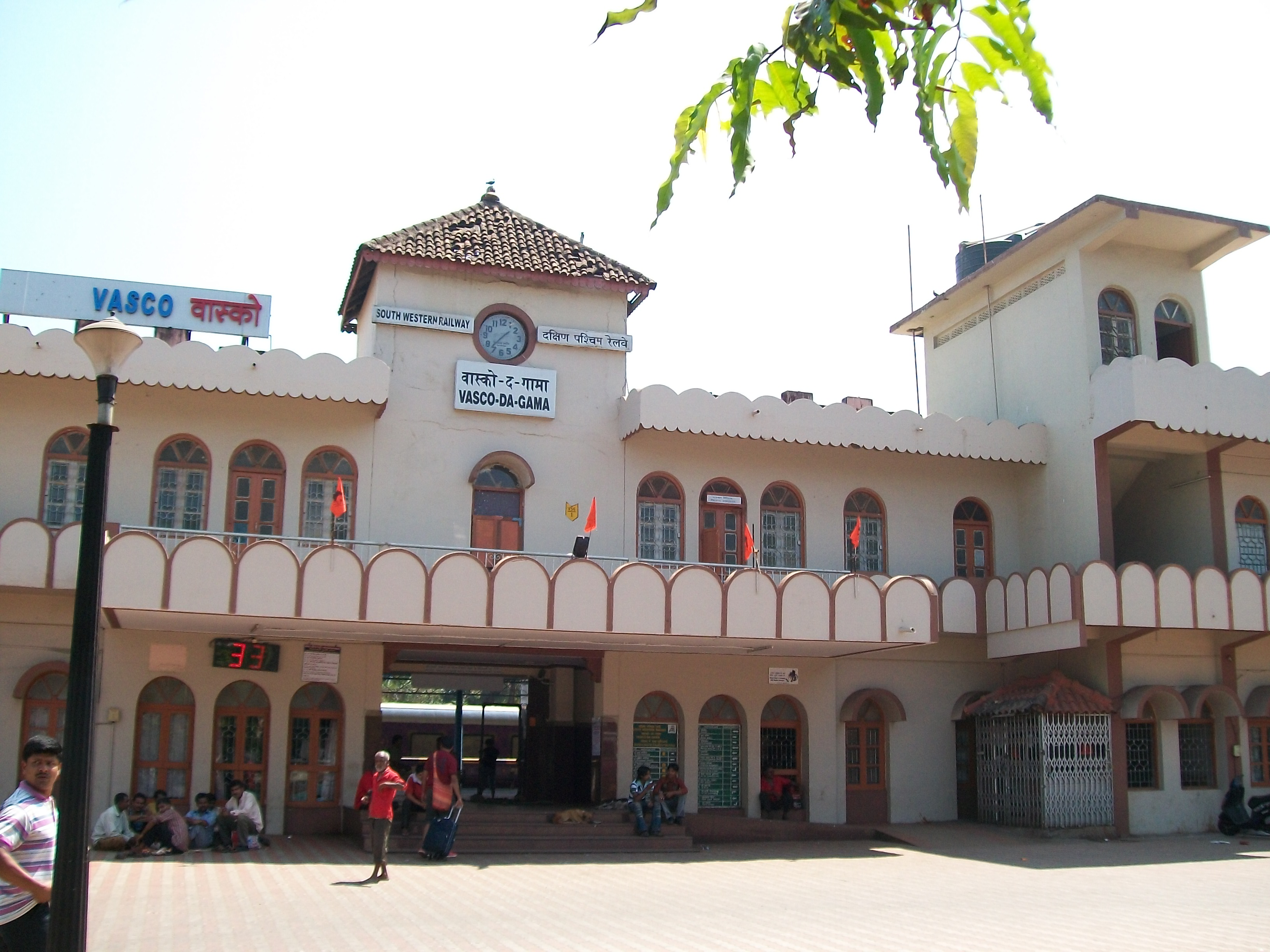
- Entrance of Vasco da Gama railway station.

General information
- Location: Swatantra Path, Vasco da Gama, Goa
- Coordinates: 15°23′46″N 73°48′42″E
- System: Express train & Passenger train station
- Owner: Indian Railways
- Operator: South Western Railway zone
- Line: Guntakal–Vasco da Gama section
- Platforms: 3

Other information
- Status: Functional
- Station code: VSG
- Zone(s): South Western Railway zone
- Division(s): Hubli

Services
Preceding station	Indian Railways	Following station
Marmagao towards ?	South Western Railway zone Guntakal–Vasco da Gama section	Dabolim towards ?
Location
- Location within Goa Location within India

Vasco da Gama (also known as Vasco-Da-Gama, station code: VSG) is a railway station serving Vasco da Gama in the Indian state of Goa.

Type: Terminus

Number of Platforms: 3

Number of Halting Trains: 0

Number of Originating Trains: 12

Number of Terminating Trains: 12

== History ==
The station was part of the Marmagao and Vasco metre-gauge railway line. This was the main rail in the state until the Konkan Railway was started in 1998.

== Major trains ==
The train which originates from Vasco-Da-Gama are:

● Vasco da Gama–Patna Superfast Express (12741/12842)

● Goa Express (12779/12780)

● Hyderabad–Vasco da Gama Express (17021/17022)

● Yesvantpur–Vasco da Gama Express (17309/17310)

● Vasco da Gama–Velankanni Weekly Express (17315/17316)

● Tirupati–Vasco da Gama Express (17419/17420)

● Howrah–Vasco da Gama Amaravati Express (18047/18048)

== Location and layout ==
It is located in Swatantra Path. It has 3 platforms.

== Jurisdiction ==
It comes under the jurisdiction of the Hubli division of the South Western Railway(SWR) Zone.
