= Vasco da Gama–Velankanni Weekly Express =

Indian rail service

Vasco Velankanni weekly Express is an Express rail operated by the Indian Railways. It connects Vasco da Gama in Goa with Velankanni via Madgaon, Hubballi, Yesvantpur, Salem Junction, Karur Junction, Tiruchirappalli Junction, Thanjavur Junction, Thiruvarur Junction and Nagapattinam Junction. The train takes 30 hours 15 minutes to complete the entire journey. The total distance covered is 1317 km.

== Direction reversal ==
Train Reverses its direction 3 times

- Erode Junction
- Tiruchirappalli Junction
- Nagapattinam Junction

Train no longer reverses its direction at Yesvantpur Junction after completion of the new Bypass Running Line.

== Demands ==
There are demands by the devotees who visits the Basilica of Our Lady of Good Health in Velankanni, regularly, insist Indian Railways to operate this train to reach velankanni on Sundays instead of Tuesdays and to depart this train from velankanni on Sundays instead of Tuesdays with no change in time table and also demand to stop this train at Tiruppattur.

== See also ==
- Pallavan Express
- Rockfort Express

== Coach composition ==
The train has standard LHB rakes.

- 1 AC II Tier
- 2 AC III Tier
- 3 AC III Tier Economy
- 8 Sleeper Coaches
- 4 General Unreserved
- 2 End On Generator

Loco	1	2	3	4	5	6	7	8	9	10	11	12	13	14	15	16	17	18	19	20
	EOG	GEN	GEN	S1	S2	S3	S4	S5	S6	S7	S8	B1	B2	M1	M2	M3	A1	GEN	GEN	EOG
