= Balehosur =

- Village
- Location within Karnataka Location within India
- Coordinates: 14°59′14″N 75°35′55″E
- Country: India
- State: Karnataka
- District: Gadag district
- Taluk: Lakshmeshwar

Population (2001)
  - Total: 5,347

Languages
  - Official: Kannada
- Time zone: UTC+5:30 (IST)
- PIN: 582112
- Vehicle registration: KA 26

Balehosur is a village in the Lakshmeshwar taluk of Gadag district in the Indian state of Karnataka.

== Demographics ==
As of 2001 India census, Balehosur had a population of 5347 with 2802 males and 2545 females.

== Importance ==
Balehosur is famous for Sri Dingaleshwara Mata and historical north-facing Maruti temple located in the village. Devotees from all over the region participate in the annual Jatra festival held at the end of April.

== Transport ==
Balehosur is well connected by road network to Lakshmeshwar and Savanur. Balehosur is 22 km from Taluka headquarters Lakshmeshwar.

== See also ==
- Shishuvinahala
- Shigli
- Gudgeri
- Kalasa, Kundgol
- Kundgol
- Gadag
