= Kalasa, Kundgol =

Kalasa
- Village
- Location within Karnataka Location within India
- Coordinates: 15°5′53″N 75°24′24″E
- Country: India
- State: Karnataka
- District: Dharwad district
- Taluk: Kundgol

Population (2001)
  - Total: 9,807

Languages
  - Official: Kannada
- Time zone: UTC+5:30 (IST)
- PIN: 581107
- Vehicle registration: KA 25

Gudgeri is a village in the Kundgol taluk of Dharwad district in the Indian state of Karnataka.

== Importance ==
Kalasa is the birthplace of Sri Guru Govinda Bhatta, Guru of Sri Shishunala Sharif.

== See also ==
- Shishuvinahala
- Gudgeri
- Lakshmeshwar
- Savanur
- Kundgol
- Dharwad
- Karnataka
