= Shigli =

- City
- Location within Karnataka Location within India
- Coordinates: 15°3′47″N 75°28′0.1″E
- Country: India
- State: Karnataka
- District: Gadag district

Languages
  - Official: Kannada
- Time zone: UTC+5:30 (IST)
- PIN: 582210
- Area code: 08487
- Vehicle registration: KA-26

Shigli is a city located in the Shirhatti taluk of Gadag district in Karnataka. It is situated 52 kilometres (32 mi) to the south of district headquarters Gadag, 26 km (16 mi) from Shirhatti, and 382 km (237 mi) from state capital Bangalore. Shigli's pin code is 582210, and the postal head office is Shigli.

The villages near Shigli include:

- Adarakatti (8 km),
- Ramagiri (10 km),
- Suranagii (12 km),
- Batturu (14 km),
- Adharahalli (16 km).

Shigli is surrounded by Shirhatti Taluk towards the north, Shiggaon Taluk towards the west, Haveri Taluk towards the south, and Kundgol Taluk towards the west. Lakshmeshwar, Savanur, Shiggaon, Gadag are the nearby cities to Shigli.

== Transport ==
By rail, the Yalvigi Railway Station, Kalas Halt Railway Station are nearby railway stations to Shigli. However, Hubli Jn Railway Station is a major railway station 52 km (32 mi) from Shigli.

== Demographics ==
The total area of Shigli is 827 hectares (2,040 acres). It is located is 663 meters (2,175 ft) above sea level. Kannada is the local language here. As of 2001 India census, Shigli had a population of 10,111, with 5,054 males and 5,057 females across 1,866 households.

== Schools and Colleges in Shigli ==
- Government middle primary school
- Gss Kgm School Shigli
- SS Koodalmath School Shigli
- SPMB science arts and commerce college shigli

== Nearby tourist places ==
- Laxmeshwar 7 km near
- Hubli 55 km near
- Dandeli 98 km near
- Uttara Kannada 108 km near
- Badami 109 km near
- Hospet 114 km near

== Nearby districts ==
- Haveri 34 km near
- Gadag 50 km near
- Dharwad 73 km near
- Koppal 89 km near

== Nearby railway stations ==
- Yalvigi Railway Station 7 km near
- Kalas Halt Railway Station 10 km near
- Savanur Railway Station 14 km near
- Gudgeri Railway Station 15 km near

== Nearby airports ==
Hubli Airport 59 km near Sambre Airport 142 km near Dabolim Airport 200 km near Kolhapur Airport 242 km near
