= Adivi =

Adivi is both a given name and a surname.

== Notable people ==
Notable people with the name include:

- Sai Kiran Adivi, Indian film director
- Adivi Sesh, Indian actor and film director
- Adavi Jayatirthacharya, was a Hindu seer, scholar, writer, philosopher and exponent of Madhvacharya's works and Dvaita school of thought.

== See also ==
- Adavi (disambiguation)
