= Gadag Junction railway station =

Railway station in Karnataka, India

Gadag Junction

General information
- Location: State Highway 6, Gadag, Karnataka; India
- Coordinates: 15°26′12″N 75°38′32″E
- Elevation: 654 metres (2,146 ft)
- System: Indian Railways station
- Owner: Indian Railways
- Operator: South Western Railway
- Lines: Gadag–Hotgi line Guntakal–Vasco da Gama section HDN-7A; Gadag–Yalvigi line Gadag–Wadi Junction line
- Platforms: 3
- Tracks: 9

Construction
- Structure type: Standard (on-ground station)
- Parking: Available
- Cycle facilities: Available
- Accessible: Disabled access

Other information
- Status: Functioning
- Station code: GDG
- Zone(s): South Western Railway zone
- Division(s): Hubli

History
- Opened: 1882; 144 years ago
- Electrified: Double electric-line

Passengers
- 2 to 5 million passengers per year
- Computerized Ticketing Counters Parking Disabled Access WC Public Transportation
Location
- Location within Karnataka

Gadag Junction railway station (station code: GDG) is a NSG-4 Category railway station under South Western Railway in Gadag district, Karnataka. It serves Gadag-Betageri. The station consists of three platforms. The station lies on Guntakal–Vasco da Gama section HDN-7A and also connects the Gadag–Hotgi railway line. The Gadag–Hotgi railway line was converted from metre gauge to broad gauge in December 2008.

Amenities at Gadag railway station include escalators at PF-1 & PF2, elevators at PF-1 & PF2, coach positioning display, computerized reservation office, waiting room, retiring room, free Wi-Fi facility, vegetarian and non-vegetarian refreshments, and book stall.

It is a "B" Category ISO 14001 2015 for Environmental Management System certified station on 10.02.2020.

== History ==
In 1881 the Bombay Eastern Deccan Railway was under construction with William Michell the Engineer-in-Charge. This line immediately upon opening became the Bijapur branch of the Southern Mahratta Railway.

The Southern Mahratta Railway (SMR) was founded in 1882 to construct a metre gauge (MG) railway between Hotgi and Gadag (opened to traffic in 1884), one of the "famine lines" set up with a guarantee. In the same year (1882), it was contracted by the Indian State of Mysore to work the several metre-gauge lines that the Mysore State had built or was in the course of construction.

In 1888, a line was extended from Londa towards the Portuguese colony of Goa where it connected with the Marmagao line at Castle Rock. (From 1902 this line was leased as the West of India Portuguese Railway). By 1890, this line extended from Londa eastwards via Guntakal to Bezwada, and northwards to Poona, turning the SMR from an assortment of branches to a real railway network. In 1908, the SMR merged with the Madras Railway (MR) to form the Madras and Southern Mahratta Railway (M&SMR).

== New lines ==
=== Proposed new line between Gadag Junction and Yalvigi ===
In August 2017, the Ministry of Railways sanctioned 56 km of rail line between Gadag Junction and Yalvigi. The final location survey for the new line between Gadag - Yelvigi (58 km) is in progress. As per SWR website the route alignment of the new line will be from Gadag-Binkadkatti (existing double line) towards Binkadakatti to Yalavigi via Harti (Gadag district), Shirahatti & Lakshmeshwara. Karnataka State Government has to start Land Acquisition Process after Final Location Survey Completion.

=== Proposed new line between Gadag Junction and Wadi Junction ===
In 2013–14, the Ministry of Railways sanctioned 252 km of rail line between Gadag Junction and Wadi Junction.

=== RET survey for new line (updating) between Gadag Junction to Harapanahalli (93 km) ===
The physical survey is completed and a report is under preparation.

=== Reconnaissance engineering cum traffic survey between Gadag Junction and Krishna (216 km) ===
There was a survey for conducting reconnaissance engineering cum traffic survey for new line between Gadag to Krishnar via Kotumachagi, Naregal, Gajendragarh, Hanumapur, Ilkal and Lingasugur (216 km).

== Rail line doubling & electrification works ==
=== Proposed doubling & rail electrification for Gadag Junction to Hotgi section ===
Gadag–Hotgi Rail doubling is sanctioned in 2014–15, doubling for part length of this project, i.e. from Hotgi–Kudgi (134 km) is taken up under Customer Funding Model. For this purpose NTPC have deposited Rs.946 cr. with Railway.

A new crossing station at Kudgi with four lines for giving connectivity to NTPC was commissioned on 29.01.2017.

Doubling work is completed in the section between Hotgi jn-Wandal station Tenders valued at Rs 14 crores have been called for redevelopment of the station. Gadag–Hotgi section is also sanctioned for electrification and tenders are floated for the same.

M/s Kalpataru PowerTransmission Ltd, Gandhinagar has been awarded for electrification of Hotgi to Gadag.

The sections between Wandal - Hotgi (148 km - NTPC Portion), Gadag - Hole Alur (52 km) have been commissioned in phases between the financial years 2018 - 2022.

The section between and HoleAlur – Badami (19 km) and Badami – Guledagudda (13.2 km) has been commissioned in the current financial year 2022-23 on 02.12.2022 and 15.02.2023 respectively.

The balance section Guledagudda – Almatti (44 km) is targeted to be commissioned in the FY 2023-24 and the section between Almatti – Wandal (08 km) is targeted to be commissioned by December 2024.

=== Proposed doubling & rail electrification for Hospet Junction to Vasco da Gama section ===
Gadag Junction will be a complete double electric line station as Hospet–Vasco Da Gama rail line is getting doubled and electrified in phases. Hospet–Hubli–Londa–Vasco-da-Gama DL (352.58 km) sanctioned in 2010–11. This project is being executed by RVNL. So far 67 km. has been commissioned. A further 36 km is targeted for commissioning in 2017–18. Hospet–Tinai Ghat rail electrification tender is floated.

== Major trains ==
Trains that run through/from Gadag Junction are:

- Howrah–Vasco da Gama Amaravati Express
- Gol Gumbaz Express
- Haripriya Express
- Hampi Express
- Hubballi–Secunderabad Express
- Hubballi–Varanasi Weekly Express
- Amaravati Express
- Yesvantpur–Barmer AC Express
- Yesvantpur–Bikaner Express
- Mumbai CSMT–Gadag Express*
- Solapur–Hubballi Intercity Express
- Tirupati–Vasco da Gama Express
- Hyderabad–Vasco da Gama Express
- Kacheguda–Hubballi Prasanti Nilayam Triweekly Express
- Mysore–Sainagar Shirdi Express
- Kacheguda–Vasco da Gama Quarterly Express
- Ajmer–Bangalore City Garib Nawaz Express
- Bhagat Ki Kothi−Bangalore City Express (via Guntakal)
- Tirupati/Hyderabad–Vasco da Gama Weekly Express
- Solapur–Gadag DEMU Passenger
- Vijayapur-Yesvantpur Special Fare Daily Exp
- Vijayapur-Mangaluru Jn Special Fare Daily Exp
- Solapur–Dharwad Passenger
- Vijayapura–Hubballi Special Passenger
- Guntakal–Hubballi Passenger
- Tirupati–Hubballi Special Fare Daily Exp
- Hubballi–Vijayawada Passenger
- Hubballi–karatagi Unreserved Express
- Hubballi–karatagi Special Express
- Hubballi–karatagi Special Express
- Belagavi–Secunderabad Special Fare Daily Express
- Yesvantpur–Hazarat Nizamuddin Karnataka Sampark Kranti Exp 5 days a week via Ballari
- Hubballi–Hazarat Nizamuddin Weekly Super Fast Express via Bijapur
- Sainagar Shirdi–Mysuru Weekly Express
- Hubballi–MGR Chennai Central Bi-Weekly Express
- Jodhpur–KSR Bengaluru Weekly Express
- Jasidih–Vasco da Gama Weekly Express
- Vijayapura–Hubballi Intercity Exp
- Hubballi–Hosapete DEMU Special
- Hubballi–Solapur Passenger
