= Ingalagi =

Ingalagi may refer to:

- Ingalagi, Belgaum, a village in the Belgaum district of Karnataka, India
- Ingalagi, Kundgol, a village in Kundgol taluk of Dharwad district of Karnataka, India
- Anand Ingalagi and Vijayendra Ingalagi, characters in the Indian KGF (film series)
