= Satyabodha Tirtha =

Hindu guru

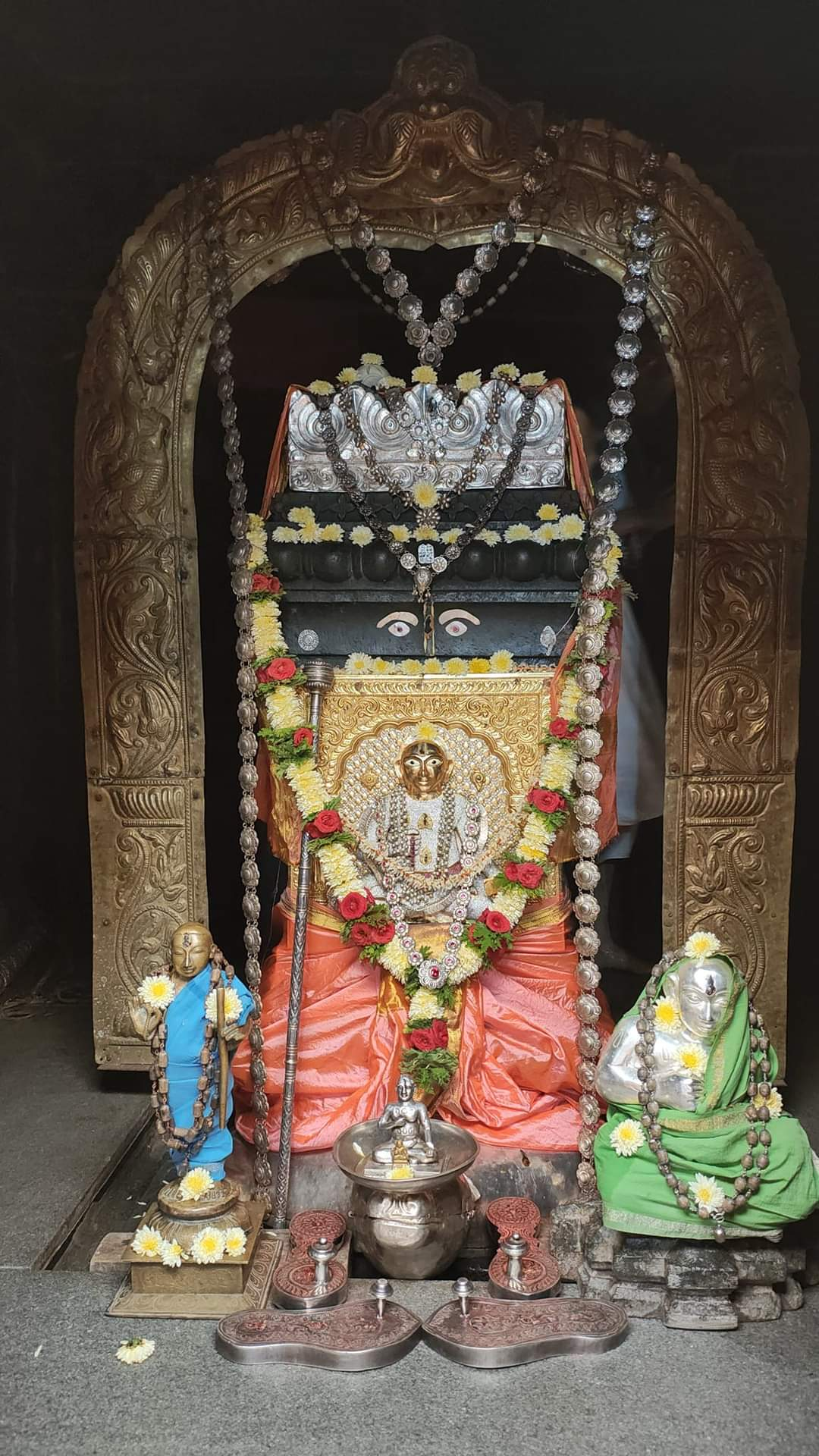
- Satyabodha Tirtha Brindavana at Savanur, Karnataka

Personal life
- Born: Raichur Ramacharya; 1710 Raichur
- Died: 1783 (aged 72–73) Savanur
- Resting place: Savanur

Religious life
- Religion: Hinduism
- Order: Vedanta (Uttaradi Math)
- Philosophy: Dvaita Vedanta

Religious career
- Teacher: Satyapriya Tirtha
- Successor: Satyasandha Tirtha
- Disciples: Satyasandha Tirtha, Satyavara Tirtha, Satyadharma Tirtha, Satyasankalpa Tirtha

Satyabodha Tirtha (Śrī Satya-bodha Tīrtha) (c. 1710 - c. 1783) was an Indian philosopher, scholar, yogi, mystic and saint. He was the 25th pontiff of Uttaradi Math and served the pontificate from March 1744 - 9 March 1783. Satyabodha Tirtha was a great yogi and was honoured by both Hindu and Muslim rulers of his time. Satyabodha Tirtha enjoyed a good fame as a miracle-man. Almost all the princes of the South India used to worship him and were his ardent disciples. Murari Rao of Gooty, Raghoji Bhosale and Fateh Singh Rao Gaekwad, were his great disciples. Satyabodha Tirtha Swamiji's mission of peace has played a prominent role during this time. He earned a reputation as the greatest of Madhva saints of his time for his un-rivaled scholarship, miraculous achievements and dynamism as the pontiff of the Uttaradi Math. So many were his achievements and so well was he liked, admired and respected by people of all castes and creeds, rich and poor, that the Uttaradi Math (where Satyabodha's Brindavana is present) in Savanur got the name as Satyabodha Math after him. Satyabodha Tirtha is believed to be the incarnation of Markandeya.

== Biography ==
Satyabodha Tirtha was born in Raichur, which is located between the Krishna and Tungabhadra rivers in the Indian state of Karnataka. Most of the information about his life is derived from the hagiography Satyabodha Vijaya written by Kanchi Vadiraj Achar. Born in 1710 into a traditional Deshastha Madhva Brahmin household, he was named Ramacharya. His father's name was Hariyacharya and mother's name was Aralabai. He was believed to be an avatar of Markhandeya rishi. He started studying shastras at the age of eight. The name conferred on him when he became the head of the Uttaradi Math monastery was Satyabodha Tirtha. Upon assuming the pontificate of the Uttaradi Mutt, he built a Brindavana to his guru at Mana Madurai and performed an aradhana in his honour. Satyabodha Tirtha travelled extensively all over India, winning over adversaries in philosophical, scholarly discussions, thereby acquiring shishyas and considerable wealth, landed properties and tamrapatras from kings and nawabs.

=== Peace treatise between two Kings ===
Satyabodha Tirtha has played a prominent part in the history of India. Once it so happened that Murari Rao of Gooty was occupying the Fort of Trichanapalli. Nizam-ul-mulk had put a seize to this fort in order to get back this fort. He was unsuccessful though he tried it for 3 months. Then the Nizam was told that if Satyabodha Swami were brought to Trichanappally from Ramanathpur and kept in jail, Murari Rao who was an ardent devotee would come out of the fort and yield. Satyabodha Tirtha brought about treaties between these two Warring Kings and established peace in the Country.

== In culture ==
Satyabodha Vijaya is a kavya of twentyone sargas written by Kanchi Vadirajacharya who was his disciple. The Mahakavya describes Satyabodha's life in detail. He was a saint of marvellous powers, his life is full of thrilling events. Let alone Hindus, even Mohammedans worshipped him with great reverence, Nawab of Ramnad, Nawab of Savanur and many other Muslim princes felt it an honour to be puppets in his hands. There is also another work known as Guru Katha Kalpa Taru which also gives details about Satyabodha.

== Bibliography ==
- Rao, C. R. (1984). Srimat Uttaradi Mutt: Moola Maha Samsthana of Srimadjagadguru Madhvacharya.
- Sharma, B. N. Krishnamurti (2000). A History of the Dvaita School of Vedānta and Its Literature, Vol 1. 3rd Edition. Motilal Banarsidass (2008 Reprint). ISBN 978-8120815759.
- Glasenapp, Helmuth von (1992). Madhva's Philosophy of the Viṣṇu Faith. Dvaita Vedanta Studies and Research Foundation.
- Chitnis, Krishnaji Nageshrao (1994), Glimpses of Maratha Socio-economic History, Atlantic Publishers & Dist, ISBN 9788171563470
- Chitnis, Krishnaji Nageshrao (2000), The Nawabs of Savanur, Atlantic Publishers & Dist, ISBN 9788171565214
- Kulakarni, A. Rā; Nayeem, M. A. (2000), History of Modern Deccan, 1720/1724-1948: Political and administrative aspects, Abul Kalam Azad Oriental Research Institute
- Ritti, P. S. (1961). Saint of Savanur.
