= Savanur State =

Princely state of British India

Coordinates: 14.967°N 75.35°E

Savanur State ಸವಣೂರ ಸಂಸ್ಥಾನ
- Princely State of British India
- 1680–1948
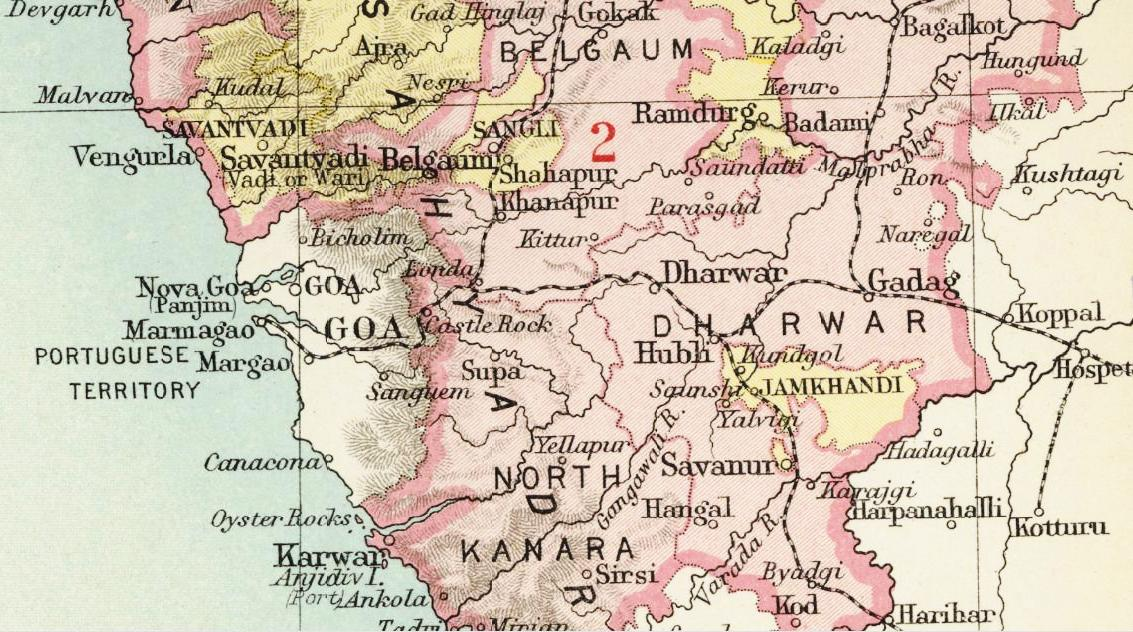
- Savanur State in the Imperial Gazetteer of India
- Area
  - 1901: 189 km^{2} (73 sq mi)
- Population
  - 1901: 18,446
- History
  - Established: 1680
  - Independence of India: 1948
Preceded by	Succeeded by
Maratha Empire	India
- Today part of: Karnataka, India

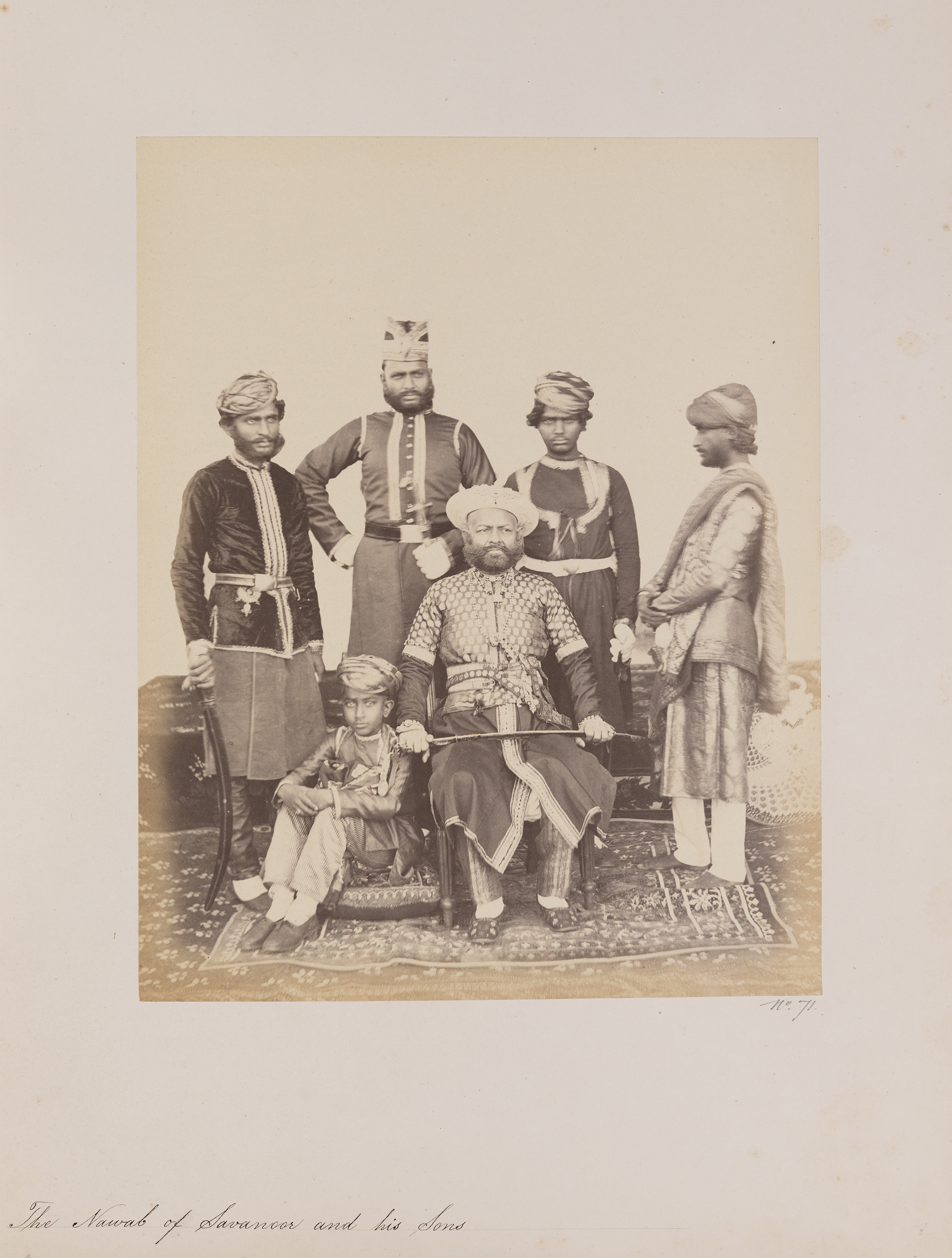
The Nawab of Savanur and his sons ca. 1855-1862

Savanur State, Nawab of Savanur was one of the princely states in British India. The last ruler of the state acceded to the Dominion of India on 8 March 1948, becoming part of the Bombay State. Later in 1956, it transferred to Mysore State in what is now Karnataka.

Savanur is also famous for Baobab trees planted there in ancient times. It is locally called Dodda Hunise Mara.

== History ==
The ancestor of the founding dynasty had migrated to India near Delhi in the reign of Timur. Two centuries later, during the reign of Shah Jahan, Ragati Bahlol Khan migrated from Northern India to the Deccan, where he was granted a Jagir. His grandson, Abul Karim Khan, was prominent in the court politics of Bijapur. The descendant of this family founded the Savanur state.

The name Savanur is said to have come from the fact that it was established in the Hindu month of Shravan, and hence the name Savanur. The state faced attacks from Hyder Ali in 1763 and Tipu Sultan in 1786. After the collapse of the Maratha Empire in 1818, following the Third Anglo-Maratha War, Savanur accepted protection from British East India Company and became a British protectorate.

The Nawabs of Savanur were tolerant of all religions and donated regularly to several Hindu temples and mutts. Betel leaves, jowar and cotton were the principal exports of the Savanur state. The Nawabs also had cordial relationship with the Dvaita mutt associated with Sri Satyabodhatirtha.

=== After independence ===
One of the Palace of Nawabs named Majid Castle (used by Abdul Majid II) is currently used as the Taluk Panchayath Office and the palace was used as a Tehsildar office and court. The key person of Gokak agitation, Vinayaka Krishna Gokak hailed from Savanur.

== See also ==
- List of Sunni Muslim dynasties
- Pashtun diaspora
- Political integration of India
