= Betadur =

- Village
- Location in Karnataka, India Betadur (India)
- Coordinates: 14.58264°N 75.45929°E
- Country: India
- State: Karnataka
- District: Dharwad

Government
  - Type: Panchayat raj
  - Body: Gram panchayat

Population (2011)
  - Total: 4,497

Languages
  - Official: Kannada
- Time zone: UTC+5:30 (IST)
- PIN: 581207
- ISO 3166 code: IN-KA
- Vehicle registration: KA
- Website: karnataka.gov.in

Betadur is a village in Dharwad district of Karnataka, India. It is located in the Kundgol taluk.

== Demographics ==
As of the 2011 Census of India there were 900 households in Betadur and a total population of 4,497 consisting of 2,307 males and 2,190 females. There were 548 children ages 0–6.
