= Kamadolli =

- village
- Country: India
- State: Karnataka
- District: Dharwad
- Talukas: Kundgol

Government
  - Type: Panchayat raj
  - Body: Gram panchayat

Population (2011)
  - Total: 7,931

Languages
  - Official: Kannada
- Time zone: UTC+5:30 (IST)
- ISO 3166 code: IN-KA
- Vehicle registration: KA
- Website: karnataka.gov.in

Kamadolli is a village in the southern state of Karnataka, India. It is located in the Kundgol taluk of Dharwad district in Karnataka. It is located about 30 km from the city of Hubli and about 200 km from the city of Panjim in Goa.

== Demographics ==
As of the 2011 Census of India there were 1,636 households in Kamadolli and a total population of 7,931 consisting of 4,027 males and 3,904 females. There were 400 children ages 0-6.

== See also ==
- Dharwad
- Districts of Karnataka
