= Satyadharma Tirtha =

Scholar and poet

Sri Satyadharma Tirtha

Personal life
- Born: Navaratna Purushottamacharya; 1743 Savanur, Haveri district, Karnataka, India
- Died: 1830 (aged 86–87) Holehonnur, Shimoga district, Karnataka, India

Religious life
- Religion: Hinduism
- Order: Vedanta (Uttaradi Math)
- Philosophy: Dvaita Vedanta

Religious career
- Teacher: Satyavara Tirtha (Ashrama Guru); Satyabodha Tirtha (Vidya Guru)
- Predecessor: Satyavara Tirtha
- Successor: Śrī Satya-saṅkalpa Tīrtha
- Disciples: Satyasankalpa Tirtha

Satyadharma Tirtha (c. 1743 – c. 1830) was a Hindu philosopher, scholar, theologian and saint belonging to the Dvaita order of Vedanta. He was the 28th abbot of Uttaradi Math since Madhvacharya from 1797-1830.

== Life ==
Satyadharma Tirtha was born in 1743 in Savanur, Haveri district, Karnataka. His purvashrama name was Navaratna Purushottamacharya. He belongs to Navaratna family of scholars, who belongs to Deshastha Madhwa Brahmin family. Satyadharma Tirtha was a contemporary and guru of Dewan Purnaiah.

== Works ==
There have been 27 works accredited to Satyadharma Tirtha, 10 of which are commentaries on the works of Hindu philosopher's of Dvaita order, especially Jayatirtha.

| Name | Description |
|---|---|
| Tattvasaṁkhyāna Tippani | Summary of Tattvasaṁkhyā of Jayatirtha |
| Namaka Chamaka Vyakhyana | Gloss on Namaka Chamaka |
| Shrimad Bhagavata Tippani | Summary of Bhagavata Tatparya Nirnaya of Madhvacharya |
| Viratparva Tippani | Summary of Virata Parva of Mahabharata |
| Udyoga Parva Tippani | Summary of Udyoga Parva of Mahabharata |
| Ramayana Tippani | A gloss on "Valmiki Ramayana" |
| Virahimodasudhavyakhyan | Gloss on Virahimoda Sudha |
| Tarangini Shloka Vyakhya | Gloss on Tarangini Shloka |
| Vishnutatvanirnaya Teeka tippani | Commentary on Jayatirtha's Viṣṇutattvanirṇayaṭikā |
| Bhasyadipika Yukti Vaatya | A refutation work on Bhasyadipika of Jagannatha Tirtha |
| Ganga Lahari | A hymn in praise of Ganga |
| Sri Lakshmi Narasimha Stotra | A hymn in praise of Lord Lakshmi Narasimha |
| Nithya Samsari Lingabhanga Vichara | A theological tract refuting a schismatic view that even the class of "Nitya Samsari" souls have to undergo destruction of their "Linga-deha" |
| Navagraha Stotra | A short hymn on Navagraha |
| Vadiraj Stuti | A hymn in praise of Vadiraja Tirtha |
| Sri Satyavara Stotra | A hymn in praise of his guru Satyavara Tirtha |

Miscellaneous works:

- Kavikanthamani
- Yaduvaracharitamruta Lahari
- Bhagavadbhajanam
- Hitopadesha
- Sri Rangeshwara Srungaralahari
- Geetamahatmyasarasangraha
- Antrlapikah
- Barirlapikah
- Gurvashtakam

== Bibliography ==
- Rajaram, N S (2019). The Vanished Raj A Memoir of Princely India. Prism Books Private Limited. ISBN 978-9388478113.
- Sharma, B. N. Krishnamurti (2000). A History of the Dvaita School of Vedānta and Its Literature, Vol 1. 3rd Edition. Motilal Banarsidass (2008 Reprint). ISBN 978-8120815759.
- Raghavan, V. (1975). International Sanskrit Conference, Volume 1, Part 1. The Ministry.
- Rao, C. R. (1984). Srimat Uttaradi Mutt: Moola Maha Samsthana of Srimadjagadguru Madhvacharya.
- Krishna, Daya (2002). Developments in Indian philosophy from Eighteenth century onwards: classical and western. Project of History of Indian Science, Philosophy, and Culture. ISBN 9788187586081.
