= Suranagi =

- village
- Country: India
- State: Karnataka
- District: Gadag
- Talukas: Shirhatti

Government
  - Body: Gram panchayat

Population (2011)
  - Total: 6,657

Languages
  - Official: Kannada
- Time zone: UTC+5:30 (IST)
- PIN: 582112
- ISO 3166 code: IN-KA
- Vehicle registration: KA
- Nearest city: Hubli
- Climate: cool and normal hot (Köppen)
- Website: www.surnagi.com

Suranagi is a village in the southern state of Karnataka, India. It is located in the Laxmeshwar taluk of Gadag district in Karnataka.

== Demographics ==
As of 2011 India census, Suranagi had a population of 6,657 with 3,415 males and 3,242 females.

== See also ==
- Districts of Karnataka
