= Ingalagi, Kundgol =

Ingalagi
- Village
- Location within Karnataka Location within India
- Coordinates: 15°7′18.36″N 75°14′7.07″E
- Country: India
- State: Karnataka
- District: Dharwad district
- Taluk: Kundgol

Government
  - Type: Panchayat raj
  - Body: Gram panchayat

Population (2011)
  - Total: 4,224

Languages
  - Official: Kannada
- Time zone: UTC+5:30 (IST)
- PIN: 580 028
- Telephone code: 08304
- ISO 3166 code: IN-KA
- Vehicle registration: KA 25 & KA 63
- Website: karnataka.gov.in

Ingalagi is a village in the Kundgol taluk of Dharwad district in the Indian state of Karnataka. Ingalagi is 30 km from Hubli and Shishuvinahala is 6 km from here.

== Demographics ==
As of the 2011 Census of India there were 859 households in Ingalagi and a total population of 4,224 consisting of 2,178 males and 2,046 females. There were 450 children ages 0-6.

== See also ==
- Kundgol
- Shishuvinahala
- Hubli
- Dharwad
- Karnataka
