= M. R. Patil (politician) =

Indian politician (born 1962)

M. R. Patil (born 1962) is an Indian politician from Karnataka. He is an MLA from Kundgol Assembly constituency in Dharwad district. He won the 2023 Karnataka Legislative Assembly election representing Bharatiya Janata Party.

== Early life and education ==
Patil is from Kundgol, Dharwad district. His father is Rayanagouda. He completed his graduation in commerce in 1983 at J.G Commerce College, Hubli.

== Career ==
Patil won from Kundgol Assembly constituency representing Bharatiya Janata Party in the 2023 Karnataka Legislative Assembly election. He polled 76,105 votes and defeated his nearest rival, Kusuma Shivalli of Indian National Congress, by a margin of 35,341 votes.
