= Kundgol Assembly constituency =

Legislative Assembly constituency in Karnataka, India

Coordinates: 15.26°N 75.25°E

Kundgol
- Constituency No. 70 for the Karnataka Legislative Assembly

Constituency details
- Country: India
- Region: South India
- State: Karnataka
- District: Dharwad
- Lok Sabha constituency: Dharwad
- Established: 1956
- Total electors: 233,835
- Reservation: None

Member of Legislative Assembly
- 16th Karnataka Legislative Assembly
- Incumbent M. R. Patil
- Party: Bharatiya Janata Party
- Elected year: 2023
- Preceded by: Kusuma Shivalli

Kundgol Assembly constituency is one of the 224 assembly constituencies in Karnataka in India. It is one of the eight constituencies which make up Dharwad Lok Sabha constituency.

M. R. Patil is the current MLA from Kundgol.

== Members of the Legislative Assembly ==
Election	Member	Party
1957	Timmanna Kenchappa Kamble	Indian National Congress
1962	Timmanna Kenchappa Kamble	Indian National Congress
1967	B. S. Rayappa	Independent politician
1972	R. V. Rangangowda	Indian National Congress
1978	Katagi Mahadevappa Shivappa	Indian National Congress
1983	Kubihal Veerappa Shekarappa	Indian National Congress
1985	Uppin Basappa Andaneppa	Janata Party
1989	Govindappa Hanumantappa Jutal	Indian National Congress
1994	Akki Mallikarjuna Sahadevappa	Janata Dal
1999	Shivalli Channabasappa Satyappa	Independent politician
2004	Akki Mallikarjuna Sahadevappa	Janata Dal
2008	Chikkanagoudra Siddanagoud Ishwaragod	Bharatiya Janata Party
2013	C. S. Shivalli	Indian National Congress
2018	C. S. Shivalli	Indian National Congress
2019 By-election	Kusuma Shivalli	Indian National Congress
2023	M. R. Patil	Bharatiya Janata Party

== Election results ==
=== Assembly Election 2023 ===
2023 Karnataka Legislative Assembly election : Kundgol
Party	Candidate	Votes	%	±%
BJP	M. R. Patil	76,105	49.07	▲0.07
INC	Kusuma Shivalli	40,764	26.28	▼23.76
Independent	C. S. Ishwaragoud	30,425	19.62	New
JD(S)	Hazratali Shaikh Jodamani	4,304	2.78	New
NOTA	None of the above	1,001	0.65	▲0.04
Margin of victory		35,341	22.79	▲21.76
Turnout		155,406	83.18	▲0.95
Total valid votes		155,086		
Registered electors		186,825		▼1.52
BJP gain from INC		Swing	▼0.97	

=== Assembly By-election 2019 ===
2019 Karnataka Legislative Assembly by-election : Kundgol
Party	Candidate	Votes	%	±%
INC	Kusuma Shivalli	77,640	50.04	▲6.07
BJP	C. S. Ishwaragoud	76,039	49.00	▲5.46
NOTA	None of the above	939	0.61	▼0.09
Margin of victory		1,601	1.03	▲0.60
Turnout		155,989	82.23	▲3.49
Total valid votes		155,167		
Registered electors		189,700		▲1.17
INC hold		Swing	▲6.07	

=== Assembly Election 2018 ===
2018 Karnataka Legislative Assembly election : Kundgol
Party	Candidate	Votes	%	±%
INC	C. S. Shivalli	64,871	43.97	▲4.36
BJP	C. S. Ishwaragoud	64,237	43.54	▲25.77
JD(U)	Hajaratali A. Shekh Jodamani	7,318	4.96	New
JD(S)	Akki Mallikarjuna Sahadevappa	6,280	4.26	▼7.48
NOTA	None of the above	1,032	0.70	New
Margin of victory		634	0.43	▼15.41
Turnout		147,644	78.74	▲1.66
Total valid votes		147,524		
Registered electors		187,513		▲11.07
INC hold		Swing	▲4.36	

=== Assembly Election 2013 ===
2013 Karnataka Legislative Assembly election : Kundgol
Party	Candidate	Votes	%	±%
INC	C. S. Shivalli	52,690	39.61	▲6.33
KJP	Chikkanagoudra Siddanagoud Ishwaragod	31,618	23.77	New
BJP	M. R. Patil	23,641	17.77	▼21.26
JD(S)	Akki Mallikarjuna Sahadevappa	15,613	11.74	▼5.45
Independent	Virupakshagouda Naganagouda Fakkiragoudra	2,309	1.74	New
BSRCP	Veerupakshappa Kallimani	869	0.65	New
Margin of victory		21,072	15.84	▲10.09
Turnout		130,131	77.08	▲5.53
Total valid votes		133,018		
Registered electors		168,831		▲8.85
INC gain from BJP		Swing	▲0.58	

=== Assembly Election 2008 ===
2008 Karnataka Legislative Assembly election : Kundgol
Party	Candidate	Votes	%	±%
BJP	Chikkanagoudra Siddanagoud Ishwaragod	43,307	39.03	New
INC	C. S. Shivalli	36,931	33.28	▲20.60
JD(S)	Siddanagoudra Parvatagouda Chanaveeranagouda	19,077	17.19	▲13.45
SP	Patil Sureshagouda Chanabasanagouda	3,305	2.98	New
BSP	Nadaf Hazarathsaheb Lattesab	2,236	2.02	New
Independent	Maruti Madevappa Vaddar	1,926	1.74	New
Independent	Naikar Parameshappa Basappa	964	0.87	New
Rashtriya Hindustan Sena Karnataka	Gangadhara Shivappa Dharennavar	943	0.85	New
Independent	Chikkappa Ningappa Shyagoti	793	0.71	New
Margin of victory		6,376	5.75	▲1.31
Turnout		110,969	71.55	▲2.57
Total valid votes		110,958		
Registered electors		155,099		▲11.84
BJP gain from JD(U)		Swing	▲9.53	

=== Assembly Election 2004 ===
2004 Karnataka Legislative Assembly election : Kundgol
Party	Candidate	Votes	%	±%
JD(U)	Akki Mallikarjuna Sahadevappa	28,184	29.50	▲6.31
Independent	C. S. Shivalli	23,942	25.06	New
INC	Arvind Mahadevappa Katagi	12,110	12.68	▼8.32
Independent	Kurtakoti Manjunathagouda Prabugouda	7,068	7.40	New
Independent	Shivanand Dyavappa Bentur	4,200	4.40	New
JD(S)	Govindappa Hanumantappa Jutal	3,569	3.74	▼8.81
Independent	Parasappa Rayappa Chalawadi	2,900	3.04	New
JP	Kobbayyanavar Rajkashekarayya Chanbasayya	2,572	2.69	New
Independent	Mudigouda Shankaragouda Mallanagouda	2,022	2.12	New
Margin of victory		4,242	4.44	▼7.63
Turnout		95,654	68.98	▼5.51
Total valid votes		95,528		
Registered electors		138,679		▲10.22
JD(U) gain from Independent		Swing	▼5.76	

=== Assembly Election 1999 ===
1999 Karnataka Legislative Assembly election : Kundgol
Party	Candidate	Votes	%	±%
Independent	Shivalli Channabasappa Satyappa	30,692	35.26	New
JD(U)	Akki Mallikarjuna Sahadevappa	20,184	23.19	New
INC	Govindappa Hanumantappa Jutal	18,278	21.00	▼0.88
JD(S)	Patil Ranganagouda Ninganagouda	10,922	12.55	New
Independent	Kubihal Veerappa Shekarappa	2,563	2.94	New
Independent	Kamadoli Channappa Mallappa	1,858	2.13	New
Independent	Shanthala Patil Basavaraj	1,399	1.61	New
BJP	Yaraguppi Shivappa Ningappa	1,137	1.31	▼4.21
Margin of victory		10,508	12.07	▼5.49
Turnout		93,716	74.49	▲3.30
Total valid votes		87,033		
Rejected ballots		6,683	7.13	▲4.32
Registered electors		125,817		▲11.32
Independent gain from JD		Swing	▼6.75	

=== Assembly Election 1994 ===
1994 Karnataka Legislative Assembly election : Kundgol
Party	Candidate	Votes	%	±%
JD	M. S. Akki	32,707	42.01	▼1.77
INC	C. S. Shivalli	19,034	24.45	New
INC	C. H. Juttal	17,034	21.88	▼29.59
BJP	R. V. Desai	4,295	5.52	New
KRRS	B. F. Kudawakkal	1,704	2.19	New
Independent	V. N. Fakkeergoudar	1,528	1.96	New
Margin of victory		13,673	17.56	▲9.86
Turnout		80,463	71.19	▲0.39
Total valid votes		77,860		
Rejected ballots		2,264	2.81	▼3.05
Registered electors		113,022		▲5.01
JD gain from INC		Swing	▼9.46	

=== Assembly Election 1989 ===
1989 Karnataka Legislative Assembly election : Kundgol
Party	Candidate	Votes	%	±%
INC	Govindappa Hanumantappa Jutal	36,925	51.47	▲17.79
JD	Ravasaheb Veerabasavantrao Desai	31,404	43.78	New
JP	Devraj Tippannavar	1,652	2.30	New
Independent	Suragimath Sangayya Basayya	753	1.05	New
Kranti Sabha	Bapugouda Iranagouda Patil	489	0.68	New
Margin of victory		5,521	7.70	▼2.38
Turnout		76,199	70.80	▼4.11
Total valid votes		71,735		
Rejected ballots		4,464	5.86	▲3.84
Registered electors		107,633		▲23.31
INC gain from JP		Swing	▲7.70	

=== Assembly Election 1985 ===
1985 Karnataka Legislative Assembly election : Kundgol
Party	Candidate	Votes	%	±%
JP	Uppin Basappa Andaneppa	28,038	43.77	▲1.34
INC	Kubihal Veerappa Shekarappa	21,578	33.68	▼20.75
Independent	N. Basavaraj	12,754	19.91	New
Independent	Kadadevaramath Basavannayya Ningayya	778	1.21	New
Independent	Ranganagouda Timanagouda Patil Kulkarni	445	0.69	New
Margin of victory		6,460	10.08	▼1.92
Turnout		65,386	74.91	▲7.72
Total valid votes		64,063		
Rejected ballots		1,323	2.02	▼1.13
Registered electors		87,286		▲7.16
JP gain from INC		Swing	▼10.66	

=== Assembly Election 1983 ===
1983 Karnataka Legislative Assembly election : Kundgol
Party	Candidate	Votes	%	±%
INC	Kubihal Veerappa Shekarappa	28,848	54.43	▲53.07
JP	Mulkipatil Shankargouda Ramanagouda	22,489	42.43	▲12.93
Independent	Patil Parameshwaragouda Venkanagouda	830	1.57	New
Independent	Mulagund Basappa Ningagappa	536	1.01	New
Margin of victory		6,359	12.00	▼19.24
Turnout		54,727	67.19	▼10.25
Total valid votes		53,002		
Rejected ballots		1,725	3.15	▼0.15
Registered electors		81,454		▲6.58
INC gain from INC(I)		Swing	▼6.31	

=== Assembly Election 1978 ===
1978 Karnataka Legislative Assembly election : Kundgol
Party	Candidate	Votes	%	±%
INC(I)	Katagi Mahadevappa Shivappa	34,761	60.74	New
JP	Munir Divanasab Haidarsab	16,884	29.50	New
Independent	Umachagi Linganagouda Basanagouda	2,385	4.17	New
Independent	Bisirotti Fakkirappa Fakkirappa	1,300	2.27	New
Independent	Patil Goudappagouda Shivanagouda	796	1.39	New
INC	Shettar Channabasappa Gurushiddappa	779	1.36	▼59.31
Margin of victory		17,877	31.24	▲9.91
Turnout		59,186	77.44	▼1.41
Total valid votes		57,232		
Rejected ballots		1,954	3.30	▲3.30
Registered electors		76,427		▲36.97
INC(I) gain from INC		Swing	▲0.07	

=== Assembly Election 1972 ===
1972 Mysore State Legislative Assembly election : Kundgol
Party	Candidate	Votes	%	±%
INC	R. V. Rangangowda	25,694	60.67	▲31.48
INC(O)	B. S. Rayappa	16,659	39.33	New
Margin of victory		9,035	21.33	▼12.69
Turnout		43,994	78.85	▲10.22
Total valid votes		42,353		
Registered electors		55,798		▲11.81
INC gain from Independent		Swing	▼2.54	

=== Assembly Election 1967 ===
1967 Mysore State Legislative Assembly election : Kundgol
Party	Candidate	Votes	%	±%
Independent	B. S. Rayappa	20,291	63.21	New
INC	K. T. Kenchappa	9,371	29.19	▼14.96
Independent	P. C. Hanamantagouda	2,439	7.60	New
Margin of victory		10,920	34.02	▲28.03
Turnout		34,252	68.63	▲5.96
Total valid votes		32,101		
Registered electors		49,906		▼3.85
Independent gain from INC		Swing	▲19.06	

=== Assembly Election 1962 ===
1962 Mysore State Legislative Assembly election : Kundgol
Party	Candidate	Votes	%	±%
INC	Timmanna Kenchappa Kamble	13,265	44.15	▼9.88
Independent	Somanna Rayappa Bommai	11,465	38.16	New
SWA	Chanaveerappa Shankarappa Shiggaon	5,315	17.69	New
Margin of victory		1,800	5.99	▼2.07
Turnout		32,530	62.67	▲0.26
Total valid votes		30,045		
Registered electors		51,904		▲10.64
INC hold		Swing	▼9.88	

=== Assembly Election 1957 ===
1957 Mysore State Legislative Assembly election : Kundgol
Party	Candidate	Votes	%	±%
INC	Kambali Timmanna Kenchappa	15,819	54.03	New
Independent	Nadger Kenchanagouda Ranganagouda	13,458	45.97	New
Margin of victory		2,361	8.06	
Turnout		29,277	62.41	
Total valid votes		29,277		
Registered electors		46,912		
INC win (new seat)				
