= C. S. Shivalli =

Indian politician (1962–2019)

Minister of Municipalities and Local bodies of Karnataka
- In office 22 December 2018 – 22 March 2019
- Preceded by: Eshwara Khandre
- Succeeded by: M. T. B. Nagaraj

Member of the Karnataka Legislative Assembly from Kundgol
- In office 2018 – 22 March 2019
- Succeeded by: Kusuma Shivalli
- Constituency: Kundgol constituency

Personal details
- Born: 6 May 1962 Shelawadi
- Died: 22 March 2019 (aged 56) Karnataka Institute of Medical Sciences
- Spouse: Kusuma Shivalli

Channabasappa Sathyappa Shivalli (6 May 1962 - 22 March 2019) was an Indian politician and member of the Indian National Congress from the state of Karnataka who served as Minister of Municipalities and Local bodies of Karnataka from 22 December 2018 to 22 March 2019. Shivalli was the Minister in-charge of Municipal administration.
