= Kalas, Karnataka =

Kalas
- village
- Interactive map of Kalas
- Coordinates: 15.098262°N 75.406101°E
- Country: India
- State: Karnataka
- District: Dharwad
- Talukas: Kundgol

Government
  - Type: Panchayat raj
  - Body: Gram Panchayat

Area
  - Total: 23.863 km^{2} (9.214 sq mi)
- Elevation: 636 m (2,087 ft)

Population (2011)
  - Total: 7,219
  - Density: 302.5/km^{2} (783.5/sq mi)

Languages
  - Official: Dharwad
- Time zone: UTC+5:30 (IST)
- PIN: 581107
- Vehicle registration: 25
- Nearest city: Hubli
- Lok Sabha constituency: Grama Panchayat Kalas
- Website: http://panchamitra.kar.nic.in/MainMenu.aspx?gp=1513004001&gpname=%E0%B2%95%E0%B2%B3%E0%B2%B8

Kalas is a village in the southern state of Karnataka, India. It is located in the Kundgol taluk of Dharwad district in Karnataka. This is the native place of Guru Govindabhatta, who is the guru of Santha Shishunal Sharif. Today we can find Samadhi of Guru Govindabhatta here. His aradhana (death anniversary) takes place every year during summer.

It belongs to Belgaum Division. It is located 67 km to the east of the district headquarters Dharwada, 28 km from Kundgolm and 390 km from the state capital of Bangalore. Kalas' pin code is 581107 and its postal head office is Gudgeri.

Kalas is surrounded by Shiggaon Taluk towards the west, Kundgol Taluk towards the north, Shirahatti Taluk towards the east, and Haveri Taluk towards the south. Lakshmeshwar, Savanur, Shiggaon, Hubli are the cities near Kalas.

== Demographics ==
As of the 2011 Census of India there were 1,406 households in Kalas and a total population of 7,219 consisting of 3,747 males and 3,472 females. There were 872 children ages 0–6.

== How to reach Kalas ==
By Road Lakshmeshwar is the Nearest Town to Kalas. Lakshmeshwar is 11 km from Kalas. Road connectivity is there from Lakshmeshwar to Kalas. By Rail Kalas Halt Rail Way Station, Gudgeri Rail Way Station are the very nearby railway stations to Kalas. Also you can consider railway Stations from Near By town Lakshmeshwar. Kalas Halt Rail Way Station are the railway Stations near to Lakshmeshwar. You can reach from Lakshmeshwar to Kalas by road after. However Hubli Jn Rail Way Station is a major railway station 44 km from Kalas.

== Colleges near Kalas ==
Fakkirappa Chennabasappa Mattur Govt Pu And Degree College Address : F.c.m Govt Pu And Degree College station Road

Smt. Kamal & Sri Venkappa M. Angadi College of Engineering & technology. Laxmeshwar Address:Savanur road, Laxmeshwar

BCN Polytechnic Laxmeshwar

Govt P.U college Laxmeshwar.

== Schools in Kalas ==
New High School, Kalas

Navodaya Convent Higher Primary School, Kalas

Govt. Kannada Higher Primary Boys and Girls School, Kalas

Govt. Kannada Lower Primary Boys and Girls School, Kalas.

== See also ==
- Dharwad
- Districts of Karnataka
