= Madanur Vishnu Tirtha =

Hindu seer and scholar

- Brindavana of Jayatirthacharya alias Vishnu Tirtha at Madanur near Koppal

Personal life
- Born: Adavi Jayatirthacharya; 1756 Siddhapur (near Savanur), Karnataka
- Died: 1806 (aged 49–50) Madanuru (near Koppal)

Religious life
- Religion: Hinduism
- Philosophy: Dvaita Vedanta

Religious career
- Teacher: Satyavara Tirtha

Vishnu Tirtha (born, Adavi Jayatirthacharya; popularly referred as Madanur Vishnu Tirtha) (1756–1806) was a Hindu seer, scholar, writer, philosopher and exponent of Madhvacharya's works and Dvaita school of thought.

== Personal life ==
According to reports, Jayatirthacharya was born in Siddhapur near Savanur and taken sanyasa from his guru, Satyavara Tirtha. Jayatirthacharya was taken so that he could travel on a pilgrimage to Vrindavana and have entered Vrindavana at Madanur, six miles from Koppal, where his Brindavana is also situated.

== Notable scholarly works ==
Vishnu Tirtha wrote more than nineteen books and among his works, few noted scholarly works are :

- Bhagavata-Saroddhara – an anthology of 367 select verses from Bhagavata
- Ajnapatra
- Atmasukhabodhini
- Shodashi – a theological book
- Caturdashi – a theological book
- Adhyatma-rasaranjani – a book on stotra

== Bibliography ==
- Sharma, B. N. Krishnamurti (2000). A History of the Dvaita School of Vedānta and Its Literature, Vol 1. 3rd Edition. Motilal Banarsidass (2008 Reprint). ISBN 978-8120815759.
