= Gudgeri =

Gudageri
- Village
- Location within Karnataka Location within India
- Coordinates: 15°7′21″N 75°21′55″E
- Country: India
- State: Karnataka
- District: Dharwad district
- Taluk: Kundgol

Government
  - Type: Revenue dept.
  - Body: Village Accountant

Population (2011)
  - Total: 9,886

Languages
  - Official: Kannada
- Time zone: UTC+5:30 (IST)
- PIN: 581107
- ISO 3166 code: IN-KA
- Vehicle registration: KA 25 And KA 63
- Website: karnataka.gov.in

Gudgeri is a village in the Kundgol taluk of Dharwad district in the Indian state of Karnataka. It is located in the Kundgol taluk of Dharwad district in Karnataka.

== Village information ==
Gudgeri has train connectivity to Bangalore and Hubli. The village has road connectivity to Hubli, Lakshmeshwar, Savanur, Shiggaon and Haveri.

The village also has government primary health centre (PHC), government degree college, government PU college, government high school and primary school facilities.

== Demographics ==
As of the 2011 Census of India there were 2,183 households in Gudgeri and a total population of 9,886 consisting of 4,996 males and 4,890 females. There were 1,036 children ages 0-6.

== See also ==
- Shishuvinahala
- Lakshmeshwar
- Savanur
- Kundgol
- Dharwad
- Karnataka
