= Mumbai CSMT–Gadag Express =

Indian express train route

Mumbai Chhatrapati Shivaji Maharaj Terminus–Gadag Junction Express
Overview
- Service type: Express
- Current operator: Central Railway zone

Route
- Termini: Chhatrapati Shivaji Maharaj Terminus (CSMT); Gadag Junction (GDG)
- Stops: 9
- Distance travelled: 753 km (468 mi)
- Average journey time: 15h
- Service frequency: Daily (Note: Runs daily for every direction.)
- Train number: 11139/11140

On-board services
- Classes: AC 2 tier, AC 3 tier, Sleeper class, General Unreserved
- Seating arrangements: No
- Sleeping arrangements: Yes
- Catering facilities: On-board catering E-catering
- Observation facilities: ICF–CBC coaches
- Entertainment facilities: No
- Baggage facilities: No
- Other facilities: OBHS provided below the seats

Technical
- Track gauge: 1,676 mm (5 ft 6 in)
- Operating speed: 50 km/h (31 mph), including halts

The Mumbai Chhatrapati Shivaji Maharaj Terminus–Gadag Junction Express is an express train belonging to Central Railway zone, Mumbai CSMT Division that runs between Chhatrapati Shivaji Maharaj Terminus and Gadag Junction in India. It is currently being operated with 11139/11140 train numbers on six days a week basis.

== Service ==
- 11139/Mumbai Chhatrapati Shivaji Maharaj Terminus–Gadag Junction Express has average speed of 50 km/h and covers 753 km in 15h.
- 11140/Gadag Junction–Mumbai Chhatrapati Shivaji Maharaj Terminus Express has average speed of 49 km/h and covers 753 km in 15h 30min.

== Route and halts ==
The important halts of the train are:

- Chhatrapati Shivaji Maharaj Terminus
- Dadar
- Kalyan Junction
- Karjat
- Lonavala
- Pune Junction
- Kurduvadi Junction
- Solapur
- Bijapur
- Bagalkot Junction
- Gadag Junction

== Coach composition ==
The train has standard ICF–CBC rakes with max speed of 110 kmph. The train consists of 12 coaches:

- 1 First AC and AC II Tier
- 1 AC II Tier
- 1 AC III Tier
- 4 Sleeper coaches
- 3 General Unreserved
- 2 Seating cum Luggage Rack

== See also ==
- Chhatrapati Shivaji Maharaj Terminus
- Gadag Junction railway station
