= Kusuma Shivalli =

Indian politician

Member of Legislative Assembly
- In office 23 May 2019 – 13 May 2023
- Preceded by: C. S. Shivalli
- Succeeded by: M R Patil
- Constituency: Kundgol constituency

Personal details
- Born: 4 May 1971 (age 54) Adnur
- Party: Indian National Congress
- Spouse: C. S. Shivalli
- Occupation: Politician

Kusumavati Channabasappa Shivalli is an Indian politician who was the MLA from Kundgol constituency. She is a member of the Indian National Congress.

== Political career ==
She entered politics after the untimely death of her husband C. S. Shivalli. She was fielded by the Congress Working Committee as the party's candidate from Kundgol for the 23 May 2019 by elections in Karnataka. She won the election leading with 1601 votes. In 2023 Karnataka Legislative Assembly election, she lost from Kundgol to M R Patil of the BJP by a margin of 35,341 votes.
