= Satyasandha Tirtha =

Hindu guru

Sri Satyasandha Tirtha
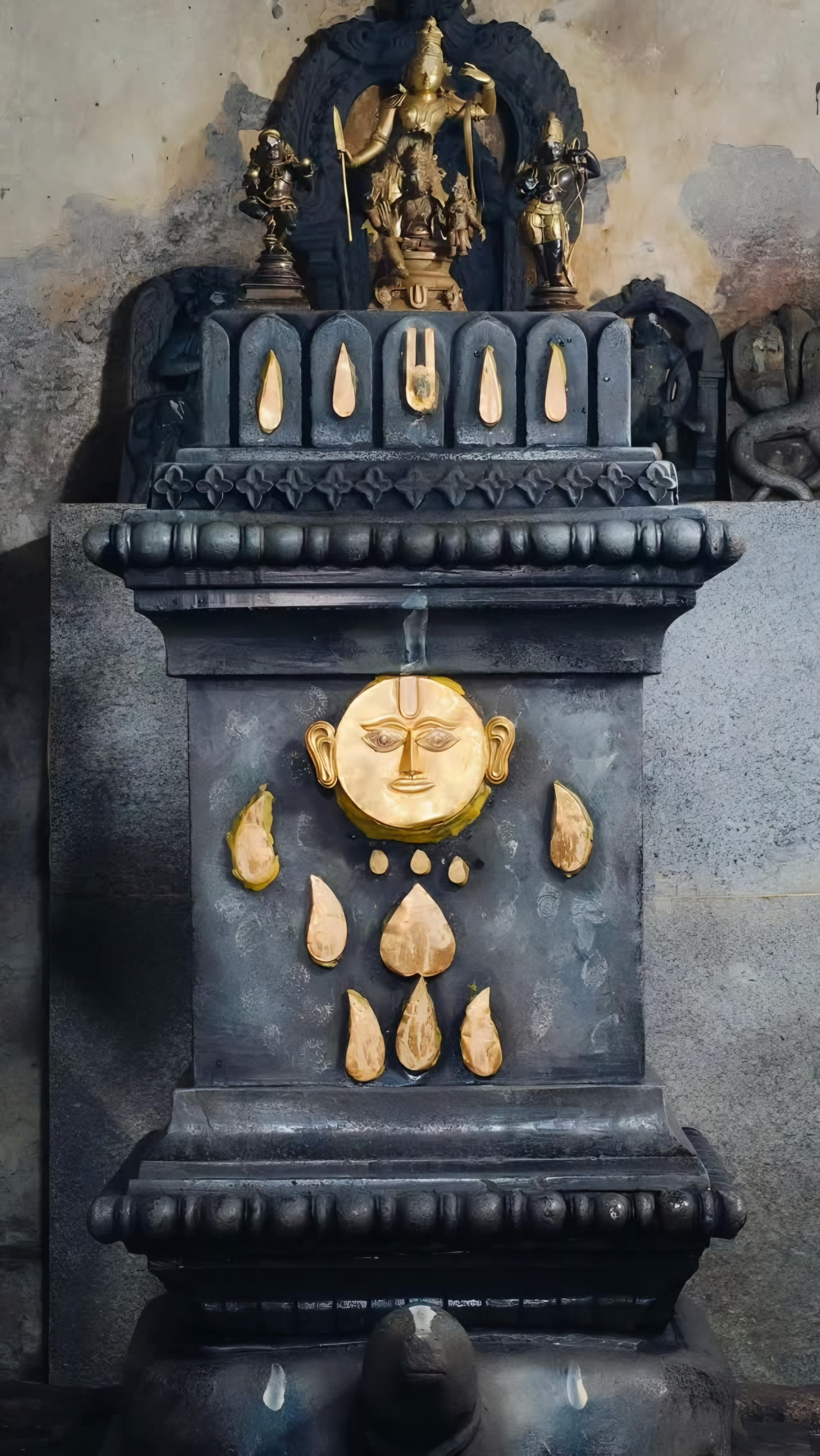
- Brindavana of Satyasandha Tirtha at Mahishi, Karnataka

Personal life
- Born: Haveri Ramacharya; 1733 Haveri (present-day Haveri district, Karnataka)
- Died: 1794 (aged 60–61) Mahishi (present-day Thirthahalli taluk, Shimoga district, Karnataka)
- Resting place: Mahishi

Religious life
- Religion: Hinduism
- Order: Vedanta (Uttaradi Math)
- Philosophy: Dvaita Vedanta

Religious career
- Teacher: Satyabodha Tirtha
- Successor: Satyavara Tirtha

Satyasandha Tirtha (Śrī Satya-sandha Tīrtha) (c.1733 - c.1794), was a Hindu philosopher, scholar, mystic and saint. He was the 26th pontiff of Uttaradi Math and served the pontificate from 1783 to 1794.

Most of the information about his life is derived from the classical biographical work, Sri Satyasandha Vijaya written by Koneratmaja.

Tirtha's works include Viṣṇusahasranāmabhāṣya, a commentary on Vishnu Sahasranama, Vishnu Stuti, a hymn to Vishnu and Krishnashtakam, a stotra consisting of 8 verses (ashtakam) in praise of Krishna.

== Bibliography ==
- Sharma, B. N. Krishnamurti (2000). A History of the Dvaita School of Vedānta and Its Literature, Vol 1. 3rd Edition. Motilal Banarsidass (2008 Reprint). ISBN 978-8120815759.
- Glasenapp, Helmuth von (1992). Madhva's Philosophy of the Viṣṇu Faith. Dvaita Vedanta Studies and Research Foundation.
- Gonda, Jan (1974), A History of Indian literature, Volume 9, Issues 1-4, Harrassowitz, ISBN 978-3447015608
- Bhatta, C. Panduranga; Samuel, G. John; Hikosaka, Shu (1997). Contribution of Karṇāṭaka to Sanskrit. Institute of Asian Studies.
- Upadhye, A. N. (1973). Journal of Indian History, Volume 51. Department of History, University of Kerala.
