= Hulkoti =

- village
- Location in Karnataka, India Hulkoti (India)
- Coordinates: 15°26′N 75°32′E
- Country: India
- State: Karnataka
- District: Gadag

Government
  - Type: Municipal corporation
  - Body: Nagar Palika

Languages
  - Official: Kannada
- Time zone: UTC+5:30 (IST)
- ISO 3166 code: IN-KA
- Vehicle registration: KA26
- Website: karnataka.gov.in

Hulkoti is a village in Gadag district of Karnataka state, India. The town is situated on the way from Hubli to Gadag road (NH-63. The village is known for the co-operative movement in Karnataka. Hulkoti gram panchayat (GP) in Gadag district has been ranked joint first in the Mission Antyodaya 2020. National survey conducted by the central rural development and panchayat raj ministry. This village of 11,794 residents is about 390 km from Bengaluru and shares the top spot with Sulthanpur and Yelkurthi, both in Telangana. It's also a model for other GPs in implementing government schemes and utilising funds effectively.

== Transportation ==
Hulkoti railway station is a railway station located on the Guntakal–Vasco da Gama line.
