= Adavi =

Adavi may refer to:

- Adavi, Kerala, a tourism place in Kerala, India
- Adavi, Maharashtra, a village in Maharashtra, India
- Adavi, Nigeria, a Local Government Area in Kogi State
- Agyaat or Adavi, a 2009 Indian Telugu-language film
- Adavi (film), a 2020 Indian Tamil-language film
