= Binkadakatti railway station =

Railway station in Karnataka

Binkadakatti

General information
- Location: National Highway 63, Binkadakatti, Gadag district, Karnatak; India
- Coordinates: 15°26′12″N 75°35′44″E
- Elevation: 654 metres (2,146 ft)
- System: Indian Railways station
- Owner: Indian Railways
- Operator: South Western Railway zone
- Line: Guntakal–Vasco da Gama line
- Platforms: 2
- Tracks: Double Electric-Line

Construction
- Structure type: Standard (on ground)

Other information
- Status: Functioning
- Station code: BKIT
- Zone(s): South Western Railway zone
- Division(s): Hubballi

Services
Preceding station	Indian Railways	Following station
Gadag Junction towards ?	South Western Railway zone Guntakal–Vasco da Gama section	Hulkoti towards ?
Location
- Interactive map

Binkadakatti railway station is a railway station located on the Guntakal–Vasco da Gama line operated by the South Western Railway zone under Hubballi railway division. It is situated beside National Highway 63 at Binkadakatti in Gadag district in the Indian state of Karnatak.
