= Shishuvinahala =

Shishuvinahala Shishunala
- Village
- Location within Karnataka Location within India
- Coordinates: 15°5′44″N 75°19′24″E
- Country: India
- State: Karnataka
- District: Haveri district
- Taluk: Shiggaon

Population (2001)
  - Total: 2,800

Languages
  - Official: Kannada
- Time zone: UTC+5:30 (IST)
- PIN: 581126
- Telephone code: 08378
- Vehicle registration: KA-27

Shishuvinahala also known as Shishunala is a village in Shiggaon taluk of Haveri district in the state of Karnataka, India

== Geography ==
Shishuvinahala is located at 15.095496N,75.323778E. This village lies between Hulagur and Gudigeri of Shiggaon taluk.

== Demographics ==
As of 2001 India census, Shishuvinahal had a population of 2,800 with 1,502 males and 1,298 females and 485 Households.

== Importance of the village ==
Shishuvinahala is the birthplace of the great mystic poet Sri Shishunala Sharif. His contribution to the Kannada folklore is very much revered. There a Temple in the village where Sri Shishunala Sharif composed his poems.

== Transport ==
=== Bus routes ===
Shishuvinahala is well connected by road. There are buses from Hubli, Savanur, Shiggaon and Hulagur.

=== Railways ===
The nearest Railway Stations are at Gudigeri and Saunshi.

== See also ==
- Gudgeri
- Lakshmeshwar
- Savanur
- Kundgol
- Shiggaon
- Haveri
- Karnataka
