= Shishunala Sharif =

Indian social reformer, philosopher and poet

- Born: sharif 7 March 1819; Shishuvinahala, Shiggaon taluk, Haveri district, Karnataka, India
- Died: 3 July 1889 (aged 70); Shishuvinahala
- Resting place: Shishuvinahala
- Parents: Imam Saheb (father); Hujjama (mother)
Shishunala Sharif
Senior posting
- Teacher: Guru Govind Bhatta

Santha Shishunala Sharif (1819–1889) was an Indian saint, social reformer, philosopher and poet.

== Birth and early life ==
Santa Shishunala Sharif was born as Mahammad Sharif on 7 March 1819 in Shishuvinahala, a village in Shigganvi (now Shiggaon taluk, Haveri district), Karnataka. He was the son of Imam Saheb, who was a disciple of Hajaresha Qadri, whose dream was to unite Hinduism and Islam. Hajaresha Qadri used to give "Linga Deeksha", or initiation by tying a linga around the neck of a disciple, as per the Lingayat tradition. His father used to teach him Ramayana, Mahabharata, and even the teachings of Allama Prabhu. Legend has it that Shishunala Sharif was conceived with the blessings of Basavanna.

When Sharif was a boy, he was taught the tenets of both religions. In his birthplace Shishuvinahala, both Hindus and Muslims revere him as a saint at the same temple.

== Meeting Govinda Bhatta ==
Govinda Bhatta, a Brahmin, was famous in the region as an unconventional Master. He spent time with anyone who invited him, and ate anywhere he felt like eating.

One day, Govinda Bhatta came to Shishuvinahala, and Sharif's father found him seated under a tree. He asked him to accept his son as disciple. In front of the father, Govinda Bhatta called the young boy and said, "Sharif, who is your father?" The villagers laughed, but were shocked when the boy brashly said, "What kind of question are you asking? Your father and mine are the same!". Govinda Bhatta laughed, patted the boy on the back and said, "Excellent, Sharif! The land is fertile, the seed will sprout well. O Imam, leave Him to my care! From today, He is my son!"

Sharif followed Govinda Bhatta back to his village. The boy was found to be curious about matters beyond logic and the world, and about the secrets of creation. These qualities were nurtured by Govinda Bhatta. Society was surprised by their closeness. In the eyes of Muslims, the boy was a Kaafir (infidel) and for Hindus, the Master was a Mleccha (outsider).

=== Thread Ceremony ===
One day, Govinda Bhatta was seated with some Brahmins at the village crossroad. Just then, Sharif comes by. The Master calls him to sit, and the two sit very closely. The others were offended, and say, "Does that Muslim look like a Brahmin to you? You have no sense of cleanliness or social status!" Bhatta laughs, saying, "Just because you are born a Brahmin, do you think you’ll become one? None of you is a greater Brahmin than this boy!". He takes off his sacred thread puts it around Sharif, embracing him tightly. Sharif, overcome with feeling, prostrates himself at the Master's feet (Hakida janivarava sadhgurunatha).

=== The Mullah ===
One day, a Mullah asks Sharif, "So, I see you’ve stopped coming to the mosque! Do you even remember what Namaz is?" To this, Sharifa calmly replies, pointing at his own body, "I dwell in this mosque, so why go and come? I am in constant worship of "I AM", so what can be greater Namaz?"

== Later years ==
Sharif's parents force him to marry. Sharif goes to Bhatta and asks, "If I become a Samsari, won’t I get stuck in desire and illusion?" The Master replies, "Why are you worried? Even in the worst rain, does wind become wet? Does light become soaked? So go and get married!"

Sharif married Fathima, and had a daughter. He worked as a schoolmaster in Karadagi, to support the family. However, his wife passes away shortly. Sharif's neighbours adopt the child, and Sharif quits his job. He starts participating in folk dramas, teaching simple lessons through daily experiences. Sharif went through extreme poverty, often going without meals. However, Govinda Bhatta stood by him through all His troubles.

After Govinda Bhatta died, Sharif lived on for another twenty years. When he started falling ill and realised his days were few, he decided to give up his body according to "Sharana" tradition, in which ash is smeared on the body, and the feet of a Jangama, or Shaivite monk, are worshipped. The monk's feet are then placed on the head, and life is given up. Nobody agreed, but on his insistence, a Jangama by name Hirematta Karibasavayya agreed. Shishunala Sharif left his body on 3 July 1889 AD.

The people were left confused. Sharif was born a Muslim but lived with Hindu. The leaders of both communities came together and agreed to perform the last rites as per both religions. The Quran was read simultaneously with the Hindu Mantras.

A Samadhisthan was constructed in Shishuvinahala, in a vast compound. There, statues of both Govinda Bhatta and Sharif are visited by both Hindus and Muslims, to this day.

== Teachings ==
- When the mind gets very involved in the world and becomes agitated, hit it with the hatchet and stop it.
- The Word of knowledge given by the Master annihilates the mind and makes all difficulties vanish.
- As one would take good care of a horse, take care of the mind by feeding it with spiritual food. At times, whip it like a horse, so that it behaves in a manner pleasing to the Master.
- This house (the body) moves around so much, yet through proper discipline, in this very house, one can experience Shiva.
- Jiva, like a bird in a cage, has freedom only within the cage of body and mind. But, by the Grace of the Master, the bird is able to spread its wings to fly through the entire universe.
- The Holy Feet of his Master may look small and ordinary; however, they swallow up the huge ego when the head is placed at them.
- I am not the human birth, but verily the Narayana Parabramha Sadashiva. (Na Na Embudu Nanalla)

Sharif was known to compose poems as per the situation and sing them to spread the message. Though he never wrote down his compositions, by word of mouth many of them have been passed down to future generations. The composition "Sorutihudu Maneya Maligi" can be traced to Great Famine 1876-1888 that plagued southern and western India. People dying in millions resorted to blind beliefs and faiths some even asking him to control the famine. Though the source cannot be cited, given his composition and the dire situation the people were in, this particular composition must have come during the famine years.

== Famous compositions ==
1. Kodagana koli nungitha nodavva thangi
2. Gudiya Nodiranna Dehada
3. Alabeda Thangi Alabeda
4. Tharavalla Thagi Ninna
5. Biddiyabbe Muduki
6. Soruthihudu Maneya Maaligi
7. Ellaranthavanalla Nanna Ganda
8. Mohada Hendathi Theerida Balika
9. Sneha Madabekinthavala
10. gudugudiya sedu nodo
11. lokada kalaji
12. Duddu Kettadu Nodanna
13. Kela jaana Shiva dhyana madanna
14. Na Na Embudu Nanalla

== Film ==
Santha Shishunala Sharifa is a Kannada feature film directed by T.S. Nagabharana in 1990. The main character was played by the Kannada actor Sridhar, and the supporting cast included Girish Karnad and Suman Ranganath

Sharifa's songs have been sung by famous playback singers, notably C. Ashwath, Shimoga Subbanna, Raghu Dixit and Archana Udupa.

Raghu's self-titled debut album launched by the popular music director duo Vishal–Shekhar contains two songs "Soruthihudu Maniya Maligi" and "Gudugudiya Sedi Noda", which are compositions of Sharifa. His next album Jag Changa also has 2 songs originally written by Shishunala Sharifa "Lokada Kalaji" and "Kodagana Koli Nungitha".
