= Mulgund =

Mulgund Mulagunda
- Town
- Location in Karnataka, India Mulgund (India)
- Coordinates: 15°16′55″N 75°31′19″E
- Country: India
- State: Karnataka
- District: Gadag
- Taluk: Gadag
- Lok Sabha Constituency: Haveri
- Elevation: 675 m (2,215 ft)

Population (2001)
  - Total: 18,098

Languages
  - Official: Kannada
- Time zone: UTC+5:30 (IST)
- PIN: 582117
- Vehicle registration: KA 26
- Website: http://www.mulagundatown.mrc.gov.in/

Mulgund or Mulagunda is a panchayat town in Gadag district in the Indian state of Karnataka.

== Geography ==
Mulgund is located at 15.25°N 75.53°E. It has an average elevation of 675 metres (2214 feet).

== Demographics ==
As of 2001 India census, Mulgund had a population of 18,077. Males constitute 51% of the population and females 49%. Mulgund has an average literacy rate of 53%, lower than the national average of 59.5%: male literacy is 63%, and female literacy is 42%. In Mulgund, 15% of the population is under 6 years of age.

== Importance ==
Mulgund was the capital city of Mulgund 12 province. Mulgund is famous for the ancient Siddeshwara temple, Shobhaneshwara temple, Nagareshwara Temple and chaya chandranath jain temple that is on hill and unique.
