= Adavi, Maharashtra =

Village in Maharashtra, India

Adavi
- Village
- Location in Maharashtra, India Adavi (India)
- Coordinates: 18.6853441°N 73.5266323°E
- Country: India
- State: Maharashtra
- District: Pune
- Tehsil: Mawal

Government
  - Type: Panchayati Raj
  - Body: Gram panchayat

Area
  - Total: 150.62 ha (372.2 acres)

Population (2011)
  - Total: 470
  - Density: 310/km^{2} (810/sq mi)
- Sex ratio 229/241 ♂/♀

Languages
  - Official: Marathi
  - Other spoken: Hindi
- Time zone: UTC+5:30 (IST)
- Pin code: 410405
- Telephone code: 02114
- ISO 3166 code: IN-MH
- Vehicle registration: MH-14
- Website: pune.nic.in

Adavi is a village in Mawal taluka of Pune district in the state of Maharashtra, India. It encompasses an area of 150.62 ha (372 acres). It is near National Highway 4.

== Administration ==
The village is administrated by a sarpanch, an elected representative who leads a gram panchayat. At the time of the 2011 Census of India, the gram panchayat governed two villages and was based at Adhe Khurd.

== Demographics ==
At the 2011 census, the village comprised 79 households. The population of 470 was split between 229 males and 241 females.

== See also ==
- List of villages in Mawal taluka
