= Satyavara Tirtha =

Dvaita philosopher

Personal life
- Born: Haveri Krishnacharya; 1716 Haveri (Present-day Haveri district, Karnataka
- Died: 1797 (aged 80–81) Santhebidanur (Present-day Anantapur district, Andhra Pradesh)

Religious life
- Religion: Hinduism
- Order: Vedanta (Uttaradi Math)
- Philosophy: Dvaita, Vaishnavism

Religious career
- Teacher: Satyasandha Tirtha
- Successor: Satyadharma Tirtha
- Disciples: Satyadharma Tirtha, Adavi Jayatirthacharya

Satyavara Tirtha (c. 1716 - c. 1797) was an Indian philosopher, scholar and the pontiff of Uttaradi Math, a math (mutt) dedicated to Dvaita philosophy. He was the successor of Satyasandha Tirtha and the 27th pontiff of Uttaradi Math since Madhvacharya, the chief proponent and the one who rejuvenated this Dvaita philosophy and served the pontificate from 1794 to 1797.

== Works ==
The number of extant works ascribed to Satyavara Tirtha are only two in number. One is the commentary on Nyaya Sudha of Jayatirtha and the second work is a commentary on Mahabharata Tatparya Nirnaya of Sri Madhvacharya.

== Bibliography ==
- Rao, C. R. (1984). Srimat Uttaradi Mutt: Moola Maha Samsthana of Srimadjagadguru Madhvacharya.
- Sharma, B. N. Krishnamurti (2000). A History of the Dvaita School of Vedānta and Its Literature, Vol 1. 3rd Edition. Motilal Banarsidass (2008 Reprint). ISBN 978-8120815759.
