= Ingalagi, Belgaum =

Ingalagi
- Village
- Country: India
- State: Karnataka
- District: Belgaum
- Taluka: Mudhol

Government
  - Body: Village panchayat

Population (2011)
  - Total: 3,965

Languages
  - Official: Kannada
- Time zone: UTC+5:30 (IST)

Ingalagi is a panchayat village in Belgaum district in the southern state of Karnataka, India.

There are two villages in the gram panchayat: Ingalagi and Yadahalli.

== Demographics ==
In the 2001 India census, Ingalagi had a population of 3,359, with 1,741 males and 1,618 females.

In the 2011 census, the population of Ingalagi was reported as 3,965.
