= Yalvigi =

- City
- Location within Karnataka
- Coordinates: 15°3′47″N 75°28′0.1″E
- Country: India
- State: Karnataka

Yalvigi is a city in Karnataka, India.
