= Lakshmeshwara =

- Town/Taluk
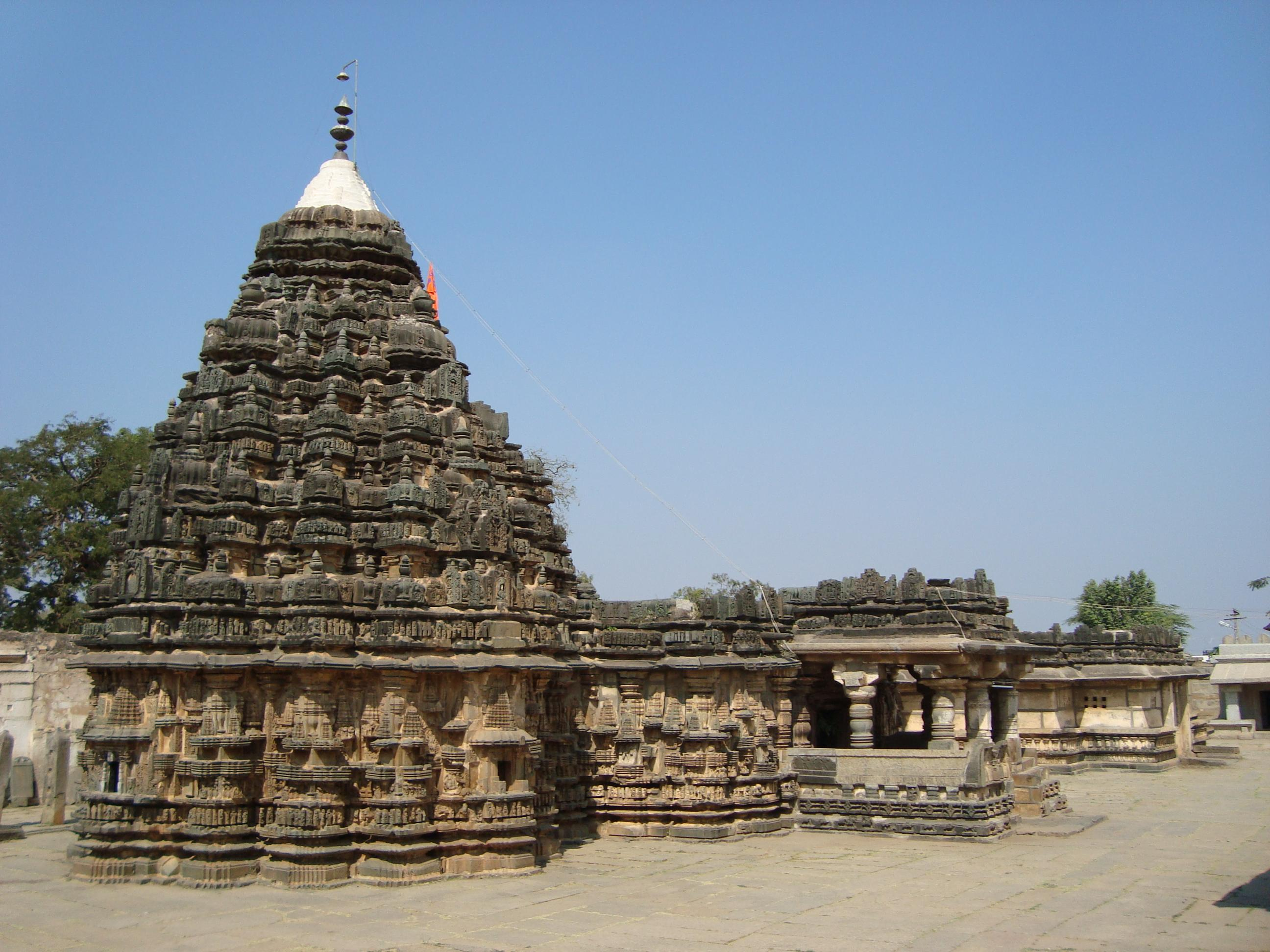
- Someshwara Temple, Lakshmeshwara

- Location in Karnataka, India Lakshmeshwara (India)
- Coordinates: 15.13°N 75.47°E
- Country: India
- State: Karnataka
- District: Gadag
- Lok Sabha Constituency: Haveri

Area
  - Total: 6.95 km^{2} (2.68 sq mi)
- Elevation: 634 m (2,080 ft)

Population (2011)
  - Total: 36,754
  - Density: 5,290/km^{2} (13,700/sq mi)

Languages
  - Official: Kannada
- Time zone: UTC+5:30 (IST)
- PIN: 582 116
- ISO 3166 code: IN-KA
- Vehicle registration: KA 26

Lakshmeshwara (historically known as Puligere) is a town, and newly created Taluk place along with Gajendragad in Gadag district, in the Indian state of Karnataka. It is about 40 km from Gadag and 55 km from Hubli. It is an agricultural trading town. Historically was an important center of Jainism and served as the capital role under the Badami Chalukyas and subsequent dynasties.

It was known as Purigere, Puligere, Hurigere, Huligere and Purika-nagara in the past.

Lakshmeshwara Temple dedicated to Shiva. There are many important temples in this historic town, including the other Shiva temple, the Someshwara Temple. There are two ancient Jain temples (Sannabasadi and Shankabasadi) in the town, as well as a notable Jamma Masjid. Lakshmeshwara is also home for many smaller shrines, a dargah, the Kodiyellamma temple, the Mukha Basavanna shrine, and a gigantic idol of Suryanarayana.

== Geography ==
Lakshmeshwar is at 15.13°N 75.47°E. It has an average elevation of 634 metres (2080 feet).

== Demographics ==
As of 2001 India census, Lakshmeshwara had a population of 33,411. Males constitute 51% of the population and females 49%. Lakshmeshwar has an average literacy rate of 62%, higher than the national average of 59.5%: male literacy is 70%, and female literacy is 53%. In Lakshmeshwar, 13% of the population is under 6 years of age.

== History ==
Lakshmeshwara is famous for prolific culture and literature. It is a place with rich heritage in Karnataka hence it is called as Tirulugannada Nadu. and was an important center of Jainism and served as the capital of the Puligere region, playing a significant role under the Badami Chalukyas and subsequent dynasties. The earliest one seems to Sankha Basadi which has an inscription dated to the reign of Pulakesi II (609-642 CE). The priesthood at that time was in the hands of the priest hailing from Deva-gana of Mula Sangh.

Other names include Purigere, Porigere, Purikanagar and Pulikanagar. According to local sources, Puligeri (now Lakshmeshwara) had more than 700 Jain basadis during the rule of the Chalukyas rule. and What is known today as the Someshwara Temple of Lakshmeshwara was originally a Jain temple.

Lakshmeshwar or ancient Huligere or Puligere was the capital of Puligere-300. Puligere means pond of tigers. There are theories of the origin of the name Lakshmeshwara: Name itself suggest Lakshmi worshipped Shiva and Did Penance to be Goddess of wealth and main Deity of temple is Shiva.

Adikavi Pampa wrote his famous poetry in Lakshmeshwara.

Many Jain monks and writers have flourished here. They include Devachakra Bhattaraka, Shankanacharya, Hemadevacharya, Padmasena, Tribhuvana Chandra Padmita and Rama Dvacharya.

== Someshwara temple complex ==
The most important monument at Lakshemshwar is the Someshwara temple complex (11th century). The temple complex with three main entrances is surrounded by high walls look like a fort. It is a splendid specimen of Chalukya architecture.

In middle of the temple complex, there is a Someshwara temple, surrounded by many small temples mainly dedicated to Shiva, along the compound wall, built with granite, some halls in the complex meant for resting devotees.

=== Someshwara temple ===
Someshwara temple with the traditional structures of a temple includes a garbha griha, an ardha mantapa or halfway hall, a navaranga and a mukha mantapa or entrance porch.

The Nandi and Shiva Parvati idols in the temple are exquisitely sculpted. These idols are referred to as Saurashtra Someshwara, as these idols were brought by a Shiva devotee from Saurashtra and installed at Lakshmeshwara.

=== Open step-well ===
Inside the Someshwara temple complex, behind the temple, there is an open step-well. This step-well, being richly carved and ornamented, is of architectural and artistic significance.

=== Kannada inscriptions ===
At the Someshwara temple complex, there are many Kannada inscription. Over 50 stone inscriptions (records) show the cultural importance.

- The Kannada (Kannadiga) poet Kayasena of Mulgund, who wrote in the Bharmamrita, was a disciple of Narendrasena II of the Lakshmeshwar inscription of 1081.
- Lakshmeshwar inscription of the reign of Jagadekamella II.
- Two Jain Inscription of Mulgund and Lakshmeshwar
- The Lakshmeshwar inscriptions (in Kannada dated 13 January 735), during 733–744 CE Vikramaditya II was the son of King Vijayaditya who ascended the Badami Chalukyas throne following the death of his father.
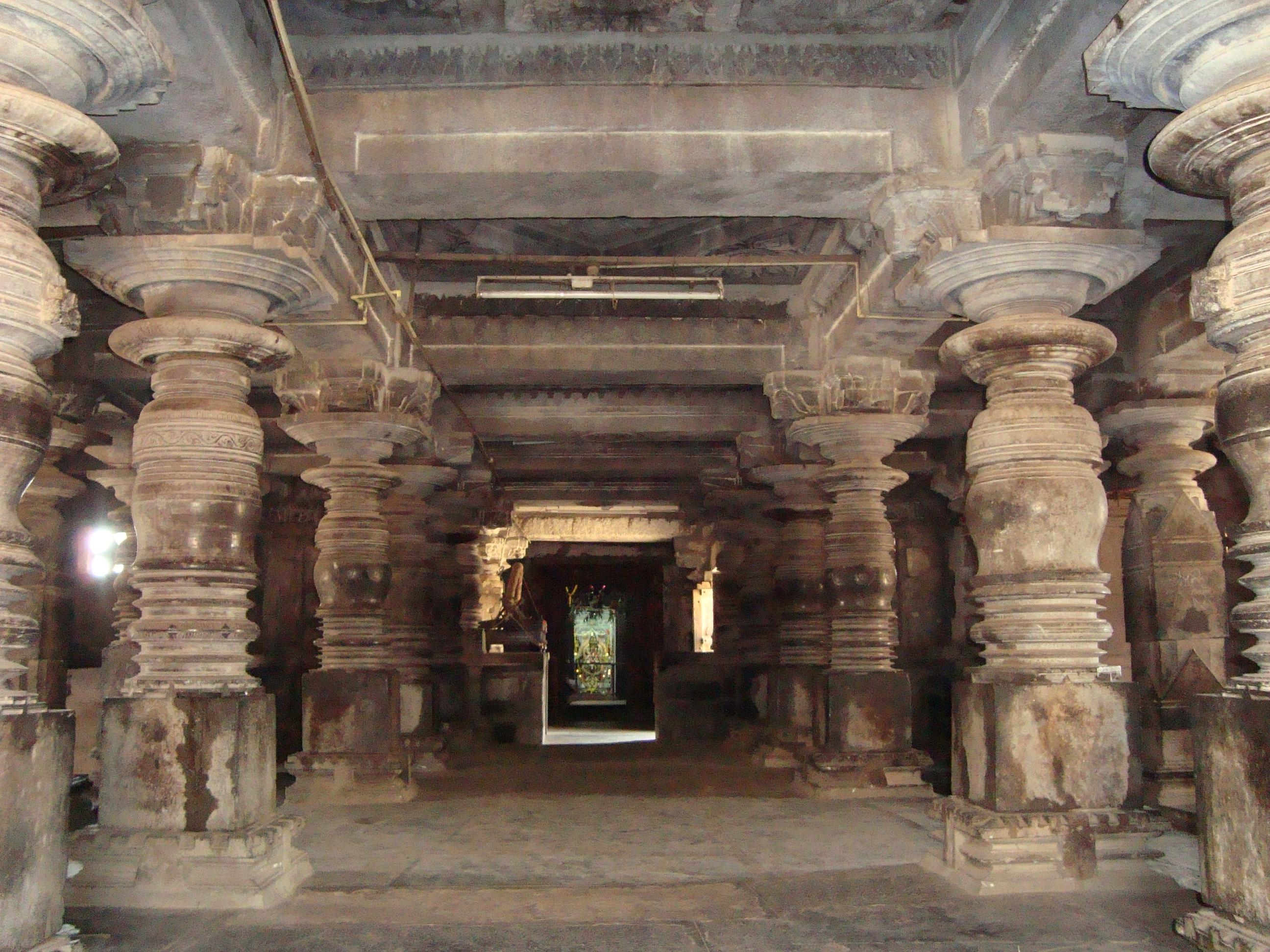
Mantapa (hall) with lathe turned pillars at Someshwara temple

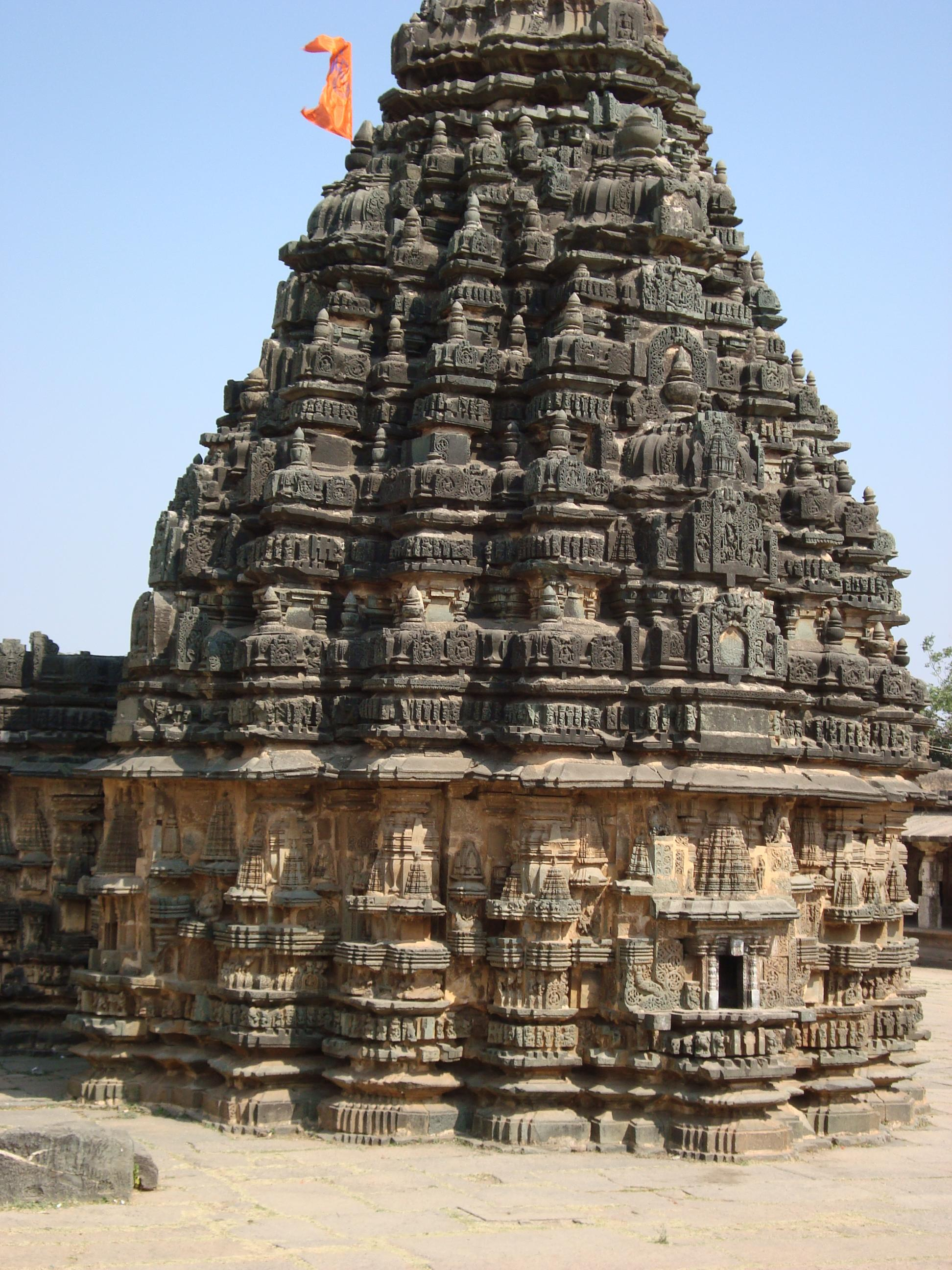
Shikhara over the sanctum of Someshwara temple

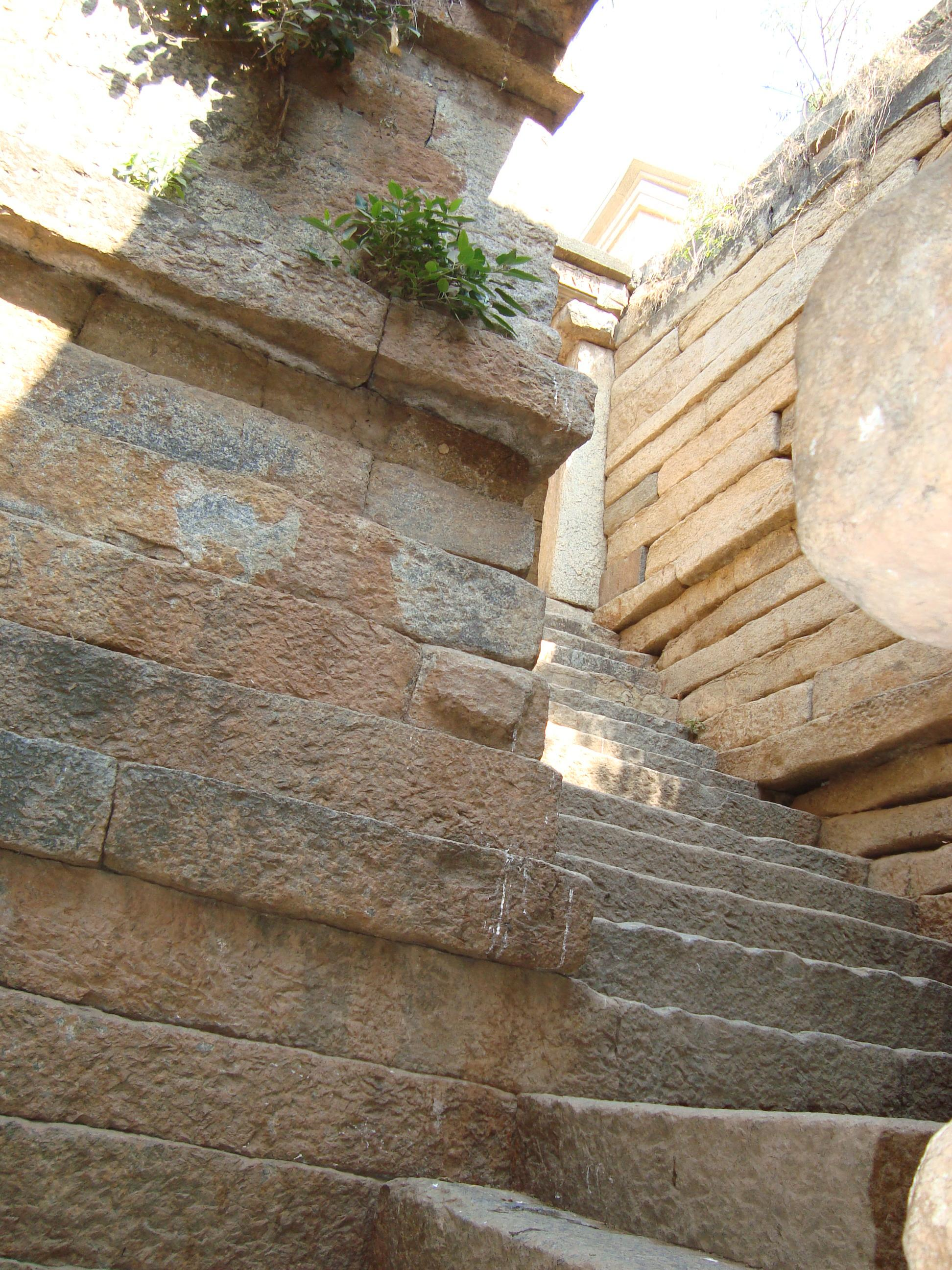
Step-well at Someshwara temple complex

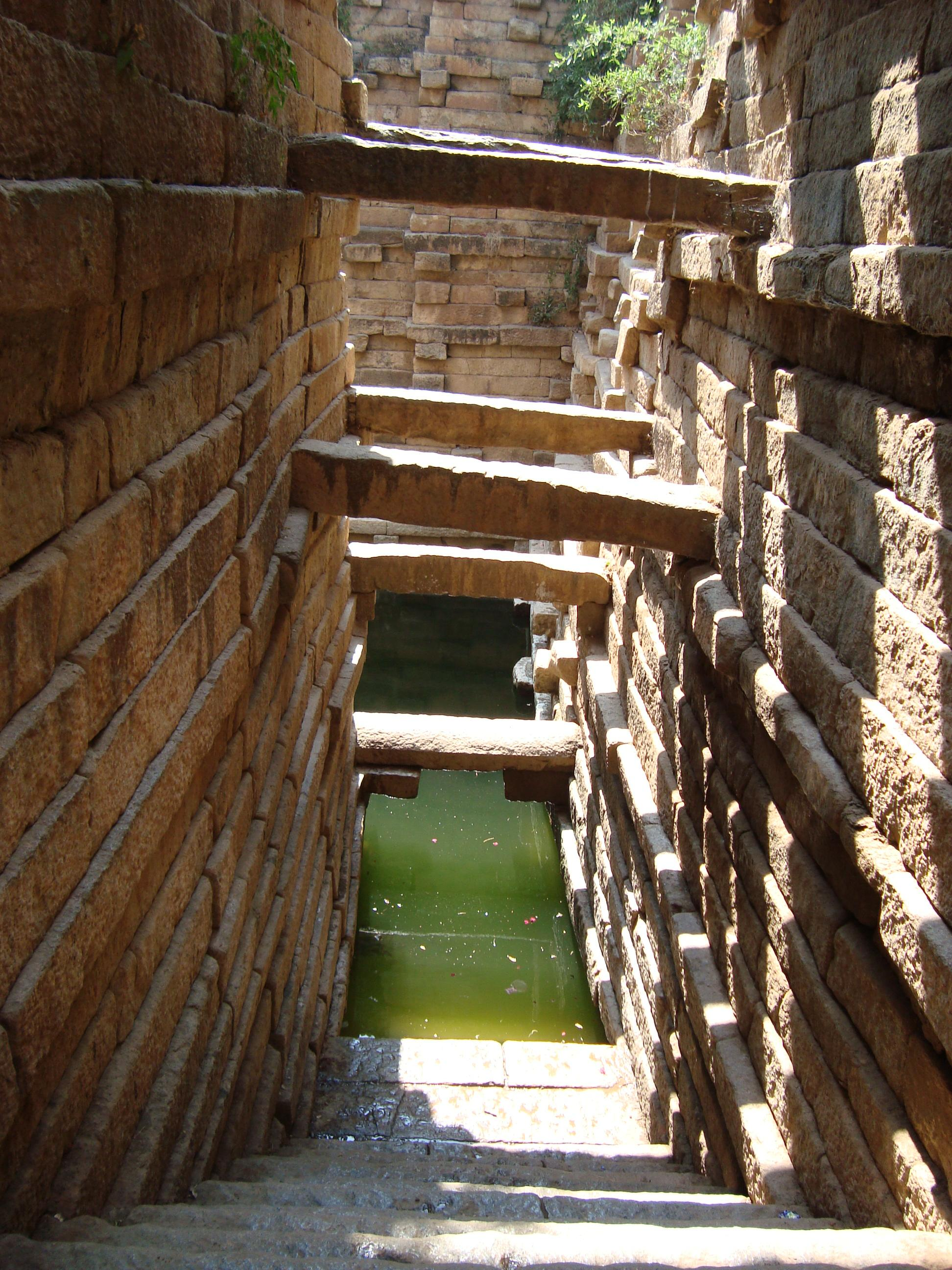
Open well at Someshwara temple complex

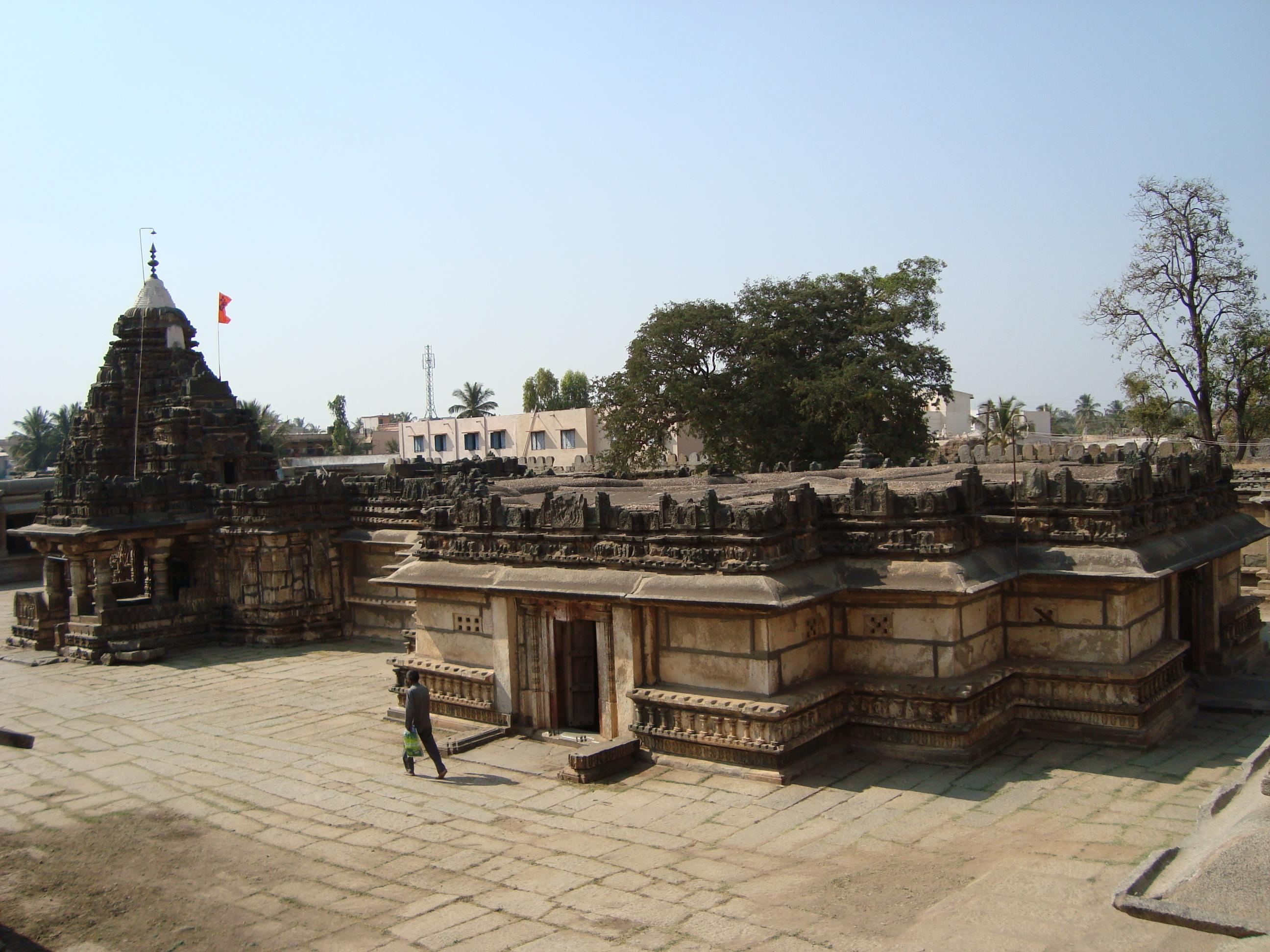
Someshwara temple

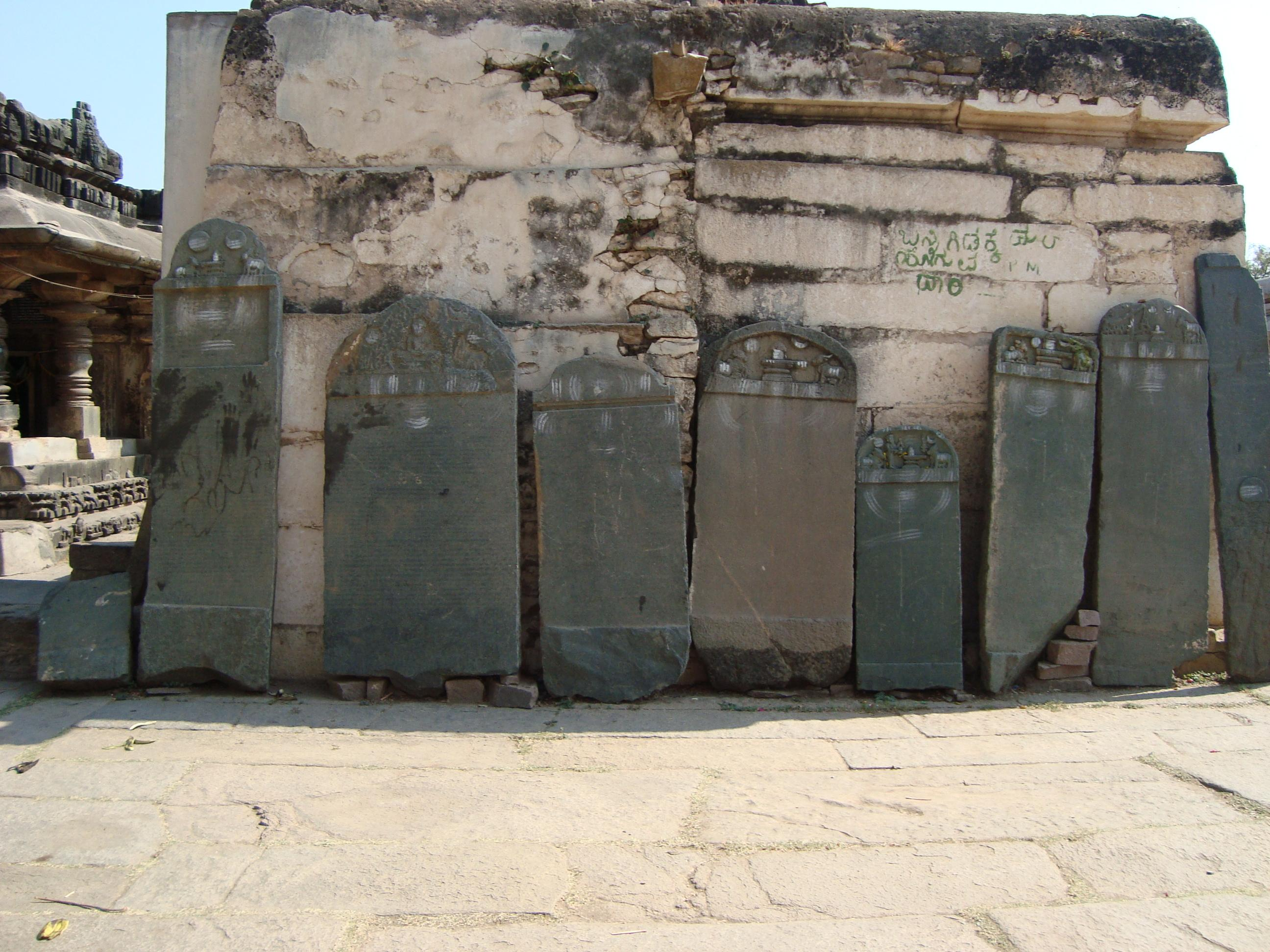
Kannada inscriptions at Someshwara temple complex

== Jain Basadis ==
Jainism related to Lakshmeshwara has long history. Lakshmeshwara Jain temples dates back to 7th century CE. Lakshmeshwara is one of the ancient Jain centres. Many Jain temples are mentioned in the inscriptions.

Shanka Basadi

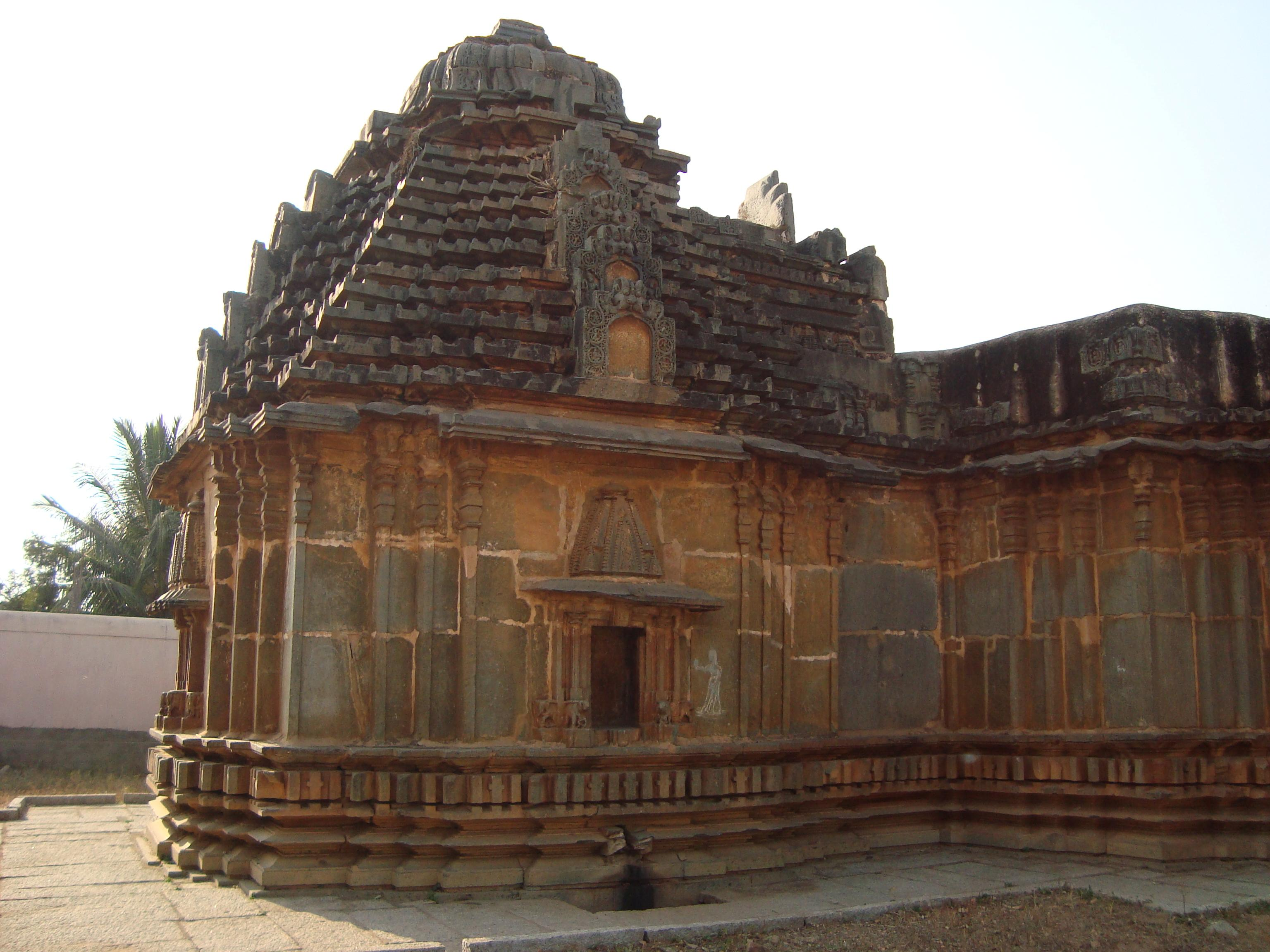
Historical Jain temple at Lakshmeshwara, Karnataka

Shanka Basadi is one of the two historical Jinalayaa at Lakshmeswar. Neminath (Shankha is the symbol of Neminath), the 22nd Jain thirthankara, is the presiding deity of this Jain Basadi. Basadi, which consists of a garbhagriha, a large ardhamandapa, larger mahamandapa and a rangamandapa. The rangamandapa has three entrances (south, north and west). It has a chaturmukha structure in diminutive model, each of which carries three figures. it has a rekhanagara shikhara. The unique feature of this temple is the Sahasrakuta Jinabimba in minute form. Adikavi Pampa wrote Adi Purana, seated in this Basadi.

Ananthanatha basadi

Another Jain temple at Lakshmeshwara is the Ananthanatha Basadi, built in AD 1250, which is in the middle of the town. This Basadi is an example of the Chalukya style of architecture.

== Islamic monuments ==
During the 16th &17th century Laxmeshwar was governed by the general Syed Ankush khan (syed bukhari) under Adil shahi kingdom of Bijapur, He was warrior also pious noble saint so The king appoint and rewarded him this place and surrounding villages as his jagir, He had his fort here at laxmeshwar where he would run his darbar (today's govt revenue offices). During his period many Islamic monuments came into existence. This saint ankush khan also donated zagir at Shiratti to one desai for religious activities and started the fakirswamy tradition, Later syed Ankushkhan settled in a village near laxmeshwar where there's his mausoleum dargah (Bade nana dargah), where thousands of devotees gather every month; Every year urus is celebrated by the saints Lenial descendants Dr D. B. Peerzade and family.

After the fall of adil shahi sultanate 19th century pre and early post independence laxmeshwar was under Sangli State (patvardhan) later laxmeshwar was under bombay presidency before the formation of state of karnataka...... :::::: The Dargah (mausoleum) of Sulaiman Badshah Qadri, also known as the "Doodh Nana Valli" is located in the town. The dargah is known as "Doodh Nana" because it is customary for people to bring milk ("doodh") to perform fateha at this mausoleum. The holy man buried here is Sulaiman Badshah Qadri Baba. This Sufi saint is very famous and even his painting photos are sold in different dargahs all over south India.

=== Bade Nana Dargah ===
During Adilshahi rule (Bijapur Sultanate), they built monuments like Masjid, Dargah. They adapted the Indo-Saracenic architectural style.

Syed Ankushkhan wali Dargah named after Ankuskhan of Bijapur. The Dargha is about one km from the KSRTC bus stand Lakshmeshwar at manjalapur. It is as old as Jumma Masjid, which is constructed in Indo-Saracenic architecture style.

=== Jumma Masjid ===
At Lakshmeshwar there is an artistically raised mosque (masjid) of Adilshahi times.

The Jumma Masjid at Lakshmeshwara which dates back to the time of the Adilshahi rule. The mosque was built in 1617 by Ankush Khan. Juma Masjid In the same Street of Dargah Shareef you will find the Juma Masjid, a stone mosque constructed by Syed Ankush Khan in 1617 AD. Even the chains are made of stones. The masjid attracts a large number of tourists and it comes under Archeological Survey of India.

Jumma Masjid is constructed in Indo-Saracenic style. The massive doors of the mosque are like a fort entrance. The mosque has two tall minarets and a large semicircular dome. There are Dravidian style chains hanging across the ceiling of the mosque.

== See also ==
- Shigli
- Western Chalukya
- Western Chalukya architecture
- Lakkundi
- Dambal
- Kundgol
- Annigeri
- Magadi Bird Sanctuary
- Sudi
- Gadag
- Mahadeva Temple (Itagi)
- Haveri
- North Karnataka
- Tourism in North Karnataka
