= Kundgol =

Kundgol Kundagola
- town
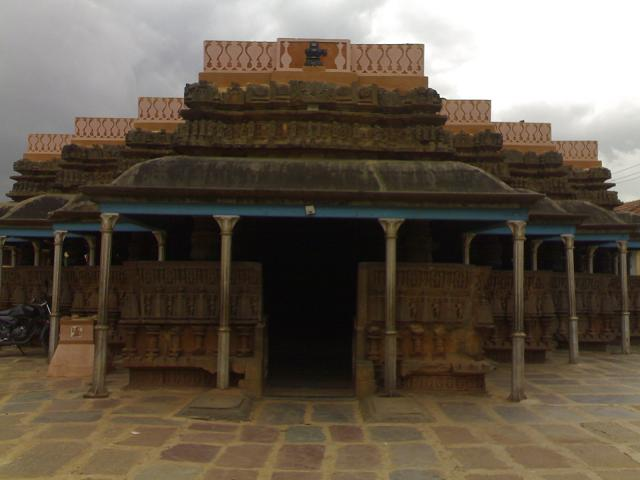
- Shambhulinga temple at Kundgol

- Location in Karnataka, India
- Coordinates: 15.25°N 75.25°E
- Country: India
- State: Karnataka
- District: Dharwad
- Founder: Vikramaditya II
- Elevation: 615 m (2,018 ft)

Population (2001)
  - Total: 16,837

Languages
  - Official: Kannada
- Time zone: UTC+5:30 (IST)
- Postal code: 58113
- ISO 3166 code: IN-KA
- Vehicle registration: KA-25 ,KA-63
- Website: www.kundagoltown.gov.in

Kundgol, also known as Kundagola, is a panchayat town in the Dharwad district, located in the Indian state of Karnataka. It is located about 14 km southwest of Hubli, and 32 km southwest of Dharwad.

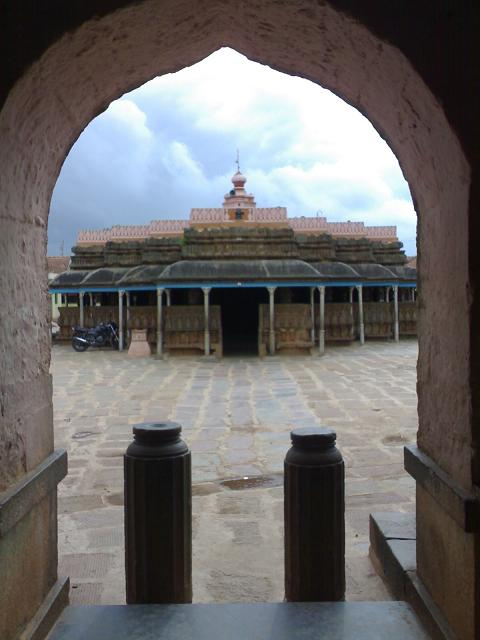
Shambhulinga temple in Kundgol, Karnataka

The town is the birthplace of Rambhau Kundalkar (also known as Pandit Sawai Gandharva), a Hindustani musician.

== History ==
Kundgol translates to "a place with many kunds" (tanks or ponds) in Kannada, the dominant language of Karnataka. This name likely reflects the historical presence of numerous bodies of water in-and-around the town, which would have been vital for agriculture and daily life in the region. The suffix "-gol" could also refer to a village, or settlement in some contexts, further reinforcing the idea of Kundgol as a community centered around its water resources.

Kundgol existed under the core area of the Western Chalukya Empire, as evident by the existence of the 11th century Shri Shambulingeshwara temple. Before 1948, Kundgol was a non-contiguous part of the princely state of Jamkhandi.

Later, Kundgol came under the rule of the Vijayanagara Empire. It is known for its ancient temples, with the Murugharajendra Math being a significant religious and cultural institution. Agriculture is an important part of the local economy, with crops such as sugarcane and cotton cultivated in the region.

== Hindustani music and Kundgol ==
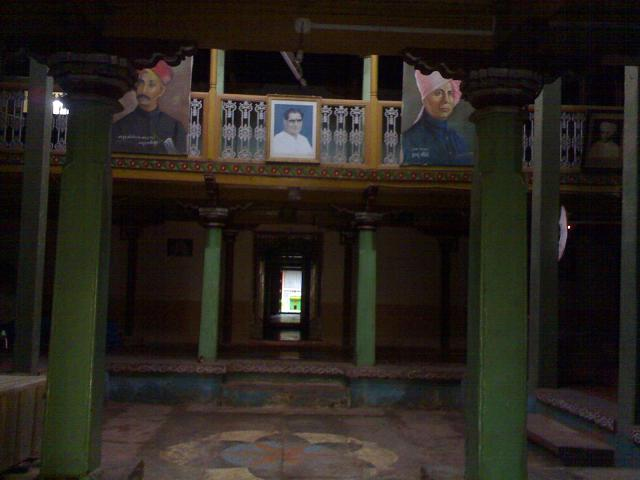
Wade at Kundagol. Sawai Gandharva, Bhimsen Joshi, Gangubai Hangal are associated with this Wade

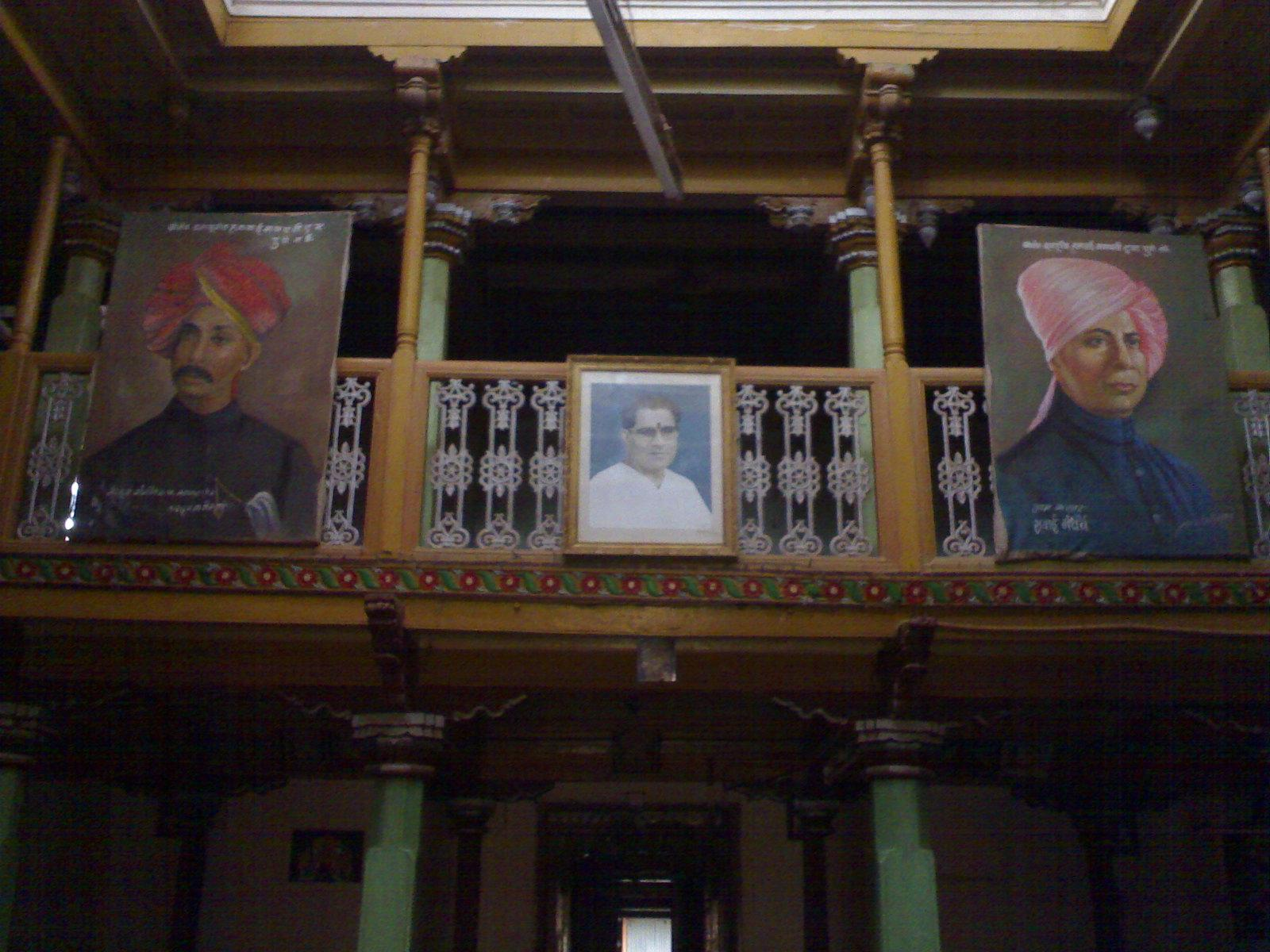
Wade at Kundagol. Sawai Gandharva, Bhimsen Joshi, Gangubai Hangal are associated with this wade

=== Pandit Sawai Gandharva ===
Rambhau Kundgolkar, also known as Sawai Gandharva, was born in Kundgol in 1886.

=== Pandit Bhimsen Joshi ===
Pandit Bhimsen Joshi travelled across India in search of a music teacher before becoming a disciple of Sawai Gandharva of Kundgol. Initially, Sawai Gandharva declined to accept him as a student, but later agreed to train him.

According to Dr. Gangubai Hangal, the late Abdul Karim Khan visited Dharwad in 1900 and taught Sawai Gandharva, a guru who produced many disciples, such as Dr. Hangal and Pandit Bhimsen Joshi. The Nadgir family of Kundgol is known for patronising Hindustani music.

To cater to the needs of cultural activities, Dharwad city boasts of the opera house Sawai Gandharva Natyagruha, named after the Hindustani Musician Sawai Gandharva, the native of Kundgol town near Hubli, on the Hubli - Bangalore rail line. Notable Hindustani classical vocalist Dr. Gangubai Hangal was born in, and remained a long-term resident of Hubli. She is regarded as a significant figure in the modern history of the genre.

On 5 March 1913, Dr. Smt. Gangubai Hangal was born into a family of musicians in Dharwad. Her mother, Smt. Ambabai, was a Carnatic singer, and her father, Sri Chikkurao Nadiger of Ranebennur, was an agriculturist. Dr. Gangubai was initiated into music by her mother. She learned music under the guidance of Sri Krishnamacharya Hulgur, and later under Sri Sawai Gandharva alias Sri Rambhau Kundalkar, a disciple of the late Ustad Abdul Karim Khan, one of the main architects of the Kirana Gharana school of music.

== Tourism ==
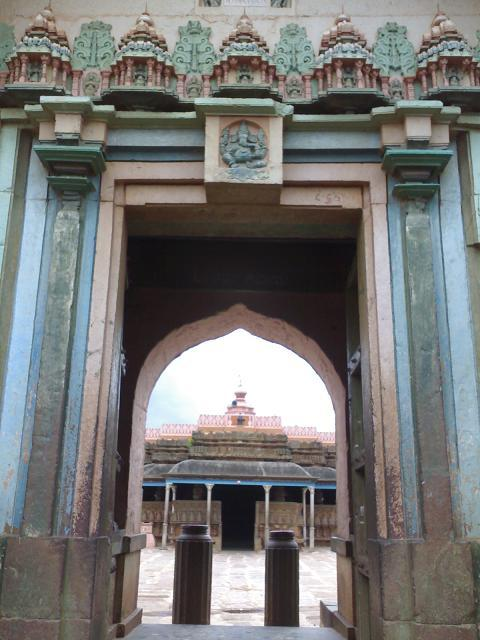
Shri Shambhulingeshwara Temple at Kundgol, Karnataka

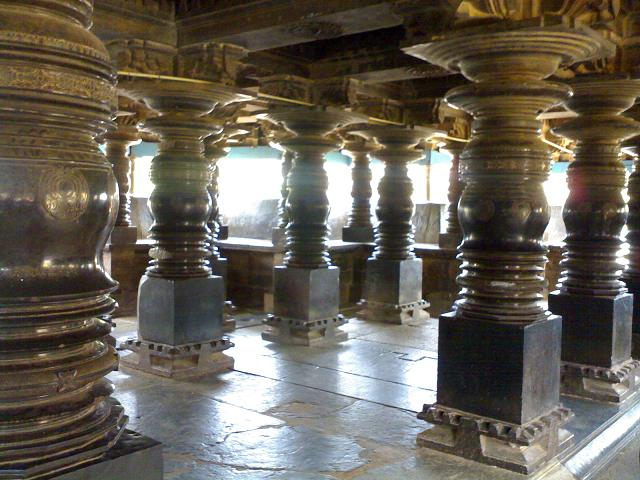
View of the Shambhulingeshwara Temple

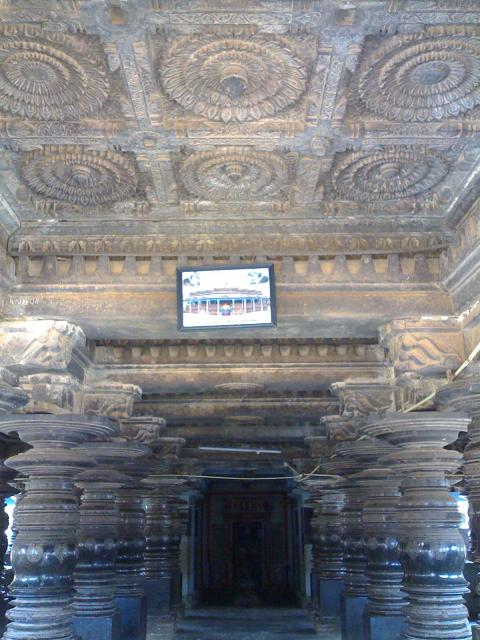
Shambhulingeshwara Temple architecture

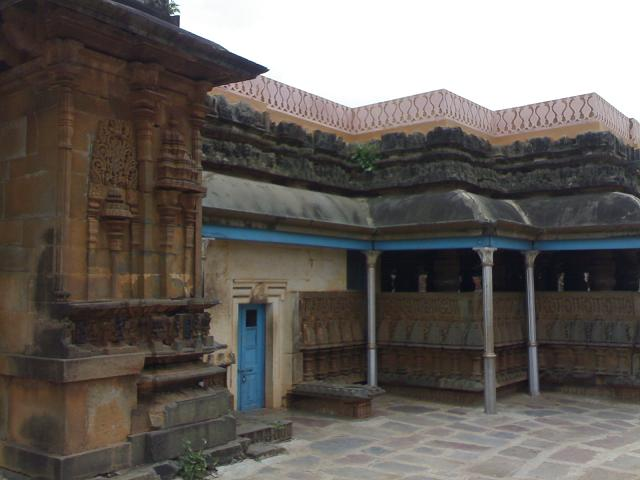
Entrance view of the temple

=== Shambulingeshwara Temple ===
Shri Shambulingeshwara Temple is an 11th-century Shiva temple located in Kundgol, Karnataka. It was built by the Western Chalukyas and features highly polished stones, fitted together using dovetail joints. The temple is known for its carved pillars and decorative architectural details.

Carvings near the temple entrance include lion faces with ornamental scrolls issuing from their mouths. The temple is dedicated to Shiva and Parvati. Despite damage over time, the exterior walls still display decorative elements such as lotus motifs, kirtimukha faces, and numerous Brahmanical figures.

The temple was reportedly damaged during historical conflicts, and was repaired by a local chief in 1808–1809.

The Shri Shambhulingeshwara Temple at Kundgol is an example of Western Chalukyan architecture, characterised by the use of soapstone, intricate carvings, and lathe-turned pillars. Temples of this period often feature a stellate (star-shaped) plan and detailed sculptural ornamentation.

== Geography ==
Kundgol is located at 15.25°N 75.25°E. It has an average elevation of 61 metres.

== Demographics ==
Kundgol city is divided into 15 wards, for which elections are held every 5 years. The Kundgol town Panchayat has a population of 18,726, of which 9,423 are males while 9,303 are females as per report released by Census India 2011.

The population of children ages 0–6 is 2,184 which is 11.66% of the total population of Kundgol (TP). In The Kundgol town Panchayat, the female sex ratio is 987 compared to the state average of 973. Moreover, the child sex ratio in Kundgol is around 1,020, compared to the Karnataka state average of 948. The literacy rate of Kundgol city is 76.96%, higher than the state average of 75.36%. In Kundgol, male literacy is around 84.33%, while female literacy rate is 69.46%.

Schedule Caste (SC) constitutes 8.65%, while Schedule Tribe (ST) were 2.86% of total population in Kundgol (TP).

== Notable people ==
- Sawai Gandharva (born 1886), Hindustani classical vocalist
- M. R. Patil, M.L.A (BJP, 2023)

== See also ==
- Western Chalukya
- Western Chalukya temples
- Lakshmeshwar
- Lakkundi
- Gadag
- Annigeri
- Dambal
