= Savanur =

Savanuru
- town
- Location in Karnataka, India
- Coordinates: 14°58′23″N 75°19′58″E
- Country: India
- State: Karnataka
- District: Haveri

Area
  - Total: 5.49 km^{2} (2.12 sq mi)
- Elevation: 573 m (1,880 ft)

Population (2001)
  - Total: 35,563
  - Density: 6,477.78/km^{2} (16,777.4/sq mi)

Languages
  - Official: Kannada
- Time zone: UTC+5:30 (IST)
- PIN: 581 118
- Telephone code: 08378
- Vehicle registration: KA-27
- Website: savanurtown.gov.in

Savanuru is a locality and taluk headquarters of Savanuru Taluk in Haveri District of Karnataka state, India.

== History ==
Savanuru was one of the princely states of British India, under the Bombay Presidency, and later the Deccan States Agency. Its Muslim rulers, styled "Nawab" descended from Abdul Karim Khan, an Afghan in the service of the Mughal Empire, who received a grant near Delhi in 1672. His successors ruled over extensive territories almost independently for over a century. However, Savanuru was located between the increasing power of the Marathas and the equally powerful Nizam of Hyderabad, Hyder Ali and Tipu Sultan, which gradually eroded away Savanuru's territory. By the second half of the eighteenth century, more than half of Savanuru had been ceded to the Marathas. By the end of the century, Tipu Sultan had annexed the remainder. With the death of Tipu Sultan in 1799, independence returned to Savanuru with about a third of its original territory. Thereafter, Savanuru slowly drifted towards British suzerainty. After the destruction of the Maratha Confederacy in 1818, Savanuru accepted protection from British India.

The final ruling Nawab of Savanuru, Abdul Majid Khan II, succeeded as a minor at the age of two years, and had been carefully raised and educated by his British overseers. He traveled widely and mixed with people in all walks of life in India and abroad. He returned to assume power determined to modernize his state, engaging in a furious program of building modern schools, dispensaries, government offices, courts, palaces, jails, irrigation tanks, and roads. In the short period of thirty-five years of his active rule, this little state advanced beyond anything achieved in the previous three centuries. The advent of Indian independence in 1947 and the withdrawal of the British caused the Nawab great sadness. Once the transfer formalities were completed, he retired to his private mansion at Dharwad, never setting foot in Savanuru again. After his death in 1954, local authorities, out of sincere respect for a distinguished gentleman held in high regard almost universally, buried him in his beloved Savanuru.

=== Satyabodha Tirtha Swamiji ===
Shri Satyabodha Tirtha took Brindavana in Savanur in 1783 and is present at Savanur.

We get some important information in the Bombay Gazetteer, Karnataka Dharwad district Chapter III . Page Nos 58-59 edited and published by James M. Campbell, compiled in the year 1863 A.D

Shri Satyabodha Vijaya is a kavya of twenty one sargas written by Kanchi Achrya who was his own disciple. The Mahakavya describes his life in detail. He was a saint of marvelous powers, his life is full of thrilling events. Let alone Hindus, even Mohammedanas worshipped him with great reverence, Tippu Sultan, Nawab of Ramnad, Nawab of Savanuru and many other Muslim princes felt it an honour.

Grand annual celebrations are conducted during Phalguna Krishna Pratipat (March/April). Shri Satyabodha Teertha was the pontiff of the Uttaradi Matha for 39 years.

Savanuru(ಸವಣೂರು) State covered an area of 189 square kilometers in 1901. It acceded to Dominion of India on 8 March 1948. It is currently a part

== Demographics ==
As of 2001 India census, Savanur had a population of 35,561. Males constitute 52% of the population and females 48%. Savanur has an average literacy rate of 49%, lower than the national average of 59.5%: male literacy is 54%, and female literacy is 43%. In Savanur, 16% of the population is under 6 years of age.

== The Savanuru Boababs ==
Dodda Hunise Mara, as it is known in the native language Kannada, is the proverbial baobab tree (Adansonia digitata). Savanuru might be the only place in the state of Karnataka or rather in whole India, which boasts of having three big Baobab trees on the outskirts of the town. This species of tree reaches heights of between 5–25 m (exceptionally 30 m) tall, and up to 7 m (exceptionally 11 m) in trunk diameter. The specimens at Savanuru are exceptional by all standards; the biggest one measures above 18 m at girth, the second one above 16 m and the third one above 14 m. These are planted in a triangular shape and stand together closely. The state government has put up a fence to protect the trees and a board briefly describing the history of the trees, which also gives the statistics about height and girth.

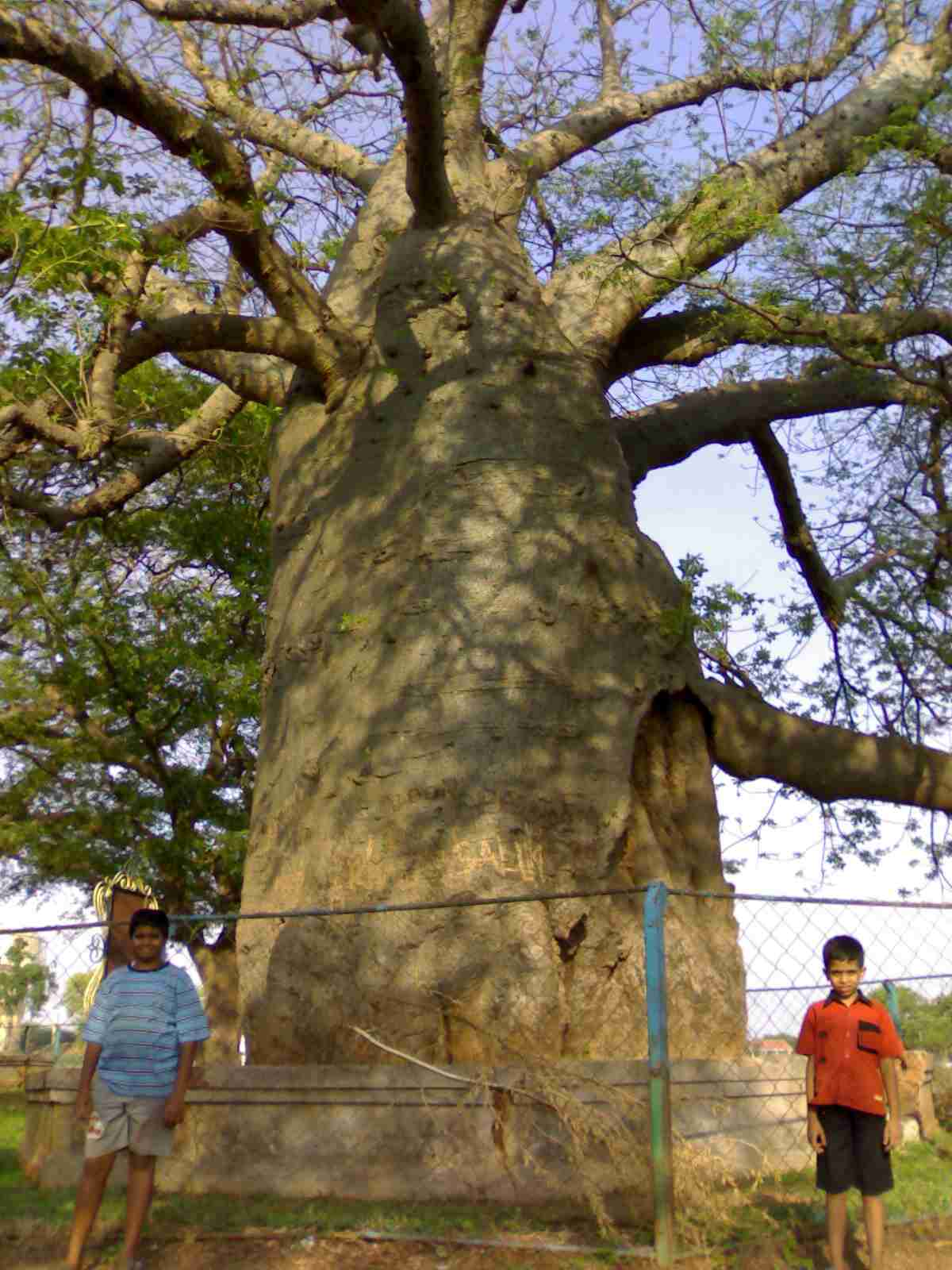
Savanuru Baobab 1

Savanuru Baobab 2

Savanuru Baobab 3

Savanuru Baobab 4
