= Akalkot Road railway station =

Railway station in Maharashtra, India

Akkalkot Road

General information
- Location: Akkalkot, Maharashtra; India
- Coordinates: 17.4507°N 76.1383°E
- Elevation: 456 metres (1,496 ft)
- System: Indian Railways station
- Owner: Indian Railways
- Operator: Central Railway
- Line: Mumbai–Chennai line Solapur–Guntakal section
- Platforms: 2

Construction
- Structure type: Standard on ground
- Parking: Yes
- Cycle facilities: No

Other information
- Status: Functioning
- Station code: AKOR
- Division(s): Solapur

History
- Opened: 1860
Location
- Location within India Location within Maharashtra

Akkalkot Road railway station is located 11 km from Akkalkot in Solapur district in the Indian state of Maharashtra and serves Akkalkot town. Station comes under Solapur railway division of Central Railway zone. There is great demand to stop trains especially Husainsagar express, Dadar Chennai superfast express and other trains as the railway record and local newspapers reflect. There is Shani temple near the station flocked by devotees. Swami Samarth temple flocked by devotees from entire India. The railway track in the Daund–Wadi sector is being doubled at a cost of 1000 crore. Station has computerized reservation counters, Public Call Office booth with subscriber trunk dialling facilities, waiting room, retiring room, vegetarian and non-vegetarian refreshment stalls and book stall.

== Trains ==
Some of the trains that pass through Akkalkot Road are:

- 57631/57632 Solapur–Guntakal Passenger
- 57130/57131 Hyderabad–Bijapur Passenger for Hyderababd
- 57650/57651 Wadi–Solapur Passenger
- 11301/11302 Udyan Express for Bangalore (overnight), Mumbai (day)
- 22157/22158 Mumbai–Chennai Mail for Mumbai (overnight) Chennai Tirupati, Mantralayam Rd
- 57659/57658 Solapur–Falaknuma Passenger for Hyderabad
- 57133/57134 Raichur–Bijapur Passenger
- 57628/57629 Gulbarga–Solapur Passenger
- 57129/57128 Bijapur-Bolarum Passenger for Hyderabad
