= Pune–Solapur line =

Pune-Solapur railway line

The Pune–Solapur line is a main railway line in India for trains including the Pune Solapur Intercity Express and the Hutatma Express.

Cities that lie directly on the line include Daund and Kurduvadi. While this is a branch line of the Mumbai Dadar–Solapur section of the Mumbai–Chennai line, some important trains including the Siddheshwar Express and the Solapur Mumbai CST Express run on this route.
