= Solapur–Miraj Express =

Kalburgi–Miraj-Kolhapur Superfast Express
Overview
- Service type: Superfast Express
- First service: 18 February 2017; 8 years ago
- Current operator: Central Railway zone

Route
- Termini: Kalburgi (KLBG); Kolhapur (KOP)
- Stops: 10
- Distance travelled: 268 km (167 mi)
- Average journey time: 7 hours 50 minutes
- Service frequency: Daily (Note: Runs seven days in a week for every direction.)
- Train number: 22155/22156

On-board services
- Classes: AC 2 Tier, AC 3 Tier, Sleeper 3 Tier, Unreserved
- Seating arrangements: Yes
- Sleeping arrangements: Yes
- Catering facilities: No
- Entertainment facilities: No

Technical
- Rolling stock: 2
- Track gauge: 1,676 mm (5 ft 6 in)
- Operating speed: 47 km/h (29 mph)

Kalburgi–Miraj-Kolhapur Superfast Express is an intercity Superfast Express train of the Indian Railways connecting Kalburgi in Karnataka and Kolhapur of Maharashtra.

It is the highest priority daily Superfast train of Miraj-Pandharpur-Kurduwadi section.

Kolhapur is a tourist hub and gateway of Konkan located in Kolhapur District of India, Kolhapur is famous for Goddes Mahalaxmi temple and Lord jyotiba temple

It is currently being operated with 22155/22156 train numbers on a daily basis by Solapur Division of Central Railway.

== Service ==
The 22155/Kalburgi–Kolhapur Express has Superfast speed of 4hrs 50mins journey. The 22156/Kolhapur–Kalburgi Express has Superfast speed and covers the journey in 4 hours 50 mins.

== Route and halts ==
The important halts of the train are:

- Solapur
- Mohol
- Madha
- Kurduvadi Junction
- Modnimb
- Pandharpur
- Sangola
- Jath Road
- Dhalgaon
- Kavathe Mahankal
- Sulgare
- Arag
- Miraj Junction

== Coach composition ==
The train consists of 14 coaches:

- 7 General
- 5 Reserved seating.
- 2 Second-class Luggage/parcel van

== Traction ==
Both trains are hauled by a Pune Loco Shed-based WDM-3A diesel locomotive from Solapur to Miraj and vice versa.
