= Solapur–Bijapur Express =

Overview
- Service type: Superfast
- First service: 5 July 2015; 10 years ago
- Current operator: Central Railway zone

Route
- Termini: Solapur (SUR); Bijapur (BJP)
- Stops: 3
- Distance travelled: 109.8 km (68.2 mi)
- Average journey time: 2 hours 10 minutes
- Service frequency: Two days (Note: Runs two days in a week for every direction.)
- Train number: 11031/11032

On-board services
- Classes: First AC, AC 3 Tier, Sleeper 3 Tier, Unreserved
- Seating arrangements: No
- Sleeping arrangements: Yes
- Catering facilities: No
- Entertainment facilities: No

Technical
- Rolling stock: 2
- Track gauge: 1,676 mm (5 ft 6 in)
- Operating speed: 51 km/h (32 mph)

Solapur–Bijapur Express is an intercity train of the Indian Railways connecting Solapur in Maharashtra and Bijapur of Karnataka. It is currently being operated with 11031/11032 train numbers on a daily basis.

== Service ==
The 11031/Solapur–Bijapur Express has an average speed of 51 km/h and covers 109.8 km in 2 hrs 10 mins. 11032/Bijapur–Solapur Express has an average speed of 39 km/h and 110 km in 2 hrs 50 mins.

== Route and halts ==
The important halts of the train are:

- Solapur
- Hotgi Junction
- Indi Road
- Nimbal
- Bijapur

== Coach composition ==
The train consists of 12 coaches:

- 1 AC First-class
- 2 AC III Tier
- 4 Sleeper coaches
- 4 General
- 2 Second-class Luggage/parcel van

== Traction ==
Both trains are hauled by a Pune Loco Shed-based WDM-3D diesel locomotive from Solapur to Bijapur.

== Rake sharing ==
This train shares a with 22139/22140 Solapur–Mumbai CST Express.
