= Madha railway station =

Railway Station in Maharashtra, India

General information
- Location: Madha, Solapur, Maharashtra; India
- Coordinates: 18.0304°N 75.5464°E
- Elevation: 481 metres (1,578 ft)
- System: Indian Railways station
- Owner: Indian Railways
- Operator: Central Railway
- Platforms: 2
- Tracks: 4 (construction – doubling of diesel BG)
- Connections: Auto stand

Construction
- Structure type: Standard (on-ground station)
- Parking: No
- Cycle facilities: No

Other information
- Status: Functioning (construction – doubling of diesel BG)
- Station code: MA
- Zone(s): Central Railway
- Division(s): Solapur
Location
- Location within India Location within Maharashtra

Madha railway station is a small railway station in Solapur district, Maharashtra. Its code is MA. It serves Madha city. The station consists of two platforms, neither not well sheltered. It lacks many facilities including water and sanitation.

== Trains ==
- Mumbai–Chennai Mail
- Miraj–Solapur Special (unreserved)
- Pune–Solapur Passenger (unreserved)
- Pune–Solapur Passenger
- Siddheshwar Express
- Maharashtra Express
