= Akkalkot =

Town in Solapur, Maharashtra, India

- City
- Location in Maharashtra, India Akkalkot (India) Akkalkot (Asia)
- Coordinates: 17°31′30″N 76°12′20″E
- Country: India
- State: Maharashtra
- District: Solapur

Government
  - Type: City and Municipal Council
  - Body: Akkalkot City and Municipal council

Population (2011)
  - Total: 40,103
- Demonym: Akkalkotkar

Language
  - Official: Marathi
- Time zone: UTC+5:30 (IST)
- PIN CODE: 413216
- Vehicle registration: MH-13

Akkalkot is a city and a municipal council in Solapur district in the Indian state of Maharashtra. It is situated 38 km southeast of Solapur.

City is the home to Shri Swami Samarth, a 19th-century saint who is believed by his devotees to be an incarnation of Lord Dattatreya. Akkalkot State during the British Raj, was a princely state ruled by the royal Bhonsale dynasty.

== History ==
=== Princely Akkalkot ===
Flag of the Akkalkot state.

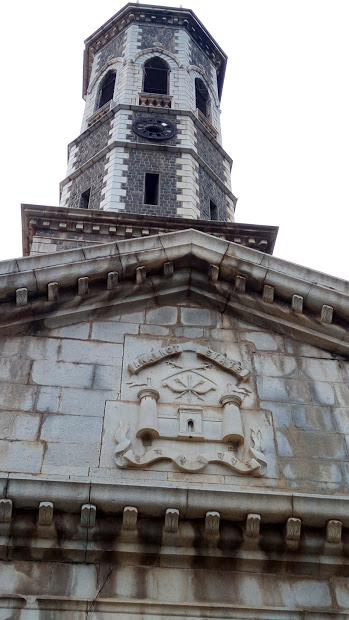
New Palace

During the British Raj, Akkalkot was a princely state of ruled by the royal Bhonsale dynasty. The non-salute state came under the Deccan States Agency and was bordered by Hyderabad State and the presidency of Bombay Presidency. The area of the state was 498 sq. miles. In 1911, the state enjoyed a revenue estimated at Rs.26,586/- and paid a tribute to the British Raj of Rs.1,000/-.Its population in 1901 was 82,047, while the population of the town itself was 8,348 in that year. The population of the state in 1921 was 81,250, comparable to 1901 but having seen 9% growth followed by decline in the intervening 20 years; the population of the town in 1921 was 9,189. Between 1901 and 1911 the state's population grew by 9%, after which it declined to 81,250 by 1921.

The Royal Armory Museum in New Palace is a popular attraction in the area. It was collected by Fattehsing Bhosle who was the ruler at Akkalkot from 1894 A.D. to 1923 A.D.

=== Religious significance ===
Akkalkot is widely known for its association with Swami Samarth, held by his devotees to be a reincarnation of Dattatreya. His temple, located in Gogaon, is the main tourist attraction in Akkalkot. Swami Samarth lived for over two decades at Akkalkot, mainly at the residence of his disciple Cholappa, where his samadhi (tomb) and shrine are now located. The shrine complex, which is known the Vatavruksh Mandir since it encloses the banyan tree beneath which the swami would preach his message, is the hub of devotions for his followers.

== Geography ==
Akkalkot taluka is bordered by South Solapur tehsil to the west and by Karnataka state on all other sides. The tehsil covers an area of 1,407 km^{2} and contains 138 villages, apart from the town. The total population of the taluka is approximately 314,570 (2011 census), giving a population density of 222 per km^{2}. Jowar, bajra and pulses are the main crops grown in the taluka. Akkalkot is routinely hit by drought as it falls in a rain shadow and also no major river pass through this taluka. Although the soil is classified as 'medium to deep black' and is of rich quality.

== Demographics ==
As of 2011 India census, Akkalkot had a population of 40,103 out of which 20,051 were male and 20,052 were female. Akkalkot has an average literacy rate of 63%, higher than the national average of 59.5%; with 59% of the males and 41% of females literate. 14% of the population is under 6 years of age.

== Education ==
Shri Shahaji High School is a 125 years old school. Karnatak Lingayat Education Society's Mangrule High school, Indian Model School Akkalkot & Kashiraya Kaka Patil High School are some of the large schools. Indian Model School is said to be best School in Akkalkot Besides C.B. Khedgi's Basaveshwar Science Raja Vijaysinh Commerce & Raja Jaysinh Arts College, Shri Vatavriksha Swami Maharaj Devashtan's Polytechnic offer higher education.

== Transport ==
It is served by Akalkot Road Railway Station which is 7 km away from the city. Chennai Mail and Udyan Express for Mumbai, Chennai Mail for Chennai, Tirupati, Mantralayam, Raichur, Gulbarga, Udyan express for Bangalore, Hyderabad Passenger for Hyderabad have stop here. It is also served by Tadawal railway station on Solapur -Hubli line around 20 km away, with trains to Bijapur, Hubli, Bagalkot, and Gadag. It is more convenient to board trains from these stations than Solapur station which is 40 km away as this saves time. There is a great demand to stop trains such as Hussainsagar Express, Dadar Chennai Egmore Express, Konark Express, Shatabdi Express, Rajkot Express, and Karnataka Express.

The nearest airport to Akkalkot is the Solapur Airport which is 31 km away. However, as of 2016 there is no scheduled commercial air service available.

== See also ==
- List of Maratha dynasties and states
- Shri Swami Samarth
