= Dadar–Chennai Egmore Express =

Train in India

Mumbai LTT–MGR Chennai Central Superfast Express

Overview
- Service type: Superfast
- First service: 26 April 1988; 38 years ago
- Current operator: Central Railway

Route
- Termini: Mumbai LTT (LTT); MGR Chennai Central (MAS)
- Stops: 24
- Distance travelled: 1,279 km (795 mi)
- Average journey time: 21 Hours 50 Minutes
- Service frequency: Daily
- Train number: 12163 / 12164

On-board services
- Classes: AC 2 Tier, AC 3 Tier, Sleeper Class, General Unreserved
- Seating arrangements: Yes
- Sleeping arrangements: Yes
- Catering facilities: Available
- Observation facilities: Large Windows
- Baggage facilities: Available
- Other facilities: Below the seats

Technical
- Rolling stock: LHB coach
- Track gauge: 1,676 mm (5 ft 6 in)
- Operating speed: 130 km/h (81 mph) maximum, 58 km/h (36 mph) average including halts.
Route map
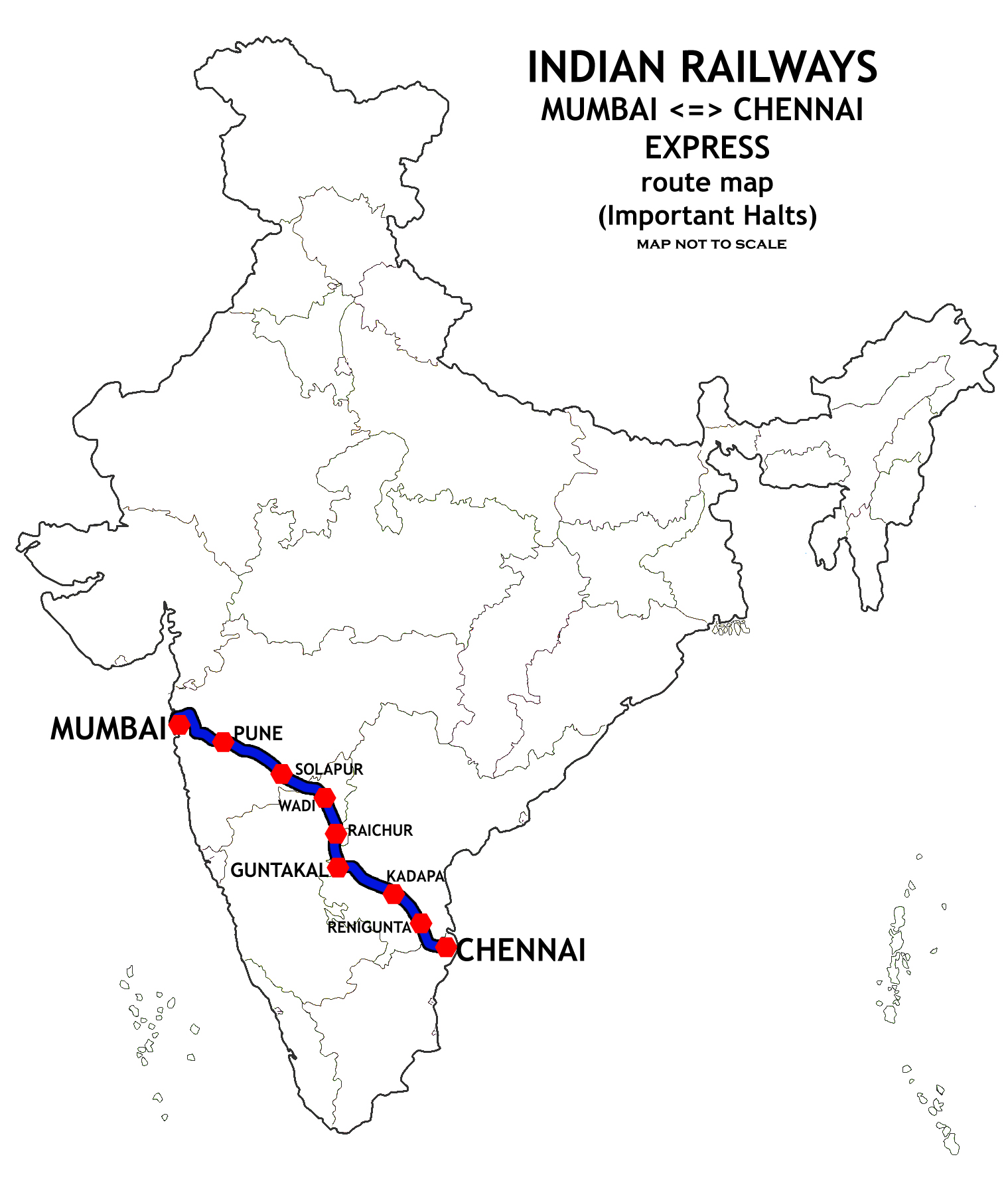

The 12163 / 12164 Mumbai LTT–MGR Chennai Central Superfast Express is a Superfast Express train belonging to Indian Railways – Central Railways zone that runs between Lokmanya Tilak Terminus and Chennai Central in India. Its terminal was changed in both directions from Dadar to Lokmanya Tilak Terminus and to Chennai Central from Chennai Egmore.

It operates as train number 12163 from Lokmanya Tilak Terminus to Chennai Central and as train number 12164 in the reverse direction serving the states of Maharashtra, Karnataka, Andhra Pradesh and Tamil Nadu. The train now departs from Lokmanya Tilak Terminus from 1 July 2020 and arrives at Chennai Central.

== Coaches ==
As with most train services in India, Coach Composition may be amended at the discretion of Indian Railways depending on demand.

== Coach composition (Downward – 12163) ==
The train consists of:

- 1 AC Two Tier
- 6 AC Three Tier coaches
- 8 Sleeper Class
- 4 General Unreserved
- 1 AC Hot Buffet Car (Pantry)
- 1 High Capacity Parcel Van (HCPV)
- 1 End On Generator
- 1 SLR

Loco	1	2	3	4	5	6	7	8	9	10	11	12	13	14	15	16	17	18	19	20	21	22	23
	HCPV	SLR	GS	GS	A1	B6	B5	B4	B3	B2	B1	PC	S8	S7	S6	S5	S4	S3	S2	S1	GS	GS	EOG

== Service ==
The 12163/64 Mumbai Lokmanya Tilak Terminus – Chennai Central Superfast Express covers a distance of 1267 kilometres in 21 hours 30 mins as 12163 Mumbai Lokmanya Tilak Terminus – Chennai Central Superfast Express (58 km/h) and 1267 kilometres in 21 hrs 30 mins as 12164 Chennai Central – Mumbai Lokmanya Tilak Terminus Superfast Express (58 km/h).

As the average speed of the train is above 55 km/h, as per Indian Railways rules, its fare includes a superfast surcharge.

== Routing ==
The 12163/64 Mumbai Lokmanya Tilak Terminus – Chennai Central Superfast Express runs via Kalyan Junction railway station, Pune, Solapur Junction, Adoni, Guntakal Junction, Renigunta Junction to Chennai Central.

== Traction ==
It is hauled by a Royapuram Loco Shed / Ajni Loco Shed / Kalyan Loco Shed-based WAP-7 electric locomotive throughout its journey.

== Timings ==
12163 Mumbai Lokmanya Tilak Terminus – Chennai Central Superfast Express leaves Lokmanya Tilak Terminus Everyday at 18:40 hrs IST and reaches Chennai Central at 16:10 hrs IST the next day.

12164 Chennai Central – Mumbai Lokmanya Tilak Terminus Superfast Express leaves Chennai Central everyday at 18:25 hrs IST and reaches Lokmanya Tilak Terminus at 15:55 hrs IST the next day.

Shares 6 Rakes with 20103/20104 Mumbai LTT – Gorakhpur SF Express (Via Kanpur) aka Sant Kabir Dham Express.
