= Maindargi =

- Town
- Nickname: Maindargi
- Location in Maharashtra, India
- Coordinates: 17.47°N 76.3°E
- Country: India
- State: Maharashtra
- District: Solapur
- Elevation: 473 m (1,552 ft)

Population (2001)
  - Total: 11,754
- Demonym: Maindargikar

Language
  - Official: Marathi
- Time zone: UTC+5:30 (IST)
- Postal code: 413217
- Vehicle registration: MH-13
- Website: www.maindargi.org

Maindargi (IPA:Maindargī) is a town and a municipal council in Akkalkot taluka of Solapur district in the Indian state of Maharashtra. In Maindargi there is the Shree Shivachaleshwar Temple.

== Geography ==
Maindargi is located at 17.47°N 76.3°E. It has an average elevation of 473 metres (1551 feet).

== Demographics ==
As of 2001 India census, Maindargi had a population of 11,754. Males constitute 51% of the population and females 49%. Maindargi has an average literacy rate of 58%, lower than the national average of 59.5%: male literacy is 70%, and female literacy is 46%. In Maindargi, 15% of the population is under six years of age.
