= Tulsidas Jadhav =

Indian activist

Tulsidas Jadhav / Tulshidas Jadhav
- Born: 25 January 1905; Dahitane, Solapur, British India
- Died: 11 September 1999 (aged 94); Mumbai, India
- Occupation: Independence activist
- Known for: Freedom fighter, social reformer, Gandhian

Tulsidas Jadhav (25 January 1905 – 11 September 1999) was an Indian freedom fighter, political activist, social worker, farmer and member of Bombay Legislative Council and Lok Sabha.

== Early life ==
Tulsidas Subhanrao Jadhav was born on 25 January 1905 Dahitane village, Tal.-Barshi, Solapur district and was educated at Haribhai Deokarn High School, Solapur.

== Family ==
He married Janabai Tulsidas Jadhav in 1913. He had two sons and four daughters. His daughter Kalavati was married to Babasaheb Bhosale, who later became Chief Minister of Maharashtra. His other daughter Nirmalatai Shankarrao Thokal was an MLA, representing Solapur City South constituency in 1972.

== Profession ==
He was an agriculturist or farmer by profession. He also established Bhogawati Sahakari Sugar Factory, also known as Santanath Sugars, based in Santanath Nagar, Vairag, Tal. Barahi, Solapur District, which is the earliest sugar factory in the Solapur region and one of the earliest in Maharashtra.

== Political life ==
He was associated with Indian National Congress from 1921 to 1947 and was one of the active freedom fighters from Solapur. When Mahatma Gandhi initiated his Salt Satyagraha in 1930 young workers like Krisnaji Bhimrao Antrolikar, Tulsidas Jadhav and Jajuji became active politically and were staunch followers of the Gandhian philosophy. He was imprisoned in 1931, 1932, 1941 and 1942.

- From 1937-1939, 1946-1951 and 1951-57 he was a member of Bombay Legislative Assembly.

Once during a satyagraha, an officer put a pistol on his chest and ordered his to leave but he refused to do so, shaking off the threat. He was closely associated with Mahatma Gandhi and served as his secretary, when in Yerwada prison in 1932.

After independence, he left Congress in 1947 and with some other ex-congressman and formed the Peasants and Workers Party of India, of which he was one of founder members.

- He won the 1951 Bombay Assembly Election from Barshi-Madha constituency.

In 1957 he again joined Congress with his other PWP colleagues, including Keshavrao Jedhe, Shankarrao More.

- He was given congress ticket but was lost in 1957 elections for 2nd Lok Sabha from Solapur constituency.
- He was elected as a member of 3rd Lok Sabha from Nanded from 1962–67 and as a member of the 4th Lok Sabha from Baramati as a Congress candidate.

He was at times vocal opponent of Yashwantrao Chavan in many matters of policies and decisions for which in 1971 elections he was denied election ticket. He was part of radical camp in Maharashtra Congress of which other politicians included Shankarrao More and R. K. Khadlikar.

He also served as Parliamentary Committees on Draft Third Five Year Plan. Among others he served also as a member of the Maharashtra Pradesh Congress Committee and was its General Secretary - 1957—60. He gave his services as a member of the Electricity Consultative Committee, T.B. Board, Leprosy Committee; Study Group on Road Safety In 1985, he was signatory to the "Apostle of Peace" award which was recognized by Giani Zail Singh, President of India from 1982-1987, Dr. S. S. Mohapatra, Secretary General of India, and Tulsidas Jadhav, who at that time was President of the Parliamentary Center.

== Social reformer ==
As a social reformer, he worked relentlessly for the upliftment of Harijan and Dalit communities beginning since decades of 1930 till his active life.

== Death ==
He died on 11 September 1999 at Mumbai.

== Memorials ==
- In February 2009 a statue of Tulsidas Jadhav was erected at Mechanic Chowk to acknowledge his bravery, when for three days, from 9 to 11 May 1930, law and order in the town was maintained by Tulsidas, when all police officers in the town had deserted their posts. It was inaugurated by Sharad Pawar and Sushil Kumar Shinde.
- Tulsidas Jadhav Adhyapak Vidhyalay at Sholapur is a teacher's training school named after him.
- Maharashtrache shilpkaar - Tulsidas Jadhav(महाराष्ट्राचे शिल्पकार - तुलसीदास जाधव) is a biography published by Maharashtra Rajya Sahitya ani Sanskruti Mandal authored by Vyankatesh Kamatkar.
