= Bale railway station =

Railway Station in Maharashtra, India

Bale

General information
- Location: Bale Railway Station, Solapur, Maharashtra - 413002; India
- Coordinates: 17°39′50″N 75°53′35″E
- System: Indian Railway Station
- Owner: Indian Railways
- Operator: Central Railway
- Line: Solapur – Pune
- Platforms: 1
- Tracks: 2

Construction
- Parking: yes
- Cycle facilities: yes
- Accessible: yes

Other information
- Status: Functioning
- Station code: BALE
- Division(s): Solapur
Location
- Location within India Location within Maharashtra

Bale is a small railway station in the Bale area of Solapur, Maharashtra, India.

Only the Solapur – Pune passenger train stops here.
