= Solapur railway division =

Railway division of India

Solapur railway division is one of the five railway divisions under the jurisdiction of Central Railway zone of the Indian Railways. It is the largest division in Central Railway, covering 10 districts of Maharashtra, Karnataka and Telangana.

The option of an Ahmednagar Karmala railway line is also being explored.

== List of railway stations and towns ==
The list includes the stations under the Solapur CR division and their station category .

Category of station	No. of stations	Names of stations
A-1	2	Solapur, Kalaburagi Junction
A	6	Latur, Kurduvadi, Ahmednagar, Sainagar Shirdi and Osmanabad
B	3	Wadi Junction, Pandharpur, Barshi
C (suburban station)	2	Hotgi Junction, Tikekarwadi, Pakni, Bale
D	7	-
E	57	-
F (halt station)	20	-
Total	96	-

== Routes ==
- Daund Jn (exclude) - Kurudwadi Jn - Solapur
- Miraj Jn(exclude) - Pandharpur - Kurduwadi Jn -Barshi - Osmanabad - Latur - Latur Road(exclude)
- Solapur - Hotgi Jn - Gulburga - Wadi Jn (include)
