= Solapur–Hassan Express =

Train in India

Solapur–Hassan Superfast Express
Overview
- Service type: Express
- First service: Inaugural 12 September 2012; 14 years ago, Extended upto Hassan Junction on 13 June 2018; 8 years ago
- Current operator: Central Railway

Route
- Termini: Solapur (SUR); Hassan Junction (HAS)
- Stops: 15
- Distance travelled: 830 km (516 mi)
- Average journey time: 15h 36m
- Service frequency: Daily (Note: Runs seven days in a week for every direction.)
- Train number: 11311 / 11312

On-board services
- Classes: AC first, AC 2 tier, AC 3 tier, Sleeper class, General Unreserved
- Seating arrangements: Yes
- Sleeping arrangements: Yes
- Catering facilities: On-board catering, E-catering
- Observation facilities: Large windows
- Baggage facilities: No
- Other facilities: Below the seats

Technical
- Rolling stock: LHB coach
- Track gauge: 1,676 mm (5 ft 6 in)
- Operating speed: 53 km/h (33 mph) average including halts

The 11311 / 11312 Solapur–Hassan Express (previously 22133/22134 Solapur-Yesvantpur Superfast Express) is an Express train belonging to Central Railway zone that runs between Solapur and Hassan Junction in India. It is currently being operated with 11311/11312 train numbers on a daily basis.

== Service ==
The 11311/Solapur–Hassan Express has an average speed of 52 km/h and covers 830 km in 16h 5m. The 11312/Hassan–Solapur Express has an average speed of 50 km/h and covers 830 km in 16h 30m.

== Route and halts ==
The important halts of the train are:

- Solapur
- Kalaburagi Junction
- Wadi Junction
- Yadgir
- Raichur Junction
- Guntakal Junction
- Anantapur
- Dharmavaram Junction
- Yelahanka Junction
- Yesvantpur Junction
- Hassan Junction.

== Coach composition ==
The train has standard LHB rakes with max speed of 110 kmph. The train consists of 21 coaches:

- 1 First AC and AC II Tier
- 3 AC II Tier
- 3 AC III Tier
- 9 Sleeper coaches
- 3 General Unreserved
- 1 SLR
- 1 EOG

== Traction ==
Both trains are hauled by a Krishnarajapuram Loco Shed based WAP-7 electric locomotive from Solapur to Yesvantpur, and then handing over to a Krishnarajapuram Loco Shed based WDP-4D diesel locomotive from Yesvantpur to Hassan and vice versa.

== See also ==
- Solapur railway station
- Yesvantpur Junction railway station
- Hassan Junction railway station

== Notes ==
This train service was inaugurated by Dr Mallikarjun Kharge who was Minister of Railway this train was especially for the people who want to travel from Gulbarga to Bangalore. There was shortage of trains on this route and especially Gulbarga people which was a big issue for them
