= Swami Samarth =

Indian Hindu spiritual guru (died 1878)

Swami Samarth श्री स्वामी समर्थ
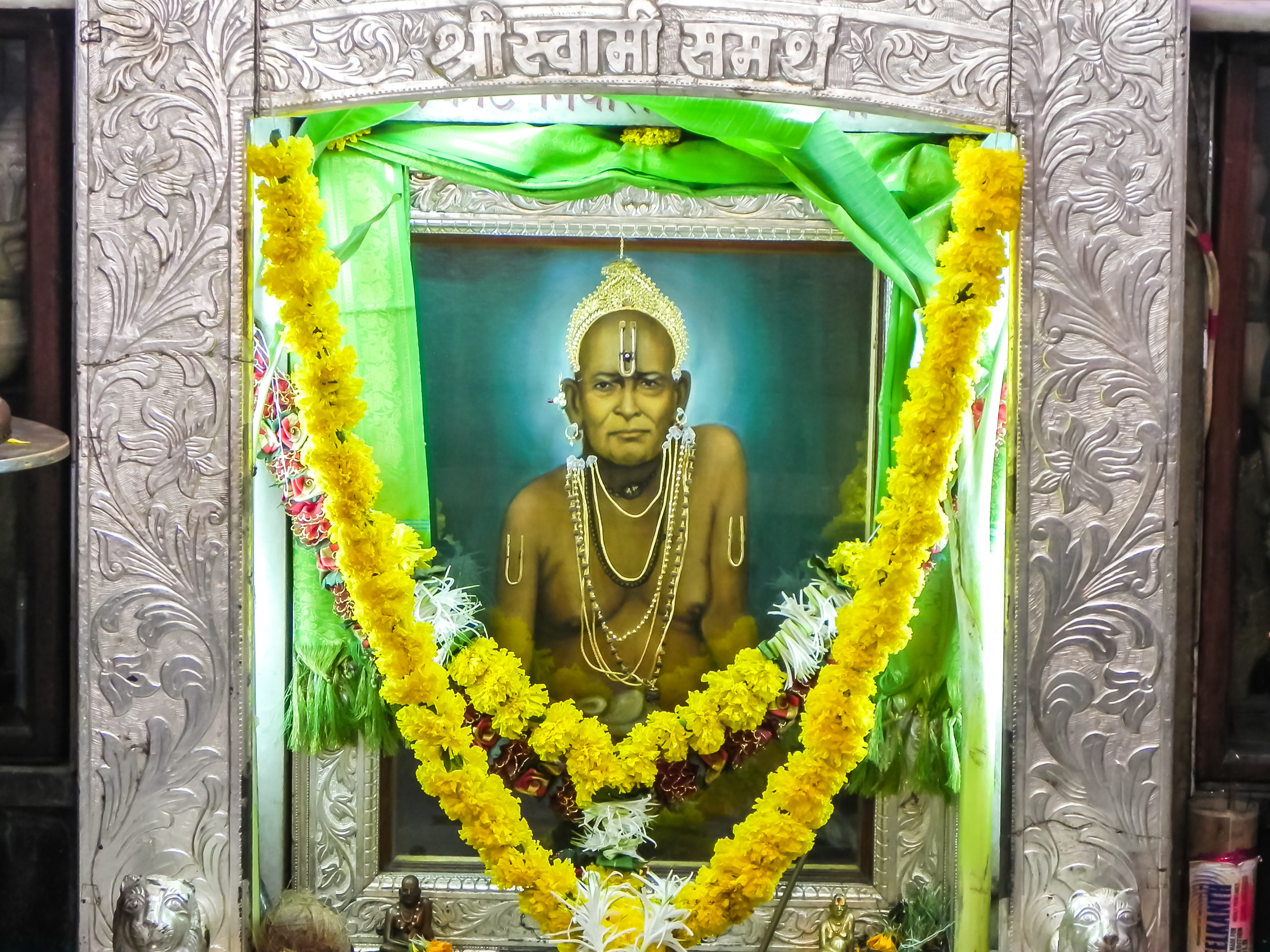
- Title: Swami Samarth of Akkalkot

Personal life
- Born: Nrusimha Bhan Kardali van, Andhra Pradesh
- Resting place: Akkalkot, Solapur district, India (present-day Maharashtra, India)

Religious life
- Religion: Hinduism

Religious career
- Based in: Akkalkot, Maharashtra, India
- Disciples: Balappa Maharaj, Cholappa Maharaj, Nrusimha Saraswati Maharaj of Alandi, Anandnath Maharaj of Vengurla, Swamisut Maharaj of Mumbai, Shankar Maharaj of Pune, Ramanand Beedkar Maharaj of Pune
- Influenced: Shankar Maharaj

Quotation

Don't be afraid, I shall always be with you
भिऊ नकोस, मी तुझ्या पाठीशी आहे

Shri Swami Samarth Maharaj (Marathi: श्री स्वामी समर्थ) also known as Swami of Akkalkot, was an Indian Hindu spiritual master of the Dattatreya Tradition. He lived during the nineteenth century and is a known spiritual figure in various Indian states including Karnataka and Maharashtra. Swami Samarth traveled all across the Indian subcontinent and eventually set his abode at Akkalkot, a village in present-day Solapur District in Maharashtra. He is thought to have arrived at Akkalkot on a Wednesday, during either September or October in 1856. He resided at Akkalkot for close to 22 years.

Swami Samartha took a samadhi on April 30, 1878 as per the Gregorian calendar and on Chaitra Suddha Trayodasi, Shaka 1800 as per the Hindu Calendar. His teachings continue to be followed by millions of people in Maharashtra, and his ashram in Akkalkot remains a popular place of pilgrimage.

== Origin and legend ==
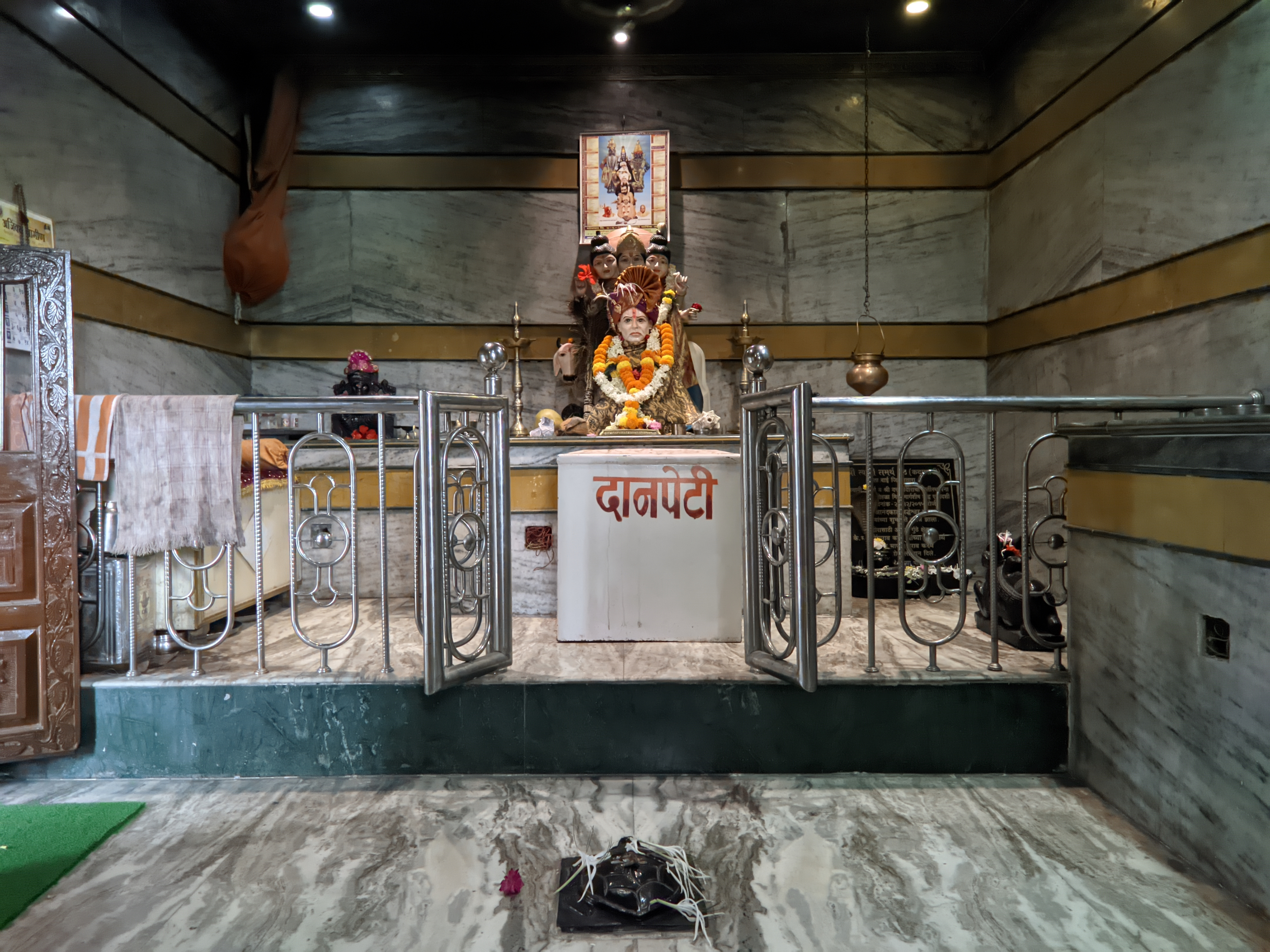
Swami Samarth Math in Maharashtra.

Swami Samarth's parentage and origins remain obscure. According to a legend, once when a disciple asked Swami a question about his birth, Swami responded that he had originated from a banyan tree (vata-vriksha in Marathi). On another occasion, Swami had said that his earlier name was Nrusimha Bhan.

He is considered to be the fourth (third in physical form) incarnation of Dattatreya, the Lord Almighty. He is also believed to be a reincarnation of Narasimha Saraswati, another earlier spiritual master of the Dattatreya sect.

== Life ==
According to Swami Samarth himself, he had originally appeared in the Kardali forests near Srisailam, a Hindu holy town in present-day Andhra Pradesh. Swami Samarth was from Andhra Pradesh later he migrated to different places. He might have moved through Tibet and Nepal during his travels across the Himalayas and its adjacent regions. He is also believed to have visited various Indian regions such as Puri, Varanasi (also Kashi), Haridwar, Girnar, Kathiawar and Rameswaram. He might have also briefly lived at Mangalvedha, a town near Pandharpur in present-day Solapur district, Maharashtra. He finally settled at Akkalkot.

Swami Samarth is also believed to have visited Maniknagar, Karnataka to meet Manik Prabhu, an Indian saint and mystic considered to be another incarnation of Dattatreya. According to the Shree Manik Prabhu Charitra (biography), Swami resided at Maniknagar for around six months. During this period, Manik Prabhu and Swami Samarth often sat under a cluster fig tree (Audumbar in Marathi) and had conversations on profound spirituality. It is claimed that Swami Samarth regarded Manik Prabhu as a brother.

Swami Samarth probably arrived at Akkalkot in 1856 on receiving an invitation from Chintopant Tol and then stayed on the outskirts of the town for about 22 years. He lived at the residence of his disciple Cholappa, where his shrine is presently located.

A common mantra commemorating Swami Samarth is read as "Aum Abhayadata Shree Swamisamarthaya Namaha". His first biography was written by Sakharam Balkrishna Sarnaik (Chambalikar) named as Shripadbhushan in 1871 followed by Sant Wamanbhau Maharaj's Shree Guruleelamrut written in 1872.

== See also ==
- Akkalkot
- Dindori
- Gogaon, Akkalkot

== Sources ==
- The Supreme Master (Swami Samartha's Comprehensive Biography).
- 'Shreepadbhushan' by Sakharam Balkrishna Sarnaik (Chambalikar), first biography of Swami Samarth published on 19 May 1871 (Shalivahan Shaka 1973, Prajapatinam Samvatsar, Vaishakhi Amavasya).
- Shri Dattatreya Dnyankosh by Dr. P. N. Joshi (Shri Dattateya Dnyankosh Prakashan, Pune, 2000).
- "Shri Swami Samarth Nityakram aani Upasana"(in Marathi) by Dr. N.S. Kunte (Shri Vatvruksh Swami Samarth Maharaj Devsthan, Akkalkot, 2000).
- Datta-Sampradyacha Itihas (History of Datta Sampradaya) by Dr. R. C. Dhere (Padmagnadha Prakashan, Pune).
- Shri GuruCharitra (Sri Gurucharitra) (new, abbreviated version)
- Shri Akkalkotniwasi Swami Maharaj yanche Charitra by G. V. Mulekar
- Shri Akkalkot Swami Maharaj Charitra by R. S. Sahasrabuddhe.
- "Pesum Deivam" – Akkalkot Maharaj Arulaatchi – Tamil Version by"Swamy Suthan" Dr.J.S.Sayikumar +91 86085 06816

=== Additional publications ===
- Hanumante, Mukund M. (1999, 2000). A Glimpse of Divinity: Shri Swami Samarth Maharaj of Akkalkot, ISBN 978-0-9669943-0-8
- Kulkarni, Shriram A. (2001). Shri Swami Samarth Maharaj of Akkalkot: Ashttotarshat Namavali: Vicharmanthan Sar (Marathi)
- Kulkarni, Shriram A. (2000). Shri Swami Samarth Maharaj of Akkalkot: Bhagwat Chaitanyache Shalaka Darshan(Marathi)
- Oza, Kaushik (2007). Shri Swami Samarth Maharaj of Akkalkot: Bhagwat Chaitanyache Shalaka Darshan (Gujrati)
- Patil, Rajgouda (2012) Shri Swami Samarth Maharaj of Akkalkot: Bhagwat Chaitanyada Kshana Darshan (Kannada)
- Patil, Rajgouda (2017) "Amrutada Anjali": Shri Swami Samarth Maharajar sanketi vakyagal vivrane (Kannada)
- Patil, Rajgouda (2021) "Sakh Nirantar": Shri Swami Samarth Maharajar, Akkalkot (Kannada)
- Kulkarni, Shriram A. "Amrutachi Wonzali" (Marathi)
- Joshi, Vasant G. (2006). Sulabh Shri Dnyaneshwari(Marathi) (Financial Sponsorship)
- Kulkarni, Shriram A. (2007). Sarth Shrimat Gurucharitra: Sulabh Marathi Bhavarthasaha(Financial Sponsorship)
- Shri Gurucharitra, 14th Chapter in English & Marathi, 2009.
- Swami Tava Charanam Sharanam, Audio CD of Melodious Divine Songs, 2009.
- Hanumante, Mukund M. (2010). Eternal Friend: Shri Swami Samarth Maharaj of Akkalkot
- Ekkirala Bharadwaja
- Kaliyugi Shri Swami Samarth Charitra Tatva Rahasya (Marathi Granth)
- A short biography of Akkalkot Niwasi Shree Swami Samarth Maharaj by Shree Vitthalrao Joshi Charities Trust
