= Gogaon, Akkalkot =

Village in Maharashtra

Gogaon is a small village located in Akkalkot, Solapur district, Maharashtra, India. It is mainly famous for God Shree Swami Samartha Temple, which is at Kulkarni's Farm.
