= Dahitane =

- Village
- Location in Maharashtra, India Dahitane (India)
- Coordinates: 18.0079127°N 75.7683995°E
- Country: India
- State: Maharashtra
- District: Solapur
- Taluka: Barshi

Government
  - Type: Grampanchyat
  - Body: GP
  - Sarpanch: Mrs. Pooja Pandurang Dahitankar (NCP)

Population
  - Total: 2,000
- Demonym: Jadhav(Maratha) Kashid (Maratha)
- Time zone: UTC+5:30 (IST)
- PIN: 413412
- Area code: +91-0284
- Vehicle registration: MH-13
- Lok Sabha constituency: 40-Usmanabad
- Vidhan Sabha constituency: 246-Barshi
- Official language: Marathi

Dahitane is a village in the Barshi Taluka of Solapur district in Maharashtra, India. It is a village panchayat located between the town of Vairag and the tehsil of Mohol.

== Geography ==
Dahitane is located around 39.7 kilometres away from its district headquarter Solapur. The other nearest district headquarters is Osmanabad situated at 33.0 km distance from Dahitane. Surrounding districts from Dahitane are as follows.

- Osmanabad district 33.0 km
- Latur district 96.7 km
- Beed district 101.2 km
- Sangali district 199 km

Dahitane is located 328.5 kilometres away from Mumbai, its state capital, but lies geographically closer to Hyderabad (295.1 km), the state capital of neighbouring Telangana.

=== Yatra Festival ===
Every Year as per Marathi Calendar Third Thursday in Margashish months Big Festival God of Dahitane Shri. Changdev Patil Maharaj.

=== Rivers ===
- Nagziri River

== Languages ==
The native language of Dahitane is Marathi and most of the village people speak Marathi. Dahitane people use Marathi language for communication.

== Transport ==
=== Road ===
Dahitane is Located on Vairag-Mohol Road and is served by various bus stations:

- Vairag Bus Station 7.0 km: MSRTC buses run hourly from Vairag via Dahitane to Mohol in both directions from 6:10 a.m. to 7:15 pm.
- Mohol Bus Station 29.0 km
- Barshi Bus Station 29.0 km
- Solapur Bus Station 47.0 km
- Tuljapur Bus Station 42.0 km
- Dharashiv (Osmanabad) Bus Station 57.0 km

=== Rail ===
The nearest railway station to Dahitane is Malikpeth, which is 21.6 kilometres away. The following list shows other railway stations and their distance from Dahitane.

- Barshi railway station 32.5 km
- Madha railway station 36.6 km
- Mohol railway station 34.7 km

=== Air ===
Dahitane's nearest airport is Boramani International Airport situated at 59.4 km distance. Osmanabad Airport is 77.5 km away.

== Education ==
Z P School Dahitane and Changdev Patil Madyamik Vidyalay are both schools in Dahitane. There are also many colleges & schools in Vairag, 7 km away.
