= Mumbai–Chennai Mail =

Train in India

Mumbai CSMT – Chennai Egmore Superfast Mail Express
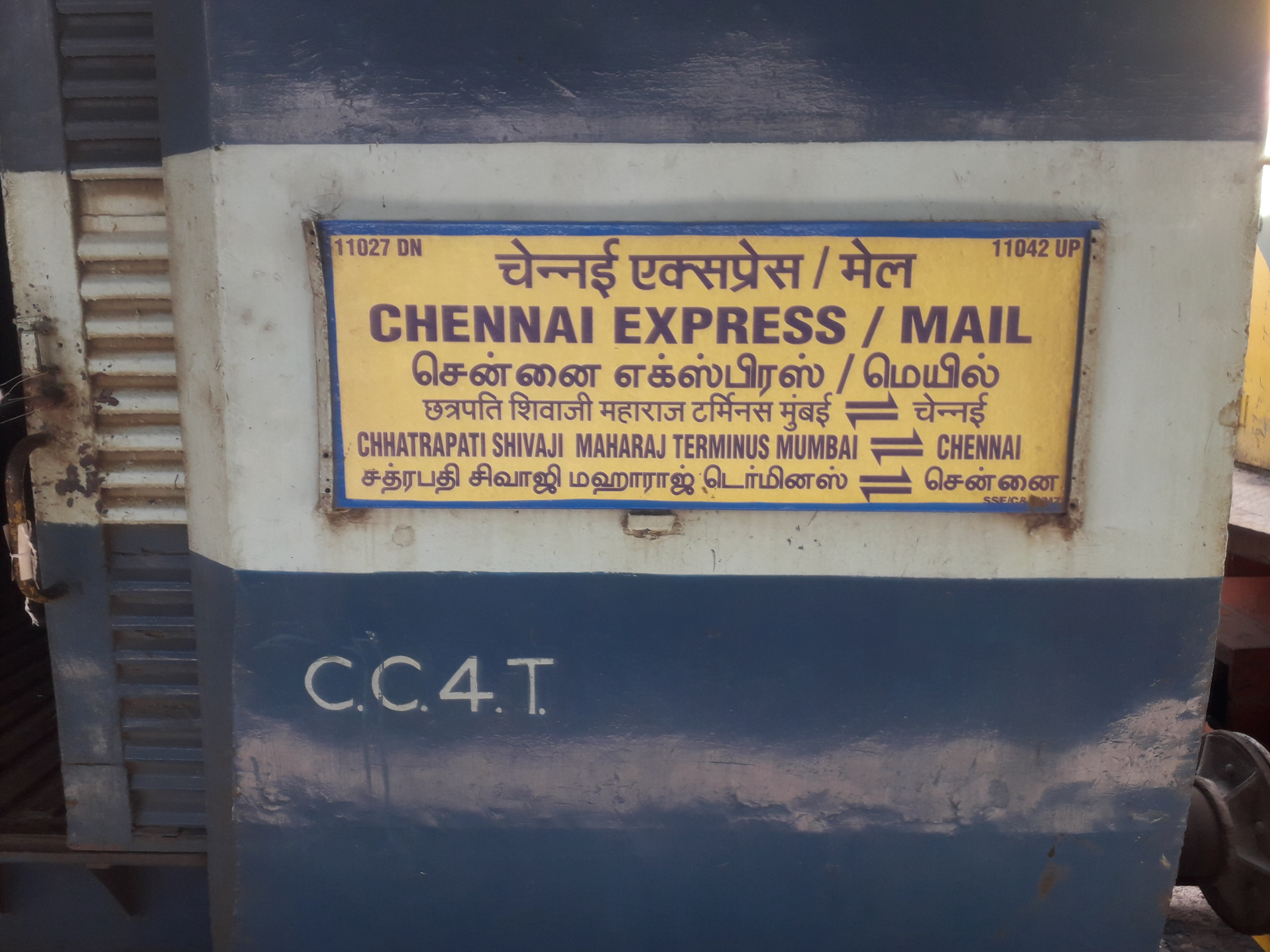
- Mumbai Mail

Overview
- Service type: Superfast
- First service: 15 March 1871; 155 years ago
- Current operator: Central Railway

Route
- Termini: Chhatrapati Shivaji Maharaj Terminus (CSMT); Chennai Egmore (MS)
- Stops: 34 as 22157, 31 as 22158
- Distance travelled: 1,289 km (801 mi)
- Average journey time: 23 hours 23 minutes as 22157 Mumbai–Chennai Mail, 23 hours 5 minutes as 22158 Chennai–Mumbai Mail
- Service frequency: Daily
- Train number: 22157 / 22158

On-board services
- Classes: AC 2 tier, AC 3 tier, Sleeper Class, General Unreserved
- Seating arrangements: Yes
- Sleeping arrangements: Yes
- Catering facilities: E-Catering available At CSMT; and every other station from Kalaburagi
- Other facilities: Bedroll given In AC Coaches

Technical
- Rolling stock: LHB coach
- Track gauge: 1,676 mm (5 ft 6 in)
- Electrification: 100%
- Operating speed: 130 km/h (81 mph) maximum 55 km/h (34 mph) including halts.
Route map
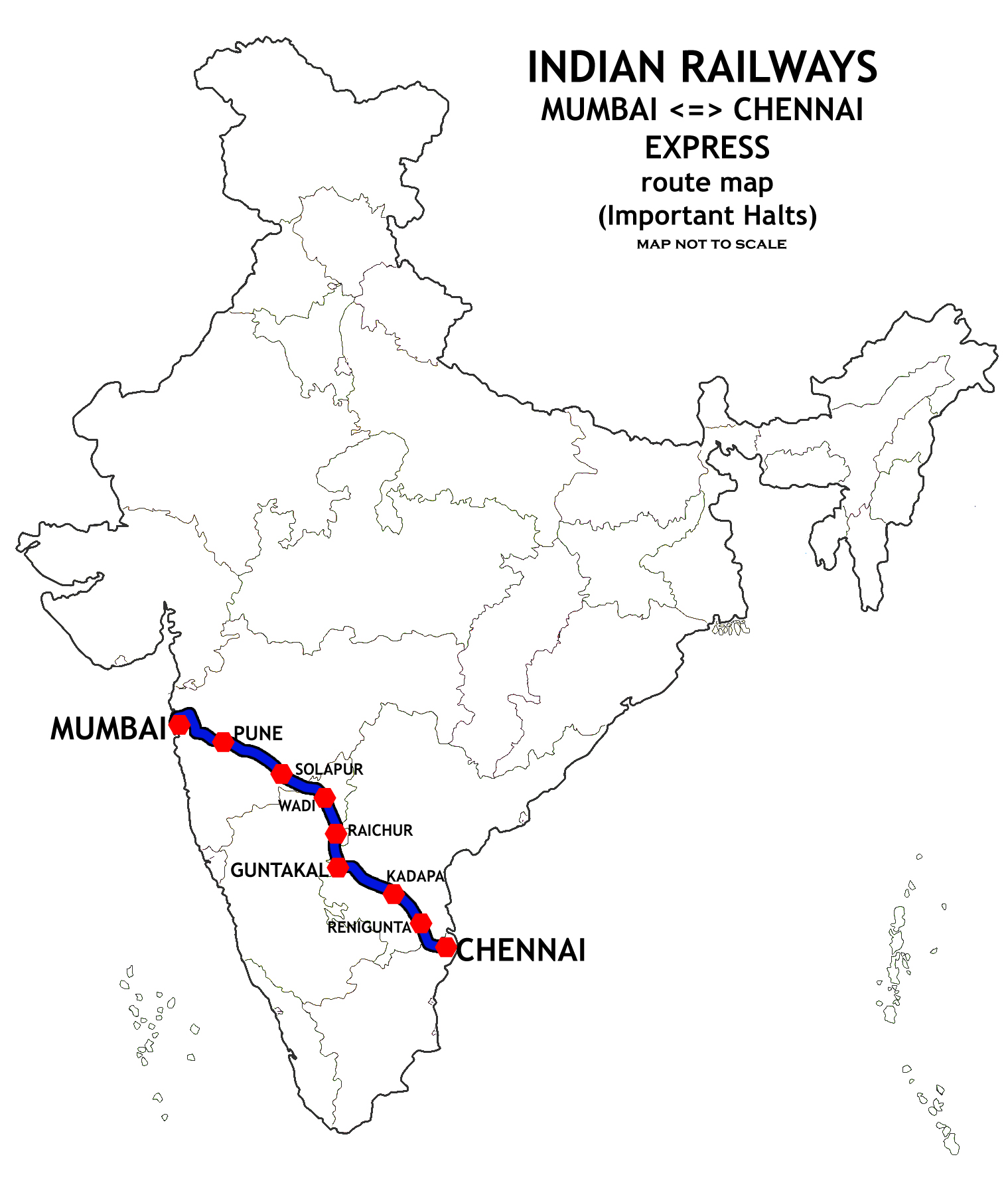
- Mumbai–Chennai Express/Mail Train Route map

The 22157 / 22158 Mumbai CSMT – Chennai Egmore Superfast Mail is a train belonging to Indian Railways – Central Railway zone that runs between Mumbai Chhatrapati Shivaji Maharaj Terminus & Chennai Egmore in India. It was earlier known as Bombay–Madras Mail.

It operates as train number 22157 from Mumbai Chhatrapati Shivaji Maharaj Terminus to Chennai Egmore and as train number 22158 in the reverse direction, serving the states of Maharashtra, Karnataka, Telangana, Andhra Pradesh & Tamil Nadu.

== History ==
The Mumbai-Chennai Mail service started on March 15, 1871 as Bombay-Madras Mail. Until 1997, this train used to cover 1,284 kilometres (798 mi) in 30 hours 00 mins via Renigunta -Guntakal line at an average speed of 42.80 km/h (27 mph) . After Guntakal - Bangalore Line was converted to Broad Gauge in 1997, the train was diverted to run via Bangalore, having a reversal there & covering 1,507 kilometres (936 mi) in 30 hours, running at an average speed of 50 km/h (31 mph) . In 2002, the route was reverted back to the Renigunta -Guntakal line. Journey took 28 hours 30 mins at an average speed of 45 km/h (28 mph). Finally in 2019, Mumbai-Chennai Mail was upgraded to Superfast express, drastically reducing journey time to 23 hrs 30 mins at average speed of 55 km/h (34 mph). As part of Indian Railways’ ongoing rolling stock modernization programme, the train was equipped with LHB coaches for the first time on 14 January 2025, replacing the long used ICF coaches. This marked a major milestone in the train’s history, bringing enhanced safety, improved ride quality, and compatibility with higher operational speeds, while continuing its legacy as a historic Mail service.

== Coach composition ==
The train consists of:

- 2 AC Two Tier
- 3 AC Three Tier coaches
- 5 Sleeper Class
- 4 General Unreserved
- 1 Sitting cum Luggage Rake
- 1 End-On-Generation, Brake Cum Luggage Car

Loco	1	2	3	4	5	6	7	8	9	10	11	12	13	14	15	16
	SLR	GS	GS	S5	S4	S3	S2	S1	B3	B2	B1	A1	A2	GS	GS	EOG

== Service ==
The 22157 Mumbai CSMT–Chennai Egmore Mail covers the distance of 1,289 km (801 mi) in 23 hours 23 mins (55 km/h) and in 23 hours 15 mins as 22158 Chennai Egmore–Mumbai CSMT Mail (55 km/h).

== Route ==
The 22157 / 22158 Mumbai CSMT–Chennai Egmore Mail runs from Chhatrapati Shivaji Maharaj Terminus (CSMT) via Kalyan Junction, Karjat, Pune Junction, Daund Junction, Solapur Junction, Kalaburagi Junction, Wadi Junction, Adoni, Guntakal Junction, Gooty Junction, Yerraguntla Junction, Kadapa, Renigunta Junction, Arakkonam Junction, Perambur to Chennai Egmore.

== Traction ==
As the entire Chennai-Mumbai line is electrified, this train is hauled end to end by a Royapuram-based WAP-7.

== Operation ==
It runs on a daily basis.

== Rake sharing ==
It shares its rakes with 22153/22154 Chennai Egmore-Salem Superfast Express.

== Gallery ==
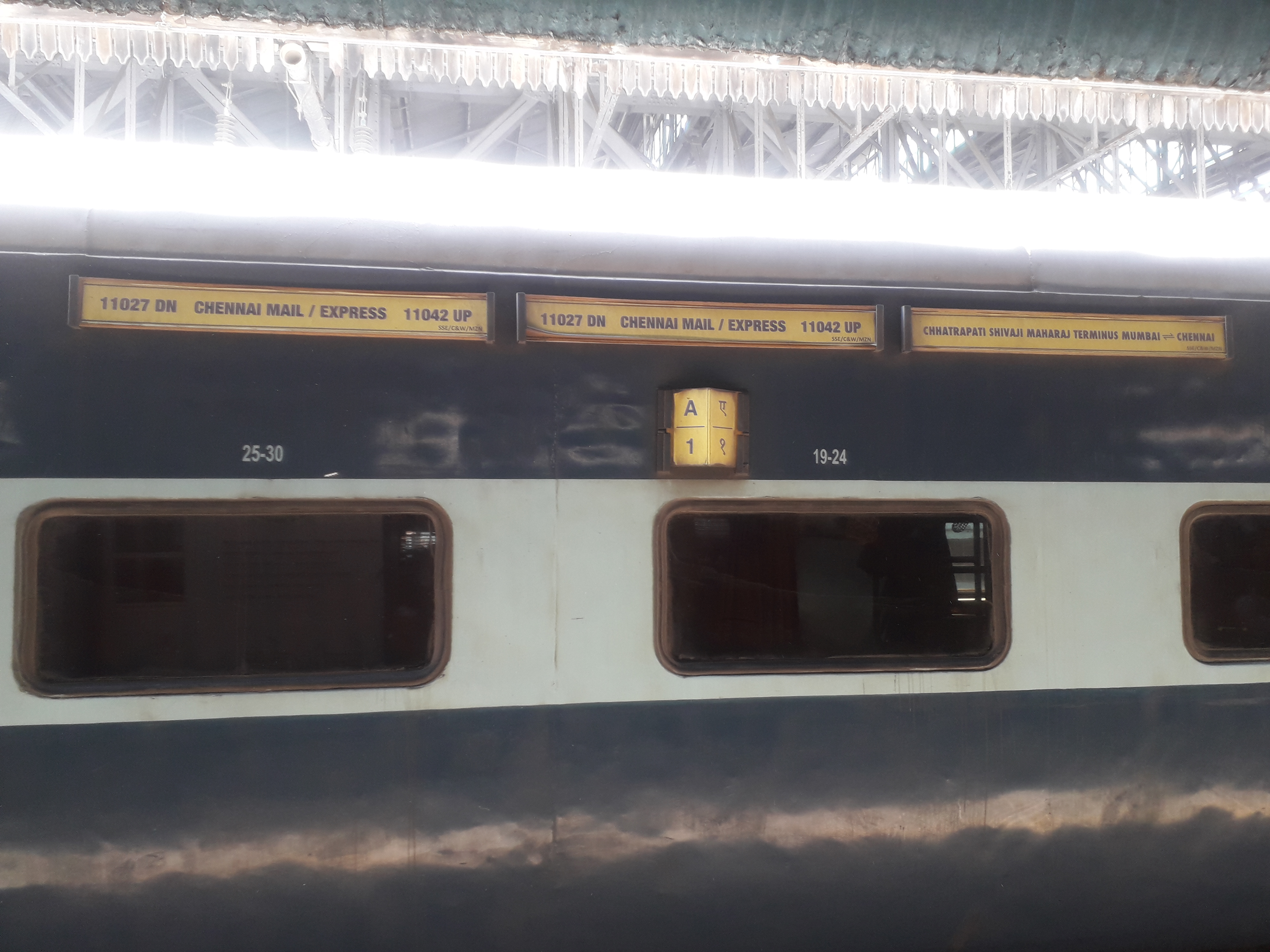
11042 Puratchi Thalaivar Dr. M.G. Ramachandran Central Railway Station–Mumbai Chhatrapati Shivaji Maharaj Terminus Express – AC 2 tier coach

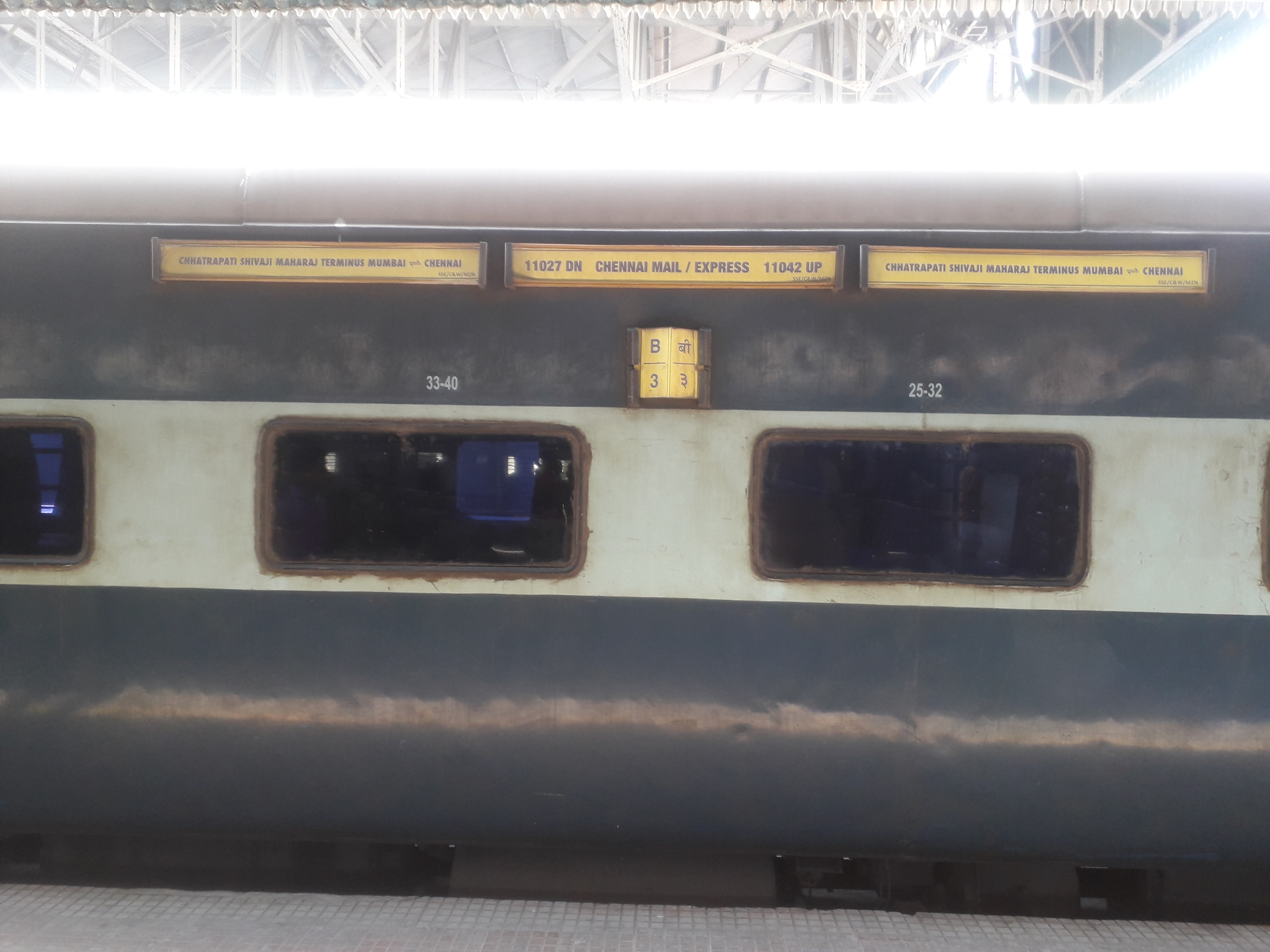
11042 Puratchi Thalaivar Dr. M.G. Ramachandran Central railway station–Mumbai Chhatrapati Shivaji Maharaj Terminus Express – AC 3 tier coach

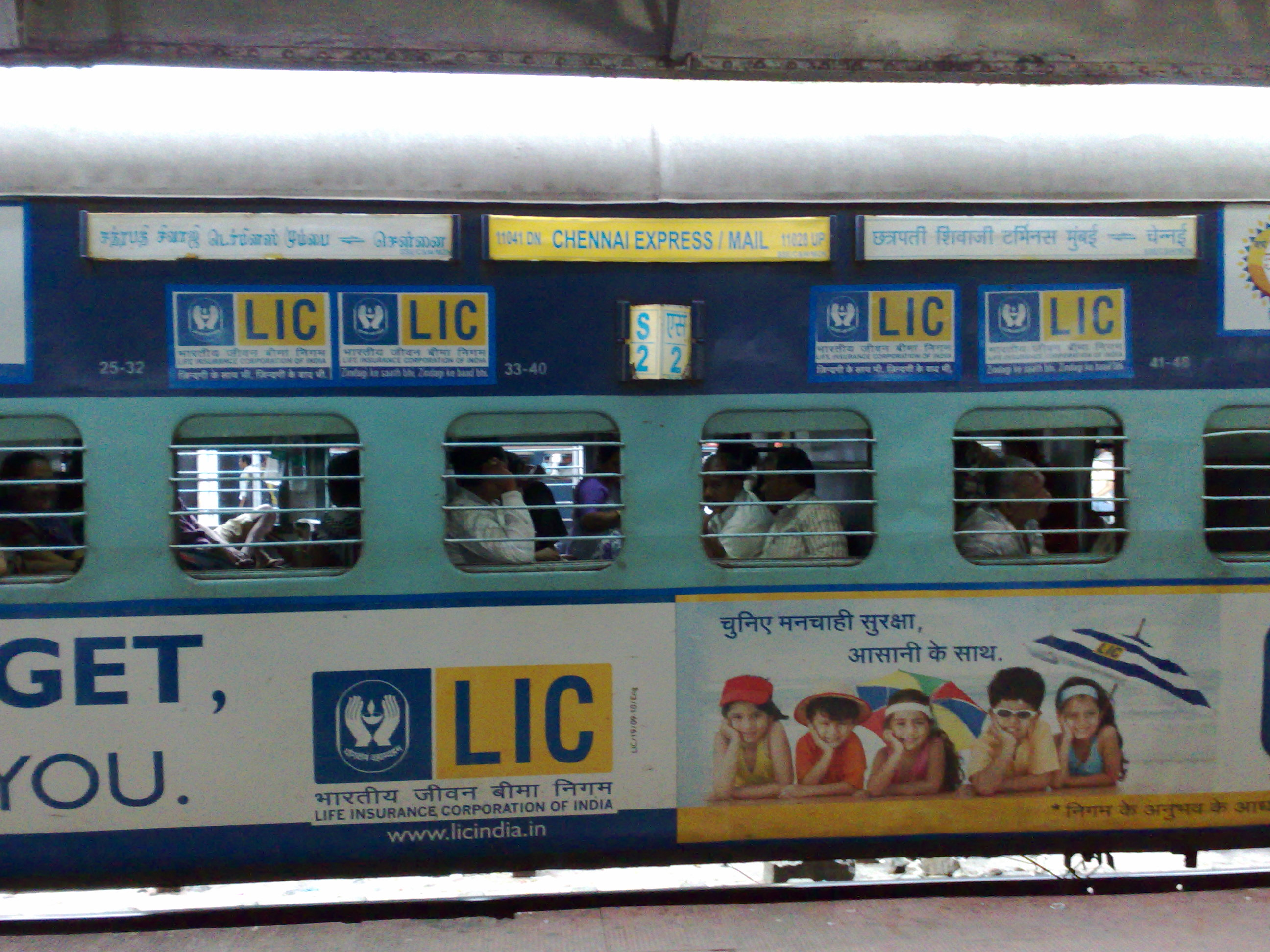
Mumbai CSMT – MGR Chennai Central Mail – Sleeper Class coach

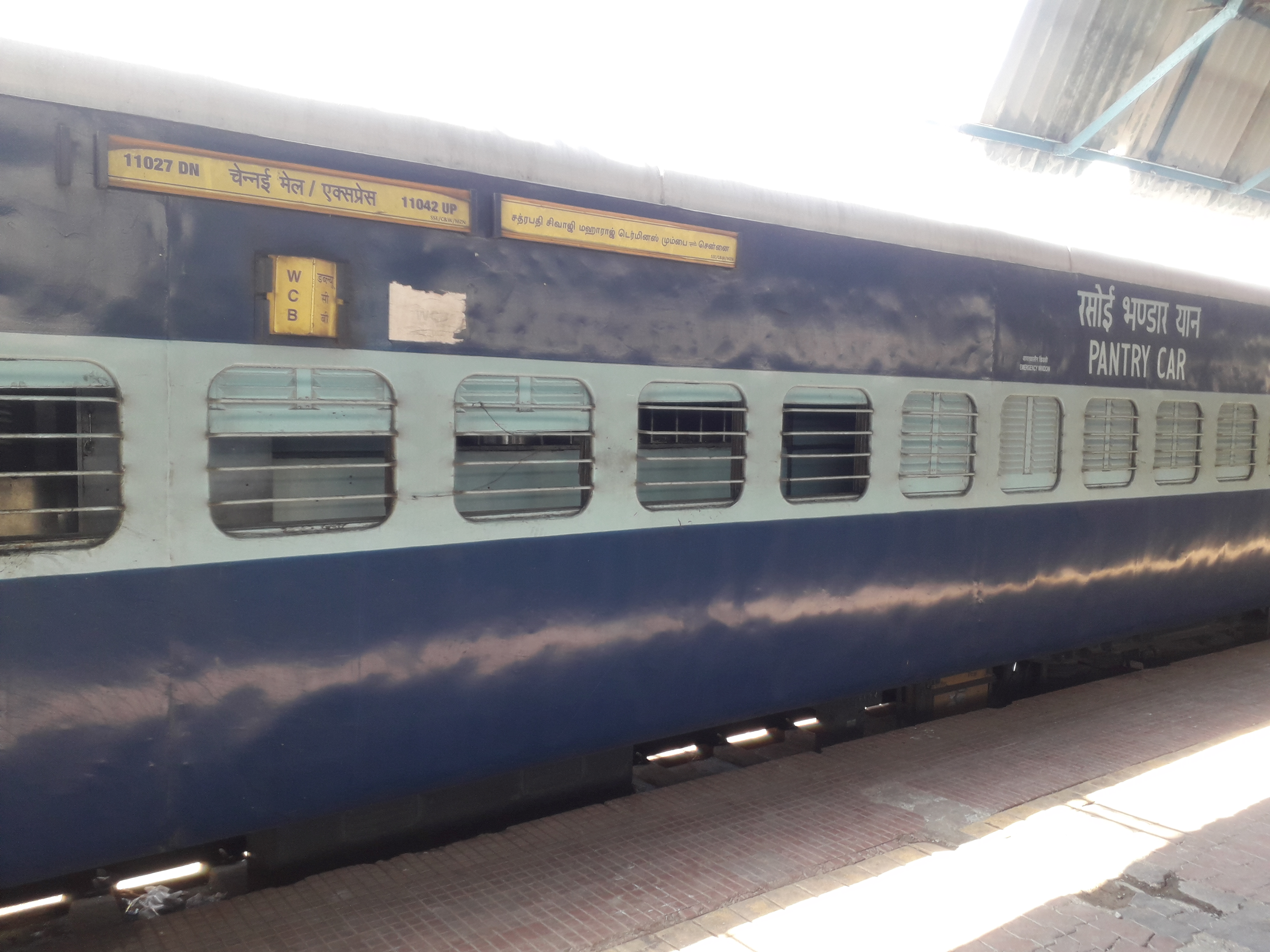
11042 Puratchi Thalaivar Dr. M.G. Ramachandran Central railway station–Mumbai Chhatrapati Shivaji Maharaj Terminus Express – Pantry coach

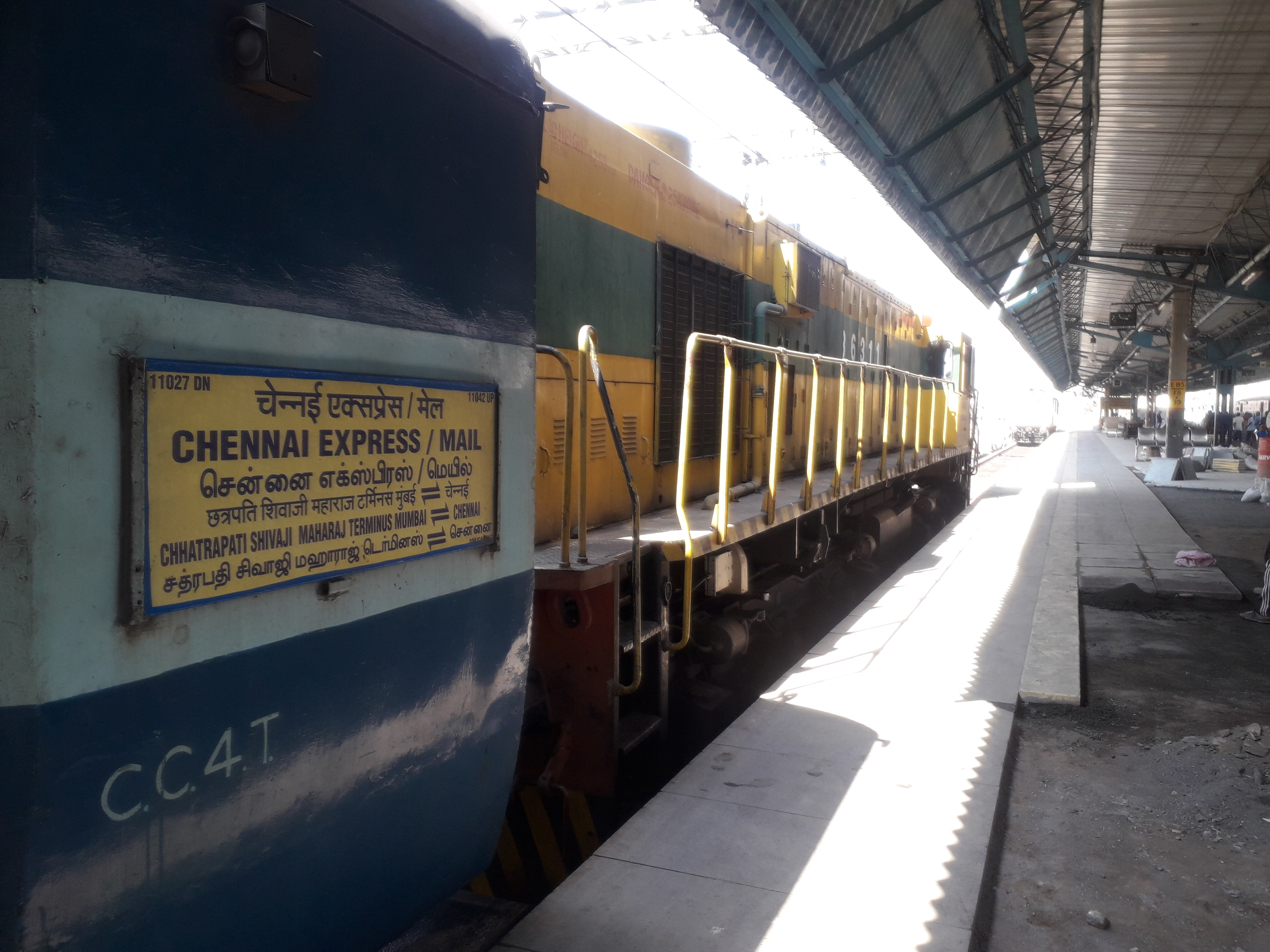
11042 Puratchi Thalaivar Dr. M.G. Ramachandran Central railway station–Mumbai Chhatrapati Shivaji Maharaj Terminus Express about to be shunted off to the marshalling yard

== See also ==
- Dedicated Intercity trains of India
- Lokmanya Tilak Terminus–Chennai Central Weekly Express
