= Solapur–Mumbai CSMT Superfast Express =

Solapur Mumbai CST Express
Overview
- Service type: Express
- First service: 27 October 2013
- Current operator: Central Railways

Route
- Termini: Mumbai CST; Solapur Junction
- Stops: 6
- Distance travelled: 455 km (283 mi)
- Average journey time: 8 hours 50 minutes as 22140 Solapur–Mumbai CST Express, 10 hours 50 minutes as 22139 Mumbai CST–Solapur Express
- Service frequency: 6 days a week. 22140 Solapur–Mumbai CST Express – except Wednesday, 22139 Mumbai CST–Solapur Express – except Thursday.
- Train number: 22139 / 22140

On-board services
- Classes: AC First Class, AC 2 tier, AC 3 tier, Sleeper Class, General Unreserved
- Seating arrangements: Yes
- Sleeping arrangements: Yes
- Catering facilities: No pantry car attached

Technical
- Rolling stock: Standard Indian Railways coaches
- Track gauge: 1,676 mm (5 ft 6 in)
- Operating speed: 110 km/h (68 mph) maximum 46.27 km/h (29 mph) including halts

The 22140 / 39 Solapur–Mumbai CST Express is an Express train belonging to Indian Railways – Central Railway zone that runs between Solapur Junction and Mumbai CST in India.

It operates as train number 22140 from Solapur Junction to Mumbai CST and as train number 22139 in the reverse direction serving the state of Maharashtra.

== Coaches ==
The 22140 / 39 Solapur–Mumbai CST Express has 1 AC First Class cum AC 2 tier, 2 AC 3 tier, 6 Sleeper Class, 4 General Unreserved and 2 SLR (Seating cum Luggage Rake) coaches. It does not carry a pantry car.

As is customary with most train services in India, coach composition may be amended at the discretion of Indian Railways depending on demand.

== Service ==
22140 Solapur–Mumbai CST Express covers the distance of 455 kilometres (283 mi) in 10 hours 50 mins (42.00 km/h) and in 8 hours 50 mins as 22139 Mumbai CST–Solapur Express (51.51 km/h).

== Routeing ==
The 22140 / 39 Solapur–Mumbai CST Express runs from Solapur Junction via Pune Junction, Karjat, Kalyan Junction to Mumbai CST.

== Traction ==
This train is hauled end to end by a Kalyan-based WAP7 in its entire journey.

== Timings ==
22140 Solapur–Mumbai CST Express leaves Solapur Junction every day except Wednesday at 21:10 hrs IST and reaches Mumbai CST at 05:10 hrs IST the next day.

22139 Mumbai CST–Solapur Express leaves Mumbai CST every day except Thursday at 21:20 hrs IST and reaches Solapur Junction at 05:30 hrs IST the next day.

== See also ==
- Siddheshwar Express
