= Pandharpur railway station =

Railway Station in Maharashtra, India

Coordinates: 17.6692°N 75.3196°E

Pandharpur
- Pandharpur Railway Station

General information
- Location: Pandharpur, Maharashtra; India
- System: Indian Railways
- Owner: Indian Railways
- Operator: Central Railway
- Line: Miraj – Latur Road
- Platforms: 3
- Tracks: 2

Construction
- Structure type: At ground
- Parking: Available
- Accessible: Disabled access

Other information
- Station code: PVR
- Division(s): Solapur

History
- Opened: 1886; 140 years ago
- Electrified: Yes (2019-20)

Passengers
- 7000 Daily
Location
- Location within India Location within Maharashtra

Pandharpur railway station is a railway station serving Pandharpur town, in Solapur district of Maharashtra State of India. It is under Solapur railway division of Central Railway Zone of IndiaRailway.

It is located at 469 m above sea level and has three platforms. As of 2016, a single broad gauge railway line serves at this station. Eight trains stop in addition to four originating trains and four terminating trains. Solapur Airport Maharashtra.

There is demand from passengers to start Mumbai CSMT - Miraj express via Pandharpur on daily basis so that it can connect people of Pandharpur, sangola & Jath with capital city Mumbai and medical city Miraj of Western Maharashtra.

== Gallery ==
Front view of the Station Building

Panoramic view of the station building

View from platform

Locomotive exhibited outside the station

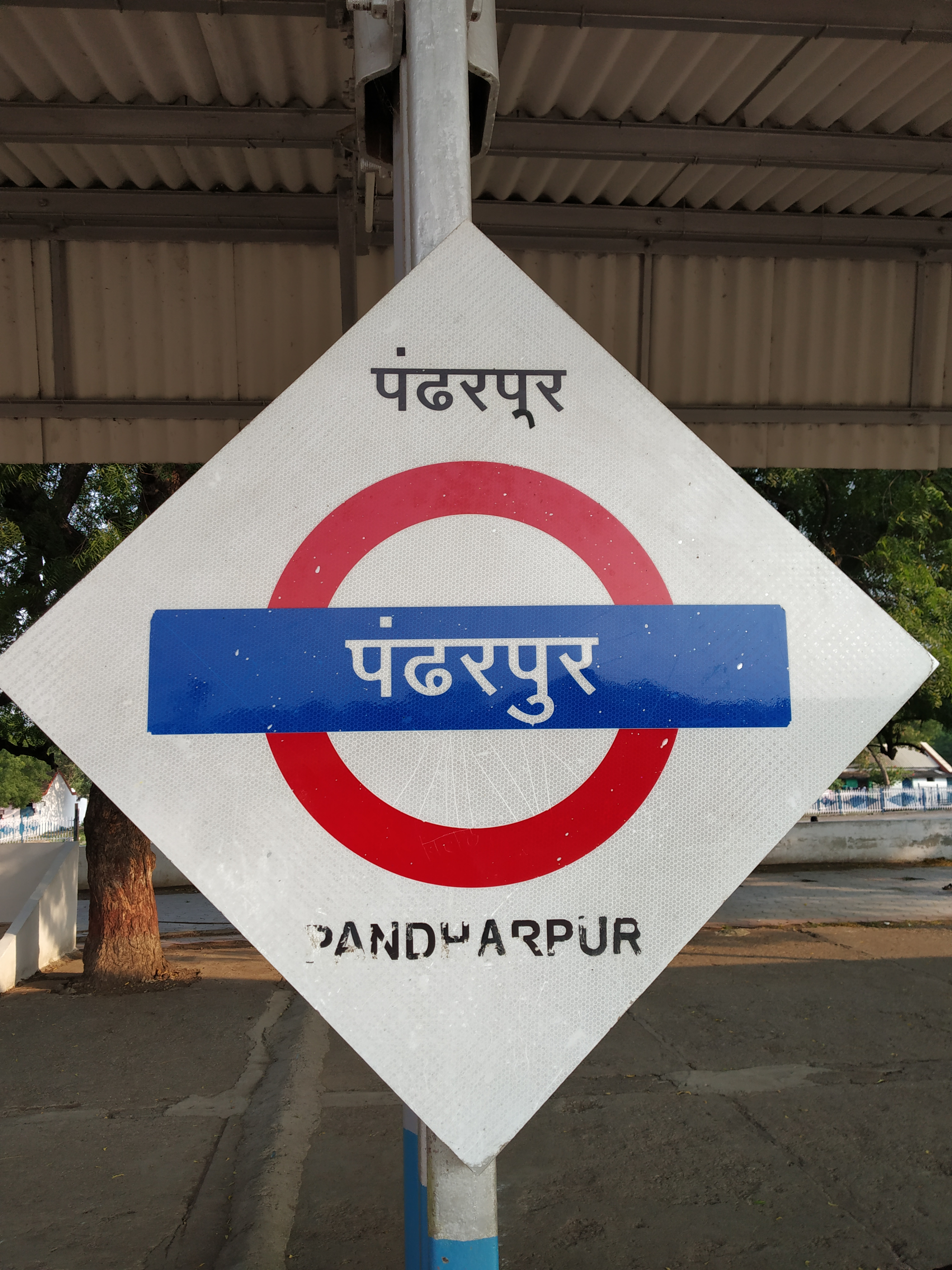
Pandharpur station board
