= Udyan Express =

Train in India

Overview
- Service type: Express
- Locale: Maharashtra, Karnataka & Andhra Pradesh
- First service: 1 July 1984; 41 years ago
- Current operator: Central Railway

Route
- Termini: Mumbai CSMT (CSMT); KSR Bengaluru (SBC)
- Stops: 34
- Distance travelled: 1,153 km (716 mi)
- Average journey time: 24 hours 50 minutes
- Service frequency: Daily
- Train number: 11301 / 11302

On-board services
- Classes: AC First Class, AC 2 Tier, AC 3 Tier, Ac 3 Tier Economy, Sleeper Class, General Unreserved
- Seating arrangements: Yes
- Sleeping arrangements: Yes
- Catering facilities: On-board catering E-catering
- Observation facilities: Rake sharing with 12115/12116 Siddheshwar Express.
- Baggage facilities: Available
- Other facilities: Below the seats

Technical
- Rolling stock: LHB coach
- Track gauge: 1,676 mm (5 ft 6 in)
- Operating speed: 130 km/h (81 mph) maximum, 52 km/h (32 mph) average including halts.
Route map
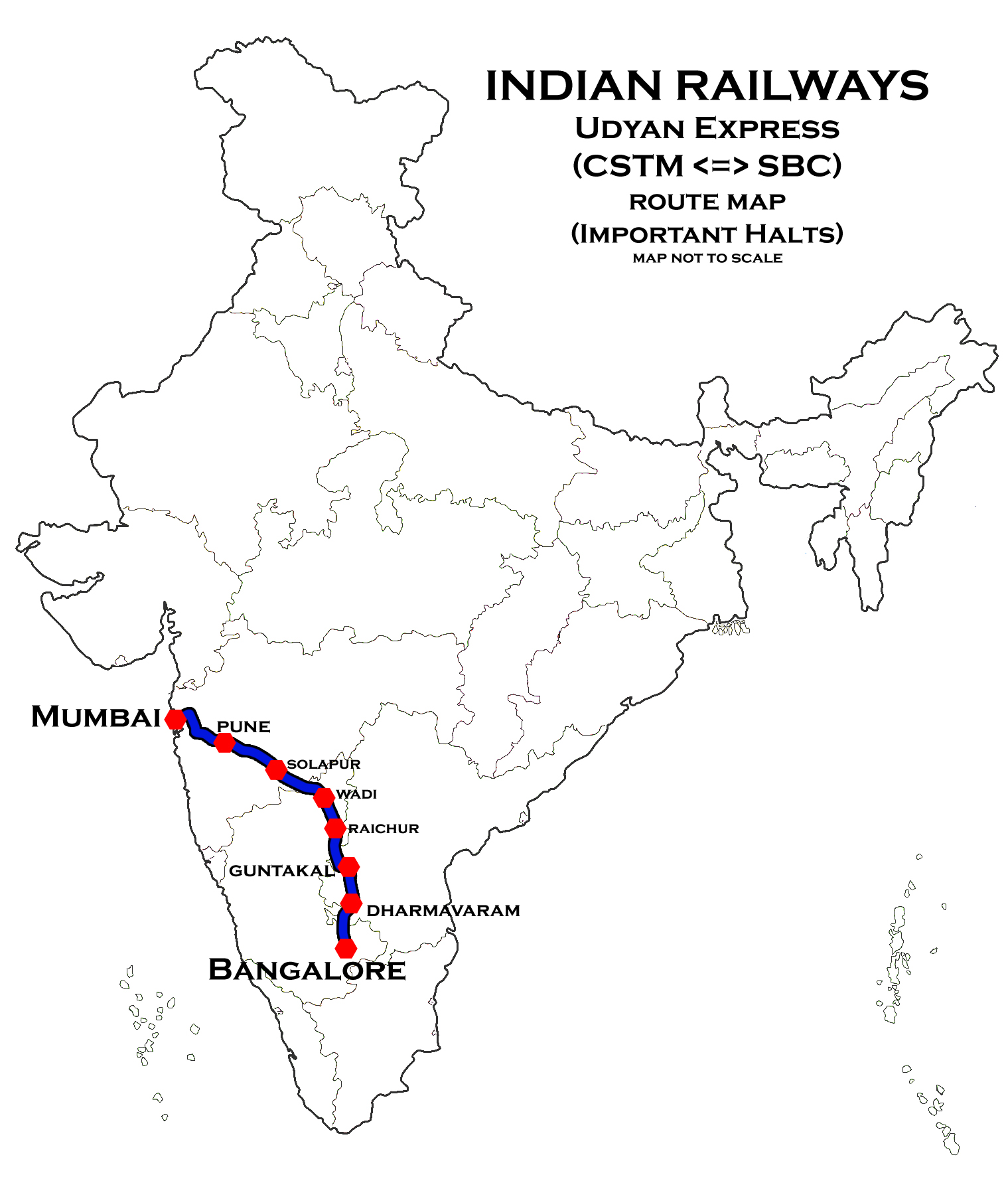

The 11301 / 11302 Udyan Express is an express train belonging to Indian Railways that runs between Mumbai Chhatrapati Shivaji Maharaj Terminus and Bangalore in India. It operates as train number 11301 from Mumbai Chhatrapati Shivaji Maharaj Terminus to Krantivira Sangolli Rayanna railway station (Bengaluru City) and as train number 11302 in the reverse direction serving the states of Maharashtra, Karnataka & Andhra Pradesh.

It is named as the Udyan Express since Bangalore is known as the Garden City of India dotted with many Public Gardens and parks such as Lalbagh Botanical Garden, Cubbon Park, etc. and various other parks almost 1 park between every 4 roads and other large parks in every locality maintained by the BBMP and also there are private gardens. The word "Udyan" means a garden in Sanskrit, Hindi and Marathi and Kannada. The train was previously numbered as 16529/30 Udyan Express and was renumbered to 11301/11302 when the timetable for July 2013 came into effect. This train now shares its rake with the Siddheshwar Express & operational control is now with Central Railway.

This train was started in the year 1983, when the Guntakal–Bangalore (GTL–SBC) route underwent gauge conversion from metre gauge to broad gauge. Prior to this, people that desired a Mumbai–Bangalore train journey had to change trains at Guntakal and travel via Dharmavaram to Bangalore on metre gauge express trains. The train takes 19 hours to complete its journey from Mumbai-Bengaluru/Bengaluru-Mumbai. It is one of the most preferred trains that run on this route

When this train was started, it had the numbers 129 and 130 for the Bombay VT to Bangalore City down route, and the reverse (up) route respectively. When the railways handed out 4 digit train numbers in the early 1990s, the train got the number 6529 and 6530.

== Coaches ==
The 11301/11302 Udyan Express presently has 1 AC 1st Class, 3 AC 2 tier, 3 AC 3 tier, 3 AC 3 tier Econony, 8 Sleeper Class, & 3 General Unreserved coaches.

As with most train services in India, coach composition may be amended at the discretion of Indian Railways depending on demand.

Earlier the train had ICF coaches. From 24 November 2019, 11301 Udyan Express received LHB coaches starting from Mumbai.

== Service ==
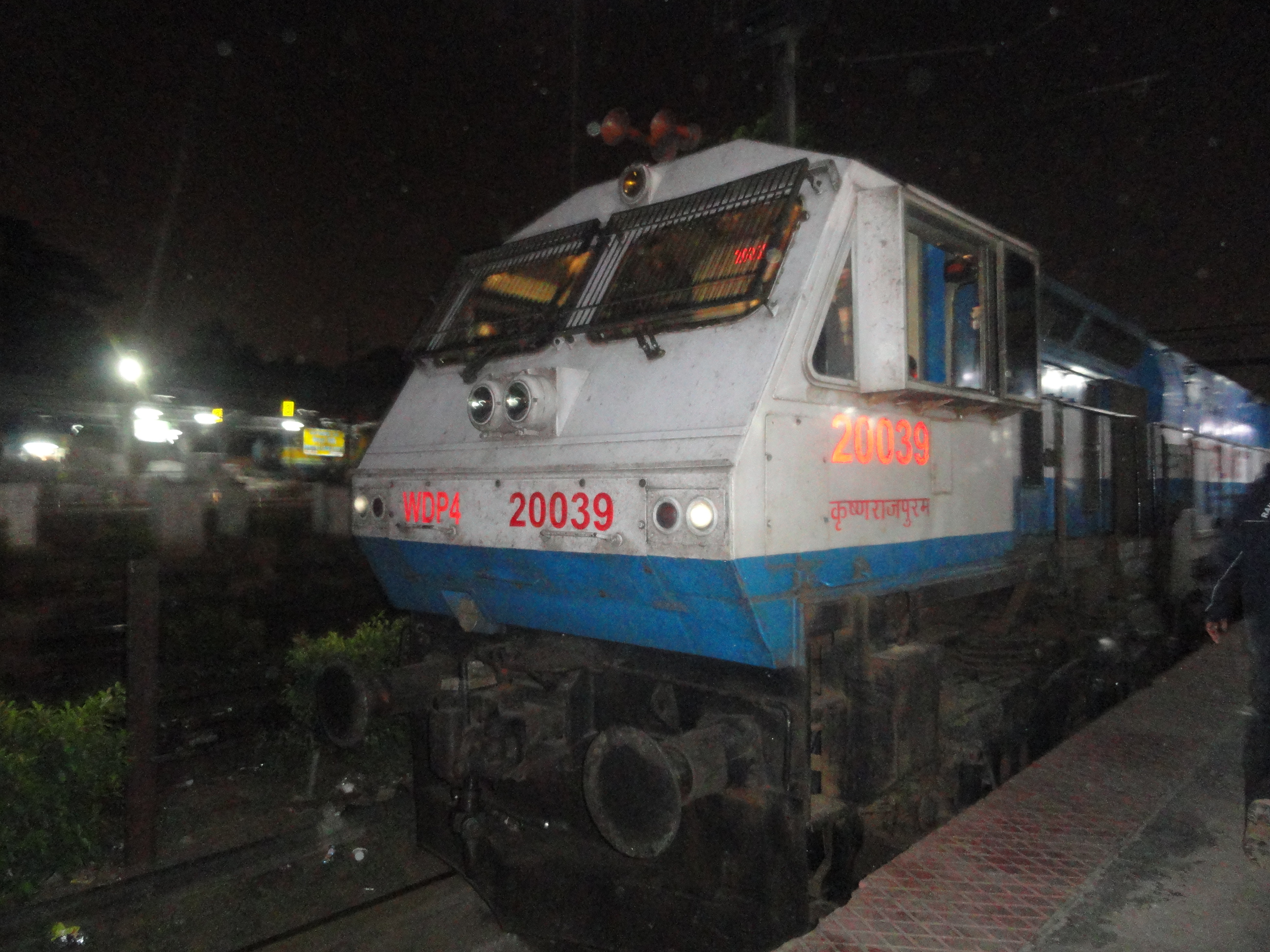
WDP4 Engine also used to Haul this train.

The 11301 Udyan Express covers the distance of 1153 kilometres in 21 hours 50 mins and in 23 hours 35 minutes as 11302 Udyan Express.

As the average speed of the train is below 52 km/h, its fare does not include a Superfast surcharge.

Once the train leaves Maharashtra & crosses into Karnataka, crosses into Andhra Pradesh and re-enters Karnataka again after crossing Hindupur.

The Udyan Express covers the scenic Sahyadri mountain ranges between Karjat and Lonavala, which are also known as the Bhor Ghat during the day in both directions.

It also passes through the Makalidurga Ghats near Bengaluru, which is marked by sharp curves.

== Traction ==
Earlier the train used to have diesel traction like WDP-4 and WDG-3A. As the route is now fully electrified, it is hauled end to end by a Kalyan Loco Shed-based WAP-7 electric locomotive in both directions.

== Time table ==
Station Code	Station name	Arrival	Departure
CSMT	Chhatrapati Shivaji Maharaj Terminus	---	08:10
DR	Dadar Central	08:22	08:25
KYN	Kalyan Junction	09:02	09:05
KJT	Karjat Junction	09:47	09:50
LNL	Lonavala	10:33	10:35
PUNE	Pune Junction	11:40	11:45
URI	Uruli	12:13	12:15
DD	Daund Junction	12:55	13:00
KWV	Kurduwadi Junction	14:23	14:25
SUR	Solapur	15:35	15:40
AKOR	Akalkot Road	16:11	16:13
DUD	Dudhani	16:35	16:37
GUR	Ganagapur Road	16:58	17:00
KLBG	Kalaburagi Junction	17:30	17:35
SDB	Shahabad	17:58	18:00
WADI	Wadi Junction	18:30	18:35
NW	Nalwar	18:49	18:50
YG	Yadgir	19:09	19:10
SADP	Saidapur	19:29	19:30
KSN	Krishna	19:49	19:50
RC	Raichur Junction	20:13	20:15
MALM	Mantralayam Road	20:44	20:45
AD	Adoni	21:19	21:20
GTL	Guntakal Junction	22:30	22:35
ATP	Anantapur	23:48	23:50
DMM	Dharmavaram Junction	00:43	00:45
SSPN	Sri Sathya Sai Prashanti Nilayam	01:15	01:17
PKD	Penukonda Junction	01:34	01:35
HUP	Hindupur	02:38	02:40
GBD	Gauribidanur	03:28	03:30
DBU	Dodballapur	04:04	04:05
YNK	Yelahanka Junction	04:44	04:45
BNCE	Bengaluru East	05:17	05:18
BNC	Bengaluru Cantt	05:23	05:25
SBC	KSR Bengaluru City Junction	06:00	---
