= Siddheshwar Express =

The Siddeshwar Express is an overnight daily superfast train connecting Solapur to Mumbai via Pune in Maharashtra, India. As per the numbering of the Indian Railways, the train numbers are 12116 in the up direction (Solapur to Mumbai) and 12115 in the down direction (Mumbai to Solapur). It was started in 1985.

It now shares its rake with the Udyan Express.

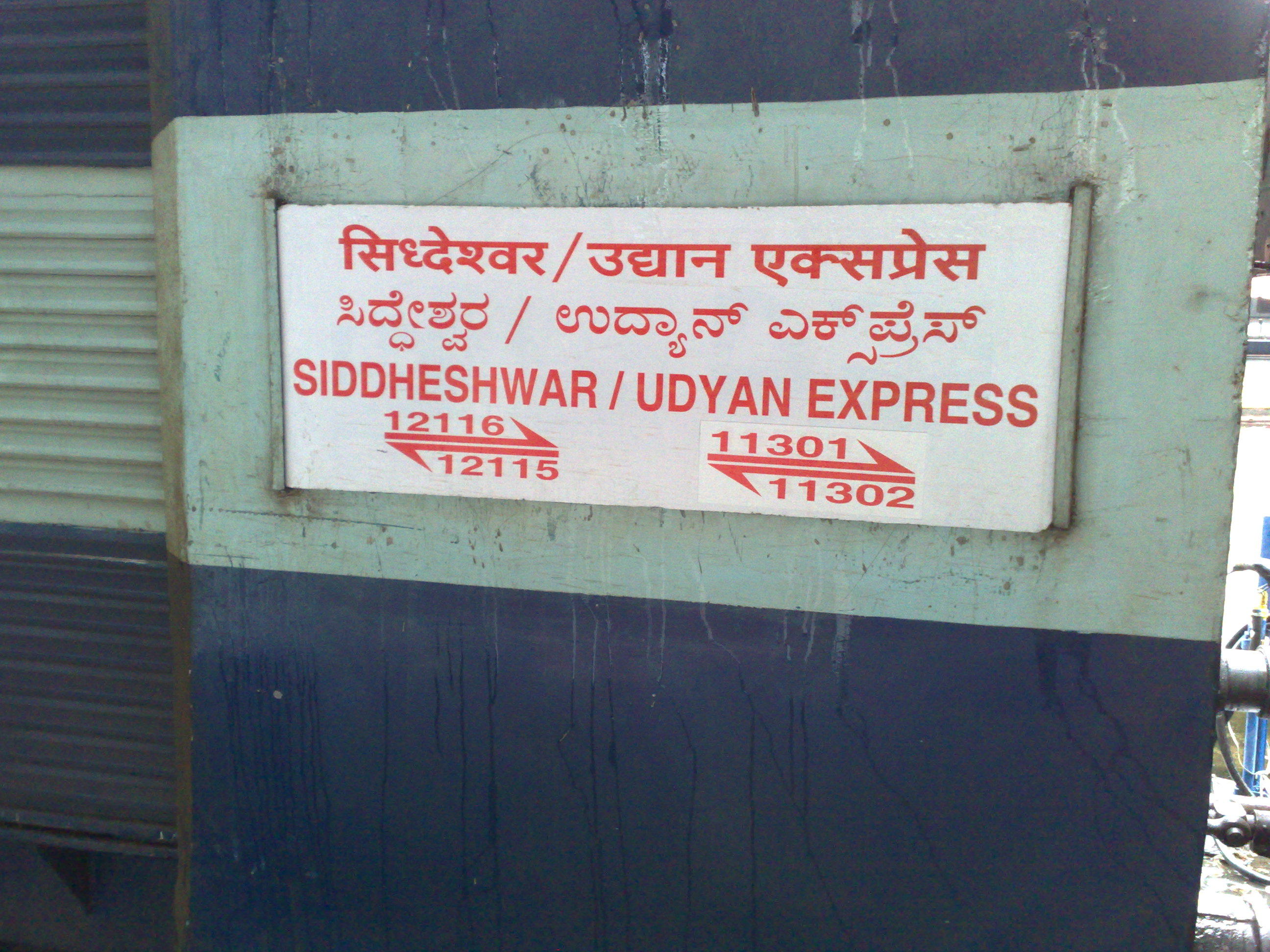
12115 Siddeshwar Express trainboard

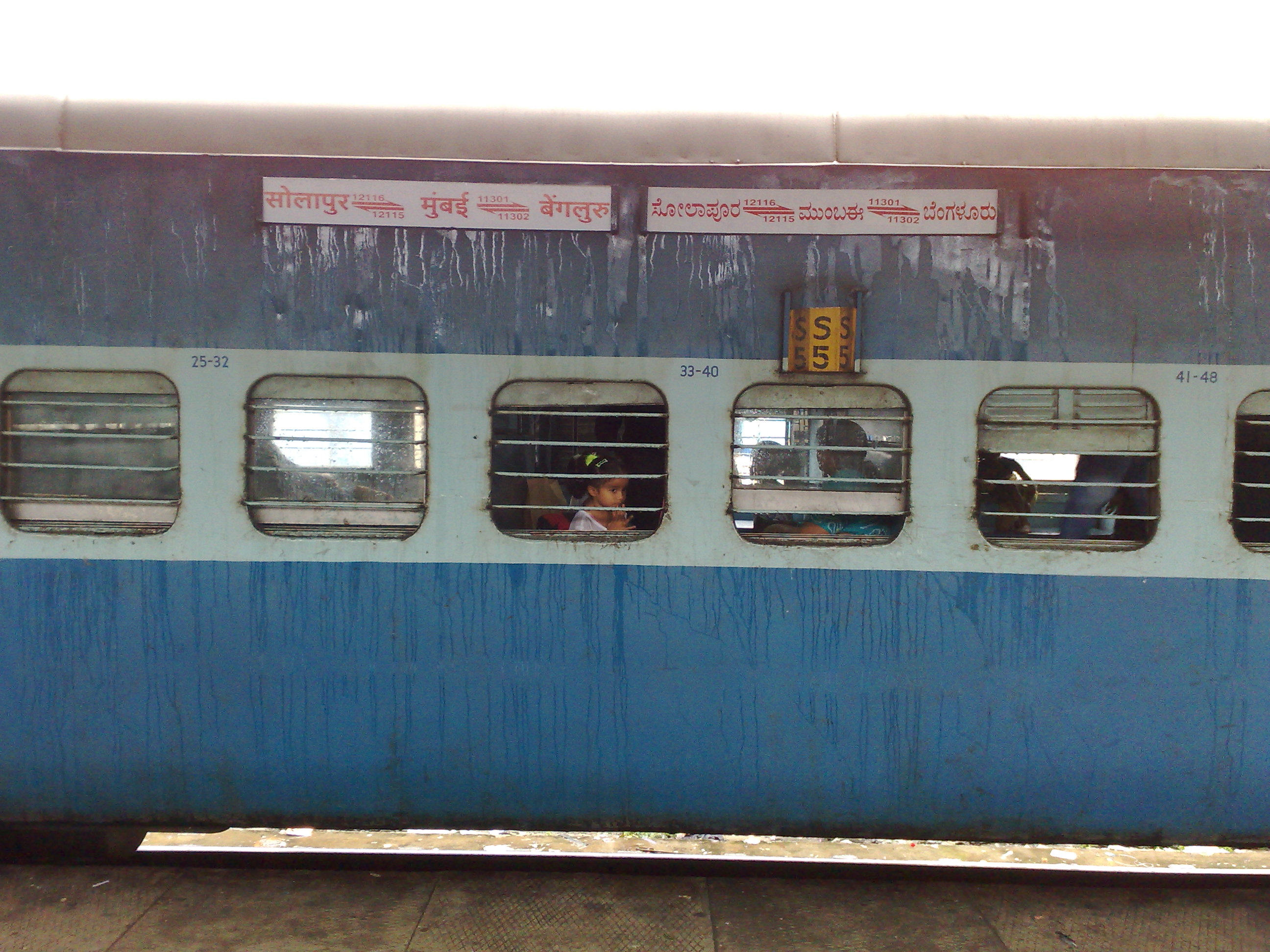
12115 Siddeshwar Express Sleeper coach

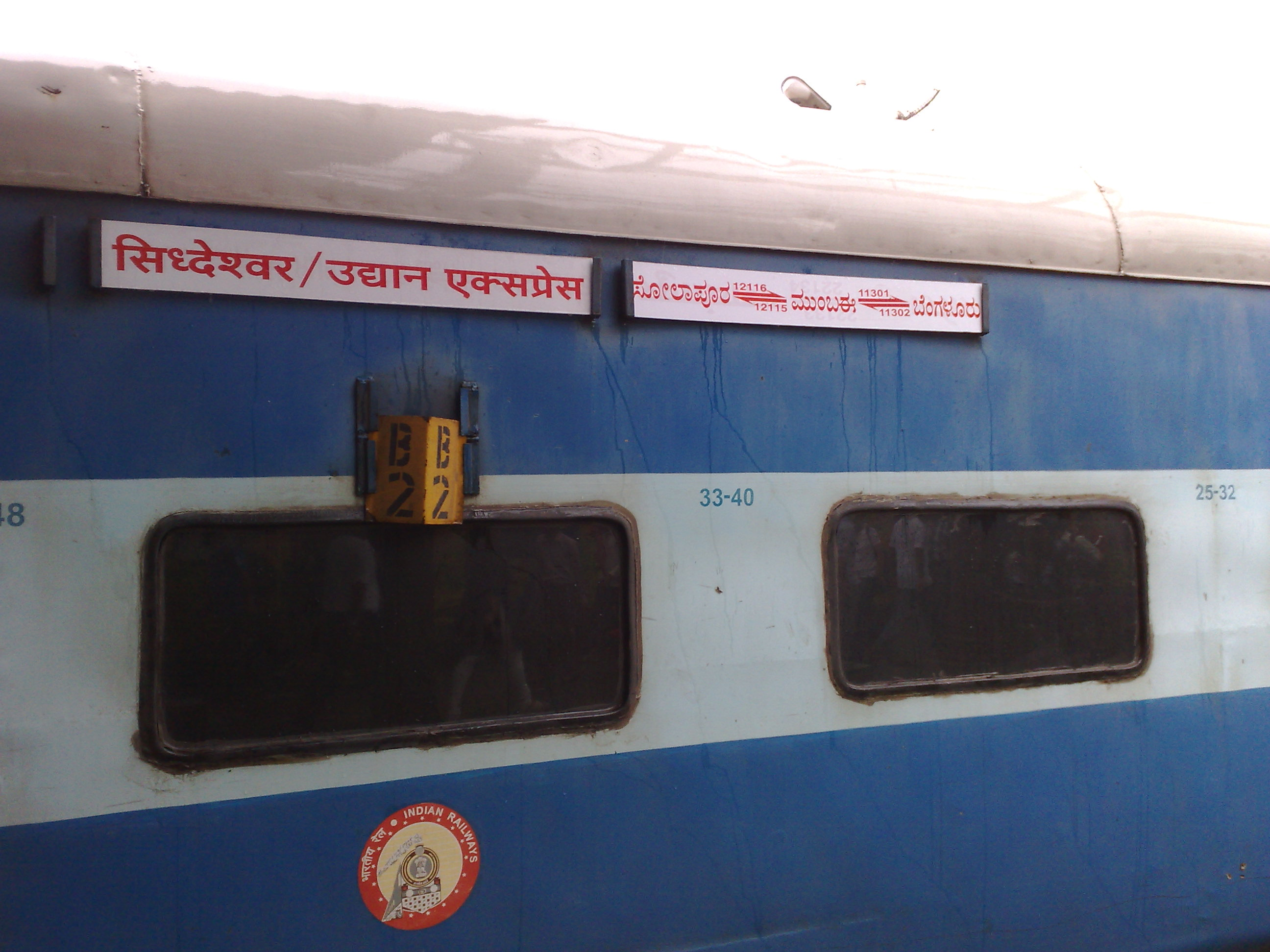
12115 Siddeshwar Express AC coach

== Route ==
Major halts on the way are Dadar, Thane, Kalyan, Lonavala, Pune, Daund & Solapur.

== Train halts list ==
Source: India Rail Info

The following is the timetable for 12115 Siddheshwar Express. For 12116 Siddheshwar Express, the timetable is just the reverse of the same.

Station name	Station code	Location
Mumbai CST	CSTM	Mumbai, Maharashtra
Dadar	DR	Mumbai, Maharashtra
Thane	TNA	Thane, Maharashtra
Kalyan Junction	KYN	Kalyan, Maharashtra
Karjat	KJT	Karjat, Maharashtra
Khandala	KAD	Khandala, Maharashtra
Lonavala	LNL	Lonavala, Maharashtra
Pune Junction	PUNE	Pune, Maharashtra
Daund Junction	DD	Daund, Maharashtra
Bhigwan	BGVN	Bhigwan, Maharashtra
Jeur	JEUR	Jeur, Maharashtra
Kurduvadi	KWV	Kurduvadi, Maharashtra
Mohol	MO	Mohol, Maharashtra
Solapur	SUR	Solapur, Maharashtra

== Traction ==
Earlier was WDP-4B. As the entire route is fully electrified between Mumbai CSMT and Solapur, this train is hauled end to end by a KYN based WAP 7, Ajni based WAP 7, Bhusawal based WAP-4, KYN based WCAM-3

== See also ==
- Solapur Mumbai CST Express
