= Solapur railway station =

Railway station in Maharashtra, India

Solapur Railway Station
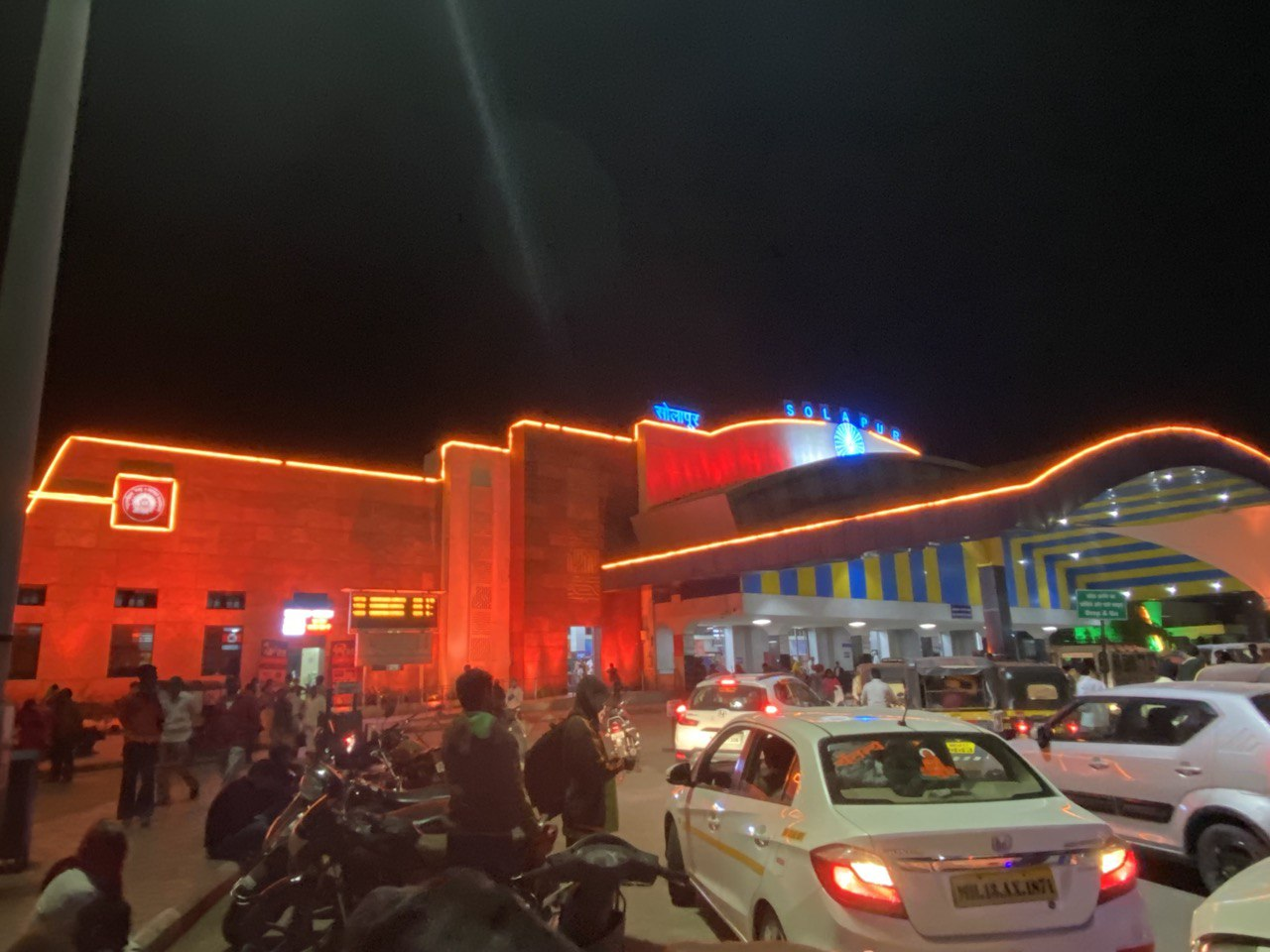
- Station entrance

General information
- Location: Station Road, Solapur, Maharashtra; India
- Coordinates: 17°39′50″N 75°53′35″E
- Elevation: 455.000 metres (1,492.782 ft)
- System: Indian Railways station
- Owner: Indian Railways
- Operator: Central Railway
- Lines: Mumbai–Chennai line Dadar–Solapur section Solapur–Guntakal section Solapur–Miraj Express
- Platforms: 5
- Tracks: 7
- Connections: CPM/GSU SUR - Shailendra Singh Parihar

Construction
- Structure type: Standard on ground
- Parking: Yes
- Cycle facilities: No

Other information
- Status: Functioning
- Station code: SUR
- Division(s): Solapur

History
- Opened: 1860

Passengers
- Daily: 120,000+
Location
- Location within Maharashtra Location within India
- Interactive map

Solapur railway station is located in Solapur district in the Indian state of Maharashtra category NSG-2 and serves Solapur city and the industrial belt around it. It is headquarters of Solapur Railway Division and a part of Central Railway zone.

Solapur lies on the planned Mumbai–Hyderabad high-speed rail corridor. The possibility of an Ahmednagar Karmala railway line is also being explored.

== History ==
The first passenger train in India from Chhatrapati Shivaji Maharaj Terminus in Mumbai to Thane ran on 16 April 1853 on the track laid by the Great Indian Peninsula Railway. The GIPR line was extended to Kalyan Junction in 1854 and then on the south-east side to Khopoli via Palasdhari at the foot of the Western Ghats in 1856. While construction work was in progress across the Bhor Ghat, GIPR opened to public the Khandala–Pune track in 1858. The Bhor Ghat incline connecting Palasdari to Khandala was completed in 1862, thereby connecting Mumbai and Pune.

The Pune–Raichur sector of the Mumbai–Chennai line was opened in stages: the portion from Pune to Barshi Road was opened in 1859, from Barshi Road to Mohol in 1860 and from Mohol to Solapur also in 1860. Work on the line from Solapur southwards was begun in 1865 and the line was extended to Raichur in 1871.

The metre-gauge Solapur–Hubli line was opened in stages. The Gadag–Hotgi section was opened in 1884. The lines were converted to broad gauge by 2008.

It is the 19th cleanest station in India (as of 2019) and one of the most beautiful railway stations in India ranked A-1 among 500 main stations in India.

== Major trains ==
The train which originates from Solapur are :

- Solapur–Hassan Express (11311/11312)
- Siddheshwar Express (12115/12116)
- Hutatma Express (12157/12158)
- Pune–Solapur Intercity Express (12169/12170)
- Mumbai CSMT–Solapur Vande Bharat Express (22225/22226)

== Electrification ==
Railway electrification in India began with the first electric train, between Bombay Victoria Terminus and Kurla by the Great Indian Peninsula Railway's (GIPR) on 3 February 1925, on 1.5 kV DC. The Kalyan–Pune section was electrified with 1.5 kV DC overhead system in 1930. These sections were converted from 1.5 kV DC to 25kV AC by 2015.

The Pune–Daund section as well as Daund–Bhigwan section was electrified in 2017. The electrification of the Bhigwan-Kalaburgi section is in progress with completion expected by March 2021.

Rail Vikas Nigam Limited team achieved another milestone of execution of RE of Hotgi-Solapur double line section RKM 14.96 & TKM 44.71. The Solapur-Kalaburgi Double line section is now totally electrified.

The inspection of railway electrification work between Hotgi-Solapur double line section (RKM 14.96 & TKM 44.71) was successfully completed. With the commissioning of this section, now 610 RKM railway electrification work is completed out of 641 RKM of the PUNE-WADI-GUNTAKAL section electrification project.

The project covers an important route of the Golden Quadrilateral connecting Mumbai and Chennai City. In addition, all south-going electric passenger and goods trains from major cities like Hyderabad, Chennai and Bangalore (Southcentral Railway and Southwest Railway) can come up to Solapur district, Maharashtra (Central Railway) on electric traction.

== Passenger movement ==
Solapur railway station is amongst the top hundred booking stations of Indian Railway. It serves about 120,000 passengers every day.

== Gallery ==
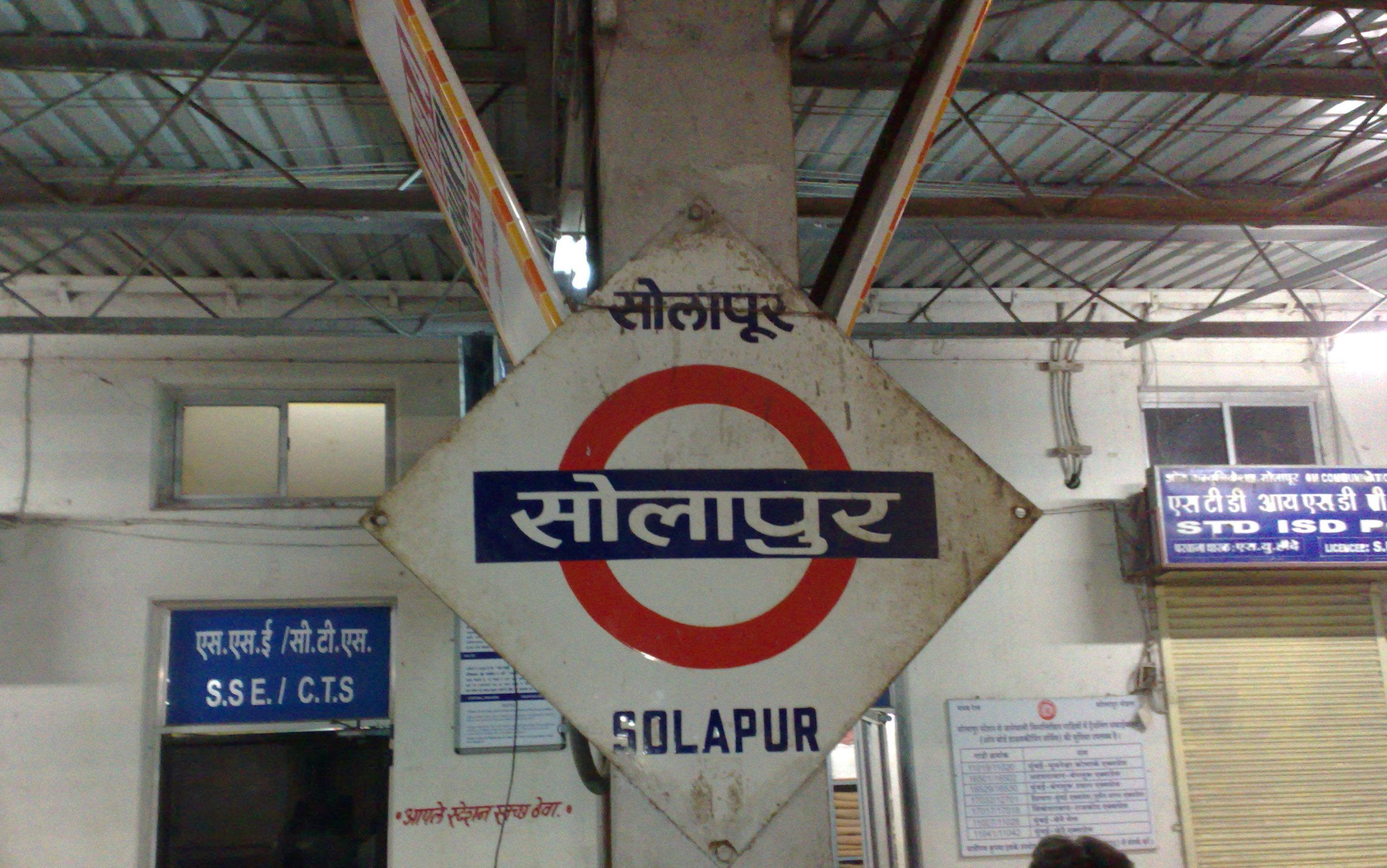
Solapur Railway Station Platformboard

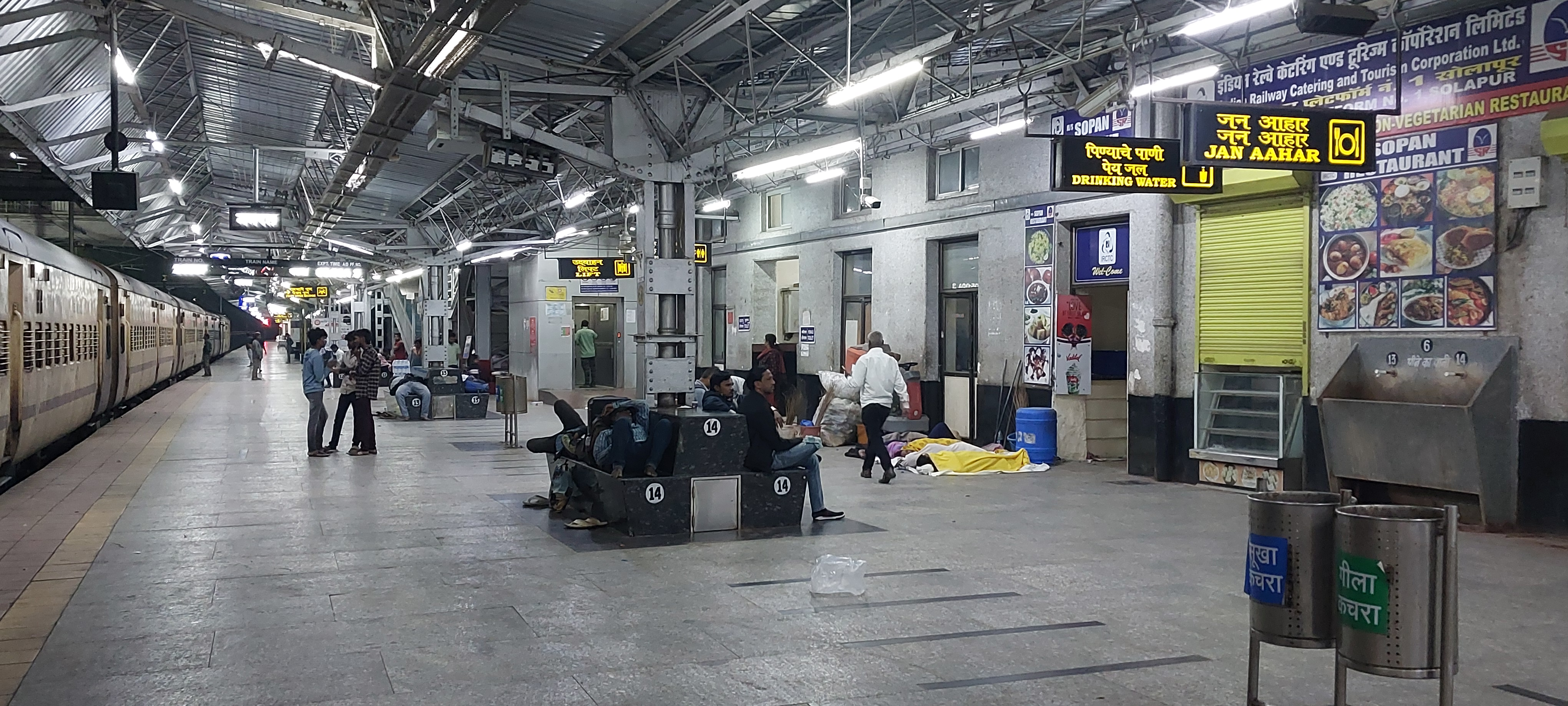
Inside Solapur Railway Station

Preceding station	Indian Railways	Following station
Bale towards ?	Central Railway zone Mumbai–Chennai line	Tikekarwadi towards ?
Terminus	Central Railway zone Solapur–Gadag line	Tikekarwadi towards ?
