= Tikekarwadi railway station =

Railway station in India

General information
- Location: Internal Colony Rd, Solapur; India
- Coordinates: 17.6153°N 75.9337°E
- System: Regular
- Owner: Government of India
- Operator: Indian Railways
- Platforms: 2

Other information
- Fare zone: Central

Services
Passenger travelling
Location

Tikekarwadi Railway Station is an Indian Railway station owned by Government of India. It is located in the Indian state of Maharashtra's Solapur District. Tikekarwadi Railway Station is a part of Solapur Railway Division and is Nearset Railway Station to Solapur Railway Station (around 5–6 km). Various Development Projects of Indian Railways and Solapur Railway Division has started on ground Level of Tikekarwadi Railway Station to stabilize to crowd on Solapur Railway Station. Works such as pit lines, platform increments, electrification, railway track four laning, maintaining and hauling for engines and trains, etc has to be done in upcoming years. It is one of the Railway stations in the central India railways zone. The train station has a capacity of halting 14 trains and have 2 platforms.
