= Adoni railway station =

Railway station in Andhra Pradesh, India

Adoni
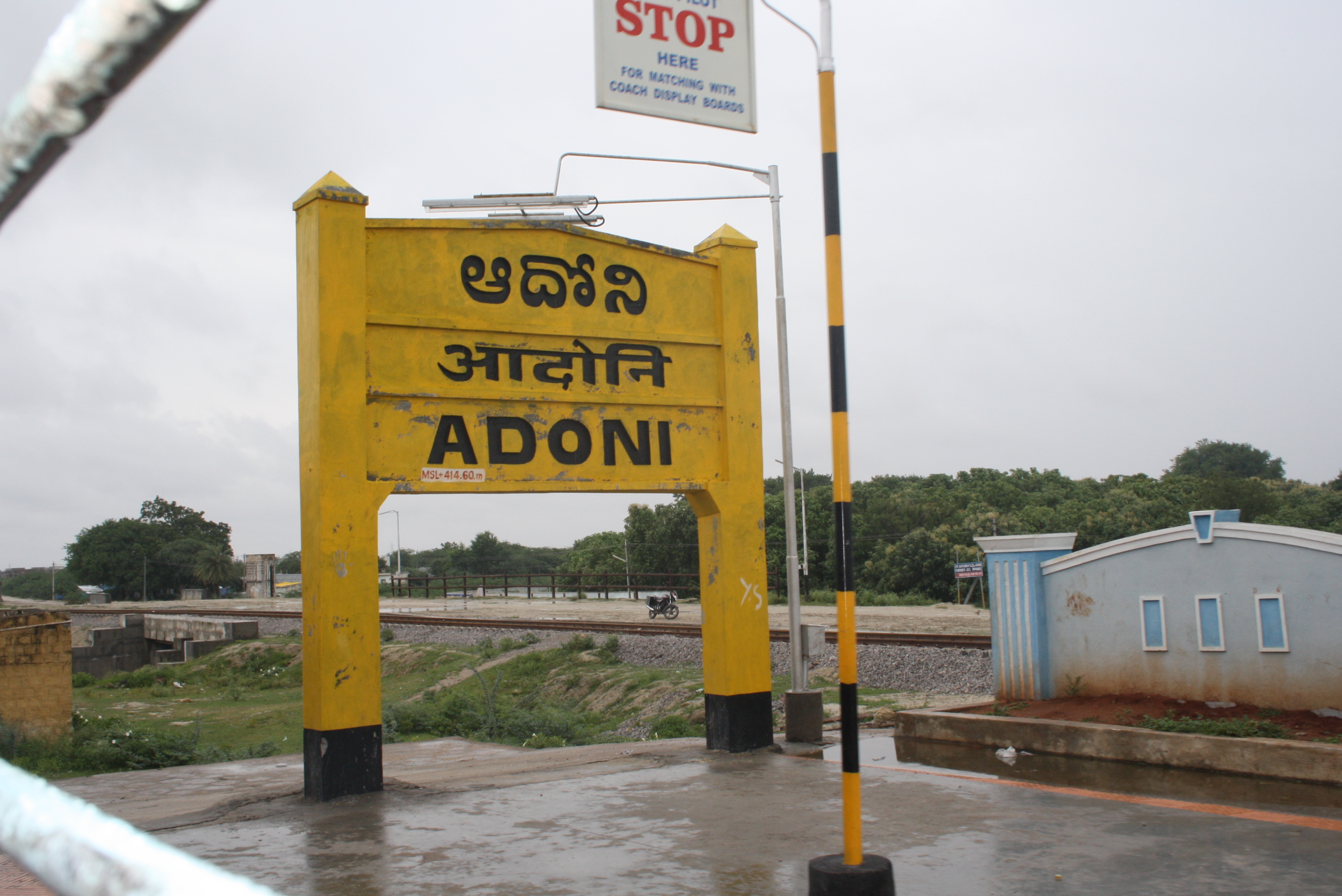
- Adoni Railway Station platform sign

General information
- Location: HBG Nagar, Adoni, Kurnool district, Andhra Pradesh; India
- Coordinates: 15°37′03″N 77°16′29″E
- Elevation: 435 metres (1,427 ft)
- System: Indian Railway
- Owner: Indian Railways
- Operator: South Coast Railway zone
- Line: Solapur–Guntakal section of Mumbai–Chennai line
- Platforms: 4
- Tracks: 5

Construction
- Structure type: Standard (On ground)
- Parking: Yes
- Cycle facilities: No

Other information
- Status: Functioning
- Station code: AD
- Zone(s): South Coast Railway
- Division(s): Guntakal

History
- Opened: 1871(148 Years ago)

Services
| Preceding station | Indian Railways | Following station |
|---|---|---|
| Nagarur towards ? | South Coast Railway zone Solapur–Guntakal section | Isvi towards ? |
Location
- Location within India Location within Andhra Pradesh

Adoni railway station (station code:AD) is located in Kurnool district in the Indian state of Andhra Pradesh and serves the city of Adoni.

== Classification ==
Adoni is classified as a NSG4–category station in the Guntakal railway division.

== Electrification ==
Electrification work in the 641 km (398 mi) Pune–Wadi–Guntakal sector was initiated in 2013.
