= Kurduvadi =

Kurduvadi Gosavyachi wadi
- Town
- Location in Maharashtra, India
- Coordinates: +) 18.08°N 75.43°E
- Country: India
- State: Maharashtra state
- District: Solapur
- Established: Kurduwadi Nagarparishad Established in 1947
- Founder: British Raj

Government
  - Type: Municipal Council Category C
  - Body: Kurduwadi Municipal Council (Category C)

Area
  - Total: 18 km^{2} (6.9 sq mi)
- Elevation: 502 m (1,647 ft)

Population (2025)
  - Total: 50,000 +
  - Density: 2,800/km^{2} (7,200/sq mi)
- Demonym: kurduvadikar

Marathi, English
  - Official: Marathi
- Time zone: UTC+5:30 (IST)
- Postal code: 413208
- Vehicle registration: MH45 Akuj

Kurduvadi is a town in Solapur district in Maharashtra state of India. Kurduwadi junction is situated on Barshi Light Railway. It is known mainly for the railway junction connecting two different rail tracks. Prior to gauge conversion it used to be a junction with different size gauge tracks. Kurduwadi has central railway's Narrow gauge boggie workshop and goods wagon repair workshop which contributes to the local economy as well. Kurduwadi has MIDC, which has been expanding in past few years. It manufactures various products from goods, such as masala, agriculture equipments, steel sheets. The town contributes in the local economy as it provides everything that requires day to day basis to the nearby villages. Kurduvadi has sub-divisional magistrate's office and residence, sub-divisional agriculture office, sales tax office, Nagarparishad, Panchayat Samiti, railway police force station for the local administration. The city also has K N Bhise college, Mahatma Jyotiba Phule College which provides degrees in science and arts. The town hosts Shivjayanti, Ganpati, Bhimjayanti festival celebrations. The town has been surrounded with highways where food options are available for travellers who are traveling between Pune-Latur and Latur-Kolhapur highways.

== Geography ==
Kurduvadi is located at 18.08°N 75.43°E. It has an average elevation of 502 metres (1646 feet). The location serves a junction point between Chennai Mumbai Railway Line and Miraj Latur Railway line, also it connects Latur, Barshi, Osmanabad to Pandharpur, Miraj, Sangali, Tembhurni, Akluj, Indapur, Pune, Mumbai via Kurduvadi. Kurduvadi has bypass for highway travelers.

== Demographics ==
As of 2001 India census, Kurduvadi had a population of 22,773. Males constitute 52% of the population and females 48%. Kurduvadi has an average literacy rate of 74%, higher than the national average of 59.5%: male literacy is 80%, and female literacy is 67%. In Kurduvadi, 13% of the population was under 6 years of age. 2021 census isn't available but as of 2025 the city's total population might be over 50,000.

== Transport ==
25 km off Mumbai Solapur Highway, Kurduwadi is accessible from Tembhurni on Mumbai Solapur Highway. Kurduwadi is known mainly for the narrow gauge railway workshop and railway junction, Kurduvadi railway station, on Central Railway of Indian Railways. A branch railway line takes off from Kuruvadi connecting Osmanabad and Latur towards East and Pandharpur and Miraj towards South-West. The branch line called Barshi Light Railway was narrow gauge until 2008. Now it has been converted to broad gauge. The new broad gauge track made a detour to connect Osmanabad which was not connected by railway line. The converted broad gauge track from Latur to Osmanabad was commissioned in September 2007 and the converted broad gauge track from Osmanabad-Barshi to Kurduvadi was commissioned in October 2008.

Kurduvadi is a railway junction where one major railway track between Wadi and Daund and a branch line track between Latur Road and Miraj intersect. The track from Daund continues to Pune and Mumbai towards west and to Manmad towards north-northwest. The branch line from Latur towards east of Kurduvadi connects Miraj in south-southwest and was called Barshi Light Railway as it was a narrow gauge track. Solapur lies southeast of Kurduvadi and connects to Bijapur. A part of the narrow gauge Barshi Light Railway track from Kurduvadi to Pandharpur (52 km) was converted to broad gauge in 2001. The narrow-gauge track from Pandharpur to Miraj was converted to broad gauge in 2010. The converted broad gauge track was commissioned in the last quarter of 2010 for freight trains and February 2011 for passenger trains. Now trains run on the broad gauge track from Miraj to Kurduvadi. These include trains from Miraj to Parbhani and from Kolhapur to Solapur via Miraj. The converted Miraj-Kurduvadi railway line has shortened the railway distance between Kolhapur, Solapur and Parbhani.
