= SMVT Bengaluru–Murdeshwar Express =

Train in India

SMVT Bengaluru-Murdeshwar Express

Overview
- Service type: Express
- First service: 16 September 2023; 2 years ago
- Current operator: South Western Railway

Route
- Termini: SMVT Bengaluru (SMVB); Murdeshwar (MRDW)
- Stops: 25
- Distance travelled: 447 km (278 mi)
- Average journey time: 11 hours 30 minutes
- Service frequency: Daily
- Train number: 16585 / 16586

On-board services
- Class(es): AC First Class, AC 2 Tier, AC 3 Tier, Sleeper Class, General Unreserved
- Seating arrangements: Yes
- Sleeping arrangements: Yes
- Catering facilities: No pantry car attached
- Observation facilities: Large windows
- Baggage facilities: No
- Other facilities: Below the seats

Technical
- Rolling stock: LHB coach
- Track gauge: 1,676 mm (5 ft 6 in)
- Operating speed: 49 km/h (30 mph) average including halts.

The 16585 / 16586 SMVT Bengaluru–Murdeshwar Express is an express train belonging to South Western Railway Zone of Indian Railways that run between Sir M. Visvesvaraya Terminal, Bengaluru and Murdeshwar in India. It's a daily base train connecting with number of 16585/16586.

== Background ==
This train was inaugurated on 21 February 2019, Flagged off by Nalin Kumar Kateel an MP of Dakshin Kannada for connectivity between the Mangalore to Bangalore. Later it was extended from Mangalore Central (MAQ) to Murdeshwar (MRDW) with growing demand by Udupi & Uttara Kannada residents.

== Service ==
The frequency of this train is daily, it covers the distance of 447 km with an average speed of 40.76 km/h.

== Routes and halts ==
This train passes through KSR Bengaluru City Junction, Mysuru Junction, Hassan Junction and Sakleshpur, Mangalore on both sides.

1. SMVT Bengaluru
2. Bengaluru Cantt
3. KSR Bengaluru City Junction
4. Kengeri
5. Ramanagaram
6. Channapatna
7. Mandya
8. Mysuru Junction
9. Krishnarajanagara
10. Hole Narsipur
11. Hassan Junction
12. Sakleshpur
13. Subrahmanya Road
14. Kabaka Puttur
15. Bantawala
16. Mangalore Junction
17. Mangalore Central
18. Surathkal
19. Mulki
20. Udupi
21. Barkur
22. Kundapura
23. Byndoor Mookambika Road
24. Bhatkal
25. Murdeshwar

== Traction ==
As the route is fully electrified, a Krishnarajapuram Loco Shed-based WAP-7 or Vijayawada Loco Shed / Erode Loco Shed-based WAP-4 electric locomotive pulls the train to its destination in both directions.
