= Panchaganga Express =

Train in India

Overview
- Service type: Express
- First service: 7 March 2020; 6 years ago
- Current operator: South Western Railway

Route
- Termini: KSR Bengaluru (SBC); Karwar (KAWR)
- Stops: 27
- Distance travelled: 673 km (418 mi)
- Average journey time: 13hrs 20mins
- Service frequency: Daily
- Train number: 16595 / 16596

On-board services
- Classes: AC First, AC 2 Tier, AC 3 Tier, AC 3 tier economy, Sleeper Class, General Unreserved
- Seating arrangements: Yes
- Sleeping arrangements: Yes
- Catering facilities: E-catering
- Observation facilities: Large windows
- Baggage facilities: No
- Other facilities: Below the seats

Technical
- Rolling stock: LHB coach
- Track gauge: 1,676 mm (5 ft 6 in)
- Operating speed: 49 km/h (30 mph) average including halts.

The 16595 / 16596 Panchaganga Express is an Express train belonging to South Western Railway zone that runs between KSR Bengaluru and Karwar in India via the Padil Bypass route (bypassing both Mangaluru stations). It is currently being operated with 16595/16596 train numbers on a daily basis. It is the fastest connecting train from Karwar to KSR Bengaluru

Train is named after Gangavali river near Gokarna and Ankola of Uttara Kannada and Panchagangavalli River of Udupi districts.

This train runs between KSR Bengaluru and Karwar as 16595/16596 Panchaganga Express. By bypassing both Mangaluru Junction and Mangaluru Central railway stations via the Padil bypass, it saves a minimum of 4 hours of travel time to commuters by avoiding the locomotive reversal at Mangaluru.

Few Passengers were asking railway board to operate this train as a single train by connecting Madgaon Junction with Bengaluru. By this Bengaluru people would get one more daily train to Madgaon. But the Railway Board outright rejected this demand and said this train is dedicated to people of Karnataka coastal and not beyond that. Although the people from Bengaluru can connect to Madgaon by this same train (Panchaganga Express) which rake shares with 10109/10110 Karwar - Madgaon Jn Express, but you should book another ticket from Karwar to Madgaon noting the train nos. (10109/10110). By this, there is no need to de-broad the train.

== Service ==
The 16595/KSR Bengaluru–Karwar Panchaganga Express covers 673 km in 14h 35m. The 16596/Karwar–KSR Bengaluru Express/Panchaganga Express covers 674 km in 15h 15m.

== Route and halts ==
The Halts of this train are:

- KSR Bengaluru
- Yesvantpur Junction
- Kunigal
- Channarayapatna
- Hassan Junction
- Sakleshpur
- Subrahmanya Road
- Kabaka Puttur
- Bantwala (BC Road)
- Surathkal
- Mulki
- Udupi
- Barkur
- Kundapura
- Mookambika Road Byndoor
- Bhatkal
- Murdeshwara
- Honnavara
- Kumta
- Gokarna Road
- Ankola
- Karwar

== Coach composition ==
The train has standard LHB rakes with a max speed of 130 km/h. The train consists of 19 coaches:

- 1 - AC I First class
- 1 - AC II Tier
- 1 - AC III Tier
- 2 - AC III tier economy
- 8 - Sleeper coaches
- 4 - General Unreserved
- 1 - Luggage Cum Disabled Coach
- 1 - Generator Coach

== Traction ==
As the entire route is under electrification , it is hauled by Krishnarajapuram Loco Shed based WDP-4D/WDP4 diesel locomotive on its entire journey.

== See also ==
- Bangalore City railway station
- Karwar railway station
- Yesvantpur–Karwar Express
- Madgaon railway station
