= Yesvantpur–Karwar Express =

Express train that runs between Yesvantpur Junction and Karwar in India

Yesvantpur–Karwar Express via Kunigal
Overview
- Service type: Express
- First service: 31 August 2009; 16 years ago
- Current operator: South Western Railway zone

Route
- Termini: Yesvantpur Junction (YPR); Karwar (KAWR)
- Stops: 32
- Distance travelled: 610 km (379 mi)
- Average journey time: 15h 30m
- Service frequency: Tri-Weekly
- Train number: 16515/16516

On-board services
- Classes: AC Chair Car, Second Sitting, General Unreserved, Vistadome
- Seating arrangements: Yes
- Sleeping arrangements: No
- Catering facilities: On-board catering E-catering
- Observation facilities: LHB coach
- Entertainment facilities: No
- Baggage facilities: No
- Other facilities: Below the seats

Technical
- Rolling stock: 2
- Track gauge: 1,676 mm (5 ft 6 in)
- Electrification: No
- Operating speed: 39 km/h (24 mph),

The Yesvantpur–Karwar Express is an Express train belonging to South Western Railway zone that runs between Yesvantpur Junction and Karwar in India. It is currently being operated with 16515/16516 train numbers on tri-weekly basis. It is a day train as on 6 January 2026.

== Service ==
The 16515/Yesvantpur–Karwar Express has an average speed of 39 km/h and covers 610 km in 15h 30m. The 16516/Karwar–Yesvantpur Express has an average speed of 41 km/h and covers 610 km in 15h.

== Route and halts ==
The important halts of the train are:

- Yesvantpur Junction
- Chikka Banavara
- Nelamangala
- Kunigal
- Hassan Junction
- Sakleshpur
- Subrahmanya Road
- Kabaka Puttur
- Bantwala
- Mangaluru Junction
- Suratkal
- Udupi
- Mookambika Road Byndoor
- Bhatkal
- Murdeshwar railway station
- Kumta
- Gokarna Road
- Ankola
- Karwar

== Coach composition ==
The train has standard LHB rakes with a max speed of 160 kmph. The train consists of 14 coaches:

- 1 AC Chair Car
- 7 Second Sitting
- 2 General Unreserved
- 2 EOG rake
- 2 Vistadome Coaches

== Traction ==
Both trains are hauled by a Krishnarajapuram Loco Shed-based WDP-4D locomotive between Karwar and Yesvantpur and vice versa.

== Direction reversal ==
The train reverses its direction 1 times:

- Mangaluru Junction

== Schedule ==
16515/16 – runs daily from both directions

Train number	Station code	Departure station	Departure time	Arrival station	Arrival time
16515	YPR	Yesvantpur Junction	7:00 AM	Karwar	10:30 PM (same day)
16516	KAWR	Karwar	5:30 AM	Yesvantpur Junction	8:30 PM (same day)

== See also ==
- Gomteshwara Express
- Karwar railway station
- Yesvantpur Junction railway station
- Yesvantpur–Vasco da Gama Express
