= Mumbai CSMT–Mangaluru Junction Superfast Express =

Express train in India

Mumbai CSMT – Mangaluru Junction Superfast Express (Rocket Express)
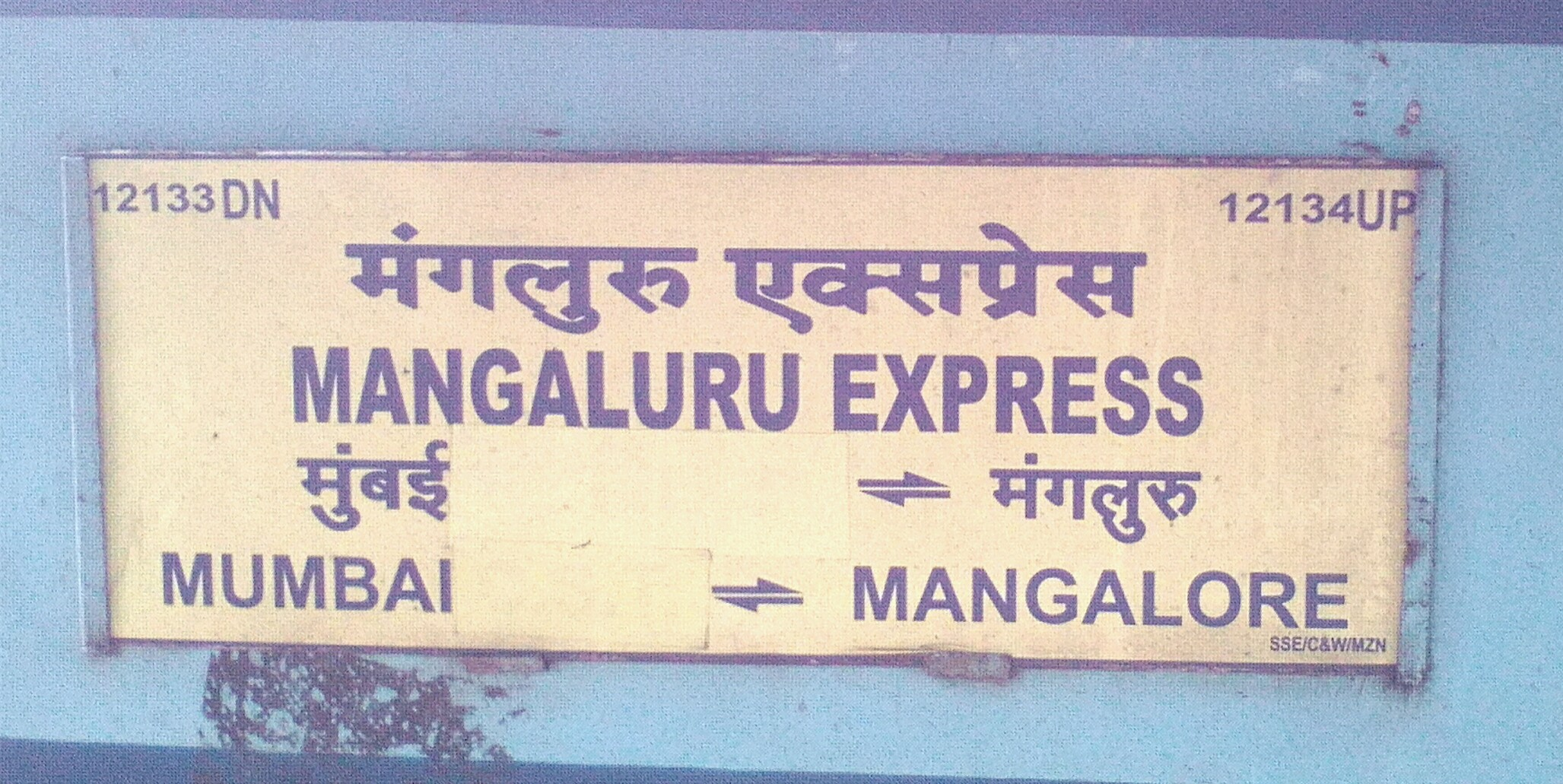
- Nameboard of Mumbai CSMT–Mangalore Jn. SF Express

Overview
- Service type: Superfast Express
- Status: Running
- Locale: Mangaluru
- First service: 23 November 2009; 16 years ago
- Current operator: Central Railway

Route
- Termini: Chhatrapati Shivaji Maharaj Terminus (CSMT); Mangaluru Junction (MAJN)
- Stops: 12
- Distance travelled: 1,124 km (698 mi)
- Average journey time: 14 hours 30 minutes
- Service frequency: Daily (Note: Runs daily for every direction.)
- Train number: 12133/12134

On-board services
- Classes: AC 2 tier, AC 3 tier, Sleeper class, General Unreserved
- Seating arrangements: No
- Sleeping arrangements: Yes
- Auto-rack arrangements: Upp
- Catering facilities: No
- Observation facilities: Large windows
- Entertainment facilities: No
- Baggage facilities: Below the seats

Technical
- Rolling stock: LHB Coaches
- Track gauge: 1,676 mm (5 ft 6 in)
- Electrification: Fully Electrified
- Operating speed: 82 km/h (51 mph)

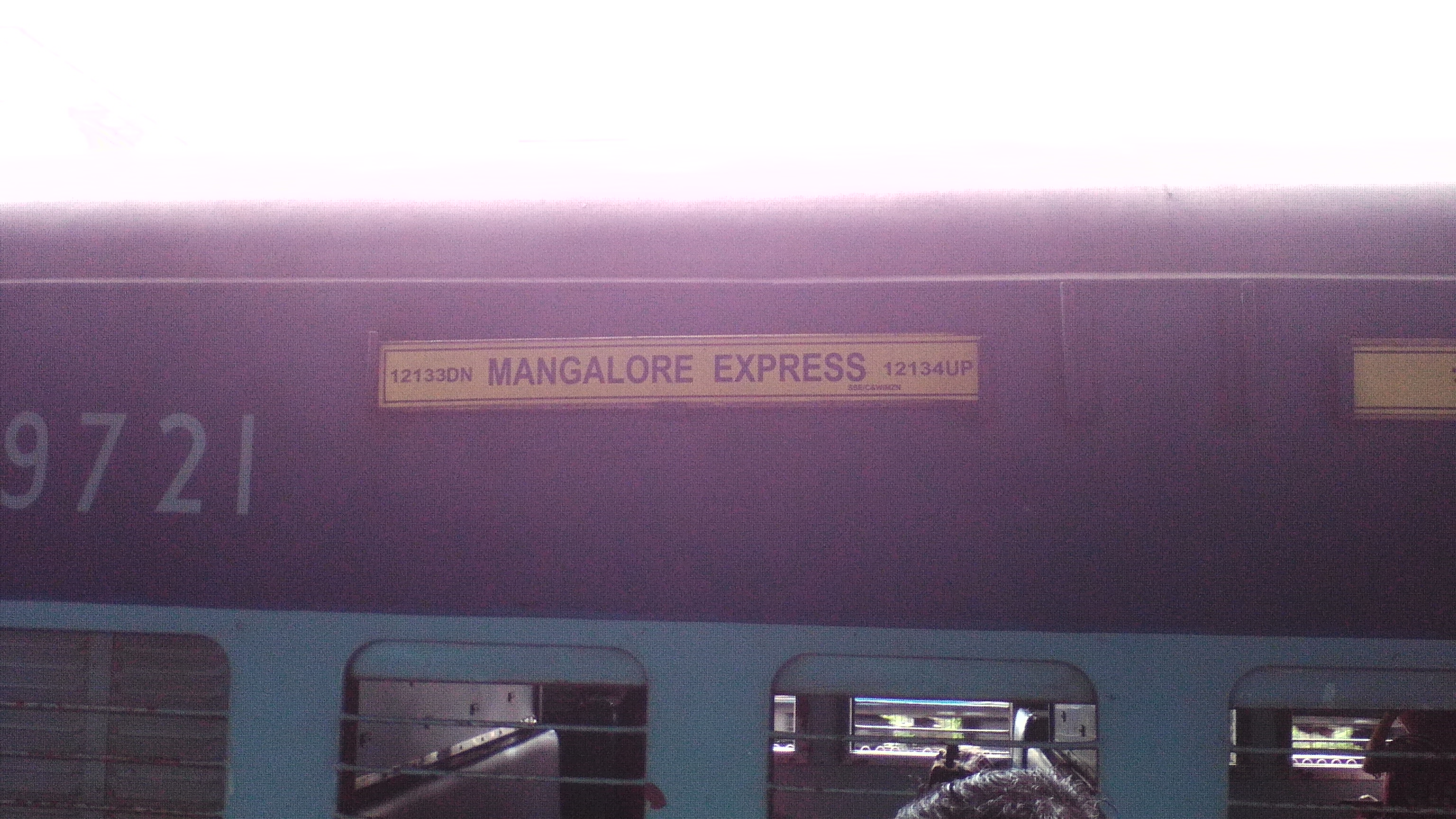
Coachboard of Mumbai Mangalore Express

The 12133 / 12134 Mangaluru Super Fast Express is the fastest Superfast Express train of the Indian Railways and runs between Chhatrapati Shivaji Maharaj Terminus Mumbai in Maharashtra and Mangaluru Junction of Karnataka. It is served daily with 12133/12134 trains.

== History ==
In 2009 it was run as Mumbai–Karwar Tri-weekly Superfast Express. On 14 August 2010 Union minister of State for Railways K. H. Muniyappa flagged off Mumbai CST–Karwar Tri-weekly Superfast Express Train, the service of then extended to the city from Mangalore Junction. Its frequency increased from tri weekly to daily. On 1 March 2025 it began running with LHB coaches.

The CSMT-Mangaluru Junction Superfast Expressin both direction is late always by two (2) to twelve (12) hours and is very unreliable though passengers are charged at Superfast express ticker fare.Also train is short terminated at Thane for past several months.

== Service ==
The important halts are:

- Mumbai CSMT
- Thane
- Panvel
- Ratnagiri
- Kankavli
- Sawantwadi Road (experimental halt, from July 2026)
- Karmali
- Madgaon Junction
- Karwar
- Kumta
- Bhatkal
- Mookambika Road Byndoor
- Kundapura
- Udupi
- Surathkal
- Mangalore Junction

== Coach composition ==
This train has standard LHB rakes with max speed 130 Kmph. It has new LHB coaches as of 1 March 2025 and carries 17 coaches.

Coach Composition

- 4 - General class (unreserved)
- 5 - Sleeper class
- 2 - AC 2 Tier coaches
- 3 - AC 3 Tier coaches
- 2 - General coach Divyangjan Friendly
- 1 - Generator car

Loco	1	2	3	4	5	6	7	8	9	10	11	12	13	14	15	16	17
	SLR	UR	UR	S1	S2	S3	S4	S5	B1	B2	B3	A2	A1	UR	UR	SLR	EOG

== Traction ==
It is hauled by a Kalyan Loco Shed based WAP-7 electric locomotive.

== See also ==
- Konkan Railway
- Matsyagandha Express
