= Kumta–Kacheguda Superfast Express =

Train in India

Kumta – Kacheguda Superfast Express

Overview
- Service type: Super fast Express
- Locale: Karnataka, Kerala, Tamilnadu, Telangana
- First service: 23 February 2013; 13 years ago
- Current operator: South Central Railway zone

Route
- Termini: Kumta (KT); Kacheguda (KCG)
- Stops: 35
- Distance travelled: 1,688 km (1,049 mi)
- Average journey time: 33h
- Service frequency: Bi-weekly (Note: Runs two days in a week for every direction.)
- Train number: 12789/12790

On-board services
- Classes: AC First Class, AC 2 Tier, AC 3 Tier, Sleeper Class, Pantry Car, General Unreserved
- Seating arrangements: No
- Sleeping arrangements: Yes
- Catering facilities: On-board catering E-catering
- Observation facilities: LHB coach
- Entertainment facilities: No
- Baggage facilities: No
- Other facilities: Below the seats

Technical
- Rolling stock: LHB coach
- Track gauge: 1,676 mm (5 ft 6 in)
- Electrification: yes
- Operating speed: 59 km/h (37 mph), including halts
Route map
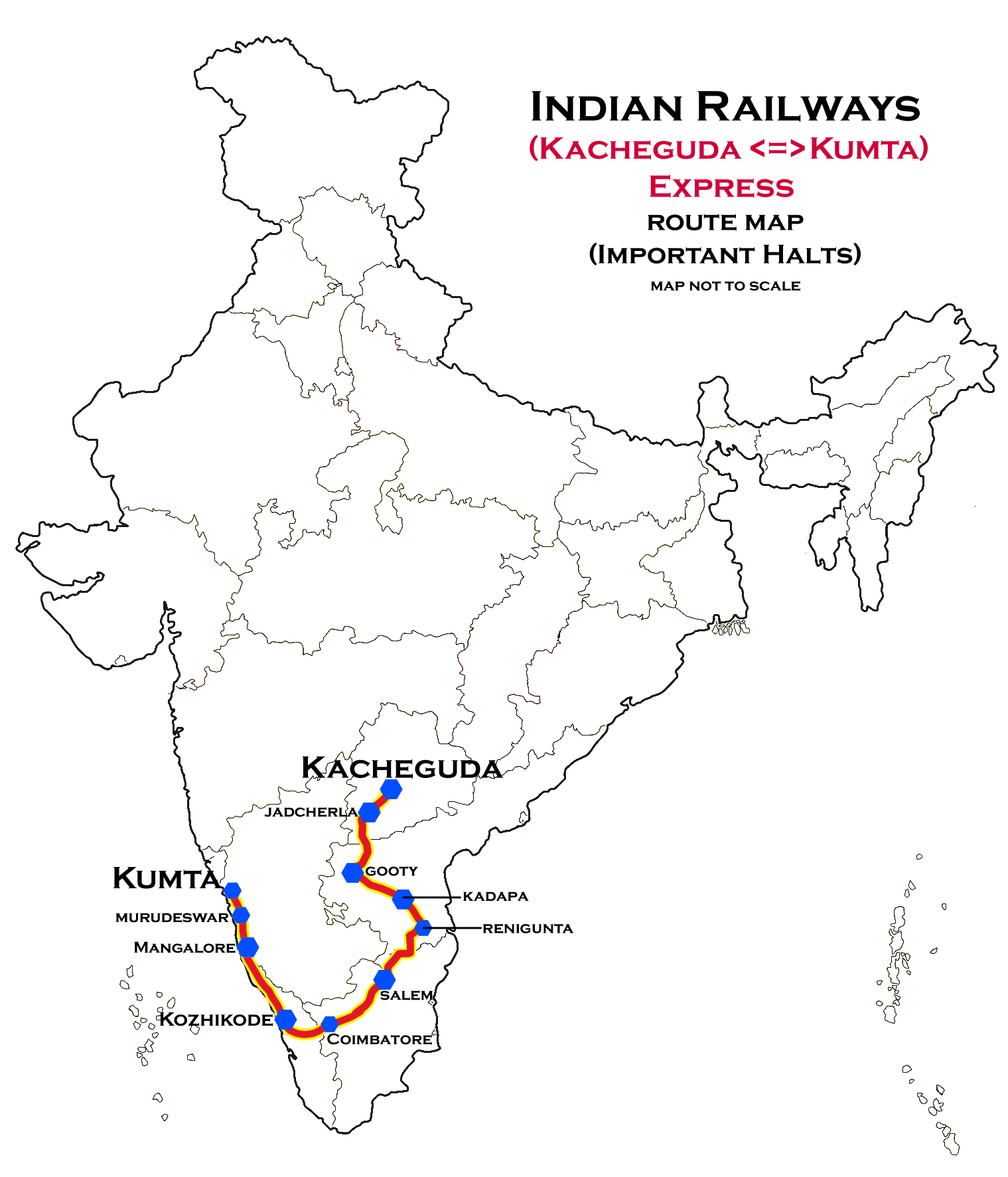

The 12789 / 12790 Kumta–Kacheguda Superfast Express is an Superfast Express train belonging to South Central Railway zone that runs between Kumtaof Karnataka and Kacheguda (Hyderabad) of Telangana in India.

== Service ==
The 12790/Kumta –Kacheguda SF Express has an average speed of 53 km/h and covers 1688 km in 33h. The 12789/Kacheguda–Kumta SF Express has an average speed of 52 km/h and covers 1688 km in 33h 20m.

== Route and halts ==
The important halts of the train are:-

- Kumta
- Murudeshwar
- Bhatkal
- Mookambika Road Byndoor
- Kundapura
- Barkur
- Udupi
- Mulki
- Surathkal
- Mangaluru Central
- Kasaragod
- Kanhangad
- Nileshwar
- Payyanur
- Kannur
- Thalassery
- Vadakara
- Kozhikode
- Tirur
- Shoranur Junction
- Palakkad Junction
- Coimbatore Junction
- Tiruppur
- Erode Junction
- Salem Junction
- Jolarpettai Junction
- Katpadi Junction
- Renigunta Junction
- Razampeta
- Kadapa
- Yerraguntla Junction
- Gooty Junction
- Dhone Junction
- Kurnool City
- Gadwal
- Mahbubnagar
- Jadcherla
- Kacheguda

== Coach composition ==
The train has standard LHB rakes with a maximum speed of 130 km/h. The train consists of 22 coaches:

- 1 AC First Class
- 2 AC II Tier
- 6 AC III Tier
- 6 Sleeper coaches
- 4 General Unreserved
- 1 End On Generator cum Luggage Rake
- 1 Pantry Car
- 1 SLR

== Traction ==
Earlier was Gooty-based WDP-4D. Both trains are hauled Erode Loco Shed & Lalaguda Loco shed-based WAP-4 & WAP-7 electric locomotive from Mangalore to Kacheguda.

== Rake reversal or rake share ==
The train will reverse 1 time :

1. Mangaluru Central

The train shares its rake with Kacheguda–Madurai Weekly Express (22715/22716).

== See also ==
- Kacheguda railway station
- Mangalore Junction railway station
- Kacheguda–Madurai Weekly Express
