= Kabaka Puttur railway station =

Railway station in Karnataka, India

General information
- Location: Railway Station Rd, Padil, Puttur, Dakshina Kannada, Karnataka 574201; India
- Coordinates: 12.7648°N 75.1842°E
- Elevation: 87 metres (285 ft)
- System: Indian Railways station
- Owner: Indian Railways
- Operator: South Western Railway
- Line: Mangalore–Hassan–Mysore line
- Platforms: 2

Construction
- Structure type: Standard (on-ground station)

Other information
- Status: Functioning
- Station code: KBPR
- Zone(s): South Western Railway
- Division(s): Mysore
- Fare zone: South Western Railway

History
- Opened: 1979
- Closed: 1996 (for gauge conversion)
- Rebuilt: 2005

Services
| Preceding station | Indian Railways | Following station |
|---|---|---|
| Neralakatte Halt towards Mysore Junction | Mangalore–Hassan–Mysore line | Narimogaru towards Mangalore Central |
Route map
- Source: Google Maps, Kannur - KSR Bengaluru Express (via Mysuru)
Location
- Location within India Location within Karnataka

Kabaka Puttur is a major railway station on Mangalore–Hassan–Mysore line. It is located in Padil,Puttur, Dakshina Kannada district, Karnataka state, India. It consists of two platforms. It is named after two places: Kabaka which is 5 km away from railway station location and Puttur where railway station lies. The railway station lies 1.2 km away from Puttur KSRTC bus stand and 1.1 km away from Puttur–Uppinangadi Main Road

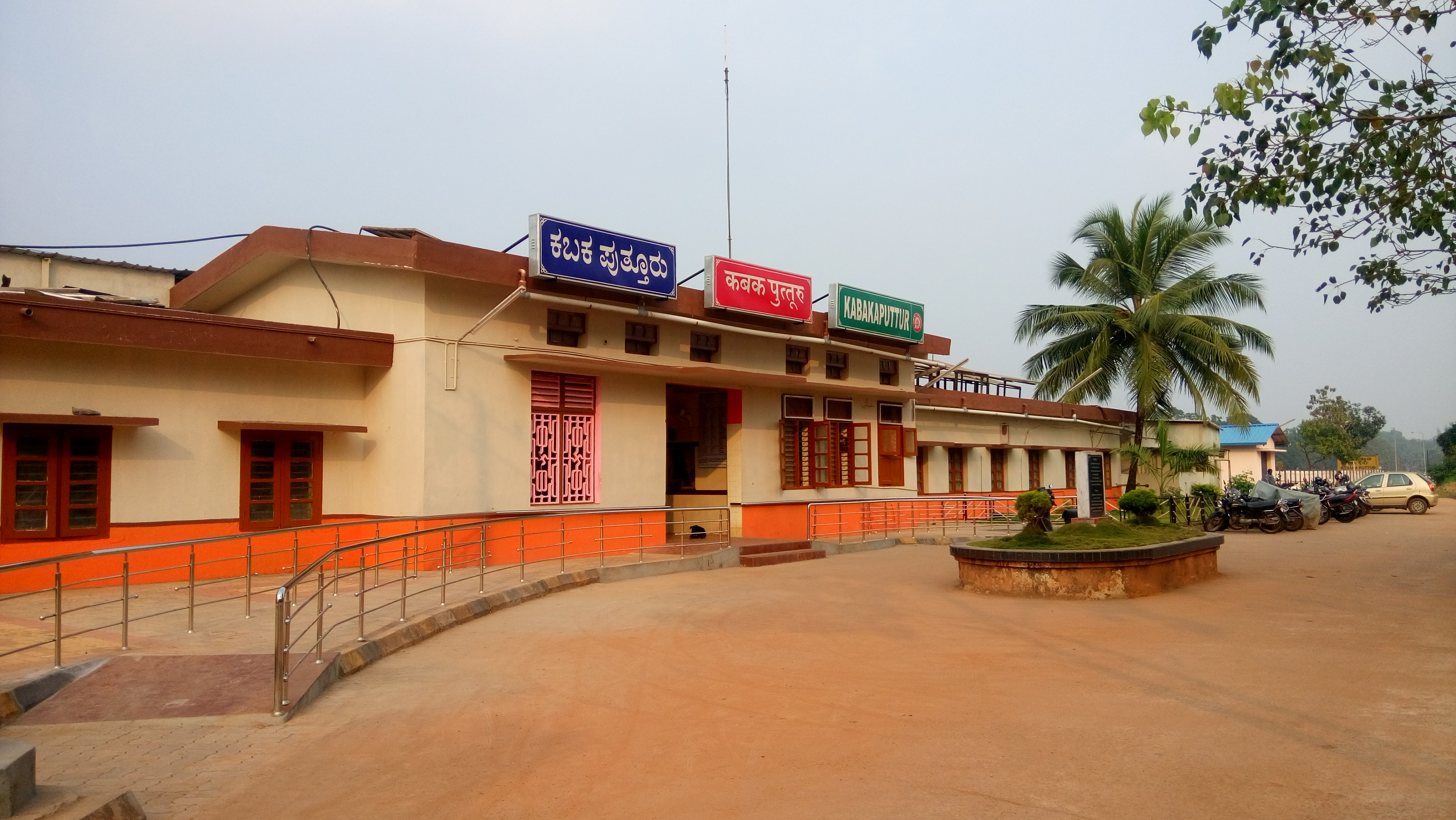
Kabaka Puttur railway station in Puttur, Dakshina Kannada, Karnataka

== Location ==
Kabaka Puttur Railway Station serves Puttur city of Dakshina Kannada district. It belongs to Mysuru railway division part of South Western Railway zone of Indian Railways.

== Services ==
There are several trains to Mangaluru, Karwar, Kannur, Vijayapura, Yesvantpur, Bengaluru, Mysuru, Hubballi which stops at Kabaka Puttur railway station.

| Train number | Train name |
|---|---|
| 17377/17378 | Mangaluru Central–Vijayapura Express |
| 16511/16512 | KSR Bengaluru–Kozhikode Express (via Kunigal) |
| 16515/16516 | Yesvantpur–Karwar Express |
| 16585/16586 | Murudeshwar-SMVT Bengaluru Express(via Mangaluru Central,Mysuru) |
| 16575/16576 | Gomteshwara Express |
| 16539/16540 | Yesvantpur-Mangaluru Junction Weekly Express(via Kunigal) |
| 16595/16596 | Panchaganga Express |
| 56642/56643 | Mangaluru Central–Kabaka Puttur Passenger (unreserved) |
| 56644/56645 | Kabaka Puttur–Mangaluru Central Passenger (unreserved) |
| 56646/56647 | Subrahmanya Road–Mangaluru Central Passenger (unreserved) |
