= Bantwala railway station =

Railway station in Karnataka, India

Bantawala railway station
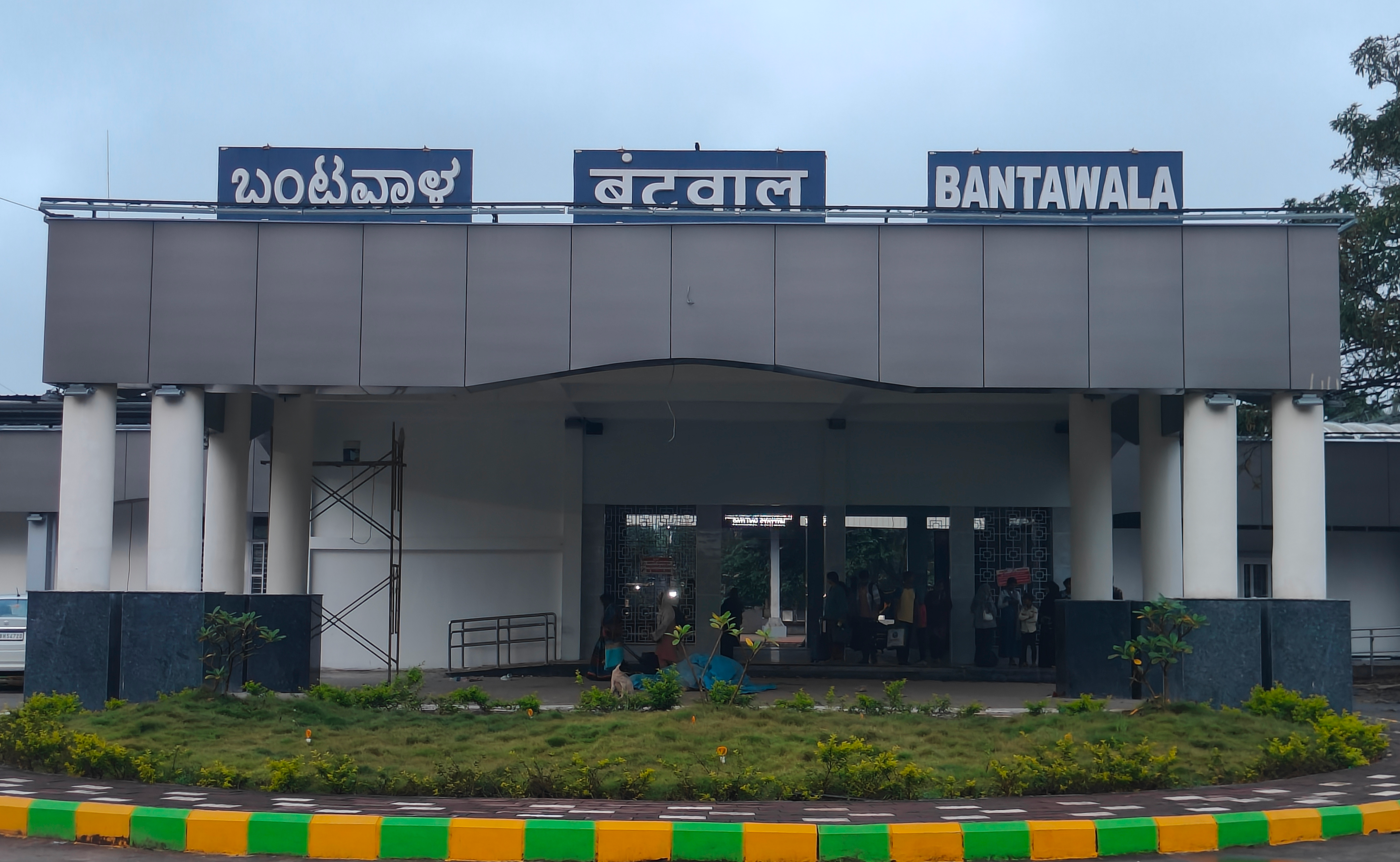

General information
- Location: 11-270-2, Kaikunja East Road, B.C Road, Bantwal, Karnataka - 574219; India
- Coordinates: 12.8781784°N 75.0318748°E
- System: Indian Railways station
- Owner: Indian Railways
- Operator: South Western Railway
- Line: Mangalore–Hassan–Mysore line
- Platforms: 2

Construction
- Structure type: Standard (on-ground station)

Other information
- Status: Functioning
- Station code: BNTL
- Zone(s): South Western Railway
- Division(s): Mysore
- Fare zone: South Western Railway

History
- Opened: 1979
- Closed: 1979(for gauge conversion)
- Rebuilt: 2005
- Electrified: Electrification in progress

Services
Preceding station	Indian Railways	Following station
Kalladka Halt towards Mysore Junction	Mangalore–Hassan–Mysore line	Farangipete towards Mangalore Central
Route map
- Source: Google Maps, Kannur - KSR Bengaluru Express (via Mysuru)
Location
- Location within India Location within Karnataka

Bantwala or Bantawala is a major railway station on Mangalore–Hassan–Mysore line. It is located in BC Road, Bantwal, Dakshina Kannada district, Karnataka state, India. It consists of two platforms. This railway station is nearest railway station to National Highway in Dakshina Kannada district. This railway station is located just 500 meters away from NH 75 and three kilometers away from Bantwal city. The station is currently being renovated under the Amrit Bharat Scheme.

== Location ==
Bantwala Railway Station serves Bantwal city of Dakshina Kannada district. It belongs to Mysuru railway division part of South Western Railway zone of Indian Railways.

== Services ==
There are several trains to Mangaluru, Puttur, Subrahmanya, Karwar, Calicut , Vijayapura, Yesvantpur, Bengaluru, Mysuru, Hubballi which stops at Bantwal railway station.

Train number	Train name
07377/07378	Mangaluru Junction–Vijayapura Express Special
16511/16512	KSR Bengaluru– Kozhikode Express (via Kunigal, Hassan, Sakleshpura, Subharamanya Road, Mangalore Central, Kannur )
16515/16516	Yesvantpur–Karwar Express
16585/16586	Mangaluru Central-SMVT Bengaluru Express(via Mysuru)
16575/16576	Gomteshwara Express
16539/16540	Yesvantpur-Mangaluru Junction Weekly Express(via Kunigal)
16595/16596	Panchaganga Express
56642/56643	Mangaluru Central–Kabaka Puttur Passenger (unreserved)
56644/56645	Kabaka Puttur–Mangaluru Central Passenger (unreserved)
56646/56647	Subrahmanya Road–Mangaluru Central Passenger (unreserved)
