= Matsyagandha Express =

Train in India

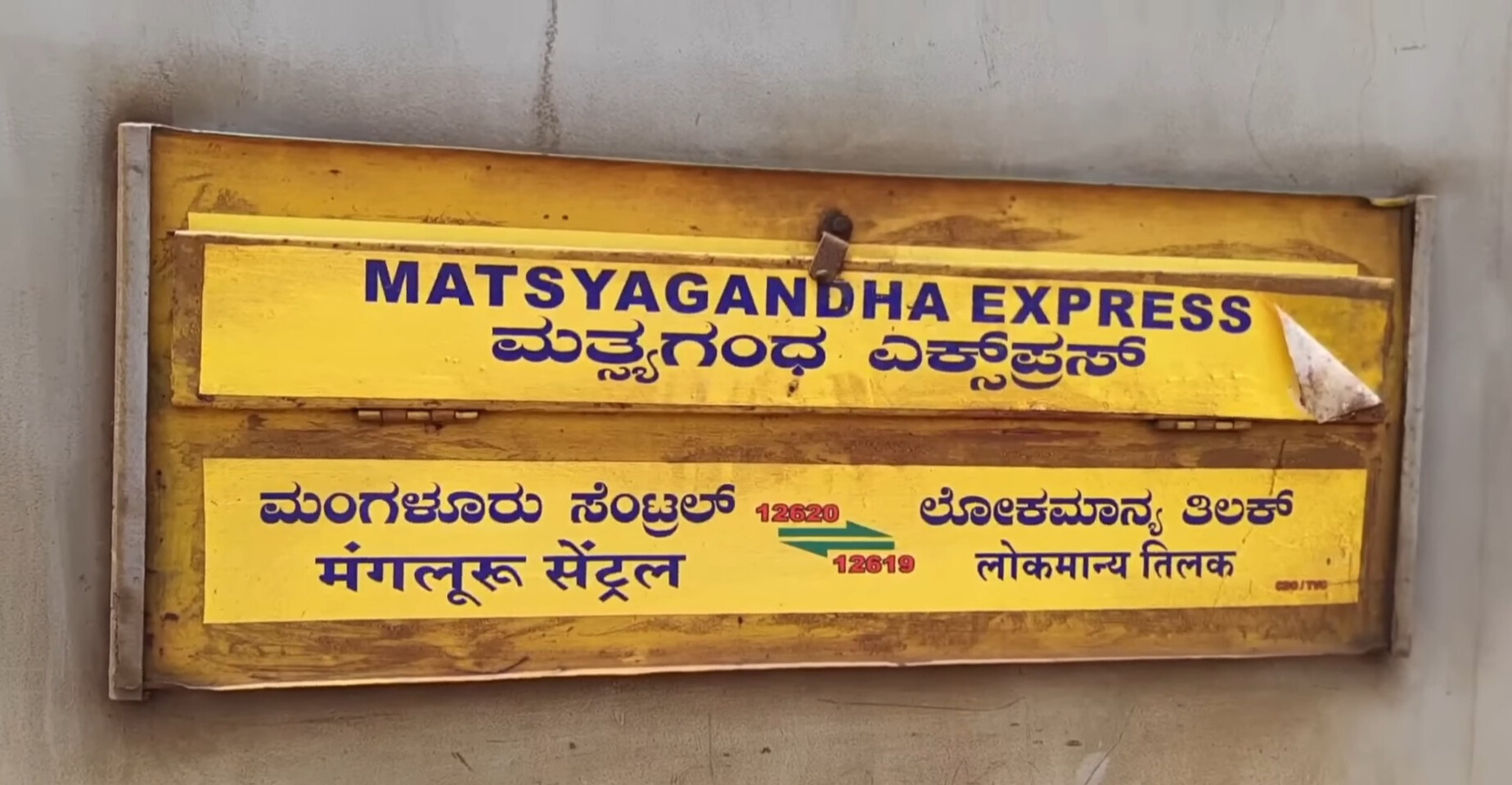

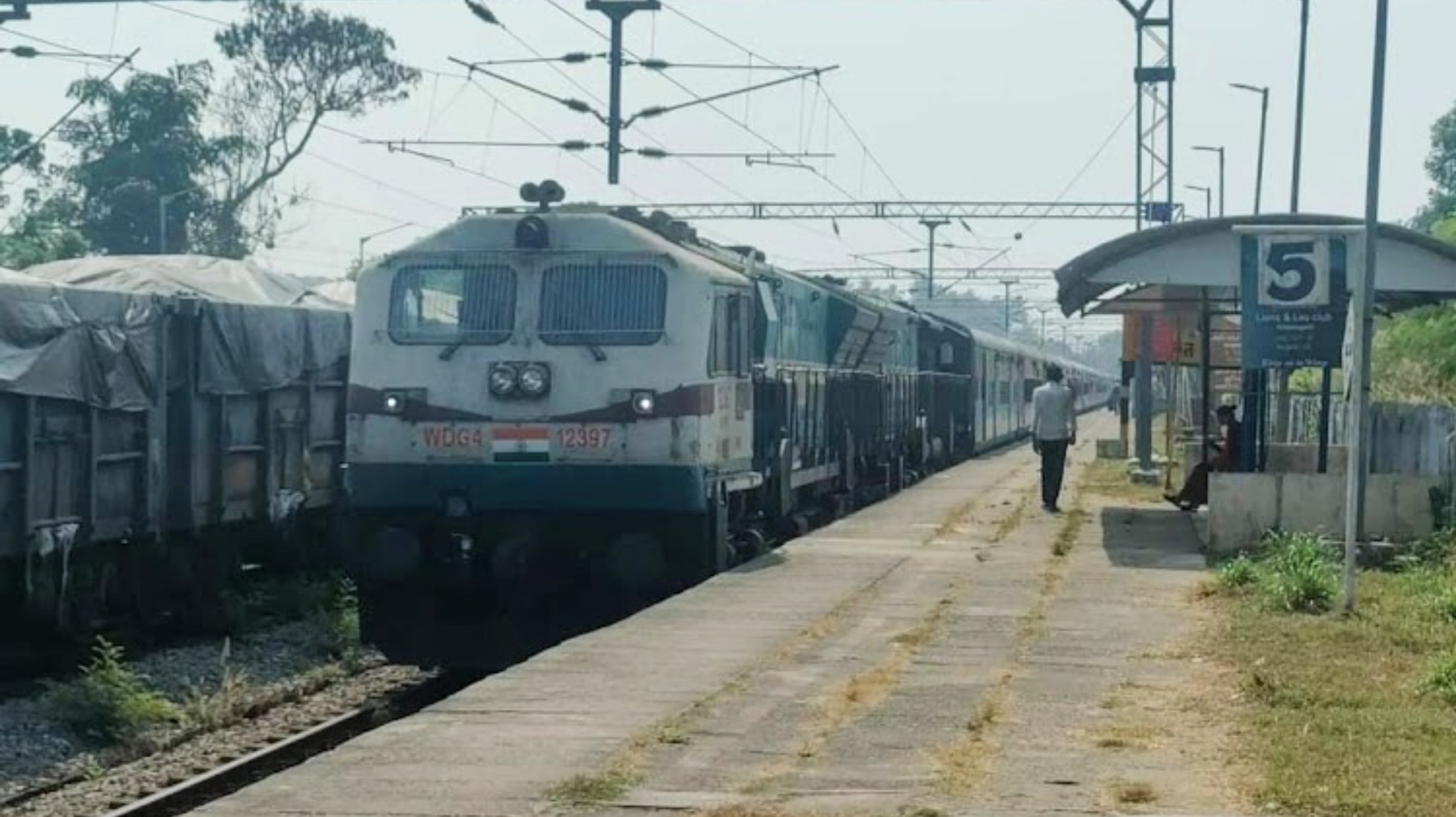
- Mangaluru Central to Mumbai LTT Mathsyagandha Superfast Express

Overview
- Service type: Superfast Express
- Status: Daily Running
- Locale: Maharashtra, Goa & Karnataka
- First service: 1 May 1998; 28 years ago
- Current operator: Southern Railway
- Ridership: Daily

Route
- Termini: Mumbai LTT (LTT); Mangaluru Central (MAQ)
- Stops: 21
- Distance travelled: 1,169 km (726 mi)
- Average journey time: 16 hrs 10 mins
- Service frequency: Daily
- Train number: 12619 / 12620

On-board services
- Classes: AC Three tier economy, AC 2 Tier, AC 3 Tier, Sleeper Class, General Unreserved
- Seating arrangements: Yes
- Sleeping arrangements: Yes
- Catering facilities: On-board catering, E-catering
- Observation facilities: Large windows
- Baggage facilities: No
- Other facilities: Below the seats

Technical
- Rolling stock: LHB coach
- Track gauge: 1,676 mm (5 ft 6 in)
- Electrification: Yes
- Operating speed: 74 km/h (46 mph) Average including halts.
Route map
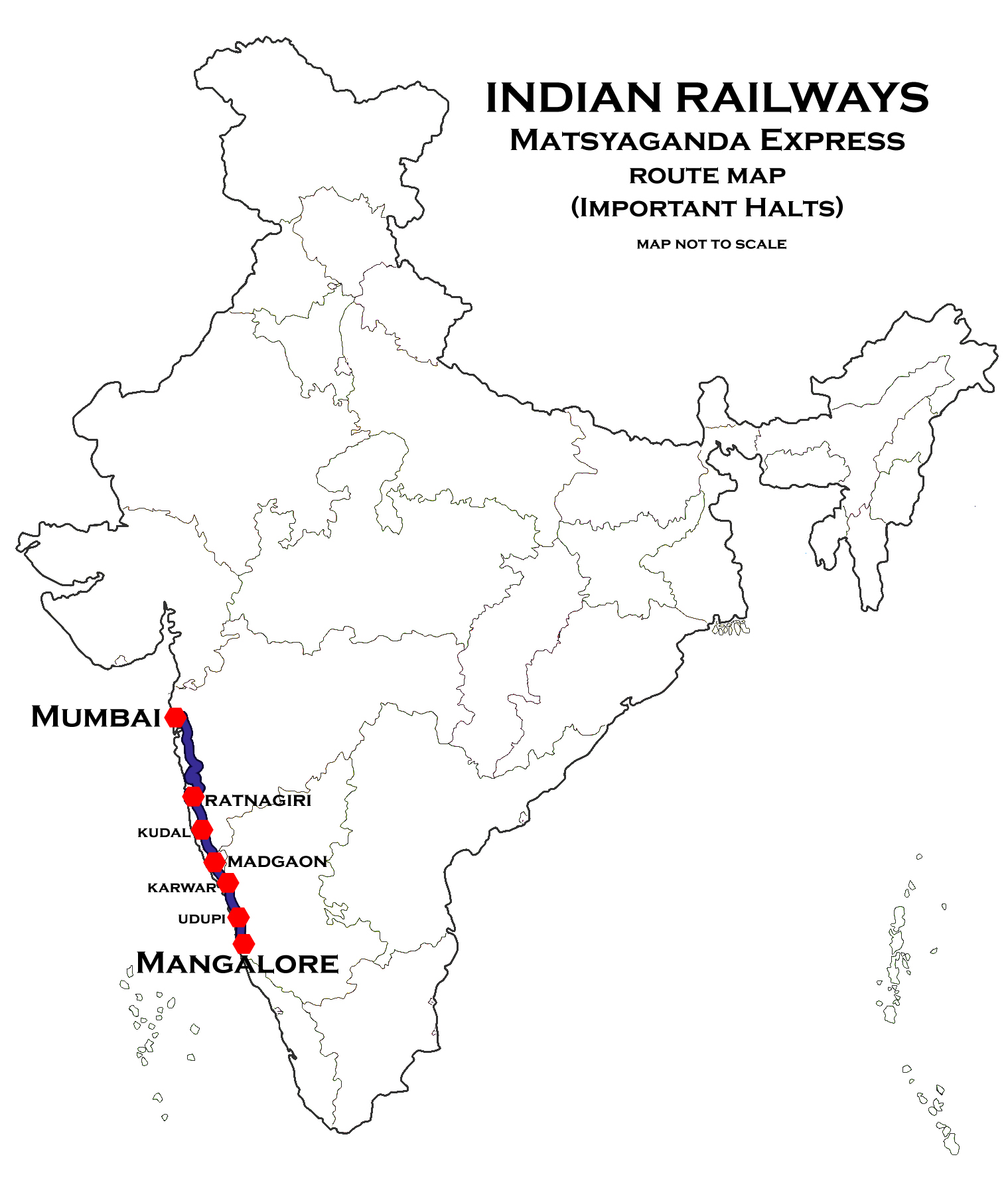

The 12619 / 12620 Matsyagandha Express is a Daily Superfast Express train running between Lokmanya Tilak Terminus (Mumbai) in Maharashtra and Mangaluru Central In Karnataka. It is also called Lifeline of the Mangaluru.

The train was introduced on 1 May 1998 as Mangalore-Kurla Express. The Matsyagandha Express travels through some of the difficult terrains of India. Matsyagandha Express ( Train number 02619 run as special) travelling from Lokmanya Tilak Terminus, Mumbai (LTT) to Mangaluru Central became first train to take Roha-Veer double line on Konkan railway route on 30 August 2021 at 7.30p.m. It is the convenient train to travel daily from Mumbai to Mangaluru in 16.5 hours. The Matsyagandha Superfast Express runs with brand new LHB Coaches from Mangaluru Central on 17 February 2025.

== History ==
The Matsyagandha Express was named by Mr. Ramchandra Sawalekar, a gazetted officer in the Indian Navy. Matsyagandha literally means "Fragnance of Fish" - the appellation was given since the train runs along the fishing coast of Western India adjoining the Arabian Sea–Konkan Railway route. The name is based on a character from the epic Mahabharata, Satyavati who was dubbed the moniker of Matsyagandha due to the fragrance of fish that emanated from her. Matsyagandha is also a famous Marathi musical play written by Vasant Kanetkar. The train has become important link and emotional chord for natives of Dakshina Kannada, Udupi and Uttara Kannada districts living in Mumbai and surrounding cities.

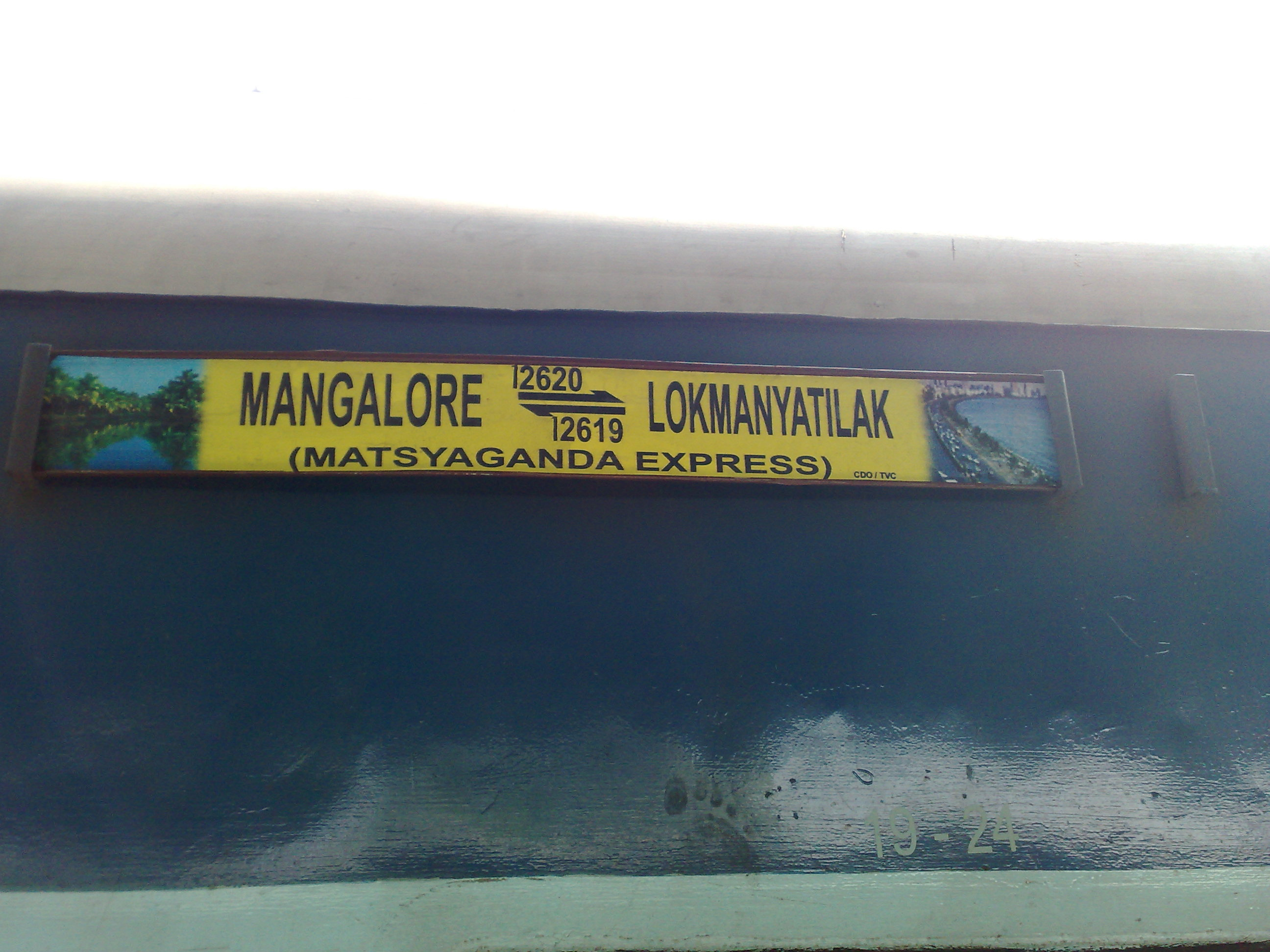
Matsyaganda Express trainboard

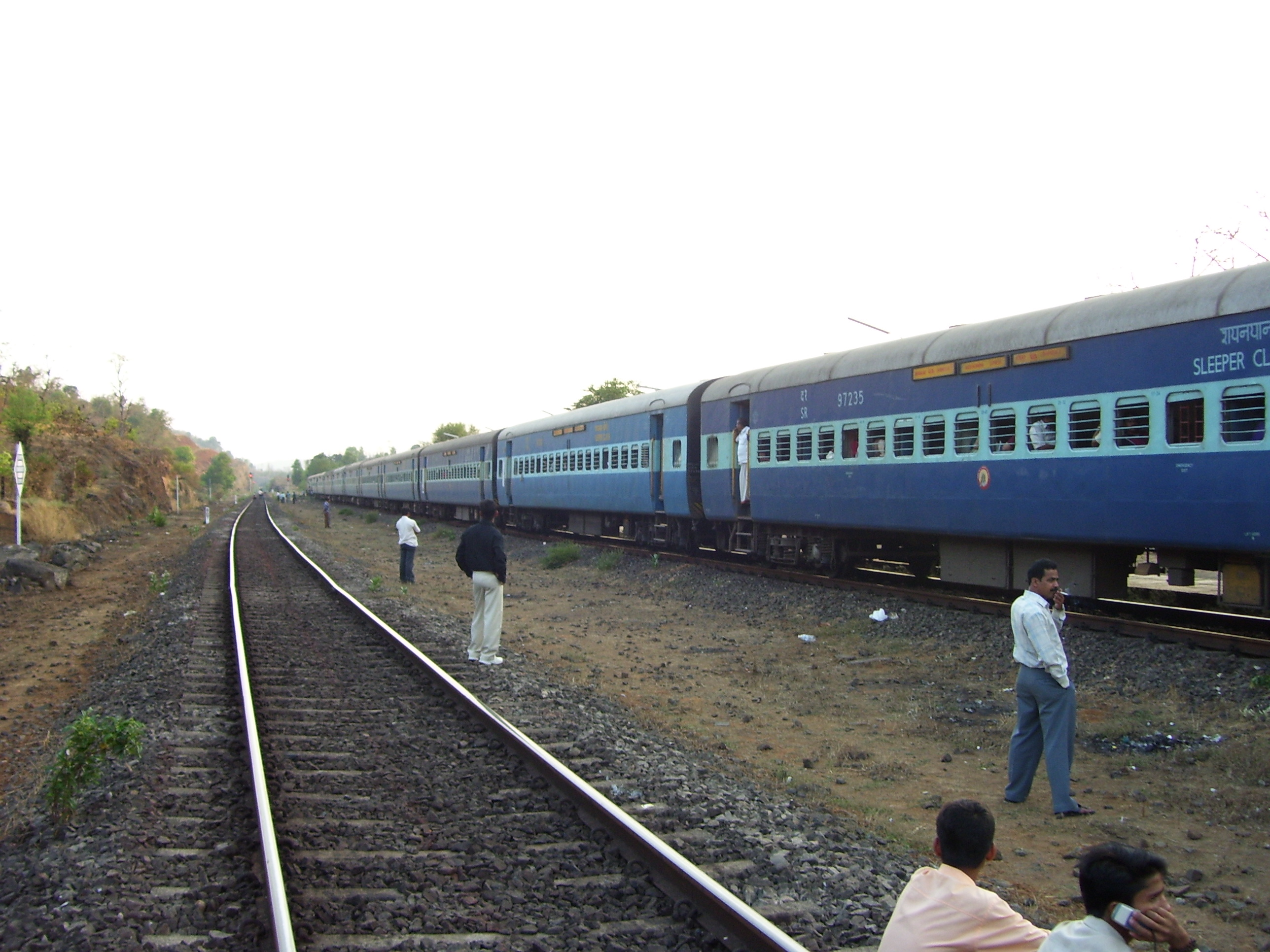
Matsyagandha Express Train

== Locomotion ==
As the entire route is electrified, a Royapuram Loco Shed or Erode Loco Shed based WAP-7 electric locomotive hauls the train from end-to-end.

== Route and halts ==
- Mumbai Lokmanya Tilak (T)
- Thane
- Panvel
- Mangaon
- Khed
- Chiplun
- Ratnagiri
- Kudal
- Madgaon Junction
- Karwar
- Ankola
- Gokarna Road
- Kumta
- Honnavar
- Murudeshwar
- Bhatkal
- Mookambika Road Byndoor
- Kundapura
- Barkur
- Udupi
- Mulki
- Surathkal
- Mangalore Central

== Arrival and departure ==
12619 Matsyagandha Express departs Lokmanya Tilak Terminus, Mumbai at 15:20 and reaches Mangaluru Central (MAQ) at 7.30 a.m. the next day, while 12620 Matsyagandha Express departs Mangaluru Central(MAQ)railway station at 14.35 and reaches Lokmanya Tilak Terminus, Mumbai at 6:35 the next day. However, during monsoon (rainy season) the train has different time table. The monsoon time table of Konkan railway Corporation Limited is generally from 15 June to 30 September of every year.

== Coach composition ==
The train was upgraded to modern LHB rake on 18 February 2025, with an MPS of 145 km/h. The train consists of 24 coaches:

- 1 AC II Tier coach
- 4 AC III Tier coaches
- 2 AC III Tier Economy coaches
- 9 Sleeper coaches
- 4 Sitting coaches
- 2 General coaches
- 1 General coach Divyangjan Friendly
- 1 Generator cars

Loco	1	2	3	4	5	6	7	8	9	10	11	12	13	14	15	16	17	18	19	20	21	22	23	24
	SLR	UR	D1	D2	S1	S2	S3	S4	S5	S6	S7	S8	S9	M2	M1	B4	B3	B2	B1	A1	D3	D4	UR	EOG

- (Coach Position of 12619 Matsyagandha Express)
- Rake Sharing 16347/16348 Thiruvananthapuram Central - Mangalore Central - Thiruvananthapuram Central Express

== Incidents ==
This service had a major incident on 16 June 2004, known as the Karanjadi train crash. A train derailed and fell off a bridge after colliding with boulders on the tracks, killing 20 people near Karanjadi station.

== See also ==
- Mumbai CST–Mangaluru Junction Superfast Express
