= Kabaka (disambiguation) =

Kabaka may refer to:

- Kabaka of Buganda, the title of the king of Buganda
- Kabaka Puttur, a village in the state of Karnataka, India
- Silas Kabaka, Sense8 character
- Ahmed Khaled, Egyptian footballer (born 2005), also known as Kabaka
