= Subrahmanya Road railway station =

Railway station in Karnataka, India

Subrahmanya Road

General information
- Location: Railway Station Rd, Dakshina Kannada district, Karnataka; India
- Coordinates: 12.7315°N 75.5579°E
- Elevation: 121 metres (397 ft)
- System: Indian Railways station
- Owner: Indian Railways
- Operator: South Western Railway
- Line: Mangalore–Hassan–Mysore line
- Platforms: 3

Construction
- Structure type: Standard (on ground station)

Other information
- Status: Functioning
- Station code: SBHR
- Zone(s): South Western Railway
- Division(s): Mysore
- Fare zone: South Western Railway

History
- Opened: 1979
- Closed: 1996 (for gauge conversion)
- Rebuilt: 2005

Services
Preceding station	Indian Railways	Following station
Bajakere Halt towards Mysore Junction	Mangalore–Hassan–Mysore line	Shiribagilu towards Mangalore Central
Route map
- Source: Google Maps, Kannur - KSR Bengaluru Express (via Mysuru)
Location
- Location within India Location within Karnataka

Subrahmanya Road is a railway station on Mangalore–Hassan–Mysore line. It is located in Dakshina Kannada district of Karnataka state, India. The station consists of three platforms, which are not well sheltered.The station is located at Nettana. The railway line(track) from Hassan to Mangaluru was converted from Metre gauge to Broad gauge by creation of joint venture company HMRDC between Government of Karnataka and Ministry of Railways to finance the gauge conversion. Few amenities have been upgraded in recent past The next railway station is Shrivagilu railway station towards Sakleshapura and preceding rail station from Mangaluru Junction is Bajakere (BAJE).

Rail engines (Locomotive) bankers or helper engines are attached or detached at Subramanya road rail station for both passenger and goods trains going to or coming from Sakleshpura railway station through Western Ghats (Paschima Ghatta).

== Location ==
Subrahmanya Road railway station at Nettana serves Subramanya village in Dakshina Kannada district where Kukke Subramanya Temple is located at distance of twelve kilometre from railroad station. It belongs to Mysore railway division, part of South Western Railway zone of Indian Railways. Karnataka State Road Transport Corporation (KSRTC) operates few buses from this railway station at Nettana to Kukke Subramanya.The Subramanya road train station is situated at altitude of one hundred twenty (120) metres above mean sea level.

== Services ==
There are several trains to Mysore, Kannur, Karwar, Bengaluru, Vijayapura, Yesvantpur and Mangaluru that stop at Subrahmanya Road station:

Number	Train Name
07377 / 07378	Vijayapura–Mangaluru Express Special
16511 / 16512	KSR Bengaluru–Kannur Express (via Kunigal)
16515 / 16516	Yesvantpur–Karwar Express
16575 / 16576	Gomteshwara Express (Yesvantpur–Mangaluru Junction)
16539/16540	Yesvantpur-Mangaluru Junction Weekly Express
16585 / 16586	KSR Bengaluru–Mangaluru Central Express(via Mysuru)
56646 / 56647	Subrahmanya Road–Mangaluru Central Passenger (unreserved)
16595/16596	Panchaganga Express(KSR Bengaluru-Karwar)
