= Yedakumeri =

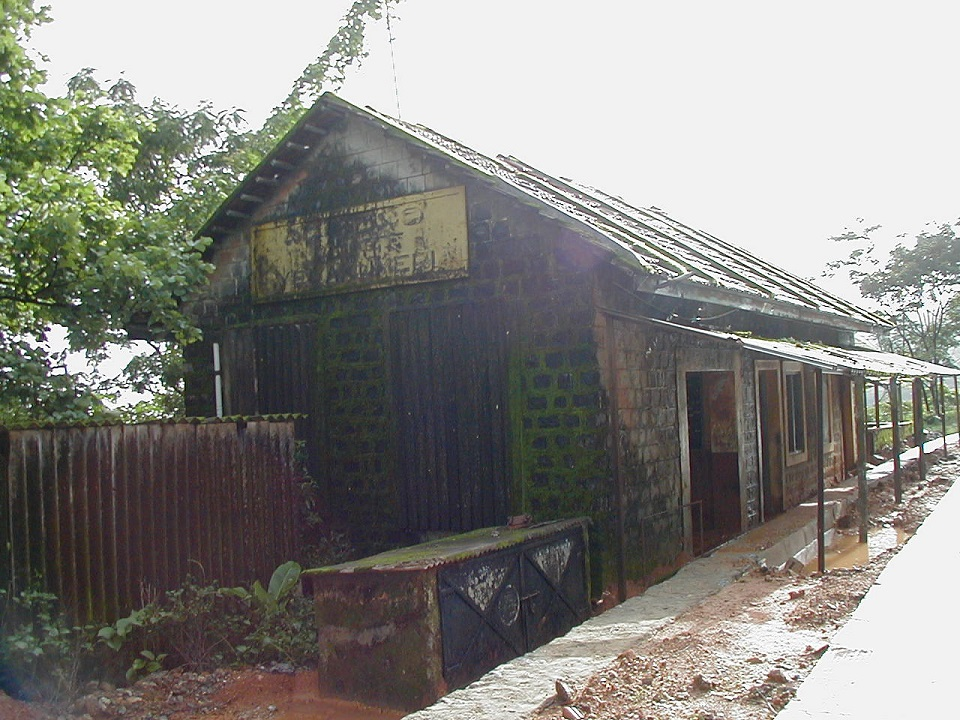
The abandoned railway station at Yedakumeri

Yedakumari or Yedakumeri is a place in Sakleshpur taluk,Hassan district in the midst of Western Ghats in the state of Karnataka, India. There is a railway station here having station code YDK and next railway station (westwards) is Shrivagilu railway station towards Mangalore Junction railway station The place lies en route Mangalore to Bangalore railway line and is the most fascinating stretch of the Green route. The gauge conversion from metre gauge to broad gauge of railway track(line) between Hassan and Mangaluru was financed by Hassan Mangalore Rail Development Company (HMRDC) a joint venture of Government of Karnataka and Ministry of Railways. This railway station is located at an altitude of 576 metres above mean sea level The train running in between these two cities generally halt at Yedakumari for technical reasons. Yedakumari railway station has become resting place for trekkers who are trekking the western ghats following the railway tracks. There are reports of movement of Wild Elephants and other wild animals along this railway track.

== See also ==
- Mangalore–Hassan–Mysore line
- Konkan Railway Corporation
