= Mangalore–Hassan–Mysore line =

Railway route in India

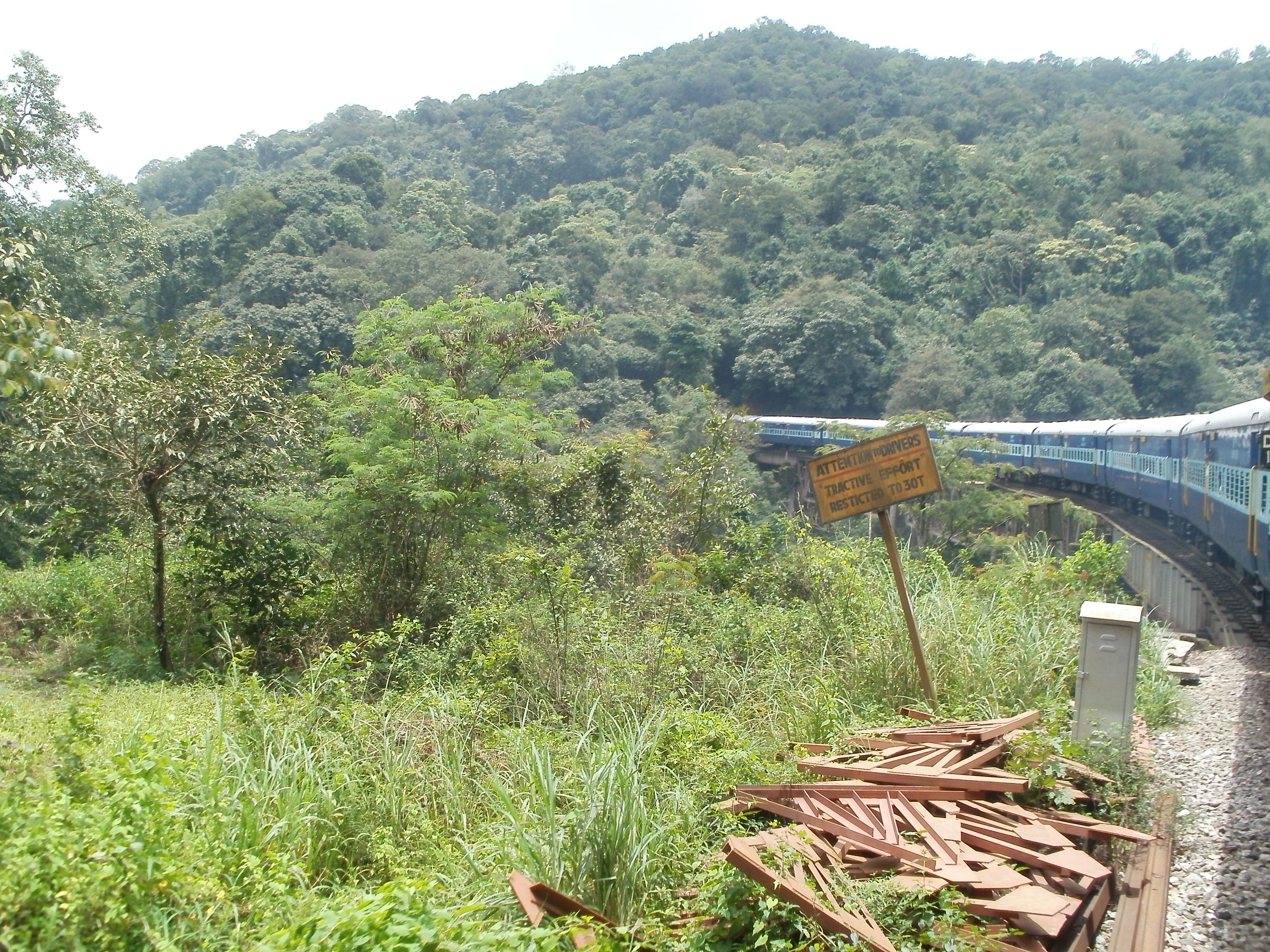
- A train crosses the Western Ghats in Karnataka, between Subramanya and Sakleshpur, in August 2011

Overview
- Status: Operational
- Owner: Indian Railways
- Locale: Karnataka, India
- Termini: Mangalore Central; Mysore Junction

Service
- Operator: South Western Railway

History
- Opened: 20 May 1979 (Mangalore–Hassan section); 3 January 1918 (Hassan–Mysore section)

Technical
- Track length: 309 km (192 mi)
- Number of tracks: 1
- Track gauge: 5 ft 6 in (1,676 mm) broad gauge
- Old gauge: 1,000 mm (3 ft 3 3/8 in) Metre gauge
- Electrification: Yes

Mangalore–Hassan–Mysore line is a railway route of South Western Railway zone of Indian Railways. This route plays an important role in rail transportation of Mysore division of Karnataka state.

The corridor passes through the Western Ghats and the Mysore Plateau, connecting the mainland to the coastal areas of Karnataka with a stretch of 309 km with one reversal direction at Hassan Junction.

It is divided into two sections: Mangalore Central — Hassan Junction and Hassan Junction — Mysore Junction.

== History ==
The main railway line from Hassan to Mangalore section was originally built as a metre-gauge line and was opened in small sections between 1976 and 1977, inaugurated finally on 20 May 1979 for passenger transportation. 17 years later it was closed for gauge conversion, on 20 September 1996. The ghat sub-section between Sakleshpur and Subrahmanya Road was considered a challenging section. The gauge conversion of this section was handed over to a Special Purpose Vehicle (SPV), formed for the task – the Hassan Mangalore Rail Development Company Limited (HMRDC). The company has the Government of Karnataka and the Railway Ministry as majority stakeholders, while Mangalore port trust and several other agencies as minority stakeholders.

The gauge conversion took a very long time and is marked in red-letters in the Indian Railways' history. Although the first section after the conversion was opened in January 1998, the rest of the works were done at very slow pace. The first sub-section to be opened was Hassan Junction – Sakleshpur, a distance of about 42 km. The next stretch to be inaugurated was between Mangalore Central and Kabaka Puttur, a distance of about 44 km, opened in December 2003. Another section of the line from Kabaka Puttur to Subrahmanya Road, 42 km, was opened in July 2005. The remaining final stretch (Sakleshpur–Subrahmanya), a ghat section with 1 in 55 grades all along, was opened in May 2006 for freight services and in December 2007 for passenger operations.Since 2020, the number of passenger train movement capacity in this route has been enhanced by HMRDC.

As per the Railway Budget 1995–96, the Hassan–Mysore section was also proposed to gauge conversion to 5ft 6in broad gauge. Before that, the Hassan–Mysore section was also opened on 3 January 1918 as a metre-gauge line.

== Railway stations ==
Mangalore Central, Mangalore Junction (MAJN), Bantawala (BNTL),Neralakatte(NRF),Kabaka Puttur(KBPR), NariMogaru (NRJ), Kaniyooru railway station (KNYR), Yedamangala(YDM), Kodimbala (KDBA), Bajekere (Baje), Subrahmanya Road (SBHR), Shribagilu (SVGL),Yedakumeri (YDK), Kadgaravalli (KGVL), Donigal(DOGL),and Sakleshpura(SKLR), Balupet(BLLT), Alur (ALUR), Hassan Junction (HAS).The railway distance between Mangalore Central and Hassan is 188.760 kilometre and Mangalore Junction and Hassan is 183.190 km. The route is through hills and forests of Western Ghats (Paschima Ghatta) of Karnataka state.

== Electrification ==
The electrification work started in December 2023.

- Mysore–Hassan Section (119 km): Fully Electrified. The final 32 km stretch between Holenarasipura and Hassan was completed and inspected in late March 2024, finishing the electrification of the entire 119 km section.
- Hassan–Mangalore Section (including Ghat section):
  - The electrification of the Mangalore – Subrahmanya Roadsection was completed in phases and regular electric train services commenced from 15 September 2025.
  - The section between Sakleshpur and Subrahmanya Road (55 km), which passes through the challenging Shiradi Ghat, was the final hurdle due to steep terrain and forest clearances. The Mysore Division of South Western Railway has finished electrifying the Sakleshpur–Subramanya Road ghat section, with a successful electric locomotive trial on 28 December 2025. This 55-km stretch on the Hassan–Mangalore route, known for its difficult terrain in the Western Ghats (including 1-in-50 gradients, 57 tunnels, 258 bridges, and 108 sharp curves), underwent electrification at a cost of Rs 93.55 crore, starting in December 2023. The project involved building five switching stations and overhead equipment for a maximum speed of 120 kmph, including 419 brackets installed in tunnels. The work faced challenges due to heavy rains, landslides, and difficult access. Officials anticipate electric locomotives will now operate on this section. The project involved the construction of five switching stations along the route and overhead electrification of the entire section. The overhead equipment has been designed for a maximum speed of 120 kmph, with the maximum span between two traction poles limited to 67.5 metres, ensuring safety and operational reliability.

== Projects ==
At present as on 13 June 2026, Mangalore- Sakleshpura- Hassan railway line is a single track route.There is a proposal for doubling the Mangalore–Hassan–Mysore line with electrification for reduction of time travelling between the coastal and plateau regions of Karnataka which will be a boon for the economy on this route. The Mangalore - Hassan railway line has been used for transporting fuels like Petrol,Diesel and LPG and also goods from New Mangalore Port located at Panambur,Dakshina Kannada revenue district of Karnataka state.
