= Barkur railway station =

Railway station in Karnataka, India

Barkur
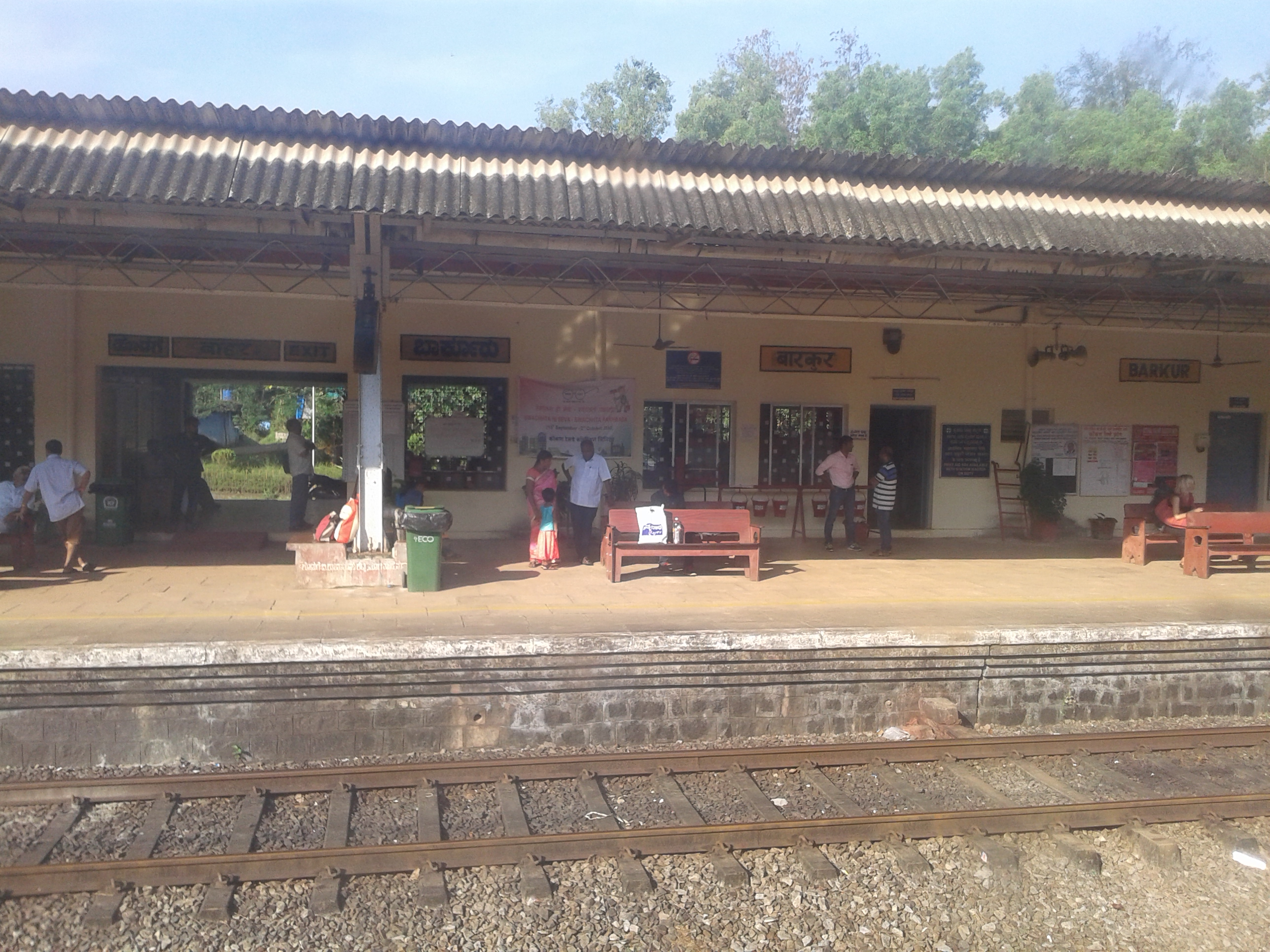

General information
- Coordinates: 13.4771°N 74.7599°E
- System: Indian Railways station
- Owner: Indian Railways
- Line: Konkan Railway
- Platforms: 1
- Tracks: 2

Construction
- Structure type: Standard on-ground
- Parking: Yes
- Cycle facilities: Yes

Other information
- Status: Active
- Station code: BKJ
- Fare zone: Konkan Railway

Services
| Preceding station | Indian Railways | Following station |
|---|---|---|
| Kundapura towards Roha | Konkan Railway Konkan Railway | Udupi towards Thokur |
Route map
Location
- Location within Karnataka Location within India

Barkur railway station is a station on Konkan Railway, its code is BKJ. Barkur railway (railroad) station is located in Udupi district of Karnataka state, India (Bharat) on Konkan Railway Corporation railway line. It serves to Brahmavar taluk and its surroundings. It is at a distance of 675.572 km (419.8 mi) down from origin. The preceding station on the line is Kundapura railway station and the next station is Udupi railway station. Barkur railway station is the nearest railway(railroad) station to Barkur (Barkoor) which was the capital of erstwhile Tulu kingdom (Tulunad).

The station has tea stall and toilet facility.Generally, Auto Rickshaws (three wheeler taxi's) are available outside the railway station to nearby places.

== Trains ==
1. Panchaganga Express
2. Matsyagandha Express(Train numbers 12619 / 12620)
3. SMVT Bengaluru–Murdeshwar Express
4. Murdeshwar–Kacheguda Superfast Express
5. Mangalore Central (MAQ) - Madgaon Junction (MAO) pasennger train (56616/56615) runs daily in both direction
6. Madgaon Junction (MAO) - Mangalore Central (MAQ) MAO-MAQ MEMU EXPRESS ( Train numbers 10107/10108) runs six days in a week except sunday.
