= Shrivagilu railway station =

Railway station in Dakshina Kannada district, India

Coordinates: 12.7992°N 75.5950°E

Shrivagilu railway station (Station code: SVGL) or Shribagilu railway station is a railway station in Dakshina Kannada district of Karnataka, India. Shiravagilu is on Mangalore–Hassan–Mysore line and comes under the jurisdiction of South Western Railway zone (SWR) zone. The preceding station while coming from Mangalore Junction (MAJN) is Subrahmanya Road railway station which is at distance of 12 kilometre. The next train station is Yedakumeri which is at approximately 18 kilometres from Shiravagilu.Shirabagilu train station is situated at an altitude od 282 metres above mean sea level (m.s.l). It is a railway station in the middle of Western Ghats forest. It is a crossing station with two railway tracks.
