= Donigal =

Village in Karnataka, India

Coordinates: 12°55′06″N 75°45′18″E

Donigal is a village in Hassan district of Karnataka state, India. Donigal village is nestled in the Western Ghats forests of India. The National Highway 75 connecting Mangaluru to Saleshapura passes through this village. There is a railway station at Donigal on Mangalore-Hassan-Mysore line.
