= Gomteshwara Express =

Express train in Karnataka, India

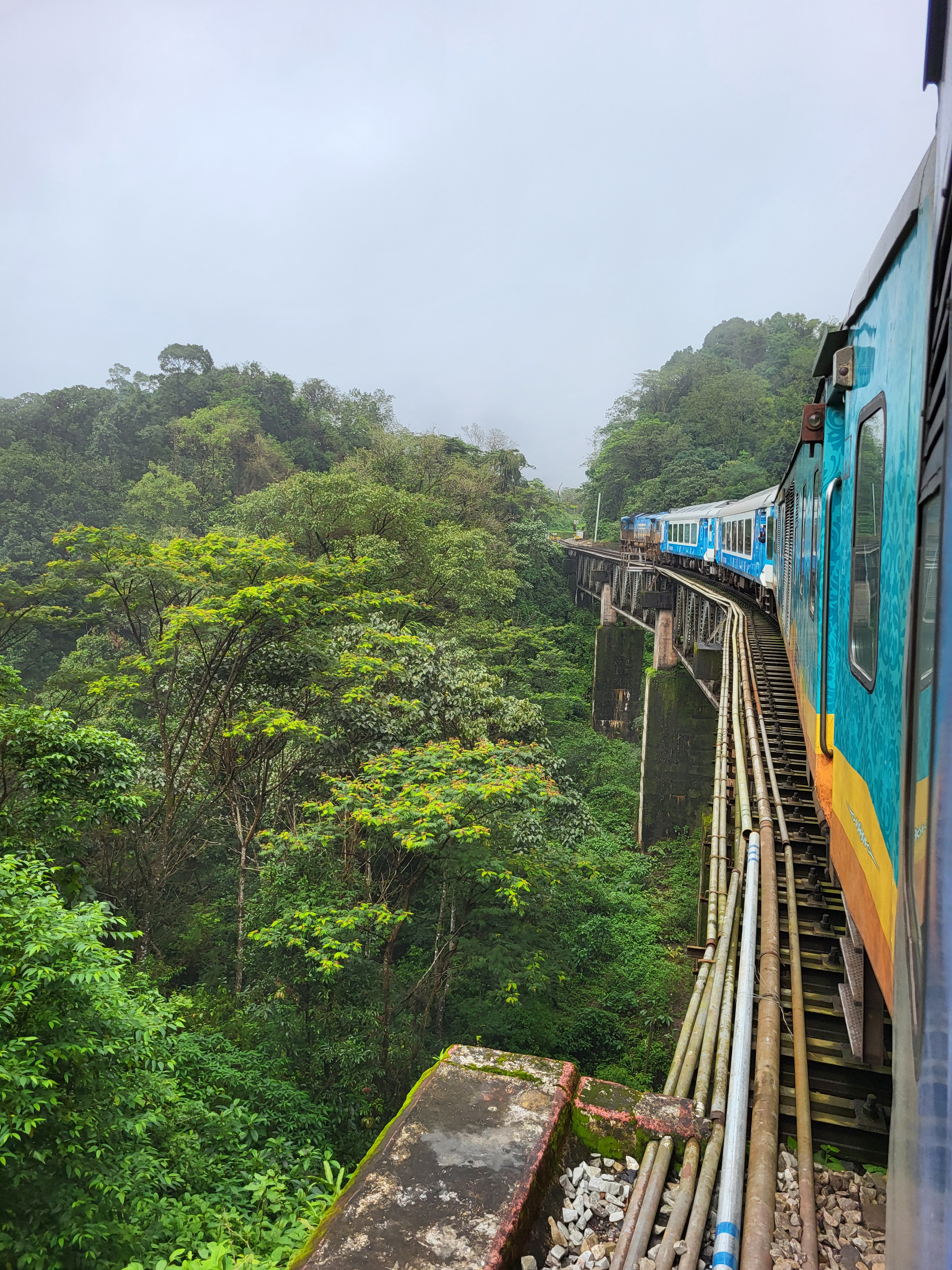

Overview
- Service type: Express
- First service: 9 April 2017
- Current operator: South Western Railways

Route
- Termini: Yesvantpur Junction; Mangalore Junction
- Stops: 12
- Distance travelled: 357 km (222 mi)
- Average journey time: 9 hours 23 mins
- Service frequency: Tri-Weekly
- Train number: 16575 / 16576

On-board services
- Classes: Vistadome, AC Chair Car, Second Seater
- Seating arrangements: Yes
- Sleeping arrangements: No
- Catering facilities: No Pantry Car Coach attached

Technical
- Rolling stock: LHB coach
- Track gauge: 1,676 mm (5 ft 6 in)
- Operating speed: 110 km/h (68 mph) maximum,39 km/h (24 mph), including halts

Gomteshwara Express is an Express train belonging to South Western Railway zone of Indian Railways that run between Yesvantpur Junction and Mangalore Junction in India. The name of the train is derived from the Gommateshwara statue which is a 57-foot (17 m) high monolithic statue located on Vindyagiri at Shravanbelagola in the Indian state of Karnataka. This train is also called "Kudla Express''

== Background ==
This train was inaugurated on 9 April 2017, From Mangaluru Junction flagged off by Suresh Prabhu (Former Minister of Railways) for Direct Connectivity between Mangalore and Bangalore via Shravanbelagola and the ghat section of Karnataka.

== Service ==
The frequency of this train is tri-weekly and it covers the distance of 357 km with an average speed of 39 km/h.

== Routes ==
This train passes through Chikkabanavara, Kunigal, Shravanabelagola, Hassan Junction, Sakleshpur, Kabaka Puttur and Bantwala on both sides.

== Traction ==
As the entire route is fully electrified, it is hauled by Diesel and Electric Loco Shed, Krishnarajapuram based WAP-7 on its entire journey.

== See also ==
Mangalore–Hassan–Mysore line
