= Sakleshpur railway station =

Railway station in Karnataka, India

Sakleshpur

General information
- Location: Railway Station Rd, Sakleshpur, Hassan district, Karnataka; India
- Coordinates: 12.9454°N 75.7791°E
- Elevation: 121 metres (397 ft)
- System: Indian Railways station
- Owner: Indian Railways
- Operator: South Western Railway
- Line: Mangalore–Hassan–Mysore line
- Platforms: 3

Construction
- Structure type: Standard (on ground station)

Other information
- Status: Functioning
- Station code: SKLR
- Zone(s): South Western Railway
- Division(s): Mysore
- Fare zone: South Western Railway

History
- Opened: 1979
- Closed: 1996 (for gauge conversion)
- Rebuilt: 2005

Services
Preceding station	Indian Railways	Following station
Donigal towards Mangalore Central	Mangalore–Hassan–Mysore line	Ballupete towards Mysore Junction
Route map
- Source: Google Maps, Kannur - KSR Bengaluru Express (via Mysuru)
Location
- Location within Karnataka Location within India

Sakleshpur railway station (Station Code:SKLR) is a railway station located in Hassan district, Karnataka state, India. It serves Sakleshpur town and nearby villages. Sakleshpura railway station is on Mangaluru to Hassan railway line. Sakleshpur railway station comes under jurisdiction Mysuru railway division of South Western Railway zone (SWR) of Indian Railways. The Sakleshpura railroad station lies on Mangalore–Hassan–Mysore line route. The gauge conversion from metre gauge to broad gauge railway track from Hassan to Mangalore was financed by Hassan Mangalore Railway Development Company (HMRDC) a joint venture of Karnataka state government and Indian railways.

At Sakleshpura rail station, locomotive engine bankers are attached or detached for trains carrying passengers or goods going towards or coming from Mangaluru (Kudla) city. Locomotive engines are detached for trains coming from Mangalooru and attached for trains going towards Mangaluru. This is done to climb or descent Western Ghats safely through 1:50 gradient.
