= Bajal =

- village
- Location in Karnataka, India
- Coordinates: 12.859°N 74.887°E
- Country: India
- State: Karnataka
- District: Dakshina Kannada

Population (2001)
  - Total: 9,960

Languages
  - Official: Kannada
- Time zone: UTC+5:30 (IST)

Bajal is a census town in Mangalore city, Dakshina Kannada district in the state of Karnataka, India. It is 2.7 kms from Praja soudha (New DC Office Padil).

== Demographics ==
As of 2001 India census, Bajal had a population of 9960. Males constitute 49% of the population and females 51%. Bajala has an average literacy rate of 76%, higher than the national average of 59.5%; with 52% of the males and 48% of females literate. 12% of the population is under 6 years of age.

== Institutions in Bajal ==
Edward & Cynthia Institute of Public Health

Mahadevi Bhajan Mandir

Holy Spirit Church

St Joseph High School

The Siraat School
