= Surathkal railway station =

Railway station in Karnataka, India

Surathkal
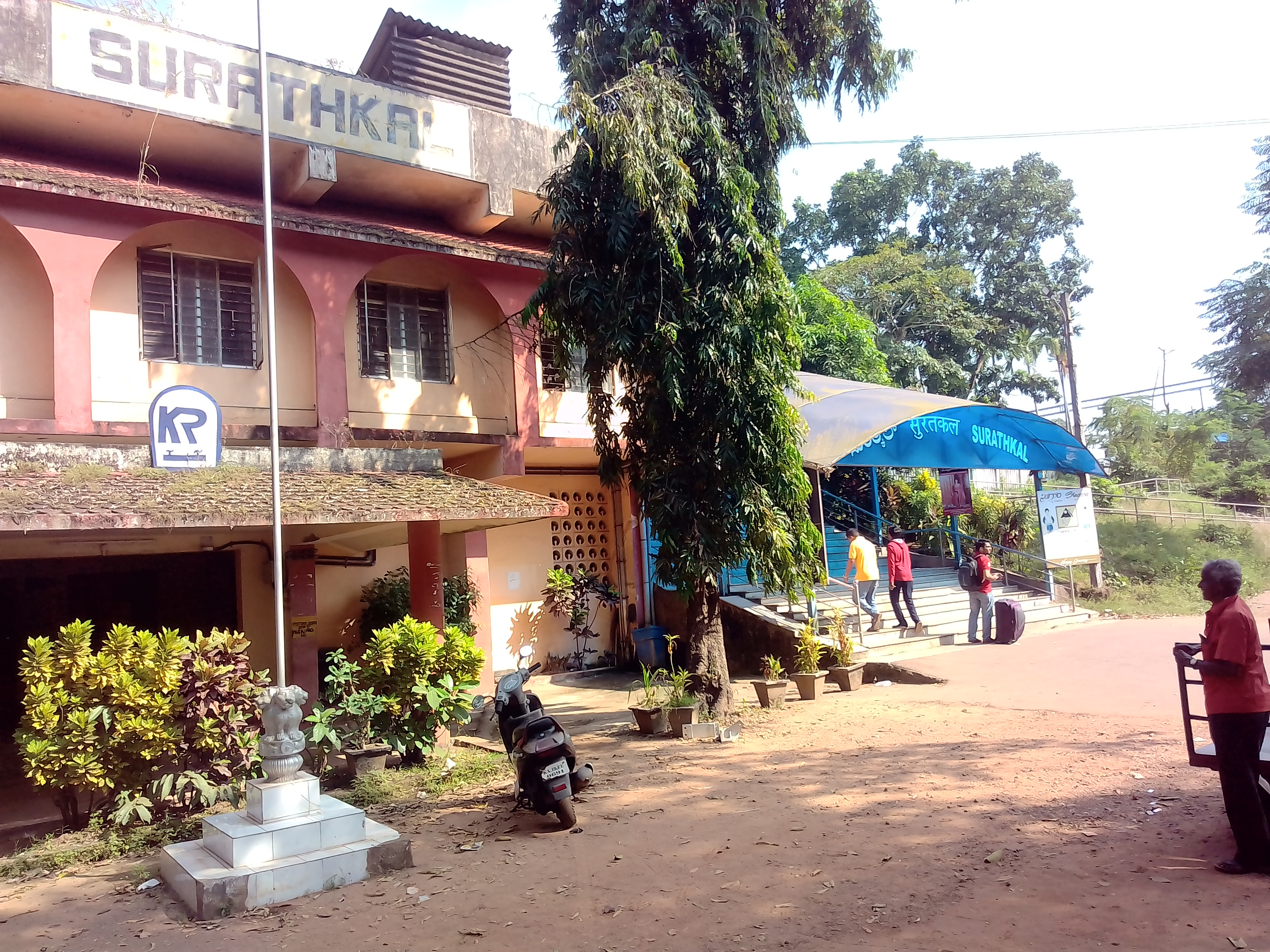
- View of entrance to Surathkal railway station

General information
- Location: Railway Station Road, Kadambodi, Tel: 0824-2475938, Surathkal, Karnataka; India
- Coordinates: 12.9902°N 74.8054°E
- System: Indian Railways station
- Owner: Indian Railways
- Operator: Konkan Railway
- Line: Konkan Railway
- Platforms: 1

Construction
- Structure type: Standard (on-ground station)

Other information
- Status: Functioning
- Station code: SL
- Zone(s): Konkan Railway
- Division(s): Karwar
- Fare zone: Indian Railways

History
- Opened: 1997; 29 years ago

Services
| Preceding station | Indian Railways | Following station |
|---|---|---|
| Mulki towards Roha | Konkan Railway Konkan Railway | Thokur Terminus |
Route map
Location
- Location within Karnataka

Surathkal railway station (Station code:SL) is one of the main railway stations of Mangalore city along with Mangalore Central railway station and Mangalore Junction railway station and is located in north Mangaluru on Konkan Railway route. Twenty-two trains stop here.KRCL operates RO-RO services from Suratkal to Verna, Kolad, and Karembeli. As per the Konkan railway map, Surathkal railway station is at a distance of 733.825 kilometers from the northern starting point of the Konkan railway line at Roha and 4.615 kilometers from Thokur which is the southern endpoint of Konkan railway jurisdiction. The Surathkal railway station is at distance of 26.285 Kilometre from Mangaluru Central(MAQ) railway station.

The station has only one platform and a single diesel broad gauge track. The electrification of Konkan railway tracks was completed in March 2022 During the landslides that occurred in August 2019 at Padil-Kulashekar railway section in Mangaluru, several trains were terminated at Surathkal railway stations. Again from 6-2-2023 to 3-3-2023 due to works carried between Padil and Jokatte section many trains were short terminated at Suratkal railway station, the trains were 12133/12134 CSMT- Manguluru Junction Express and Madgaon- Mangaluru Central Express (10107/10108). There is an urgent need of constructing another platform at Surathkal railway station to handle such emergencies as well as increasing number of passengers.

Konkan Railway Corporation Limited offers RO-RO services for loaded lorries (trucks) starting from Surathkal train station to Kolad and Kalembeli. Rolling IN and Rolling OUT of RORO rakes are carried here. The Surathkal railway station has a Passenger Reservation System (PRS) counter, tea stall, ethnic food stall, waiting room and toilet for men and women at the platform.There is running room for the crew of Konkan Railways.

== Background ==
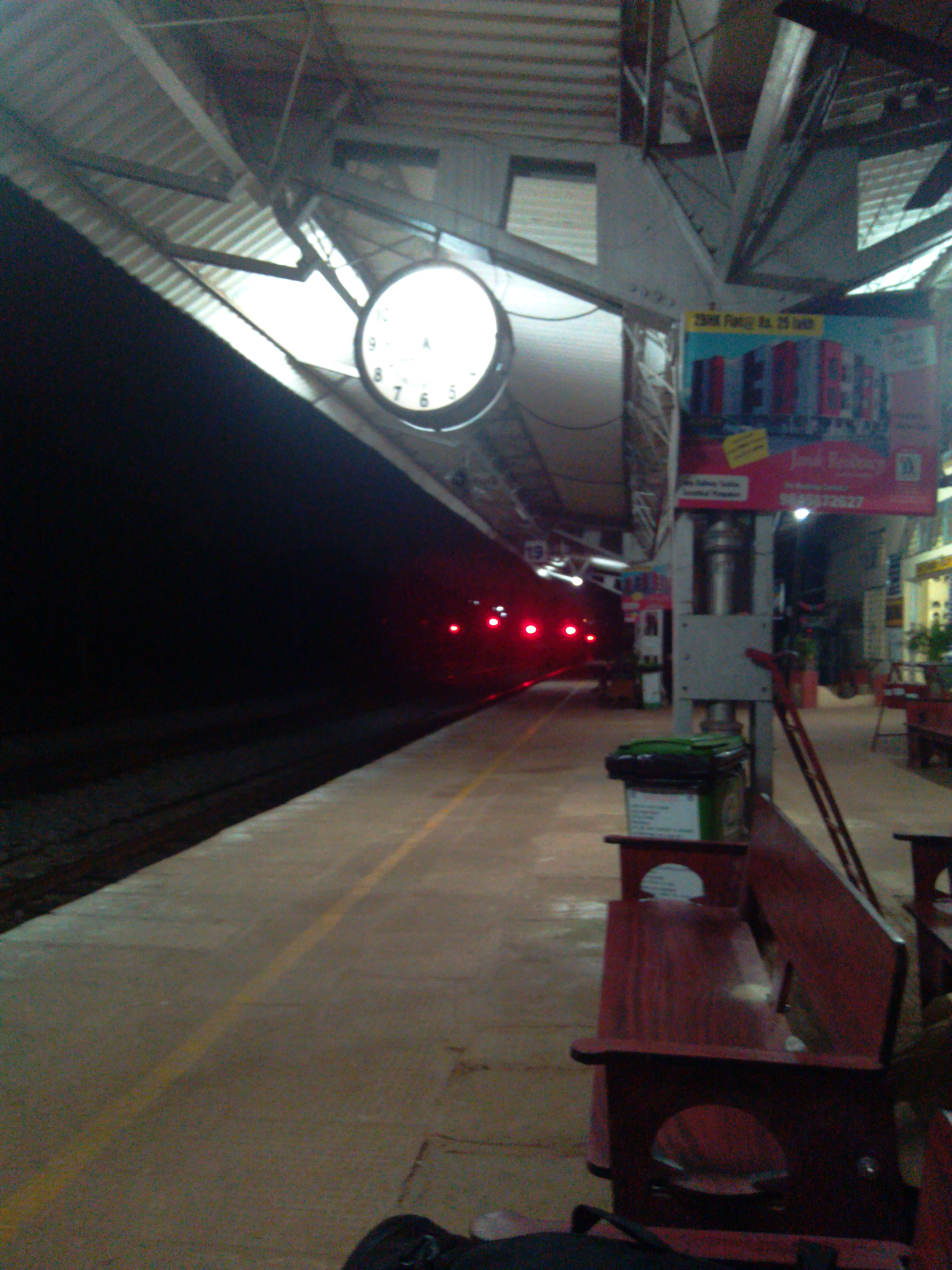
Surathkal railway station at night

Surathkal is a suburb of Mangalore city located on National Highway 66 (earlier known as National Highway 17) in the Dakshina Kannada district, Karnataka state, India on the shore of the Arabian Sea. It is a municipality merged with Mangalore City Corporation. It lies between the Gurupura (Phalguni) and Pavanje (Nandini) rivers. It is considered as the northernmost area of Mangalore City Corporation geographical limits. Surathkal is six kilometers north of New Mangalore sea port (NMPT). The nearest airport is Mangalore International Airport (IXE/VOML) at fifteen kilometers away from Surathkal railway station. Mangalore petroleum refinery (MRPL) is three kilometers from this railway station. National Institute of Technology, Karnataka (formerly KREC) is at distance of two kilometers from Suratkal railway station.

== Location ==
The Surathkal railway station is located 13.2 meters above mean sea level. The Surathkal railway station is just 500 meters east of national highway NH-66.The entrance to the railway station is from Surathkal-Bajpe Road now known as Surathkal-MRPL road. There is a bus-stop at the entrance of the railway station road where one can get city buses to Hampankatta, Panambur, Kulai, Kulur, Mangalore, Kankanady, Krishnapura (3 kilometre from station), Katipalla, and Bajpe. Auto rickshaws are available for travel to nearby locations.

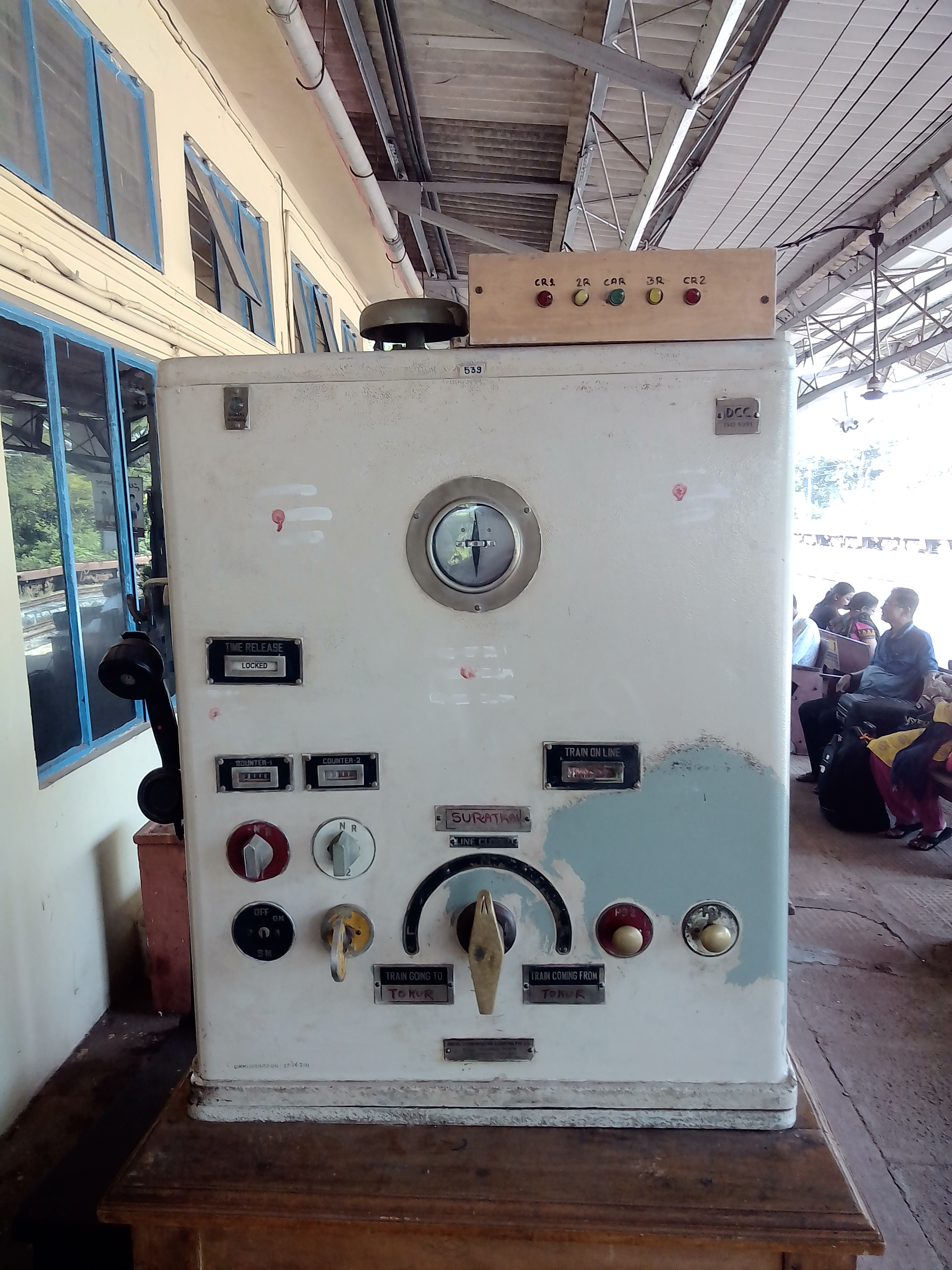
Discarded manual signal system at Suratkal railway station

== Trains ==
The following trains have a stop at Surathkal railway station in both directions:

- Matsyagandha Express Train numbers (12619/12620) runs daily.
- Netravati Express (16346/16345) runs daily.
- Mumbai CSMT–Mangaluru Junction Superfast Express Train no. (12133 / 12134) runs daily.
- MRDW (Murudeshwara)-SMVB (Bengaluru) Express (16585/16586) runs daily.
- Bengaluru(SBC) - Karwar(KAWR) Panchaganga Express (16595/16596) runs daily.
- Gandhidham junction-Nagaracoil junction Express (16335/16336) once in a week.
- Okha-Eranakulam Junction Express (16337/16338) twice in a week.
- Madgaon–Mangalore Intercity Express (22635/22636)
- Mangaluru–Madgaon Special Passenger (06601/06602) runs daily.
- Mangaluru–Madgaon MEMU (10107/10108 every day except Sunday.
- Yeshvantpur–Karwar Express (16515/16516) thrice in a week.
- Murdeshvara (MRDW) - Kacheguda (Hyderabad) (12789/12790) twice a week.
- Surat - Mangaluru (19057/19058) Bi-weekly train w.e.f.3 June 2026.
- Mangaluru - Ahmedabad (09423/09424) Special train upto 30 May 2026 (Weekly)

Some special trains running through Konkan railway route have stop at Surathkal railroad station.

Western Railway zone and Konkan Railway Corporation have announced that Ganapati festival special (fully reserved) trains will be run from Mumbai Central(MMCT) to Surathkal(SL) and vice versa. The train number 09183 will leave Mumbai Central at 11.55p.m on 8 September 2021 and 15 September 2021 and reach Surathkal at 8p.m next day. Train 09184 will start from Suratkal at 9.15 p.m on 9 September 2021 and 16 September 2021 and reach Mumbai central at 8.55p.m next day. The coach composition of 09183 and 09184 will be Two coaches of 2 tier Air conditioned, Eight coaches of 3 tier A.C, Two sleeper coaches along with one pantry car and two generator coaches. These will be the first train to officially terminate and originate at Surathkal railway station.

Winter Special train ( 01453/01454) running from LTT(Mumbai) terminates at Surathkal from 31 January 2023. On 8 November 2025 Mumbai CSMT to Mangaluru Junction (Train number 12133) was short terminated at Surathkal railwat station for carrying of doubling between Jokkate and Thokur and same train (12134) started its journey from Surathkal train station to Mumbai CSMT.
