= Karwar railway station =

Railway station in Karnataka, India

Karwar

General information
- Location: State Highway 6, Shirwad, Karwar, Karnataka; India
- Coordinates: 14.8201°N 74.1826°E
- Elevation: 11 metres (36 ft)
- System: Indian Railways station
- Owner: Indian Railways
- Operator: Karwar railway division
- Platforms: 2
- Tracks: 3
- Connections: Auto stand and Local bus

Construction
- Structure type: Standard (on-ground station)
- Parking: Yes
- Cycle facilities: NO

Other information
- Status: Functioning
- Station code: KAWR
- Zone(s): Konkan Railway zone
- Division(s): Karwar

History
- Opened: 1994

Services
Preceding station	Indian Railways	Following station
Asnoti towards Roha	Konkan Railway	Harwada towards Thokur
Route map
Location

Karwar railway station is one of the main railway station in Uttara Kannada, Karnataka. Its code is KAWR. It is the headquarters of the Karwar Division of Konkan Railway (Pernem–Thokur). It serves Karwar city. The station consists of two platforms. Karwar has three nearby railway stations: Karwar, Asnoti and Harwada. A 1.69 km (1.05 mi) railway bridge on Kali River falls before Karwar Railway Station while travelling from the side of Goa. The town of Karwar is situated beside Kali River.

Karwar is connected by Konkan Railway which connects Delhi, Bengaluru, Mumbai, Ajmer, Jaipur, Mysuru, Rajkot, Ernakulam, Indore, Bhopal, Thiruvananthapuram, Coimbatore, Jaipur, Ratlam, Madurai and Thane. Hubli–Ankola railway line is proposed to link Karwar Port and the northern Karnataka as well as Honnavar–Talaguppa railway line.

However, the Save Konkan Ecology Forum (SKEF) is strictly & violently opposing Hubli–Ankola railway line & Honnavar–Talaguppa railway line projects, citing concerns regarding destruction & disruption of ecology, environment, forest, animals, flora & fauna of Ankola Forest & Talguppa Forest regions. Karwar is just 60.84 km (37.80 mi) away from Madgaon in Goa.
