= Mangalore Junction railway station =

Railway station in Karnataka India

Mangalore Junction Mangaluru Junction
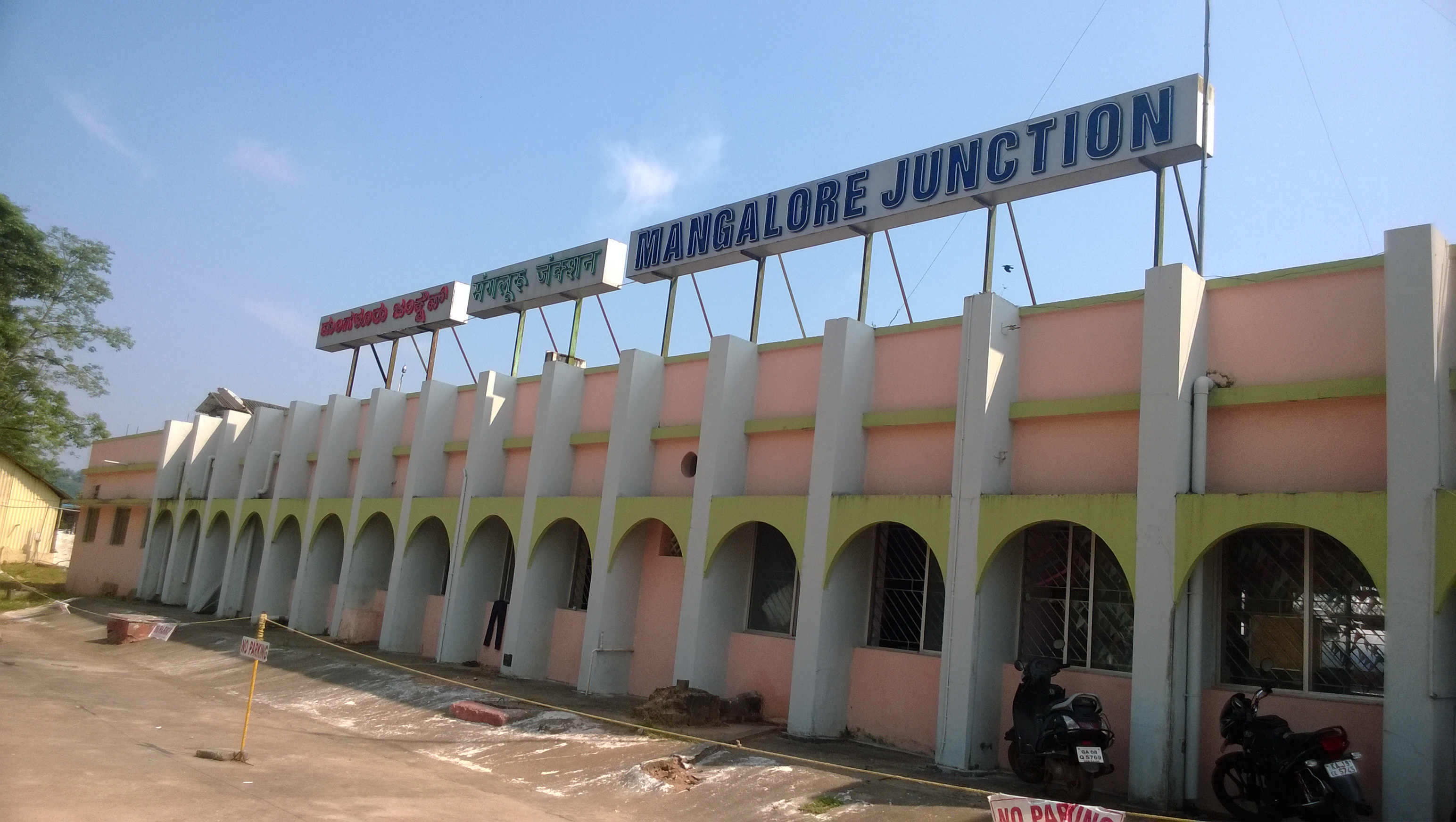
- Mangalore junction in 2014

General information
- Other names: Kudla Junction
- Location: Darbar Hill, Padil, Mangalore, 575007, Karnataka; India
- Coordinates: 12.87°N 74.87°E
- Elevation: 24 m (79 ft)
- System: Indian Railways station
- Owner: Indian Railways
- Operator: South Western Railway zone
- Line: Shoranur–Mangalore section Mangalore Junction-Mangalore Central Mangalore–Hassan–Mysore line
- Platforms: 3
- Tracks: 7

Construction
- Structure type: At Grade
- Parking: Available
- Accessible: Disabled access

Other information
- Status: Operational
- Station code: MAJN
- Zone(s): SWR
- Division(s): Mysore

History
- Opened: 1915( 115 Years ago)
- Closed: 2022
- Rebuilt: 2025
- Former names: Kankanady Junction

Passengers
- 10,0000: 1,50,00 ▲190%

Services
Preceding station	Indian Railways	Following station
Thokur towards ?	South Western Railway zone Shoranur–Mangalore west	Nethravathi towards Shoranur Junction
Padil towards ?	South Western Railway zone Shoranur–Mangalore west	Mangalore Central Terminus
Padil towards Mysore Junction	Mangalore–Hassan–Mysore line	Mangalore Central Terminus
Route map
- Sources
Location
- Location within Karnataka

Mangalore Junction railway station (formerly Kankanadi railway station(station code: MAJN) is an NSG–3 category Indian railway station in Mysuru Railway Division of South Western Railway zone. It is an important railway station connecting Konkan, Western Ghat (Mangalore Hassan Mysore line) and Malabar railways and is also the gateway to the port city of Mangalore located at Darbar Hill, Padil, Mangalore, 575007. The station is a junction interconnecting Mangalore Central railway station with Kerala in the south, Maharashtra/Goa and Mangalore Sea Port in the north and Bangalore–Chennai in the east. It is the busiest railway junction in the area, as all north- and southbound trains touch Mangalore through this station.

It was formerly called Kankanadi railway station when the city railway station was simply called Mangalore railway station. Later both were renamed as Mangalore Junction and Mangalore Central respectively to avoid confusion.

The railways wish to develop Mangalore Junction to a world-class station on the 60 acres of land, owned by the railways, that adjoins the station.

== Service ==
The railway station has the daily connectivity to important cities of India like – Mumbai,Thane, Kochi, New Delhi, Jaipur, Ahmedabad, Bangalore, Chennai, Thiruvananthapuram .

Thiruvananthapuram Rajdhani Express connect with Hazrat Nizamuddin railway station in New Delhi along with other trains like Mangala Lakshadweep Express, Kerala Sampark Kranti Express.

Other trains include Tirunelveli–Gandhidham Humsafar Express, Marusagar Express, Kochuveli-Shri Ganganagar Junction Express, Jabalpur-Coimbatore Superfast Express, Kochuveli–Lokmanya Tilak Terminus Garib Rath Express, Netravati Express.

The following trains originate/terminate at Mangalore Junction Railway station (Kankanadi).

- Mangalore Junction(MAJN) - Yeshvantpura (Bengaluru) express (16540/16541)
- Mangalore Junction(MAJN) - Yeshwantpura (Bengaluru) Gomteshwara Express (16575/16576)
- Mangalore Junction(MAJN) - Tirunelveli express (16575/16576)
- Mangalore Junction (MAJN) - CSMT (Mumbai) Superfast express (12133/12134) runs daily.
- Mangaluru Junction(MAJN) - (THIRUVANANTHAPURAM NORTH (Kochuveli) (16314/16313)
- Mangaluru Junction(MAJN) - (THIRUVANANTHAPURAM NORTH (Kochuveli) Antyodaya express(16355/16356)
- Mangaluru Junction(MAJN) - Surat, Bi-weekly express train on Monday and Thursday (19057 / 19558) via Konkan Railway Corporation route.
- Mangaluru Junction(MAJN) - Ahmedabad, special express train (09423/09424) via Konkan railway route.

== Location ==
The nearest major transport hubs:

- Nearest airport: Mangalore International Airport (11 km)
- Nearest sea port: New Mangalore Port (14 km)
- Nearest bus stations Hampankatta (6 km) and Lalbagh, Mangalore (8 km)
- Nearest bus stops:Naguri (200 mtrs), Padil (500 mtrs), Bajal Cross (100 mtrs)
- Distance from Mangalore Central railway station is 6 km

== See also ==
- Mangalore Central railway station
- Thokur railway station
- Surathkal railway station
- Jokatte railway station
- Bangalore railway station
