= Kabaka Puttur =

Kabaka Puttur Kabaka
- Taluk
- Location in Karnataka, India Kabaka Puttur (India)
- Coordinates: 12.786°N 75.156°E
- Country: India
- State: Karnataka
- District: Dakshina Kannada

Government
  - Body: Taluk panchayat

Population (2011)
  - Total: 4,532

Languages
  - Official: Kannada
- Time zone: UTC+5:30 (IST)
- PIN: 574 220
- Telephone code: 08251
- ISO 3166 code: IN-KA
- Vehicle registration: KA-21
- Website: karnataka.gov.in

Kabaka is a village in the Puttur Taluk of Dakshina Kannada district, in Karnataka, India. It is near to town of Puttur. Historical Hill NinniKallu is situated near Kabaka but the hill belongs to Bantwala Taluk. Also, the Kabaka-Puttur is a railway station on the Mangalore-Hassan Railway line.
