= Kundapura railway station =

Railway station in Karnataka, India

Kundapura
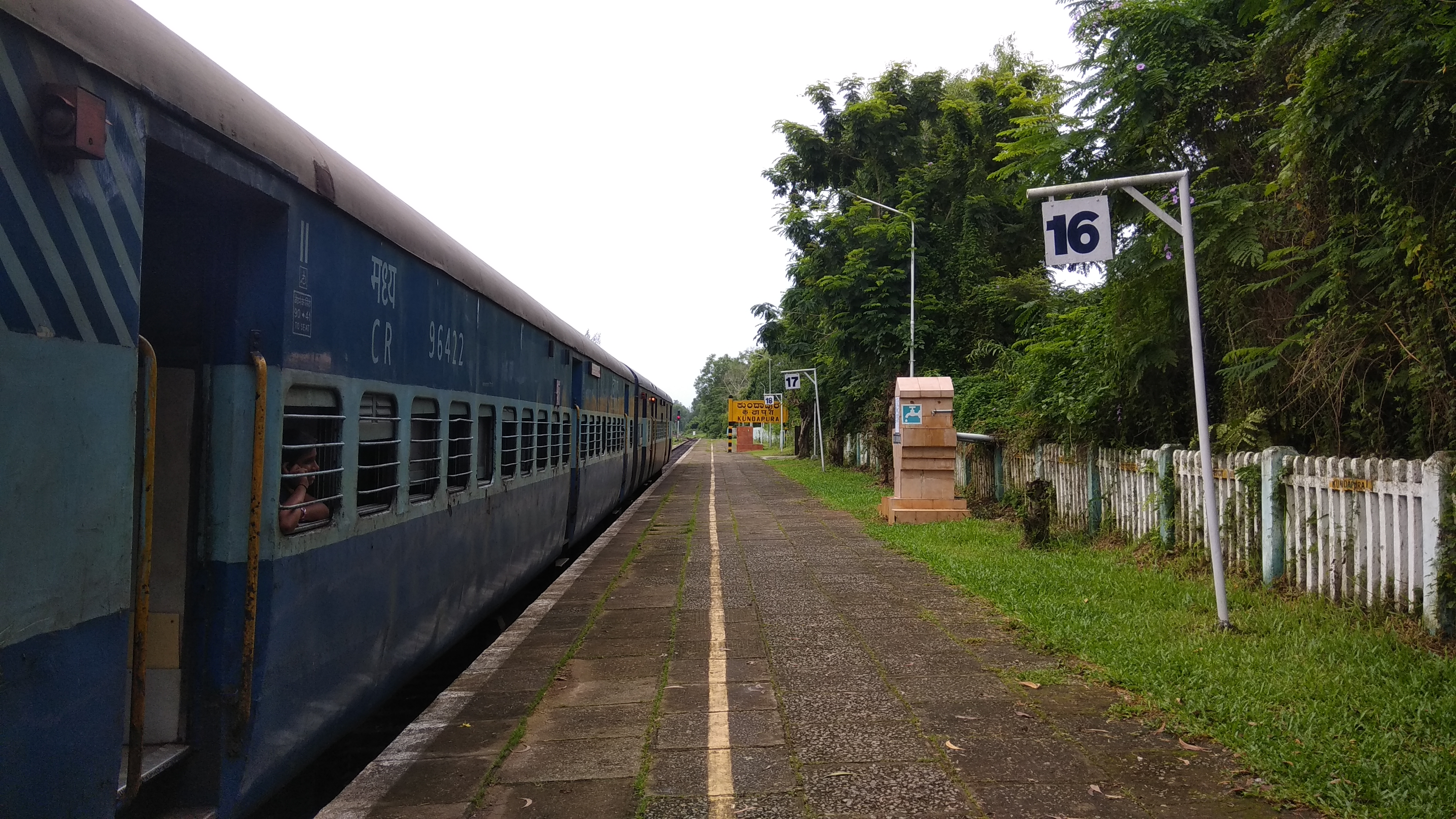

General information
- Coordinates: 13.6133°N 74.7287°E
- System: Indian Railways station
- Owner: Indian Railways
- Line: Konkan Railway
- Platforms: 2
- Tracks: 2

Other information
- Status: Active
- Station code: KUDA

Services
Preceding station	Indian Railways	Following station
Senapura towards Roha	Konkan Railway Konkan Railway	Barkur towards Thokur
Route map
Location
- Location within Karnataka

Kundapura railway station is a station on Konkan Railway Which connects the Kundapur City to other cities of the country like New Delhi, Mumbai, Bengaluru, Mysore, Chennai, Trivandrum, Cochin etc. This station connects between two city Udupi and Bhatkal. It's pilgrim important railway station connects Kollur Mookambika Temple and Aanegudde Vinayaka temple . It's very much used by Kerala pilgrims as this station makes pilgrim reach Kollur faster than any other stations. It is at a distance of 660.000 km (410.1 mi) down from origin. The preceding station on the line is Senapura railway station and the next station is Barkur railway station.
