= Hassan Junction railway station =

Railway station in Karnataka

Hassan Junction

General information
- Location: BM Road, Hassan, Karnataka; India
- Elevation: 951 metres (3,120 ft)
- System: Indian Railways station
- Owner: Indian Railways
- Operator: South Western Railway
- Line: Mysore-Hassan-Mangalore line Hassan-Bangalore section Hassan-Arsikere Line
- Platforms: 3
- Tracks: 7

Construction
- Structure type: Standard (on ground station)
- Parking: Yes
- Cycle facilities: No

Other information
- Status: Functioning
- Station code: HAS
- Zone(s): South Western Railway
- Division(s): Mysore
Location

Hassan Junction railway station, also known as Hassana Junction railway station (station code: HAS). It is the main railway station in Hassan district, Karnataka. It serves Hassan city. The station consists of three platforms.

== Connectivity ==
Many trains travel through this station on a daily basis. This junction connects Hassan to major cities like Bengaluru, Mysuru, Kalaburagi, Raichur, Mangalore, Hubli-Dharwad, Shivamogga, Solapur, Karwar, Kannur, Mumbai and Delhi.
