= Mysore Junction railway station =

Railway station in Mysore, India

Mysore Junction
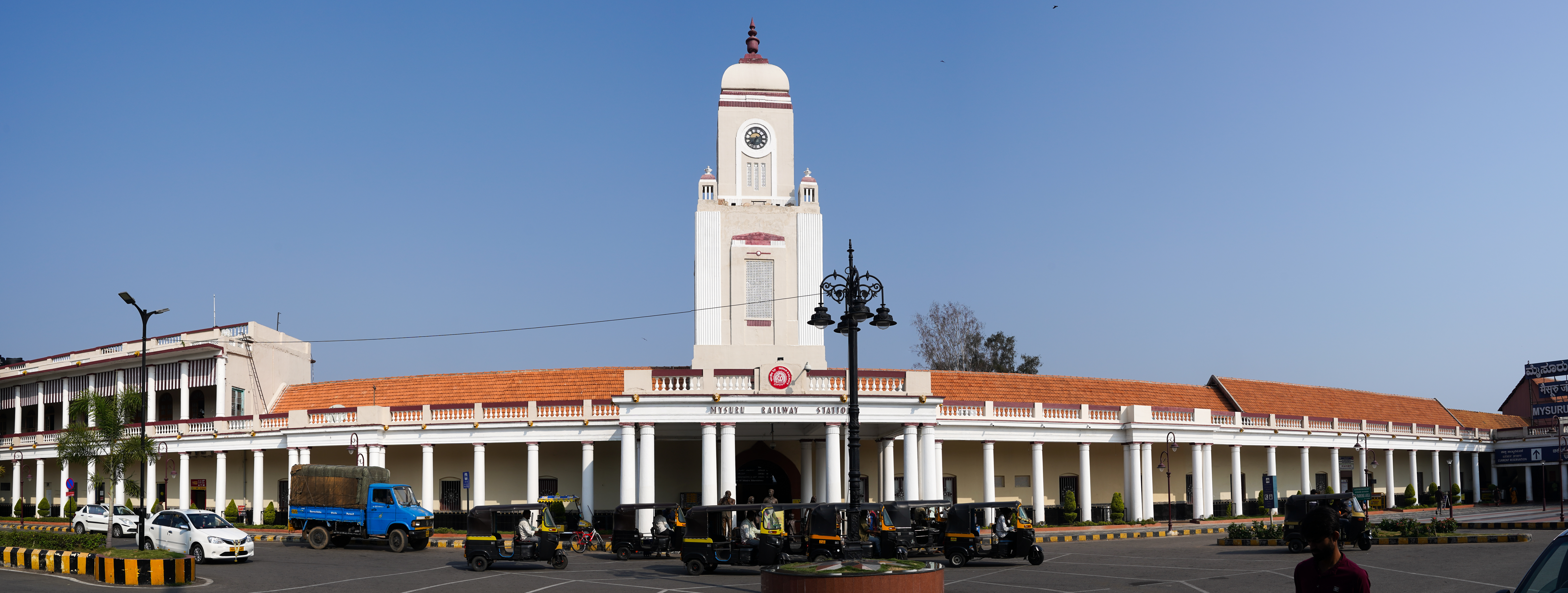
- Clock tower, Railway station

General information
- Location: Medar block, Yadavagiri, Mysore, Mysore district, Karnataka; India
- Coordinates: 12.3163°N 76.6454°E
- Elevation: 760 m (2,490 ft)
- System: Indian Railways station
- Owner: Indian Railways
- Operator: South Western Railway zone
- Lines: Mysore – Bangalore main line Mysore – Chamarajanagara branch line Mysore – Hassan main line
- Platforms: 6
- Tracks: 14

Construction
- Structure type: Standard (on-ground station)
- Parking: Yes

Other information
- Status: Functioning
- Station code: MYS
- Zone(s): South Western Railway zone
- Division(s): Mysore

History
- Opened: 1870; 156 years ago

Passengers
- 60,000/day
Location
- Location within India
- Interactive map

Mysore Junction railway station, re-christened as Mysuru Junction railway station (station code: MYS) is a railway station on Mysore–Bangalore railway line serving the city of Mysore, Karnataka, India. Previously Mysore was connected to Bangalore by a single-line metre-gauge track. It was later converted into non-electrified broad-gauge line. It has now been converted to a double-line, electrified route.

== History ==
The heritage Mysore Railway Station building was constructed in the late 1940s. Currently, it has 6 platforms. All are connected by barrier-free access via lifts, subway and 2 escalators. On the right side of the building, are counters for unreserved ticketing and advance booking. There are also automatic ticket vending machines. The Mysore Railway Division and the Mysore Railway station have a reputation for cleanliness. According to Railways authorities, it is the cleanest of the 3 division of the South Western Railways. As part of the beautification, in 2019 a sculpture "Life is a Journey" by local artist Arun Yogiraj was installed in the entrance to the building. The sculpture consists of 6 statues representing travelers in typical postures.

=== Platform Layout ===
G	West Entrance Street level	Exit/Entrance & ticket counter
P	Loop Line	All Diesel / Electric Loco Engines are halted here
P	FOB, Side platform | P6 Doors will open on the left * Platform 6 is dedicated for Shatabdi Express train as well as Outstation Express trains towards KSR Bengaluru City Jn
P	Platform 6 *	Towards → KSR Bengaluru / MGR Chennai Ctrl; Next Station: KSR Bengaluru
P	Platform 5	Towards → Hassan Junction / KSR Bengaluru
P	FOB, Island platform | P4 Doors will open on the left | P5 Doors will open on the right
P	Platform 4	Towards → Hassan Junction / KSR Bengaluru
P	Platform 3	Towards → Hassan Junction / KSR Bengaluru
P	FOB, Island platform | P2 Doors will open on the left | P3 Doors will open on the right
P	Platform 2	Towards → KSR Bengaluru
P	Platform 1 *	Towards → KSR Bengaluru / MGR Chennai Ctrl; Next Station: Mandya / KSR Bengaluru
P	FOB, Side platform | P1 Doors will open on the right * Platform 1 is dedicated for Vande Bharat Express trains as well as Outstation Express trains towards KSR Bengaluru City Jn
G	East Entrance Street level	Exit/Entrance & ticket counter

== Railway museum ==
Close to the railway station is a museum which has exhibits of vintage locomotives. It was established in 1979 by the Indian Railways, and is the second such museum after the one in Delhi. One of the exhibits is the Maharani Saloon Carriage, with a kitchen and royal toilet, dating back to 1899, belonging to the Royal family of Mysore. Wooden doors and pillars of the old Srirangapatna railway station are also on display. Other exhibits include a 1925 Austin rail motor car, 1900-built WG Bagnall 1625, a Surrey Iron Railway (SIR) Class E 37244 4-4-4T locomotive built in 1920 by the North British Locomotive Co, a Southern Railway Class TS/1 37338 2-6-2T built by WG Bagnall for the Mysore Railways in 1932.

== Lines ==
- Mysore–Chamarajanagar branch line
- Mysore–Bangalore railway line
- Mysore–Hassan railway line This is a railway line which connects Mysuru Junction with Arsikere Junction via Krishnarajasagara railway station and Hassan Junction

== Gallery ==
Some of this railway station pictures are shown below:-

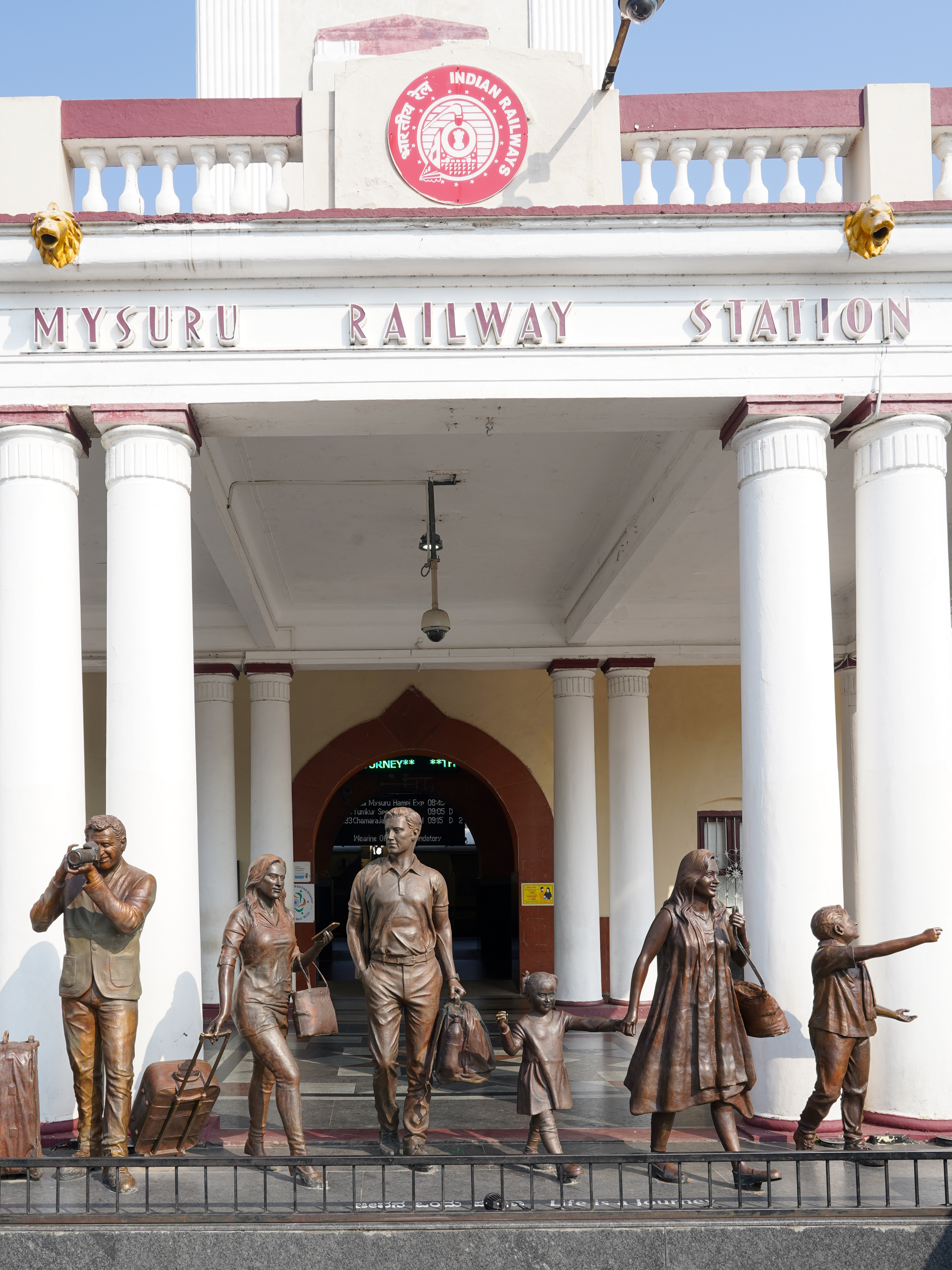
Statues Front View Mysore Railway Station

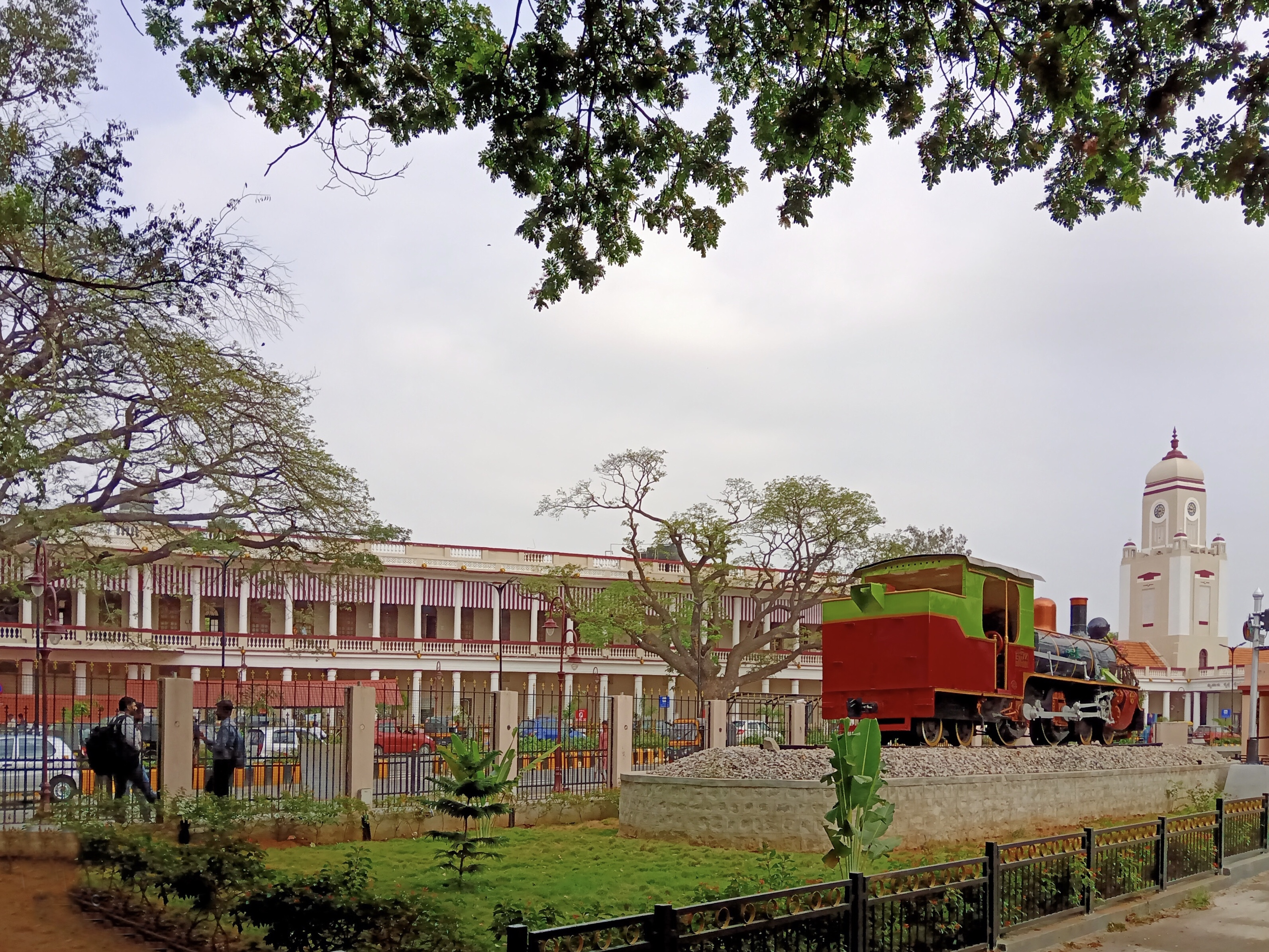
Station Building

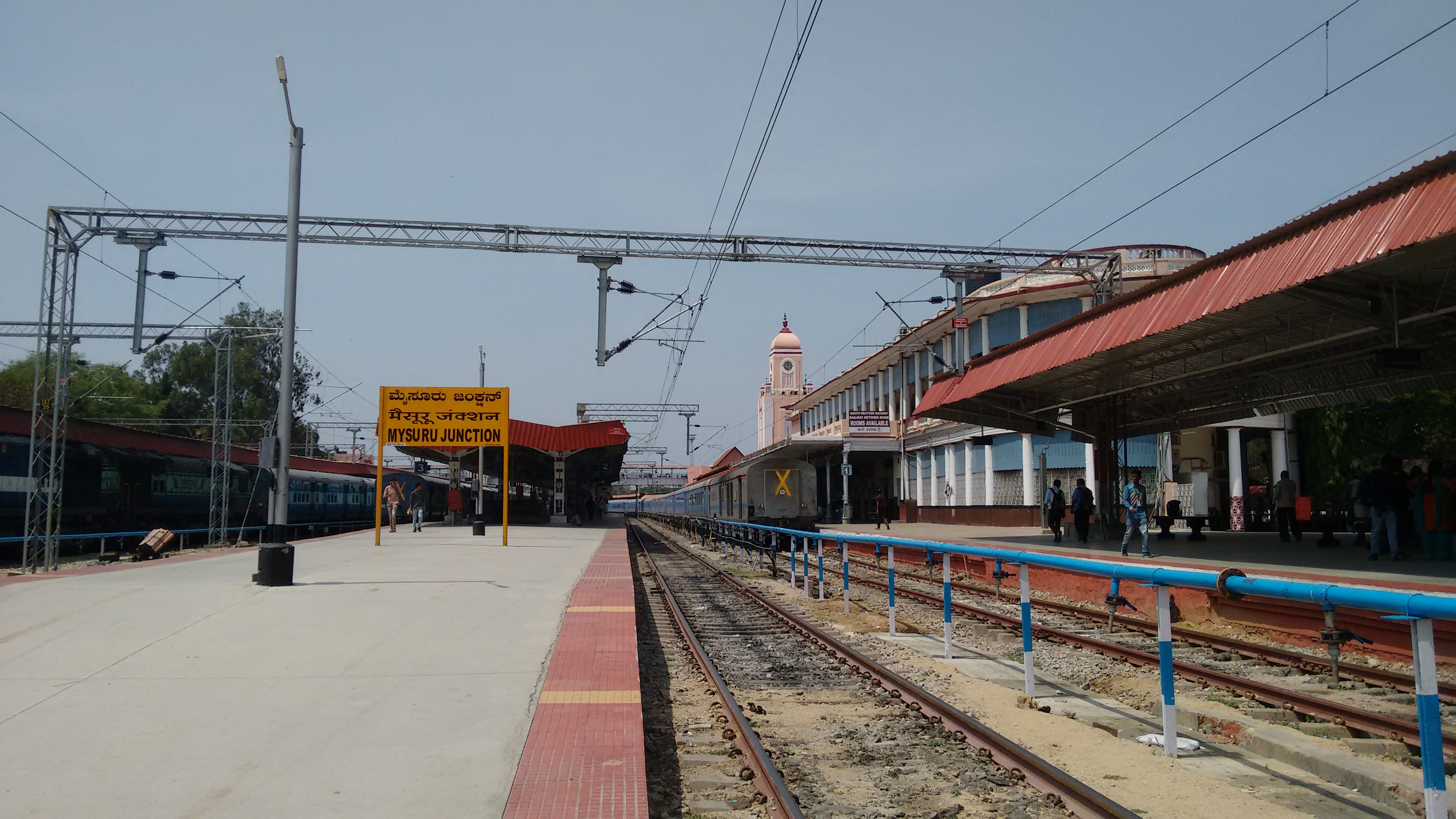
Platform 2

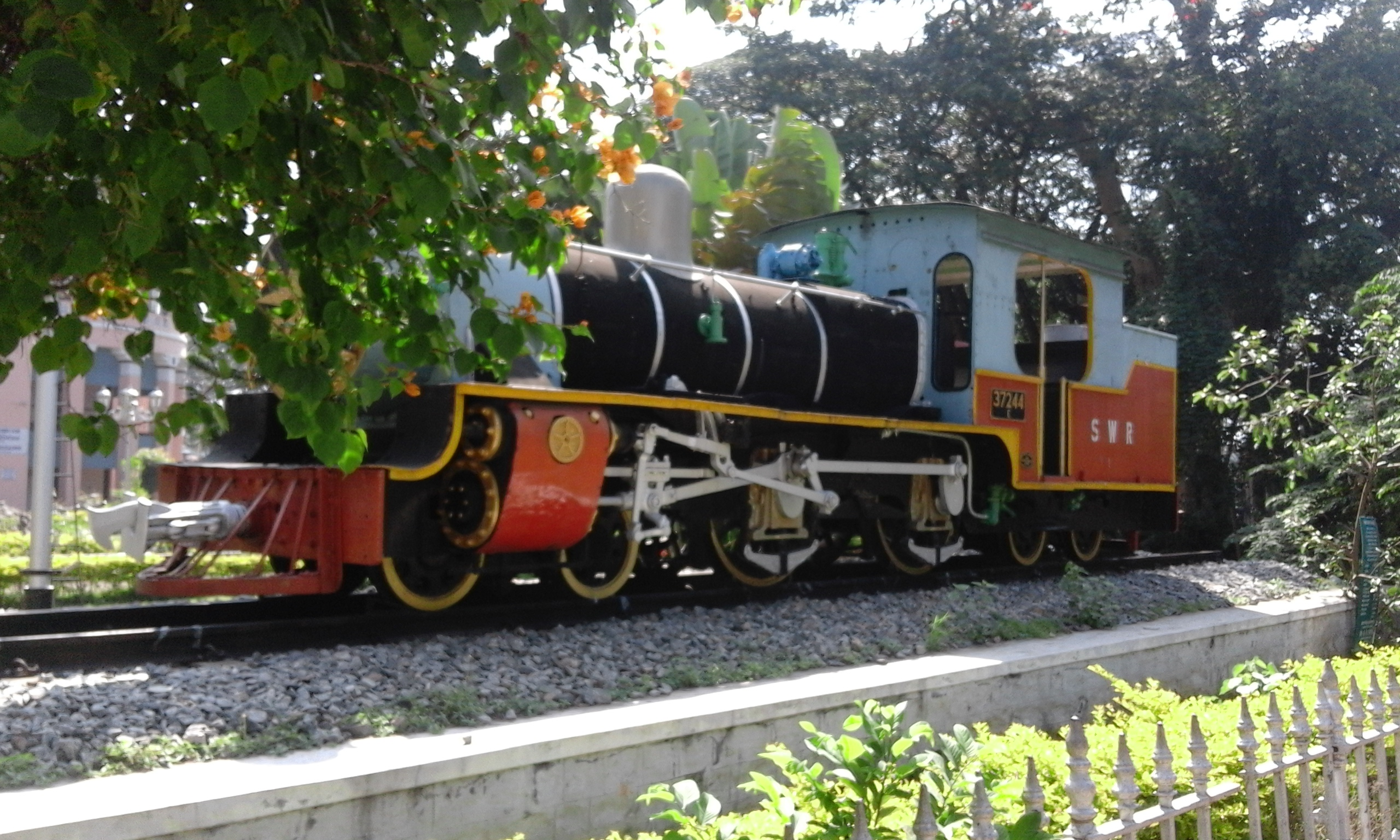
Model conventional Steam Locomotive
