= List of Hindu temples in Tulu Nadu =

This is a list of Hindu ( Sanatana ) temples in Tulu Nadu, a region in the southern Indian state of Karnataka, comprising present day Dakshina Kannada, Udupi district of Karnataka state and Kasargod district of Kerala state . Tulu Nadu is famous for numerous temples dedicated to Ganapati, Subrahmanya, Vishnu, Shiva, Durga, Lakshmi, Guru and hundreds of temples of other deities.

Deity	Temple Name	Location
Ganesh	Swastika Ganapathi/Vinayaka Temple	Southadka, Kokkada Sharavu, Kodialbail Ganeshpura, Katipalla: Yudettu, Matyadi; Uppoor, Udupi; Nadsal, Someshwara Anegudde, Kumbhashi Hattiangadi, Kundapura Madhur siddhivinayaka kasargodu Idagunji, Honnavara
Subrahmanya	Swastika Subrahmanya/Subraya Temple	Kukke, Kukke Subrahmanya Katukukke, Perla Kadandale, Moodabidre Thokur, Haleangadi Guddemmadi, Senapura
Vishnu	Swastika Vishnu murthi temple	Kulai, Mangalore Arur, Udupi: Kavur, Sullia; Punarur, Talipady Panambur, Thokur
Vishnu	Swastika Anantha Padmanabha Temple	Kudupu, Vamanjoor Perdoor, Udupi Ananthapura, Kumble
Vishnu	Swastika Narayana Temple	Anjar, Udupi
Vishnu	Swastika Venkataramana Temple	Carstreet, Mangalore Tirumala, Bantwala Paner, Bantwala Carstreet, Puttur Laila, Belthangadi Karnad, Mulky Carstreet, Kasaragod
Shiva/Vishnu	Swastika Shankarnarayana Temple	Nandavara, Melkar Shankaranarayana, Haladi Koliyoor, Udupi
Shiva	Swastika Mahalingeshwara Temple	Carstreet, Puttur: Pandeshwar, Mangalore; Kavoor, Mangalore; Carstreet, Bantwala; Iddya, Surathkal; Ponnagiri, Soorinje; Pavanje, Haleangadi, Adooru; mulleria*Ajapila, Bellare: Padubidre, Kaup; Uchila, Kaup; Bannanje, Udupi; Kalavara, Kundapura; Kumbhashi, Kundapura; Miyar, Karkala; Pervaje, Karkala
Shiva	Swastika Somanatheshwara Temple	Puthige, Moodabidre, Someshwara, Ullal Kuthyar, Belthangadi Kurnad, Mudipu
Shiva	Swastika Sadashiva Temple	Surathkal, Mangalore, Narahari Parvata, Amtoor: Nitilapura, Golthamajal; Ambar, Mangalapadi
Shiva	Swastika Panchalingeshwara Temple	Kavu, Puttur Vittla, Bantwala Parivara, Panja Kundakushi, Beddadka
Shiva	Swastika Anantheshwara Temple	Ballamanja, Machina Carstreet, Udupi Bengre, Manjeshwaram
Shiva	Swastika Manjunatha Temple	Kadri, Mangalore Dharmasthala, Belthangadi
Shiva	Swastika Mallikarjuna Temple	Thodikana, Sullia Carstreet, Kasaragod
Shiva	Swastika Kundeshwara Temple	Carstreet, Kundapura Vadera, Kundapura
Shiva	Swastika Agastyeshwara Temple	Kiri Manjeshwara, Kundapura
Shiva	Swastika Adinatheshwara Temple	Adyapadi, Bajpe
Shiva	Swastika Amrutheshwara Temple	Tiruvailu, Vamanjoor
Shiva	Swastika Udaneshwara Temple	Perdala, Katukukke
Shiva	Swastika Kotilingeshwara Temple	Koteshwara, Kundapura
Shiva	Swastika Karinjeshwara Temple	Karinja, Kavala Padoor
Shiva	Swastika Gokarnanatheshwara Temple	Kudroli, Mangalore
Shiva	Swastika Chandramoulishwara Temple	Carstreet, Udupi
Shiva	Swastika Trayambakeshwara Temple	Kalnad, Kasaragod
Shiva	Swastika Tuluveshwara Temple	Basrur, Kundapura
Shiva	Swastika Nandaneshwara Temple	Panamboor, Thokur
Shiva	Swastika Brahmalingeswara Temple	Maranakatte, Chittur
Shiva	Swastika Madhanantheshwara Temple	Madhur, Kasaragod
Shiva	Swastika Ramakunjeshwara Temple	Ramakunja, Uppinangadi
Shiva	Swastika Vishweshwara Temple	Yellur, Udupi
Shiva	Swastika Vishwakarmeshwara Temple	Yennegudde, Katapadi
Shiva	Swastika Sahasralingeshwara Temple	Dakshina Kashi/Gaya, Uppinangadi
Shiva	Swastika Seneshwara Temple	Shiroor, Byndoor
Shiva	Swastika Harihareshwara Temple	Harihara Pallathaka
Shakti/ Durga	Om Parashakthi Kshetra	Madyar, Kotekar
Shakti/ Durga	Om Durgaparameshwari Temple	Bappanadu, Mulky Kateel, Kondemula Chitrapura, Kulai Eruvailu, Moodabidre Devipura, Talapady Montethadka, Shibaje Sharavoor, Alankar Mandarthi, Barkur Uppunda, Kundapura Nandalike, Belman Kunjarugiri, Udupi Soukur, Kundapura Kemmannu, Nitte Malla, Muliyar Mundol, Karadka Aiyala, Uppala Agalpadi, Umbrangala
Shakti/ Durga	Om Jaya/Pancha/Brahmi Durgaparameshwari Temple	Kannarpadi, Udupi Poonja, Arambodi Kamalashile, Kundapura
Shakti/ Durga	Om Mahishamardini Temple	Neelavara, Barkur Kadiyali, Udupi
Shakti/ Durga	Om Mookambika Temple	Kollur, Jadkal
Lakshmi/Vishnu	Sri Lakshmi Janardhana Temple	Ellur, Karkala
Lakshmi/Vishnu	Sri Lakshmi Narasimha Temple	Kadeshwalya, Mani
Matrika	Sri Amrutheshwari Temple	Kota, Brahmavara
Matrika	Sri Khadgeshwari Temple	Madhya, Soorinje
Matrika	Sri Mangaladevi Temple	Bolara, Mangalore
Matrika	Sri Rajarajeshwari Temple	Polali, Kariangala
Matrika	Sri Mariyamma Temple	Halekote, Bolar, Mangalore Marigudi, Kaup Marigudi, Karkala Moornad, Kaup
Dashavatara	Swastika Gopalakrishna Temple	Kannipura, Kumble
Dashavatara	Swastika Gopinatha Temple	Attavara, Mangalore
Dashavatara	Swastika Chennakeshava Temple	Carstreet, Sullia
Dashavatara	Swastika Narasimha Temple	Saligrama, Brahmavara Rattadi, Udupi
Dashavatara	Swastika Ramachandra Temple	Ashwathapura, Kadandale
Rudravathara	Swastika Mukhyaprana Temple	Halekote, Mangalore
Rudravathara	Swastika Hanumantha Temple	Hampankatte, Mangalore
Rudravathara	Swastika Veerabhadra Temple	Hiriadka, Udupi
Surya	Swastika Soorya Narayana Temple	Maroli, Padil Naravi, Belthangadi
Nagabrahma	Swastika Nagabrahma Temple	Paduperara, Bajpe
Guru	Shirdi Saibaba Temple	Ladyhill, Mangalore Kudroli, Mangalore Shamboor, Bantwala
Guru	Brahma Shree Narayana Guru Temple	Kolya, Kotekar Karnad, Mulky Bappallige, Puttur Ganadapadpu, Bantwala
