= New Woodlands Hotel =

Indian restaurant

Coordinates: 13.045365°N 80.262248°E

The New Woodlands Hotel is a Udupi-style vegetarian restaurant in Chennai, India. Established in 1938 by Kadandale Krishna Rao, it is considered to be a pioneer in popularizing Udupi cuisine in the city. Since then, a large number of imitations and namesake Woodlands hotels have been established in various parts of Chennai.

== History ==
The New Woodlands Hotel was founded by K. Krishna Rao, who was born to a Hindu priest in Kadandale near Mangalore on 21 October 1898. Poverty in the family forced Krishna Rao to seek a job at an early age. He worked for some time in one of the mathas in Udupi and for some time as a "helper" in a hotel near Kadandale. In the early 1920s, he moved to Chennai at the advice of his brother-in-law. In Chennai, he worked in various positions at a hotel as a cleaner, helper, server and finally, junior cook. The owner of the restaurant was impressed by his hard work and dedication and made him the manager of one of his hotels on Acharappan Street in Georgetown.

In 1926, Krishna Rao moved to Anna Salai where he set up his hotel, Udupi Sri Krishna Vilas, in partnership with the owner of another Udupi restaurant, the Udupi Hotel nearby. When the two ended their partnership in 1933, Krishna Rao inherited the Udupi Hotel as his share. Later, he also purchased Udupi Sri Krishna Vilas from the then-owner.

In 1938, the Raja of Ramnad estate sold one of his posh residences in Royapettah, Chennai, to a building contractor named Bangalore Munivenkatappa, who started the Woodlands Hotel (a.k.a. Old Woodlands or Royapettah Woodlands). Krishna Rao, then a successful restaurateur, took the hotel on lease in the early 1940s from Bangalore Munivenkatappa and made it into one of the leading hotels in Chennai at that time. After the lease expired, Krishna Rao was denied renewal by its owners, which prompted him to purchase land at Dr. Radhakrishna Road, Mylapore, to set up the "New Woodlands Hotel". Kadandale Krishna Rao can be considered the inventor of masala dosa.

Like many other Udupi restaurants, the New Woodlands maintained a separate section for Brahmins until the 1960s.

== See also ==
- List of vegetarian and vegan restaurants
- List of hotels in Chennai
