= Central Tiffin Room =

Central Tiffin room

Restaurant information
- Established: 1920s
- Owner: Sanjeeva S Poojari
- Previous owner: Y.V. Subramanyam (founder)
- Food type: South Indian
- Location: Malleshwaram and Terminal 2, Kempegowda International Airport, Bengaluru, Karnataka, India
- Seating capacity: 52

Central Tiffin Room (CTR) or Sri Sagar Hotel is a heritage restaurant in northwest Bangalore established in the 1920s by Y.V. Subramanyam. It is notable for its Masala Dosas that come in butter and non butter variants. It is situated at the 7th Cross Road corner of Margosa Road, Malleshwaram, opposite to the Malleshwaram Grounds. Note that in India, the term "hotel" can often mean a restaurant.

== History ==
=== Founders ===
This hotel was started by Y.V. Subramanyam and brothers (Y.V. Srikanteshwaran, Y.V. Krishna Iyer and Y.V. Ramachandran) in the 1920s. They hailed from a village called Yelagondahalli, Mulbagal taluk, Kolar district, whose residents are Ashtagrama Iyers of Kannada and Tamil origin. It is recorded that during the visit by the Maharaja of Mysore, Y.V. Subramanyam supplied and served breakfast in traditional attire. They opened another hotel in Krishna Buildings, Avenue Road. This was a famous meeting place for writers and artists in the 1940s and 1950s, and its name is mentioned in many books and articles. Y.V. Ramachandran, the youngest of the brothers, was a Freedom Fighter. Subramanyam was the founder president of the Bangalore Hoteliers Association in BVK Iyengar Road, which later became the Karnataka Hotel Owners Association. Changed circumstances in the huge joint family caused Subramanyam to sell his hotel in as is a condition in the mid-1950s. It is said the brothers passed on tips about preparations to the new owners along with advice to take care of workers by not overburdening them.

=== Later owners ===
It was established as Shree Sagar in 1950 by Raghavendra and the management was passed on to Ramakrishna Holla in 1952. In 1992, Sanjeeva S. Poojari purchased the restaurant and renamed it as Shri Sagar, formerly known as Central Tiffin Room (CTR). Today it is referred to by both names says Poojari

The restaurant was renovated in 2011 to add more capacity. It still has a vintage wall clock and rosewood furniture with Italian marble table tops.

In 2024, a new branch at the Terminal 2 of Bengaluru's Kempegowda International Airport was opened.

== Cuisine ==
Sri Sagar serves only vegetarian food and is crowded for most of its operating hours.

== Awards ==
It has won awards including the Times Food Guide "Best Benne Masala Dosa in Bangalore" and Burrp.com's "Best Benne Masala in Bangalore".
