= Kandavara Brahmin =

Kandavara Brahmins
Regions with significant populations
- Dakshina Kannada, Udupi

Languages
- Tulu, Kannada, Sanskrit

Religion
- Hinduism

Kandavara Brahmins are Smartha Brahmins who originated from Kandavara in South Canara. They live in Mangalore, Udupi, Bengaluru, Thirthahalli, Sringeri, Shimoga etc.

== History ==
The Name Kandavara is derived from Skandavara/Skandapura. Unlike other Brahmins who embraced Dwaita due to the efforts of Madhavacharya and Vadiraja Theertha, Kandavara Brahmins remained Bhasma Dharis or Smarthas following Advaita Philosophy. They are disciples of Sringeri Sharada Peetha and Balekudru Shreematha.

== Language ==
The Kandavara Brahmins speak Tulu in South Canara and Kannada in Malnad. In Kundapura they speak Kundagannada.

== See also ==
- Shivalli Brahmins
- Balekudru Shreematha
- Sringeri
