= Lalitha Mahal =

Royal residence and luxury hotel in Mysore, India

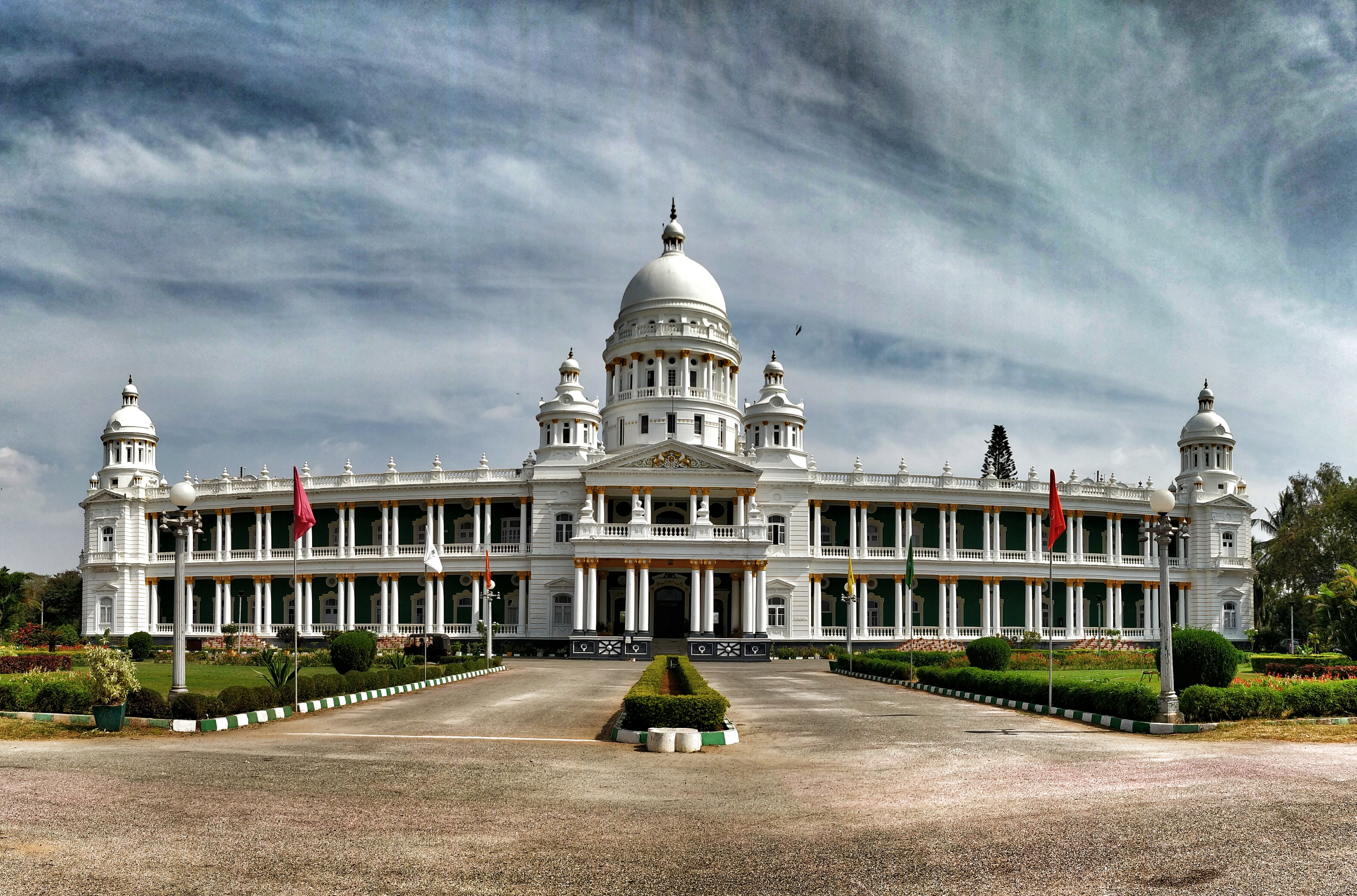
- Panoramic view of Lalitha Mahal
- Interactive map of the Lalitha Mahal area

General information
- Architectural style: Renaissance architecture
- Location: Mysore, India
- Coordinates: 12.298°N 76.693°E
- Construction started: 1921
- Completed: 20th century
- Cost: ₹1.3 million
- Client: Krishnaraja Wodeyar IV, Mysore Kingdom

Technical details
- Structural system: Stone masonry and marble

Design and construction
- Architect: E.W. Fritchley

The Lalitha Mahal, now renamed Lalitha Mahal Palace Hotel, is a luxury hotel located in a former royal residence, and the second largest palace in the southern Indian city of Mysore, Karnataka, after the Mysore Palace. It is located near the Chamundi Hills, east of the city. The palace was built in 1921 by Maharaja Krishnaraja Wodeyar IV for the exclusive stay of the Governor-General of India.

Built on a raised ground, the palace was fashioned on the lines of St Paul's Cathedral in London.

The palace is painted pure white. It was converted into a heritage hotel in 1974. It was run as a part of the Ashok Group of the India Tourism Development Corporation (ITDC) under the Government of India until 2018 when it was transferred to a unit of the Government of Karnataka. However, a veneer of the original royal ambience of the palace is maintained.

== History ==
The Lalitha Mahal palace dates to the early 20th century, built during the Kingdom of Mysore and British India. The palace was constructed with a reasonable amount of money out of the kingdom's annual income of two million pounds at that time. The palace was built in 1921 initially for the exclusive stay of the Governor-General of India and subsequently used as a guest house for European guests of the Maharaja.

== Architecture ==
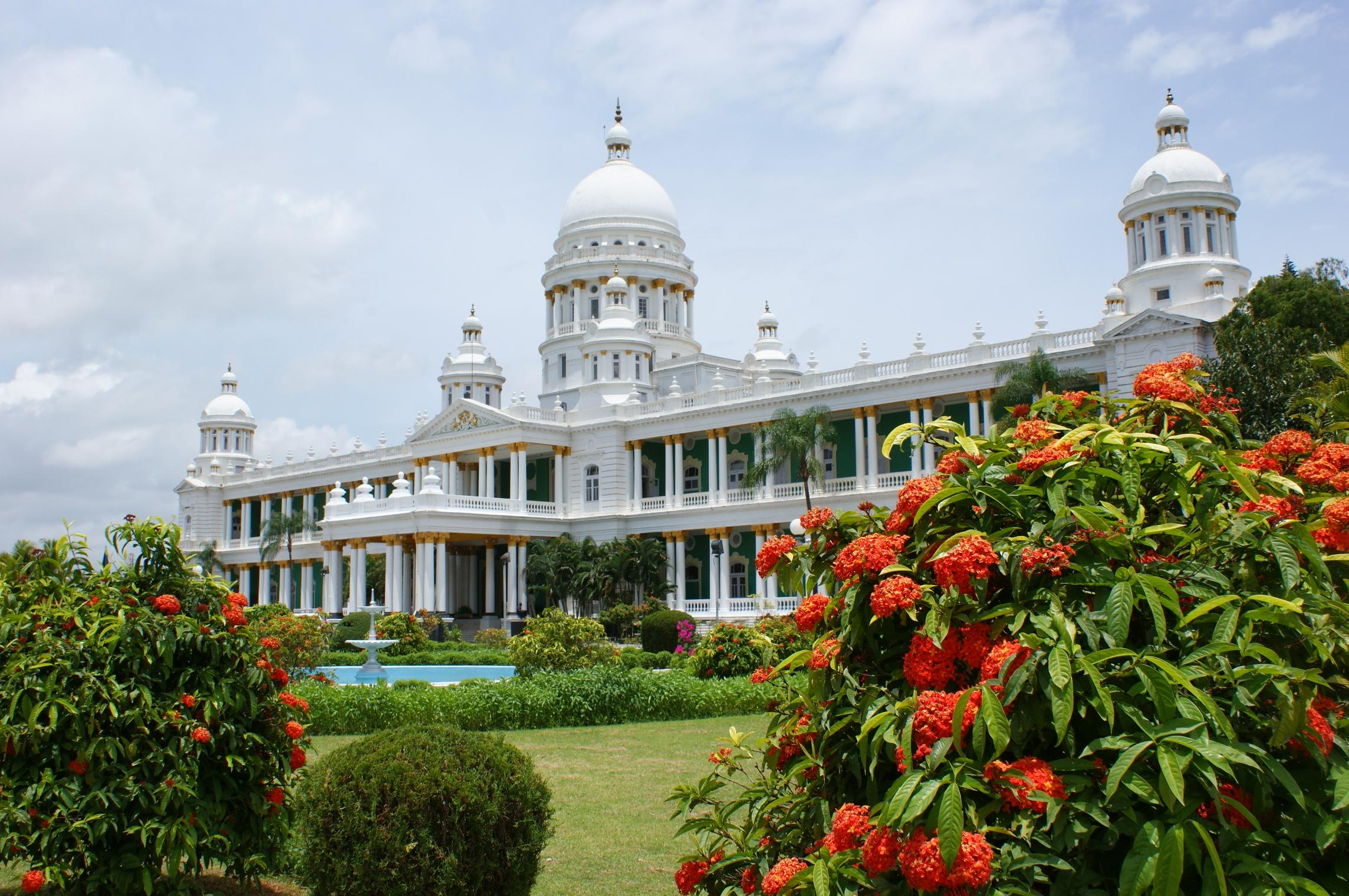
Lalitha Mahal at Mysore – now a five-star hotel – is a host to visiting dignitaries and VIPs

Set amidst sprawling landscaped gardens below the Chamundi hills, the palace was planned by Edwin Wolleston Fritchley, the architect from Bombay (Mumbai) and constructed by B Munivenkatappa. Work started in 1921 and completed in 1930. The palace built in Renaissance architectural style is considered an adaptation of the St. Paul's Cathedral in London, particularly the central dome. The architecture of the palace reflects English manor houses and Italian palazzos. It is a two storied structure. The supporting structure of the palace is of Ionic double column. At the ground level, there is a projecting porch. Spherical domes with the dominating central dome sets the front elevation of the palace. Decorative stained glass has been extensively used both in the exterior facades and in interiors doors, windows and ceilings.

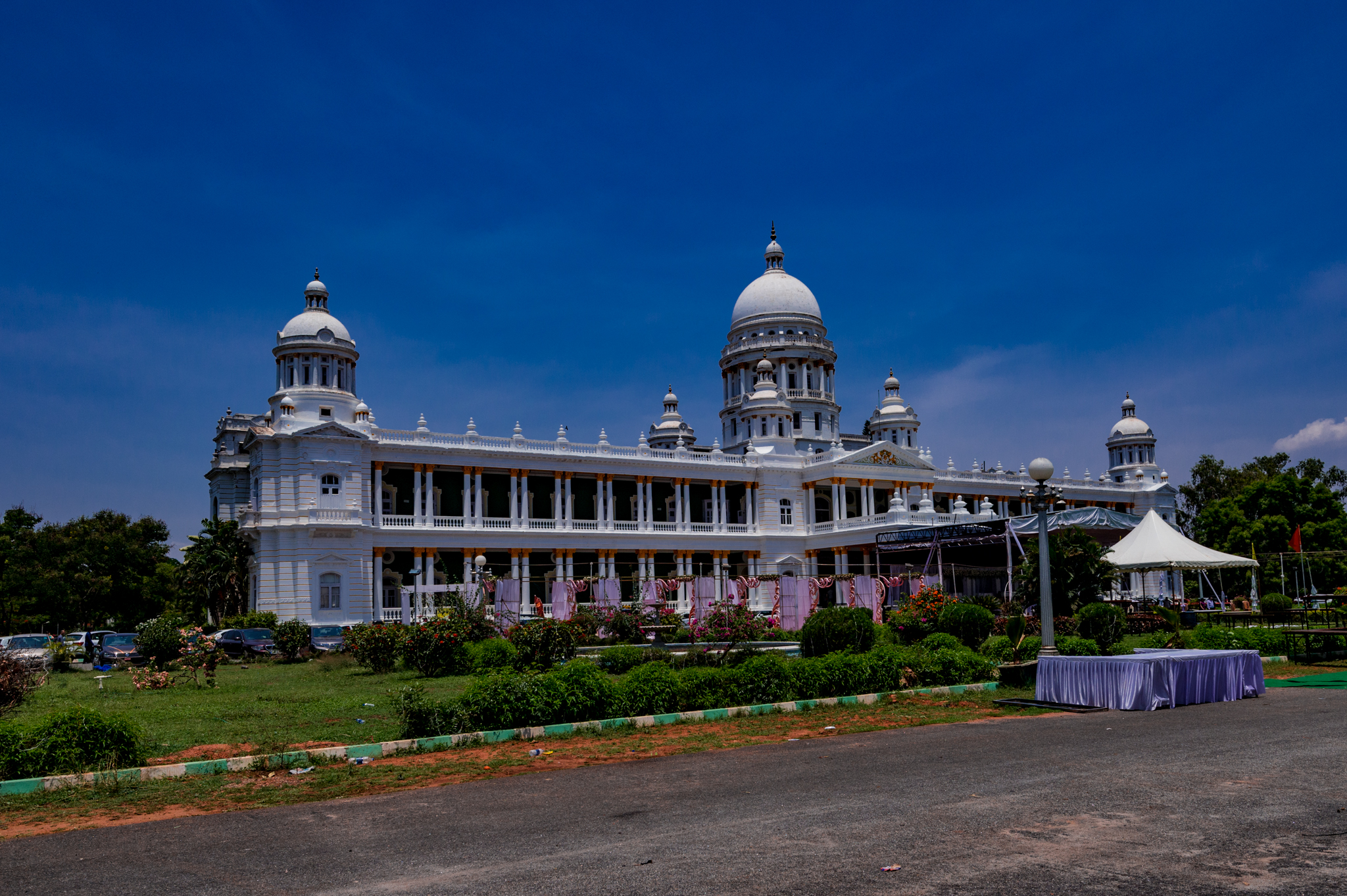
Lalitha Mahal - Palace to stay for the VIP as well ordinary citizens

The palace has a viceroy room, a banquet hall, a dancing floor and an Italian marble staircase (has an arresting curve) and also embellished with small ornamentations, which are said to be replicas from various palaces in Britain. The full length portraits of the Wodeyar Kings, Italian marble floors and Belgian crystal chandeliers, cut glass lamps, heavy ornate furniture, mosaic tiles and a couple of exquisite Persian carpets gives the palace its regal ambience. With conversion of the palace into a heritage hotel, interiors have been modified to provide for modern conveniences but most of the earlier sections of the palace such as the dancing and banquet halls have been retained in their original elegance but adopted as dining halls and conference halls for holding meetings and conventions; these have polished wooden flooring and three stain glassed domes in the ceiling. The ball room in particular, which has been converted into the Dining Hall of the hotel, is a baroque hall with immensely high ceiling with domed skylights made of Belgian glass. A swimming pool is now an additional provision. The elevator, carpeting and the Ottoman, upholstered with tapestry are treasured items in the palace.

== Gallery ==
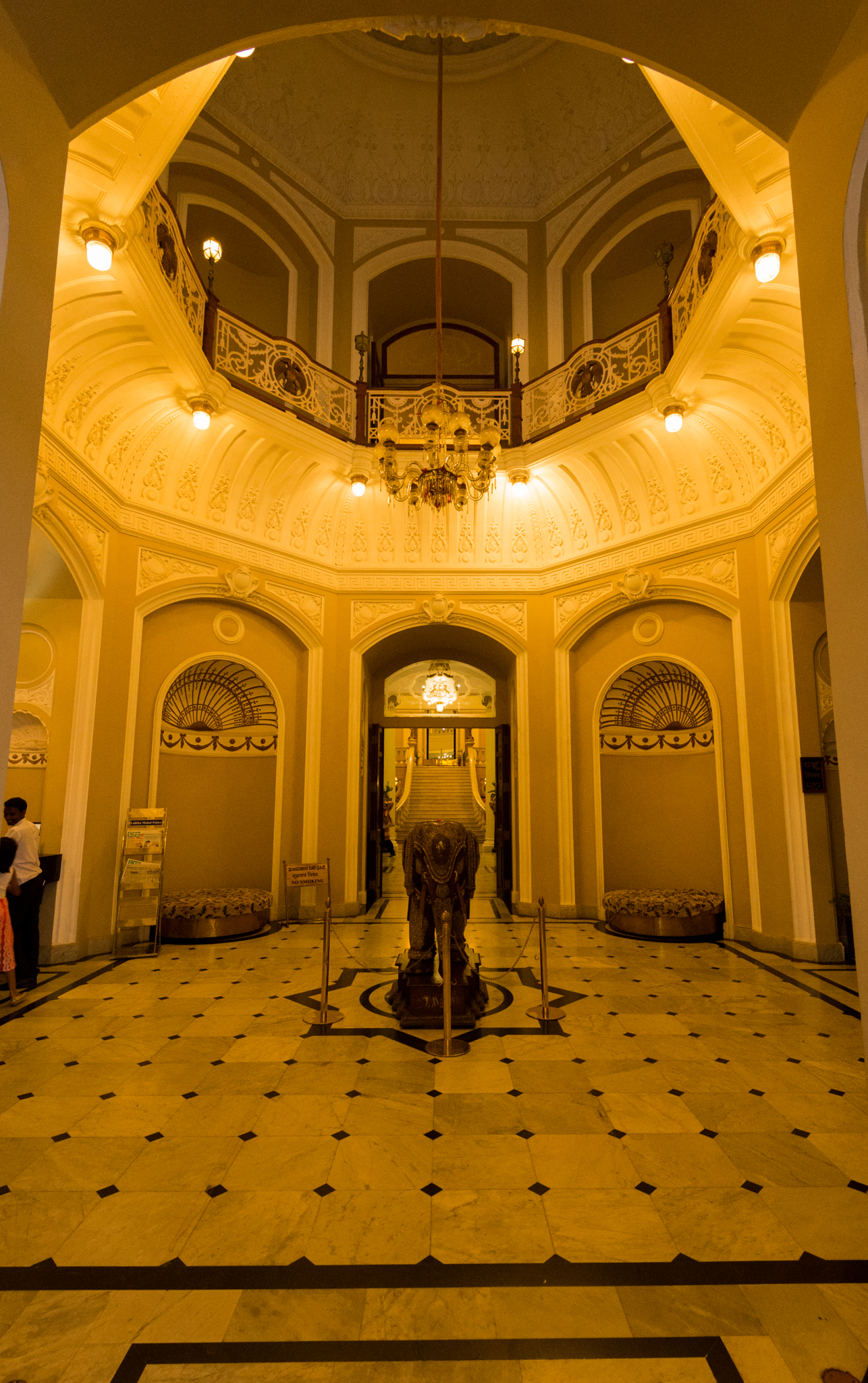
The Reception Hall of the Palace

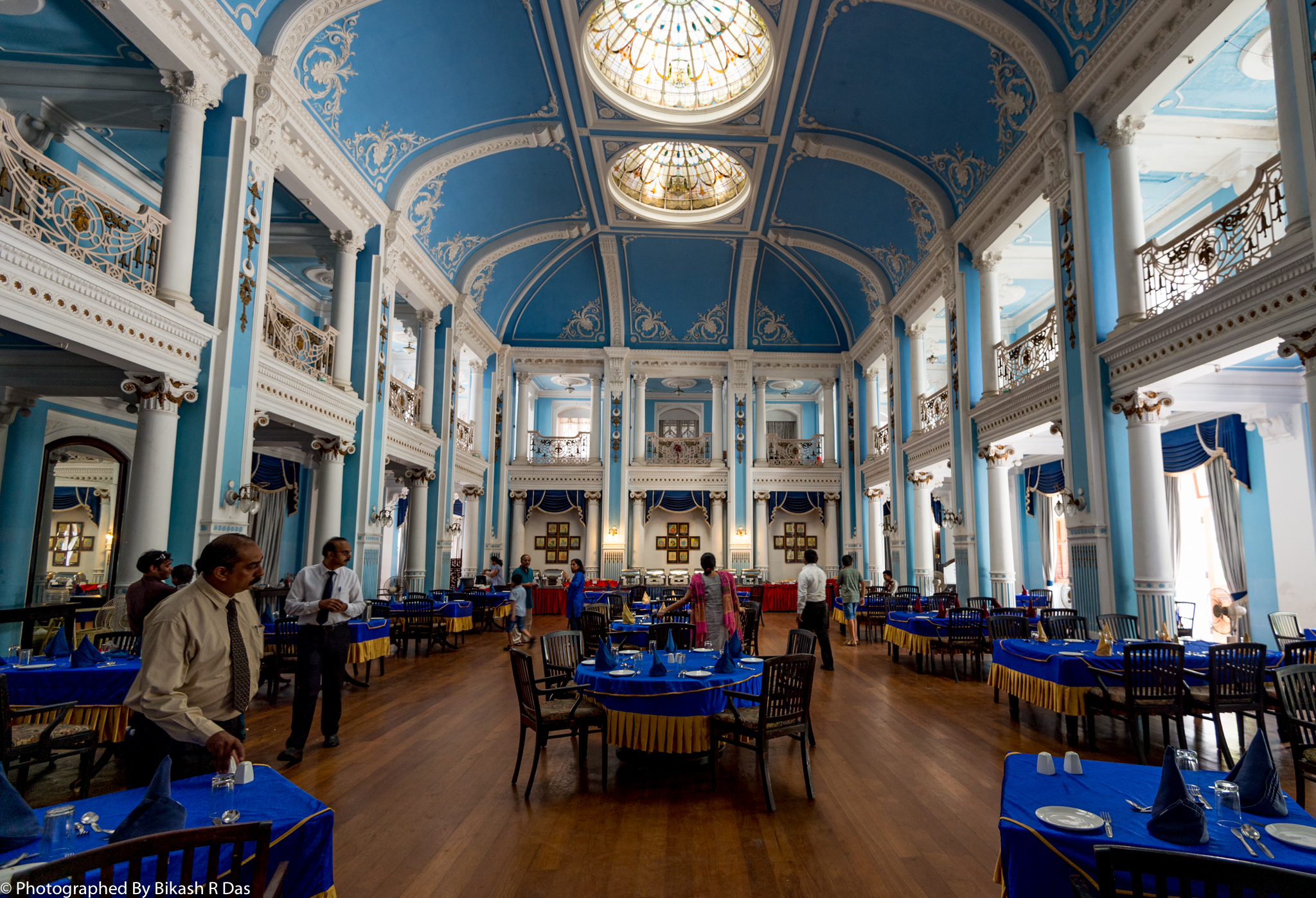
The Grand Ballroom which is now the Dining Hall of Lalitha Mahal Palace Hotel

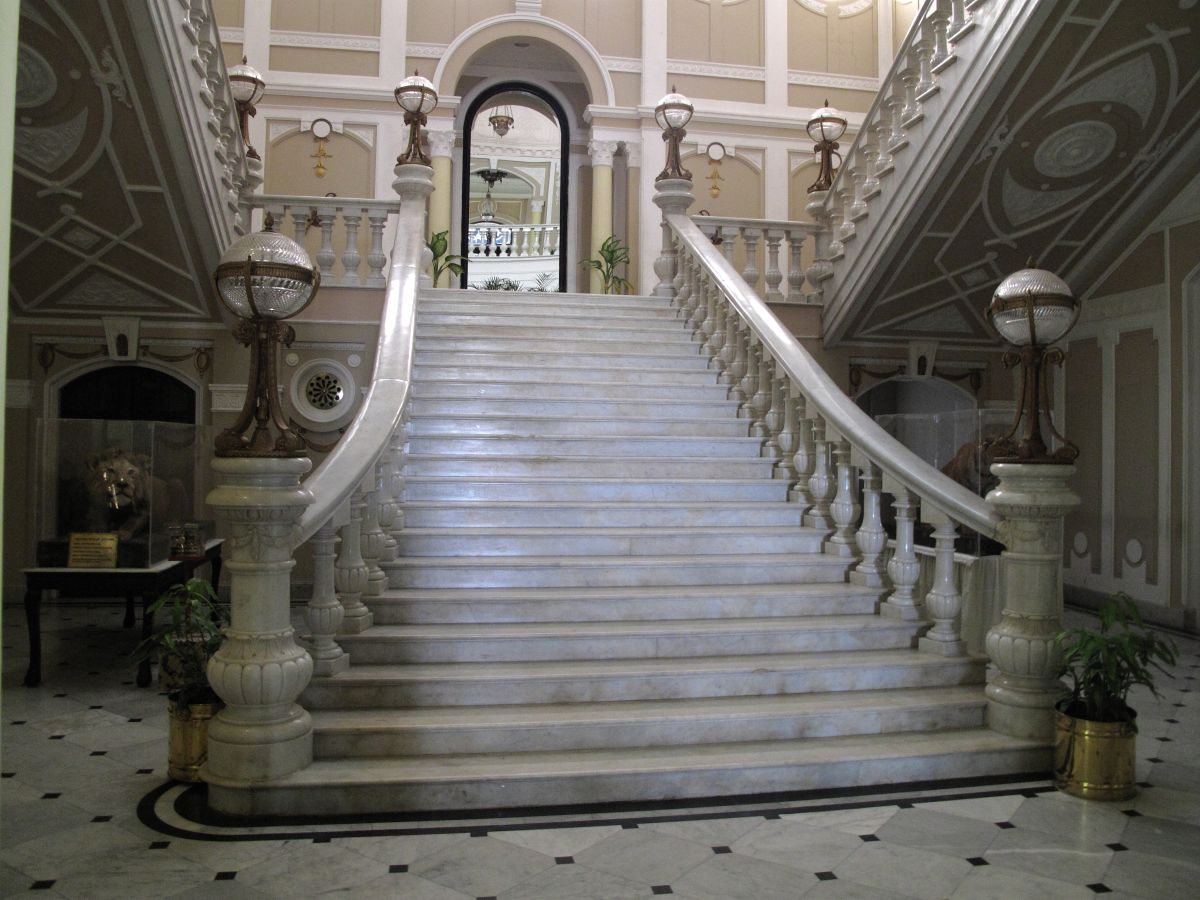
The main stairway made of Italian marble.

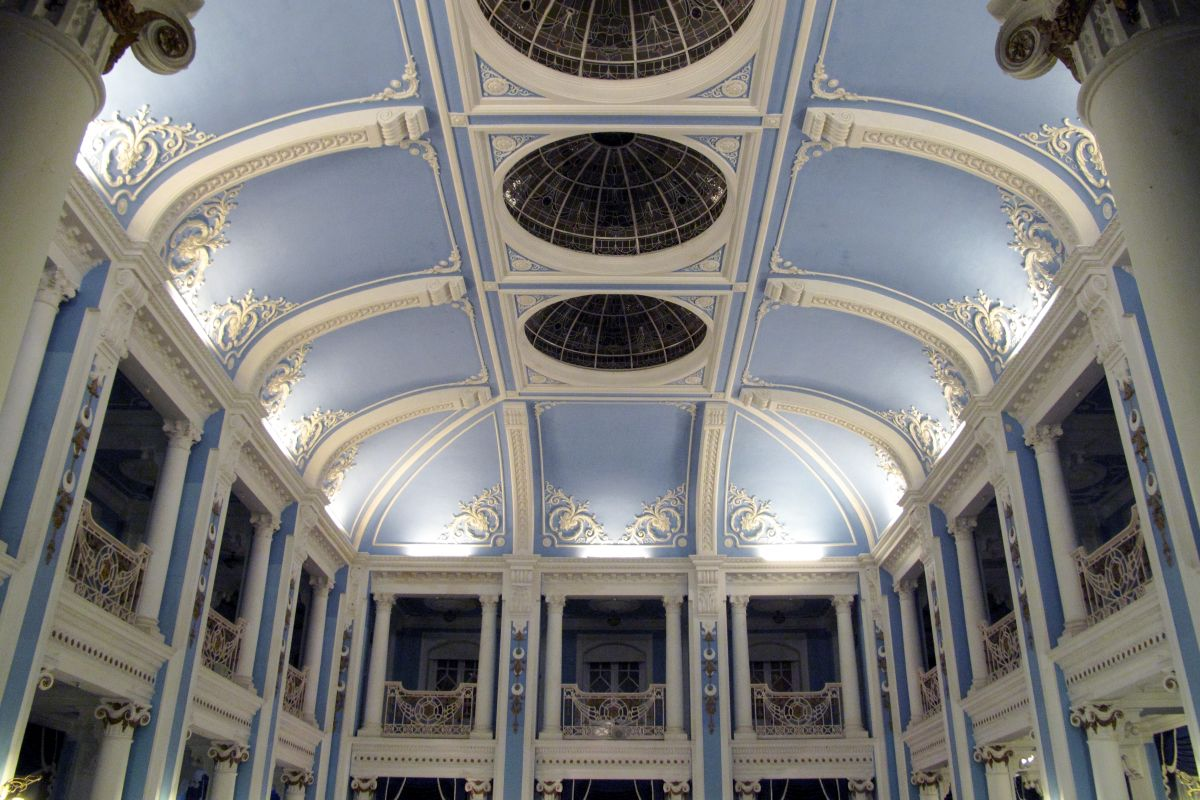
The Ballroom - Three Domed skylights made of Belgian glass

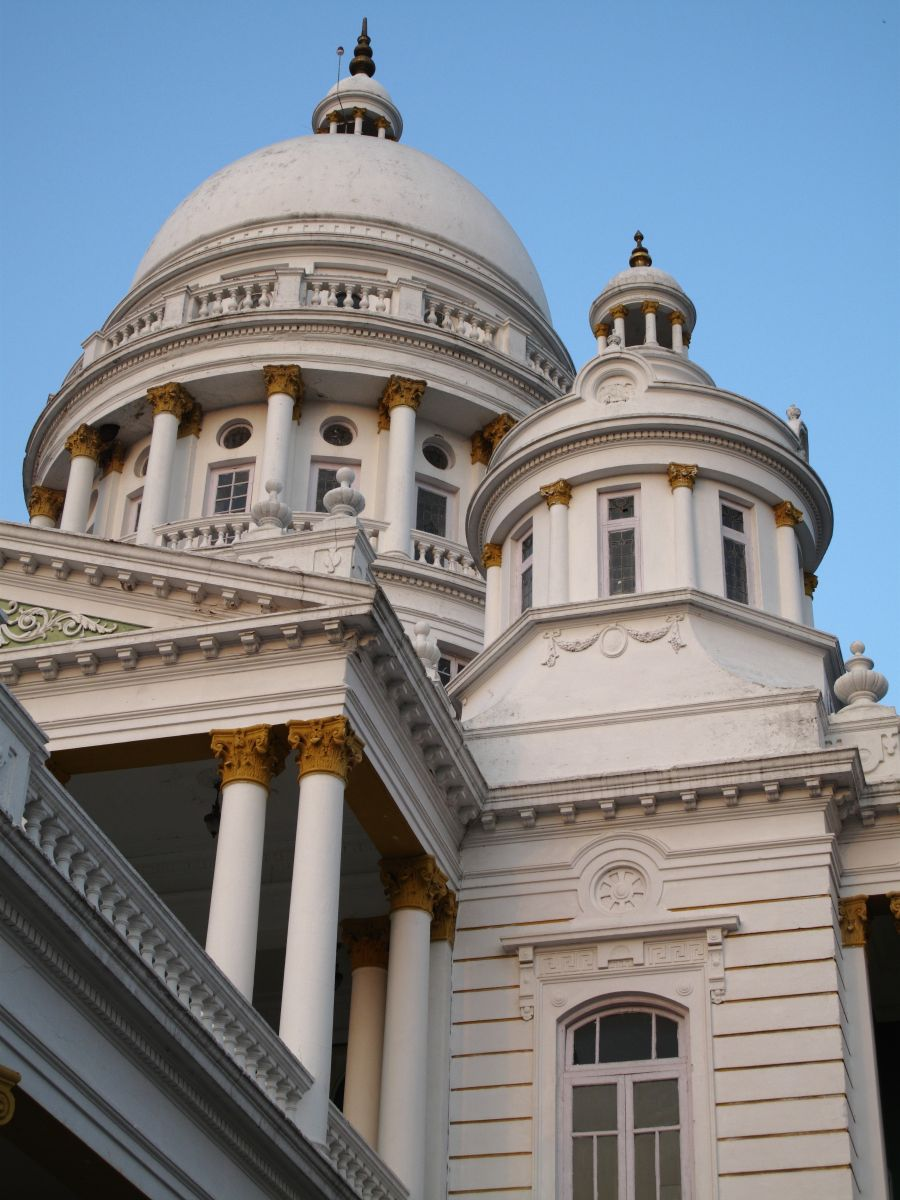
Lalitha Mahal Palace

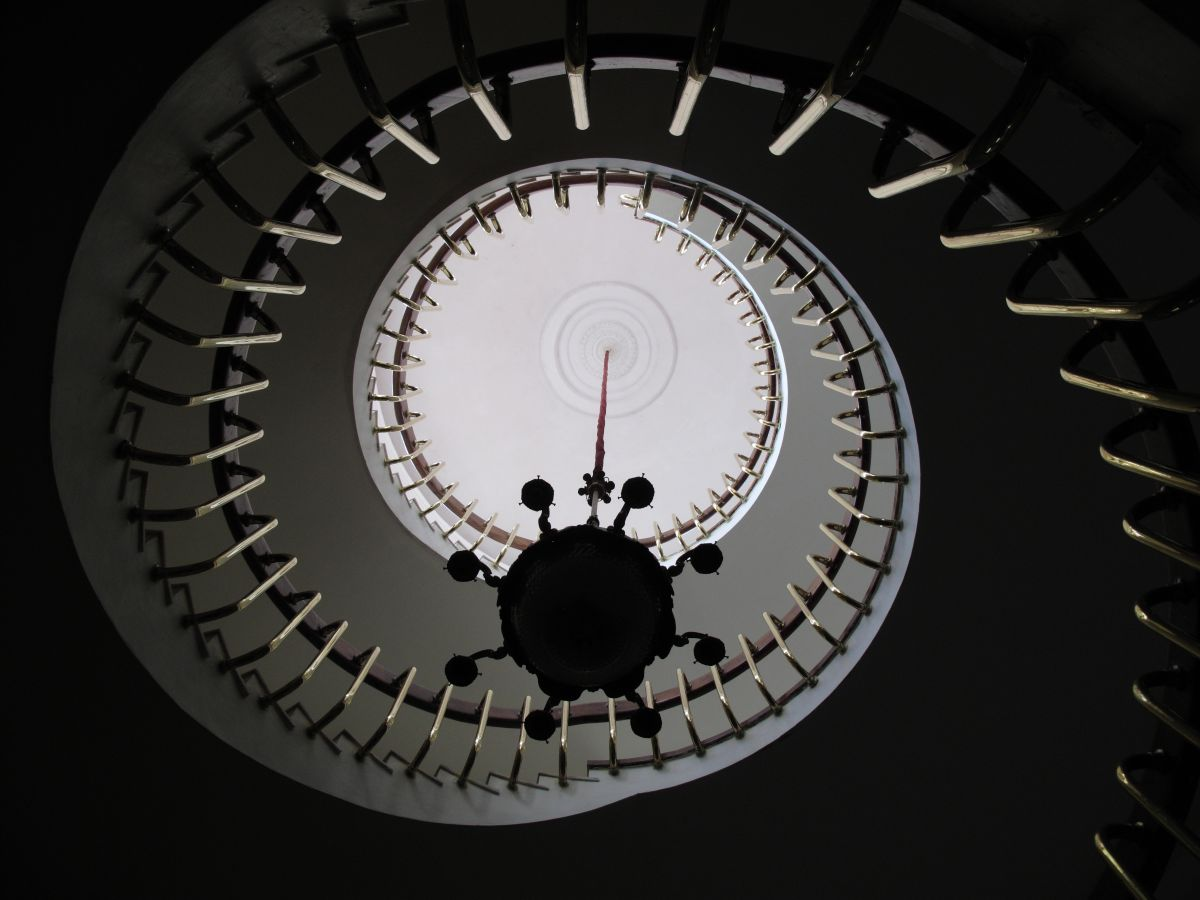
The spiral staircase

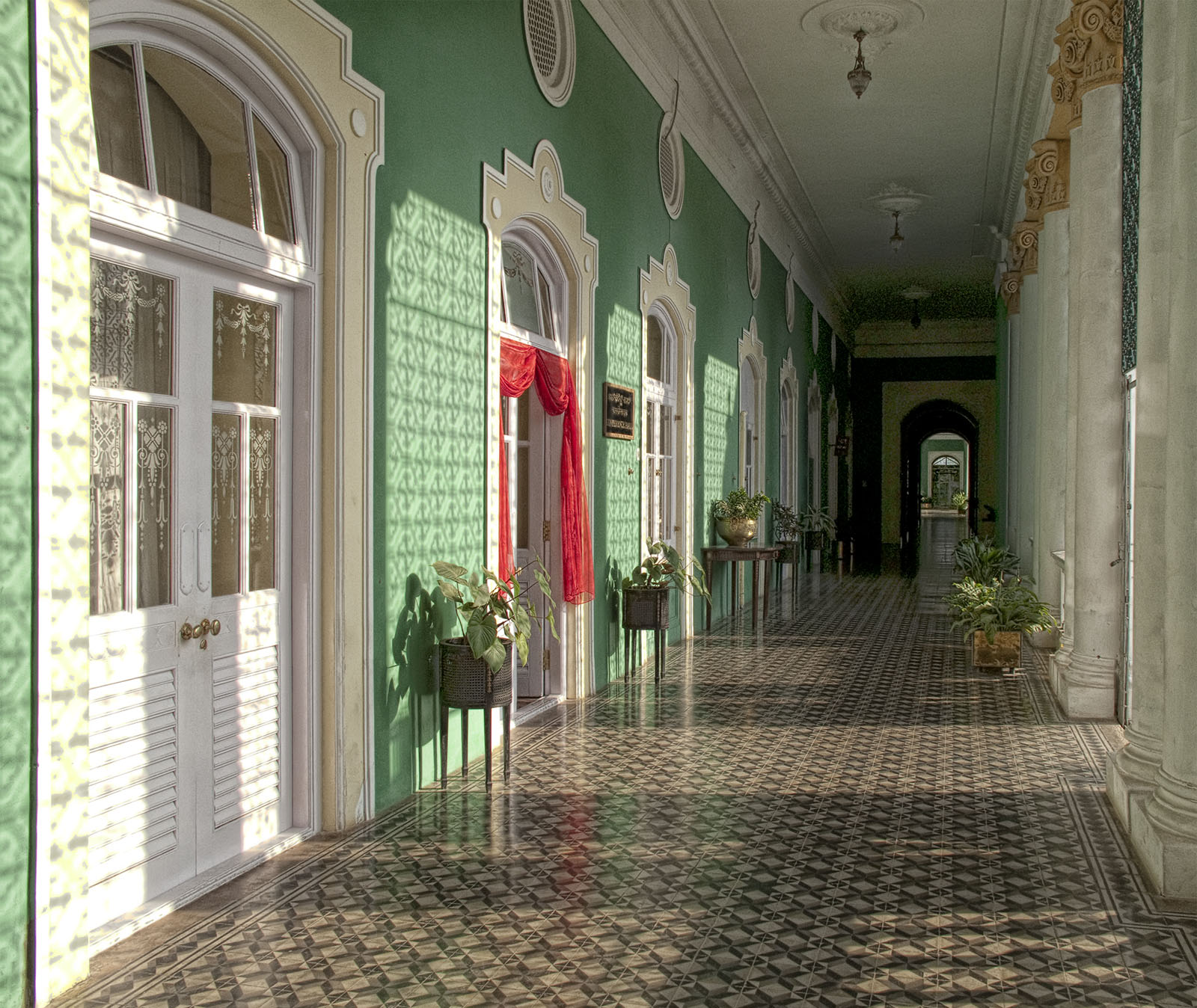
Lalitha Mahal Palace

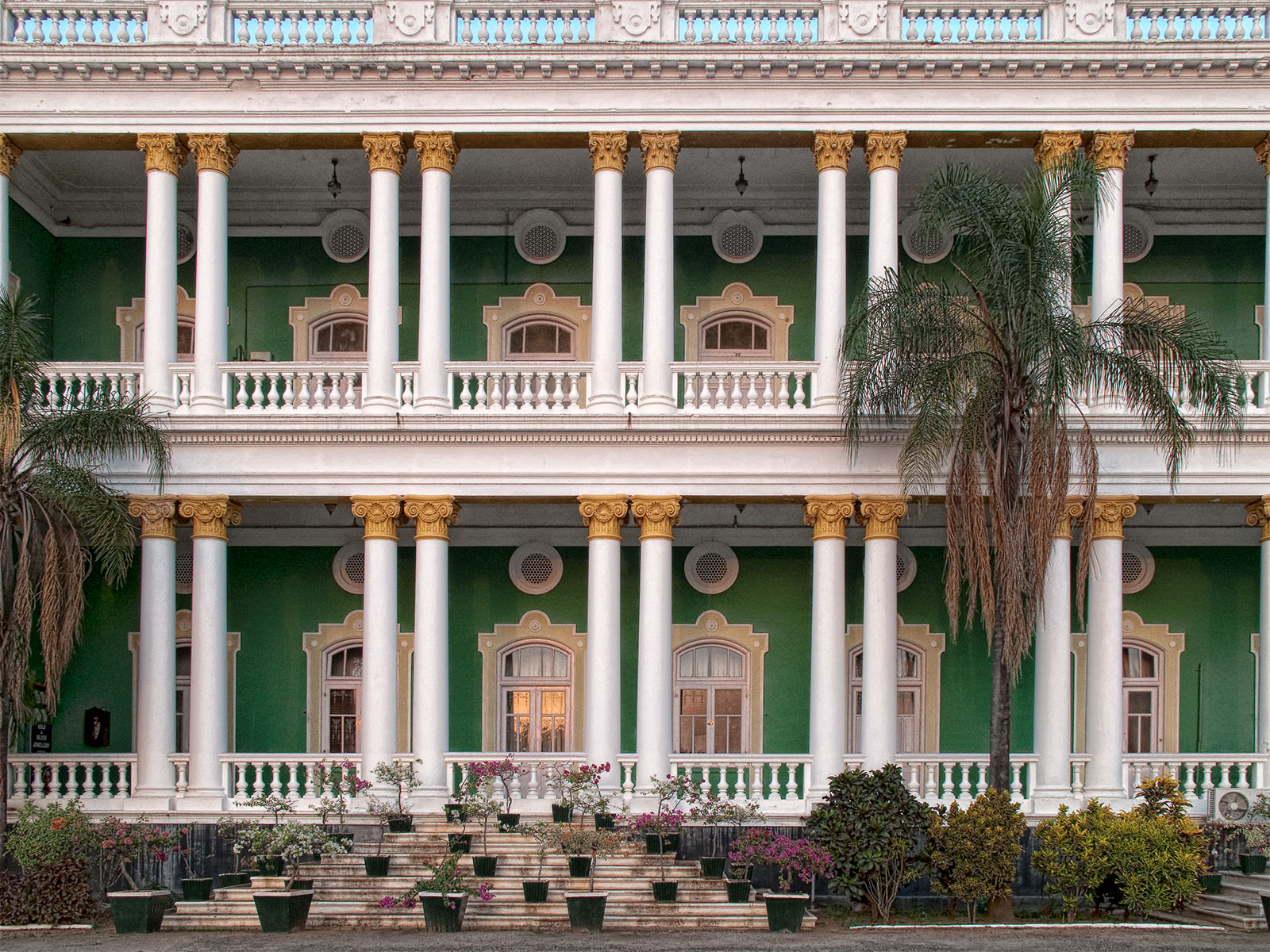
Lalitha Mahal

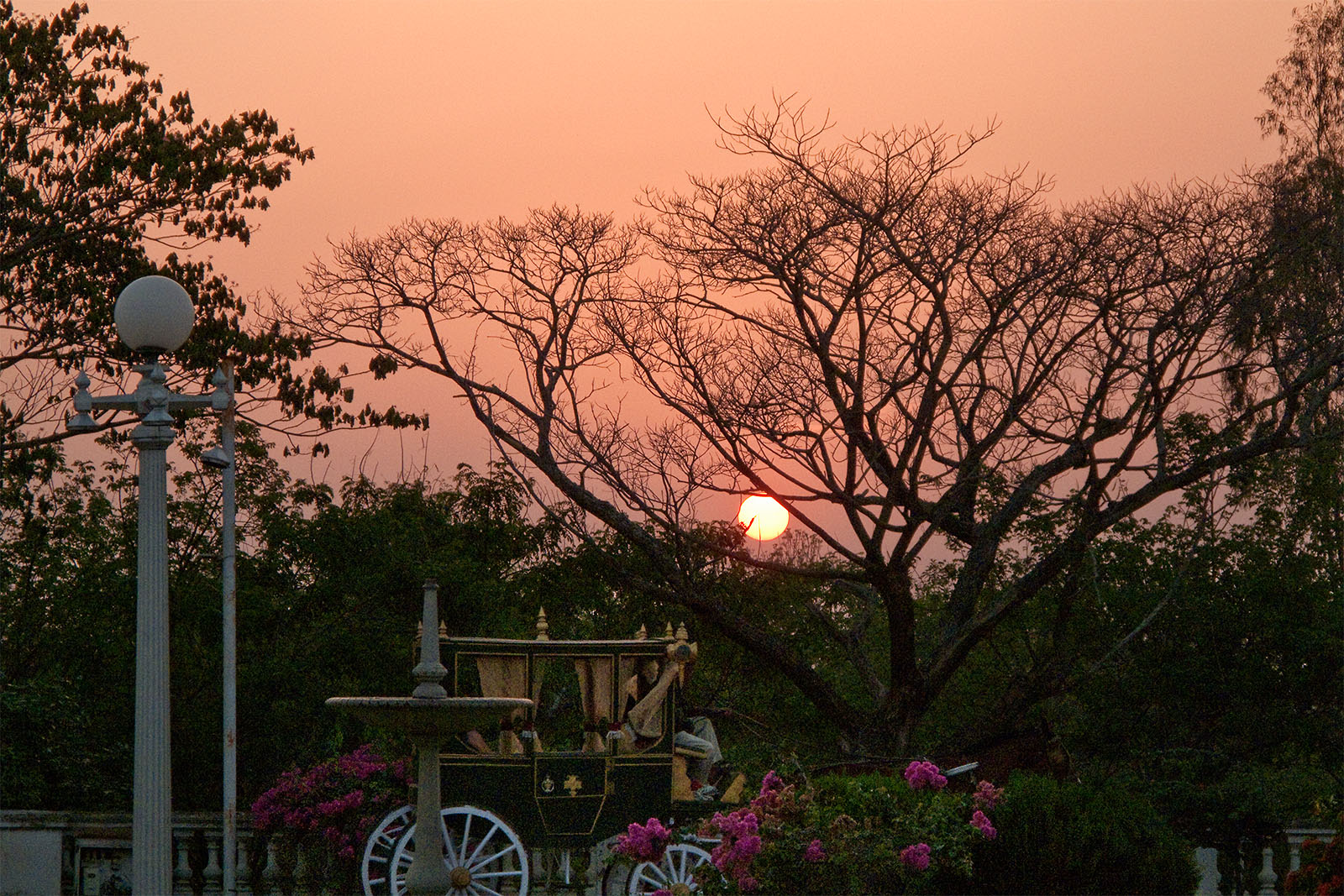
The Ottoman or Buggy

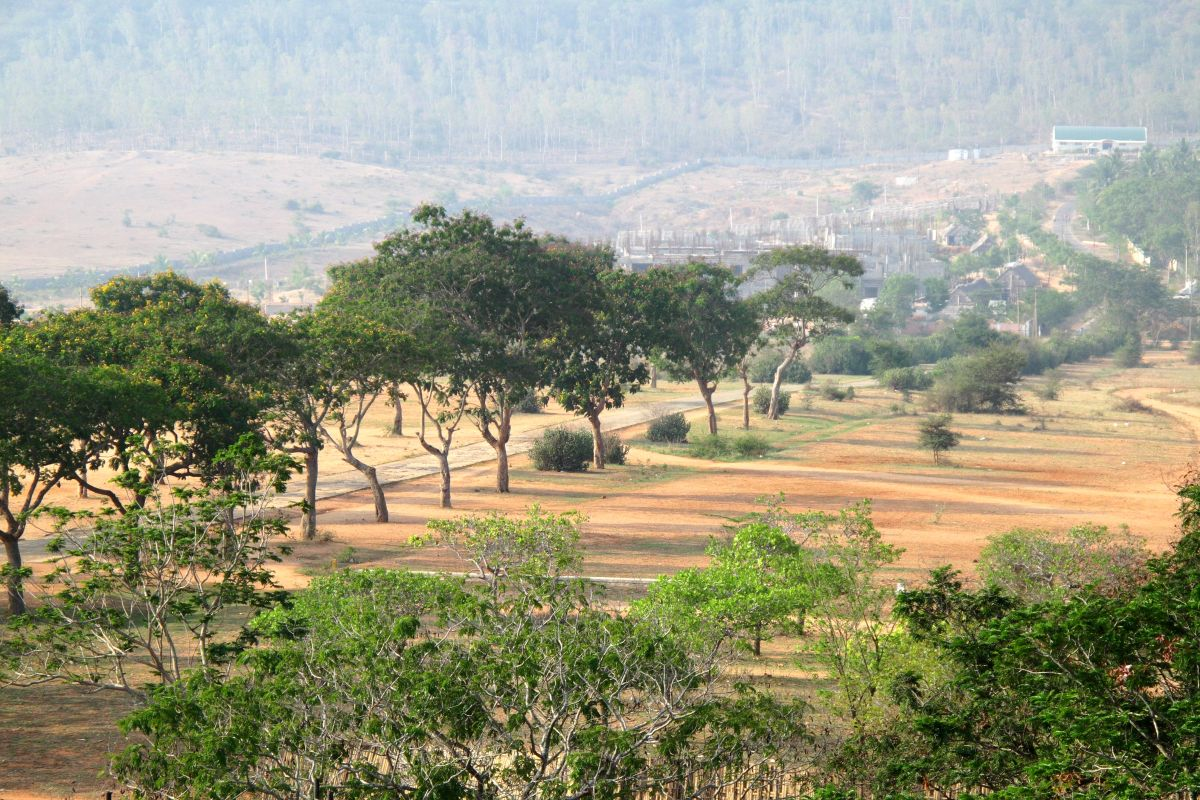
Garden from the terrace of the Lalitha Mahal Palace

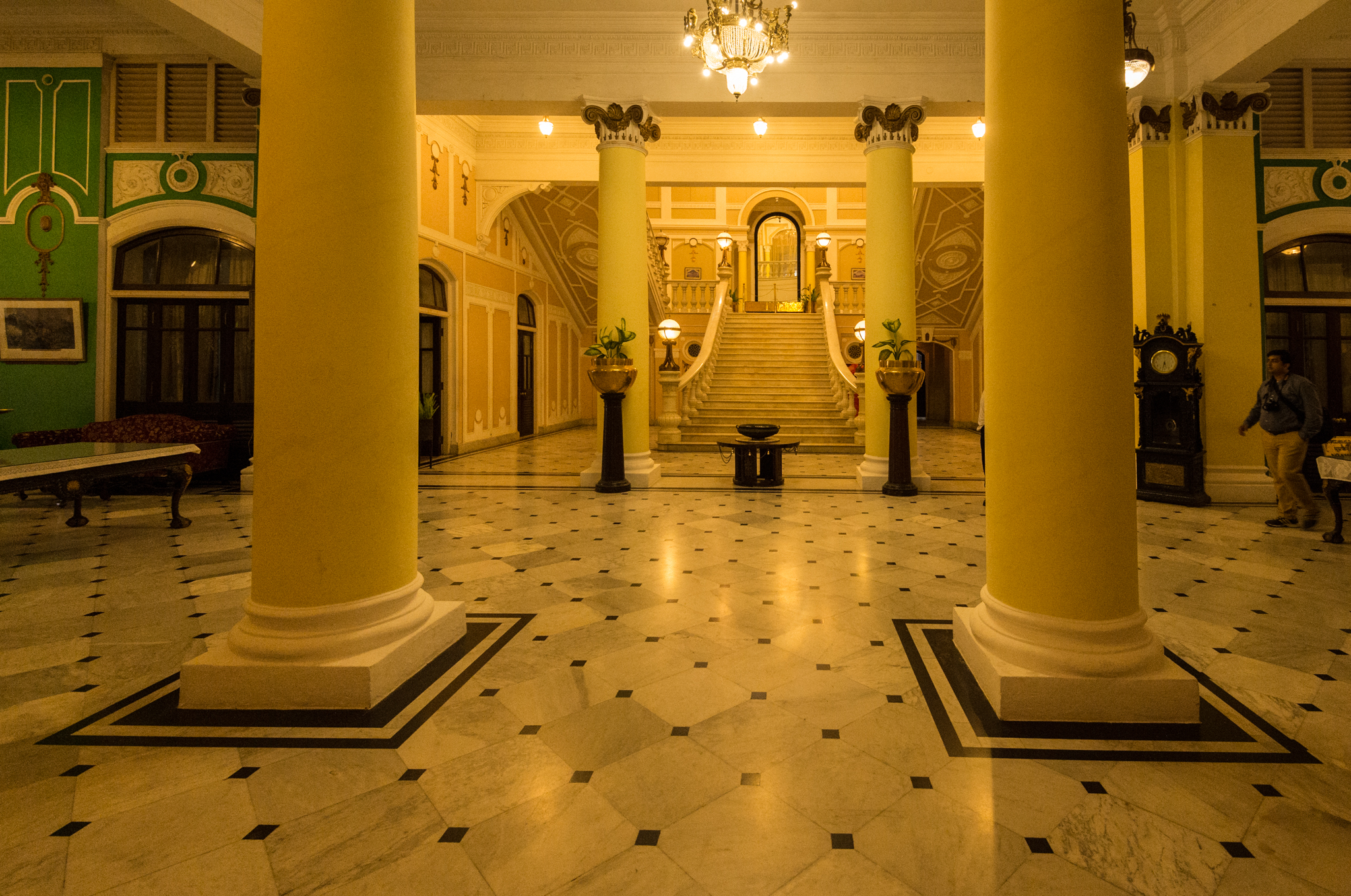
The Primary Stairway of the Palace and Porch

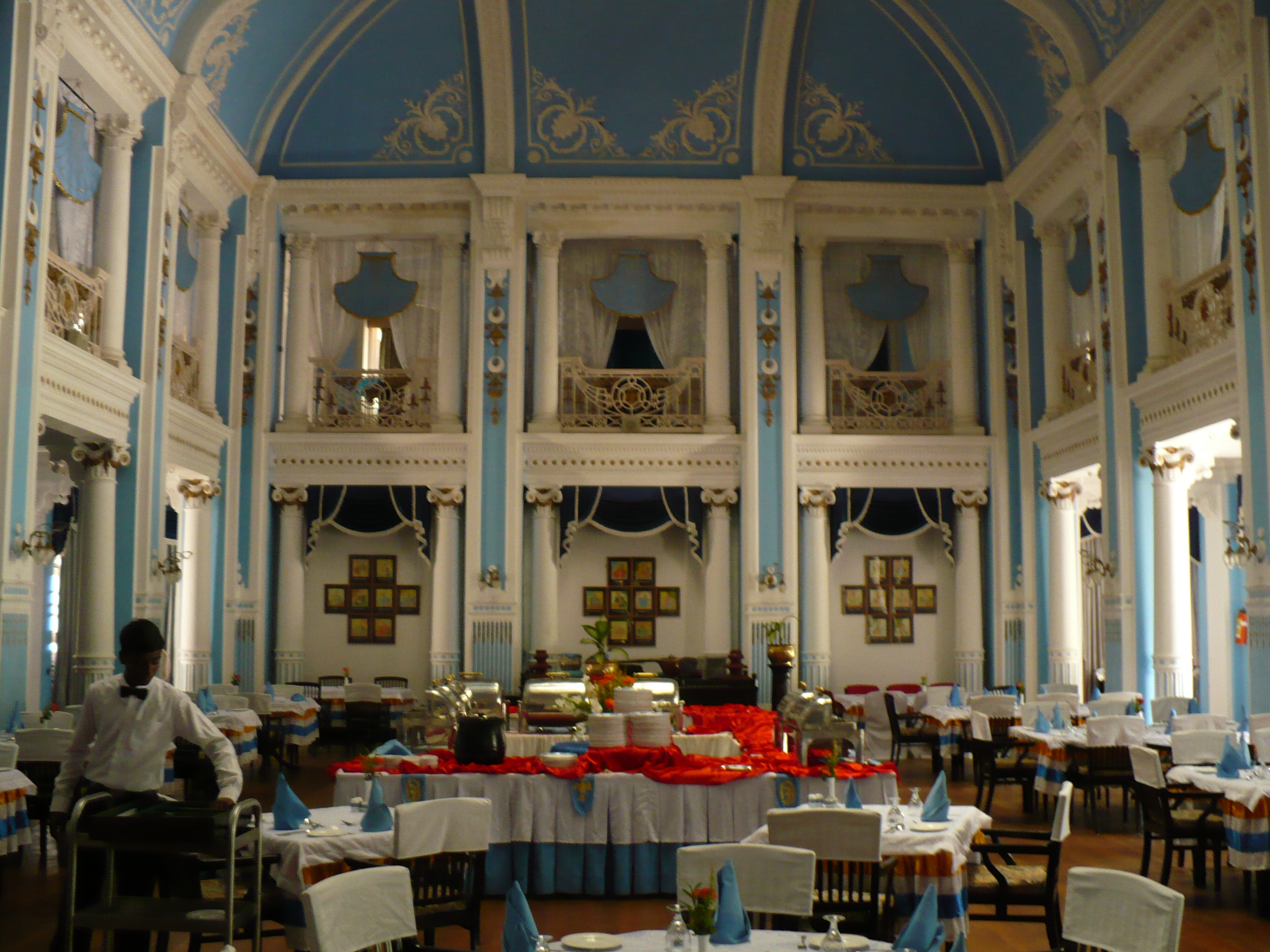
interior

== See also ==
- List of Heritage Buildings in Mysore
