= Balekudru Shreematha =

Balekudru Shri Matha
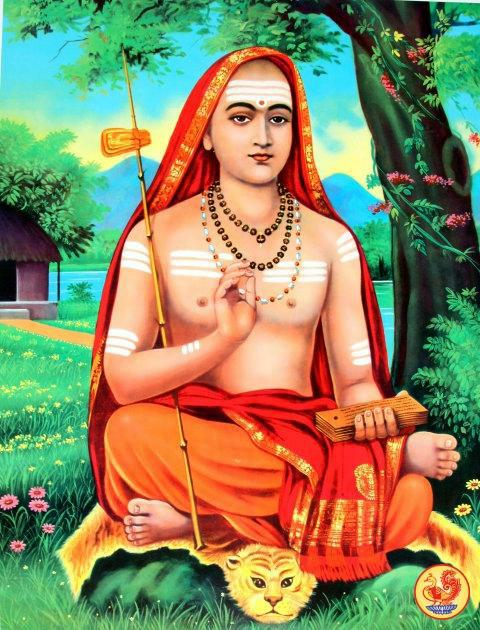
- Shri Adi Shankara: Divisions based on sect: Smarthaism

Balakudru Shrimatha is the Gurupeetha for the brahmins of South Canara who follow Advaitha philosophy. The ashram is headed now by Shri Shri Narasimha Ashrama Swamiji, who also selected his successor-designate Shri Vasudeva Sadashiva Ashrama Swamiji on 22nd Nov 2024 in Bengaluru in the traditional manner.

== Location ==
Balakudru Shrimatha is situated at the confluence of Sita and Swarna Rivers. The main deity is God Narasimha. This place is near Hangarakatte Village in Udupi district of Karnataka state.

== History ==
"Balakudru Sreematha" follows the Bhagavatha Sampradaya according to Advaitha which is well established all around India by Shri Adi Shankaracharya, the uplifter of Sanatana Dharma. This is the only Advaitha Peeta in entire Dakshina Kannada and Udupi districts. This Shri Matha has more than thousands of years of history and is stated to be founded by Kaivalyashrama Swamy. This is the ‘Sannidhi’ of Lord Lakshminarasimha, Goddess Sharadamba, Sangameshwara, Heramba Ganapathi, and Varadaanjaneya. This is situated in a place by name ‘Hangaarakatte’ located in between the National Highway of Udupi-Kundapur which is near the confluence of ‘Sita’ and ‘Swarna’ rivers. The beautiful idol of the God Shri Lakshminarasimha is stated to be brought from Badari Kshetra by Kaivalyashrama Swamy. There are several branches of this Matha in Karnataka.

The fact that when the Shreematha is established is unknown. As per the tradition of Shreematha, it is believed that Sage Kaivalyashrama who belongs to the tradition of Kumārila Bhaṭṭa (one who believed as the disciple of Gaudapada, who was the Guru of Shankaracharya ) established it. Kaivalyashrama traveled towards South India after visiting all the holy pilgrims in North India. After visiting Shankaranarayana kshetra, he enters a city called Soura in the beds of the river Shuktimati. Samantha, the king of the Soura region got influenced by the sage and donated his land for running ashrama there. Later the sage travels to Jalapura (Today's Neelavara), worships Ambika, makes all the arrangements for Nitya-pooja over there with the help of localities. Then through Brahmavara he enters the land of Balakudru and establishes this Shrimatha over there. Kaivalyashrama's Vrindavana is believed as exists in a lake called Mayagundi near Udupi which is considered as Aadi-Vrindavana of Shrimatha.

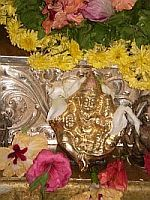
Shri Lakshmi Nrusimha
