= Kudupu =

Kudupu Kudpi
- Mangalore City Corporation
- Country: India
- State: Karnataka
- District: Dakshina Kannada

Languages
  - Native: Tulu language
- Time zone: UTC+5:30 (IST)
- PIN: 575028
- Telephone code: 0824
- Vehicle registration: KA-19

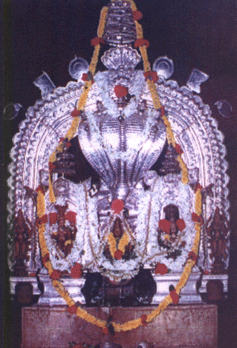
Kudupu Sri Anantha Padmanabha. Daily Pooja done by Madhwas

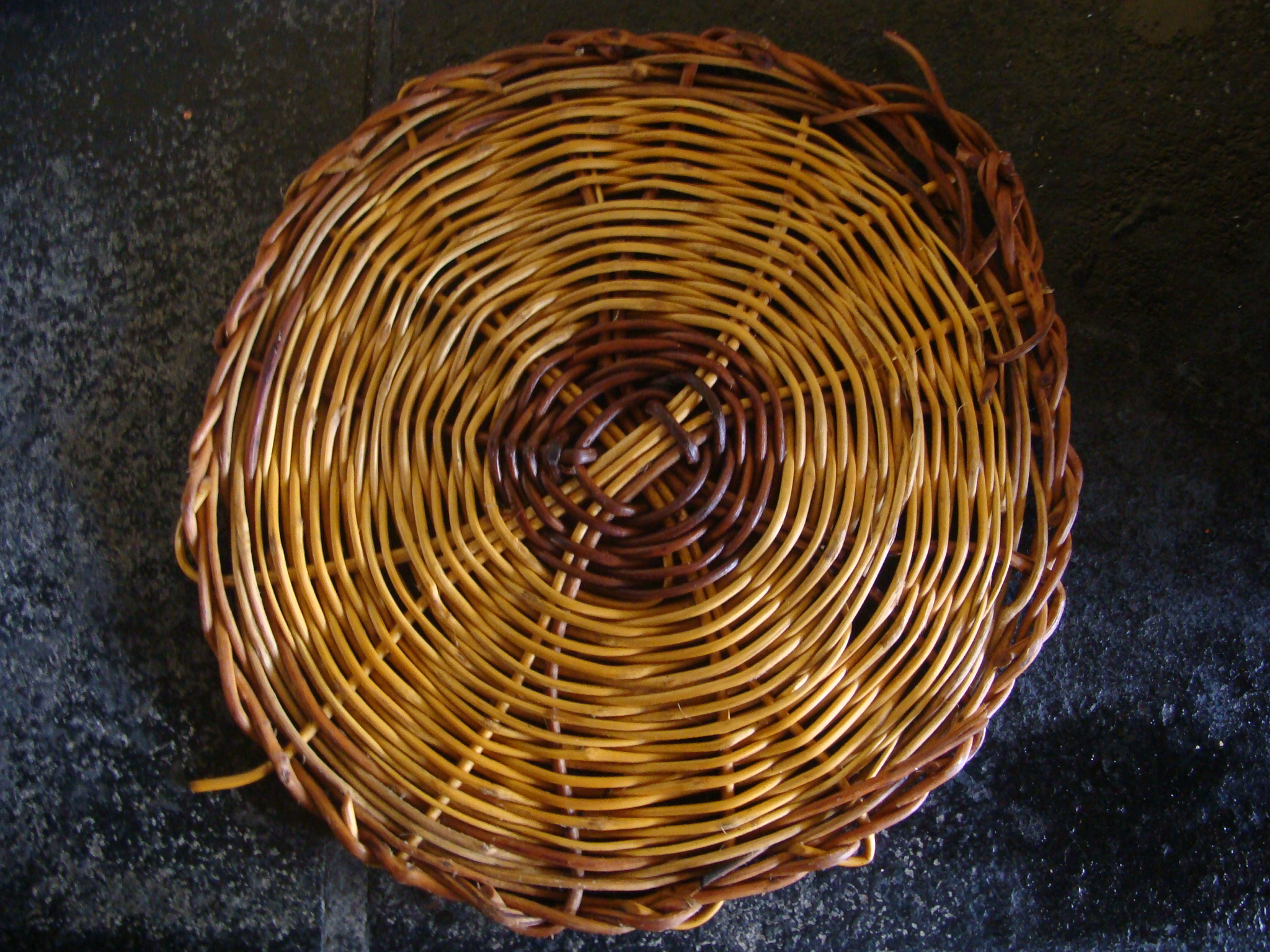
Kudupu - A handmade basket using dried wild creeper, used to drain water after boiling rice. Native to Mangalore region

Kudupu, also known as Kudpi, is a town in the Indian state of Karnataka, situated about 10 km from Mangalore city center, on the Mangalore-Moodabidri-Karkala route (NH#13).

Kudupu derives its name from a Tulu language word 'Kudupu' meaning a basket made out of a dried forest creeper which is used to drain water after boiling the rice. Native to coastal Karnataka region.

Kudupu is well known for its serpent temple, Sri Ananta Padmanabha Temple, one of the prominent Nāga-kshetra in the region.

Temple was under renovation from 2016 until February 2018. Brahmakalashotsava, a festival which marks the completion of renovation of a temple was held from 18 - 25 February 2018. This Brahmakalashotsava was termed as festival of the century in the history of the temple, as the renovation of a temple usually happens once in many hundred years.

== Kudupu Sri Ananthapadmanabha Temple ==
As the name of the temple suggests main deities are Ananthapadmanabha, Subrahmanya and Vasuki Nagaraja (Serpent God). It is worshipped by vasishnava sect, follower of Madhvacharya

=== Festivals ===
Following are some of the main festivals celebrated in the temple

- Subrahmanya Shashthi (ಸುಬ್ರಹ್ಮಣ್ಯ ಷಷ್ಠಿ) - In the month of November/December. Champa Shashthi.
- Kiru Shashthi (ಕಿರು ಷಷ್ಠಿ) - In the month of December/January. 6th day of Pushya Shuddha.
- Nagara Panchami (ನಾಗರ ಪಂಚಮಿ) - In the month of July/August. Shravana Shuddha Nagara Panchami.
- Annual Festival (ವಾರ್ಷಿಕ ಜಾತ್ರೆ) - In the month of December/January. From Margashira Shuddha Padya to Margashira Shuddha Shashti.
- Brahmakalashotsava (ಬ್ರಹ್ಮಕಲಶೋತ್ಸವ) - 18 February 2018 till 25 February 2018.

=== Temple Layout ===
Main deity Lord Anantha Padmanabha in the main sanctum, is faced towards west. Naga Bana (place of serpent deity) though situated in eastern portion of the temple it is also faced towards west. There are more than three hundred of Serpent Idols in this Naga Bana. Holy pond Bhadra Saraswathi Thirtha is situated left side of the temple. In front of the temple there is one small shrine dedicated to Sub-deity Jarandaya. Inside behind the main sanctum there lies Sub-deity Shree Devi and Lord Mahaganapathi in southern portion. A holy anthill situated inside the temple beside which there is a stone idol of Lord Subramanya and either side of the main sanctum there are stone idols dedicated to Jaya and Vijaya (statues of divine watchmen). Outside in front of the temple there lies one Valmika Mantapa either side of which there are Shrines of Ayyappan and Navagriha.

=== Deities and Sub-deities Of The Temple ===
- Ananta Padmanabha Devaru (ಅನಂತ ಪದ್ಮನಾಭ ದೇವರು)
- Naga Devaru (ನಾಗ ದೇವರು)
- Subrhmanya Devaru (ಸುಬ್ರಹ್ಮಣ್ಯ ದೇವರು)
- Shree Devi Ammanavaru (ಶ್ರೀ ದೇವಿ ಅಮ್ಮನವರು)
- Maha Ganapati Devaru (ಮಹಾ ಗಣಪತಿ ದೇವರು)
- Jarandaya Daiva (ಜಾರಂದಾಯ ದೈವ)
- Ayyappa Swamy (ಅಯ್ಯಪ್ಪ ಸ್ವಾಮಿ)
- Navagraha (ನವಗ್ರಹ)

=== Special Poojas and Celebrations in temple ===
- Ashada Hunnime (full moon day in Ashada Masa)
- Gokulashtami (Birth day of Lord Krishna)
- Gouri Tritiya Dina Navnana (Podwar)
- Vinayaka Chowthi
- Soura Righupakarma
- Anantha Chathurdhashi
- Navarathri
- Deepavali (Setting out of Bali)
- Tulasi pooja till Karthika Masa Uttana Dwadhashi and Ksheerabdhi on Dwadhashi day.
- Kartika Hunnime Deepotsava
- Maha Shivarathri Deepotsava
- Vishu Sankramana
- Vrishabha Masa Hunnime (Setting in of Bali)
- Four-day festival from Dhanurmasa Shuddha Chathurdhashi.
- Jarandaya Nema (ಜಾರಾಂದಾಯ ನೇಮ)
- Dompada Bali Nema (ದೊಂಪದ ಬಲಿ ನೇಮ)
- Beshada Bandi Nema (ಬೇಷದ ಬಂಡಿ ನೇಮ)

=== Offerings at The Temple (ಸೇವೆಗಳು) ===
List of sevas performed at the temple

- Naga Tambila (ನಾಗ ತಂಬಿಲ)
- Panchamritha Abhisheka (ಪಂಚಾಮೃತ ಅಭಿಷೇಕ)
- Ashlesha Bali (ಅಶ್ಲೇಷಾ ಬಲಿ)
- Ratriya Hoovina Pooje (ರಾತ್ರಿಯ ಹೂವಿನ ಪೂಜೆ)
- Madyahnada Hoovina Pooje (ಮಧ್ಯಾಹ್ನದ ಹೂವಿನ ಪೂಜೆ)
- Pancha Kajjaya (ಪಂಚಕಜ್ಜಾಯ)
- Karthika Pooje (ಕಾರ್ತಿಕ ಪೂಜೆ)
- Shashwatha Seve (ಶಾಶ್ವತ ಸೇವೆ)
- Shashwatha Annadana Seve (ಶಾಶ್ವತ ಅನ್ನದಾನ ಸೇವೆ)
- Sarpa Sanskara (ಸರ್ಪ ಸಂಸ್ಕಾರ)
- Naga Pratishte (ನಾಗ ಪ್ರತಿಷ್ಠೆ)
- Ashlesha Bali Udyapane (ಅಶ್ಲೇಷಾ ಬಲಿ ಉಧ್ಯಾಪನೆ)
- Ksheeraabhisheka (ಕ್ಷೀರಾಭಿಷೇಕ )
- Sahasra Namarchane (ಸಹಸ್ರನಾಮರ್ಚನೆ)
- Halu Payasa (ಹಾಲು ಪಾಯಸ)
- Purusha Sookta Abhisheka (ಪುರುಷ ಸೂಕ್ತ ಅಭಿಷೇಕ)
- Amruthapadi Nandadeepa (ಅಮೃತಪಡಿ ನಂದಾದೀಪ)
- Appa Kajjaya (ಅಪ್ಪ ಕಜ್ಜಾಯ)
- Pavamana Abhisheka (ಪವಮಾನ ಅಭಿಷೇಕ)
- Ondu Dinada Mahapooje (ಒಂದು ದಿನದ ಮಹಾಪೂಜೆ)
- Ayyappa SAmy Pooje (ಅಯ್ಯಪ್ಪ ಸ್ವಾಮಿ ಪೂಜೆ)
- Navagriha Pooje (ನವಗ್ರಹ ಪೂಜೆ)
- Navagriha Japa (ನವಗ್ರಹ ಜಪ - ಜಪ)
- Ashtotthara Archane (ಅಷ್ಟೋತ್ತರ ಅರ್ಚನೆ)

==== Ashlesha Bali ====
Ashlesha Bali is a Seva performed in the temple. It can be performed on all days except on Ekadashi and annual festival. This seva usually begins at 5:00 p.m. and end at around 6.30 p.m. On the day of Ashlesha Nakshaktra, due to large participation, the seva continues till 11pm. On that day a night meal is offered to the devotees and participants. Individual attention is given to the participants of the seva in this Kshetra.

=== Mythology (ಪುರಾಣ) ===
Once there was a Brahmin Vedic scholar called 'Kedar' who was very orthodox, kind and religious follower. But he was extremely worried of not having a child. Thinking of that the blessing of Saint is ultimate resort for having a child he wandered everywhere searching one such saint. Finally his search fructified when he came contacted with one such holy Saint called 'Shringa Muni' near a small river 'Bhadra Saraswathi Thirtha' in midst of a big forest. He prostrated before a saint and placed his reason for worries. Hearing this a saint told him to stay there and start penance regarding Lord Subramanya who would fulfill your wishes. Saint also detailed him about the holiness of that place and the river.

Kedar accepted the advice of the saint and stood there and started a rigorous penance regarding Lord Subramanya with great concentration of mind and devotion. In penance he forgot all about his surroundings and himself. It continued for many years. As his penance became so intense it created a sort of immense heat in the surrounding and it spread everywhere even up to heaven. Devatas, humans, animals found it very hard to sustain. Everybody began to worry about the future if it continues like this. Worried about his penance Devatas went to Satyaloka to see Lord Brahma and told him the situation. Thinking of that Lord Mahavishnu only could redress the problem Lord Brahma accompanied by Devatas met him and detailed him with all about the situation. Hearing this Lord Mahavishnu said that Kedar is meditating regarding Lord Subramanya and only he could give remedy to this problem. Lord Mahavishnu promised Brahma and Devatas that he will meet Subramanya and accordingly he met him and told that Kedar is meditating upon him with a single desire of having a child that could be fulfilled by him only. He also asked Lord Subramanya to appear before Kedar and bless him with a child. But Lord Subramanya told that there is no child in the fate of Kedar and he is eligible only for salvation. But on the request of Lord Mahavishnu, Subramanya appeared before Kedar and blessed him with children. Kedar is so happy and expecting a child he settled near that Bhadra Thirtha River itself duly meditating and worshiping Lord Subramanya.

After some day, Kedar's wife saw a serpent laying eggs and thought even snakes have good fortune of having children and worried too much about her fate comparing to that serpent. Year passed and Kedar's wife became pregnant and couple becomes very happy expecting a child. But after nine months, to their and everybody's surprise Kedar's wife delivered three eggs which was more looking like serpent eggs. Devatas thought these eggs are nothing but an incarnation of Lord Mahavishnu, Lord Mahashesha and Lord Subramanya and became very happy.

But Kedar was not happy. Even after rigorous penance if God blessed him with these eggs as children it is nothing but fate and a result of past action. That time he heard a divine voice coming from ether saying that these eggs are nothing but an incarnation of Lord Mahavishnu, Lord Mahashesha and Lord Subramanya for the sake of betterment of the world. It also realized him that he does not have further children and advised him to erect the eggs secretly at the place where he did penance upon Lord Subramanya. It blessed a place and River as a holy spot and whoever takes bath in the river will be blessed with children and freed from all sickness and sin. A divine voice also advised him to stay in that holy place worshiping Lord Anantha Padmanabha (another name of Lord Mahavishnu) and blessed him with salvation at the end of his life.

Hearing this voice Kedar became so happy and he kept those eggs in a basket weaved with forest creeps called Kudupu in local language and kept secretly in the place where he meditated upon Lord Subramanya. He spent his rest of life meditating upon Lord Anantha Padmanabha and attained salvation at the end of his life. Now in that place an anthill was grown and the place is well known as Shree Kshetra Kudupu. A small river called Bhadra Saraswathi Thirtha resides near the temple itself.

=== Legend regarding construction of the temple ===
Once a King named Shurasena did some wrong action and the sin caused by the act humiliated him very much and he lost his peace of mind. He asked different Vedic scholars, priests for the remedy of how to come out of this sin. But Brahmin Vedic scholars told him to cut down his hands himself, as the very cause of the sin was his hands only and advised him to worship upon Lord Mahavishnu. King accepted the advice and did accordingly. He made two golden arms and adorned it in place of his lost hands. But even though of his atonement he was very much worried about his lost hands.

One day while he was a hunting animal in wild along with his army men he reached the holy and peaceful spot of Bhadra Saraswathi Thirtha. He was very much impressed by the peaceful atmosphere of the surrounding of the Bhadra Thirtha. He was surprised by seeing the relics of pooja done near Thirtha. Meantime he remembered the advice given by Brahmin Vedic Scholars about the worship to be made to Lord Mahavishnu. Then he settled there and started to worship Lord Mahavishnu. As he intensely worshipped, Lord Mahavishnu appeared before him and inquired about his wants. King requested for restoration of his lost arms. By hearing this Lord Mahavishnu told him to build one temple within a day itself and his arms will be replaced as son as construction of temple completes.

King Shurasena became very happy and become ready to construct a temple within a day. All the sculptors, architects got in construction work. The work even continued in night and the dawn was nearing while the temple was almost all in finishing stage except the ornamental top portion of the sanctum. Early morning an ethereal divine voice came from the sky advising to stop the construction work as and where it is. King looked at his shoulder and alas!! his arms became, as it was earlier to the complete restoration. King settled there and spent his rest of the life ardently worshipping upon Lord Mahavishnu. Even today the temple does not have 'Muguli' (ಮುಗುಳಿ - ornamental top portion on the sanctum).

== Places of interest ==
- Ajjina Saana, Kudupu (ಅಜ್ಜಿನ ಸಾನ, ಕುಡುಪು)
- Kudupu Katte (ಕುಡುಪು ಕಟ್ಟೆ)
- St. Joseph the Worker Church, Vamanjoor (ಸಂತ ಶ್ರಮಿಕ ಜೋಸೆಫರ ಇಗರ್ಜಿ, ವಾಮಂಜೂರು)
- Kudupu Vividoddesha Sahakari Sangha (ಕುಡುಪು ವಿವಿದೋದ್ದೇಶ ಸಹಕಾರಿ ಸಂಘ)
- Mitra Mandali, Kudupu (ಮಿತ್ರ ಮಂಡಳಿ, ಕುಡುಪು)
- Pilikula Nisargadhama (ಪಿಲಿಕುಳ ನಿಸರ್ಗಧಾಮ)
- Shri Amrutheshwara Temple, Kettikal (ಶ್ರೀ ಅಮೃತೇಶ್ವರ ಟೆಂಪಲ್, ಕೆತ್ತಿಕಲ್)

== Nearby Locations ==
- Vamanjoor (ವಾಮಂಜೂರು)
- Kulashekara (ಕುಲಶೇಖರ)
- Mudushedde (ಮೂಡುಶೆಡ್ಡೆ)
- Polali (ಪುರಲ್)
- Gurupura (ಗುರುಪುರ)

== Educational Institutes ==
- Government Primary School Kudupu (ಸರಕಾರಿ ಹಿರಿಯ ಪ್ರಾಥಮಿಕ ಶಾಲೆ, ಕುಡುಪು)
- St. Joseph The Worker Primary School Vamanjoor (ಸಂತ ಶ್ರಮಿಕ ಜೋಸೆಫರ ಹಿರಿಯ ಪ್ರಾಥಮಿಕ ಶಾಲೆ, ವಾಮಂಜೂರು)
- St. Raymond's High School Vamanjoor (ಸಂತ ರೇಮಂಡರ ಪ್ರೌಢ ಶಾಲೆ, ವಾಮಂಜೂರು)
- St. Raymond's Educational Institutes, Vamanjoor
- Mangala Jyothi (ಮಂಗಳ ಜ್ಯೋತಿ)
- Dharma Jyothi
- St. Joseph Engineering College, Vamanjoor
- Karavali College of Pharmacy
