= Bangalore Munivenkatappa =

Bangalore Munivenkatappa was a building contractor in the pre-independence era of Indian history. He was born on 12 August 1888 and was majorly based in the Karnataka state. He built many prominent landmarks in his time (prominent among them being Lalitha Mahal, T.Narsipur bridge). He was also involved in the construction of the Mysore Palace. The British honored him with the title of 'Rao Sahib' in 1937.

Lalitha Mahal Palace was designed by E.W.Fritchley and constructed by Munivenkatappa in 1931 at a cost of Rs. 1300,000.

Other than the Lalitha Mahal Palace, Munivenkatappa constructed the bridges on Kabini and T. Narsipur. In Bangalore, he constructed the Vani Vilas Hospital.

Munivenkatappa bought the gardens and the town house (Royal House) that belonged to the Raja of Ramnad on West Cott Road, Royapettah, Chennai, in the 1930s to establish the first Woodlands Hotel. In 1931, the hotel staged the annual conference of the prestigious Chennai Music Academy and after Indian Independence Rajaji gave a tea party at the same hotel. Later, an air-conditioned open-air theatre was constructed in the same gardens by the name Woodlands - Symphony. Even today, the hotel remains with the main building (almost hundred years old) in the middle of sprawling grounds and surrounded by massive trees. The Hotel is now known as Old Woodlands or Royapettah Woodlands, but people often confuse this hotel with the New Woodlands Hotel in Dr. Radhakrishnan Road, which was established by Krishna Rao who once leased this Woodlands in 40s.

In Mysore another famous movie theater named Woodlands, functions till day. Munivenkatappa started the first granite factory in India at Bangalore and named it "Narayanaswamy & Sons". Polished stones were imported/exported to foreign countries from this factory.

In 1947, he bought a building in Curzon Park Road, Mysore and renamed it as "Woodlands Picture House" and had it rebuilt in classical European architecture in 1947. This Movie house was once frequented by the Mysore Royal family and had a special viewing balcony built for them. He bought a nearby hostel and converted it to Greens Hotel.
