= Koteshwara =

Koteshwara Sumangala
- Town
- Location in Karnataka, India Koteshwara (India)
- Coordinates: 13.607°N 74.75°E
- Country: India
- State: Karnataka
- District: Udupi
- Elevation: 36.447 m (119.58 ft)

Population (2011)
  - Total: 14,697

Languages
  - Official: Kannada
- Time zone: UTC+5:30 (IST)
- PIN: 576222
- Telephone code: 08254
- Vehicle registration: KA-20

Koteshwara is a historic town located in the Kundapur taluk of Udupi district in the Indian state of Karnataka. It is renowned for its religious significance, cultural heritage, and vibrant festivals. This place is known as one of the Seven Mukti Sthalas founded by Sage Parashurama. The other six are Udupi, Kollur, Subrahmanya, Kumbasi, Sankaranarayana and Gokarna). The town also has another historic name as Dhwajapura.

Religious and Cultural Significance The town is home to the ancient Kotilingeshwara Temple, dedicated to Lord Shiva. Legends say that a million wise people came to the place and did penance to Lord Shiva. The Lord showed up before each of them because he was so happy with how much they cared. So, the place became known as Kotee-Ishwara, which later changed to Koteshwara. Locals believe that the present temple was built by Pandavas, no doubt it looks ancient and one of the architectural wonders. But a few shila-shashana (stone-charters) in the area connects the temple to rulers of Basrur.

Kotiteertha A large lake of 4 acres (16,000 m2), called Kotiteertha, is located near the temple. Local legends suggest that the lake has an underground tunnel connecting it to another historic place called Vandaru Kambala Gadde, located about 20 km away.

Kodi Habba Festival One of the major attractions in Koteshwara is the annual Kodi Habba festival, held at the Kotilingeshwara Temple during November or December. This grand fair draws lakhs of devotees from Karnataka and neighboring states. The festival features the pulling of a massive chariot (Brahmaratha) on the temple street, in a huge procession accompanied by folk dances, music, and fireworks.

As per a legend, Maharaja Vasu of Basrur was married but had no children for many years. Hoping to have a child, he promised to build a temple in Koteshwar if his wish came true. Eventually, he was blessed with children. To fulfill his vow, he built the temple. However, since the temple’s chariot (Brahma Ratha) wasn't ready in time, he had one made from bamboo and sugarcane bagasse instead. The Kodi Habba festival is celebrated in memory of this event. So, even today, here is a unique tradition of newly married couples worshiping the deity, and taking home a pair of sugarcane, believed to bless them with healthy children.

The town has a Pattabhi Ramachandra and Mariamma temple as well.

== Demographics ==
According to the 2011 Census, Koteshwara had a population of 10,229, of which 4,887 are males while 5,342 are females. Literacy rate of Koteshwar city is 86.41 % higher than state average of 75.36 %. In Koteshwar, Male literacy is around 91.52 % while female literacy rate is 81.78 %.

== Notable people ==
Koteshwara is the birthplace of renowned Indian actor and director Upendra Rao, known for his work in Kannada cinema.

== Accessibility ==
The town is well-connected by road to Kundapur, located just 4 km away. Frequent bus services are available between the two towns. The nearest major city is Udupi, approximately 33.8 km away, and the closest airport is in Mangalore, about 85 km from Koteshwara.

== See also ==
- Basrur
- Kundapur
- Barkur
- List of temples in Tulunadu
- Koteshwara Brahmin
