= Talipady =

- village
- Location in Karnataka, India Talipady (India)
- Coordinates: 12.87°N 74.84°E
- Country: India
- State: Karnataka
- District: Dakshina Kannada
- Talukas: Mangalore

Government
  - Type: Town panchayat
  - Body: Kinnigoli

Population (2001)
  - Total: 6,498

Languages
  - Official: Kannada
- Time zone: UTC+5:30 (IST)
- ISO 3166 code: IN-KA
- Vehicle registration: KA
- Website: karnataka.gov.in

Talipady is a village in the southern state of Karnataka, India. It is located in the Mangalore taluk of Dakshina Kannada district in Karnataka.

== Demographics ==
As of 2001 India census, Talipady had a population of 6498 with 2927 males and 3571 females.

== See also ==
- Dakshina Kannada
- Districts of Karnataka
