= Mudushedde =

- village
- Location in Karnataka, India
- Coordinates: 12.93°N 74.88°E
- Country: India
- State: Karnataka
- District: Dakshina Kannada
- City: Mangalore

Population (2001)
  - Total: 7,426

Languages
  - Official: Tulu, Kannada
- Time zone: UTC+5:30 (IST)

Mudushedde is a village within Mangalore city in Dakshina Kannada district in the Indian state of Karnataka.

== Demographics ==
As of 2001 India census, Mudushedde had a population of 7426. Males constitute 48% of the population and females 52%. Mudushedde has an average literacy rate of 73%, higher than the national average of 59.5%: male literacy is 78%, and female literacy is 68%. In Mudushedde, 12% of the population is under 6 years of age.
