= Kumble =

Kumble may refer to:

- Anil Kumble (born 1970), an Indian cricketer
- Anna Kumble (born 1978), British pop singer also known as Lolly
- Roger Kumble (born 1966), American writer and film director
- Kanipura Sri Gopalakrishna Temple Kumble

== See also ==
- Kumbla, also spelled Kumble, a town in Kerala, India
- Kumble R. Subbaswamy, university administrator
- Kumble N. Umesh, Cognizant Technology Solutions
