= Kunjarugiri =

Kunjarugiri Temple
- village
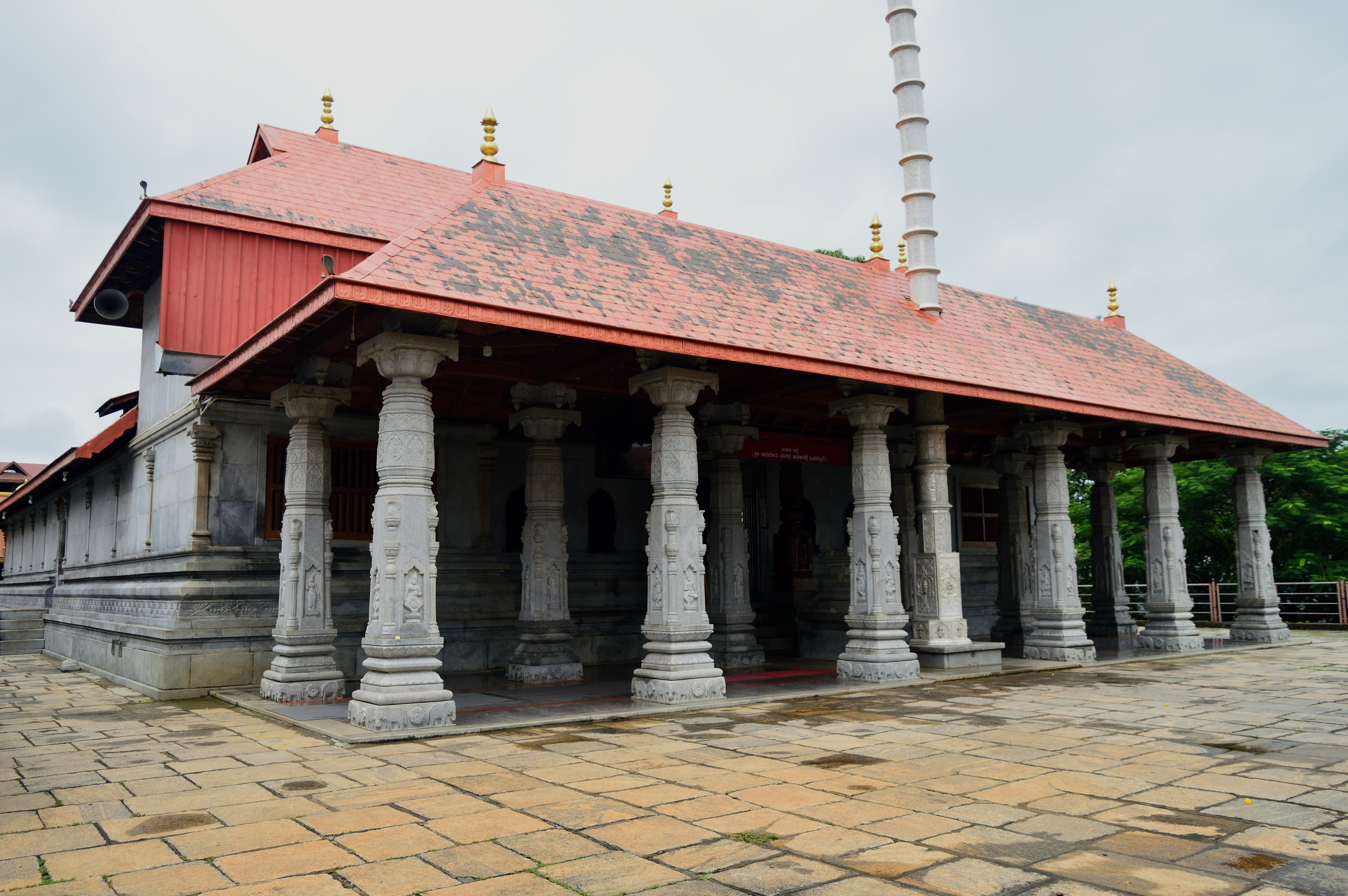
- Main entrance of temple
- Country: India
- State: Karnataka

Languages
  - Official: Kannada
- Time zone: UTC+5:30 (IST)
- PIN: 576120
- Vehicle registration: KA 20

Kunjarugiri is a village in Udupi district in the Indian state of Karnataka. It is located about 11 kilometres (6.8 mi) from Udupi City, near Shankarapura. The main attraction of the village is a hill, known as Durga Betta, on which stands a temple of Durga, known to locals in the Tulu language as Kunjar Amma. Parashurama is credited with erecting the temple in honour of the divine mother, Adi Shakti. It is said that when he created Kerala, he found in the depth of the sea a pearl, which he fashioned into a nose ring and decorated the idol of Kunjaru Amma with. According to legend, however, the sea always retrieves whatever is taken from it. To protect the idol for a long time, Parashurama installed the idol on the Kunjaru hill; but to this day, the sea keeps coming closer to the hill. The hill comprises nearly 250–300 stairs as a pathway leading to the Kunjarugiri temple. Thousands of school children visit every year as a part of the school trips. Foreign tourists also visit the place Udupi which stands on the Konkan coast. During Krishna Janmashtami (the day lord Krishna was born), thousands of visitors are seen in the streets of Udupi.

Sri Madhvacharya, the founder of the Dvaita school of philosophy, used to visit the Durga temple every day during his childhood. One day, when he was in the Kunjaru temple, his mother called from Pajaka, a kilometre or two away; Madhavacharya is believed to have jumped straight to his house. To this day, his footprints can be seen on a particular rock. The rock is found in a cave and the foot-prints are worshiped by the purohits of the temple. Around the hill, there are four ponds or 'thirthas' that were visited by Sri Madhva every day. The four ponds are called Dhanus Thirtha, Gada Thirtha, Bana Thirtha and Parashu Thirtha.
