= Shankaranarayana =

Shankaranarayana Golikatte
- Village
- Location in Karnataka, India
- Coordinates: 13.605822°N 74.860192°E
- Country: India
- State: Karnataka

Government
  - Body: Gram panchayat

Languages
  - Official: Kannada
- Time zone: UTC+5:30 (IST)
- ISO 3166 code: IN-KA
- Vehicle registration: KA-20
- Website: karnataka.gov.in

Shankaranarayana is a village in Kundapura taluk of Udupi district in the state of Karnataka in India known for the Shankaranarayana Temple, a pilgrimage site and one of the seven Muktikshetras (Places of Liberation) of coastal Karnataka. It is situated in midst of coconut and arecanut plantations along with forests adjoining western ghats. Earlier this village was called as Golikatte.

== History ==
The history of Shankaranayana goes back to ancient times because the temple is said to be constructed on water ( or on a lake ) by ancient people. The previous name of the Village was Golikatte, but because of the temple dedicated to the Gods Shankara and Narayana, the village name was changed to Shankaranarayana. Shanakaranarayana temple is the main landmark of the village along with Sri Veera kallukutika temple which has devotees from all around the district of Shivamoga, North Kannada, Udupi, Mangalore, and even from North Karnataka. Shankarnaryana is considered one among Seven Punya Kshetra's of Parshurama Kshetra or Parashurama land (Tulunadu) others being Gokarna, Kollur, Koteshwara, Kumbasi, Udupi and Kukke Subramanya.

== Shankaranarayana Temple ==
The Shankaranarayana Temple is a 11th - 12th century temple dedicated to Shankaranarayana, a syncretic Hindu deity representing the union of Shankara (Shiva or Hara) and Narayana (Vishnu or Hari), embodying the unity of Shaivism and Vaishnavism. It is one of the Muktikshetras (Places of Liberation) of Coastal Karnataka, traditionally believed to have been established by the sage Parashurama. The temple received patronage and grants from the Vijayanagara Empire and later the Nayakas of Keladi.

== Culture ==
The annual fair held every year on 16 January attracts large numbers of people from surrounding villages. Shankara (Hara) and Narayana (Hari) are jointly worshipped here and there are five Shankaranarayana temples within a radius of about 15 kilometers.

== Modern facilities ==
This village has facilities such as a Kinder Garden, Primary School, High school, college, Computer Institute are educational facilities. Government Hospital, Petrol Bunk. Nationalised Bank and Co-operative banks, clinics and Primary Health Centre(PHC), Police Station, Sub Registrar Office office, Veterinary Hospital, Oil Mills are all there catering to the needs of Rural People. The place is well connected to Kundapura, Udupi (district centre), Shimoga (Neighboring District) and Kollur (important pilgrimage centre). This village may be dubbed as Pensioners' retreat!

== Education facilities ==
Shankaranarayana has a primary school that is more than one hundred years old. Now the village also has an English Medium Primary school extended to high school and pre-university courses, First Grade College, Computer Education Centre, Typewriting School,

== Economy ==
The main livelihood of villagers is agriculture, with coconut, paddy, areca nut, pepper, cashew, and recently rubber being main crops. Besides agriculture, people find their lively hood in the Hotel business, Petrol bunks, Hotels & restaurants, Ice cream factory and Parlor, Grocery Shops, and Home Industries are also located in the village
