= Masala dosa =

Variant of South Indian food dosa

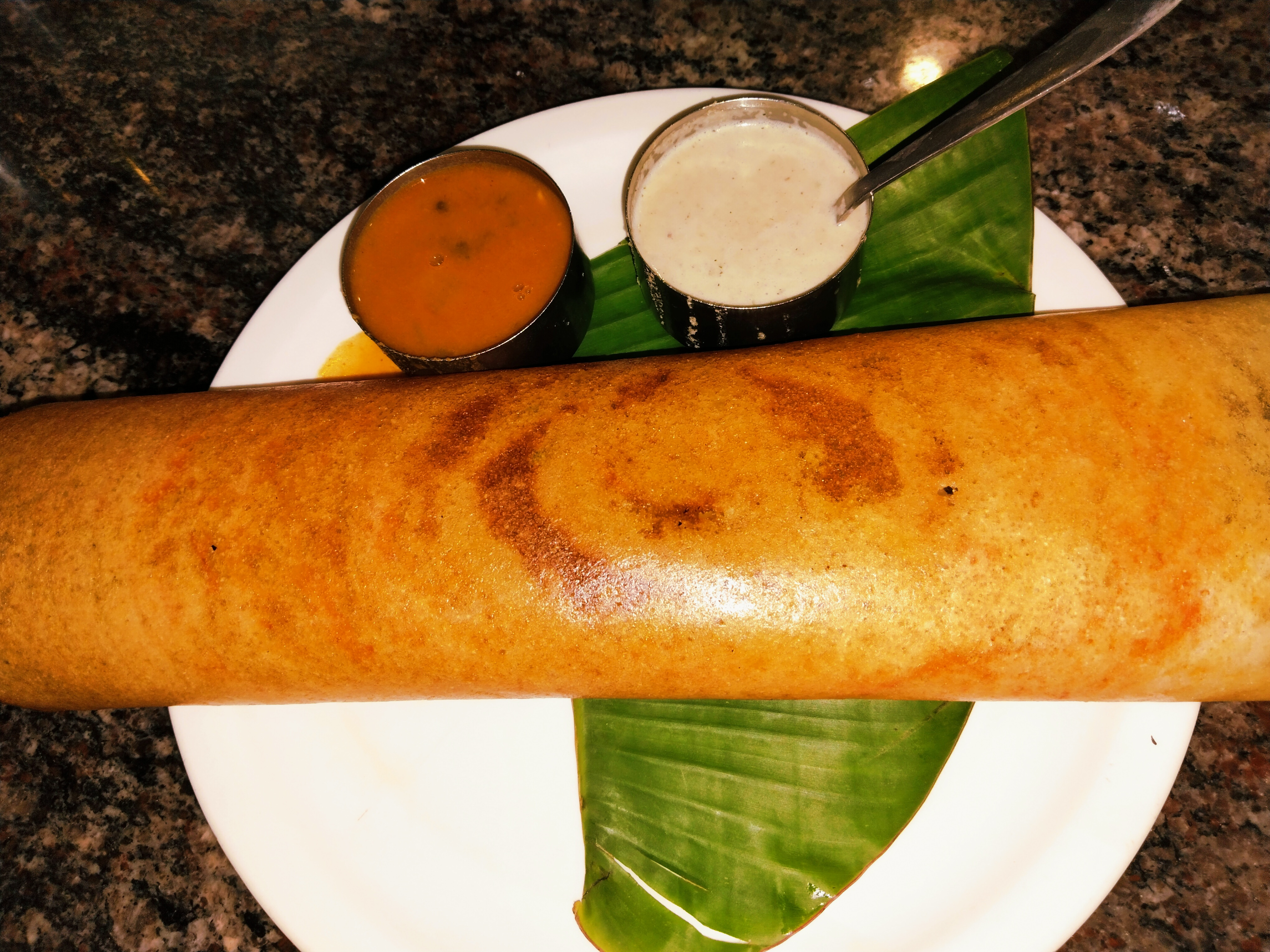
- Masala dosa served with coconut chutney and sambar
- Alternative names: Masale Dose
- Type: Dosa
- Course: Chutney, sambar, potato curry
- Region or state: South India
- Serving temperature: Hot
- Main ingredients: Fermented batter of rice and various legumes (black gram, pigeon pea, chickpea), various spices (fenugreek, red chili)
- Variations: rava masala dosa, onion masala dosa, paper masala dosa

Masala dosa (Tamil: மசாலா தோசை, masala dhōsai, Kannada: ಮಸಾಲೆ ದೋಸೆ, masāle dōse) is a dish of South India, consisting of a savoury dosa crepe stuffed with a spiced potato stir fry. It is a popular breakfast item in South India, though it can be served at all times of the day and found in many other parts of the country and overseas.

== History ==
The dish was created and popularized in Madras (now Chennai) during the 1930s by K. Krishna Rao, a restaurateur who operated the popular Udupi style hotel called Sri Krishna Vilas Hotel on Mount Road and later the New Woodlands Hotel, both pioneers of Udupi cuisine. Rao is also regarded as the dish's creator.

One tale attributes it to the cooks of Someshvara III, King of Mysore (1126–1138), who combined leftover curry with dosas. However, while the Manasollasa compiled during his reign does mention a dosa-like dish called dosaka, potatoes are a New World plant not introduced to India until the arrival of the Portuguese in the 16th century.

== Preparation ==
While there is variation in the recipe from town to town, the basic recipe typically starts with a batter of parboiled rice, poha, and various legumes (black gram, pigeon peas, chickpeas), and incorporates various spices for flavour, such as fenugreek and dry red chilli. The rice and legumes are fermented by soaking them overnight in water, then ground into a batter. To make the dosa, the batter is spread on a hot tava griddle using a ladle or a bowl. It is pan-roasted until crispy, filled with potato curry, and served with chutneys, and sambar. One common variant is the paper masala dosa, which is made with a thinner batter, resulting in a crisper, almost paper-thin final product.

== Variations ==
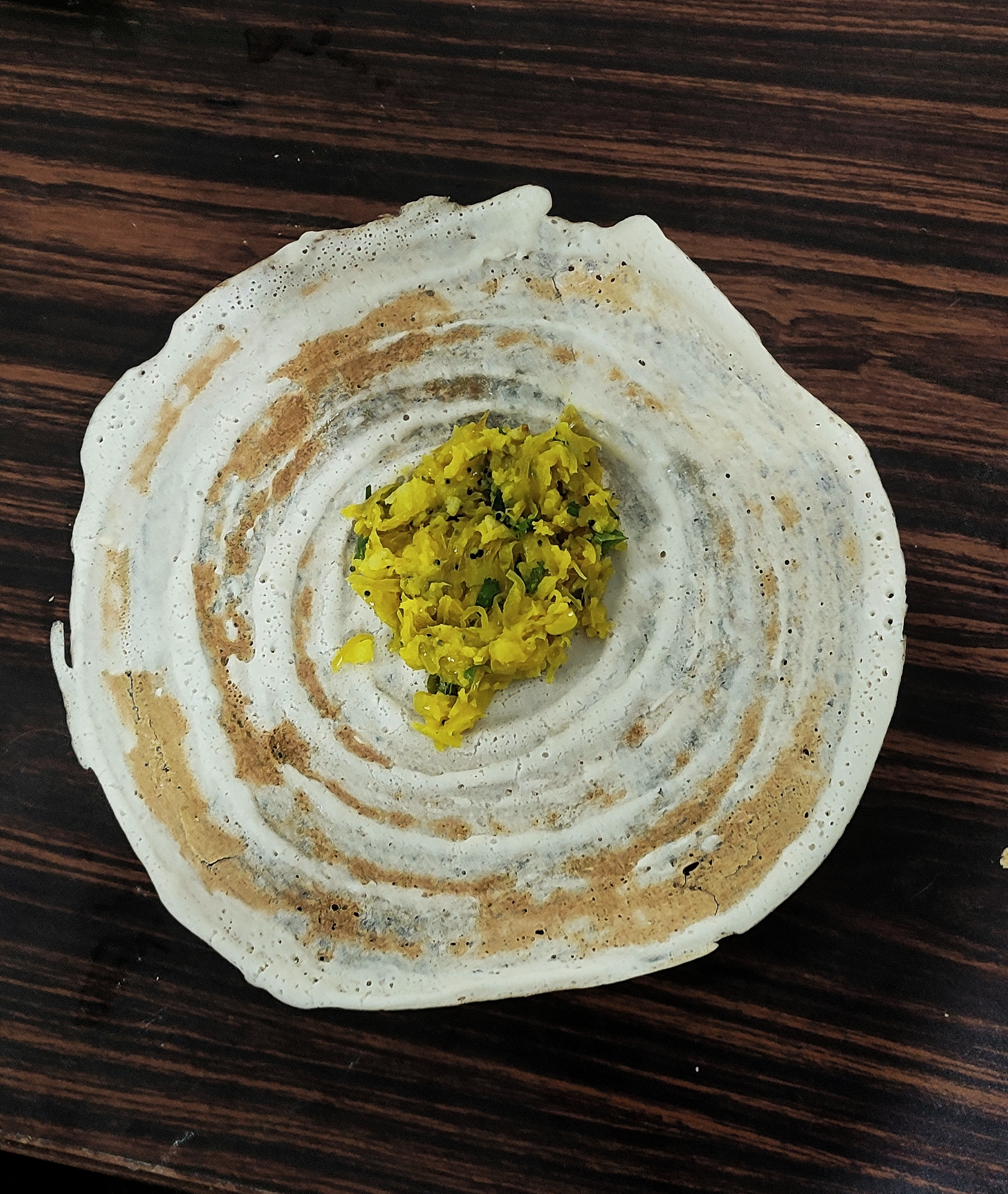
Masala dosa before folding, showing the potato curry filling

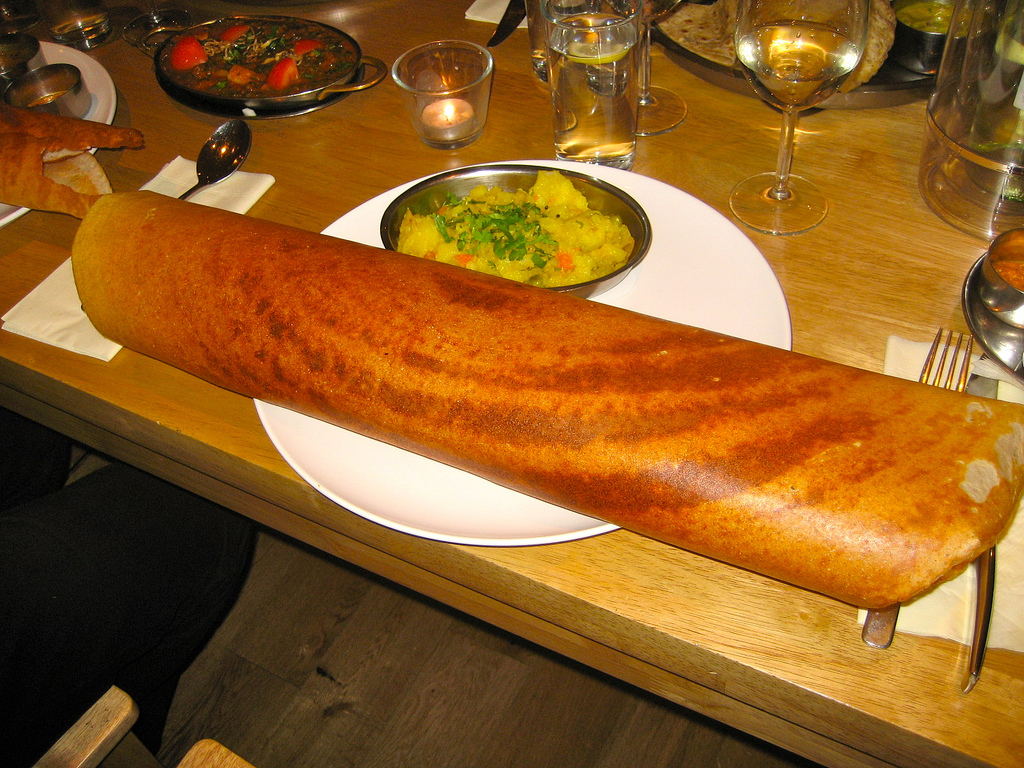
Paper masala dosa

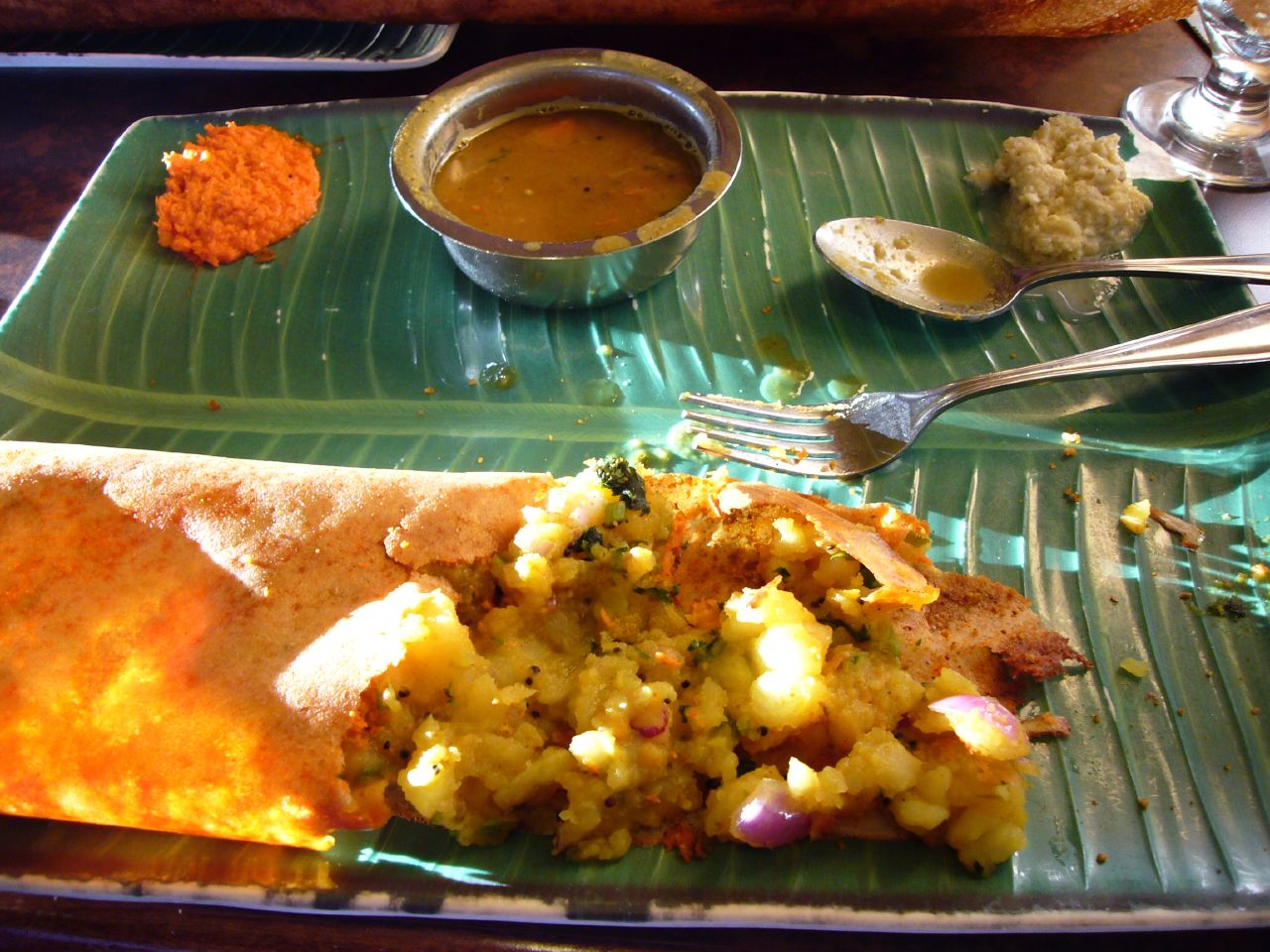
Madras special masala dosa

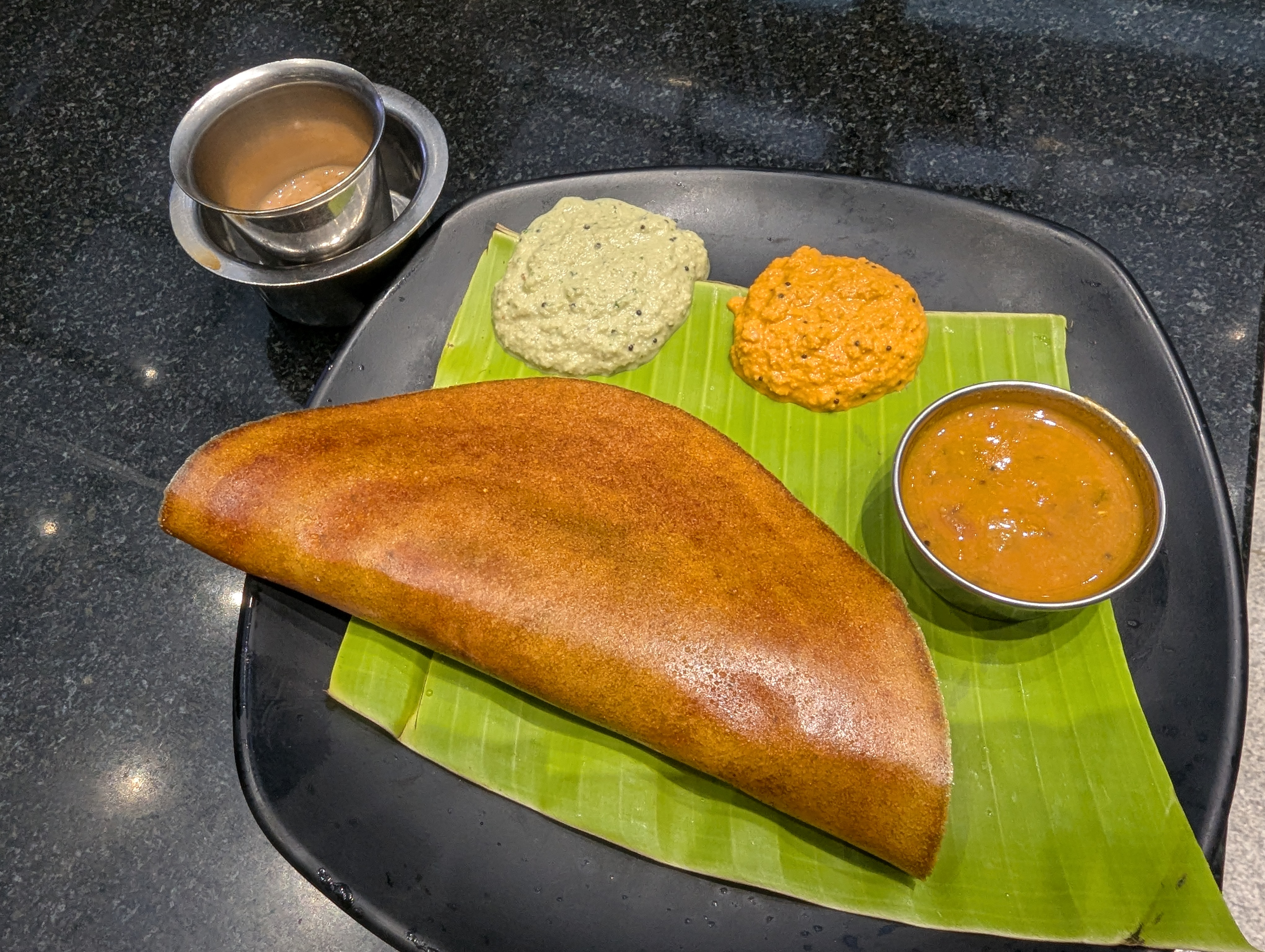
Karnataka-style masala dosa

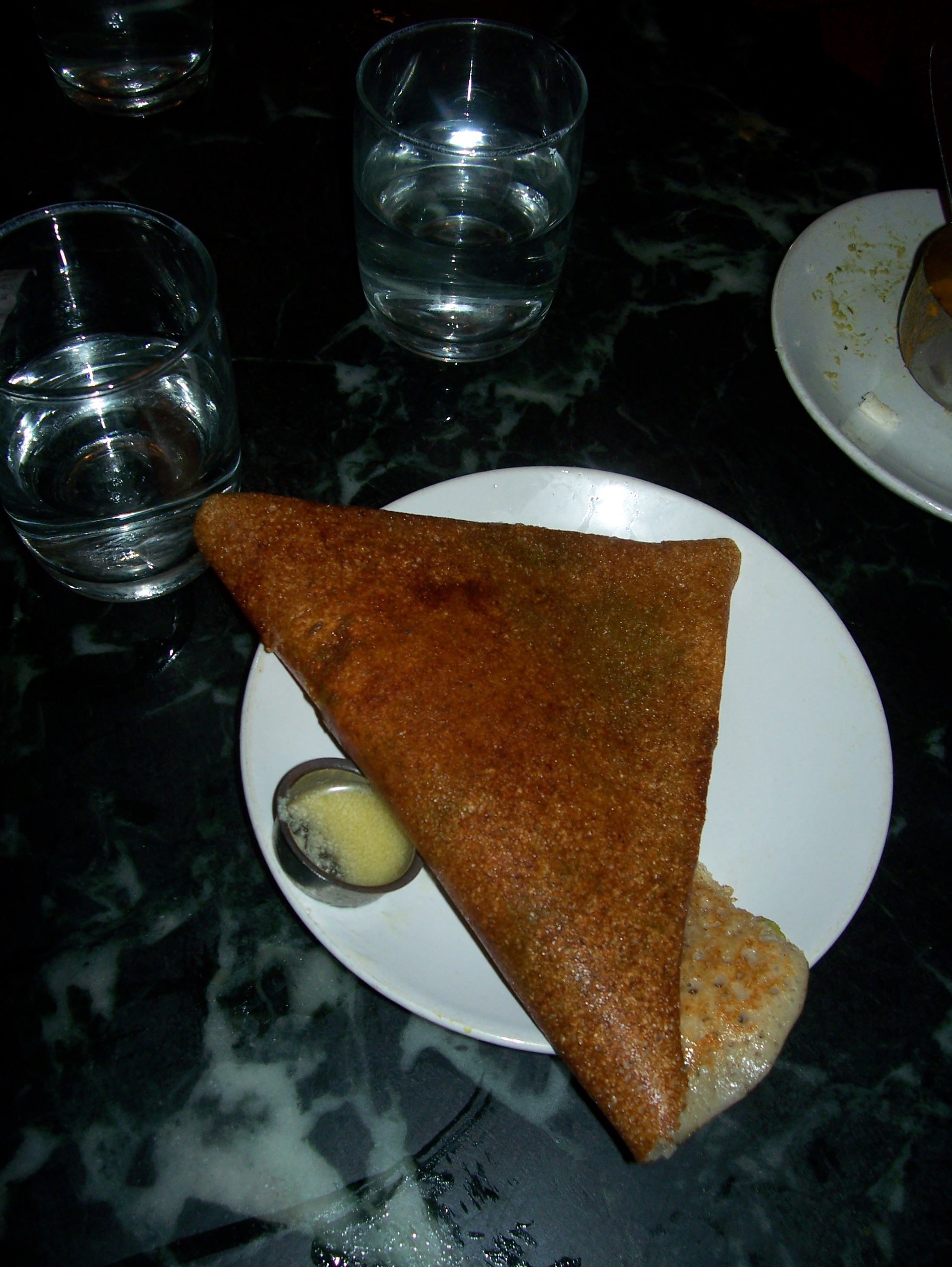
MTR masala dosa
