= Karinjeshwara Temple =

Temple in India

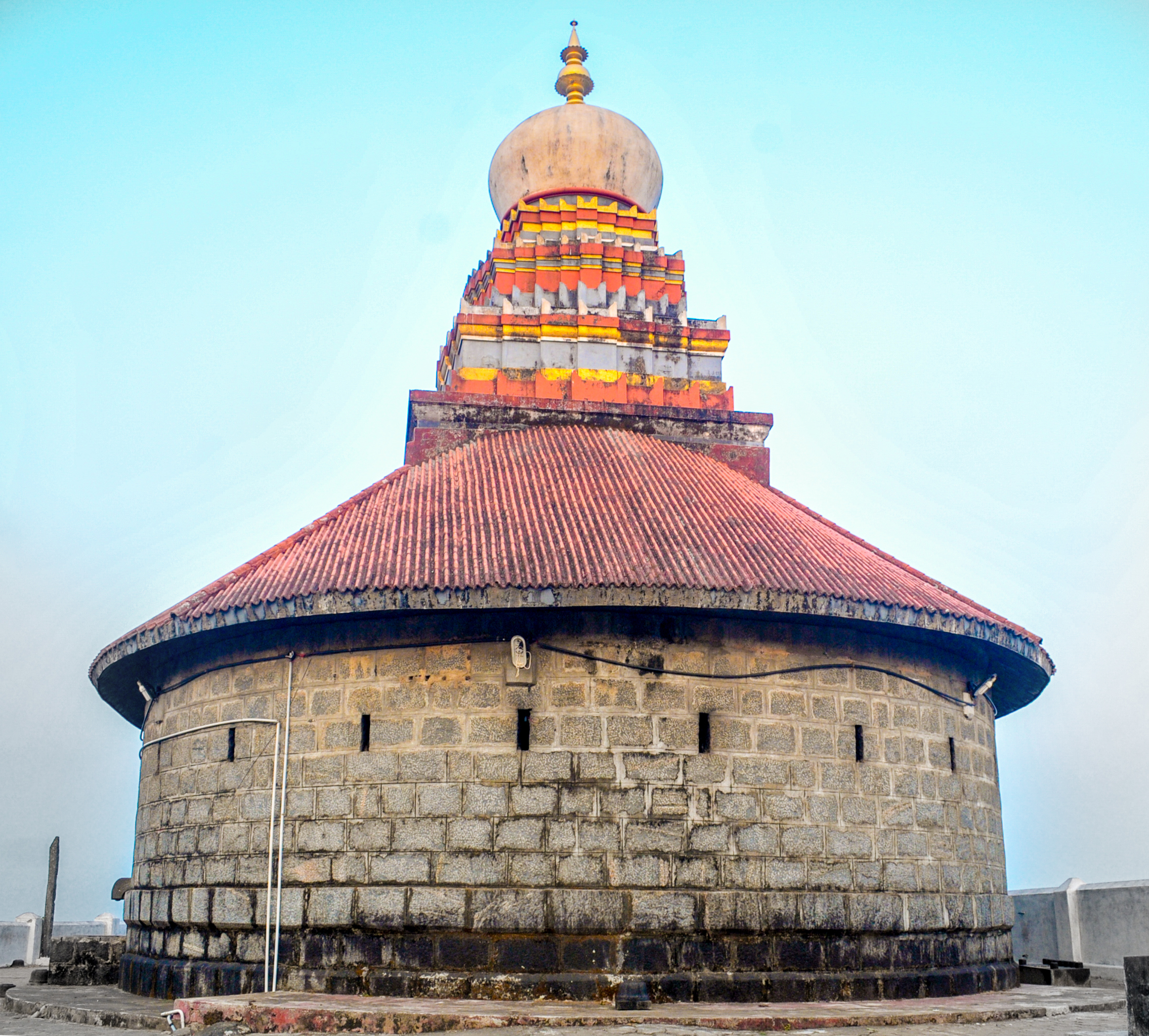
- Karinjeshwara Temple

- Location in Karnataka

Religion
- Affiliation: Hinduism
- District: Dakshina Kannada
- Deity: Shiva, (Parvathi-Parameshwra)
- Festivals: Maha Shivaratri, Car festival, Shiva- Parvathi sammilan, Navaratri, Deepotsava, Sona samaradhane, Aati Amavasya

Location
- Location: Bantwala
- State: Karnataka
- Interactive map of Karinjeshwara Temple
- Coordinates: 12.91420°N 75.05960°E

Architecture
- Completed: 1200 C.E.

Website
- rcmysore-portal.kar.nic.in/temples/KarinjeshwaraTemple/History.html/

Sri Karinjeshwara Temple (Kannada : ಕಾರಿಂಜೇಶ್ವರ Kārin̄jēśvara) is Hindu Temple, a famous Lord Shiva temple located Karinja in Bantwala Taluk, Kavalamudur Village, Dakshina Kannada, Karnataka, India. This temple is situated on the peak of Karinja Hill, about 1000 feet above sea level in Kodyamale hills, Karinjeshwara.

There are about 600 steps to reach this temple. This temple has two parts- one is lord Shiva is on the top of a cliff and the other is for the Goddess Parvati and Lord Ganesha in the middle of the way to the hill. There are ponds named Gadha teertha at hill bottom, Ungusta theerta at hill middle.

== Karinja Dadda ==
This Karinja hill is inhabited by simians (monkeys) and they are well revered here. Every day after noon a Naivedya, or food offering (mainly of rice in this case), is placed on a special large rectangular stone platform in front of the Shiva temple where the monkeys feast the food.

This specialty of offering to the monkey is called the Vanara(Monkey) anna(rice) Seva. The leader of congress of the simian group, generally called Karinja Dadda, takes the first bite.
