= Thokur =

Thokur 10th Thokur
- village
- Country: India
- State: Karnataka
- District: Dakshina Kannada

Government
  - Body: Mangalore City Corporation

Population (2011)
  - Total: 2,898

Languages
  - Official: Tulu, Urdu, Kannada, Byari, English
- Time zone: UTC+5:30 (IST)
- ISO 3166 code: IN-KA
- Vehicle registration: KA
- Website: karnataka.gov.in

Thokur (Thokur-(10), Thokuru, or Thokooru in Tulu) is a village located in Mangalore Taluk of Dakshina Kannada district in Karnataka. Around 448 families reside in Thokur-(10) village. Thokur-(10) village is administered by Grama Panchayath whose members are elected every five years generally.
