= Sri Parashakthi Kshetra =

Temple

Coordinates: 13.2705°N 75.3414°E

Location of Sri Parashakthi Temple, Madyar

Sri Parashakthi Kshetra (Kannada: ಶ್ರೀ ಪರಾಶಕ್ತಿ ಕ್ಷೇತ್ರ, ಮಡ್ಯಾರು), a temple complex at Madyar, Kotekar. Madyar, located around 20 km from Mangalore, the port city of Karnataka, India where the Hindu goddess Vaishnavi is worshiped as the presiding deity.
