= Kadandale =

- village
- Location in Karnataka, India Kadandale (India)
- Coordinates: 13°07′N 74°55′E
- Country: India
- State: Karnataka
- District: Dakshina Kannada

Languages
  - Official: Kannada
- Time zone: UTC+5:30 (IST)
- PIN: 574226
- Nearest city: Mangalore

Kadandale is a village in Dakshina Kannada district of Karnataka state, India.

== Geography ==
- According to Census 2011 information the location code or village code of Kadandale village is 574227. Kadandale village is located in Mangalore Tehsil of Dakshina Kannada district in Karnataka, India. It is situated 49 km away from Mangalore, which is both district & sub-district headquarter of Kadandale village. As per 2009 stats, Palladka is the gram panchayat of Kadandale village. The total geographical area of village is 1466.01 hectares. Kadandale has a total population of 3,760 peoples. There are about 850 houses in Kadandale village. Mudbidri is nearest town to Kadandale which is approximately 15 km away. Population
