= National Highway 66 (India) =

North–south high-capacity road

National Highway 66
- Map of the National Highway in red

Route information
- Part of AH20
- Length: 1,640 km (1,020 mi)

Major junctions
- North end: NH 48 in Panvel, MH
- NH 166 in Ratnagiri, MH; NH 166E in Guhagar, MH; NH 548H in Banda, MH; NH 748 in Panjim, GA; NH 52 in Ankola, KA; NH 766E in kumta,KA; NH 69 in Honnavar, KA; NH 75 in Mangaluru, KA; SH 30 in Thalassery, KL; NH 766 / NH 966 in Kozhikode, KL; NH 966A / NH 544 / NH 966B / NH 85 in Kochi, KL; NH 183 / NH 744 in Kollam, KL
- South end: NH 44 in Kanyakumari, TN

Location
- Country: India
- States: Maharashtra: 475 km (295 mi); Goa: 137 km (85 mi); Karnataka: 294 km (183 mi); Kerala: 678 km (421 mi); Tamil Nadu: 56 km (35 mi)

Highway system
- Roads in India; Expressways; National; State; Asian
← NH 65	→ NH 166

National Highway 66, commonly referred to as NH 66 (erstwhile NH-17 and a part of NH-47), is a 1640 km (1020 miles) long, mostly 4-lane National Highway that runs roughly north–south along the western coast of India, parallel to the Western Ghats. It connects Panvel, a city east of Mumbai to Kanyakumari via Mangaluru, passing through the states of Maharashtra, Goa, Karnataka, Kerala and Tamil Nadu. Also the road passes through Mahe district, the third district of Puducherry (union territory).

The highway is undergoing a major overhaul in Kerala, where the National Highways Authority of India (NHAI) is developing a six-lane national highway of international standard with a width of 45 metres. The complete 645-km stretch from Thalappady at the Karnataka border to Karode at the Tamil Nadu border is being widened to six lanes as part of the Bharatmala Pariyojana. In March 2026, major sections including the Thalappady–Chengala stretch and the Kozhikode Bypass were inaugurated, significantly easing coastal connectivity. Although the project faced unique challenges due to Kerala's high population density and land costs, leading to a reduced 45-metre right-of-way compared to the national 60-metre standard, the state government has supported the expansion by covering 25% of the land acquisition costs. Most remaining stretches are slated for completion by mid-2026.

The Ministry of Road Transport & Highways, Government of India has proposed a greenfield (i.e., new and parallel) access controlled expressway corridor connecting the port cities of Mangaluru-Karwar-Panaji as part of the Indian National Expressway Network. This expressway will be parallel to NH-66 and will be mainly located in coastal Karnataka. It is expected to be a 6/8 lane access-controlled 3D right-of-way designed expressway.

== Route description ==
The Mumbai–Goa stretch of NH-66 faces significant congestion, prompting the Maharashtra government to explore a Ro-Ro ferry service connecting Mumbai to Konkan ports at Jaigad in Ratnagiri and Vijaydurg in Sindhudurg as an alternative route. It starts at Panvel, at the junction of National Highway 48 (old NH4), and ends at Kanyakumari. NH-66 mainly traverses through the west coast of India, sometimes touching the shores of the Arabian Sea. The NH-66 touches the Arabian Sea at Maravanthe in Karnataka, Thalassery, and Alappuzha in Kerala. It passes through the Indian states of Maharashtra, Goa, Karnataka, Kerala and Tamil Nadu. The National Highway 66 (previously numbered NH-17) connects cities, towns, and major villages of different states as follows:

Maharashtra

Panvel, Pen, Mangaon, Mahad, Poladpur, Khed, Chiplun, Sangameshwar, Ratnagiri, Lanja, Rajapur, Kanakvali, Kudal, Sawantwadi.

Goa

Panaji, Margao.

Karnataka

Karawar, Ankola, Kumta, Honnavar, Manki, Murudeshwara, Bhatkal, Shiroor, Bainduru, Uppunda, Kirimanjeshwara, Navunda, Maravanthe, Hemmadi, Talluru, Kundapura, Koteshwara, Kota, Saligrama, Brahmavara, Udupi, Kapu, Padubidri, Mulki, Surathkal, Mangaluru, Thokottu, Ullal, Kotekar, Talapady.

Kerala

Uppala, Kasaragod, Kanhangad, Payyannur Pariyaram, Taliparamba, Dharmashala, Kannur, Dharmadam, Thalassery, Mahe, Vatakara, Payyoli, Koyilandi, Kozhikode, Ramanattukara, Tenhipalam, Kottakkal, Puthanathani, Valanchery, Kuttippuram, Thavanur, Ponnani, Chavakkad, Vadanappally, Kodungallur, Moothakunnam, North Paravur, Koonammavu, Varapuzha, Cheranallur, Edappally, Kochi, Aroor, Cherthala, Alappuzha, Ambalapuzha, Haripad, Kayamkulam, Karunagappally, Chavara, Neendakara, Kollam, Mevaram, Kottiyam, Chathannoor, Kallambalam, Attingal, Kazhakkoottam, Thiruvananthapuram, Balaramapuram, Neyyattinkara, Parassala.

Tamil Nadu

Marthandam, Nagercoil and Kanyakumari.

== Major intersections ==
State	District	Location	km	mi	Destinations	Notes
Maharashtra	Raigad	Panvel	0	0	NH 48 to New Delhi	Northern end of the highway.
Maharashtra	Raigad	Vadhkal	36	22	NH 166A to Alibag	
Maharashtra	Ratnagiri	Chiplun	216	134	NH 166E to Bijapur	
Maharashtra	Ratnagiri	Hatkhamba	289	180	NH 166 to Ratnagiri, Solapur	
Goa	North Goa	Panaji	513	319	NH 748 to Belgaum	
Goa	South Goa	Cortalim	529	329	NH 366 to Vasco da Gama	Route to Goa Dabolim Airport
Goa	South Goa	Verna	567	352	NH 566 to Vasco da Gama	Route to Goa Dabolim Airport
Karnataka	Uttara Kannada	Ankola	667	414	NH 52 to Sangrur	Terminus of NH 52
Karnataka	Uttara Kannada	Kumta	692	430	NH 766E to Haveri	Route to Devimane Ghat, Sirsi. Terminus of NH766E
Karnataka	Uttara Kannada	Honnavar	713	443	NH 69 to Chittoor	Terminus of NH 69
Karnataka	Udupi	Udupi	841	523	NH 169A to Thirthahalli	
Karnataka	Dakshina Kannada	Mangalore	900	560	NH 73 to Tumakuru NH 169 to Shivamogga	Terminus of NH 73
Kerala	Kannur	Thalassery	1,076	669	SH 30 to Mysore	Route to Mysore via NH 275 passing through Coorg
Kerala	Kozhikode	Malaparamba	1,122	697	NH 766 to Kollegal	
Kerala	Kozhikode	Ramanattukara	1,156	718	NH 966 to Palakkad	
Kerala	Ernakulam	Cheranallur	1,340	830	NH 966A to ICTT Kochi	
Kerala	Ernakulam	Edapally	1,346	836	NH 544 to Salem	
Kerala	Ernakulam	Kundannoor	1,356	843	NH 85 to Thondi; NH 966B to Cochin Port	Terminus of NH 85 Southern Naval Command headquarters - INS Vendruruthy
Kerala	Kollam	Chavara	1,473	915	NH 183A to Vandiperiyar	Terminus of NH 183A
Kerala	Kollam	Kadavoor	1,503	934	NH 183 to Theni/Dindigul	
Kerala	Kollam	Kallumthazham	1,530	950	NH 744 to Tirumangalam	
Tamil Nadu	Kanyakumari	Nagercoil	1,624	1,009	NH 944 to Kavalkinaru	
Tamil Nadu	Kanyakumari	Kanyakumari	1,640	1,020	NH 44	Southern end of the highway.
1.000 mi = 1.609 km; 1.000 km = 0.621 mi

== Road condition ==
The NHAI has received the approval to upgrade the complete stretch of highway, from start to end, to a four-lane highway, which will be 60 m (200 ft) and grade separated. Out of four states through which the highway goes, Karnataka and Maharashtra have received approval from the centre for the 60 m (200 ft) wide highway. Kerala and Goa have requested a narrower width of 45 m (148 ft), and there are protests against the highway being widened in these states. The four-laning of NH-66 (Mumbai-Kanyakumari) has been completed until Thalapadi in the Karnataka-Kerala border and only its stretch in Kerala is pending. In the beginning of 2017, Kerala government has announced the six laning of NH 66 in the state as a major agenda and said to be completed in three years. But the high value of land will make it hard for compensation, and the ruling party's influence is controversial in relation to similar acquisitions like GAIL pipeline. Now the process is going fast in spite of protests from various highway action forum groups, especially because it connects Kerala's capital Thiruvananthapuram to Kochi and of tourism importance. NH 66 has one of the highest vehicle densities in the state compared to sections of the highway in other states, so its development is vital for the overall development of the state, also the HAM model to be followed in widening will be instrumental in collecting the funds for the development. NHAI has been infamous for their heavy and long tenure of toll collection in the state. Till now 961 km (597 mi) stretch out of 1,608 km (999 mi) long National Highway 66 (NH 66) have been made into four-lane highway. Karnataka and Maharashtra are widening to six-lane & 529 km (329 mi) stretch out of 1,608 km (999 mi) long National Highway 66 (NH 66) have been made into six-lane highway. Tunnels will be constructed in the stretches where the road goes through the forest or ghat section. As the forest department does not allow land acquisition for road widening purposes, tunnels which can accommodate four-lane expressways are proposed for such stretches of the road in NH-66. One such proposal is the Maharashtra government's proposal of 1.4 kilometre tunnel at the Karnala bird sanctuary.

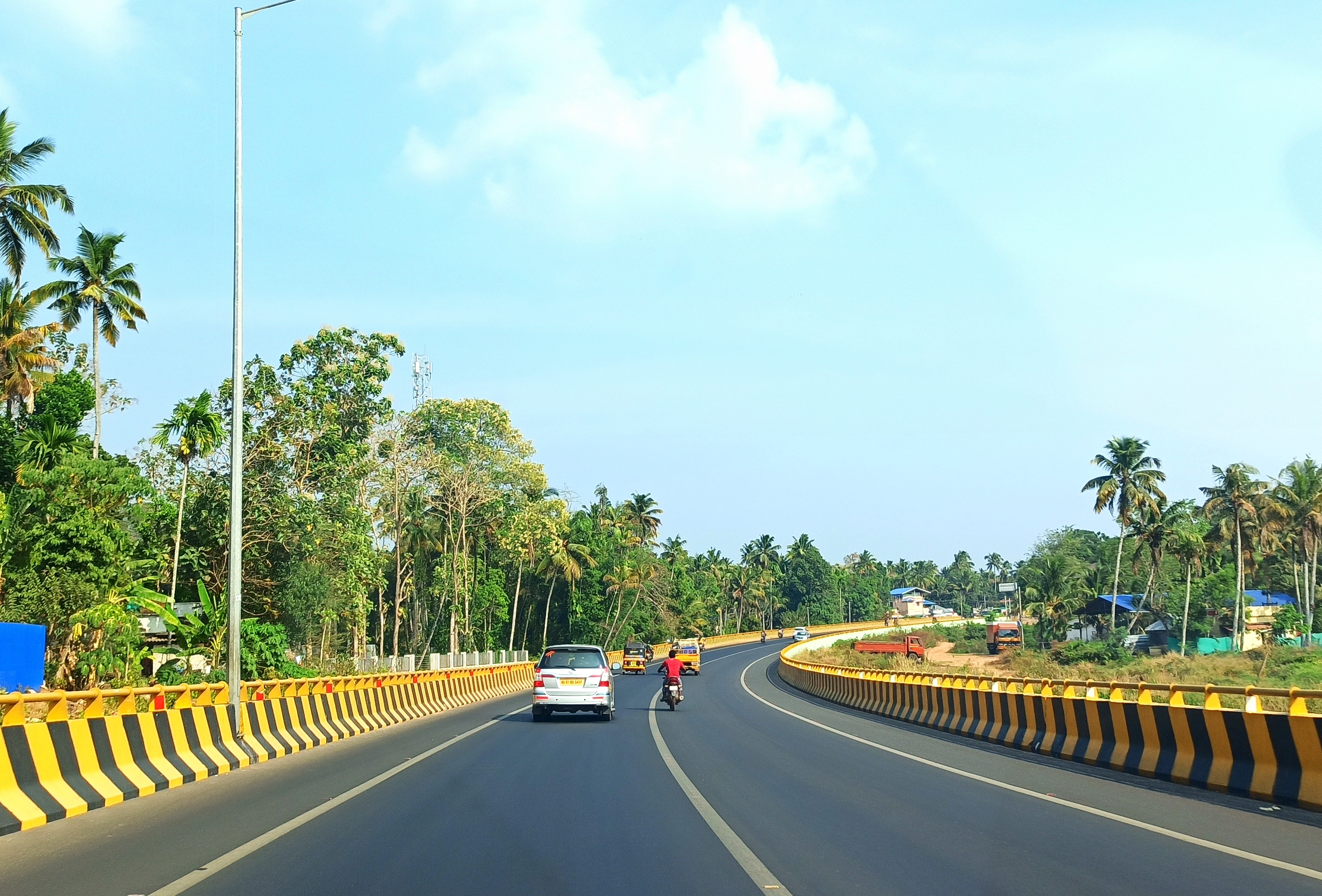
Kollam Bypass near Kadavoor

Currently, the road is comparatively narrow and without dividers for the most part. The lack of dividers has led to an increased incidence of head-on collisions between vehicles. At some places, signboards indicating left or right turns, speed-breakers, etc. are either damaged or missing. In addition to its narrow span, there are no guard railings along the sides of the highway. The sides of the road are at times at a lower level than the road. Due to heavy human settlement around the highway and narrow span, the average speed on this highway is far lesser than what can be attained on comparatively better highways such as NH3, NH4 or NH8. One can find carcasses of animals on the road, indicating the risk of inattentive animals coming into the road. Two-wheel vehicles must take a special note of this. The road surface is uneven at certain stretches, not just in rainy seasons, but even at other times.

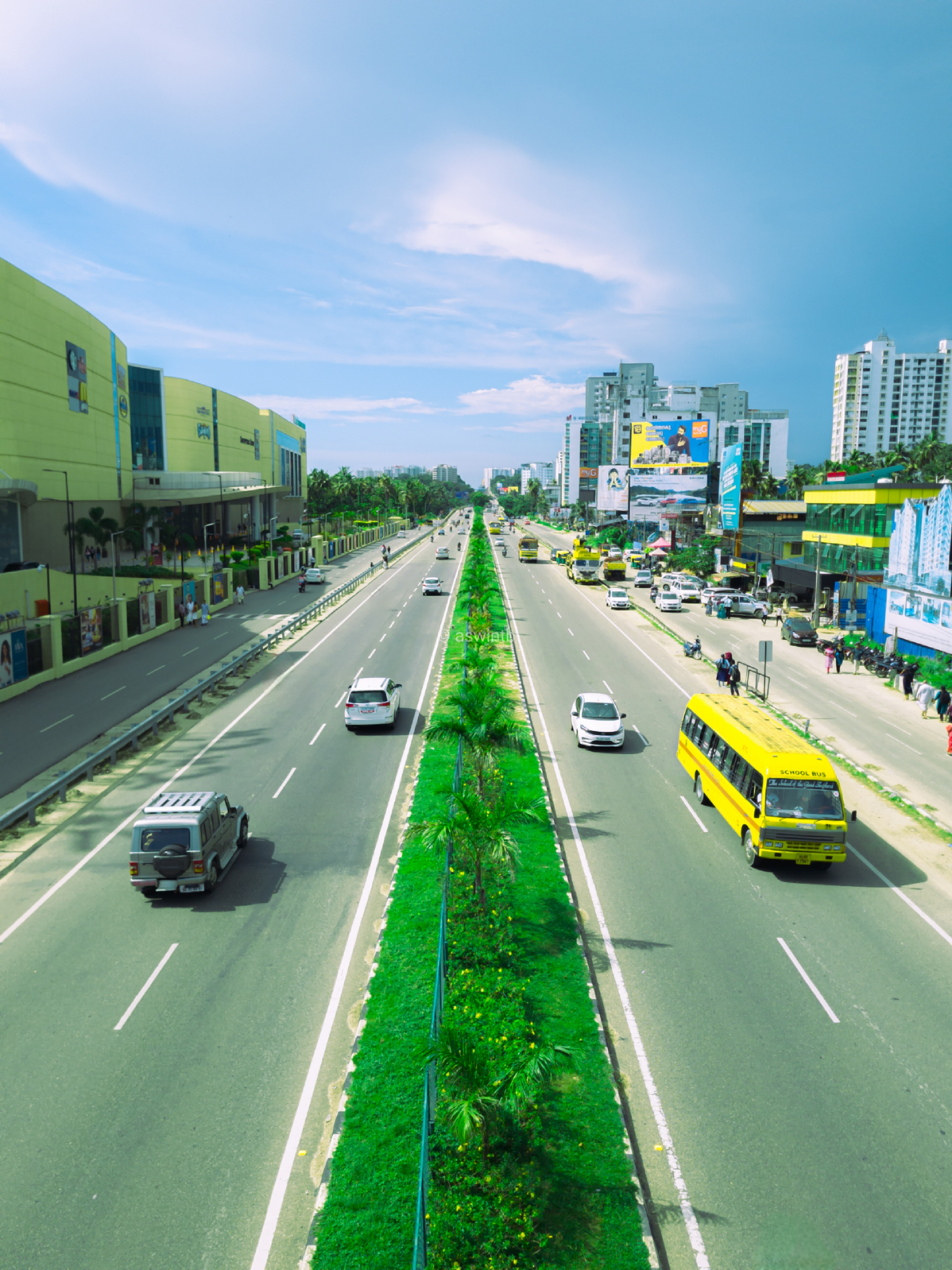
National Highway 66

At certain places in Karnataka, the surface is so badly damaged that the iron rods underneath are exposed. Presently, the work on widening this highway has been undertaken at certain stretches. Due to narrow span and lack of dividers, there are no separate lanes for oncoming traffic, driving and passing (over-taking). As a result, over-taking is quite rampant. At times, motorists attempt over-taking even on curves where the oncoming traffic cannot be seen. Other motorists are advised to be on the lookout for such oncoming vehicles.

On 19 March 2013 a bus carrying over 50 persons fell off a bridge close to a river in the Khed area of Ratnagiri district. 37 people were killed in the incident.

The highway in the state of Karnataka is being upgraded to a 60-metre-wide grade separated highway, in which vehicles can travel at a speed of 100 km per hour. It is a major overhaul, in which certain bridges are being constructed as six-lane bridges for the smooth movement of traffic. The widening work is going on in the complete stretch from the Goa border to the Kerala border. The stretch between Suratkal (NITK) to Kankanady cross (Mahavir Circle) has been already converted to four lanes. The four-lane stretch between Surathkal and Kundapura has been completed.

The Maximum permissible speed for this road is 100 km/h on 6-lane national highways in kerala.

== Connectivity ==
Prior to the building of National Highway 66 (NH 66), then known as National Highway 17 (NH17), in the 1960s and 1970s, ships and steamers running between Mumbai and Mangaluru calling at different ports were the only means of transport along the west coast of India adjoining the Arabian Sea. These ship services were abandoned later. The NH 66 connects the interior parts of the coastal regions with the rest of the country. The NH 66 connects the major sea ports of West India;JNPT at Nhava Sheva, Vizhinjam International Seaport at Trivandrum, Mormugao (MPT), New Mangalore (NMPA), International Container Transshipment Terminal at Kochi, Kollam Port, Ratnagiri Port and Beypore Port.

Hence this National Highway 66 allows for the movement of goods by trucks (lorries) from the hinterland to the major sea ports of India. Trade and commerce in the region have increased due to the expansion of markets for agricultural products and seafood produced in the region connected by this highway. The formation of NH 66 has led to the development of tourism in the region connected by this highway. Goa state is a classic example of this development. Many industries have been set up along National Highway 66, taking advantage of connectivity and proximity to ports on the Arabian Sea. The highway was the only source of connection between areas in the coastal districts, until the Konkan Railway was opened in 1998, between Mumbai and Mangaluru.

One can still find old number NH-17 written on boards of shops and other establishments along NH-66 highway even in the year 2017.

== Collapses ==
On 19 May 2025 at 2:30 pm IST, a section of National Highway 66 caved in near Kooriyad, Malappuram district, Kerala, at around 2:30 pm in May 2025. The collapse, including a retaining wall, fell onto the service road built over the filled paddy field, causing the nearby paddy field to split and form a small hill. The collapse occurred on a road under construction by the KNRCL company in the Ramanattukara-Valanchery reach of the new 6-lane National Highway. Four cars on the service road were damaged in the collapse. Seven passengers travelling in the car were injured. Three cars were involved in the accident, and seven were injured. The collapse significantly delayed construction on NH66. No casualties occurred.

The Ministry of Road Transport and Highways has issued an order to reconstruct the road and investigate the accident. The central government has debarred the KNRC company that was carrying out the construction. Member of Parliament (Malappuram) E. T. Mohammed Basheer discussed the accident details with Union Road Transport Minister Nitin Gadkari, and Nitin issued an order for investigation and banned the KNRC company that was carrying out the construction work. Kerala Chief Minister and Kerala Public Works Department have also ordered an investigation into the accident.

Union Road Transport Minister Nitin Gadkari agreed to carry out a full investigation into the collapse. Member of Parliament E. T. Mohammed Basheer met Union Minister Nitin Gadkari immediately after the incident and said that the Union Minister had assured that appropriate action would be taken against the National Highways Authority of India (NHAI) officials if they were found responsible for the lapses. He also said that Gadkari had said that steps would be taken to enforce the bank guarantee given by the contractor and blacklist the construction company. Congress President Sunny Joseph asked the Pinarayi Vijayan government to determine the responsibilities for the deteriorating National Highway 66.

Protests took place in Kooriyad, and Indian Youth Congress workers held a protest march to the KNRCL office. On 20 May, the Muslim Youth League held a protest march at Kuriyad.

Another similar incident occurred at Mylakkadu in Kollam, Kerala, on December 5, 2025.

In a landslide that occurred at Shirur village, Ankola taluk, Uttara Kannada district of Karnataka state on 16 July 2024, Six persons lost their lives and few vehicles washed away to nearby Aghanashini river. Unscientific construction of National Highway 66 by cutting hill in vertical steep manner instead of giving slope is said to be cause of landslide.

== Major cities and places on the highway ==
=== Maharashtra state ===
District	Places or Cities
Mumbai Suburban	Panvel
Raigad	Pen, Nagothane, Kolad, Indapur, Raigad, Mangaon, Mahad, Poladpur
Ratnagiri	Khed, Chiplun, Savarde, Sangameshwar, Lanja, Rajapur
Sindhudurg	Kankavli, Kudal, Sawantwadi, Sindhudurg, Banda

=== Goa state ===
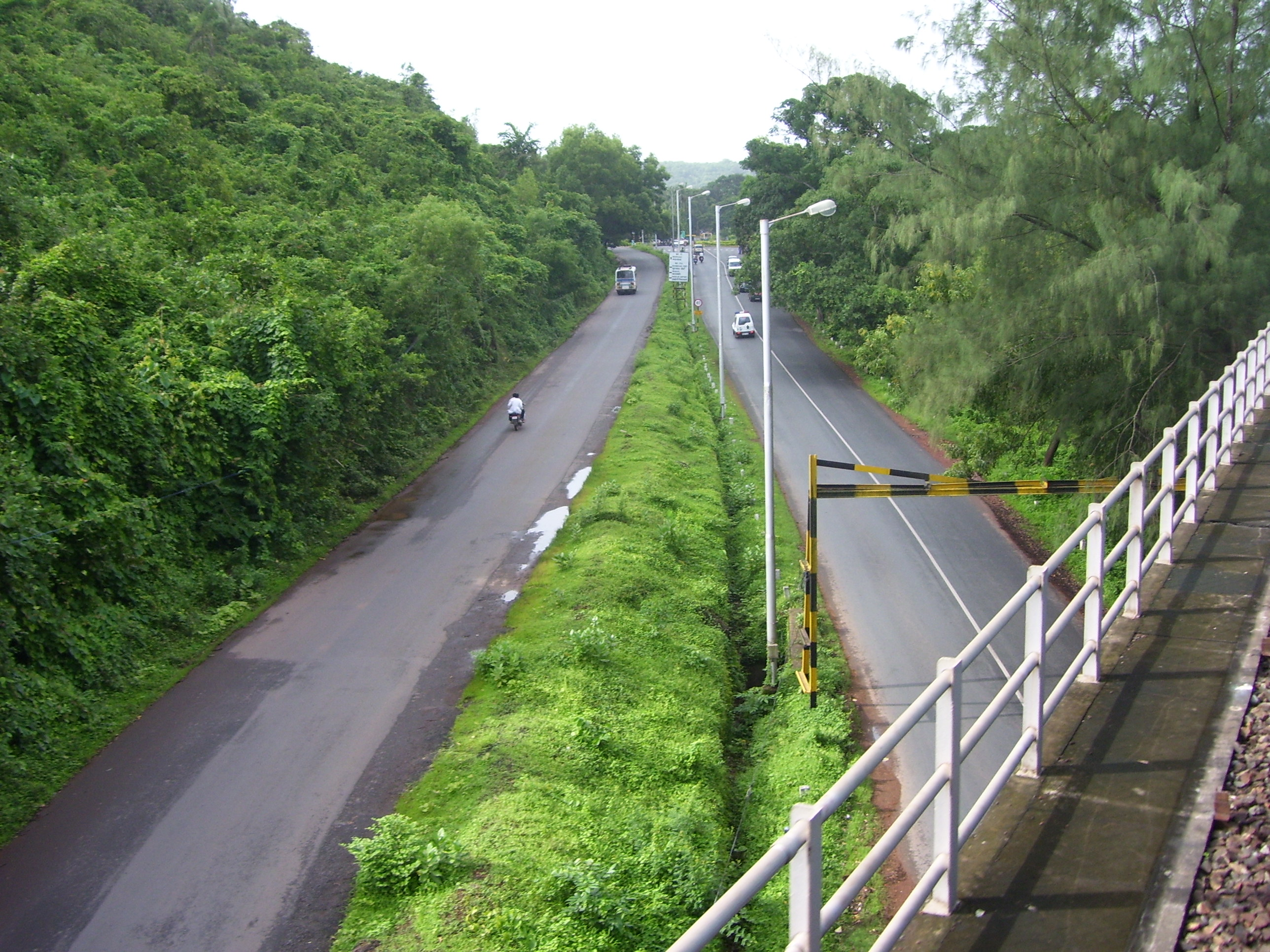
NH-66 in Goa

Pernem	Mapusa	Panjim
Margao	Cuncolim	Canacona

=== Karnataka state ===
==== Uttara Kannada District ====
Karwar	Ankola	Kumta
Honnavar	Murudeshwar	Bhatkal

==== Udupi district ====
NH 66 at Kapu

Baindooru	Uppunda	Maravanthe	Kundapura	Kota
Saligrama	Brahmavara	Udupi	Kapu	Padubidre

==== Dakshina Kannada ====
Mulki	Suratkal	Mangaluru	Ullal

=== Kerala state ===
District	Places or Cities
Kasaragod	Manjeshwar, Uppala, Kasaragod, Bekal, Kanhangad, Nileshwar, Cheruvathur, Payyanur
Kannur	Taliparamba, Kalliasseri, **Kannur**, Muzhappilangad, Dharmadom Thalassery, Kodiyeri
Kozhikode	Vatakara, Iringal, Payyoli, Moodadi, Koyilandy, Kappad, Vengalam, Elathur, **Kozhikode**, Pantheeramkavu, Ramanattukara
Malappuram	Tirurangadi, Kottakal, Puthanathani, Valanchery, Kuttippuram, Ponnani
Thrissur	Edakkazhiyur, Guruvayur, Chavakkad, Chettuva, Vadanappally, Thalikulam, Triprayar, Valapad, Kodungallur,
Ernakulam	North Paravur, Koonammavu, Cheranallur, **Kochi**, Edappally, Palarivattom Vyttila, Maradu
Alappuzha	Aroor, Thuravoor, Cherthala, Alappuzha, Punnapra, Vandanam, Ambalapuzha, Karuvatta, Haripad, Kayamkulam
Kollam	Oachira, Karunagappalli, Chavara, Neendakara, **Kollam**, Thrikkadavoor, Mevaram, Kottiyam, Chathannoor, Parippally
Thiruvananthapuram	Alamcode, Attingal, Kazhakkoottam, Kochuveli, **Thiruvananthapuram**, Vizhinjam, Parassala

- **Bold** indicates cities

=== Puducherry (union territory) ===
Mahé

=== Tamil Nadu state ===
Marthandam	Thuckalay
Nagercoil	Kanyakumari

== Toll Plazas ==
- Savitri, Maharashtra
- Belekeri, Karnataka
- Gundmi, Karnataka
- Hejamadi, Karnataka
- Holegadde, Karnataka
- Shirur, Karnataka
- Talapady, Karnataka
- Thiruvangad, Kerala
- Kumbalam, Kerala
- Thiruvallam, Kerala

=== Under construction Toll Plazas in Kerala ===
District	Location
Kasaragod district	Pulloor Periya
Kannur district	Kalliassery
Kozhikode district	Mampuzha
Malappuram district	Vettichira
Thrissur district	Nattika
Alappuzha district	Kommadi
Kollam district	Ochira
Kollam district	Parippally
Thiruvananthapuram district	Thiruvallam

== Major city/town bypass roads on the highway ==
Bypass	District	State
Thiruvananthapuram Bypass	Thiruvananthapuram	Keralam
Attingal Bypass	Thiruvananthapuram	Keralam
Kollam Bypass	Kollam	Keralam
Alappuzha Bypass	Alappuzha	Keralam
Kochi Bypass	Ernakulam	Keralam
Kodungallur Bypass	Thrissur	Keralam
Vadanappally Bypass	Thrissur	Keralam
Ponnani Bypass	Malappuram	Keralam
Valanchery Bypass	Malappuram	Keralam
Puthanathani Bypass	Malappuram	Keralam
Kottakkal Bypass	Malappuram	Keralam
Kozhikode Bypass	Kozhikode	Keralam
Koyilandy Bypass	Kozhikode	Keralam
Vadakara Bypass	Kozhikode	Keralam
Thalassery-Mahe Bypass	Kannur	Keralam
Taliparamba Bypass	Kannur	Keralam
Payyannur Bypass	Kannur	Keralam
Sawantwadi Bypass	Sindhudurg	Maharashtra
Margao Western Bypass	South Goa	Goa

== Lifestyle along NH 66 ==
NH 66 passes through hills, forests, rivers, rivulets, and streams, generally flowing westwards towards the Arabian Sea. Most of the region has typical scenes like coconut trees dotted all along with paddy fields and arecanut gardens. The road is uneven, and bumps, curves, steep rises and narrow paths in between hillocks are found all over this highway. As this region experiences heavy rainfall, potholes are abundant.

Although the languages spoken vary along the highway, the food of the people along the NH 66 has some common ingredients like coconut, chili, pepper, coconut oil, and fish. The region has a higher literacy rate than other regions of India. The building of National Highway 66 has led to rapid development of the towns and cities along the highway.

== Parallel access controlled expressway ==
This highway is expected to lose importance in coastal Karnataka as the Ministry of Road Transport & Highways, Government of India has proposed a greenfield (i.e., new and parallel) access controlled expressway corridor connecting the port cities of Mangaluru, Karwar, and Panaji. This highway-expressway combination can be compared to the Mumbai-Pune Highway-Expressway combination.

== See also ==
- List of national highways in India
- National Highways Development Project
- National Highway 75 (India)
- National Highway 73 (India)
- National Highway 169 (India)
- National Highway 52 (India)
- National Highway 275 (India)
- National Highway 544 (India)
- Konkan Railway Corporation
- National Highway 944 (India)
- Collapse of Cần Thơ Bridge
