= Shirur =

Shirur may refer to various places in India:

== People ==
- Suma Shirur (born 1974), Indian shooting competitor

== Places ==
=== Maharashtra ===
- Shirur, Maharashtra, a city in Pune district of Maharashtra
  - Shirur taluka, a tehsil in Pune district of Maharashtra
  - Shirur (Lok Sabha constituency), Maharashtra
  - Shirur (Vidhan Sabha constituency), in the Maharashtra Legislative Assembly
- Shirur Kasar, a tehsil in Beed district of Maharashtra
- Shirur Tajband, a village in Latur district of Maharashtra

=== Karnataka ===
- 33 Shiroor, a village in Udupi Taluk, Udupi district, Karnataka
- 41 Shiroor, a village in Udupi Taluk, Udupi district, Karnataka
  - Shiroor Math, one of the Ashta Mathas of Udupi in 41 Shiroor village
- Shiroor, a village in Kundapur Taluk, Udupi district, Karnataka
  - Shiroor railway station
- Shirur, Belgaum, a village in Belgaum district, Karnataka
- Shirur, Dharwad, a village in Dharwad district, Karnataka
- Hodke Shiroor, a village in Honnavar Taluk, Uttara Kannada district, Karnataka

== See also ==
- Shirur Anantpal, a town in Latur district, Maharashtra
- Shirur Anantpal Taluka, a taluka in Latur district, Maharashtra
- Shirur Kasar, a tehsil in Beed district, Maharashtra
