= Shiroor (disambiguation) =

Shiroor may refer to various places in India:

== Places ==
- 33 Shiroor, a village in Udupi Taluk, Udupi district, Karnataka
- 41 Shiroor, a village in Udupi Taluk, Udupi district, Karnataka
  - Shiroor Math, a Ashta Mathas of Udupi in the village
- Shiroor, a village in Kundapur Taluk, Udupi district, Karnataka
  - Shiroor railway station, a station in Konkan Railway, Karnataka
- Hodke Shiroor, a village in Honnavar Taluk, Uttara Kannada district, Karnataka

== See also ==
- Shirur (disambiguation)
