= National Highway 266 (India) =

National highway in India

National Highway 266
- Map of National Highway 266 in red

Route information
- Auxiliary route of NH 61
- Length: 166 km (103 mi)

Major junctions
- East end: Jat
- West end: Karad

Location
- Country: India
- States: Maharashtra

Highway system
- Roads in India; Expressways; National; State; Asian
← NH 48	→ NH 166E

National Highway 266, commonly referred to as NH 266 is a national highway in India. It is a spur road of National Highway 61. NH-266 traverses the state of Maharashtra in India. This highway is being rehabilitated and upgraded to 2 lanes with paved shoulders.

== Route ==
Jat - Kavathe Mahankal - Tasgaon - Palus - Karad.

== Junctions ==
NH 166E terminal near Jat.
NH 965G terminal near Jat.
NH 166 near Borgaon - Shirdhon.
NH 160 near Tasgaon.
NH 48 Terminal near Karad
NH 166E Terminal near Karad.

== See also ==
- List of national highways in India
- List of national highways in India by state
