= Puthanathani Bypass =

NH bypass in Kerala

Route information
- Maintained by NHAI
- Length: 1.50 km (0.93 mi)
- Status: Under Construction (50% finished)
- History: 2022-Present Timeline: Planned : 2019; Approval : 2022; Phase-I : 2024

Major junctions
- South end: NH-66 in Central Junction Puthanthani

Location
- Country: India
- Towns: Puthanathani

Highway system
- Roads in India; Expressways; National; State; Asian

Puthanathani Bypass is a part of NH 66 that bypasses Puthanathani town in Malappuram metropolitan area in Kerala, India. The busy 1.50 km long bypass starts at Athirumada near Randathani in the south to Puthanathani in the north, via Central Junction Puthanathani in Puthanathani Town

== Chungam Puthanathani Viaduct ==
Chungam Puthanathani Viaduct is under construction at the end of Puthanathani Bypass. 90% of the construction work of this Viaduct bridge is completed. This Viaduct bridge, which starts at the end of Puthanathani Bypass, is 1 km long. This Viaduct ends at Vettichira Overpass

== See also ==
- Valanchery Bypass
- Kottakkal Bypass
- NH-66
- Malappuram metropolitan area
- Puthanathani
