= National Highway 944 (India) =

National highway in India

National Highway 944
- Map of National Highway 944 in red

Route information
- Auxiliary route of NH 44
- Maintained by NHAI
- Length: 23 km (14 mi)

Major junctions
- East end: NH 44 in Kavalkinaru
- West end: NH 66 near Nagercoil

Location
- Country: India
- States: Tamil Nadu

Highway system
- Roads in India; Expressways; National; State; Asian
← NH 844	→ NH 45

National Highway 944 (NH 944) is a short Indian National Highway entirely within the state of Tamil Nadu. This 23-kilometre-long (14 mi) highway links Nagercoil in Kanyakumari district to Kavalkinaru in Tirunelveli District.

== See also ==
- List of national highways in India
- National Highways Development Project
