= Traffic collisions in India =

Death rates from road traffic collisions by country, per 100,000 inhabitants, world map (WHO 2012). Indian traffic fatality rate was about 17 per 100,000 people. (Note: The following groupings/assumptions were made: France includes the overseas departments as well as overseas collectivities.; The United Kingdom includes the Crown dependencies as well as the overseas territories.; The United States of America includes the insular areas.; The Netherlands includes Aruba and the Netherlands Antilles.; Denmark includes Greenland and the Faroe islands.; China includes the SARs of Hong Kong and Macao.) fewer than 5 5-10 10-15 15-20 20-25 25-30 30-35 35-40 more than 40

Total number of persons killed and injured due to road accidents, from 2001 to 2010

Traffic collisions in India are a major source of deaths, injuries and property damage every year. The National Crime Records Bureau (NCRB) 2021 report states that there were 155,622 fatalities, the highest level since 2014, out of which 69,240 deaths were due to two-wheelers. A study by the Insurance Institute for Highway Safety, U.S. shows that the use of seat belts significantly reduces the risks and injuries from road accidents, and yet there is no enforcement on use of seat belts in cars. A study by IIT Delhi points out that the national highways constitute only 2% of the length of roads in India, but they account for 30.3% of total road accidents and 36% of deaths.

The NCRB data for 2021 shows 17,993 accidents in Indian Railways, a rise in 38% compared to the year 2020, with most accidents in Maharashtra.

According to the 2013 global survey of traffic collisions by the UN World Health Organization, India suffered a road fatality rate of 16.6 per 100,000 people in 2013. India's average traffic collision fatality rate was similar to the world average rate of 17.4 deaths per 100,000 people, less than the low-income countries which averaged 24.1 deaths per 100,000, and higher than the high-income countries which reported the lowest average rate of 9.2 deaths per 100,000 in 2013.

== Statistics ==
Year	Total number of road accidents	Change	Total number of persons killed	Change	Total number of persons injured	Change
2015	501,423		146,133		500,279	
2016	480,652	-4.14	150,785	3.18	494,624	-1.13
2017	464,910	-3.28	147,913	-1.90	470,975	-4.78
2018	467,044	0.46	151,417	2.37	469,418	-0.33
2019	449,002	-3.86	151,113	-0.20	451,361	-3.85
Total in last five years	2,363,031		747,361		2,386,657	
Average	472,606		149,472		477,331	

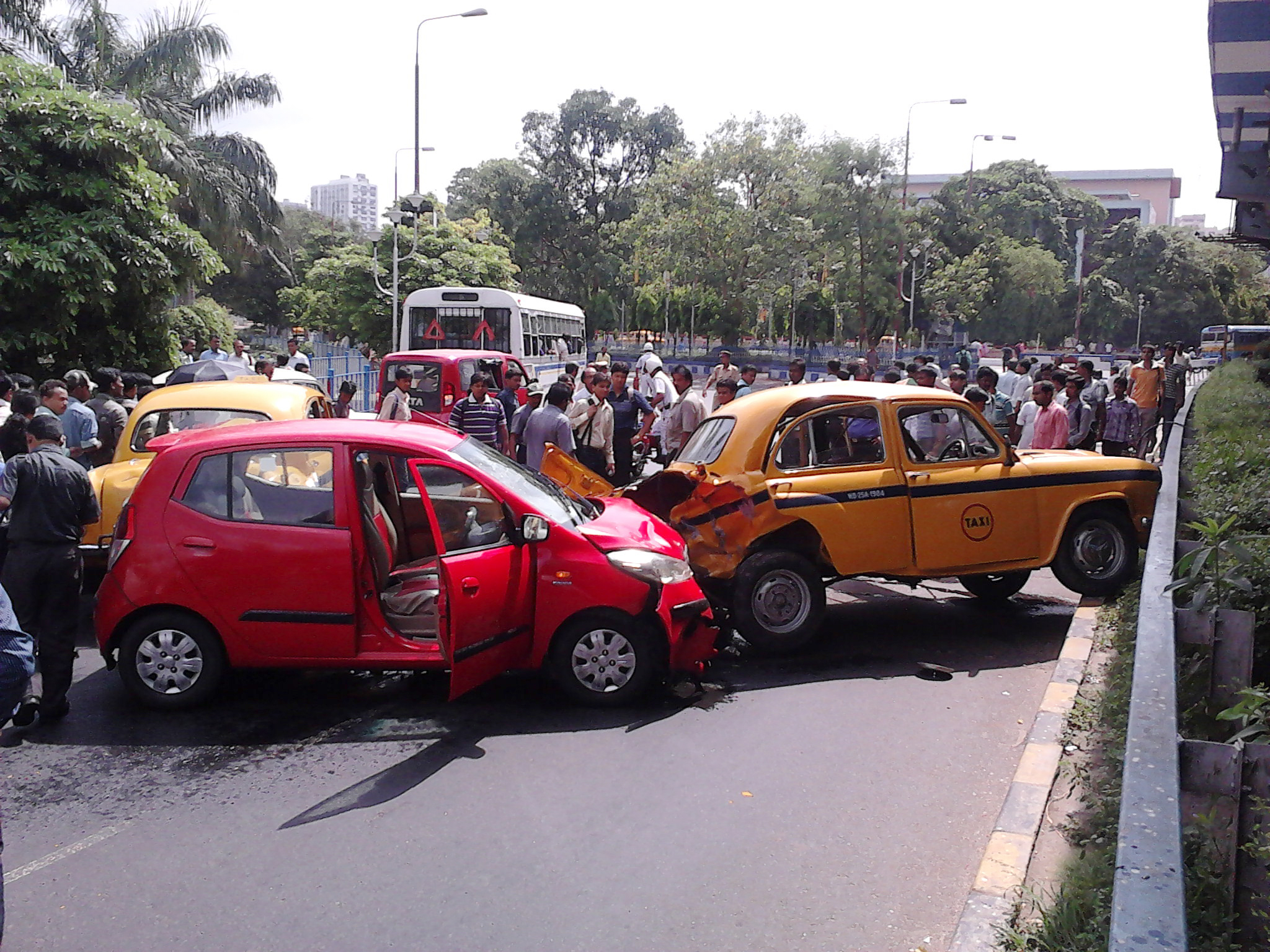
Multiple vehicle collision occurred on a busy road crossing at office time in Kolkata.

Tamil Nadu records the highest road collisions for a decade and its capital Chennai has more collisions than any other city in India. The city has had the dubious distinction of having one of the highest rates of death from road accidents globally from as far back as the 1960s at a time when the number of vehicles in the city was a minuscule fraction of that in larger metropolises of the world such as New York and Tokyo. In New Delhi, the capital of India, the frequency of traffic collisions is 40 times higher than the rate in London, the capital of the United Kingdom.

Traffic collision-related deaths increased from 13 per hour in 2008 to 14 per hour in 2009. In 2015, 15 people per hour die due to road accident according to NGO 'Indians for Road Safety'.

More than 40% of these casualties are associated with motorcycles and trucks. In India, there are 295 million cars in 2019, 272 million in 2018, according to Transport Ministry data.

The most collision-prone time on Indian roads is during the peak hour at afternoon and evening.

According to road traffic safety experts, the actual number of casualties may be higher than what is documented, as many traffic collisions go unreported. Moreover, victims who die some time after the collision, a span of time which may vary from a few hours to several days, are not counted as car crash victims.

However, India is making progress in road safety, with a new global survey ranking it safer for driving than the United States. According to the Zutobi annual report, which assesses road safety worldwide, India ranks 49th, while the US is at 51st.

== Economic cost ==
The Planning Commission in its 2001–2003 research estimated that traffic collision resulted in an annual monetary loss of $10 billion (INR 550 billion) during the years 1999–2000. In 2012, the International Road Federation (IRF) estimated that traffic collision results in an annual monetary loss of $20 billion (INR 1 trillion (short scale)) in India. This figure includes expenses associated with the collision victim, property damage and administration expenses.

== Contributing factors ==
The "GlobStatus Report on Road Safety" published by the World Health Organization (WHO) identified the major causes of traffic collisions as driving over the speed limit, driving under the influence, and not using helmets and seat belts. Failure to maintain lane or yield to oncoming traffic, when turning are prime causes of collisions on four lane, non-access controlled National Highways. The report noted users of motorcycles and motor-powered three-wheelers constitute the second largest group of traffic collision deaths.

== Road safety in India ==
Road safety is emerging as a major social concern in the country and the Indian government has been attempting to tackle this crucial issue for several years. The Road Transport and Safety Bill, 2014 was to provide a framework for safer, faster, cost-effective and inclusive movement of passengers and freight in India. In July 2015, Indian Prime Minister Narendra Modi said his government will soon introduce laws to enhance road safety as traffic fatalities and injuries mount. A new Road Transport and Safety Bill is under preparation and a group of experts underlined the "urgent" need of a comprehensive national road safety legislation.

Embarq India, an initiative from the World Resources Institute (WRI), has developed significant expertise in conducting road safety audits on a number of bus rapid transit systems in India. Arrive SAFE is a NGO who works as a pressure group to give a wake-up call to authorities concerned and shake the bad driving habits of Indian people. Indian driving schools focus on youth to enhance the art and skill of efficient driving.

=== Many multinational companies fund NGOs as part of their own road safety initiatives ===
Maruti Suzuki closely works with Ministry of Tribal Development in Gujarat to train young people in driving.

Michelin, co-founder of the Global Road Safety Initiatives (GRSI), has established, in India, an innovative partnership with the foundation of PVR Cinemas, PVR Nest as part of its CineArt "Steer to Safety" program to educate and empower children about road safety. Through this platform, children learn how to prevent and/or manage in emergency situations on Indian roads.

Henkel has launched a road safety initiative in an effort to address the topical issue of safety standards on the road in India.

The Campaign Against Drunken Driving (CADD) is an organization founded by Prince Singhal which is campaigning against driving under the influence. But this campaign has been ineffective. The IRF asserts that people in India's political sphere do not have the will to curb traffic collisions. Harman Singh Siddhu of ArriveSafe, an organization working for improvement in road traffic safety, asserted that a general lack of respect for traffic rules in India is a contributing factor for road collisions. He also has pointed out that although the 2010s was declared by the United Nations as "Decade of Action for Road Safety", no celebration was held in India. CSIR - Central Road Research Institute has developed an online accident recording portal. The main purpose of this portal is to encourage people to report the collisions they see. A group of Indian Researchers have developed a low-cost device which prevents automobile drivers from receiving or making cellphone calls when at wheel, but allows calls to other passengers in the vehicle.

== See also ==
- Roads in India
- List of Indian rail incidents
- Road accidents in Tamil Nadu
- Vattapara accident zone
