= Kottakkal Bypass =

NH bypass in Kerala

Route information
- Maintained by NHAI
- Length: 6.58 km (4.09 mi)
- Status: Under Construction (70% finished)
- Existed: 2022–present
- History: 2022-Present Timeline: Planned : 2019; Approval : 2022; Phase-I : 2024

Major junctions
- From: NH-66 in Swagathamadu
- To: NH-66 in Palachiramad near Kozhichena

Location
- Country: India
- Major cities: Kottakkal

Highway system
- Roads in India; Expressways; National; State; Asian

Kottakkal Bypass or Kottakkal Viaduct is a part of NH 66 that bypasses of Kottakkal city in Malappuram metropolitan area in Kerala, India. The busy 6.58 km long bypass starts at Palachiramad near Edarikode in the south to Kottakkal in the north, via Swagathamadu, Kottakkal-Chenakkal in Chankuvetti (Kottakkal city).

== See also ==
- Valanchery Bypass
- Kottakkal
- NH-66
- Malappuram metropolitan area
