= National Highway 166 (India) =

National highway in India

National Highway 166
- Map of National Highway 166 in red

Route information
- Length: 365 km (227 mi)

Major junctions
- From: Ratnagiri
- To: Solapur

Location
- Country: India
- States: Maharashtra
- Primary destinations: Tink – Pali

Highway system
- Roads in India; Expressways; National; State; Asian
← NH 165	→ NH 167

National Highway 166 (NH 166) is a National Highway in India. It runs from Ratnagiri to Solapur via Kolhapur, Sangli, Miraj, Solapur in Maharashtra. This is a main link connecting Konkan region to South-Western region in Maharashtra. The complete highway is built of rigid pavement with paved shoulders on both sides.

== Route ==
Ratnagiri – Kolhapur – Sangli – Miraj – Solapur

== Junctions ==
SH 4 Terminal near Ratnagiri

NH 66 concurrency from Hathkhamba to Pali

NH 48 near Kolhapur

NH 160 near Miraj – Sangli

NH 166H near Miraj – Sangli

NH 266 near Borgaon – Shirdhon

NH 166E near Nagaj

NH 965G near Sangola

NH 561A near Mangalwedha

NH 52 near Solapur
