= National Highway 166E (India) =

National highway in India

National Highway 166E
- Map of National Highway 166E in red

Route information
- Auxiliary route of NH 66
- Length: 332 km (206 mi)

Major junctions
- West end: Guhagar
- East end: Bijapur

Location
- Country: India
- States: Maharashtra, Karnataka

Highway system
- Roads in India; Expressways; National; State; Asian
← NH 66	→ NH 52

National Highway 166E, commonly referred to as NH 166E is a national highway in India. It is a spur road of National Highway 66. NH-166E traverses the states of Maharashtra and Karnataka in India.

== Route ==
Guhagar, Chiplun, Patan, Karad, Kadegaon, Vita, Khanapur, Nagaj, Jat, Bijapur.

== Junctions ==
NH 166C near Guhagar.
NH 66 near Chiplun.
NH 48 Interchange near Karad.
NH 266 near Karad.
NH 160 near Vita.
NH 166 near Nagaj.
NH 266 terminal near Jat
NH 965G near Jat.
NH 548B near Tikota.
NH 52 Terminal near Bijapur.

== Upgradation ==
Post declaration of this route as national highway, construction process to upgrade the road to national highway standards started in 2017. Larsen & Toubro was awarded the contract to upgrade 48.4 km section from Helwak to Karad.

== See also ==
- List of national highways in India
- List of national highways in India by state
