= National Highway 166A (India) =

National highway in India

National Highway 166A
- Map of the National Highway in red

Route information
- Length: 29 km (18 mi)

Major junctions
- East end: Vadkhal
- West end: Alibag

Location
- Country: India
- States: Maharashtra

Highway system
- Roads in India; Expressways; National; State; Asian
← NH 66	→ NH 66

National Highway 166A, commonly referred to as NH 166A is a national highway in India. It is a spur road of National Highway 66. NH-166A traverses the state of Maharashtra in India.

== Route ==
Vadkhal - Alibag.

== Junctions ==
NH 66 Terminal near Vadkhal.

== See also ==
- List of national highways in India
- List of national highways in India by state
