= Vattapara accident zone =

Road in India notable for traffic accidents

Route information
- Length: 0.5 km (0.31 mi; 1,600 ft)

Location
- Country: India
- States: Kerala:
- Primary destinations: Vattapara Valanchery,

Highway system
- Roads in India; Expressways; National; State; Asian

Vattapara Hairpin Turn also known as (Vattapara accident zone) is a road and place along the Indian National Highway 66 near Valanchery, Malappuram District, Kerala, India, that is known for a high number of accidents. Over a five-year period there were 300 accidents, 200 injuries, and 30 deaths.

== History ==
Vattapara Hairpin Turn is located at a distance of about 4 km from Valanchery in Malappuram district, on the National Highway formerly known as NH 17 and now NH 66. The 'Vattapara bend' is an 'infamous' bend in Vattapara between Puthanathani and Valanchery. The number of vehicles that have flipped on the turn is not tracked. There have been more than 300 road accidents in the last five years. More than 30 deaths, more than 200 injured. It is a common sight for locals to see vehicles coming and going, and firefighters ringing bells and trying to lift the vehicle. This road also called Bermuda Triangle in Malappuram district at Vattapara bend, a death trap for tanker lorries

== Reason of accident ==
Frequent vehicular accidents are caused by the slope of the road approaching the curve and the lack of scientificity in the construction of the curve in terms of the slope of the surface. Related to the theory of 'Banking of the Curve' (Banked turn). A vehicle speeding through a curve will still have a tendency to roll out. This is called centrifugal force. If this force survives the friction between the vehicle's tire and the road, the vehicle will fall out. This friction also depends on the speed of the vehicle, the condition of the road surface, and the load on the vehicle. Here the slope of the road is to the left. Curving vehicles are at risk by default. Tanker lorries and truckers who get off the first part at fairly good speeds at night and elsewhere without adequate warnings, or without heeding warnings, suddenly notice a single hairpin bend to the right. Most of the time, they cut to the right at once and the cart overturns to the left and the left to the left.

== Ways to cope with an accident ==
=== Change traffic ===
- Solutions -1 is a bypass road that connects directly from Kanjipura to Valanchery Moodal before the Vattapara bend on the National Highway diverts traffic.
- Solutions - 2 The second solution is to widen the roads from Puthanathani to Thirunavaya Kuttipuram to divert traffic.

== See also ==
- Valanchery
- Roads in Kerala
- National Highway 66 (India)
- Traffic collisions in India
- Puthanathani
- Kuttipuram
- Banked turn
