= Senapura railway station =

Railway station in Karnataka, India

General information
- Coordinates: 13.7179°N 74.6845°E
- Owner: Indian Railways
- Line: Konkan Railway
- Platforms: 1
- Tracks: 1

Other information
- Status: Active
- Station code: SEN

Services
Preceding station	Indian Railways	Following station
Bijoor towards Roha	Konkan Railway Konkan Railway	Kundapura towards Thokur
Route map
Location
- Location within Karnataka

Senapura railway station is a station on Konkan Railway in Byndoor Taluk Udupi District of Karnataka state, India. It is at a distance of 646.192 km (401.5 mi) down from origin. The preceding station on the line is Bijoor railway station and the next station is Kundapura railway station towards Surathkal, Mangaluru. It is the nearest station to the famous Maravanthe beach on the shores of Arabbi Samudra, approximately 6km away.

As of 6 January 2025, the following trains stop at Senapura (SEN) station:

- Mangaluru Central(MAQ) - Madgaon Junction (MAO) MEMU Express (Train numbers 10107 / 10108) runs everyday except sunday.
- Mangaluru Central-Madgaon Express (Train.nos 56615 /566616) runs daily.
