= Bhatkal railway station =

Railway station in Karnataka, India

Bhatkal

General information
- Location: India
- Coordinates: 13.9894°N 74.5657°E
- System: Express train and Passenger train station
- Owner: Indian Railways
- Operator: Konkan Railway
- Line: Konkan Railway

Construction
- Structure type: Standard
- Accessible: Yes

Other information
- Status: Functioning
- Station code: BTJL
- Fare zone: Konkan Railway

History
- Opened: 1997; 29 years ago

Services
Preceding station	Indian Railways	Following station
Chitrapur towards Roha	Konkan Railway Konkan Railway	Shiroor towards Thokur
Route map
Location
- Location within Karnataka

Bhatkal railway station is a railway station in coastal Karnataka in South India. Its four-letter code is BTJL.

== Background ==
Konkan Railway Academy(KRA) is situated here providing training to entire konkan railway employees.

== Infrastructure ==
This station has two platforms and four tracks.

== Lines ==
There is a single track 5 ft 6 in (1,676 mm) broad gauge that was electrified in 2024

== Location ==
It lies off the Kanyakumari–Panvel Road, in Bhatkal, PIN Code 581320. The Mangalore Bajpe Airport (Code: IXE) is 125 km away. The station is located at an elevation of 15 metres above sea level. It lies within the KR/Konkan Zone under the Karwar Division.

== Other stations ==
It falls under Karwar railway division of Konkan Railway zone, a subsidiary zone of Indian Railways. under the jurisdiction of Konkan Railway. Bhatkal has 3 stations viz Bhatkal, Chitrapur Halt, Murdeshwar
