= Mookambika Road Byndoor railway station =

Railway station in India

Mookambika Road Byndoor
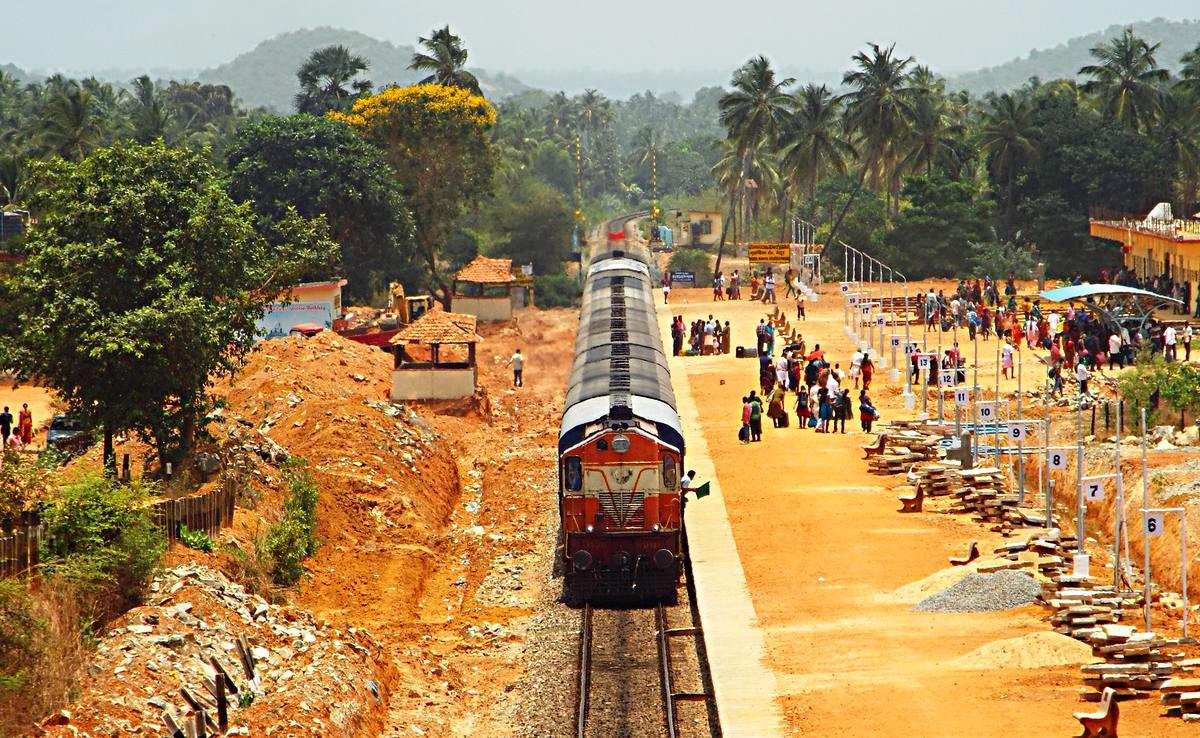

General information
- Location: India
- Coordinates: 13.9894°N 74.5657°E
- System: Express train and Passenger train station
- Owner: Indian Railways
- Operator: Konkan Railway
- Line: Konkan Railway

Construction
- Structure type: Standard
- Accessible: Yes

Other information
- Status: Functioning
- Station code: BYNR
- Zone(s): Konkan Railway
- Fare zone: Indian Railways

History
- Opened: 1997; 29 years ago
- Former names: Byndoor

Services
Preceding station	Indian Railways	Following station
Shiroor towards Roha	Konkan Railway	Bijoor towards Thokur
Route map
Location
- Location within Karnataka

Mookambika Road Byndoor railway station (Station code: BYNR) is a railway station in Byndoor,Udupi district ,Karnataka state, India under the jurisdiction of the Konkan Railway Corporation Limited.The station primarily serves pilgrims visiting the famous Kollur Mookambika Temple and is the nearest railway station to reach the temple. It falls under the Karwar region of the Konkan Railway.

Baindur (Byndoor) railway station was built and is operated & maintained by Konkan Railway Corporation (KRCL) a public sector company which was incorporated on 19 July 1990 and obtained certificate of commencement on 20 August 1990. As of 26 April 2026,It is Halt station with a single platform and a single railway track.

== Major trains ==
Major trains available from Byndoor station are as follows:

● Dadar–Tirunelveli Express (22629/22630)

● Netravati Express (16345/16346)

● Matsyagandha Express (12619/12620)

● Mumbai CSMT–Mangaluru Junction SF Express (12133/12134)

● Marusagar SF Express (12977/12978)

● Mumbai LTT–Kochuveli Garib Rath Express (12201/12202)

● Poorna Express (11097/11098)

● Panchaganga SF Express (16595/16596)

● Kacheguda–Murdeshwar SF Express (12789/12790)

● Madgaon–Ernakulam SF Express (10215/10216)

● Shri Ganganagar–Kochuveli Express (16311/16312)

● Thiruvananthapuram–Veraval Express (16333/16334)

● Nagercoil–Gandhidham Express (16335/16336)

● Ernakulam–Okha Express (16337/16338)

● Kochuveli–Bhavnagar Express (19259/19260)

● Coimbatore–Jabalpur SF Special (02197/02198)

● Surat–Mangaluru Special (09057/09058)

● Madgaon–Yesvantpur Special (06507/06508)

● Madgaon–Mangaluru MEMU Express (10107/10108)

● Mangaluru–Madgaon Passenger (56615/56616)

● Yesvantpur–Karwar Express (16515/16516)

● SMVT Bengaluru–Murdeshwar Express (16585/16586)

== Gallery ==
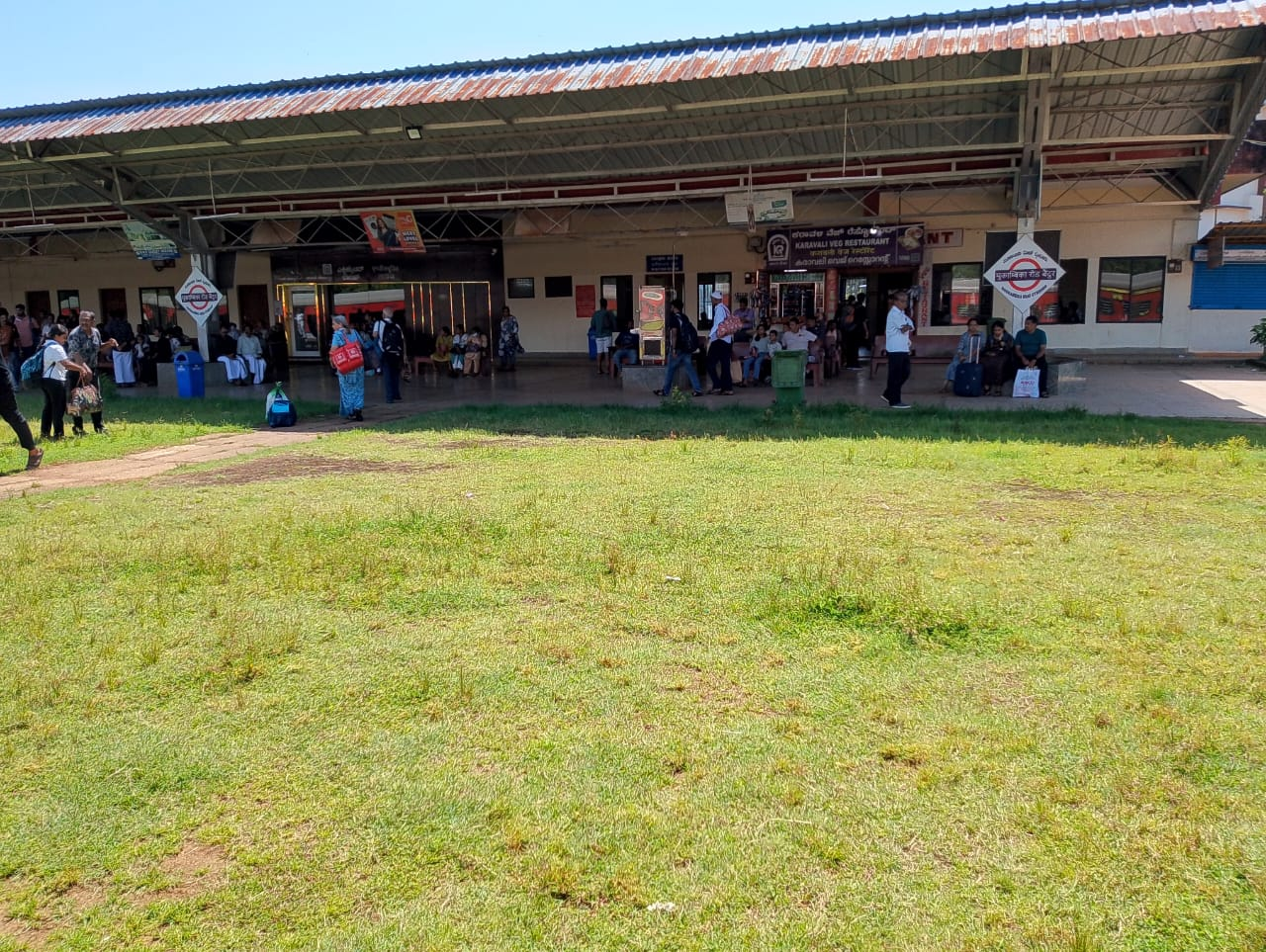
