= Chitrapur railway station =

Railway station in Karnataka, India

General information
- Coordinates: 14.0357°N 74.5361°E
- Owner: Indian Railways
- Line: Konkan Railway

Services
Preceding station	Indian Railways	Following station
Murdeshwar towards Roha	Konkan Railway Konkan Railway	Bhatkal towards Thokur
Route map
Location
- Location within Karnataka

Chitrapur railway station is a halt station on Konkan Railway. The preceding station on the line is Murdeshwar railway station and the next station is Bhatkal railway station.

In superhit Hindi movie Neel Kamal this railway station appears.
