= Bijoor railway station =

Railway station in Karnataka, India

General information
- Coordinates: 13.8220°N 74.6426°E
- Owner: Indian Railways
- Line: Konkan Railway

Other information
- Status: Active
- Station code: BIJR

Services
Preceding station	Indian Railways	Following station
Mookambika Road Byndoor towards Roha	Konkan Railway Konkan Railway	Senapura towards Thokur
Route map
Location
- Location within Karnataka

Bijoor railway station is a station on Konkan Railway Corporation Limited (KRCL) operated railway track. It is at a distance of 632.352 km (392.9 mi) down from Roha, north most starting point of KRCL jurisdiction.Bijoor railway station is in the Udupi district of Karnataka state, India. The preceding station on the line is Mookambika Road Byndoor railway station, and the next station is Senapura railway station. It is the nearest railway station to the villages of Uppunda,Gantihole, Charumakki and Khambadakone.

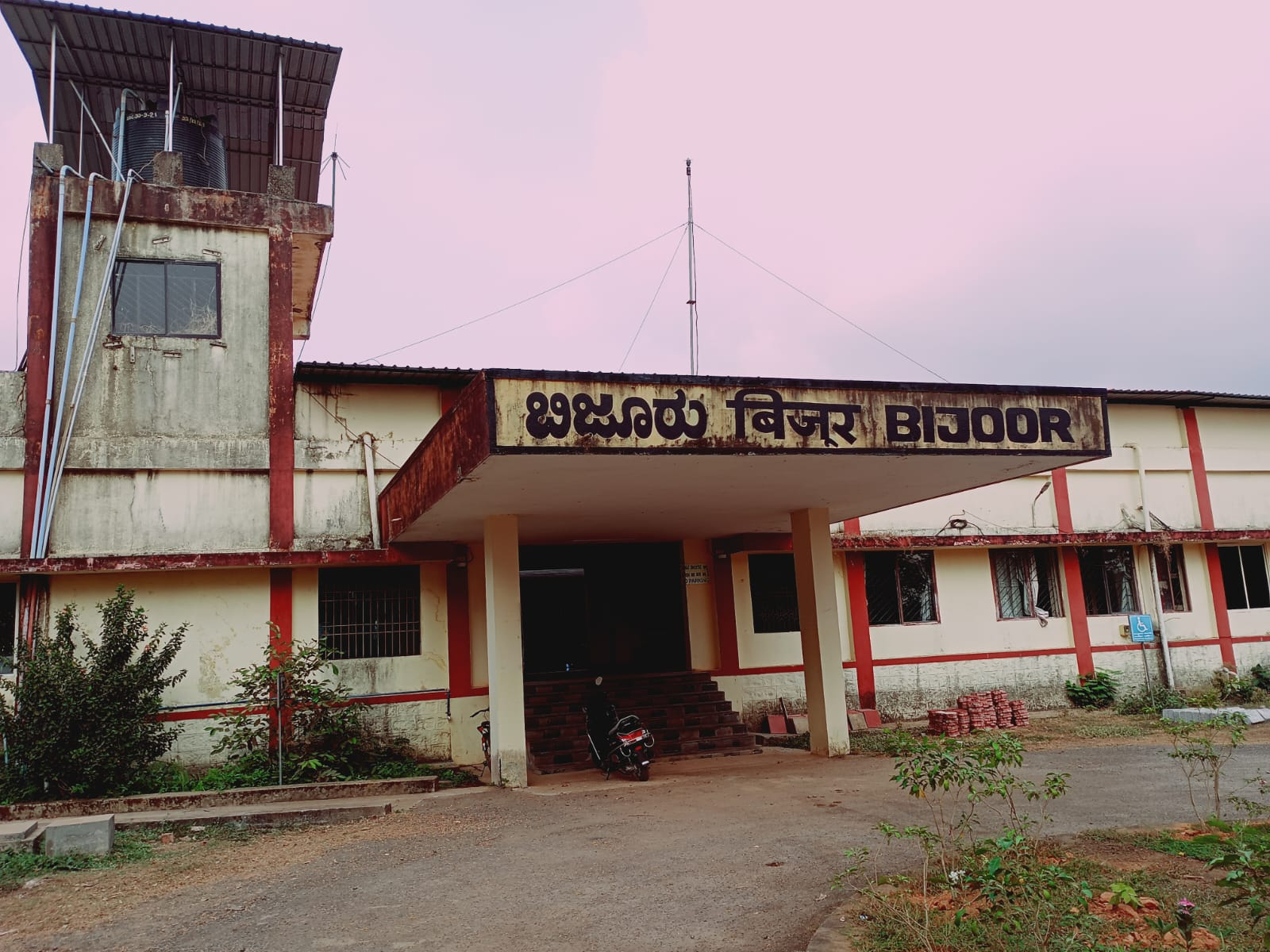
Bijoor Railway Station ( KRCL )
