= Murdeshwar railway station =

Railway station in Karnataka, India

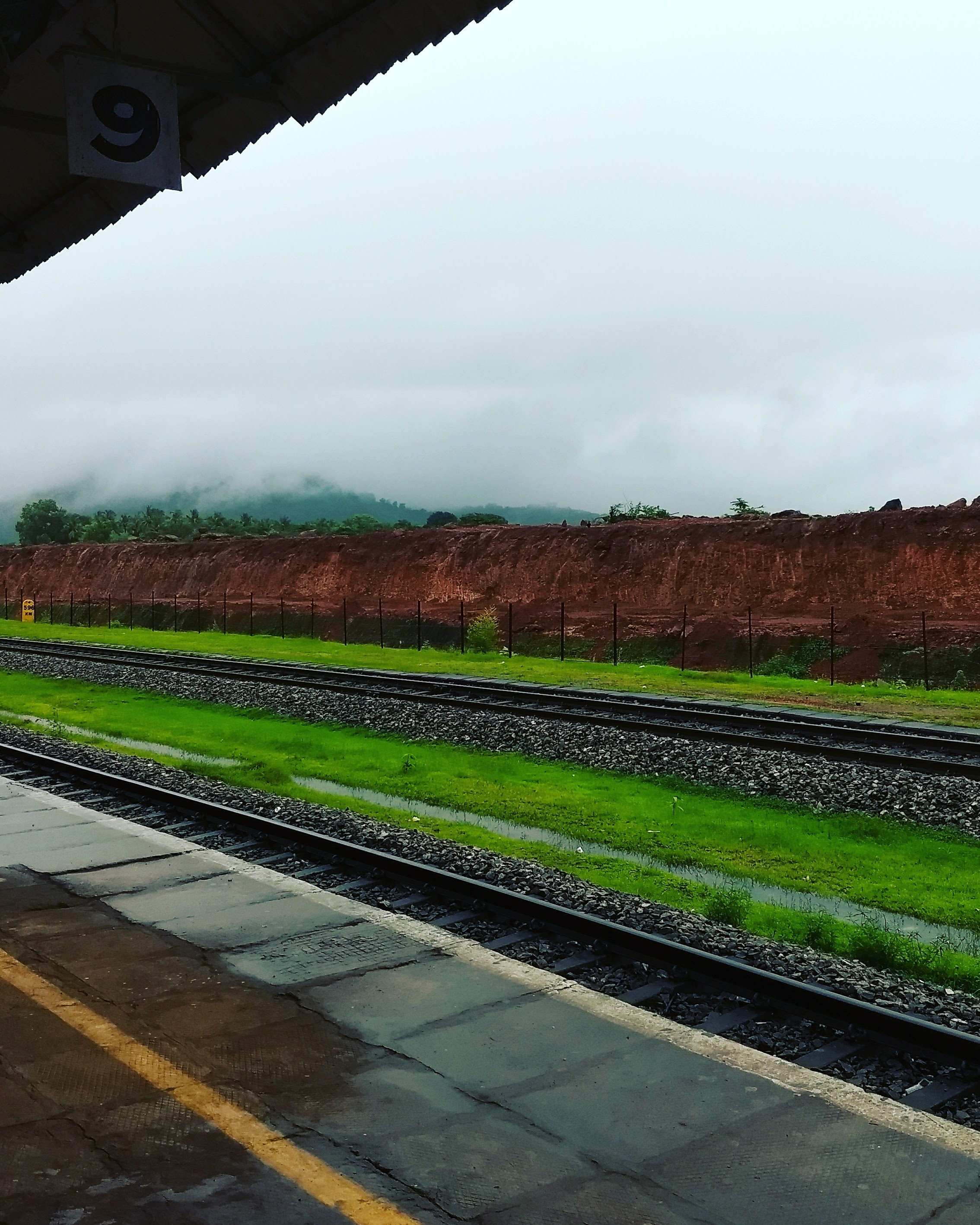
- View from the Murdeshwar Railway Station Platform 1

General information
- Coordinates: 14.1008°N 74.5053°E
- System: Indian Railways Station
- Owner: Indian Railways
- Line: Konkan Railway
- Platforms: 2
- Tracks: 2

Other information
- Status: Active
- Station code: MRDW

Services
Preceding station	Indian Railways	Following station
Manki towards Roha	Konkan Railway Konkan Railway	Chitrapur towards Thokur
Route map
Location
- Location within India Location within Karnataka

Murdeshwar railway station is a station on Konkan Railway. It is at a distance of 596.005 km (370.3 mi) down from origin. The preceding station on the line is Manki railway station and the next station is Chitrapur railway station.

There is proposal to terminate train from Bengaluru to Mangaluru numbered 16585/16586 at Murudeshwara railroad station.
