= Vellarakkad railway station =

Railway station in Kerala India

Vellarakkad
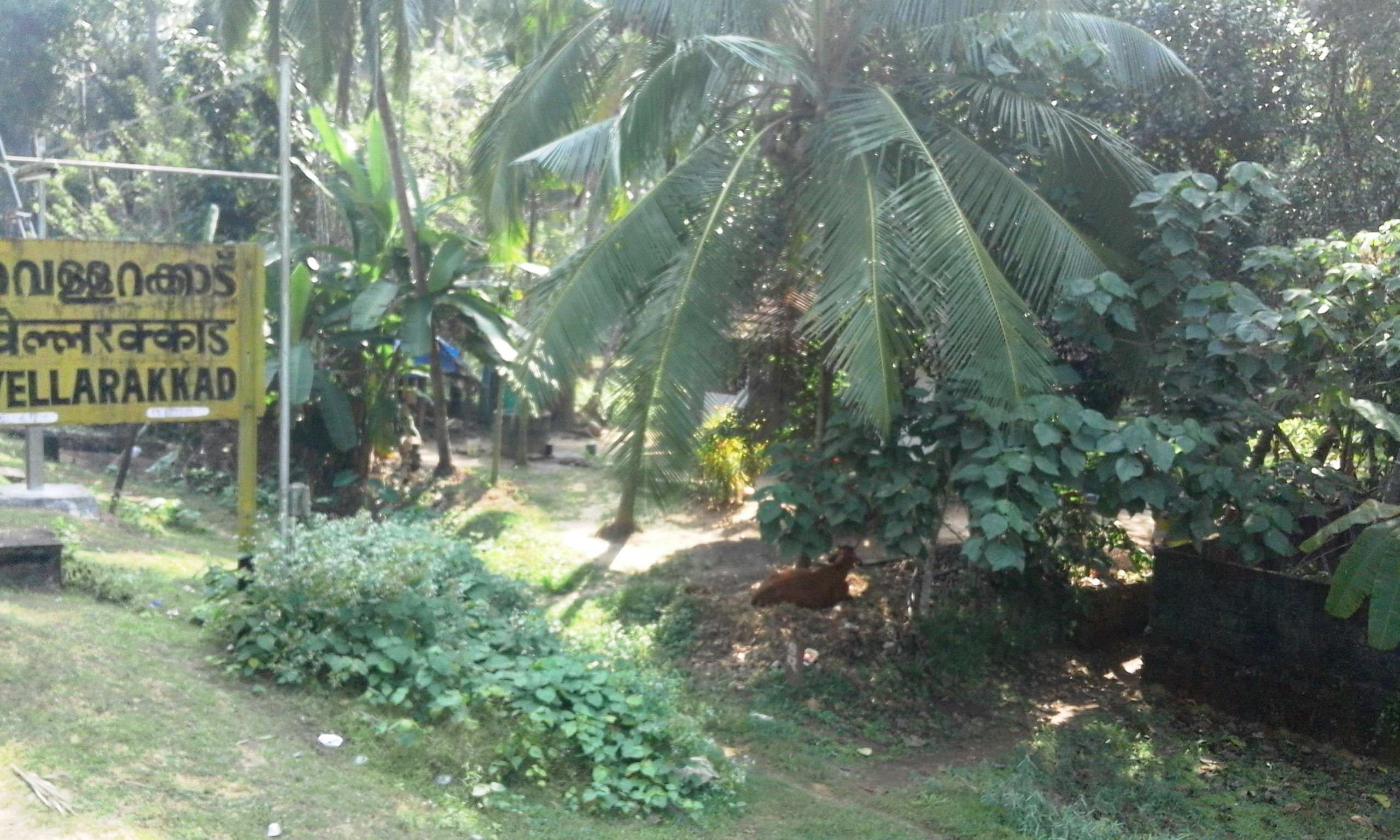
- Vellarakkad railway station

General information
- Location: India
- Coordinates: 11.4722°N 75.6530°E
- System: Regional rail and Light rail station

Other information
- Status: Defunct
- Station code: VEK
- Zone(s): Southern Railway zone
- Division(s): Palakkad
Route map
- Sources
Location
- Location within India Location within Kerala

Vellarakkad Railway Station (Code:VEK) is a major railway station serving the town of Moodadi in the Kozhikode District of Kerala, India. It lies in the Shoranur–Mangalore section of the Southern Railways. Trains halting at the station connect the town to prominent cities in India such as Thiruvananthapuram, Kochi, Chennai, Kollam, Bangalore, Kozhikode, Coimbatore, Mangalore, Mysore and so forth. Amidst protest from regular passengers and organisations like DYFI, on 25 May 2025, Vellarakkad railway station has permanently ceased operations as decided by the Indian Railways. Even though the station stopped operations, Hon. Railways Minister Sri Ashwini Vaishnav committed to resume operations at the Vellarakkad and Chirakkal railway stations at the request of BJP State President Sri Rajeev Chandrasekhar.
