= Shiroor railway station =

Railway station in Karnataka, India

General information
- Coordinates: 13.9309°N 74.5940°E
- Owner: Indian Railways
- Line: Konkan Railway

Other information
- Status: Active
- Station code: SHMI

Services
| Preceding station | Indian Railways | Following station |
|---|---|---|
| Bhatkal towards Roha | Konkan Railway Konkan Railway | Mookambika Road Byndoor towards Thokur |
Route map
Location
- Location within Karnataka

Shiroor railway station is a station in Shiroor village Byndoor, Udupi district, Karnataka) on Konkan Railway. It is at a distance of 618.600 km (384.4 mi) down from origin station Roha. The preceding station on the line is Bhatkal railway station and the next station is Mookambika Road Byndoor railway station.
