= Sharane Sri Danamma Devi =

Indian religious leader

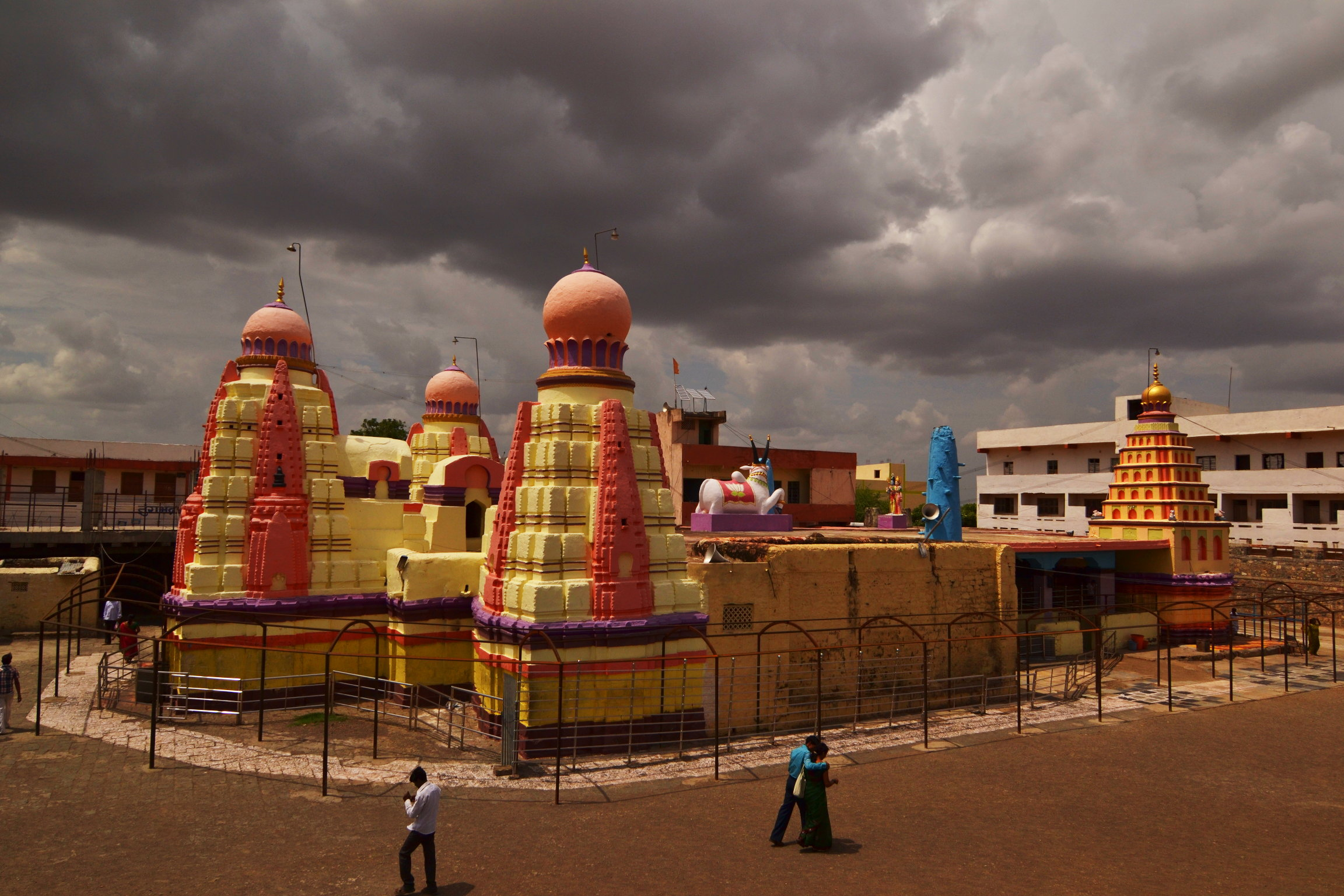
- Guddapur Daneshwari temple premises

Personal life
- Born: Lingamma Umarani, Maharashtra, India
- Died: Guddapur, Maharashtra, India
- Spouse: Sangamanatha
- Known for: Spiritual
- Other names: Daan-Amma, Varadani Danamma
- Website: www.SriDanammaDevi.com

Religious life
- Religion: Hinduism
- Sect: Lingayatism

Sharane Sri Danamma Devi is worshipped as an incarnation (avatar) of Goddess Parvati. Shri Shiva Sharani Danamma Devi was initially called "Lingamma." She was born in Anantaraya and Shirasamma in Maharashtra in a small city (grama) of "Umarani" in Jatta Taluk, 20 miles west of the Bijapur district. Jagajyoti Basavanna foretold her that she would be worshipped worldwide by the name "Danamma Sharane". From then on, Lingamma is popularly called and revered as Danamma (or Daana-Amma). She started solving the problems of people in Kalyana.

After the period of Kalyana Kranti, she turned to her birthplace to her parents, leading her life worshipping "Linga". She was married to a devotee of Shiva called Sangamanatha in Sunga, 12 miles to the north of her village. Both couples later came to Guddapura, 8 miles to the west of Sunga Grama, helping people and donating to those who were needy, which means "DAANA." Hence her name was "Daana-Amma.” There is a temple located in Guddapura of Shri Somesh Waranath where Danamma performed her usual rituals and Linga puja. Knowing her importance, people of specific communities became her followers and trusted her. She is believed to make many miracles even today, showing her presence to those who believe her. She is believed to lend a helping hand to the people who are in difficulty. Wherever there is mention of her name, there is no situation of starving or problems. She's known to be the incarnation (avatar) of goddess Parvati or Adishakti. She always insists people follow Guru Linga Jangama and gave Lingadiksha to worship Lord Shiva. Her miracles are described in 108 Namavali by chanting those; we get power, confidence, overcome our problems from Devi Adishakti. Thousands of people worship Devi by visiting her temple satisfying their wishes; she has also been called "Varadani Danamma". Later she made a journey towards Rameshwaram with her husband, spreading the Vachanas and knowledge of Jagajyoti-Basavanna and built his temple.

Along with her husband, she came to Kambe city. The second rajadhiraja king of Chola Raja's Mandalik learned of her miracles, welcomed her and took a Lingadiksha from her. Then she came to Kudalsangama, where Basavanna was "Aikya" knowing that her parents were out of this world, she turned back to Guddapura. After performing pooja with pleasure, she becomes Aikya in "LINGA" while distributing the prasad. Her body turned to an idol, the Yadav's Vamshas Mahadevarajas kingdom, Sainath Mandalik, known to have built Danamma Devi temple. Her way of leading life was spotless and pure, in the same way still now the rituals and Mahapoojas are performed purely and cleanly. Every year there are fairs during "Chatti Amavasya" and people resolve their problems by Sevas.

A temple was erected after her aikya in Linga (Lord Shiva) in Guddapur, Sangli District, in present-day Maharashtra. Sri Danamma Devi is worshipped as a powerful Goddess with the power to fulfill any of her devotees' wishes and has thus been called 'Daan'-amma Devi.

Sri Danamma Devi has lakhs of followers from the Banajiga, Jangam, Lingayat & the Vishwakarma communities from around the world who regularly visit Guddapur. Temples devoted to the Goddess can be found in Vijayapura(Bijapur), Rabkavi, Haveri, Hubli, Belgaum and Gokak in Karnataka, which attract thousands of pilgrims.

A Kannada film titled - Shri Danamma Devi, based on the mythology of goddess Danamma Devi, produced by A.S. Patil Nadahalli and directed by Chindodi Bangaresh, is also to be released shortly. The music CDs were recently released by the film's music director, Hamsalekha.

== Iniatiative ==
A website dedicated to Sri Danamma Devi (www.SriDanammaDevi.com) was also recently inaugurated in Haveri, Karnataka, on behalf of Sri Danamma Devi Devasthana Trust (R), Haveri, run by Smt. Shobha Rajshekar Magavi and other prominent devotees of Haveri District.

== Daneshwari Temple ==
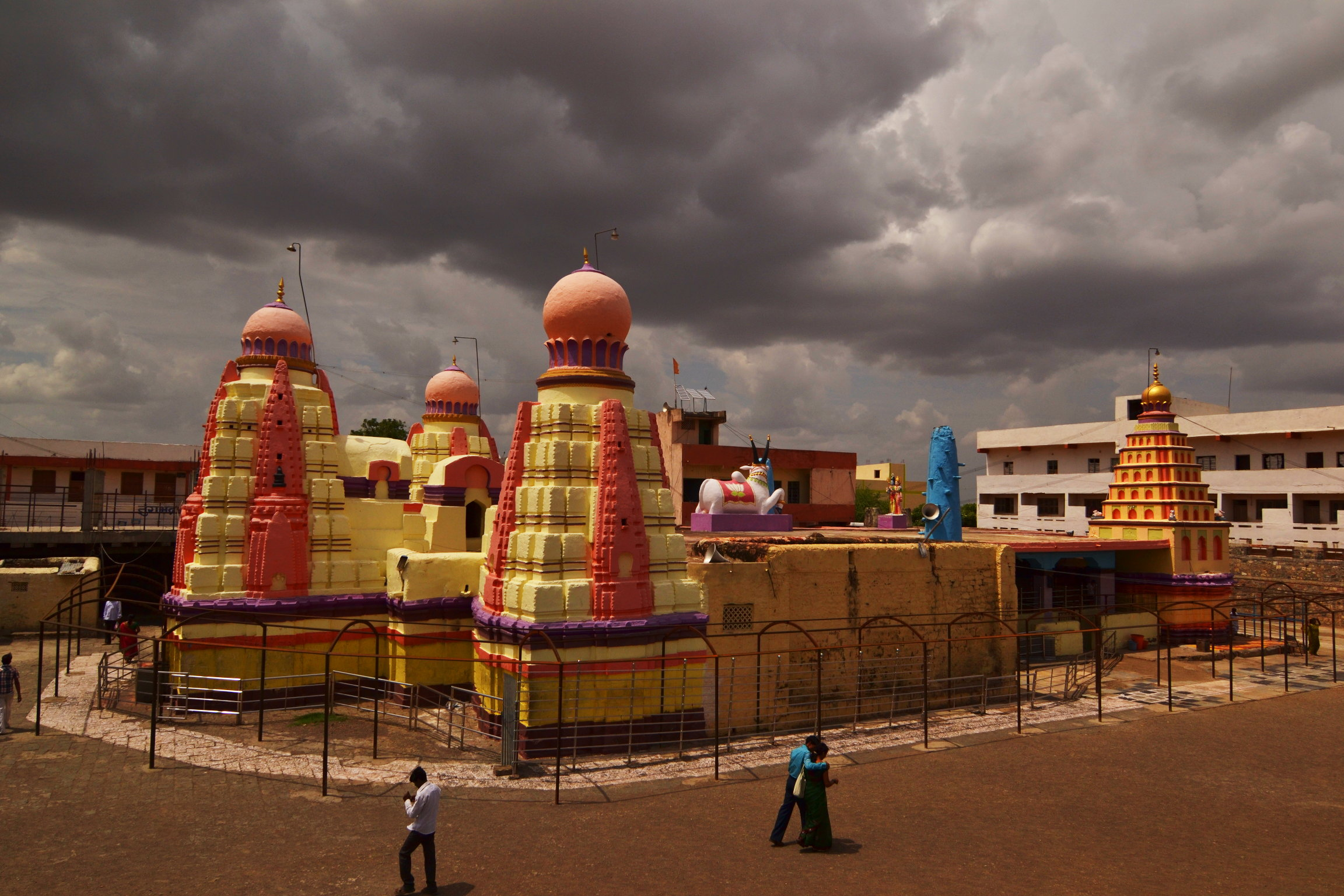
Guddapur Daneshwari temple premises

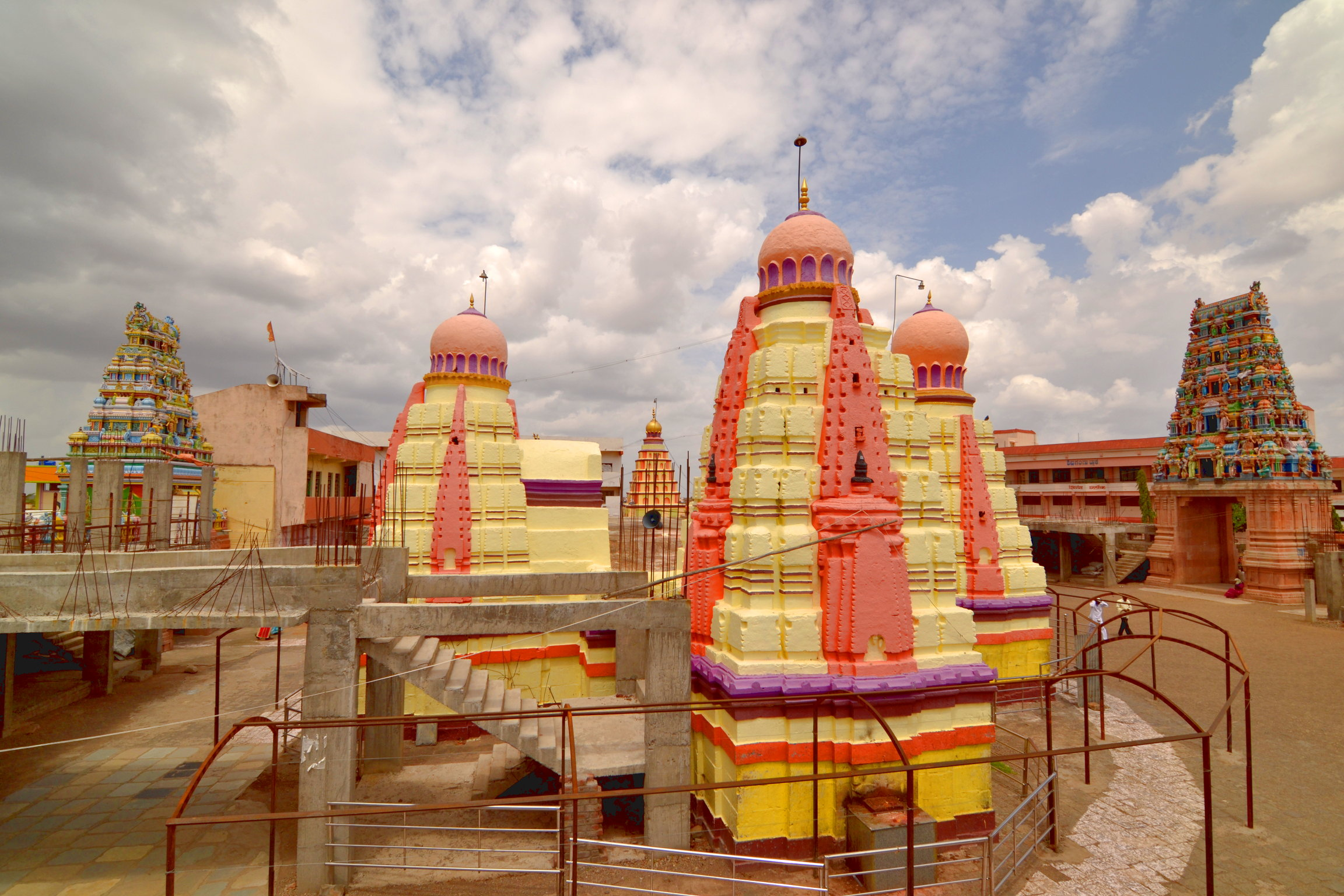
Guddapur Daneshwari temple premises

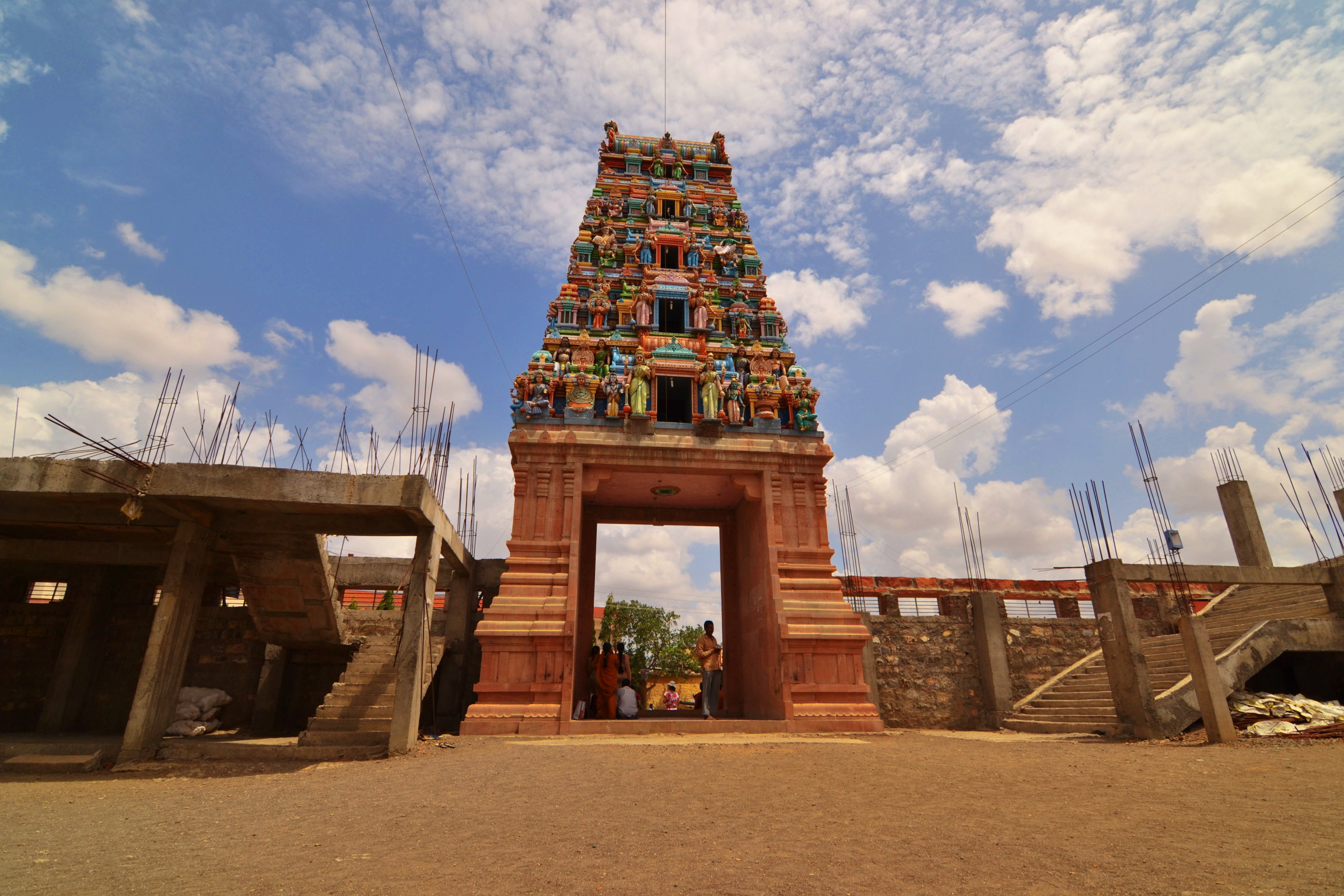
Entrance of the temple
