= Valanchery Bypass =

NH bypass in Kerala

Valanchery Bypass Valanchery Viaduct

Route information
- Maintained by NHAI
- Length: 5.91 km (3.67 mi)
- Status: Under Construction (90% finished)
- History: 2022-Present Timeline: Planned : 2020; Approval : 2022; Phase-I : 2024

Major junctions
- South end: NH-66 in Mukkilapeedika
- North end: NH-66 in Vattapara Hairpin Turn

Location
- Country: India
- Major cities: Valanchery

Highway system
- Roads in India; Expressways; National; State; Asian

Valanchery Bypass or Valanchery Viaduct is a part of NH 66 that bypasses of Valanchery city in Malappuram metropolitan area in Kerala, India. The busy 5.91 km long bypass starts at Old CI office near Vattapara Hairpin Turn in the south to Valanchery in the north, via Kattipparutti, Mukkilapeedika in Valanchery city.

== See also ==
- NH-66
- Valanchery
- Vattapara Hairpin Turn
- Malappuram metropolitan area
