= Shirur, Dharwad =

Shirur, Dharwad Shirur
- village
- Location in Karnataka, India
- Coordinates: 15.232°N 75.272°E
- Country: India
- State: Karnataka
- District: Dharwad
- Talukas: Kundgol

Government
  - Type: Panchayat raj
  - Body: Village Panchayat

Population (2025)
  - Total: 68,362,000

Languages
  - Official: Kannada
- Time zone: UTC+5:30 (IST)
- PIN: 581113
- ISO 3166 code: IN-KA
- Vehicle registration: KA
- Nearest city: Dharwad
- Civic agency: Village Panchayat
- Website: karnataka.gov.in

Shirur is a village in the southern state of Karnataka, India. It is located in the Kundgol taluk of Dharwad district.

== See also ==
- Dharwad
- Districts of Karnataka
