= Uppunda =

Coordinates: 13°50′N 74°37′E

- Village
- Interactive map of Uppunda
- Country: India
- State: Karnataka
- District: Udupi
- Talukas: Byndoor

Government
  - Body: Village Panchayat

Population (2001)
  - Total: 6,258

Languages
  - Official: Kannada
- Time zone: UTC+5:30 (IST)
- Postal code: 576232
- Vehicle registration: KA
- Website: mybyndoor.com

Uppunda is a well- developed large village in Byndoor Taluk with west coast of the village on the Arabian Sea in South India. The nearest city with an airport is Mangalore which is about 119 kilo-meters away. The town is reachable by water and road from Mangalore. The nearest railway stations on Konkan Railway Corporation railway route are Bijoor railway station and Mookambika Road Byndoor railway station (BYNR) railway station. It is located in the Byndoor taluk of Udupi district in Karnataka.

Before 1951 Uppunda was a part of the larger Madras state within the British East India Company empire and was annexed Karnataka in free republic India. Majority of people in town speak Kundagannada dialect of Kannada language and Konkani.

Uppunda is known for the largest temple Shree Durgaparameshwari Temple and for the celebration of Kodi Habba. Uppunda has a beach on the shores of the Arabian sea.

== Activity ==
Fishing is one of the important activities of the local people.

== Demographics ==
As of 2011 India census, Uppunda had a population of 11073 with 5221 males and 5852 females.

== See also ==
- Byndoor
- Kundapura
- Udupi
- Districts of Karnataka
- Kollur
