= Road accidents in Tamil Nadu =

Road collisions in Tamil Nadu, a state in South India, are among the highest in India. In 2013, the state recorded 15,563 fatalities in the 14,504 recorded collisions, the highest for any state in India. The state also topped the list of most collisions in a state for all previous 18 years from 2002 to 2020. According to the report of two experts published in the International Journal of Research in Management and Technology, driving under the influence of alcohol accounts for 82 per cent of collision fatalities in India. A few political leaders have vehemently opposed the state-run TASMAC shops that sell alcohol and have called for a total prohibition of alcohol in the state, but opposing governments have maintained that prohibition would lead to illegal liquor, which in the past has claimed hundred of lives. The increase in number of vehicles from 82 lakh (8.8 million) in 2007 to 1.6 crore (16 million) in 2012 without appreciable change in the road infrastructure is also believed to the reason for most collisions.

== Road collisions ==
Collision data
Year	Collisions	Casualties
2000	8,269	9,300
2001	8,579	9,571
2002	9,012	9,939
2003	8,393	9,275
2004	8,733	9,507
2005	8,844	9,760
2006	10,055	11,009
2007	11,034	12,036
2008	11,813	12,784
2009	12,727	13,746
2010	14,241	15,409
2011	14,359	15,422
2012	15,072	16,175
2013	14,504	15,563
2016	71,431	17,218
2017	65,562	17,926
2018	63,920	18,394
2019	57,228	18,129
2020	45,489	14,527
Footnote: Sources:

According to a report released by the Tamil Nadu Police in 2013, there were a total of 15,563 fatalities in 14,504 recorded collisions. The corresponding number of people sustaining grievous injuries in 4,715 collisions was 6,513, and the number of people who sustained minor injuries was 69,168 in 44,158 collisions. A total of 2,861 people escaped injuries. The state also topped the list of most collisions among all states for all previous ten years from 2002 to 2012. It was estimated that were around eight collisions every hour and a total of 15 percent of all collisions in the country occurred in the state. The data from National Crime Record Bureau indicated that the state capital, Chennai, had 9,663 collisions, the most of any city in India in 2012. During 1990, the state stood second behind Uttar Pradesh in the country with 6,693 recorded collisions.

As per the report published by the State transport authority in 2013, out of 66,238 collisions, two-wheelers were involved in 22,496 collisions, cars, jeeps, taxis and tempos in 18,658, trucks in 9,192, government buses in 3,765, private buses in 3,564, three-wheelers in 2,983 and others in 5,580. As per the same report, 20,686 collisions occurred in national highways, 20,984 in state highways, 17,401 in district roads and remaining 7,167 in village roads.

== Causes ==
The National Police Commission report indicates that the number of collisions is directly proportional to the population density, road length and traffic volume. A report by West Bengal National University of Juridical Science indicated in 1999 that there were not enough traffic police in the state to control and handle collisions. During 1999, the number of collisions involving two-wheelers and three-wheelers doubled in the state compared to 1998, on account of the increased number of auto rickshaws and motorised fish carts.

In 2011–2012, a total of 19,436 cases were filed in the state, while the capital, Chennai, accounted for 3,855 cases. The increase in the number of government-run TASMAC shops (which have a monopoly over wholesale and retail vending of alcoholic beverages) and a corresponding increase in the number of drunk drivers were cited as the major reasons for collisions caused by drunk drivers. According to the report of two experts published in the International Journal of Research in Management and Technology, driving under the influence of alcohol accounts for 70 percent of collision fatalities in India. The state registered the largest increase in number of vehicles from 82 lakh in 2007 to 1.6 crore in 2012 among all states in the country. The increase in the number of vehicles without appreciable change in the road infrastructure is also believed to the reason for most collisions.

According to Tamil Nadu police, the other major reason for the collisions is the increase in the number of vehicles compared to the road length. Some experts believe that the surveillance by traffic police is biased and enforcement of rules alone is not sufficient. Some non-governmental organizations have claimed that urban planning has not kept pace with the increase in number of vehicles. The state-owned buses are also cited as a major cause for the collisions, with a total of 1,300 collisions during 2012.

As per the report published by the state transport authority in 2013, 63,658 were caused by the fault of drivers, 779 by passengers other than driver, 1,007 by pedestrians, 206 by mechanical defects, 140 by road condition, 97 by bad weather and 351 by other reasons.

== Legal implications ==
Drunk driving

"Drunken driving is the most serious menace where road accidents are concerned".

— ~ Karunasagar, Additional Commissioner (Traffic),Symbiotic link between alcohol and crime?, 21 January 2013

The driver involved in a collision is subject to a breathalyzer test to detect alcohol in his blood. If the driver is deemed to be drunk, the vehicle is impounded by the police and a fine is levied to reclaim the vehicle from the court under the jurisdiction of the collision spot. In case of casualties, a case is filed against the driver under Section 304(a) of Indian Penal Code IPC for "culpable homicide not amounting to murder". The driver's license is either suspended or cancelled based on the severity of the collision.

The district police were empowered to levy spot fines against drunk drivers as of February 2012, a practise that had been followed only by city police up to that time.

Some public interest groups allege that collisions causing fatalities were under-reported in Tamil Nadu to ease the processing of insurance claims. They also claim that cases are filed under Section 304(a) of the Indian Penal Code (IPC) and most cases are settled out of court. In 2011 the Supreme Court of India ordered cases of fatal collision caused by drunk drivers to be registered by the state police under IPC Section 304(2) of the IPC (culpable homicide, not amounting to murder), removing the possibility of bail from offenders.

== Awareness ==
The state is the first among the states in India to introduce a road safety policy in 2007. The state also introduced a road safety action plan in 2009 that involved tracking collision records through a Technology called Geographical Information Systems (GIS). The GIS system was accessible to the police in the 1,400 police stations in the state, who entered the collision data. The trends provided by the data was used to identify 3,000 potential collision spots, number of people involved, background of the people involved, timing of the collisions and also the type of collision. The state traffic planning cell and the additional director general of police head the action plan. Placing sign boards, building barriers and improving the street lighting are some of the actions taken based on the inputs from the software.

S. Ramadoss, the leader of Pattali Makkal Katchi, and Vaiko, the leader of Marumalarchi Dravida Munnetra Kazhagam, are two prominent leaders in Tamil Nadu who have vehemently opposed the state-run TASMAC shops in various forums and have called for prohibition of alcohol in the state. Most consumer forums allege that the state government is not moving towards total prohibition as the revenue from the TASMAC shops forms a fifth of the total revenue to the government as of 2013. Both the opposing state governments under Dravida Munnetra Kazhagam (DMK) and All India Anna Dravida Munnetra Kazhagam (AIADMK) are against the closing of the shops, stating prohibition would come at a big risk of illicit liquor, which in the past has claimed several hundred lives. According to the Tamil Nadu police, though consumption of alcohol results in major crimes and collisions, total prohibition may lead to other potential issues like black market trade. The police have recommended stricter traffic laws and introduction of smart cards to record the crime history of the drivers electronically. The state police stated during 2012 that public awareness was created and the officers were educated to improve reaction time to emergencies.
