= National Highway 965G (India) =

National highway in India

National Highway 965G
- Map of National Highway 965G in red

Route information
- Auxiliary route of NH 65
- Length: 223 km (139 mi)

Major junctions
- North end: Patas
- South end: Jath

Location
- Country: India
- States: Maharashtra

Highway system
- Roads in India; Expressways; National; State; Asian
← NH 65	→ NH 166E

National Highway 965G, commonly referred to as NH 965G is a national highway in India. It is a spur road of National Highway 65. NH-965G traverses the state of Maharashtra in India.

== Route ==
Patas, Baramati, Indapur, Akluj, Velapur, Sangola, Bhalwani, Kadlas, Jat.

== Junctions ==
NH 65 Terminal near Patas.
NH 166E Terminal near Jat.

== See also ==
- List of national highways in India
- List of national highways in India by state
