= Shirur, Belgaum =

Shirur
- Village
- Country: India
- State: Karnataka
- District: Belgaum
- Talukas: Athani

Government
  - Type: Panchayat raj

Languages
  - Official: Kannada
- Time zone: UTC+5:30 (IST)

Shirur (Belgaum) is a village in Belgaum district of Karnataka, India.
