= Moodadi =

- village
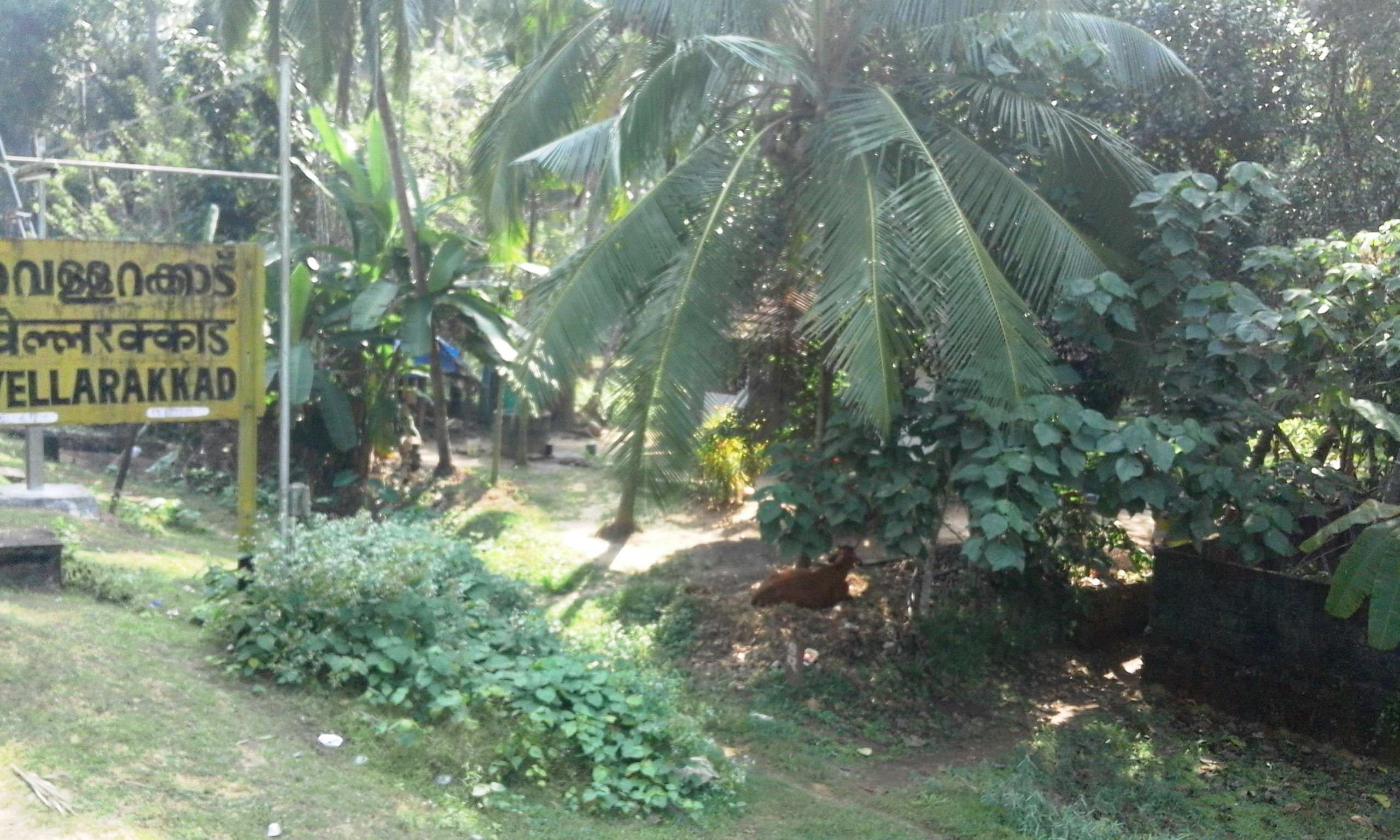
- Vellarakkad Railway Station, Moodadi
- Interactive map of Moodadi
- Coordinates: 11°28′10″N 75°39′25″E
- Country: India
- State: Kerala
- District: Kozhikode

Population (2011)
  - Total: 30,170

Languages
  - Official: Malayalam, English
- Time zone: UTC+5:30 (IST)
- Vehicle registration: KL-56

Moodadi is a village in Koyilandy taluk of Kozhikode district in the state of Kerala, India.

== Railway Station ==
The nearest railway station is Vellarakkad on the Shoranur - Mangalore line. Villagers mainly use buses for public transport.

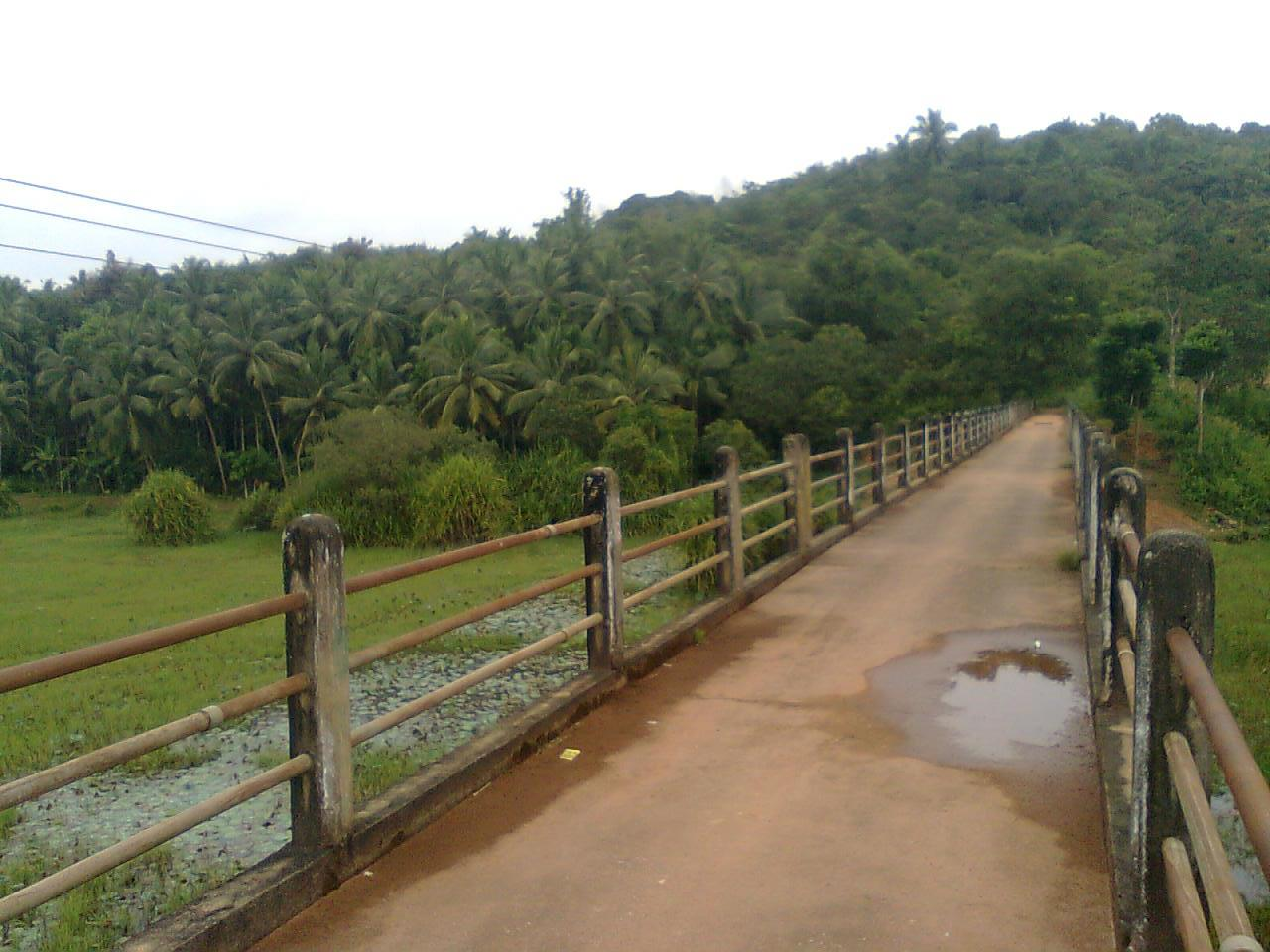
Parakkad

== Demographics ==
As of 2011 India census, Moodadi had a population of 30,170, with 13,910 males and 16,260 females.

== Schools ==
Around ten primary schools are there in Moodadi village, providing training in both Malayalam and English medium. Veemangalam UP School in Moodadi is well-known for its Youth Green Community activities.

== Transportation ==
Moodadi village connects to other parts of India through Koyilandy town. The nearest airports are at Kannur and Kozhikode. The nearest railway station is at Koyiandy. The national highway no.66 passes through Koyilandy and the northern stretch connects to Mangalore, Goa and Mumbai. The southern stretch connects to Cochin and Trivandrum. The eastern National Highway No.54 going through Kuttiady connects to Mananthavady, Mysore and Bangalore.

== See also ==
- Chengottukavu
- Naduvannur
- Arikkulam
- Thikkodi
- Chemancheri
- Kappad
- Atholi
- Ulliyeri
- Cheekilode
- Nochad
- Koyilandy
- Vellarakkad railway station
