= Maravanthe =

Badabail Maravanthe
- Village
- Maravanthe beach

- Location in Karnataka, India Badabail Maravanthe (India)
- Country: India
- State: Karnataka
- District: Udupi
- Taluk: Byndoor

Languages
  - Official Languages: Kannada
- Time zone: UTC+5:30 (IST)
- PIN: 576224
- Website: www.maravanthe.in

Maravanthe is a village and a beach in Byndoor Taluk, Udupi District, Karnataka, India.

NH-66 (formerly NH-17) runs next to the beach and the Souparnika River flows on the other side of the road. Outlook traveller said it is one of Karnataka's most beautiful beaches.

The Suparnika River, which almost touches the Arabian Sea there, makes a U-turn and goes westward to join the sea after a journey of nearly more than 10 km (6.2 mi).

Senapura railway station on Konkan Railway Corporation Limited(KRCL) train route is the nearest railway station to Marawante beach.

== Economy ==
Fishing is the main activity. The infrastructure for marketing the seafood is not well developed.

== Tourism ==
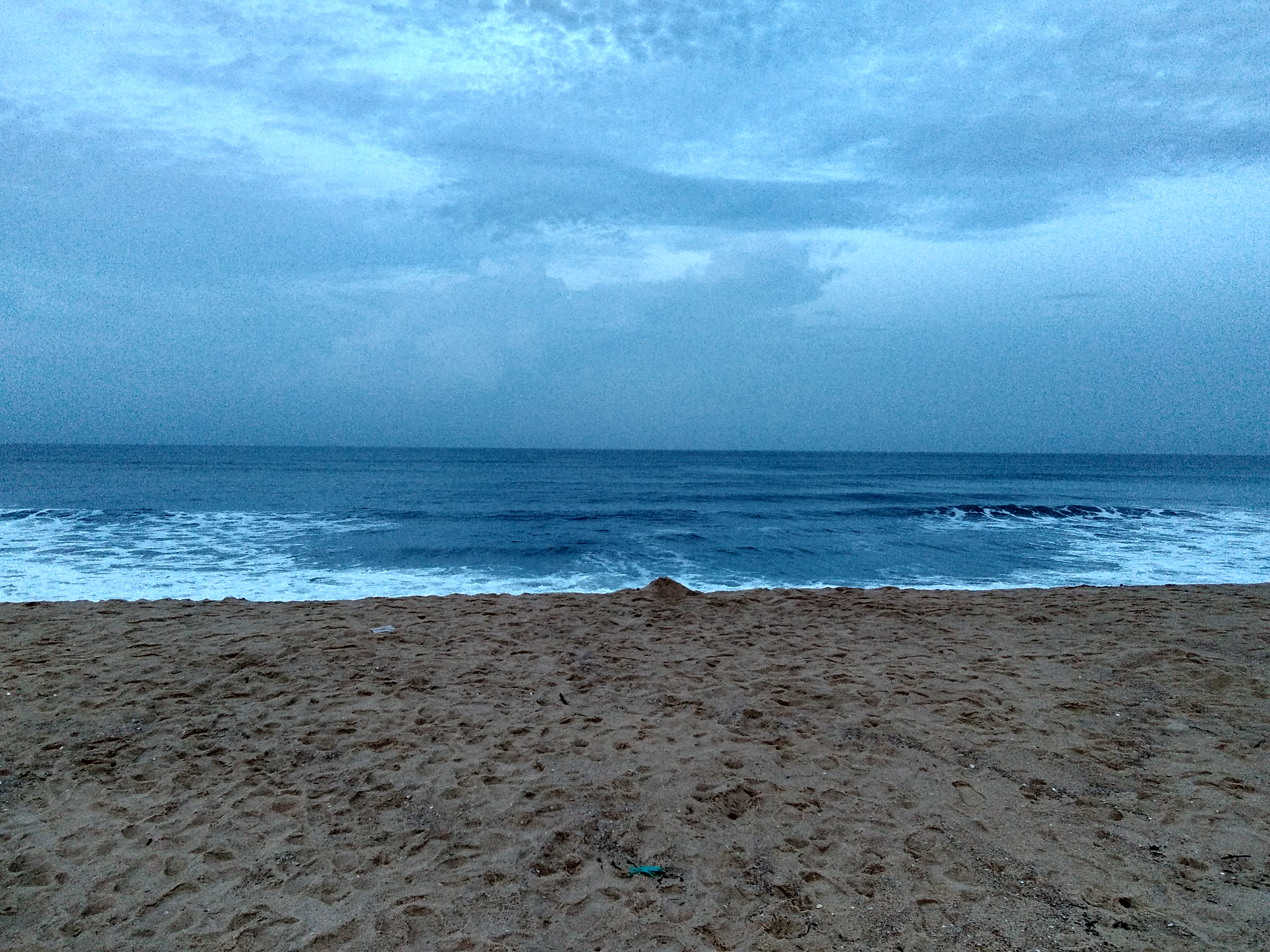
Maravanathe Beach at dawn

The Maravanthe beach is nicknamed Virgin Beach. It has been identified by government agencies as having potential for tourism with leaflets proclaiming several facilities. Home stays and resorts are available near by.Karnataka Bank has a branch at Trasi which is few hundred metres away from Maravante.

At the nearby Gangolli port, tourists can join fishermen in their fishing trips.

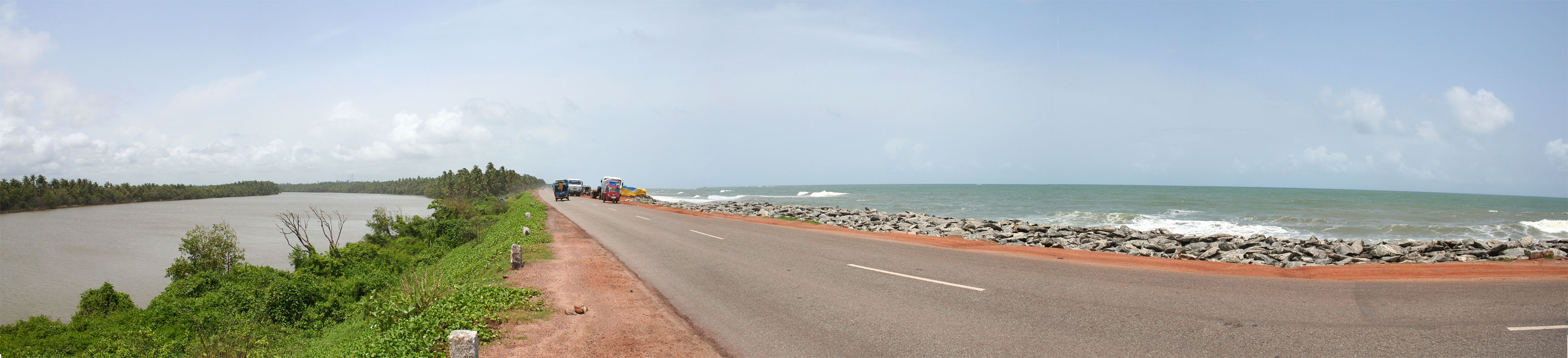
NH66 near Maravanthe
