= 33 Shiroor =

- village
- Location in Karnataka, India 33 Shiroor (India)
- Coordinates: 13.3490900°N 74.928230°E
- Country: India
- State: Karnataka
- District: Udupi
- Taluk: Udupi

Government
  - Body: Gram panchayat

Area
  - Total: 18 km^{2} (6.9 sq mi)

Population (2001)
  - Total: 2,092
  - Density: 120/km^{2} (300/sq mi)

Languages
  - Official: Kannada
- Time zone: UTC+5:30 (IST)
- Postal code: 576223
- ISO 3166 code: IN-KA
- Vehicle registration: KA
- 2011 census code: 608784
- Nearest city: Udupi
- Civic agency: Village Panchayat
- Website: karnataka.gov.in

33 Shiroor is a village in the southern state of Karnataka, India. It is located on the banks of the Seetha River in the Udupi taluk of Udupi district, Karnataka.

== See also ==
- Udupi
- Districts of Karnataka
