= Jat, Sangli =

Jat
- Tehsil
- Location in Maharashtra Jat (India)
- Coordinates: 17°3′N 75°13′E
- Country: India
- State: Maharashtra
- District: Sangli

Government
  - Body: Municipality

Area
  - Total: 2,258.28 km^{2} (871.93 sq mi)

Population (2011)
  - Total: 327,747
  - Density: 145.131/km^{2} (375.888/sq mi)
- Demonym: Jatkar
- Time zone: UTC+5:30 (IST)
- PIN: 416-404
- Telephone code: +91-2344
- Vehicle registration: MH-10, MH-59
- Coastline: 0 kilometres (0 mi)
- Literacy: 83.83%
- Climate: Sunny
- Avg. summer temperature: 25–40 °C (77–104 °F)
- Avg. winter temperature: 20–27 °C (68–81 °F)

Jat is a town and taluka headquarters in Miraj subdivision of Sangli district in southern Maharashtra.

== History ==
Jat was the capital of a former Maratha jagir ruled by Dafales. Most of the dynasty period it was affiliated with Bijapur. For some time it was associated with Kolhapur as well as Satara Maratha dynasties. Later, Jat became a non-salute princely state until 8 March 1948 and then joined the Dominion of India. Then it was part of Satara district. When the Sangli district was formed, Jat became the eastern tahasil of Sangli.

Freedom fighter Sindhura Lakshmana was born in Sindhur village of Jath taluka. Lakshmana (1898–1922) fought against the British colonial government in India. He is remembered as a popular rebel hero and freedom fighter in Karnataka. Several films, plays and theatrical performances depict his life and deeds.

A Kannada film, Veera Sindhoora Lakshmana, released in 1977, depicts his rebellion and struggle against the British.

== Culture ==
Yallamma temple is situated to the south of Jat. It celebrates an annual fair on Chaitra Paurnima (Full Moon) in the month of Margashirsha. It also hosts one of the largest cattle fairs in southern Maharashtra and northern Karnataka.

The Sharane Sri Danamma Devi temple is situated in Guddapur, a village in Jat taluka. Danamma is also called "Varadaani Guddamma". She was a Kannada Sharane, a staunch follower of Lingayatism in the 12th century. Her birthplace was Umarani in Jath taluka. She married in the village of Sangteertha near Valsang. Finally she received moksha in Guddapur. Every year lakhs of devotees, especially from Karnataka, visit this place, which has now become a pilgrimage center.

Daridev temple is located southwest of Jat, near Muchandi village. Its annual fair is celebrated in the second week of April each year.

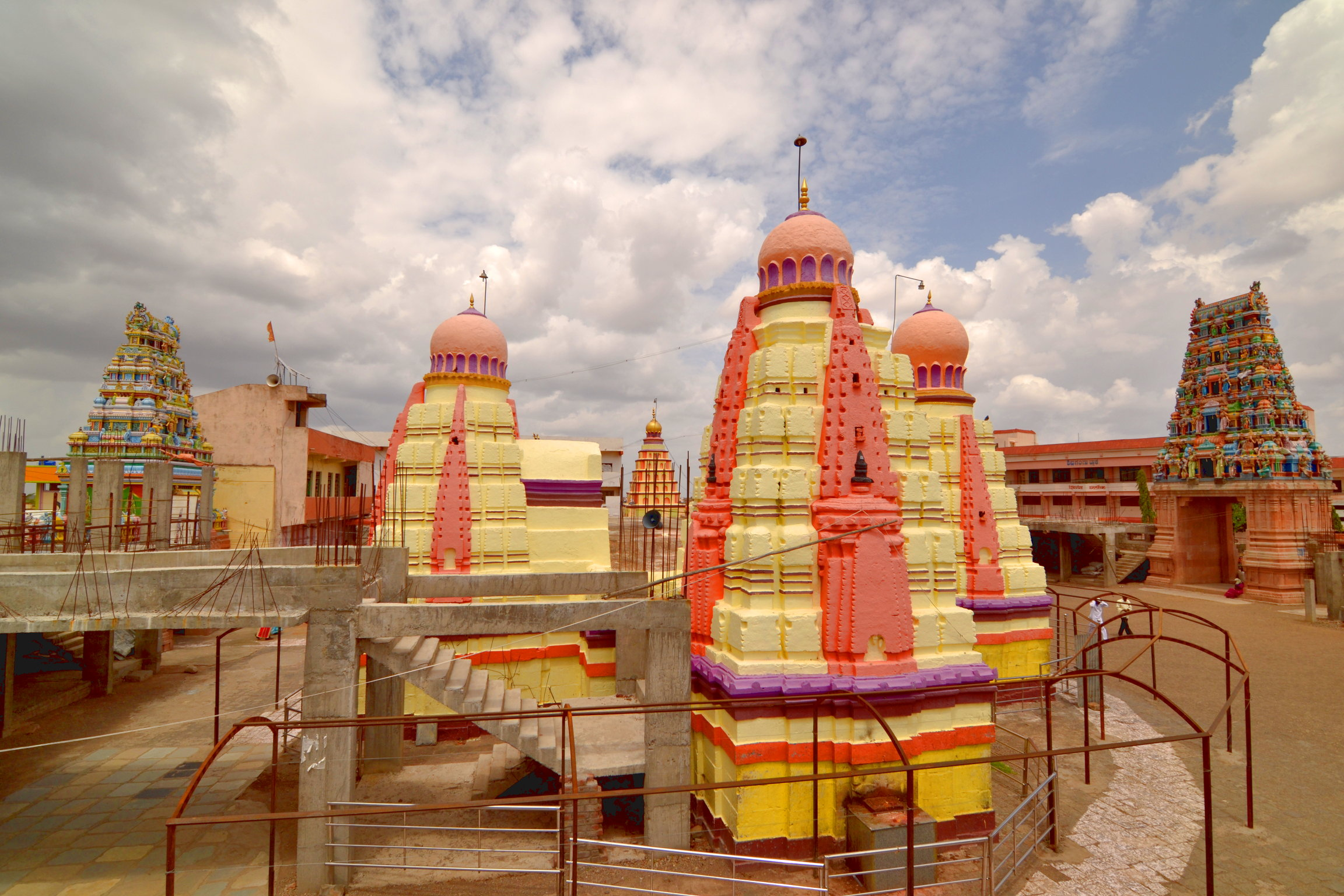
Guddapur Daneshwari temple premises

Near the city, a temple of Ambabai sits on a hill. The temple celebrates its annual fair in the Navaratra. Many Halegannada (old Kannada) inscriptions are found in villages like Valasang, Kudnur, Mallal, Balgaon, and Wajrwad. Most of these inscriptions are from Kalchuri Chalukyas.

== Demographics ==
Religions in Jat taluk (2011)
Religion	Percent
Hinduism	92.29%
Islam	6.53%
Buddhism	0.68%
Other or not stated	0.50%

According to the 2011 census, Jat taluka has a population of 327,747. The male population is 168,493 and the female population is 159,254. The sex ratio of Jat taluka is 945 females per 1000 males. Jat taluka has an average literacy rate of 71.63%, lower than the national average of 74%; with male literacy of 81% and female literacy of 62%. Scheduled Castes and Scheduled Tribes make up 12.47% and 1.22% of the population respectively.

Marathi is the official language whereas Kannada is the major spoken language in the eastern and southern portions of the taluka, bordering Karnataka. There are around 128 Kannada primary schools and 48 Kannada high schools in Jat taluka. This taluka has most Kannada middle schools in Maharashtra.

Languages of Jat taluk (2011)
1. Marathi (59.1%)
2. Kannada (33.4%)
3. Hindi (3.84%)
4. Urdu (1.82%)
5. Others (1.88%)

At the time of the 2011 census, 59.06% of the population spoke Marathi, 33.40% Kannada, 3.84% Hindi and 1.82% Urdu as their first language.

== Transportation ==
Government of Maharashtra recently approved New RTO office at Jat giving registration number MH-59

=== Nearest international airports ===
- Pune International Airport - 290 km (180 mi)
- Mumbai International Airport - 470 km (290 mi)

=== Nearest domestic airport ===
- Kolhapur Airport - 136 km (85 mi)

=== Main railway stations (CR) ===
- Jatroad Railway Station Walekhindi - 20 km (12 mi)
- Miraj Junction railway station - 78.2 km (48.6 mi)
- Vijayapura (Bijapur) railway station - 66 km (41 mi)
