= Kavalkinaru =

Kavalkinaru Vilakku
- Town
- Nickname: Kavai
- Location in Tamil Nadu, India
- Coordinates: 8.276°N 77.581°E
- Country: India
- State: Tamil Nadu
- District: Tirunelveli district

Languages
  - Official: Tamil
- Time zone: UTC+5:30 (IST)
- PIN Code: 627105

Kavalkinaru is a village panchayat in the Tirunelveli district of Tamil Nadu. It is located 24 km (15 Miles) from Nagercoil, 69 km (43 Miles) from Tirunelveli, and 99 km from Trivandrum International Airport. The nearest port, Tuticorin Port Trust, (also known as V.O.Chidambaram Port), is 111 km from Kavalkinaru. The town, once dependent on agriculture, livestock, stone mining, flower cultivation and the processing of Borassus (Palmyra Tree – பனை மரம்), is now embracing new technologies and professions. The high tunneling-effect of the Western Ghats has enabled this region to be a major Wind Power generation area for India, with thousands of windmills. There are also the test facilities for ISRO Propulsion Complex, a part of Indian Space Research Organisation (ISRO), on the lower slopes of the Mahendragiri mountain near Kavalkinaru.

== History ==
This region was predominantly ruled by the majestic Pandyan Dynasty, as their kingdom was established from the south of the Kaveri River till Kanyakumari. The name originated from the well that provided fresh water for the soldiers of the Cheras, Cholas, and Pandiyas kingdoms, which is still preserved in the town.

== Kavalkinaru Junction ==
Kavalkinaru Junction adds to Kavakinaru's growth in many ways. National Highway 44, which connects Varanasi and Kanyakumari, bypasses through the center of this junction, making it a trade point in the entire region. Almost all basic facilities can be availed from the junction.

There is a vegetable market, 'Kamaraj Market,' situated beside the junction. The market attracts traders from all the regions of Tamil Nadu, making it a prime hub for trade and distribution to the Tirunelveli district. Vegetables are supplied to the adjacent state of Kerala.

== Landmarks ==
As Kavalkinaru is set in the high tunneling-effect region in the Western Ghats it has enabled this entire region to be a huge Wind Power generation region in India. Hence, there are thousands of Windmills deployed in this region to generate safe energy. The Central Government of India has constructed the test facilities for ISRO Propulsion Complex, a part of Indian Space Research Organisation (ISRO), on the lower slopes of the Mahendragiri mountain near Kavalkinaru.

Kavalkinaru has a well constructed Railway Station (now defunct) where the Chennai-Kanyakumari line runs on; passenger trains used to stop at Kavalkinaru Railway Station in its early days.

There are two ponds in Kavalkinaru both the ponds usually are full during the Monsoon, these ponds are not used for drinking water but they are used for irrigation and cleaning the Cattle.

Indian National Congress leader and the former chief minister of Tamil Nadu Bharat Ratna K. Kamaraj, has two statues, one in the centre of their landscape and the other statue at Kavalkinaru Junction.

== Notable people ==
The growth of the village is also supported by local leaders like M. Appavu who is also the Speaker of Tamilnadu Legislative Assembly. The other M.L.A of this region is S. Michael Rayappan a film producer by producing films like "Naadodigal", "Goripalayam" and "Sindhusamaveli" under Global Infotainments banner. Tamil movie Kovil (film) was also shot in Kavalkinaru
