= Shiroor =

- Country: India
- State: Karnataka
- District: Udupi
- Taluka: Byndoor

Population (2011)
  - Total: 20,432
- Time zone: UTC+5:30
- PIN: 576228
- Telephone code: 08254
- Vehicle registration: KA-20
- 2011 census code: 608660

Shiroor is a village in Byndoor Taluk in the state of Karnataka, India.
