= SSS Hubballi–Bengaluru City Superfast Express =

Train in India

SSS Hubballi - KSR Bengaluru City Superfast Express
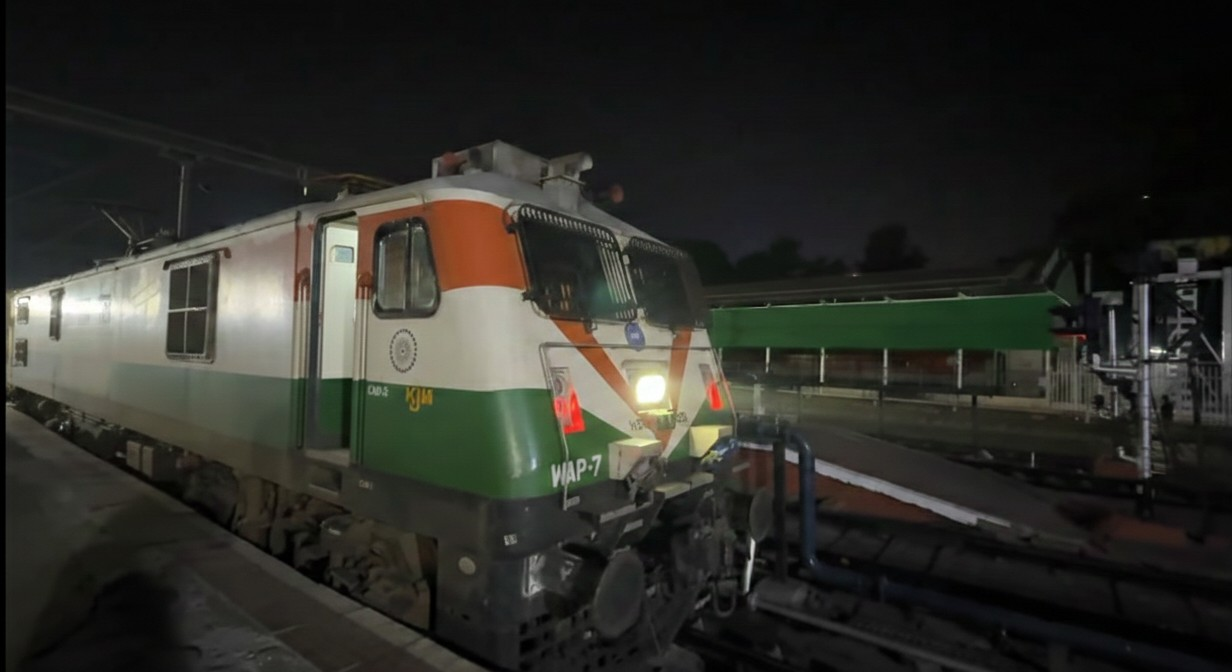
- SBC - UBL SF Express standing at Bengaluru City Junction

Overview
- Service type: Superfast
- Status: Active
- Locale: Karnataka
- First service: 8 December 2025; 8 months ago
- Current operator: South Western Railway (SWR)

Route
- Termini: SSS Hubballi Junction (UBL); Bengaluru City Junction (SBC)
- Stops: 9
- Distance travelled: 470 km (292 mi)
- Average journey time: 7h 35m
- Service frequency: Daily
- Train number: 20687 / 20688

On-board services
- Classes: AC 2 tier, AC 3 tier, Sleeper class
- Seating arrangements: No
- Sleeping arrangements: Yes
- Catering facilities: E-catering
- Observation facilities: Large windows
- Baggage facilities: No
- Other facilities: Below the seats

Technical
- Rolling stock: LHB coach
- Track gauge: 1,676 mm (5 ft 6 in)
- Operating speed: 62 km/h (39 mph) average including halts.

The 20687 / 20688 SSS Hubballi–KSR Bengaluru City Superfast Express is an Superfast express train belonging to South Western railway zone that runs between SSS Hubballi Junction and KSR Bengaluru City Junction in India.

== Schedule ==
• 20687 - 11:15 PM [SSS Hubballi]

• 20688 - 11:55 PM [KSR Bengaluru City]

== Routes and halts ==
The Important Halts of the train are :

● SSS Hubballi Junction

● SMM Haveri

● Ranibennur

● Davangere

● Birur Junction

● Arsikere Junction

● Tumkur

● Yesvantpur Junction

● KSR Bengaluru City Junction

== Traction ==
As the entire route is fully electrified it is hauled by a Krishnarajapuram Loco Shed-based WAP-7 electric locomotive from SSS Hubballi Junction to KSR Bengaluru City Junction and vice versa.

== Rake Reversal/Share ==
There is no rake Reversal or rake share.

== See also ==
Trains from SSS Hubballi Junction :

1. SSS Hubballi–Pune Vande Bharat Express
2. SSS Hubballi–Hazrat Nizamuddin Superfast Express
3. Hampi Express
4. KSR Bengaluru–Hubli Jan Shatabdi Express
5. SSS Hubballi–MGR Chennai Central Superfast Express

Trains from KSR Bengaluru City Junction :

1. KSR Bengaluru–Coimbatore Uday Express
2. Bangalore City–Ajmer Garib Nawaz Express
3. KSR Bangalore–Gandhidham Express
4. Belagavi (Belgaum)–KSR Bengaluru Vande Bharat Express
5. Bangalore Rajdhani Express

== Notes ==
a. Runs daily in a week with both directions.
