= SSS Hubballi–Hazrat Nizamuddin Superfast Express =

Train in India

SSS Hubballi - Hazrat Nizamuddin Superfast Express
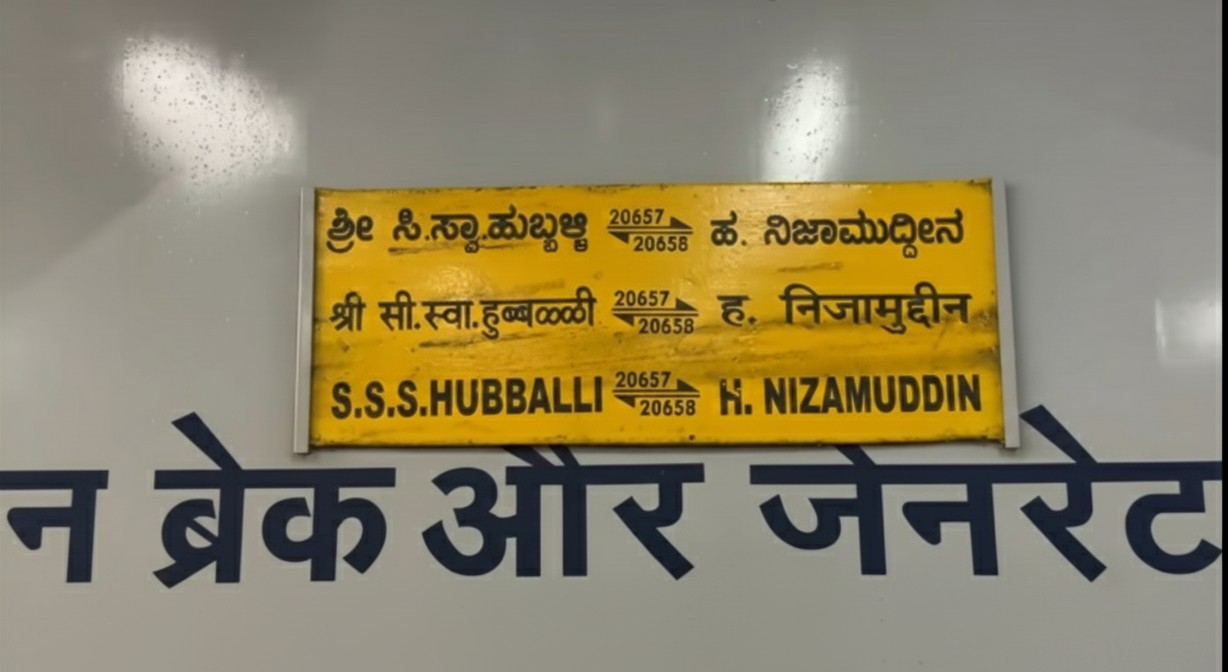

Overview
- Service type: Superfast
- Status: Active
- Locale: Karnataka, Maharashtra, Madhya Pradesh, Uttar Pradesh & New Delhi
- First service: 14 October 2022; 4 years ago
- Current operator: South Western Railway (SWR)

Route
- Termini: SSS Hubballi Junction (UBL); Hazrat Nizamuddin (NZM)
- Stops: 19
- Distance travelled: 2,062 km (1,281 mi)
- Average journey time: 34h 50m
- Service frequency: Weekly
- Train number: 20657 / 20658

On-board services
- Classes: AC 2 tier, AC 3 tier, AC 3 Class Economy, Sleeper class
- Seating arrangements: No
- Sleeping arrangements: Yes
- Catering facilities: E-catering, Pantry Car, On-board Catering
- Observation facilities: Large windows
- Baggage facilities: No
- Other facilities: Below the seats

Technical
- Rolling stock: LHB coach
- Track gauge: 1,676 mm (5 ft 6 in)
- Operating speed: 59 km/h (37 mph) average including halts.

The 20657 / 20658 SSS Hubballi–Hazrat Nizamuddin Superfast Express is an Superfast express train belonging to South Western railway zone that runs between SSS Hubballi Junction and Hazrat Nizamuddin in India.

== Schedule ==
• 20657 - 11:50 PM [SSS Hubballi]

• 20658 - 3:55 PM [Hazrat Nizamuddin]

== Routes and halts ==
The Important Halts of the train are :

- SSS Hubballi Junction
- Gadag Junction
- Badami
- Bagalkot
- Basavana Bagewadi Road
- Vijayapura
- Solapur
- Kurduwadi Junction
- Daund Junction
- Ahilyanagar Junction
- Kopargaon
- Manmad Junction
- Bhusaval Junction
- Itarsi Junction
- Rani Kamalapati
- Veerangana Laxmibai Junction
- Gwalior Junction
- Agra Cantt
- Hazrat Nizamuddin

== Traction ==
As the entire route is fully electrified it is hauled by a Hubballi Loco Shed-based WAP-7 electric locomotive from SSS Hubballi Junction to Hazrat Nizamuddin and vice versa.

== Rake reversal ==
The train will reverse 1 time :

1. Gadag Junction

== See also ==
Trains from SSS Hubballi Junction :

1. SSS Hubballi–Bengaluru City Superfast Express
2. Hampi Express
3. SSS Hubballi–Pune Vande Bharat Express
4. KSR Bengaluru–Hubli Jan Shatabdi Express
5. SSS Hubballi–MGR Chennai Central Superfast Express

Trains from Hazrat Nizamuddin :

1. Hazrat Nizamuddin–Pune Duronto Express
2. CSMT Kolhapur–Hazrat Nizamuddin Superfast Express
3. Hazrat Nizamuddin–Thiruvananthapuram Rajdhani Express
4. Gatiman Express
5. Hazrat Nizamuddin–Khajuraho Vande Bharat Express

== Notes ==
a. Runs 1 day in a week with both directions.
