= Vishwamanava Express =

Train in India

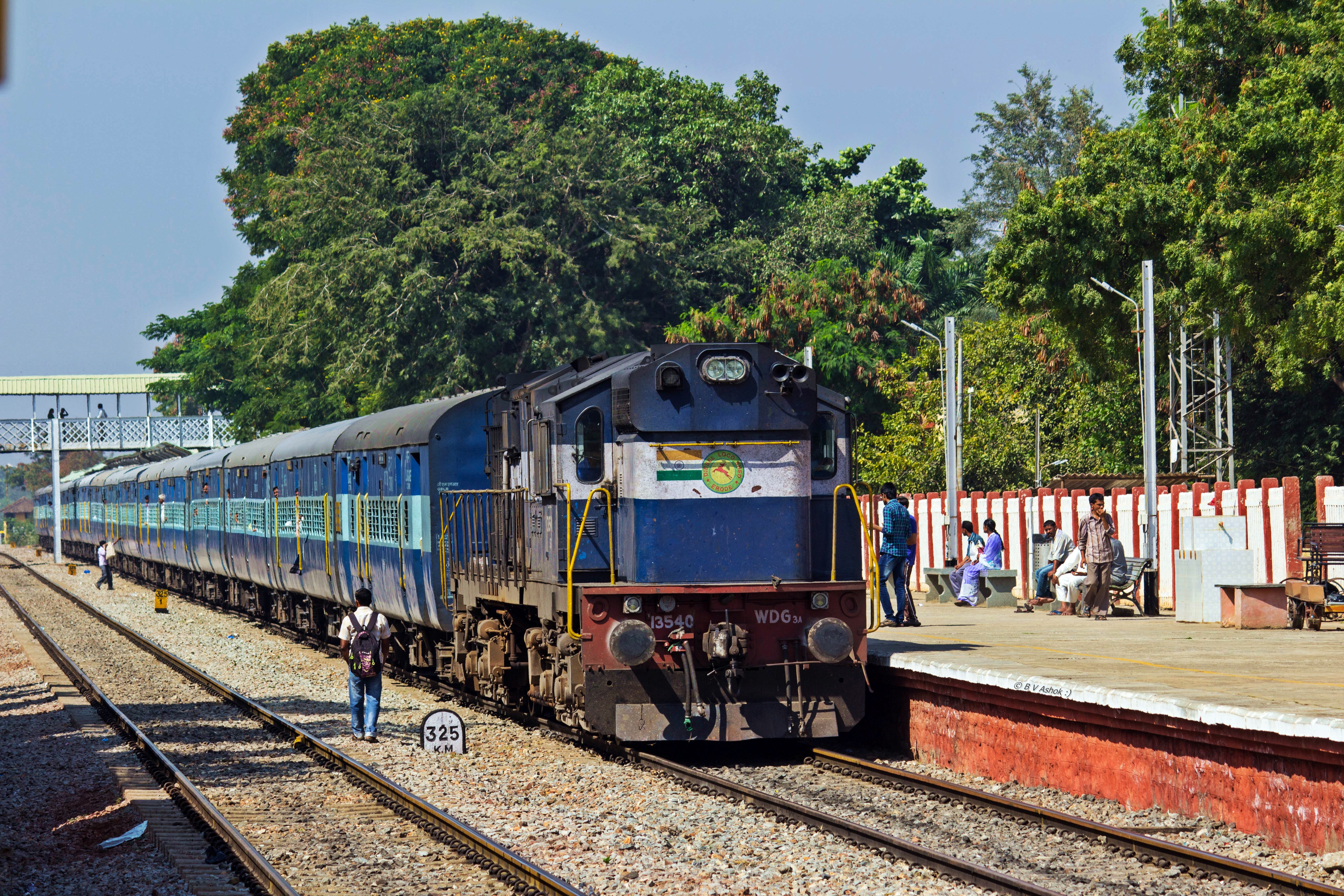
- Vishwamanava Express standing at Davanagere

Overview
- Service type: Express
- First service: 23 May 2017; 8 years ago
- Current operator: South Western Railway

Route
- Termini: Belagavi (BGM); Mysore (MYS)
- Stops: 35
- Distance travelled: 749 km (465 mi)
- Average journey time: 14h 55m
- Service frequency: Daily (Note: Runs one day in a week for every direction.)
- Train number: 17325 / 17326

On-board services
- Classes: General Unreserved, Second class chair car, AC chair car
- Seating arrangements: Yes
- Sleeping arrangements: No
- Catering facilities: On-board catering E-catering
- Baggage facilities: No
- Other facilities: Below the seats

Technical
- Rolling stock: ICF coach and LHB coach (from 25 Apr 2026)
- Track gauge: 1,676 mm (5 ft 6 in)
- Operating speed: 50 km/h (31 mph) average including halts
Route map
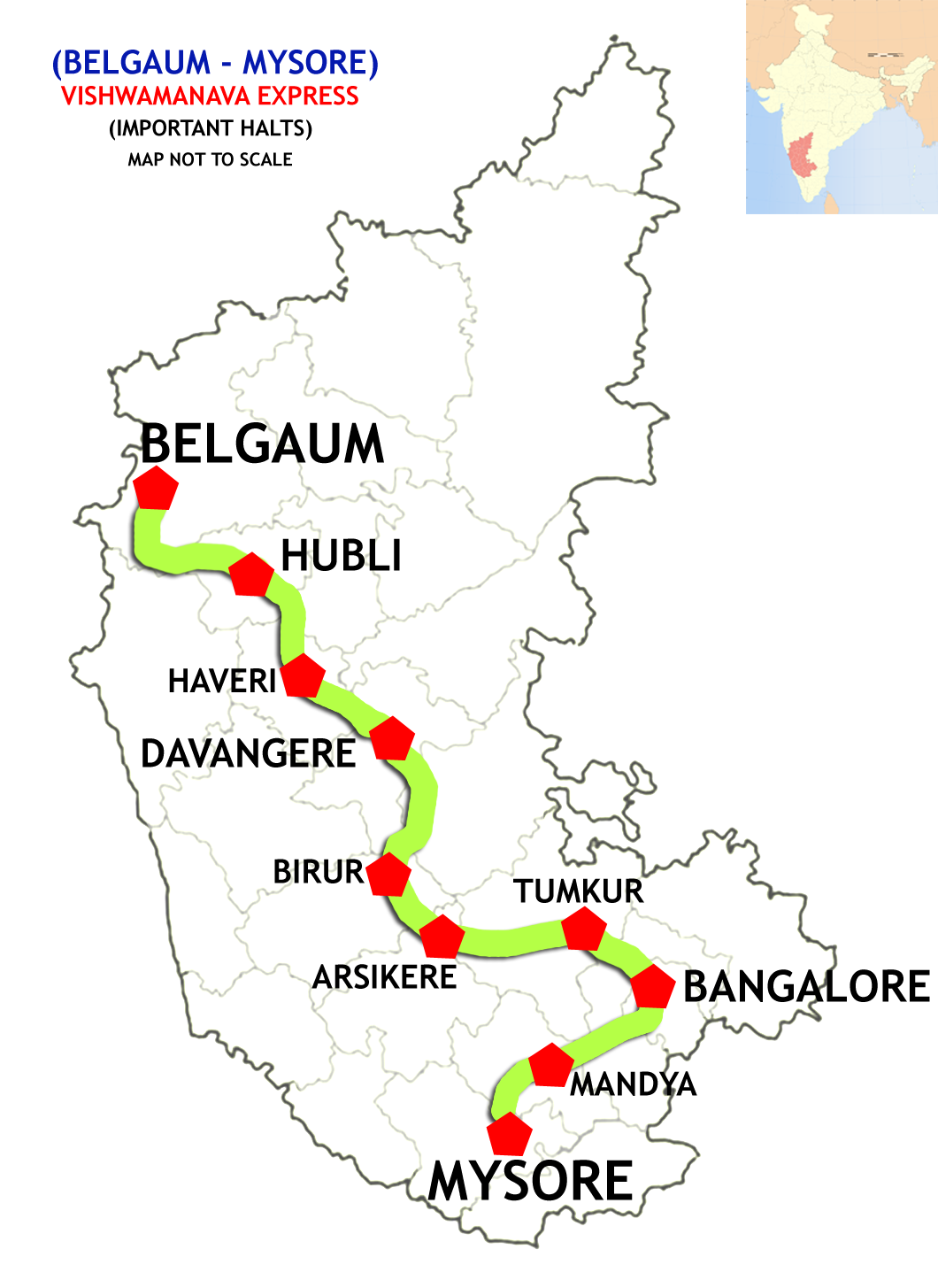

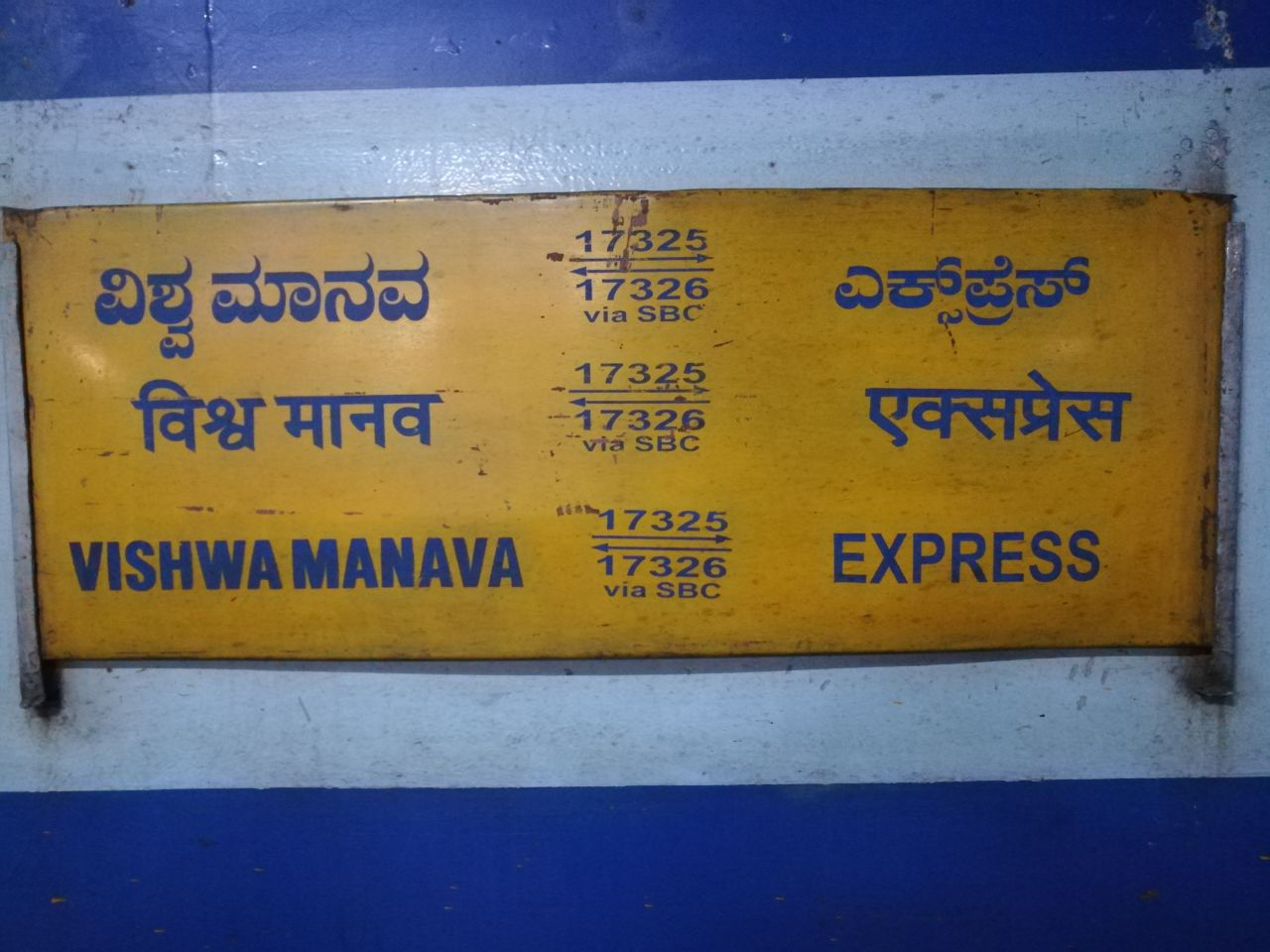
Vishwamanava Express Train Board

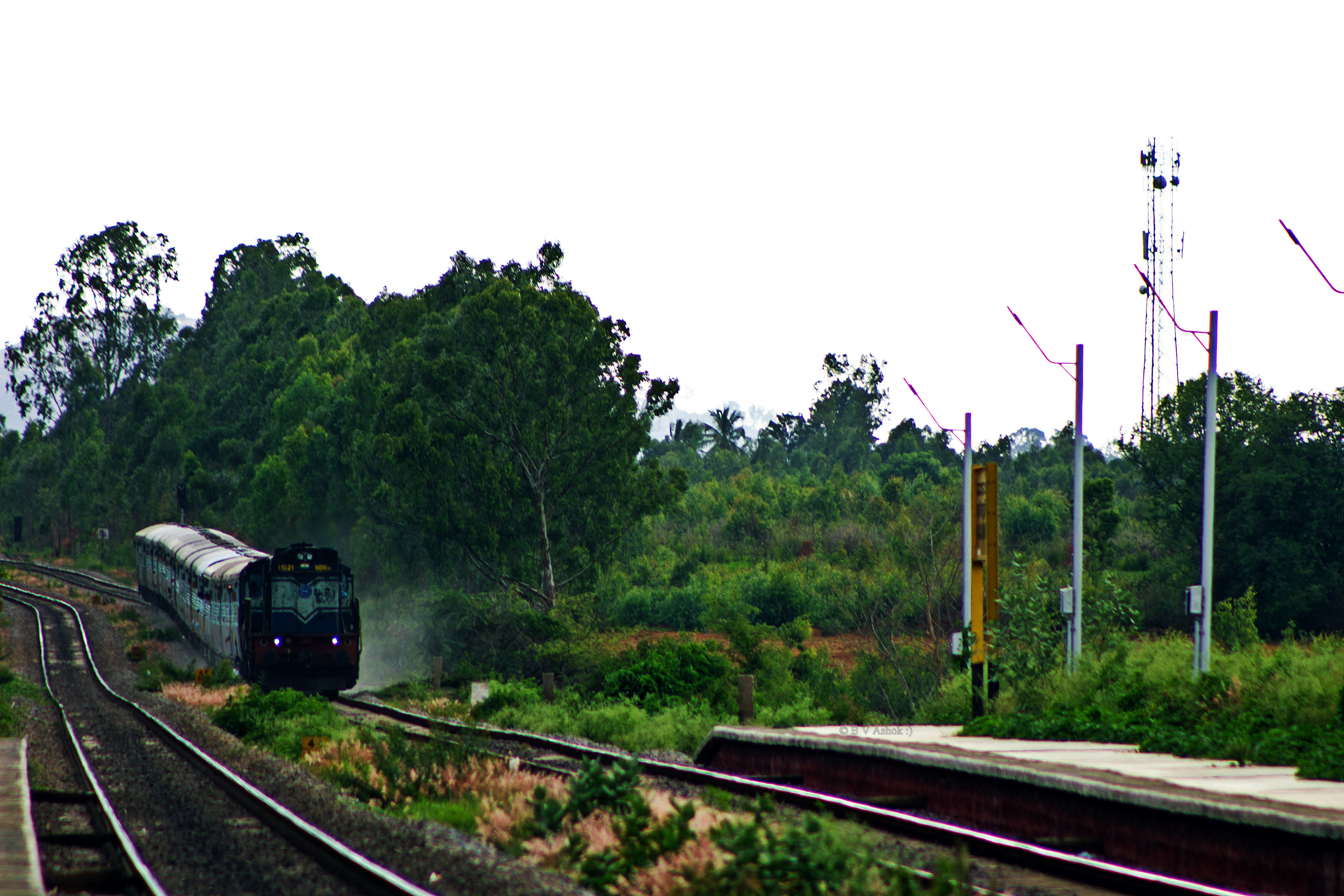
Vishwamanava Express near Muddalinganahalli

The 17325 / 17326 Vishwamanava Express is an Express train belonging to South Western Railway zone that runs between Belgaum and Mysore Junction in Karnataka India. It is currently being operated with 17325/17326 train numbers on a daily basis.

The train was named in honour of Kuvempu's idea of "Vishwa Manava" ("Universal Man").

== Service ==
The 17325/Vishwamanava Express has an average speed of 48 km/h and covers 750.7 km in 15h 40m. 17326/Vishwamanava Express has an average speed of 45 km/h and covers 750.7 km in 16h 40m.

== Route and halts ==
The important halts of the train are:

- Belgaum
- Khanapur
- Londa
- Tavargatti
- Alnavar
- Mugad
- Dharwad
- SSS Hubbali Junction
- Yalavagi
- Haveri
- Byadgi
- Ranibennur
- Harihar
- Davangere
- Chikjajur Junction
- Ramagiri
- Shivani
- Ajjampura
- Birur Junction
- Kadur Junction
- Arsikere Junction
- Tumakuru
- Yesvantpur Junction
- Bangalore City
- Kengeri
- Bidadi
- Ramanagara
- Mandya
- Pandavapura
- Shrirangapattana
- Mysore Junction

== Coach composition ==
earlier was ICF Blue rakes. The train has standard ICF Utkrisht rakes with a maximum speed of 110 km/h. The train consists of 18 coaches and even 18 standard LHB coaches:

- 11 General
- 4 chair car
- 1 AC chair car
- 2 Generators cum Luggage/parcel van

== Rake sharing ==
17315/16 Mysuru Junction–Talaguppa Intercity Express

== Traction ==
Earlier was WDP-4 and WDM-3A. now Both trains are hauled by a Krishnarajapuram Loco Shed based WAP-7 locomotive from Mysore to Belagavi and vice versa.

== See also ==
- Mysore Junction railway station
- Hubli Junction railway station
- Hubballi–Varanasi Weekly Express
- Mysore–Dharwad Express
- Ashokapuram railway station

== Notes ==
- 17325/Vishwamanava Express
- 17326/Vishwamanava Express
