= Mysuru–Dharwad Express =

Express train in India

Mysore–Dharwad Express
Overview
- Service type: Express
- First service: 1 September 2004; 21 years ago
- Current operator: South Western Railway zone

Route
- Termini: Mysore Junction (MYS); Dharwad (DWR)
- Stops: 15
- Distance travelled: 492 km (306 mi)
- Average journey time: 16h 20m
- Service frequency: Daily
- Train number: 17301/17302

On-board services
- Classes: AC II Tier, AC III Tier, Sleeper class, General Unreserved
- Seating arrangements: Yes
- Sleeping arrangements: Yes
- Catering facilities: Yes
- Observation facilities: ICF coach
- Entertainment facilities: No
- Baggage facilities: No
- Other facilities: Below the seats

Technical
- Rolling stock: 2
- Track gauge: 1,676 mm (5 ft 6 in)
- Electrification: In progress
- Operating speed: 50 km/h (31 mph)

The Mysuru–Dharwad Express is an Express train belonging to South Western Railway zone that runs between Dharwad railway station and Mysore Junction in India. It is currently being operated with 17301/17302 train numbers on daily basis.

== Route ==
The train travels through Mysore Junction, Krishnarajanagara, Hassan Junction, Arsikere Junction, Davangere, Harihar, Byadgi, Haveri, Yalvigi, Hubli Junction, Dharwad.

== Schedule ==
Train number	Station code	Departure station	Departure time	Arrival station	Arrival time	
17301	MYS	Mysore Junction	09:00 PM		Miraj	13:20 PM next day
17302	MRJ	Miraj	15:10 PM	Mysore Junction	7:05 AM next day	

== Traction ==
it was hauled by Krishnarajapuram-based WDP-4B or WDM-3D end to end

== See also ==
- Mysore Junction railway station
- Dharwad railway station
- Vishwamanava Express
