= Kashanatti railway station =

Railway station in Karnatak, India

Kashanatti

General information
- Location: Kumbarganvi Road, Hindasageri, Dharwad district, Karnatak; India
- Coordinates: 15°26′23″N 74°47′02″E
- Elevation: 587 metres (1,926 ft)
- System: Indian Railways station
- Owner: Indian Railways
- Operator: South Western Railway zone
- Line: Guntakal–Vasco da Gama line
- Platforms: 2
- Tracks: Double Electric-Line

Construction
- Structure type: Standard (on ground)

Other information
- Status: Functioning
- Station code: KHST
- Zone(s): South Western Railway zone
- Division(s): Hubballi

Services
Preceding station	Indian Railways	Following station
Kambarganvi towards ?	South Western Railway zone Guntakal–Vasco da Gama section	Alnavar Junction towards ?
Location
- Interactive map

Kashanatti railway station is a railway station located on the Guntakal–Vasco da Gama line operated by the South Western Railway zone under Hubballi railway division. It is situated beside Kumbarganvi Road at Hindasageri in Dharwad district in the Indian state of Karnatak.
