= Tavargatti railway station =

Railway station in Karnataka

Tavargatti

General information
- Location: State Highway 34, Tavargatti, Belgaum district, Karnatak; India
- Coordinates: 15°24′53″N 74°39′46″E
- Elevation: 637 metres (2,090 ft)
- System: Indian Railways station
- Owner: Indian Railways
- Operator: South Western Railway zone
- Line: Guntakal–Vasco da Gama line
- Platforms: 1
- Tracks: Double Electric-Line

Construction
- Structure type: Standard (on ground)

Other information
- Status: Functioning
- Station code: TVG
- Zone(s): South Western Railway zone
- Division(s): Hubballi

Services
Preceding station	Indian Railways	Following station
Alnavar Junction towards ?	South Western Railway zone Guntakal–Vasco da Gama section	Nagargali towards ?
Location
- Interactive map

Tavargatti railway station is a railway station located on the Guntakal–Vasco da Gama line operated by the South Western Railway zone under Hubballi railway division. It is situated beside State Highway 34 at Tavargatti in Belgaum district in the Indian state of Karnatak.
