= KSR Bengaluru–Dharwad Vande Bharat Express =

Mini Vande Bharat Express train route in India

KSR Bengaluru - Dharwad Vande Bharat Express
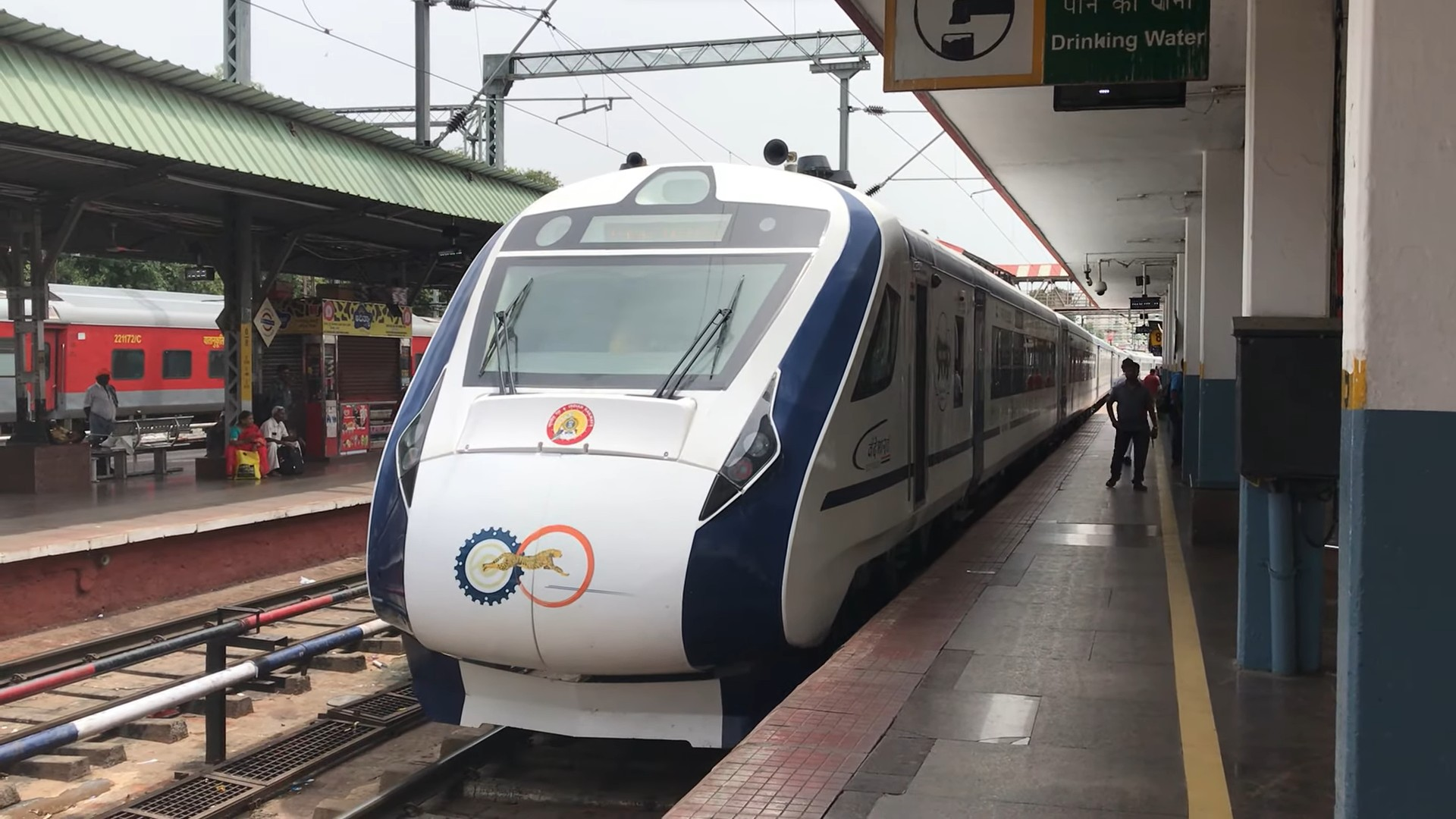
- This Mini VB Express train on standby at KSR Bengaluru City Jn

Overview
- Service type: Vande Bharat Express
- Locale: Karnataka
- First service: 27 June 2023 (Inaugural run); 28 June 2023; 3 years ago (Commercial run)
- Current operator: South Western Railways (SWR)

Route
- Termini: KSR Bengaluru City Jn (SBC); Dharwad (DWR)
- Stops: 5
- Distance travelled: 490 km (304 mi)
- Average journey time: 06 hrs 25 mins
- Service frequency: Six days a week (Note: Except Tuesdays)
- Train number: 20661 / 20662
- Line used: Bengaluru - Hubli line

On-board services
- Classes: AC Chair Car, AC Executive Chair Car
- Seating arrangements: Airline style; Rotatable seats
- Sleeping arrangements: No
- Catering facilities: On-board catering(veg, non_veg)
- Observation facilities: Large windows in all coaches
- Entertainment facilities: On-board WiFi; Infotainment System; Electric outlets; Reading light; Seat Pockets; Bottle Holder; Tray Table
- Baggage facilities: Overhead racks
- Other facilities: Kavach

Technical
- Rolling stock: Mini Vande Bharat 2.0
- Track gauge: Indian gauge 1,676 mm (5 ft 6 in) broad gauge
- Electrification: 25 kV 50 Hz AC Overhead line
- Operating speed: 89.5 km/h (56 mph) (Avg, between KSR Bengaluru and Hubli Jn.)
- Average length: 192 metres (630 ft) (08 coaches)
- Track owner: Indian Railways
- Rake maintenance: KSR Bengaluru City Jn (SBC)

The 20661/20662 KSR Bengaluru - Dharwad Vande Bharat Express is India's 21st Vande Bharat Express train, connecting the city of Bengaluru with Dharwad city in Karnataka. This train was flagged off by Prime Minister Narendra Modi on 27 June 2023 via video conference from Rani Kamalapati railway station.

== Overview ==
This train is operated by Indian Railways, connecting KSR Bengaluru City Jn, Yesvantpur Jn, Tumkur, Davangere, SMM Haveri, SSS Hubballi Junction and Dharwad. It is currently operated with train numbers 20661/20662 on 6 days a week basis.

=== Trial Run Extension to Belagavi ===
On 21 November 2023, the trial run was performed by starting from KSR Bengaluru around 05:45am and terminating at Belagavi at 01:30pm. It left from Belagavi at 02:00pm and reached Bengaluru at 10:10pm, despite being a successful run, local politicians of Hubballi Dharwad curtailed the extnesion with wague reason of track issues, besides when Pune Belagavi Vande Bharat train was extended to SSS Hubballi using same track the SWR were mum but public ire and RTI facts later forced the MP to review and put pressure on MOSR resulted in getting a new VB for Belagavi later.

== Rakes ==
It is the nineteenth 2nd Generation and the seventh Mini Vande Bharat 2.0 Express train which was designed and manufactured by the Integral Coach Factory at Perambur, Chennai under the Make in India Initiative.

== Service ==
The 20661/20662 KSR Bengaluru City Jn - Dharwad Vande Bharat Express operates six days a week except Tuesdays, covering a distance of 490 km (300 mi) in a travel time of 6 hours with an average speed of 76 km/h (47 mph). The service has 5 intermediate stops. The Maximum Permissible Speed is 130 km/h (81 mph).

== See also ==
- Vande Bharat Express
- Gatimaan Express
- Tejas Express
- KSR Bengaluru–Hubli Jan Shatabdi Express
- Bangalore City railway station
- Dharwad railway station
