= Penukonda train collision =

2012 railway incident in India

Coordinates: 14.1002°N 77.5930°E

Details
- Date: 22 May 2012; 03:00 IST (UTC+05:30)
- Location: Penukonda, Andhra Pradesh
- Country: India
- Line: Gooty – Yelahanka
- Operator: South Western Railway
- Incident type: Rear-End Collision
- Cause: Pilot error

Statistics
- Trains: 2 (a Hampi Express and a goods train)
- Vehicles: WDP-4D locomotive
- Deaths: 25
- Injured: 100+
- Damage: 3 coaches derailed and 1 coach catch fire

The Penukonda train collision occurred in the early hours of 22 May 2012, when the Bangalore bound Hampi Express crashed into a stationary freight train near Penukonda, in the Indian state of Andhra Pradesh. The incident killed 25 people while 43 people were injured. Three coaches derailed as a result of the crash while another caught fire. The fire was brought under control and rescue and relief operations started in a couple of hours. Railway Minister Mukul Roy, who was in Kolkata, rushed to the site of the accident and ordered an inquiry into it. Early reports suggested that Hampi Express overshot a signal and collided with a stationary goods train. Roy also announced a compensation of Rs 500,000 to the next of kin of the deceased, Rs 100,000 for those who sustained grievous injuries and Rs 50,000 to those who received minor injuries.

== Overview ==
=== Crash ===
According to Railway sources, the over-speeding Hampi Express with Hubli-based WDP-4D collided with stationary goods train at around 3:00 a.m when allegedly train driver overlooked the signal that kicked three coaches comprising two general bogies and one sleeper off the tracks. Primarily 15 dead bodies have been recovered and over 70 injured passengers were rushed to nearby hospitals in Anantpur district while seriously injured were referred to Bangalore. Prima-facie, it looks like that the driver overlooked the signal or there was some error in signal that cause this mishap, said a Railway official by adding that whatever, the matter was, Railway ministry has ordered a probe and the reason would come there after. The next morning, reports suggested that 21 people were killed in the accident. Of them, 11 were charred to death in the first coach, which caught fire, while the rest were trapped to death in the third coach. The first three coaches of the train derailed due to the impact of the collision. Finally that evening, the death toll was put at 25 while Andhra Pradesh police were still carrying out the rescue operations. "I heard a deafening sound around 3:15 in the morning. I jumped out of the train fearing for my life and saw people crammed into the compartment toilet," recalled Rahman, one of the passengers who survived the crash. "The carriage was a mangled wreck and fire engulfed it. Many women and children suffered scalding burns. It is one of the most horrific scenes I have ever seen in my life," he added. Lakshman T Basapur, a new recruit of the railway department, was travelling in S-7 bogie along with his brother Venkappa to report for work on the first, said: "I was sleeping on the upper berth and there was a huge jerk. I fell on the floor of the train and realised it had met with an accident killing passengers travelling in the general compartment bogie just behind the locomotive. I was lucky enough as I suffered only minor injuries caused by the fall." CNN IBN, in its final report on the crash, stated that as many as 25 passengers, who were in deep sleep, died and over 100 others were injured. Most of the victims were from Karnataka. Among the deceased, 17 were in the women's compartment which took the maximum impact and the remaining were in a sleeper coach and a general bogie next to it. While 24 passengers died on the spot, another person, identified as Maganappa, died while undergoing treatment at a hospital in Pavagada in Karnataka. The bodies in the general bogie were charred, making identification difficult.

=== Probing ===
Safety engineers, who were part of the rescue special that steamed in from Bangalore to Penukonda in the wake of the accident, said the loss of lives could have been avoided if only the loco pilot had been alert. Under such circumstances, the loco pilot should not have overlooked the danger signal that denied him entry to the station until the goods train moved out of Penukonda railway station, said experts after a preliminary examination of the accident spot. Nevertheless, M.Y. Ratnam, a loco pilot with the South Central Railway's Guntakal zone, and co-pilot Balaraju escaped, probably because they jumped out of the train immediately after applying the emergency brake. Had they not applied the brake, the impact of the collision would have spread to more coaches increasing the toll, the safety engineers said. Speaking to The Hindu, the guard of the Hampi Express, Bhagwan, said he had no clue that the train had actually jumped a danger signal that denied entry into Penukonda station. He said that he was among the first to run into the station for help and denied rumours that himself or the pilots tried to escape. Meanwhile, experts in the signalling system for the railways at Guntakal said an enquiry into the incident would bring out the truth. They denied any possibility of the driver having been under the influence of alcohol, as all pilots were subjected to a breathalyser test and that unless they passed it, they would not be allowed for duty.

== Recovery ==
A day after the crash, The public relations officer (PRO) of Indian Railways, Anil Saxena, said that rescue operations at the train collision site at Penukonda in Andhra Pradesh is almost over with most passengers being sent to their respective destinations safely. "Relief and rescue operation is almost over, most of the coaches have been tackled but the last coach which was being tackled was the SLR coach next to the engine, that has also been tackled and now the technician team and the officials and the staff there, some of them have entered the coach to ascertain any possible survivors. All the injured have been admitted in the Penukonda hospital and Puttaparthi hospital," said Saxena. When asked about the disruption of traffic on the route, he explained that the traffic was not disrupted on the section as one line was made functional immediately after the crash the previous morning and only some trains had to be delayed while one train was cancelled. As far as the stranded passengers were concerned of the ill-fated train, they all were taken to their respective destinations. Some of them were transported through 10 buses that were arranged by the railways, some of them were taken through Bangalore Rajdhani Express and Udyan Express which was passing through that route.
