= Mysuru Junction–Talaguppa Intercity Express =

Train in India

Talaguppa-Mysore Intercity Express
Overview
- Service type: Express
- First service: 26 January 2011; 15 years ago
- Current operator: South Western Railway

Route
- Termini: Talaguppa; Mysuru Junction
- Stops: 11
- Distance travelled: 374 km (232 mi)
- Average journey time: 07 hrs 57 mins
- Service frequency: Daily
- Train number: 16205 / 16206

On-board services
- Classes: General Unreserved, AC Chair Car, Second Class Seating
- Seating arrangements: Yes
- Sleeping arrangements: No
- Auto-rack arrangements: Overhead racks
- Catering facilities: On-board catering, E-catering
- Baggage facilities: No

Technical
- Rolling stock: ICF coach
- Track gauge: Broad Gauge
- Operating speed: 49 km/h (30 mph) average including halts.

The 16205 / 16206 Talaguppa - Mysuru Intercity Express is an Express train belonging to Indian Railways South Western Railway zone that runs between Talaguppa and Mysore Junction in India.

It operates as train number 16205 from Talaguppa to Mysore Junction and as train number 16206 in the reverse direction serving the states of Karnataka.

== Coaches ==
The 16205 / 06 Talaguppa - Mysore Junction Intercity Express has one AC chair car, five Chair car, 14 general unreserved & two SLR (seating with luggage rake) coaches . It does not carry a pantry car coach.

As is customary with most train services in India, coach composition may be amended at the discretion of Indian Railways depending on demand.

== Service ==
The 16205 Talaguppa - Mysore Junction Intercity Express covers the distance of 374 km (232 mi) in 7 hours 45 mins (48 km/h) and in 7 hours 30 mins as the 16206 Mysore Junction - Talaguppa Intercity Express (50 km/h).

== Rake sharing ==
17315/16 Vishwamanava Express

As the average speed of the train is lower than 55 km/h (34 mph), as per railway rules, its fare doesn't includes a Superfast surcharge.

== Routing ==
The 16205 / 06 Talaguppa - Mysuru Junction Intercity Express runs from Talaguppa via Shivamogga Town ,Arsikere Junction to Mysuru Junction.

== Traction ==
As the route is fully electrified, a Krishnarajapuram based WAP-7 electric locomotive or WDP-4D diesel locomotive pulls the train to its destination.
