= KSR Bengaluru–Hubli Jan Shatabdi Express =

Jan Shatabdi Express train in India

KSR Bengaluru City - SSS Hubballi Junction Jan Shatabdi Express

Overview
- Service type: Superfast Express, Jan Shatabdi Express
- First service: 24 November 2002; 23 years ago
- Current operator: South Western Railways (SWR)

Route
- Termini: KSR Bengaluru (SBC); SSS Hubballi (UBL)
- Stops: 9
- Distance travelled: 470 km (290 mi)
- Average journey time: 7 hours 10 minutes in both directions
- Service frequency: Daily
- Train number: 12079/12080

On-board services
- Classes: AC Chair Car, 2nd Class seating
- Seating arrangements: Yes
- Sleeping arrangements: No
- Auto-rack arrangements: No
- Catering facilities: No
- Baggage facilities: Overhead racks

Technical
- Rolling stock: LHB coach
- Track gauge: 1,676 mm (5 ft 6 in)
- Electrification: Yes
- Operating speed: 130 km/h (81 mph) maximum 66 km/h (41 mph) average, including halts
Route map
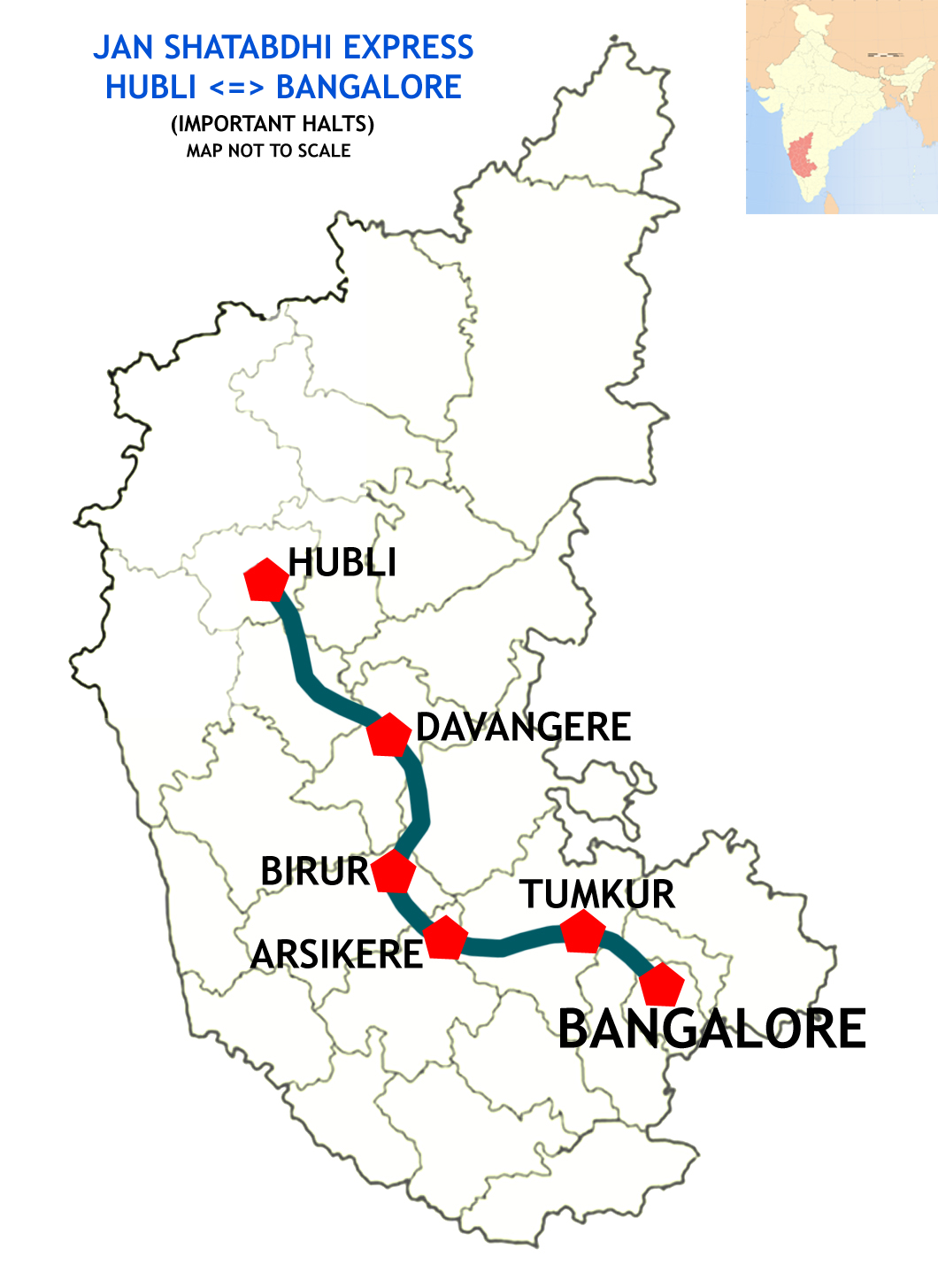
↓ 12080 • 12079 ↑

The 12079/80 KSR Bengaluru - SSS Hubballi Jan Shatabdi Express is a Daily Superfast Express train of the Jan Shatabdi Express series belonging to Indian Railways - South Western Railway zone that runs between KSR Bengaluru and Hubballi Junction in India. It is the fastest train after the KSR Bengaluru-Dharwad Vande Bharat Express between Bengaluru and Hubballi.

The tracks between Hubballi and Bengaluru are fully doubled, along with some straightening of the shorter radius curves. This has resulted in this train running faster by about 30 minutes, with a total journey time of 7 hours compared to 7 hours and 30 minutes earlier.

The SBC DWR Vande Bharat Express between Dharwad and Bengaluru and Belagavi and KSR Bengaluru Vande Bharat Express is faster than this train.

It operates as train number 12079 from KSR Bengaluru to Hubballi Junction and as train number 12080 in the reverse direction serving the state of Karnataka.

It is part of the Jan Shatabdi Express series launched by the former railway minister of India, Mr. Nitish Kumar in the 2002–03 Rail Budget.

== Coaches ==
The 12079/80 KSR Bengaluru - Hubballi Junction Jan Shatabdi Express has two AC Chair Car, 12 2nd Class seating and two EOG. It does not carry a Pantry car coach.

As is customary with most train services in India, Coach Composition may be amended at the discretion of Indian Railways depending on demand.

== Service ==
The 12079/80 KSR Bengaluru - Hubballi Junction Jan Shatabdi Expres covers the distance of 470 km (290 mi) in 7 hours 00 mins at 67 km/h (42 mph) in both directions.

As the average speed of the train is above 55 km/h (35 mph), as per Indian Railways rules, its fare includes a Superfast surcharge.

== Routing ==
The 12079/80 KSR Bengaluru Hubballi Jan Shatabdi Express runs from KSR Bengaluru via Yesvantpur Junction, Tumakuru, Arsikere Junction, Birur Junction, Chikjajur Junction, Davangere, Harihar, Ranibennur, and Haveri to Hubballi Junction.

== Traction ==
As the entire route is electrified, A Hubballi-based WAP 7 locomotive powers the train for its entire journey.

== Operation ==
12079 KSR Bengaluru Hubballi Junction Jan Shatabdi Express runs from KSR Bengaluru on a daily basis arriving Hubballi Junction the same day .

12080 Hubli Bangalore City Jan Shatabdi Express runs from Hubli Junction on a daily basis arriving Bangalore City Junction the same day .
