= Kyarkop railway station =

Railway station in Karnataka

Kyarkop

General information
- Location: State Highway 34, Kyarkoppa, Dharwad district, Karnatak; India
- Coordinates: 15°26′32″N 75°58′05″E
- Elevation: 719 metres (2,359 ft)
- System: Indian Railways station
- Owner: Indian Railways
- Operator: South Western Railway zone
- Line: Guntakal–Vasco da Gama line
- Platforms: 2
- Tracks: Double Electric-Line

Construction
- Structure type: Standard (on ground)

Other information
- Status: Functioning
- Station code: KRKP
- Zone(s): South Western Railway zone
- Division(s): Hubballi

Services
Preceding station	Indian Railways	Following station
Dharwad towards ?	South Western Railway zone Guntakal–Vasco da Gama section	Mugad towards ?
Location
- Interactive map

Kyarkop railway station is a railway station located on the Guntakal–Vasco da Gama line operated by the South Western Railway zone under Hubballi railway division. It is situated beside State Highway 34 at Kyarkoppa in Dharwad district in the Indian state of Karnatak.
