= Yesvantpur–Harihar Intercity Express =

Yesvantpur Junction–Bidar Intercity Express
Overview
- Service type: Intercity Express
- First service: 7 November 2014; 11 years ago
- Current operator: South Western Railway zone

Route
- Termini: Yesvantpur Junction; Bidar
- Stops: 9
- Distance travelled: 668 km (415 mi)
- Average journey time: 7 hours 05 mins
- Service frequency: Tri-weekly
- Train number: 16577 / 16578

On-board services
- Classes: General unreserved, AC chair car, Chair car
- Seating arrangements: Yes
- Sleeping arrangements: Yes
- Catering facilities: No

Technical
- Rolling stock: LHB coach
- Operating speed: 49.5 km/h (31 mph)
Route map
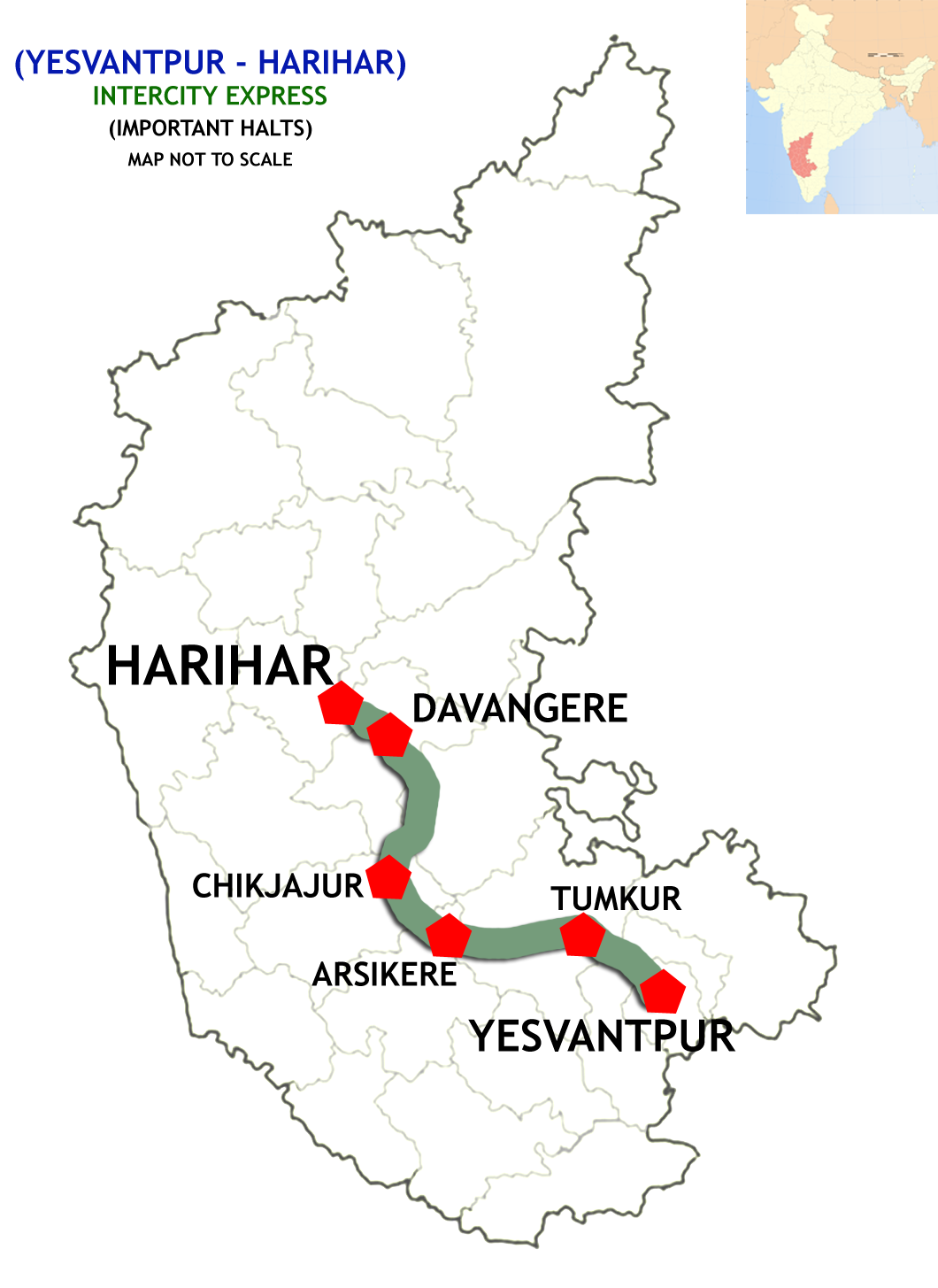

The 16577 / 78 Yesvantpur Junction–Bidar Intercity Express is an Intercity Express train belonging to Indian Railways South Western Railway zone that runs between Yesvantpur Junction and Bidar in India.

It operates as train number 16577 from Yesvantpur Junction to Bidar and as train number 16578 in the reverse direction, serving the states of Karnataka.

== Coaches ==
The 16577 / 78 Yesvantpur Junction–Bidar Intercity Express gets an LHB Blue coach it has one AC chair car, six Chair cars, six general unreserved & two SLR (seating with luggage rake) coaches. It does not carry a pantry car.

As is customary with most train services in India, coach composition may be amended at the discretion of Indian Railways depending on demand.

== Service ==
The 16577 Yesvantpur Junction–Harihar Intercity Express covers the distance of 333.1 km (207 mi) in 7 hours 15 mins (46 km/h) and in 6 hours 15 mins as the 16578 Harihar–Yesvantpur Junction Intercity Express (53 km/h).

As the average speed of the train is lower than 55 km/h (34 mph), as per railway rules, its fare doesn't includes a Superfast surcharge.

== Routing ==
The 16577 / 78 Yesvantpur Junction–Harihar Intercity Express runs from Yesvantpur Junction via Arsikere Junction, Kadur Junction railway station to Bidar.

== Traction ==
earlier was WDM-3A and WDP-4D. As the route is electrified, a Krishnarajapuram-based WAP-7 electric locomotive pulls the train to its destination.
