= Mugad =

- Village
- Location in Karnataka, India Mugad (India)
- Coordinates: 15°27′N 74°55′E
- Country: India
- State: Karnataka
- District: Dharwad

Population (2011)
  - Total: 5,085

Languages
  - Official: Kannada
- Time zone: UTC+5:30 (IST)

Mugad is a village in Dharwad district of Karnataka, India.

== Demographics ==
As of the 2011 Census of India there were 1,027 households in Mugad and a total population of 5,085 consisting of 2,630 males and 2,455 females. There were 649 children ages 0-6.

== Transportation ==
Mugad railway station, located on Guntakal–Vasco da Gama line, is the nearest rail connection of the area.
