= SSS Hubballi–MGR Chennai Central Superfast Express =

Train in India

Overview
- Service type: Superfast
- First service: 24 May 2003; 22 years ago
- Current operator: South Western Railway

Route
- Termini: Hubballi Junction (UBL); Chennai Central (MAS)
- Stops: 16
- Distance travelled: 830 km (516 mi)
- Average journey time: 15h 15m
- Service frequency: Weekly (Note: Runs one day in a week for every direction.)
- Train number: 22697 / 22698

On-board services
- Classes: AC first, AC 2 tier, AC 3 tier, Sleeper class, General Unreserved
- Seating arrangements: Yes
- Sleeping arrangements: Yes
- Catering facilities: On-board catering, E-catering
- Observation facilities: Large windows
- Entertainment facilities: No
- Baggage facilities: No
- Other facilities: Below the seats

Technical
- Rolling stock: LHB coach
- Track gauge: 1,676 mm (5 ft 6 in)
- Operating speed: 54 km/h (34 mph) average including halts.

The 22697 / 22698 SSS Hubballi–MGR Chennai Central Superfast Express is a Superfast train belonging to South Western Railway zone that runs between Hubballi Junction and Chennai Central in India. It is currently being operated with 22697/22698 train numbers on a weekly basis.

== Service ==
The 22697/Hubballi–Chennai Central Superfast Express has an average speed of 54 km/h and covers 831 km in 15h 30m. The 22698/Chennai Central–Hubballi Superfast Express has an average speed of 54 km/h and covers 831 km in 15h 20m.

== Route and halts ==
The important halts of the train are:

- Hubballi Junction
- Davangere
- Arsikere Junction
- Tumakuru
- Yesvantpur Junction
- Banaswadi
- Krishnarajapuram
- Bangarapet Junction
- Jolarpettai Junction
- Katpadi Junction
- Arakkonam Junction
- Perambur
- Chennai Central

== Coach composition ==
The train has standard ICF rakes with a maximum speed of 110 km/h. The train consists of 16 coaches:

- 1 AC II Tier
- 2 AC III Tier
- 7 Sleeper coaches
- 4 General Unreserved
- 2 Seating cum Luggage Rake

== Traction ==
Both trains are hauled by a Hubballi Loco Shed based WAP-7 from Hubballi Junction to Chennai Central and vice versa

== Direction reversal ==
The train reverses its direction once:

- Yesvantpur Junction

== See also ==
- Chennai Central railway station
- Hubli Junction railway station
