= Harihar railway station =

Railway Station in Karnataka, India

Harihar Railway Station

General information
- Location: Behind KSRTC Bus Stand, Harihar, Davangere district, Karnataka, 577601; India
- Coordinates: 14.5153°N 75.8111°E
- Elevation: 551 metres (1,808 ft)
- Owner: Indian Railways
- Operator: South Western Railways
- Platforms: 3
- Tracks: 5

Construction
- Structure type: standard (on ground station)
- Parking: Yes

Other information
- Status: Functioning
- Station code: HRR
- Zone(s): South Western Railway zone
- Division(s): Mysore

History
- Opened: 1889
Location
- Location within Karnataka
- Interactive map

Harihar railway station is a main railway station in Davanagere district, Karnataka. Its code is HRR. It serves Harihar town. The station consists of three platforms. The platforms are not well sheltered.

Harihar is well connected with most of the major cities like New Delhi, Mumbai, Bengaluru, Pune, Hubli, Bellary and Chennai through regular trains.

== Trains ==
- Yesvantpur–Harihar Intercity Express
- Bellari-Harihar DEMU
- Harihar–Hosapete Express
