= Hampi Express =

Indian express train

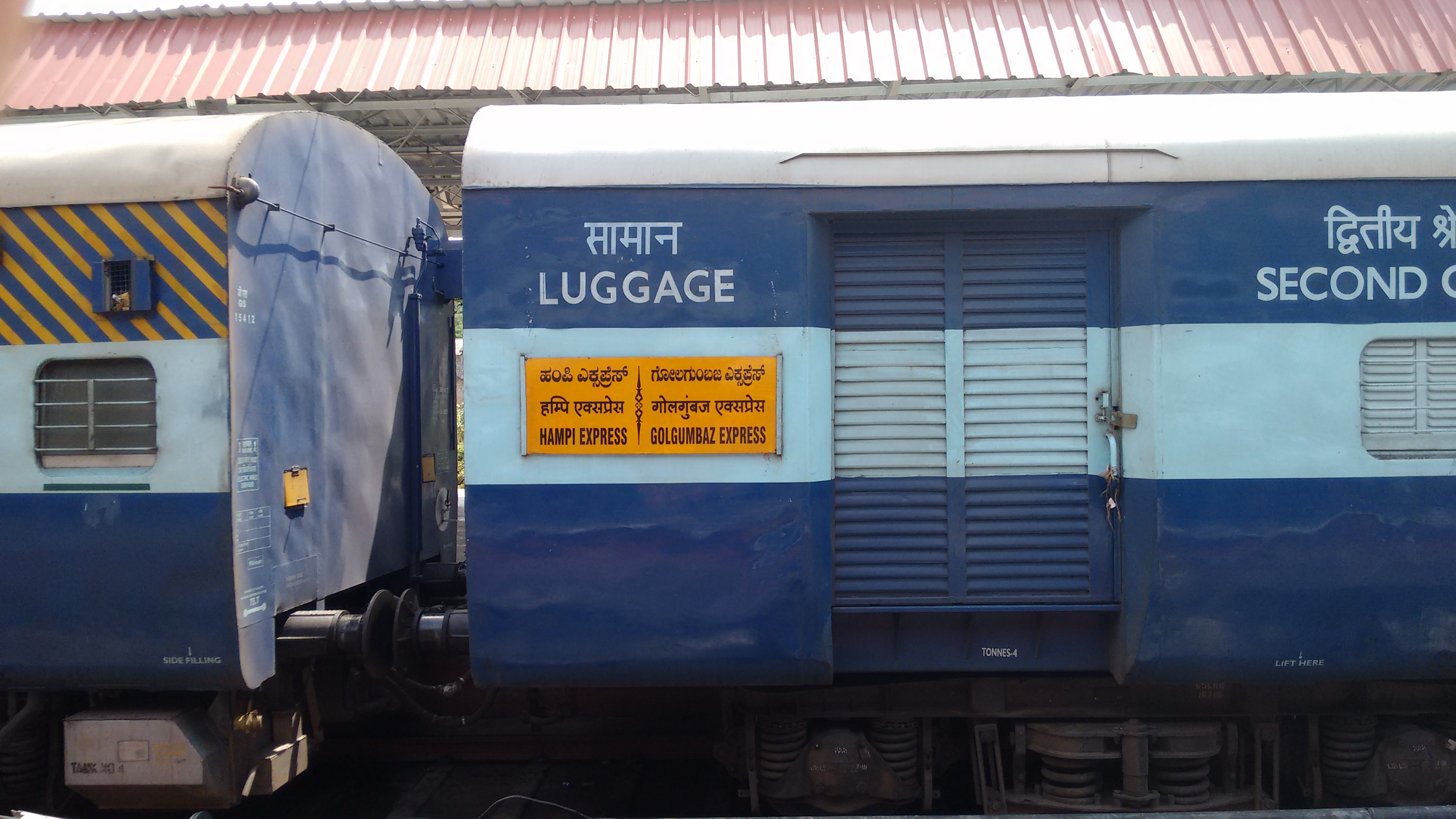
- Hampi express trainboard

Overview
- Service type: Express
- First service: 1 November 1980; 45 years ago
- Current operator: South Western Railways

Route
- Termini: Mysore (MYS); Hubli (UBL)
- Stops: 32
- Distance travelled: 678 km (421 mi)
- Average journey time: 14h 50m
- Service frequency: Daily
- Train number: 16591 / 16592

On-board services
- Classes: AC II Tier, AC III Tier, Sleeper Class, General Unreserved
- Seating arrangements: Yes
- Sleeping arrangements: Yes
- Catering facilities: On-board catering E-catering
- Observation facilities: Rake sharing with 16535/16536 Gol Gumbaz Express

Technical
- Rolling stock: LHB coach
- Track gauge: 1,676 mm (5 ft 6 in)
- Operating speed: 45 km/h (28 mph) average including halts
Route map
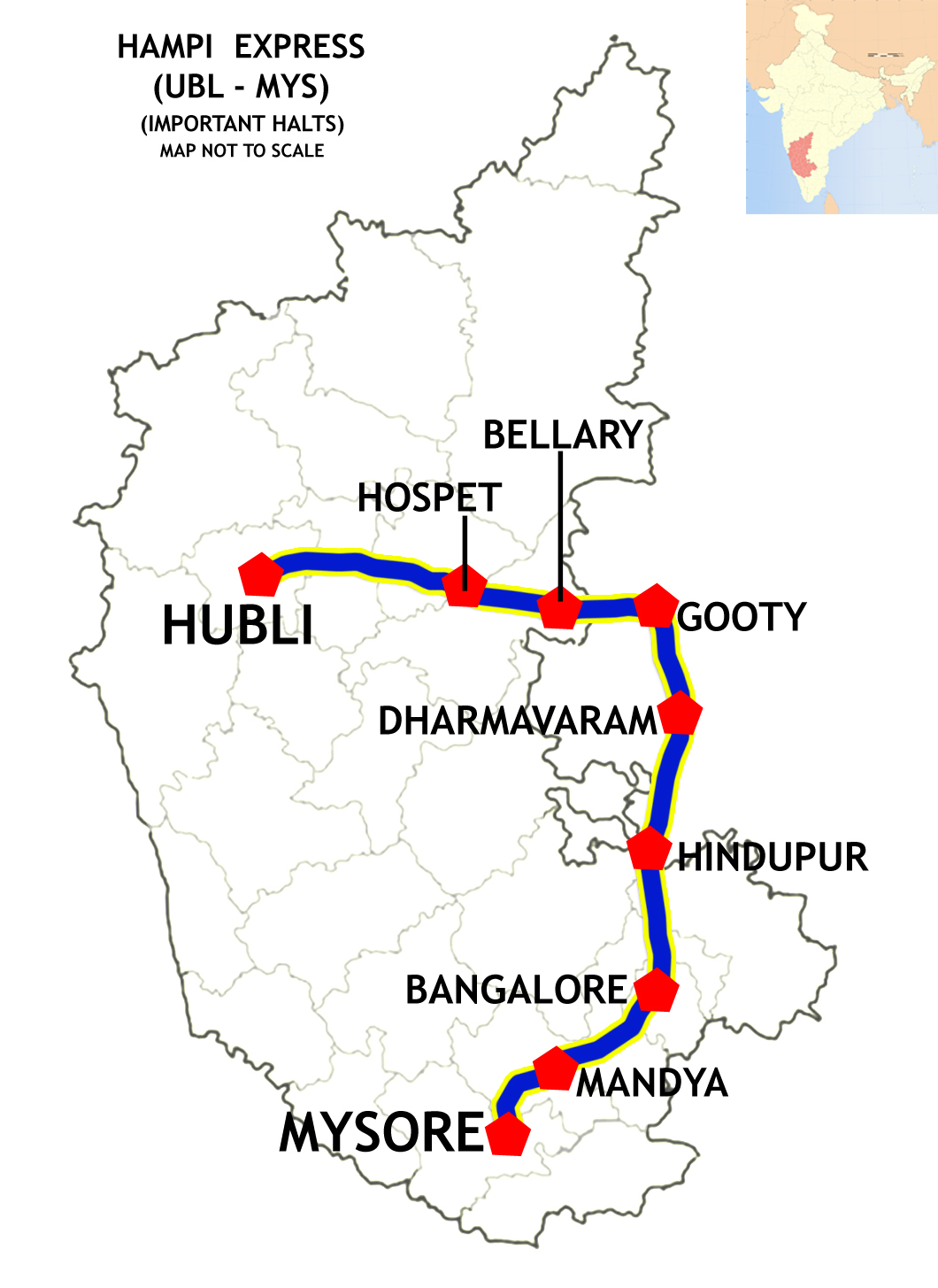

The 16591 / 16592 Hampi Express is a daily Express running between the Mysuru and Hubballi Junction, the headquarters of the South Western Railway in India. It is a train of the South Western Railway having primary maintenance at Hubballi.

== History ==
This train was introduced earlier between Bengaluru and Hosapete after the gauge conversion between Bengaluru and Dharmavaram was completed. Later, it was extended to run till Hubballi. In 1996, a slip/link was attached to this train as the Nanded Link Express which became a separate train in 2010. In July 2013, this train was extended to Mysore to provide direct connectivity between Mysore and Ballari among other places

The train is named after Hampi, an historical town belonging to the Vijayanagara Empire. The town is a tourist attraction for the ruins of the empire. This train passes through Hosapete that has the nearest station to this town.

== Locomotive ==
earlier was ICF rakes it runs with WDP-4D. The train is hauled by a Krishnarajapuram WAP-7 electric locomotive from end to end.

== Coach composition ==
earlier this train runs with ICF coaches now they get an LHB coaches upgrade. This train has one AC First Class-Two Tier combo, one Two Tier AC and one Three Tier AC coach, 9 sleeping coaches, 6 unreserved coaches and 2 second seating cum luggage rake. The train shares its rakes with 16535/36 Gol Gumbaz Express. Also the train has recently been augmented with one First Class Air Conditioned coach by duly replacing one First Class cum AC Two Tier coach.

== Route & halts ==
This train runs from Mysore via Kengeri, Bangalore City, Yesvantpur Junction, Yelahanka Junction, Hindupur, Dharmavaram, Anantapur, Guntakal Junction, Ballari Junction, Hosapete Junction, Gadag Junction to Hubli.

== Schedule ==
- 16591 leaves Hubli every day at 6:20 PM to reach Mysore at 9:20 AM the next morning, covering 704 km in 15 hours at an average speed of 45 km/h
- 16592 leaves Mysore at 7:00 PM to reach Hubli at 10:40 AM, taking 16 hours at an average speed of 44 kmph

== Rake sharing ==
The train sharing its rake with 16535/16536 Gol Gumbaz Express.

== Incidents and accidents ==
On 22 May 2012, the 16591 Hampi Express collided with a stationary goods train at Penukonda station killing 25 people and injuring 74.

== Gallery ==
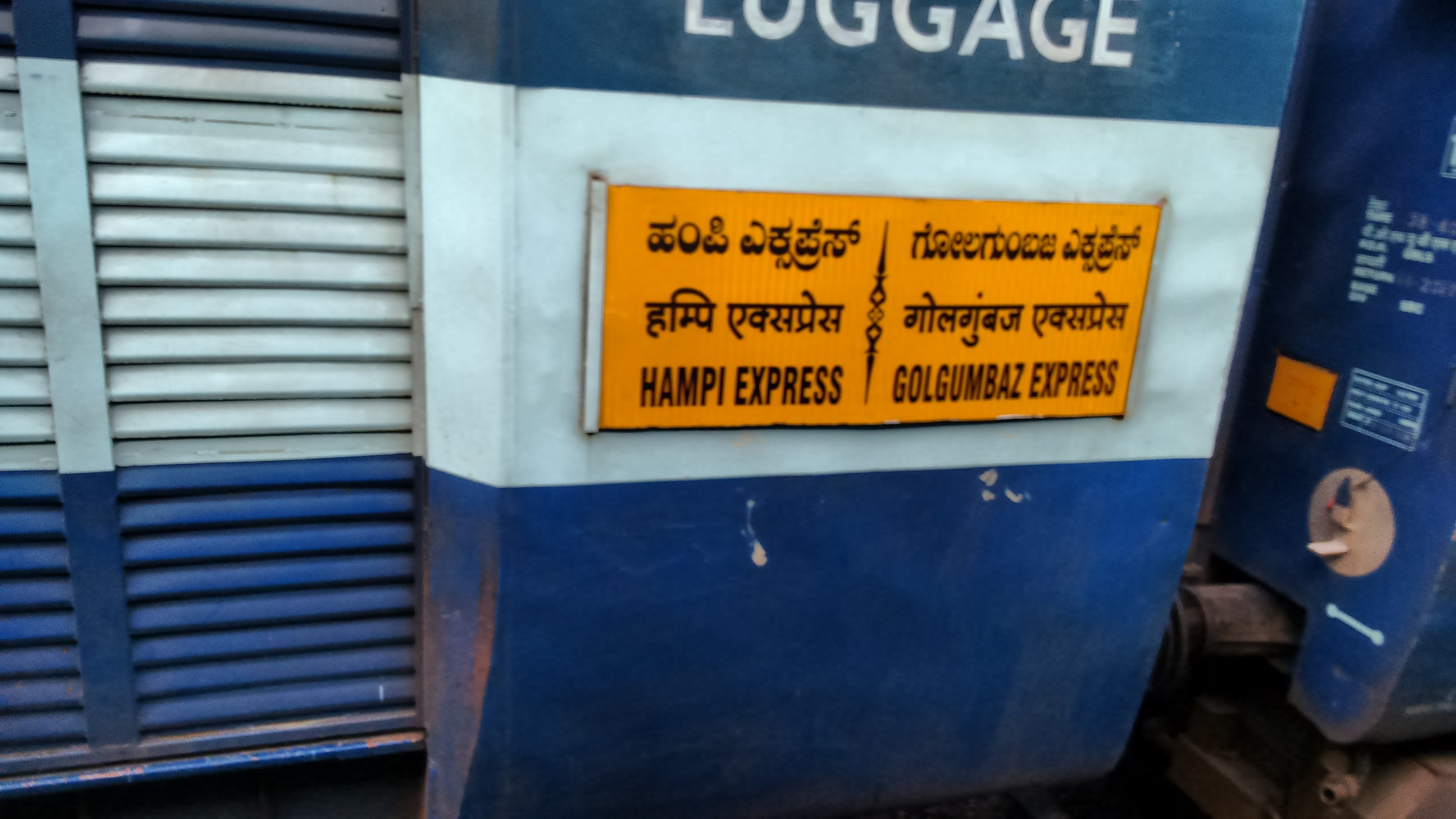

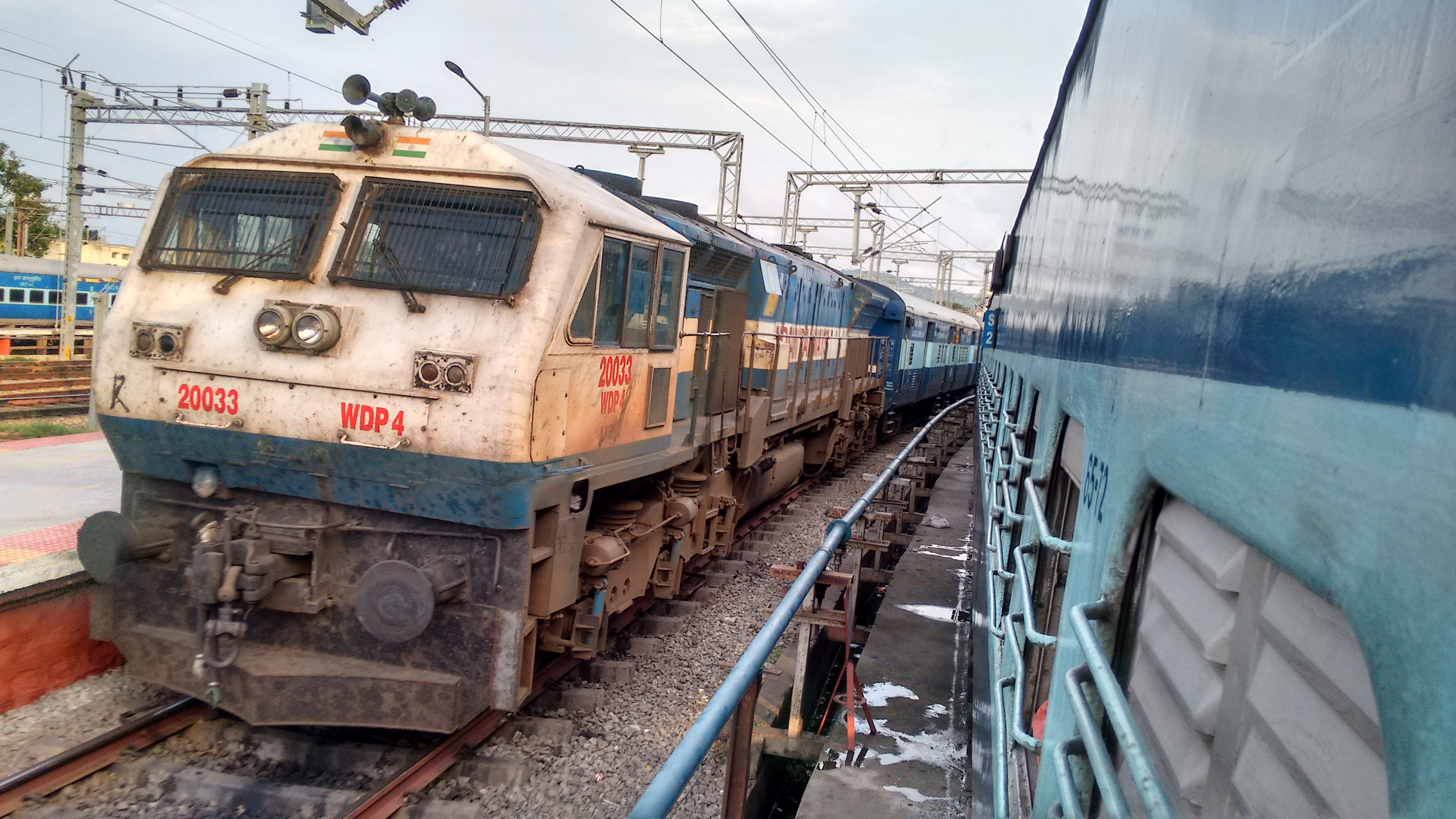

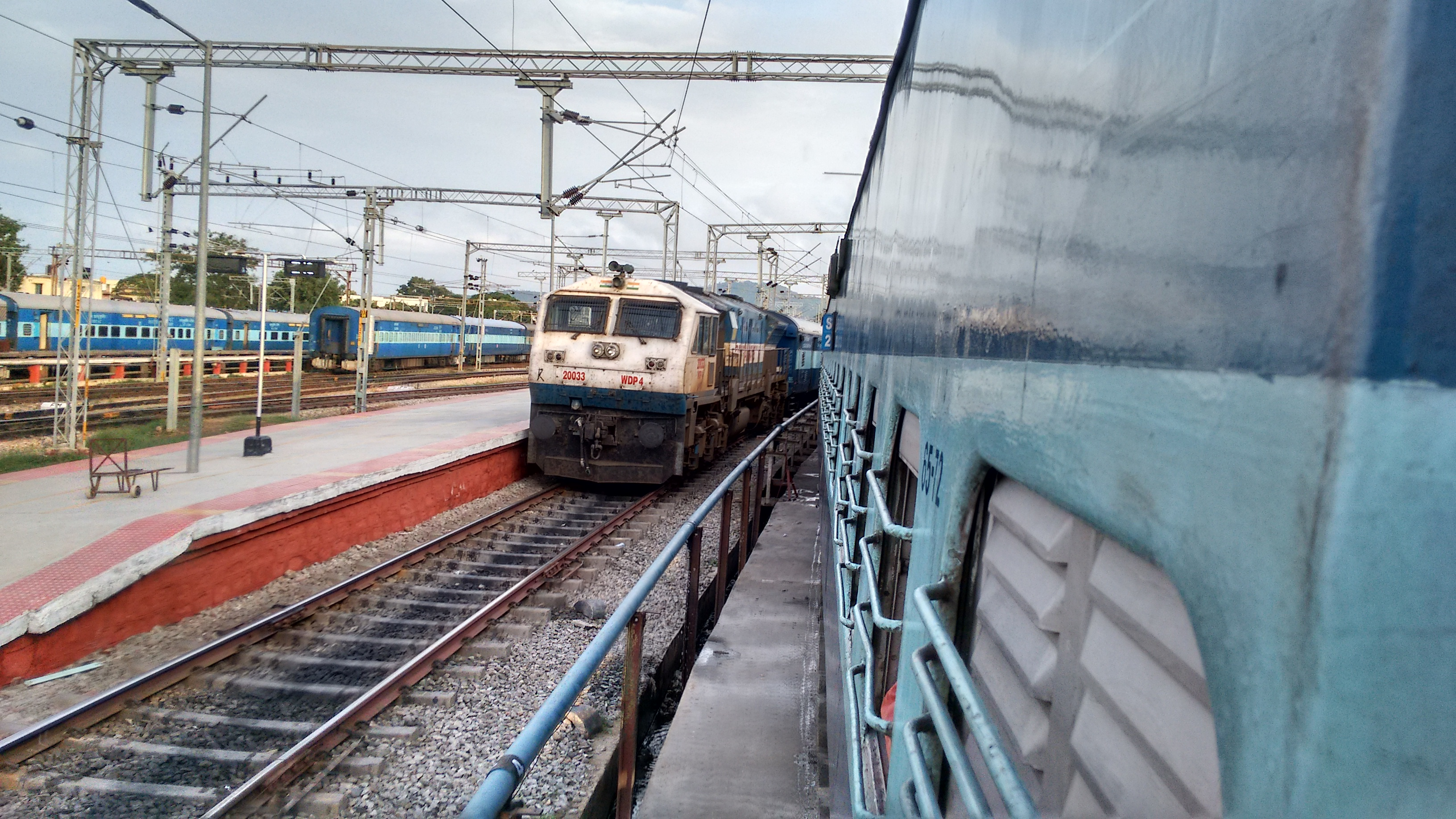

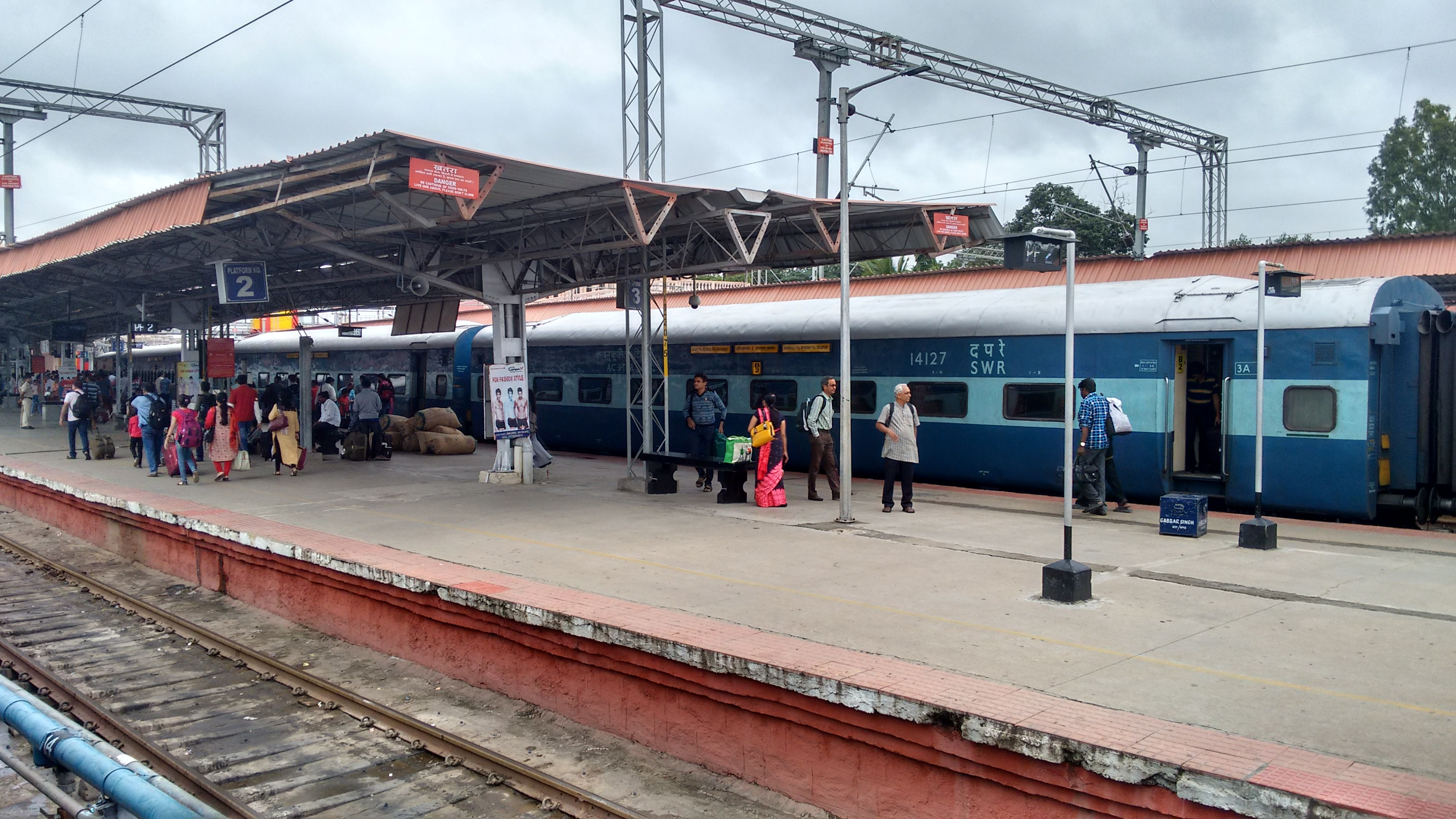

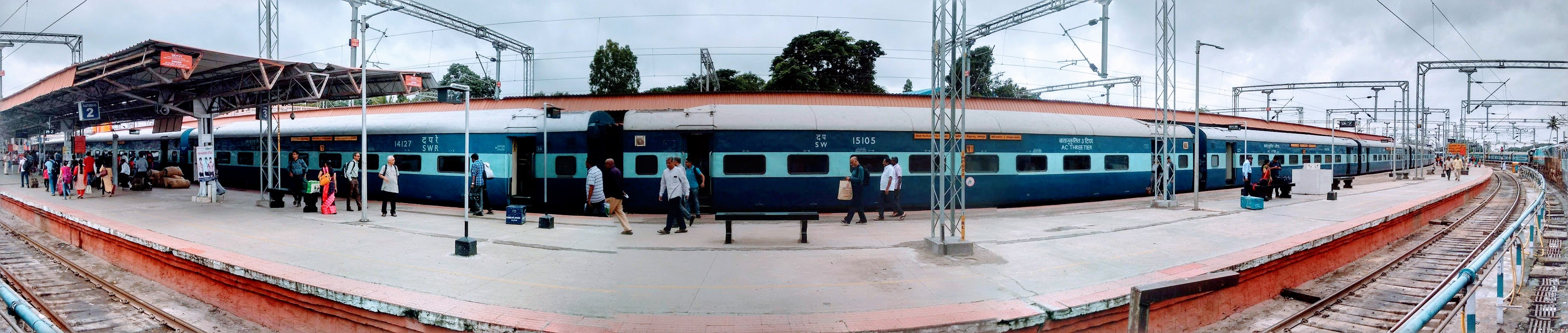
Panorama view of Hampi & Gol Gumbaz Express rake parked at Mysore junction

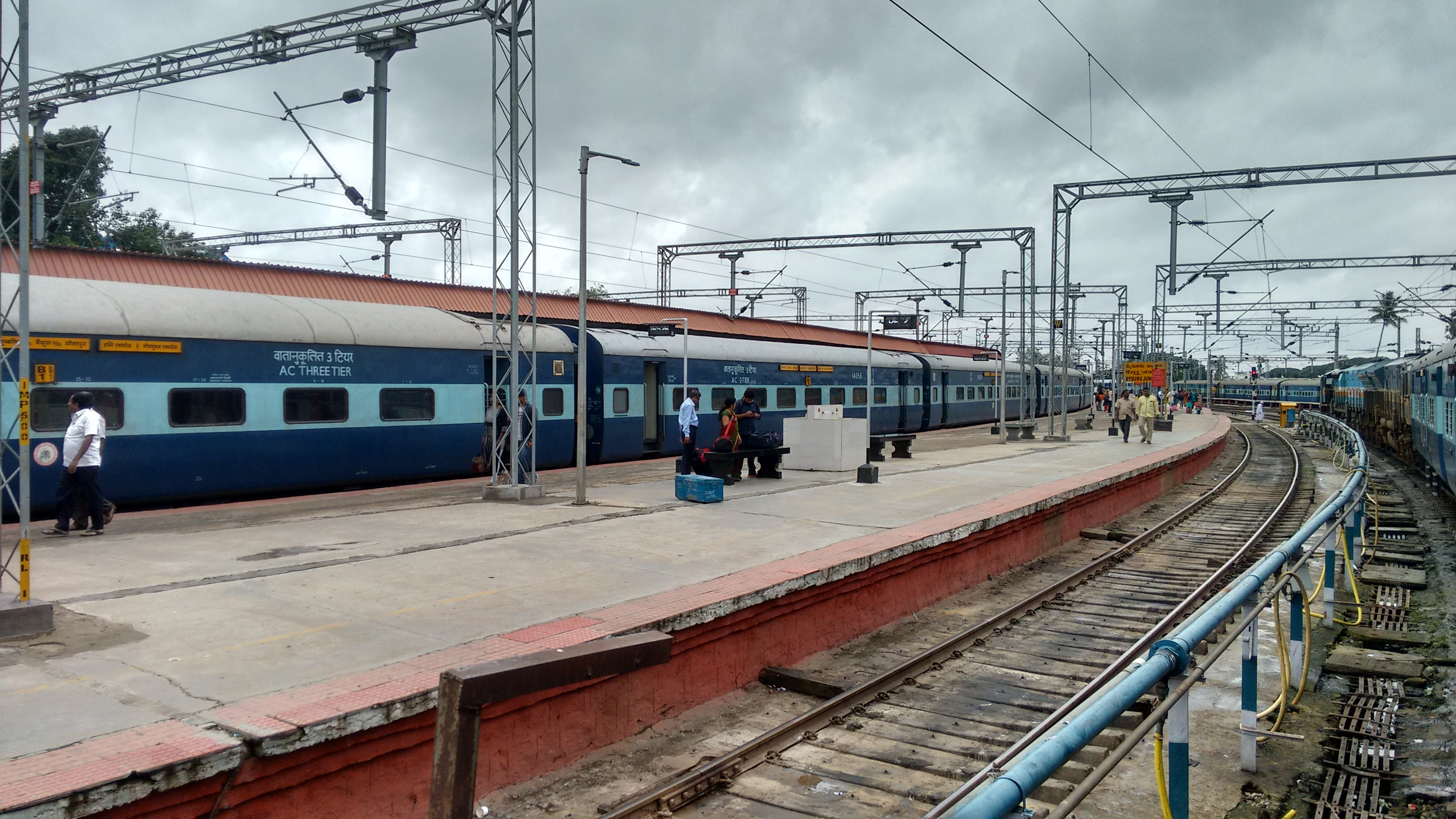

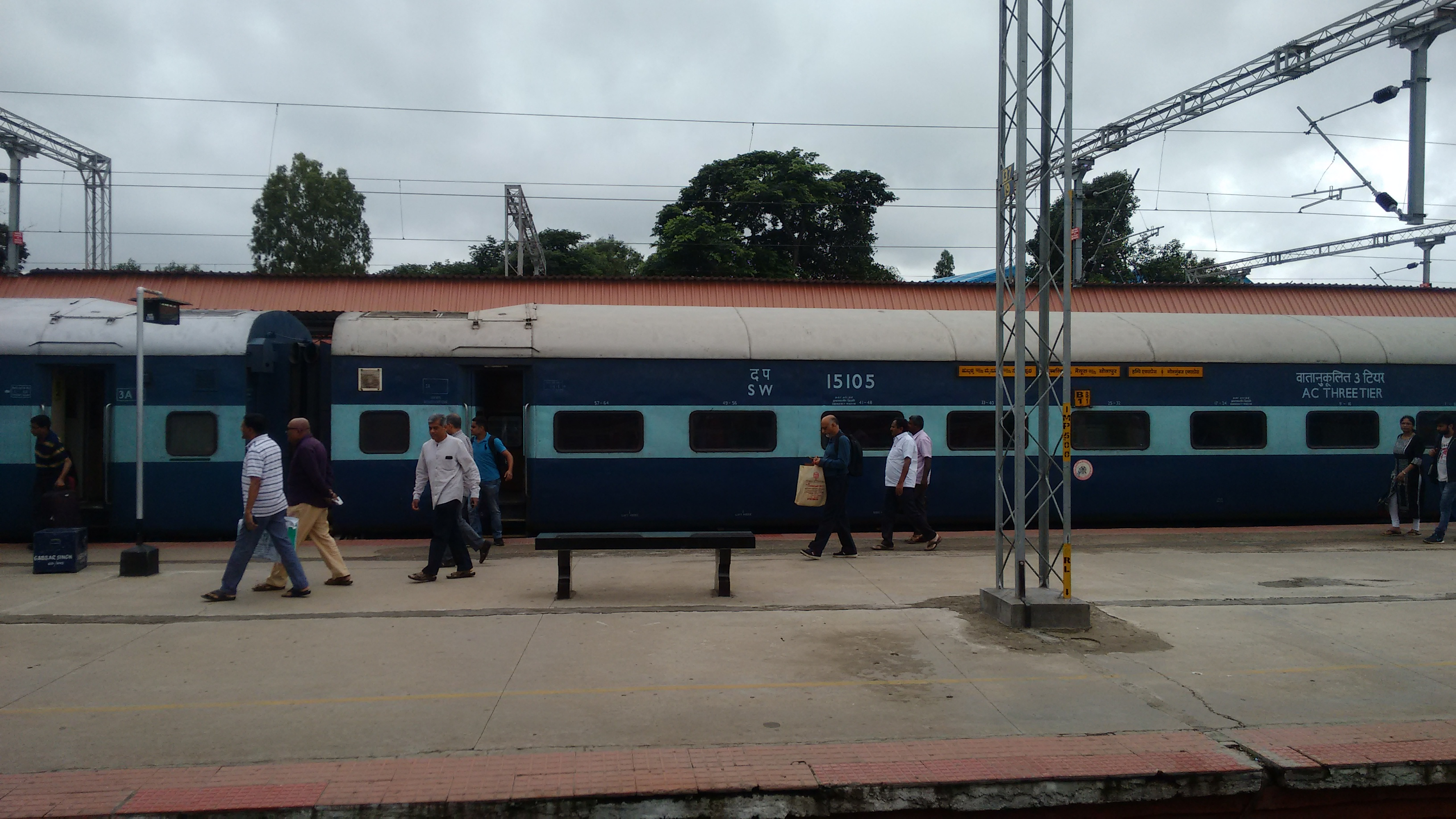
