= Haveri railway station =

Railway station in Karnataka, India

Shree Mahadevappa Mailara Railway Station - Haveri Śrī Mahādēvappa Mailāra Railu Nildāṇa - Hāvēri

General information
- Other names: SMM Haveri; Haveri Station
- Location: Haveri, Karnataka; India
- Elevation: 558 metres (1,831 ft)
- System: Indian Railways station
- Owner: Indian Railways
- Operator: South Western Railway
- Platforms: 3
- Tracks: 5

Construction
- Structure type: Standard (on ground station)
- Parking: No
- Cycle facilities: No

Other information
- Status: Functioning
- Station code: HVR
- Zone(s): South Western Railway
- Division(s): Mysore
Location

Shree Mahadevappa Mailara Railway Station - Haveri is a main railway station in Haveri district, Karnataka. Its code is HVR. It serves Haveri town. The station consists of three platforms.
