= Konkan Railway Corporation =

Indian railway company

Konkan Railway Corporation Ltd. कोंकण रेलवे कॉर्पोरेशन लिमिटेड
- Type: Public sector undertaking
- Industry: Railways
- Founded: 19 July 1990
- Headquarters: CBD Belapur, Navi Mumbai
- Area served: Maharashtra, Goa and Karnataka
- Key people: Santosh Kumar Jha (Chairman & MD)
- Revenue: ▲₹5,152.23 crore (US$550 million) (2022-23)
- Operating income: ▼₹236.52 crore (US$25 million) (2019)
- Net income: ▼₹102.00 crore (US$11 million) (2019)
- Total assets: ▲₹6,114.70 crore (US$650 million) (2019)
- Total equity: ▲₹2,068.53 crore (US$220 million) (2019)
- Number of employees: 5,425 (2022-2023)
- Parent: Government of India (100%)
- Website: KonkanRailway.com

Konkan Railway Corporation Limited (KRCL) is an Indian public sector undertaking which operates Konkan Railway and also undertakes other railway-related projects. It is wholly owned by the Government of India under the administrative control of the Ministry of Railways and headquartered at CBD Belapur in Navi Mumbai. The railway (railroad) route of KRCL covers the coastal districts of Maharashtra, Goa and Karnataka states of India.

The company started its full operations of trains on 26 January 1998. The first passenger train which ran on Konkan railway tracks on 20 March 1993 between Udupi and Mangalore. Konkan Railway Corporation is at the forefront of research and development of new technologies and concepts for Indian railways. During its initial years of operations in the mountainous Konkan region, a spate of accidents prompted Konkan Railway to investigate new technologies. The anti-collision devices, the Sky Bus and RORO are a few of Konkan Railway's innovations.The Konkan Railway Corporation Limited (KRCL) first became profitable in the financial year 2009-10 and earned profit Rupees 2.84 crores in the fiscal year 2010-11. In the financial year 2023-24 KRCL earned net profit of 301 crores of Indian Rupees.

== RORO ==
RORO means Roll-on/roll-off, where loaded trucks are directly carried by railway wagons to their destination. The first ever RO-RO service in India was run by Konkan Railway. Konkan Railway passes through tough terrains of India. There is NH-66 passing through same route. Truck drivers find it extremely difficult to drive loaded trucks through Western Ghats, undulating surfaces, narrow roads and poor road and weather conditions. The KRC came with concept of RORO, where loaded trucks are moved on wagons and are travelled by train. This has helped in saving fuel, decrease in wear and tear of lorries (trucks), relief to drivers of driving in extreme conditions, and faster arrival of the trucks to destination. This also helps decrease road congestion and pollution. This concept has been beneficial for both truck operators and KRCL.

== Stations ==
As on 31 March 2024, Konkan Railway Corporation Limited (KRCL) which operates and maintains Konkan Railway (KR) railway line length of 738.941 Kilometre from Roha to Thokur. 381.81 Kilometre in the state of Maharashtra, 106 in Goa and 251.76 Kilometre in the state of Karnataka It has total seventy two railway stations out of which sixty eight are crossing stations and four are halt stations. Maharashtra has 37, Goa has 10 and Karnataka state has 23 crossing and 2 halt stations.This is the partial list of railway stations coming under the jurisdiction of Konkan Railway Corporation Limited. The list of railway (railroad) stations is from the South to the North direction. Most of the long-distance trains carrying passenger trains (all types) have a stop or halt in at least one place of each district of states through which particular train runs.

Trains running through Konkan Railway Corporation Limited built railway route (track) have two timetables every year one in non monsoon (normal) and another monsoon time table due to speed restrictions imposed during monsoon (rainy) season. The KRCL railway line passes through heavy rainfall and undulating region of India.Monsoon timetable is usually from 10 June to 20 October every year.

| # | Station Name | Station Code | Division | State |
|---|---|---|---|---|
| 1 | Kolad | KOL | Ratnagiri | Maharashtra |
| 2 | Indapur | INP | Ratnagiri | Maharashtra |
| 3 | Mangaon | MNI | Ratnagiri | Maharashtra |
| 4 | Goregaon Road | GNO | Ratnagiri | Maharashtra |
| 5 | Veer | VEER | Ratnagiri | Maharashtra |
| 6 | Sape Wamane | SAPE | Ratnagiri | Maharashtra |
| 7 | Karanjadi | KFD | Ratnagiri | Maharashtra |
| 8 | Vinhere | VINH | Ratnagiri | Maharashtra |
| 9 | Diwankhavati | DWV | Ratnagiri | Maharashtra |
| 10 | Kalambani Budurk | KLBN | Ratnagiri | Maharashtra |
| 11 | Khed | KHED | Ratnagiri | Maharashtra |
| 12 | Anjani | ANO | Ratnagiri | Maharashtra |
| 13 | Chiplun | CHI | Ratnagiri | Maharashtra |
| 14 | Kamathe | KMAH | Ratnagiri | Maharashtra |
| 15 | Sawarda | SVX | Ratnagiri | Maharashtra |
| 16 | Aravali Road | AVRD | Ratnagiri | Maharashtra |
| 17 | Kadavai | KDVI | Ratnagiri | Maharashtra |
| 18 | Sangameshwar Road | SGR | Ratnagiri | Maharashtra |
| 19 | Ukshi | UKC | Ratnagiri | Maharashtra |
| 20 | Bhoke | BOKE | Ratnagiri | Maharashtra |
| 21 | Ratnagiri | RN | Ratnagiri | Maharashtra |
| 22 | Nivasar | NIV | Ratnagiri | Maharashtra |
| 23 | Adavali | ADVI | Ratnagiri | Maharashtra |
| 24 | Veravali | VRLI | Ratnagiri | Maharashtra |
| 25 | Vilavade | VID | Ratnagiri | Maharashtra |
| 26 | Saundal | SUAL | Ratnagiri | Maharashtra |
| 27 | Rajapur Road | RAJP | Ratnagiri | Maharashtra |
| 28 | Kharepatan Road | KRPN | Ratnagiri | Maharashtra |
| 29 | Vaibhavwadi Road | VBW | Ratnagiri | Maharashtra |
| 30 | Achirne | ACRN | Ratnagiri | Maharashtra |
| 31 | Nandgaon Road | NAN | Ratnagiri | Maharashtra |
| 32 | Kankavli | KKW | Ratnagiri | Maharashtra |
| 33 | Sindhudurg | SNDD | Ratnagiri | Maharashtra |
| 34 | Kudal | KUDL | Ratnagiri | Maharashtra |
| 35 | Zarap | ZARP | Ratnagiri | Maharashtra |
| 36 | Sawantwadi Road | SWV | Ratnagiri | Maharashtra |
| 37 | Madure | MADR | Ratnagiri | Maharashtra |
| 38 | Pernem | PERN | Karwar | Goa |
| 39 | Thivim | THVM | Karwar | Goa |
| 40 | Karmali | KRMI | Karwar | Goa |
| 41 | Verna | VEN | Karwar | Goa |
| 42 | Majorda Junction | MJO | Karwar | Goa |
| 43 | Suravali | SRVX | Karwar | Goa |
| 43 | Madgaon Junction | MAO | Karwar | Goa |
| 45 | Balli | BLLI | Karwar | Goa |
| 46 | Canacona | CNO | Karwar | Goa |
| 47 | Loliem | LOL | Karwar | Goa |
| 48 | Asnoti | AT | Karwar | Karnataka |
| 49 | Karwar | KAWR | Karwar | Karnataka |
| 50 | Harwada | HAA | Karwar | Karnataka |
| 51 | Ankola | ANKL | Karwar | Karnataka |
| 52 | Gokarna Road | GOK | Karwar | Karnataka |
| 53 | Mirjan | MRJN | Karwar | Karnataka |
| 54 | Kumta | KT | Karwar | Karnataka |
| 55 | Honnavar | HNA | Karwar | Karnataka |
| 56 | Manki | MANK | Karwar | Karnataka |
| 57 | Murdeshwar | MRDW | Karwar | Karnataka |
| 58 | Chitrapur | CTTP | Karwar | Karnataka |
| 59 | Bhatkal | BTJL | Karwar | Karnataka |
| 60 | Shiroor | SHMI | Karwar | Karnataka |
| 61 | Mookambika Road Byndoor | BYNR | Karwar | Karnataka |
| 62 | Bijoor | BIJR | Karwar | Karnataka |
| 63 | Senapura | SEN | Karwar | Karnataka |
| 63 | Kundapura | KUDA | Karwar | Karnataka |
| 65 | Barkur | BKJ | Karwar | Karnataka |
| 66 | Udupi | UD | Karwar | Karnataka |
| 67 | Innanje | INJ | Karwar | Karnataka |
| 68 | Padubidri | PDD | Karwar | Karnataka |
| 69 | Nandikoor | NAND | Karwar | Karnataka |
| 70 | Mulki | MULK | Karwar | Karnataka |
| 71 | Surathkal | SL | Karwar | Karnataka |
| 72 | Thokur | TOK | Karwar | Karnataka |

== Other projects ==
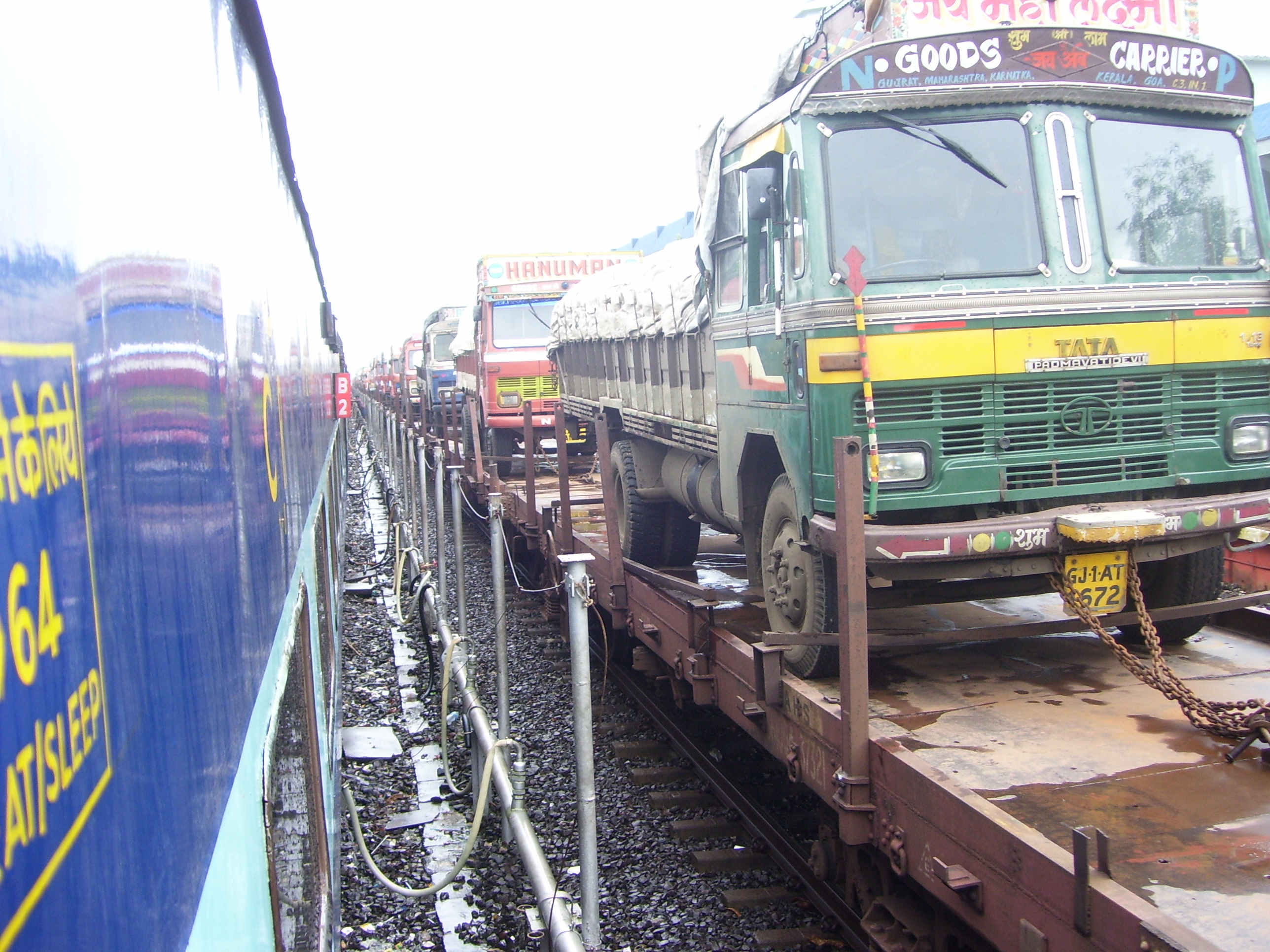
Trucks on train, RORO

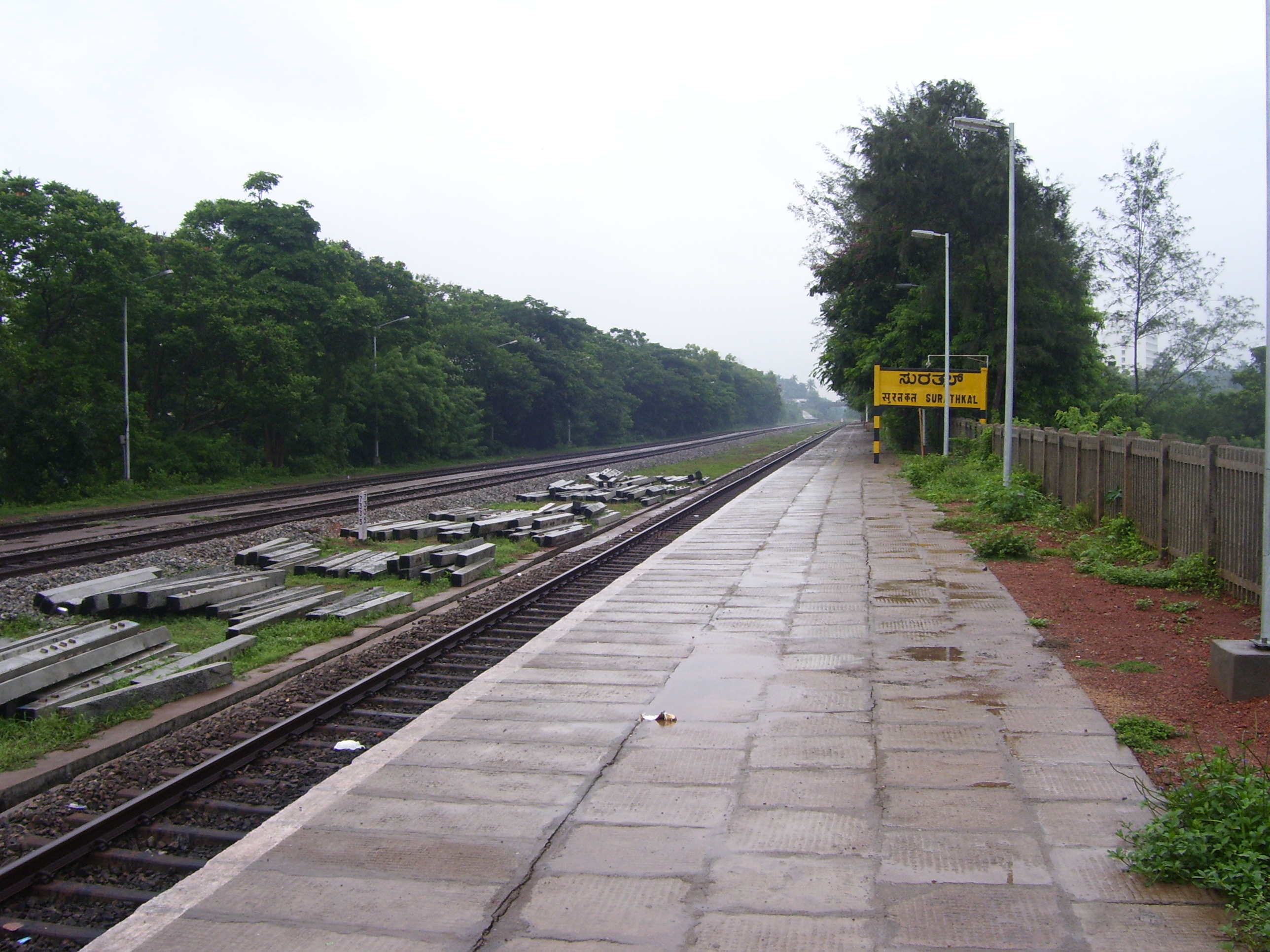
Surathkal station on Konkan Railway route

Konkan Railway Corporation Limited(KRCL) executes other projects for the government of India and state governments. It is one of the contractor for Udampur- Sringar- Baramulla Rail link Project (USBRL) assigned to build a tunnel in that project. KRCL has been selected to prepare Detailed Project Report(DPR) by Kerala state government to build a tunnel to ease traffic congestion on Wayanad- Kozhikode road.

Konkan Railways has played a major role in Construction & Design of Chenab Bridge.

Konkan Railway Corporation Limited(KRCL) completed doubling of tracks from Roha railway station to Veer railway station and Matsyagandha Express train (02619) became first train to travel in down ( LTT to Mangaluru) route of doubled track from Roha to Veer on 30 August 2021 at 19.35 hours.

KRCL has taken over the operation and maintenance of Navi Mumbai metro from 1 April 2024 for three years.

Konkan Railway has supplied two Diesel Electric Multiple Unit (DEMU ) trains to Nepal to run between Jaynagar (Jainagar), Bihar to Kurtha near Janakpur, Nepal. as part of India–Nepal Railway Connectivity Project.

== See also ==
- George Fernandes Institute of Tunnel Technology
- Konkan Railway
- Konkan kanya Express
- Matsyagandha Express
- Intermodal flatcar
- Intermodal freight transport
- Modalohr
- Piggy-back
- Roadrailer
- Rolling highway
