= Balli railway station =

Railway station in Goa, India

Balli Railway Station

General information
- Location: Off NH-17, Quepem, South Goa, Goa; India
- Coordinates: 15.1517°N 74.0212°E
- Elevation: 41 metres (135 ft)
- System: Regional rail and Light rail station
- Owner: Indian Railways
- Operator: Konkan Railway
- Line: Konkan Railway
- Platforms: 1
- Tracks: 3

Construction
- Structure type: Standard (on-ground station)
- Parking: Available
- Cycle facilities: Available
- Accessible: Yes

Other information
- Status: Functioning
- Station code: BLLI
- Zone(s): Konkan Railway
- Division(s): Karwar
- Fare zone: Indian Railways

History
- Opened: 1997; 29 years ago

Services
Preceding station	Indian Railways	Following station
Madgaon Junction towards Roha	Konkan Railway Konkan Railway	Canacona towards Thokur
Route map
Location
- Location within Goa

Balli Railway Station (Station code: BLLI) is a smaller railway station in Goa, under the jurisdiction of Konkan Railway. It lies is in Balli (also referred to as Bali) village off the highway connecting Chandor to Canacona.At presentit next rail station south of Madagaon junction.

== Administration ==
Balli railway station was built by Konkan Railway Corporation Limited (KRCL) and is operated and maintained by them. The station falls under the administration of Karwar railway division of Konkan Railway zone, a subsidiary zone of Indian Railways.

== Other stations ==
Madgaon (Margao) railway station in South Goa district is the largest Konkan Railway station within Goa, while Thivim railway station in North Goa comes at second place. The former is a gateway to South Goa, Margao, the urban area of Vasco da Gama and also the beaches of South Goa, while the latter is a gateway to Mapusa town, the emigration-oriented sub-district of Bardez and also the North Goa beach belt. The Karmali railway station is closest State capital Panjim or Panaji, which is the administrative capital of Goa.

== Incidents ==
On 3 May 2015, 10 bogies of 12223 Mumbai Lokmanya Tilak Terminus–Ernakulam Junction Duronto Express derailed near Balli railway station in South Goa at around 6.30 AM. No casualties.
