= Suravali railway station =

Railway station in Goa, India

Suravali Railway Station

General information
- Location: Madgaon–Betalbatim Road, Suravali, Madgaon, Salcete, South Goa, Goa; India
- Coordinates: 15.2918°N 73.9389°E
- Elevation: 19 metres (62 ft)
- System: Regional rail and Light rail station
- Owner: Indian Railways
- Operator: Konkan Railway
- Line: Konkan Railway
- Platforms: 2
- Tracks: 2

Construction
- Structure type: Standard (on-ground station)
- Accessible: Yes

Other information
- Status: Functioning
- Station code: SRVX
- Zone(s): Konkan Railway
- Division(s): Karwar
- Fare zone: Indian Railways

History
- Opened: 1997; 29 years ago

Services
Preceding station	Indian Railways	Following station
Majorda Junction towards Roha	Konkan Railway Konkan Railway	Madgaon Junction towards Thokur
Route map
Location
- Location within Goa

Suravali Railway Station (its name is mainly spelt as Seraulim locally) is a smaller railway station in Goa.

== Administration ==
The station falls under the jurisdiction of Konkan Railway. It lies along the Margao to Betalbatim road, at Seraulim village and is under Karwar railway region of Konkan Railway zone, a subsidiary zone of Indian Railways. Suravali uses the four-letter code of SRVX.

== Location and structure ==
It has two platforms. It has a dual broad-gauge track, and is considered a "halt" station. There are 14 trains which halt here, but no originating or terminating trains in this rather small station. It is located in the Salcete taluka of Goa. It is situated 16 kilometres (9.9 mi) from Goa's Dabolim airport (GOI), and is at a height of 19 metres (62 ft) above sea level.

== Other stations ==
Madgaon (Margao) railway station in South Goa district is the largest Konkan Railway station within Goa, while Thivim railway station in North Goa comes at second place. The former is a gateway to South Goa, Margao, the urban area of Vasco da Gama and also the beaches of South Goa, while the latter is a gateway to Mapusa town, the emigration-oriented sub-district of Bardez and also the North Goa beach belt. The Karmali railway station is closest to State capital Panjim or Panaji, which is the administrative capital of Goa.
