= Pernem railway station =

Railway station in Goa, India

Pernem Railway Station

General information
- Location: Pernem, North Goa, Goa; India
- Coordinates: 15.7084°N 73.8173°E
- Elevation: 18 metres (59 ft)
- System: Regional rail and Light rail station
- Owner: Indian Railways
- Operator: Konkan Railway
- Line: Konkan Railway
- Platforms: 2
- Tracks: 2

Construction
- Structure type: Standard (on-ground station)
- Parking: Yes
- Accessible: Yes

Other information
- Status: Functioning
- Station code: PERN
- Zone(s): Konkan Railway
- Division(s): Karwar
- Fare zone: Indian Railways

History
- Opened: 1997; 29 years ago

Services
Preceding station	Indian Railways	Following station
Madure towards Roha	Konkan Railway Konkan Railway	Thivim towards Thokur
Route map
Location
- Location within Goa

Pernem railway station (Station code: PERN) is a railway station in North Goa district of Goa state.

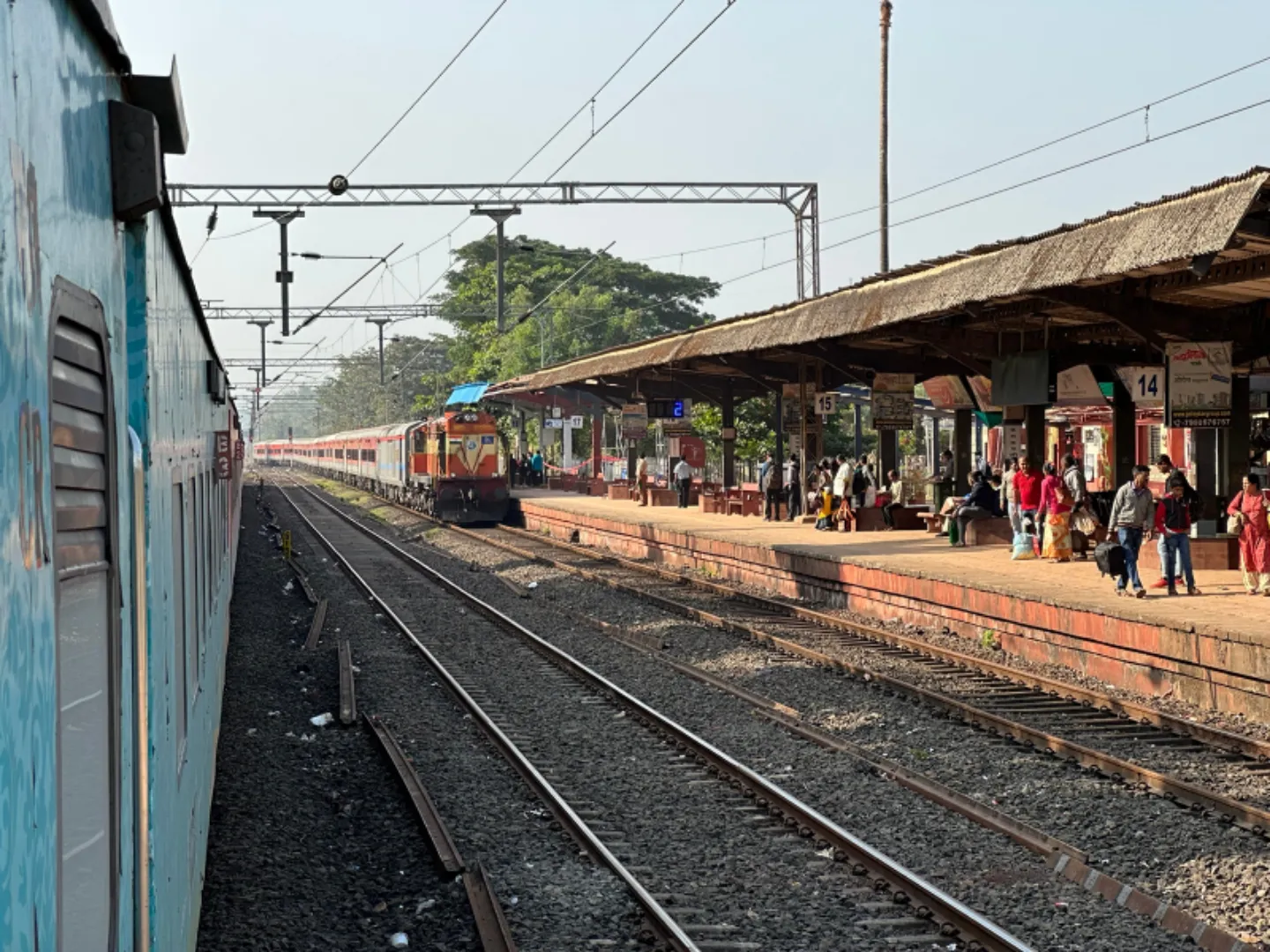
Sindudurg Express entering Pernem station

It is part of the Konkan Railway, in the town of Pernem in the North Goa district of Goa State and is under Karwar railway division of Konkan Railway zone, a subsidiary zone of Indian Railways.

== History ==
The 5,002 feet (1,525 m) Pernem Tunnel on the line was begun in 1992, but had a lengthy history of repeated tunnel collapses that held up completion of the entire line through Pernem until 1998. The chief engineer of the tunnel construction was later to characterize it as "a job from hell", with repeated floods caused by monsoon weather that could wash away months of work in a matter of hours. Nine workers died during the Pernem Tunnel construction alone, out of the 74 deaths across the entire Konkan Railway project.

A 5 metres (16 ft) section of the tunnel collapsed again in August 2020, and required 40 days work to restore service, reinforcing the tunnel with steel plates; all of which had to be done during the lockdown restrictions imposed to counter the COVID-19 pandemic in India.

On July 9, 2024, water was seen seeping into the tunnel at 14:35, leading to disruptions in the train services of Konkan Railways. The waterlogging caused was cleared and at 22:13, trains were allowed to pass through the tunnel at a speed of 5 km/h. However, on the next day at 03:00, the issue reoccurred. As of July 10, 2024 several trains have been cancelled or diverted and the tunnel has not yet been cleared.

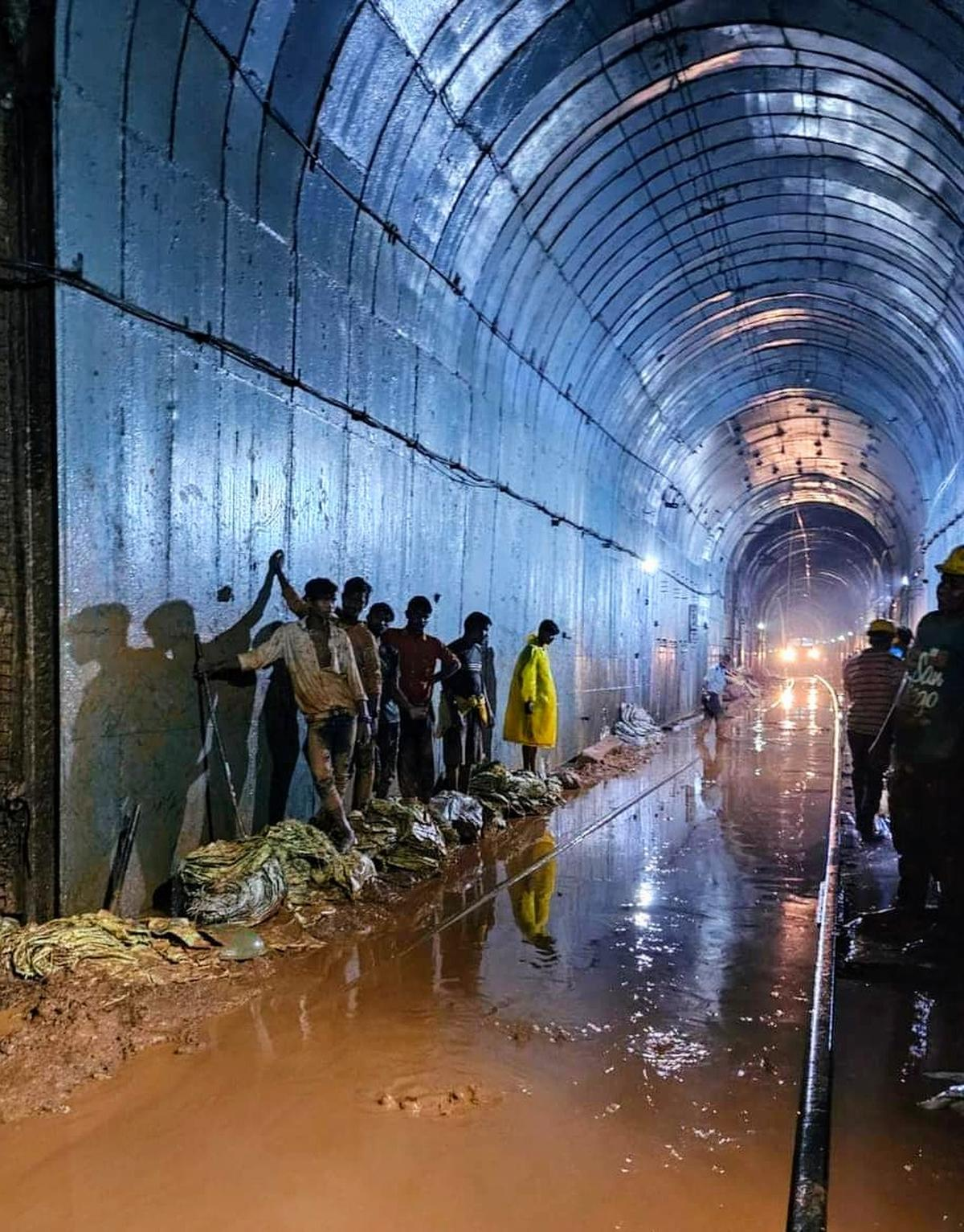
Inundation in Pernem Tunnel that had been disrupting train services.

== Structure ==
It is located at 18 metres (59 ft) above sea level and has two platforms. As of 2016, a single broad-gauge railway line exists at this station, and 14 trains stop at Pernem. The Goa Airport situated at Dabolim is at distance of 38 kilometres (24 mi) from this railway station.

== Sources ==
- Kerr, Ian J. (2007). Engines of Change: The Railroads That Made India. Transportation and Society Series. Bloomsbury Academic. ISBN 9780275985646. ISSN 1932-4766.
- Tarrant, Chris (2016). Chris Tarrant's Extreme Railway Journeys. Kings Road Publishing. ISBN 9781786063663.
- Wolmar, Christian (2017). Railways and The Raj: How the Age of Steam Transformed India. Atlantic Books. ISBN 9781782397663.
- Maad, Givnd Kamat (20 September 2020). "After 40 days, railway experts fortify Pernem tunnel in Goa". The Times of India.
