= Verna railway station =

Railway station in Goa, India

Verna Railway Station

General information
- Location: Nagoa–Cansaulim Road, Verna, Salcete, South Goa, Goa; India
- Coordinates: 15.3539°N 73.9124°E
- Elevation: 9 metres (30 ft)
- System: Regional rail and Light rail station
- Owner: Indian Railways
- Operator: Konkan Railway
- Line: Konkan Railway
- Platforms: 1
- Tracks: 2

Construction
- Structure type: Standard (on-ground station)
- Accessible: Yes

Other information
- Status: Functioning
- Station code: VEN
- Zone(s): Konkan Railway
- Division(s): Karwar
- Fare zone: Indian Railways

History
- Opened: 1997; 29 years ago
- Electrified: Completed

Services
Preceding station	Indian Railways	Following station
Karmali towards Roha	Konkan Railway Konkan Railway	Majorda Junction towards Thokur
Route map
Location
- Location within Goa

Verna Railway Station (Station code: VEN) is a railway station in Nagoa – Cansaulim Road, Verna, Salcete, South Goa, Goa.

== Other stations ==
It falls under Karwar railway division of Konkan Railway zone, a subsidiary zone of Indian Railways. under the jurisdiction of Konkan Railway.

== Location ==
It lies is in Verna village near Cansaulim and is nearby Madgaon (Margao) railway station in South Goa district is the largest Konkan Railway station within Goa, while Thivim or Tivim railway station in North Goa comes at second place. The former is a gateway to South Goa, Margao, the urban area of Vasco da Gama and also the beaches of South Goa, while the latter is a gateway to Mapusa town, the emigration-oriented sub-district of Bardez and also the North Goa beach belt. The Karmali railway station is closest State capital Panjim or Panaji, which is the administrative capital of Goa.
