= Diwankhavati railway station =

Railway Station in Maharashtra, India

General information
- Coordinates: 17.8552°N 73.4182°E
- Owner: Indian Railways
- Line: Konkan Railway
- Platforms: 2
- Tracks: 2

Construction
- Structure type: on Ground Station

Other information
- Status: Active
- Station code: DWV
- Fare zone: Konkan Railway

History
- Opened: 1998
- Closed: No

Services
Preceding station	Indian Railways	Following station
Vinhere towards Roha	Konkan Railway Konkan Railway	Khed towards Thokur
Route map
Location
- Location within Maharashtra

Diwankhavati railway station is a station on Konkan Railway. It is at a distance of 80.585 km (50.1 mi) down from origin. The preceding station on the line is Vinhere railway station and the next station is Khed railway station.

Diwankhavati railway station was built by Konkan Railway Corporation Limited as a part of new railway line project connecting Mumbai city to Mangaluru city in Karnataka state whose work started in 1990 A.D.
