= Majorda Junction railway station =

Railway station in Goa, India

Majorda Junction Railway Station

General information
- Location: Nuvem Road, South Goa, Goa; India
- Coordinates: 15.3137°N 73.9220°E
- Elevation: 108 metres (354 ft)
- System: Express train and Passenger train station
- Owner: Indian Railways
- Operator: Konkan Railway
- Platforms: 2
- Tracks: 4
- Connections: Auto stand

Construction
- Structure type: Standard (on-ground station)
- Parking: No
- Cycle facilities: No

Other information
- Status: Functioning
- Station code: MJO
- Zone(s): Konkan Railway
- Division(s): Karwar

Services
| Preceding station | Indian Railways | Following station |
|---|---|---|
| Verna towards Roha | Konkan Railway Konkan Railway | Suravali towards Thokur |
| Cansaulim towards ? | South Western Railway zone Guntakal–Vasco da Gama section | Suravali towards ? |
Route map
Location
- Location within Goa

Majorda Junction Railway Station (Station code: MJO) a small Junction station in South Goa district, Goa. It is located near Majorda village. The station consists of two platforms.
