= Gokarna Road railway station =

Railway station in Karnataka, India

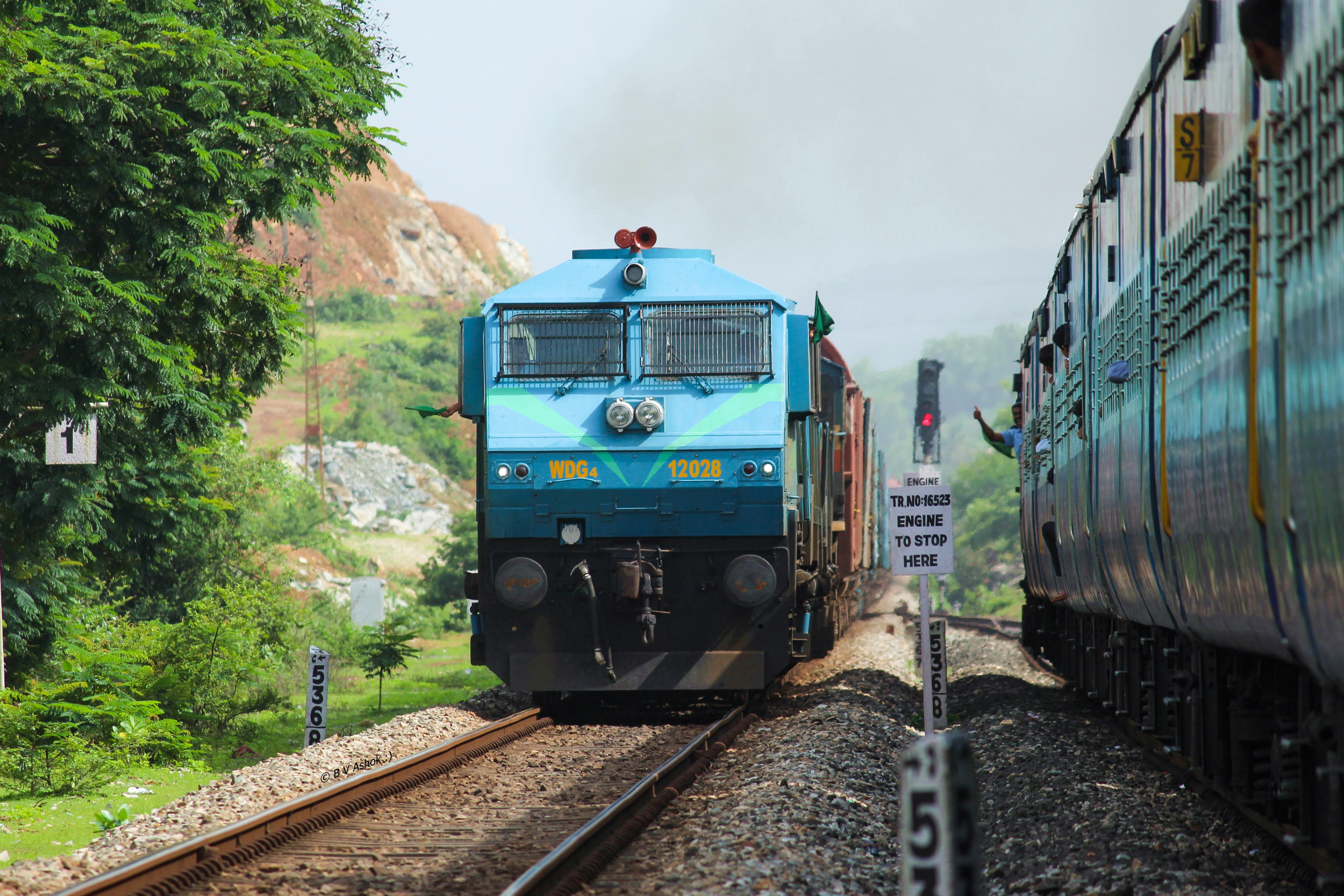
- A BCNHL rake at Gokarna Road railway station

General information
- Coordinates: 14.5839°N 74.3677°E
- System: Indian Railways Station
- Owner: Indian Railways
- Line: Konkan Railway
- Platforms: 2
- Tracks: 2

Other information
- Status: Active
- Station code: GOK

Services
| Preceding station | Indian Railways | Following station |
|---|---|---|
| Ankola towards Roha | Konkan Railway Konkan Railway | Kumta towards Thokur |
Route map
Location
- Location within India Location within Karnataka

Gokarna Road railway station is a station on division of Konkan Railway in Gokarna, Karnataka. It is at a distance of 536.941 km (333.6 mi) from northern most starting point Roha of Konkan Railway Corporation jurisdiction.. The preceding station on the line is Ankola railway station and the next station is Mirjan railway station towards Surathkal, Mangaluru. Gokarna road railway station is situated in Kumta taluk of Uttara Kannada district of Karnataka state, India (Bharat). It is built, operated and maintained by Konkan Railway Corporation Limited a public sector company.

The distance between Gokarna Road and Kumta railway stations of 19 km was the longest distance between two train stations on the 741 km Konkan Railway line as on April, 2016. But now Mirjan railway station has been built in between Gokarna Road and Kumta.
