= Anjani railway station =

Railway Station in Maharashtra, India

Anjani Ayani
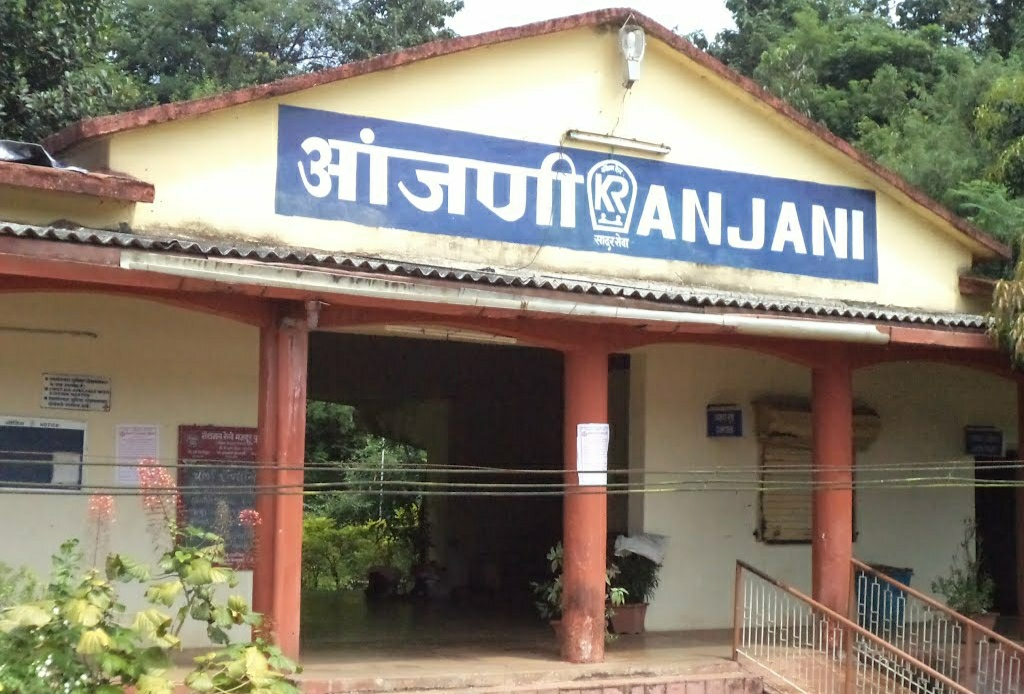

General information
- Location: Tal - khed, dist- Ratnagiri
- Coordinates: 17.6210°N 73.3998°E
- System: Indian Railway Station
- Owner: Indian Railways
- Line: Konkan Railway
- Platforms: 2
- Tracks: 4

Construction
- Structure type: on Ground

Other information
- Status: Active
- Station code: ANO
- Fare zone: konkan railway

Services
Preceding station	Indian Railways	Following station
Khed towards Roha	Konkan Railway Konkan Railway	Chiplun towards Thokur
Route map
Location
- Location within Maharashtra

Anjani railway station is a station on Konkan Railway. Anjani railway station is situated in revenue district of Ratnagiri in Maharashtra state, India. It is at a distance of 111.69 km (69.4 mi) down from Roha. The preceding station on the line is Khed railway station and the next station is Chiplun railway station.

Anjani railway station was built and is operated & maintained by Konkan Railway Corporation (KRCL) a public sector company which was incorporated on 19 July 1990 and obtained certificate of commencement on 20 August 1990.
