= Madure railway station =

Railway Station in Maharashtra, India

Madure

General information
- Location: Madure, Sindhudurg district, Maharashtra
- Coordinates: 15.8666°N 73.7852°E
- System: Regular
- Owner: Indian Railways
- Line: Konkan Railway
- Platforms: 1
- Tracks: 1

Construction
- Structure type: standard on Ground Station

Other information
- Status: Active
- Station code: MADR
- Zone(s): Konkan Railways
- Division(s): Ratnagiri

Services
Preceding station	Indian Railways	Following station
Sawantwadi Road towards Roha	Konkan Railway Konkan Railway	Pernem towards Thokur
Route map
Location
- Location within India Location within Maharashtra

Madure railway station is a train station on the Konkan Railway. It is at a distance of 373.500 km (232.1 mi) down from origin. The preceding station on the line is Sawantwadi Road railway station and the next station is Pernem railway station. This station serves the village of Madura and also it is the last Konkan Railway station in Maharashtra.

The station offers free Wi-Fi.
