= Honnavar railway station =

Railway station in Karnataka, India

General information
- Coordinates: 14.3160°N 74.4324°E
- Owner: Indian Railways
- Line: Konkan Railway
- Platforms: 2
- Tracks: 2

Other information
- Status: Active
- Station code: HNA

Services
| Preceding station | Indian Railways | Following station |
|---|---|---|
| Kumta towards Roha | Konkan Railway Konkan Railway | Manki towards Thokur |
Route map
Location
- Location within Karnataka

Honnavar railway station is a station on Konkan Railway serving the town of Honnavar in coastal Karnataka. It is at a distance of 569.812 km (354.1 mi) down from origin. The preceding station on the line is Kumta railway station and the next station is Manki railway station.
