= Ankola railway station =

Railway station in Karnataka, India

General information
- Coordinates: 14.6454°N 74.3320°E
- Owner: Indian Railways
- Line: Konkan Railway
- Platforms: 1

Other information
- Status: Active
- Station code: ANKL

Services
Preceding station	Indian Railways	Following station
Harwada towards Roha	Konkan Railway Konkan Railway	Gokarna Road towards Thokur
Route map
Location
- Location within Karnataka

Ankola railway station is a station on Konkan Railway. Ankola railway station is located at Uttara Kannada district of Karnataka state, India. It is at a distance of 529.001 km (328.7 mi) down from origin. The preceding station on the line is Harwada railway station and the next station is Gokarna Road railway station.
