= Khed railway station =

Railway Station in Maharashtra, India

Khed खेड

General information
- Location: S.H. 104, Tal- khed, Dist- Ratnagiri
- Coordinates: 17.7126°N 73.4107°E
- Owner: Indian Railways
- Line: Konkan Railway
- Platforms: 2
- Tracks: 4

Construction
- Structure type: On Ground

Other information
- Status: Active
- Station code: KHED
- Fare zone: konkan Railway

Services
Preceding station	Indian Railways	Following station
Diwankhavati towards Roha	Konkan Railway Konkan Railway	Anjani towards Thokur
Route map
Location
- Location within India Location within Maharashtra

Khed railway station is a station on Konkan Railway. It is at a distance of 98.285 km (61.1 mi) down from origin. The preceding station on the line is Diwankhavati railway station and the next station is Anjani railway station.

The station offers free Wi-Fi.
