= Manki railway station =

Railway station in Karnataka, India

General information
- Coordinates: 14.1747°N 74.4937°E
- Owner: Indian Railways
- Line: Konkan Railway
- Platforms: 1
- Tracks: 1

Other information
- Status: Active
- Station code: MANK

Services
| Preceding station | Indian Railways | Following station |
|---|---|---|
| Honnavar towards Roha | Konkan Railway Konkan Railway | Murdeshwar towards Thokur |
Route map
Location
- Location within Karnataka

Manki railway station is a station on Konkan Railway. Manki train station is situated in Uttara Kannada (U.K.) revenue district of Karnataka state in India. It is at a distance of 587.608 km (365.1 mi) down from north most starting point of Konkan railway line Roha. The preceding station on the line is Honnavar railway station and the next station is Murdeshwar railway station. It is the nearest railway station to Idagunji Shri Mahaganapathi Temple and Gunavante.
