= Dabolim railway station =

Railway station in Goa, India

Dabolim Railway Station

General information
- Location: Dabolim, South Goa, Goa; India
- Coordinates: 15.3873°N 73.8514°E
- Elevation: 50 metres (160 ft)
- System: Indian Railways station
- Owner: Indian Railways
- Operator: South Western Railway zone
- Line: Guntakal–Vasco da Gama section
- Platforms: 1
- Tracks: 3
- Connections: Auto stand

Construction
- Structure type: Standard (on-ground station)
- Parking: No
- Cycle facilities: No

Other information
- Status: Functioning
- Station code: DBM
- Zone(s): South Western Railway zone
- Division(s): Hubli

Services
Preceding station	Indian Railways	Following station
Vasco da Gama towards ?	South Western Railway zone Guntakal–Vasco da Gama section	Sankval towards ?
Location

Dabolim Railway Station (station code: DBM) is a main railway station in South Goa district, Goa. Its code is DBM. It serves Dabolim city. The station consists of one platform. It is not well sheltered. It lacks many facilities including water and sanitation. The station is just 5 km from Dabolim Airport.

== Major trains ==
- Vasco da Gama–Kulem Passenger
