= Mirjan railway station =

Railway station in Karnataka, India

Coordinates: 14.5005°N 74.4248°E

Mirjan railway station (Station code:MRJN) is a train station on Konkan Railway Corporation Limited railway route in Uttara Kannada district of Karnataka state,India (Bharat). Its preceding station to the north is Gokarna Road railway station and next station toward the south is Kumta railway station. The foundation stone for Mirjan railway station was laid by Union minister for Railways Mr. Suresh Prabhu on 19 August 2016. It serves the villages of Bargi, Betkeli, Kodkani, Paduvani, Kimani, Divagi, Nagur and Ramnagar.It is nearest railway to tourist destination Mirjan Fort.
