= Sankval railway station =

Railway station in Goa, India

Sankval Railway Station

General information
- Location: National Highway 566, Zuarinagar, Sancoale, South Goa, Goa; India
- Coordinates: 15.3718°N 73.8713°E
- Elevation: 26 metres (85 ft)
- System: Indian Railways station
- Owner: Indian Railways
- Operator: South Western Railway zone
- Line: Guntakal–Vasco da Gama section
- Platforms: 1
- Tracks: 2
- Connections: Auto stand

Construction
- Structure type: Standard (on-ground station)
- Parking: No
- Cycle facilities: No

Other information
- Status: Active
- Station code: SKVL
- Zone(s): South Western Railway zone
- Division(s): Hubli

Services
Preceding station	Indian Railways	Following station
Dabolim towards ?	South Western Railway zone Guntakal–Vasco da Gama section	Cansaulim towards ?
Location

Sankval Railway Station (station code: SKVL) is a main railway station in South Goa district, Goa. It serves Sankval village. The station consists of one platform. The platform is not well sheltered. It lacks many facilities including water and sanitation.

== Major trains ==
- Vasco-da-Gama–Kulem Passenger
