= Cansaulim railway station =

Railway station in Goa, India

Cansaulim Railway Station

General information
- Location: Arossim Beach Road, Cansaulim, South Goa, Goa; India
- Coordinates: 15.3449°N 73.8975°E
- Elevation: 15 metres (49 ft)
- System: Indian Railways station
- Owner: Indian Railways
- Operator: South Western Railway zone
- Line: Guntakal–Vasco da Gama section
- Platforms: 1
- Tracks: 2
- Connections: Auto stand

Construction
- Structure type: Standard (on-ground station)
- Parking: No
- Cycle facilities: No

Other information
- Status: Construction – diesel-line doubling
- Station code: CSM
- Zone(s): South Western Railway zone
- Division(s): Hubli

Services
Preceding station	Indian Railways	Following station
Sankval towards ?	South Western Railway zone Guntakal–Vasco da Gama section	Majorda Junction towards ?
Location

Cansaulim Railway Station (station code: CSM) is a small railway station in South Goa district, Goa. It serves Cansaulim village. The station consists of one platform. The platform is not well sheltered. It lacks many facilities including water and sanitation.

== Major trains ==
- Vasco da Gama–Kulem Passenger
