= Jokatte railway station =

Railway station in Karnataka, India

Coordinates: 12.9595°N 74.8533°E

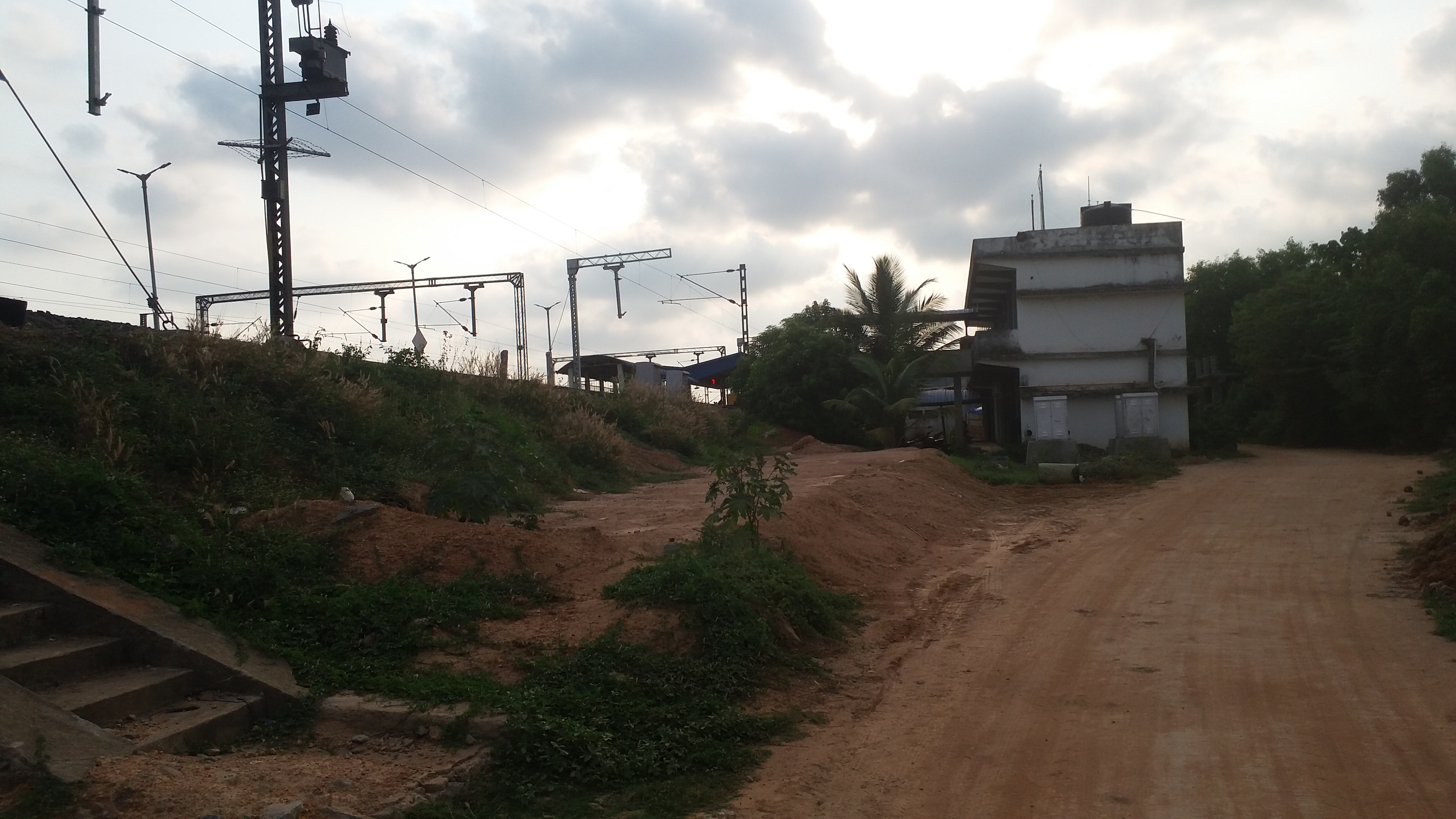
Jokatte railway station, Dakshina Kannada district, Karnataka

Jokatte railway station (JOKT) is in Dakshina Kannada district of Karnataka state, India. It was commissioned in January 2017 at the cost of Rupees Fifty crores. It comes under Mysore railway division of South Western Railway zone under Indian Railways. It was conceived by K.H.Muniappa under UPA rule in 2012 and construction began in 2014. Jokatte railway station is four kilometre away from Mangaluru International Airport. It was constructed to ease train traffic on Panambur to Mangaluru Junction railway station.There has been demand to rename the railway station as Pejawara railway station as it near to Pejawara matha one of the Ashta matha's established by Shri Madhva Acharya The branch of another Ashta mathas of Udupi following Tulu Shivalli Madhva tradition Krishnapura Matha has a branch known as Mudai Matha/Moodai Math/Bailu Pejavara Mata beside Jokatte railway station which houses two Vrundavana's of Shri Vidyamurthi Teertharu 27th swamiji and Shri Vidya vallabha Theertaru 28th swamiji (yatigalu) in the lineage of Krishnapur matha.

The union budget of 2024 has allocated Rupees fifty crores for doubling of railway tracks including signalling and telecommunications between Jokatte and Thokur railway station which are 1.98 kilometre apart. Thokur railway station is the southern most railway station under of Konkan Railway Corporation.
