= Kumta railway station =

Railway station in Karnataka, India

General information
- Coordinates: 14.4372°N 74.4211°E
- Owner: Indian Railways
- Line: Konkan Railway
- Platforms: 2
- Tracks: 3

Other information
- Status: Active
- Station code: KT

Services
Preceding station	Indian Railways	Following station
Gokarna Road towards Roha	Konkan Railway Konkan Railway	Honnavar towards Thokur
Route map
Location
- Location within Karnataka

Kumta railway station is a station on Konkan Railway. It is at a distance of 556.032 km (345.5 mi) down from origin. The preceding station on the line is Gokarna Road railway station and the next station is Honnavar railway station.
