= Pernem–Karwar Suburban Railway =

Pernem–Karwar Suburban Railway is a suburban railway which is operational under the Konkan Railways of Indian Railways. It serves the area around Goa and parts of Karnataka (Karwar alone). The DMU, EMU and MEMU trains are operated as local train in this suburban railway. It started operations in 2015 and the first train was "flagged off" by India's Railway Minister, Suresh Prabhu.

== Time and distance of station of train ==
Time for departure and reach
No	Station name	Distance	Departure time
1	PERNEM	0.00 km	9:30 am
2	THIVIM	10.9 km	9:43 am
3	KARMALI	28.4 km	10:01 am
4	VERNA	44.5 km	10:31 am
5	MAJORDA	49.5 km	10:41 am
6	SURAVALI	52.5 km	10:47 am
7	MADGAON	57.0 km	11:27 am
8	BALLI	73.4 km	11:46 am
9	CANCONA	90 km	12:08 pm
10	LOLIEM	99.9 km	12:22 pm
11	ASNOTI	109.5 km	12:32 pm
12	KARWAR	117.2 km	1:20 pm
