= Thivim railway station =

Railway station in Goa, India

Thivim Railway Station
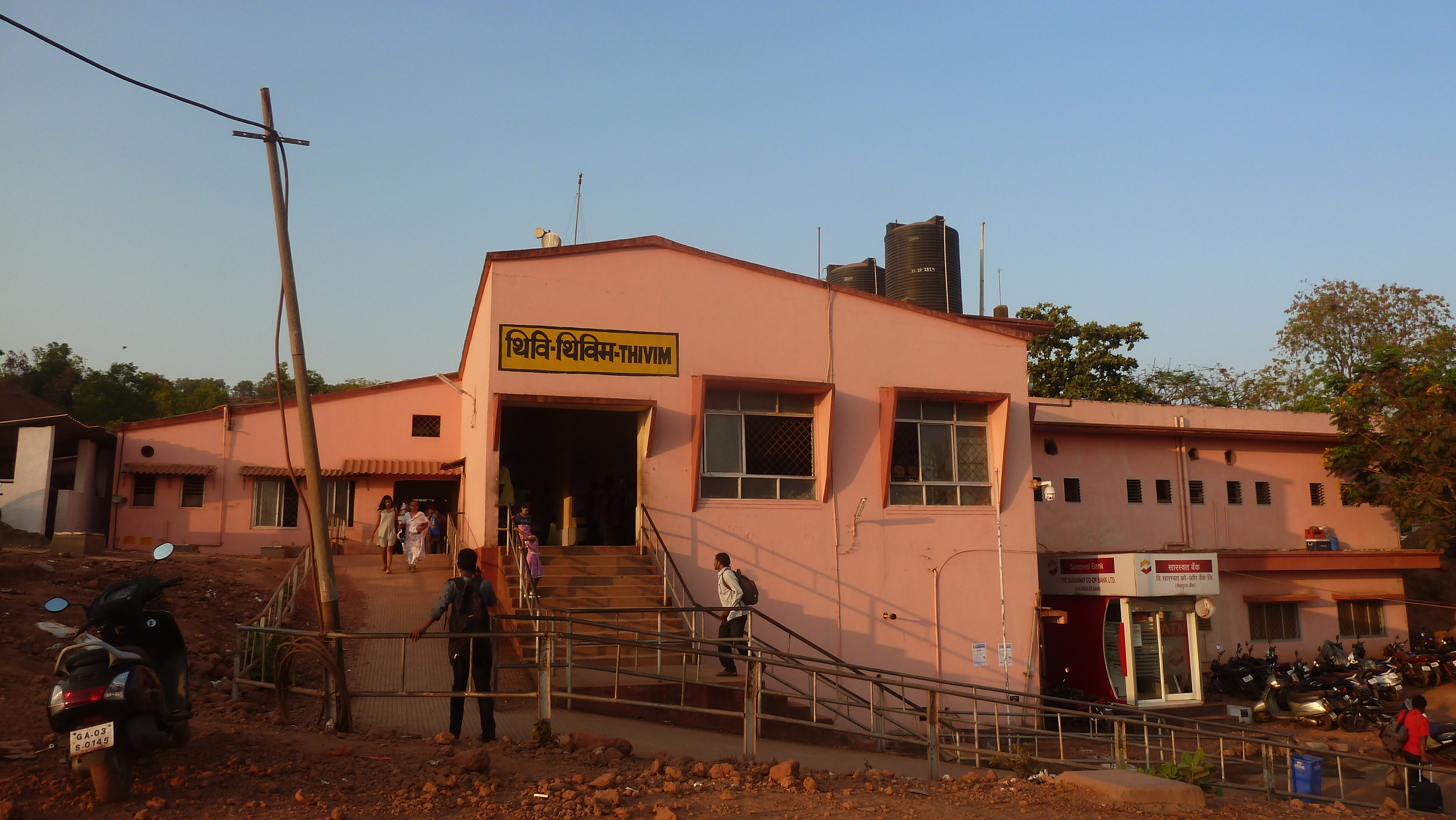
- View of the station

General information
- Location: SH-1 (Mapusa–Bicholim road), Sircaim Bardez, North Goa, Goa; India
- Coordinates: 15.6307°N 73.8769°E
- Elevation: 23 metres (75 ft)
- System: Regional rail and Light rail station
- Owner: Indian Railways
- Operator: Konkan Railway
- Line: Konkan Railway
- Platforms: 2
- Tracks: 4

Construction
- Structure type: Standard (on ground station)
- Accessible: Yes

Other information
- Status: Functioning
- Station code: THVM
- Zone(s): Konkan Railway
- Division(s): Karwar
- Fare zone: Indian Railways

History
- Opened: 1997; 29 years ago

Services
Preceding station	Indian Railways	Following station
Pernem towards Roha	Konkan Railway Konkan Railway	Karmali towards Thokur
Route map
Location
- Location within India Location within Goa

Thivim railway station (Station code: THVM) is one of the main railway stations for North Goa at Sircaim (also called Sirsaim). It is part of the North South line and almost every train serves this station.

== History ==
Tivim came on the rail route of India, after the building of the Konkan Railway in the 1990s. It connects Maharashtra and Karnataka.

== Location ==
It is located just off the Mapusa–Bicholim road at Sircaim, Bardez, North Goa 403502, Goa.

This station lies at an elevation of 23 m above sea level, and is part of the Konkan Railway/Konkan zone, in the division of Karwar.

== Infrastructure ==
The station comprises a single diesel BG (broad-gauge) track. It is a regular station, with two platforms. It has some 38 halting trains, with no originating or terminating trains from the station.

== Services available ==
The Tivim/Thivim station offers the Shravan Seva, a service to help senior citizens in carrying their luggage. This is available by sending an SMS on 96640 44456 four hours in advance of the journey, with details of the PNR number, coach number and berth number of the travelling citizen (as of August 2016).
