= George Fernandes Institute of Tunnel Technology =

Tunnelling training institute in Goa, India

The George Fernandes Institute of Tunnel Technology (GFITT) is a training institute in Margao, Goa, established by the Konkan Railway Corporation Limited (KRCL) for the assimilation and dissemination of knowledge in the field of tunnelling. The foundation stone was laid during KRCL's silver jubilee celebrations. Named after former Railway Minister George Fernandes, the institute focuses on training personnel working on Konkan Railway projects.

Railway Minister Suresh Prabhu and the Swiss Ambassador to India signed a memorandum of understanding to assist KRCL in establishing the institute.
