= Karmali railway station =

Railway station in Goa, India

Karmali
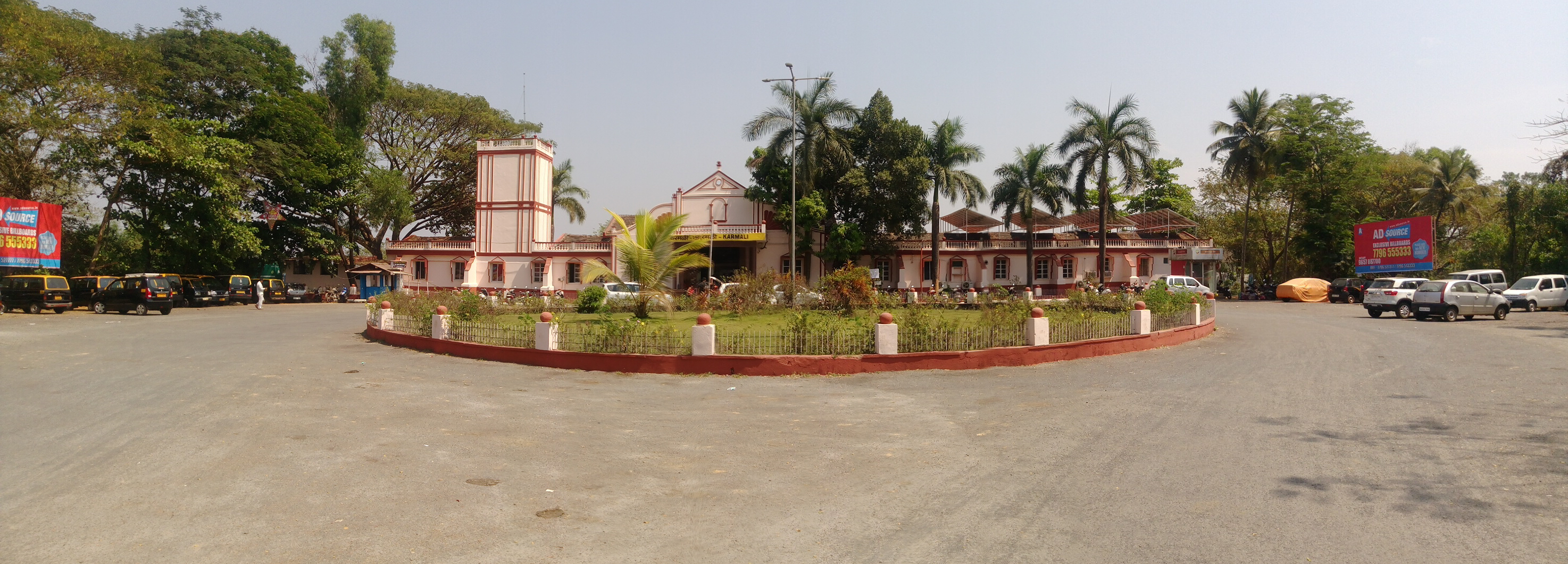

General information
- Location: Karmali, Tal. Tiswadi, North Goa, Goa; India
- Coordinates: 15.4907°N 73.9245°E
- Elevation: 7.354 metres (24.13 ft)
- System: Express train and Passenger train station
- Owner: Indian Railways
- Operator: Konkan Railway
- Line: Konkan Railway
- Platforms: 2
- Tracks: 4

Construction
- Structure type: Standard (on-ground station)
- Accessible: Yes

Other information
- Status: Functioning
- Station code: KRMI
- Zone(s): Konkan Railway
- Division(s): Karwar
- Fare zone: Indian Railways

History
- Opened: 24 August 1997; 29 years ago

Services
Preceding station	Indian Railways	Following station
Thivim towards Roha	Konkan Railway Konkan Railway	Verna towards Thokur
Route map
Location
- Location within Goa

Karmali railway station (station code: KRMI) is the third station (after Pernem and Tivim) within Goa, when entering from the north, under the jurisdiction of Konkan Railway. Karmali railway station is closest railway station to the State capital Panjim or Panaji, which is the administrative capital of Goa, and is located in the central part of Goa also can enjoy Scenic view of Carmbolim lake.

== Major trains ==
The train which originates from Karmali are :

● Lokmanya Tilak Terminus–Karmali AC Superfast Express (22115/22116)

== Administration ==
It falls under Karwar railway division of Konkan Railway zone, a subsidiary zone of Indian Railways.

== Amenities ==
In February 2016, The Times of India newspaper suggested that there had been a "Lack of basic amenities for commuters at Karmali station". Issues raised about the functioning of Karmali included unpunctual trains, discontinuation of the Jan Shatabdi Express and poor conditions.

== Gallery ==
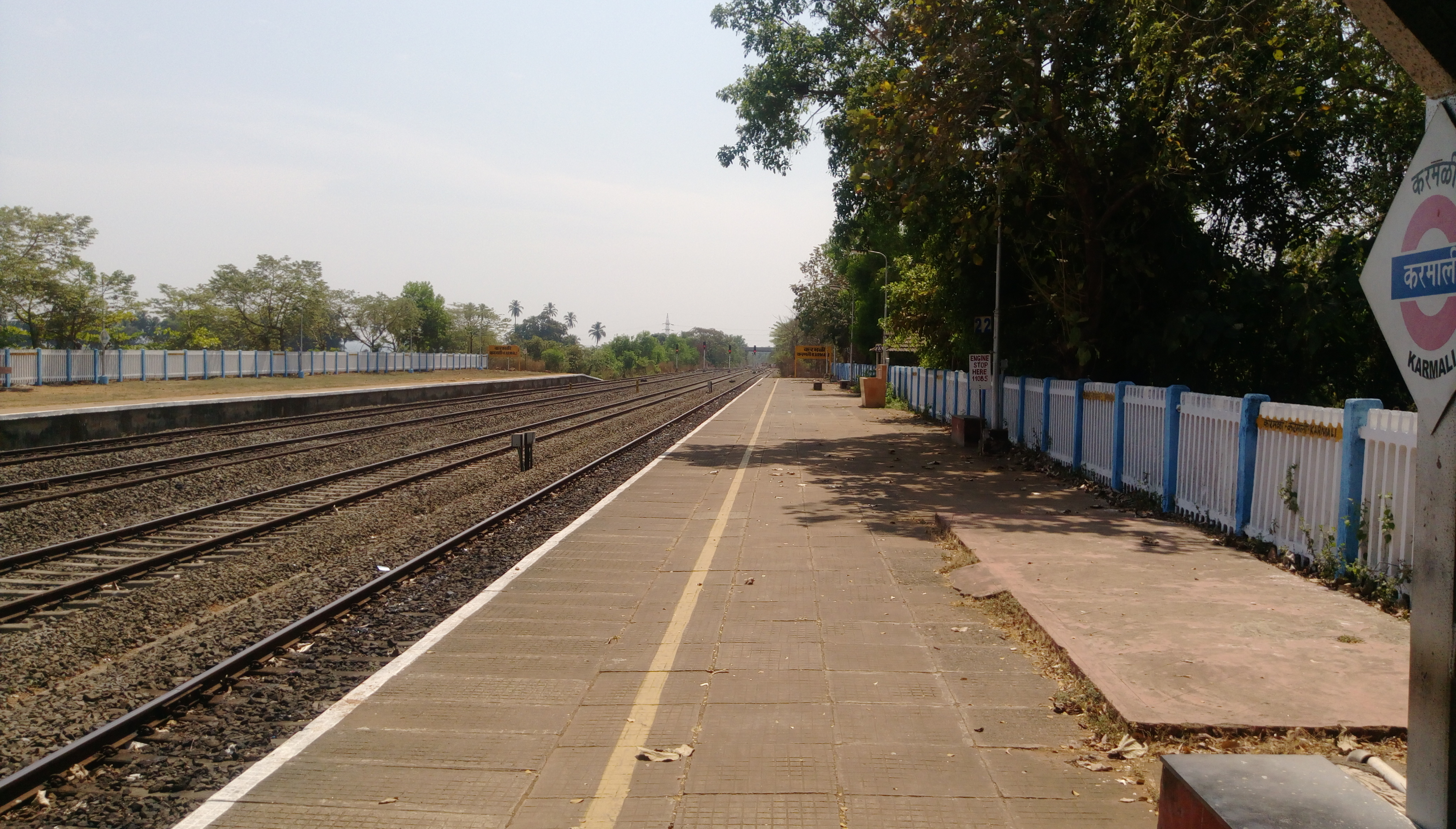
Platform view

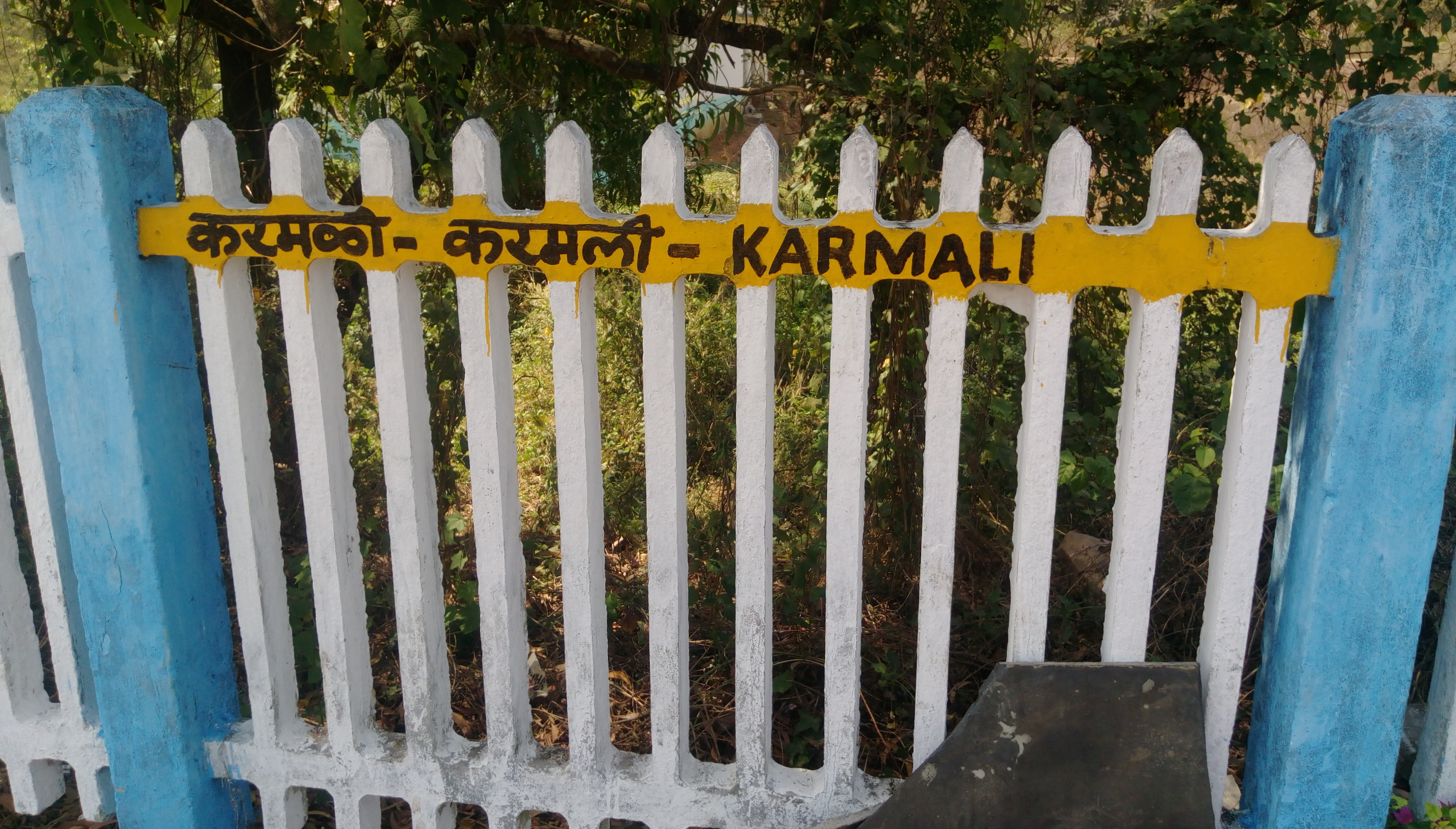
Fence

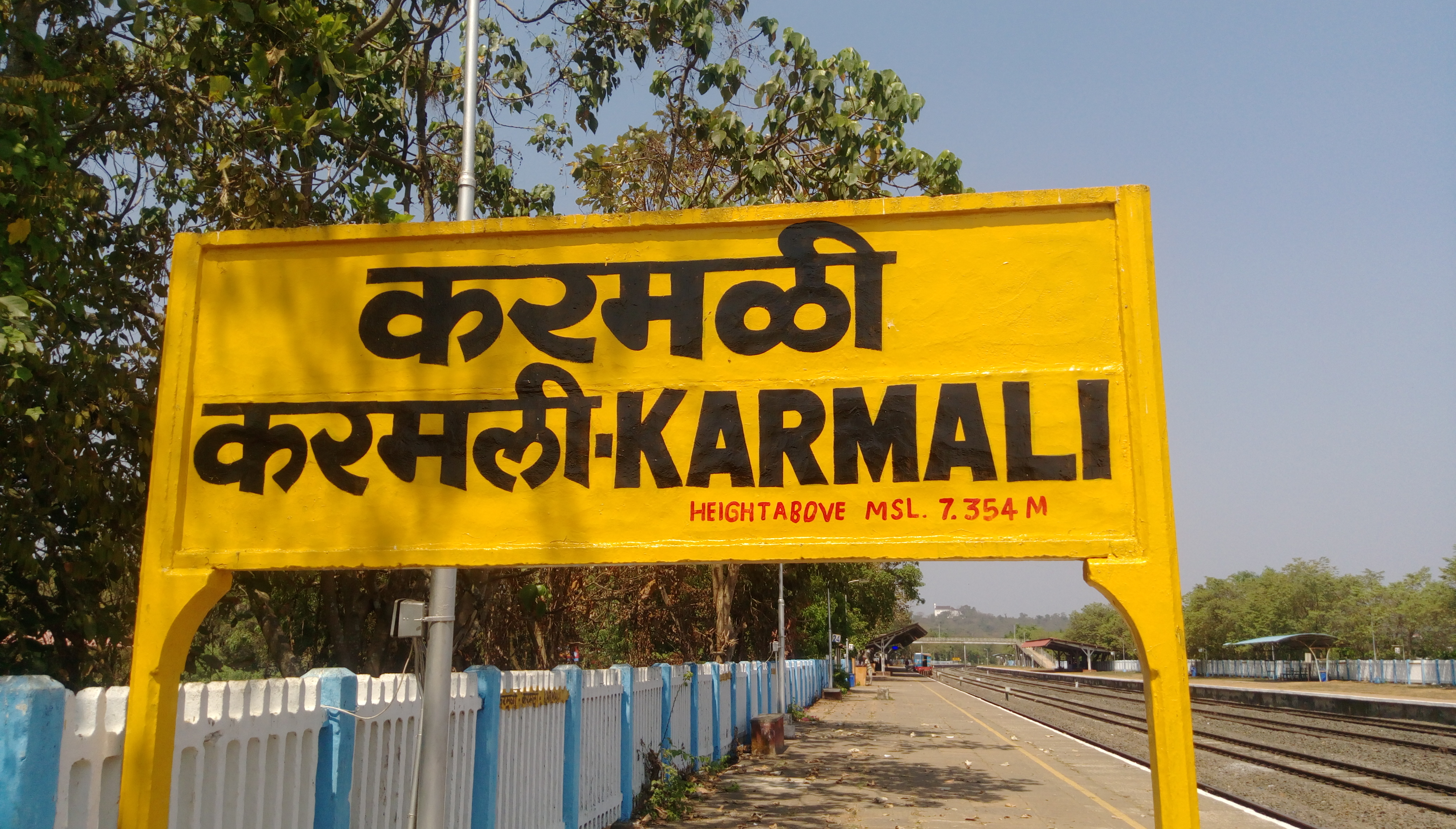
Station board

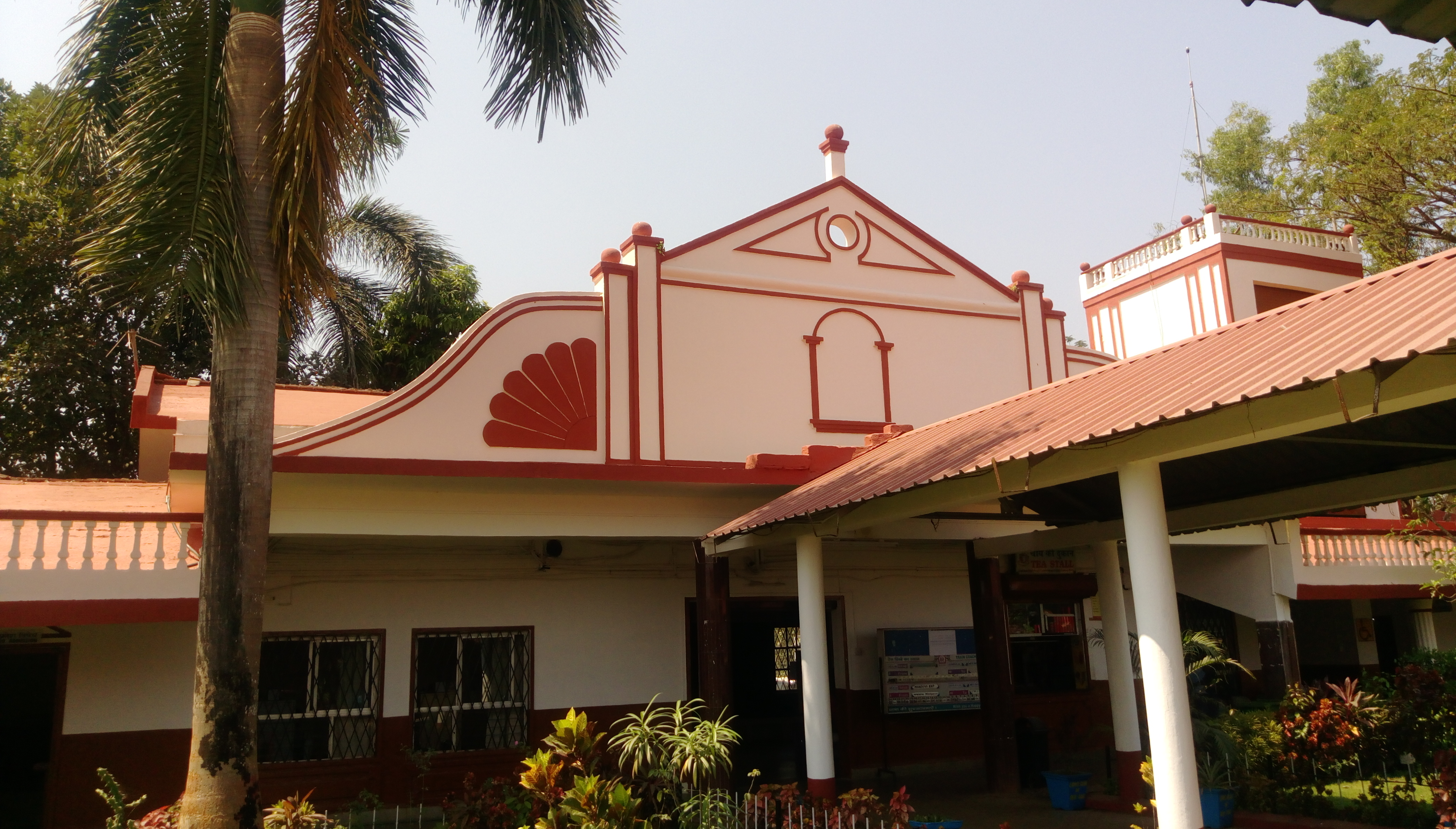
Interior view of station building

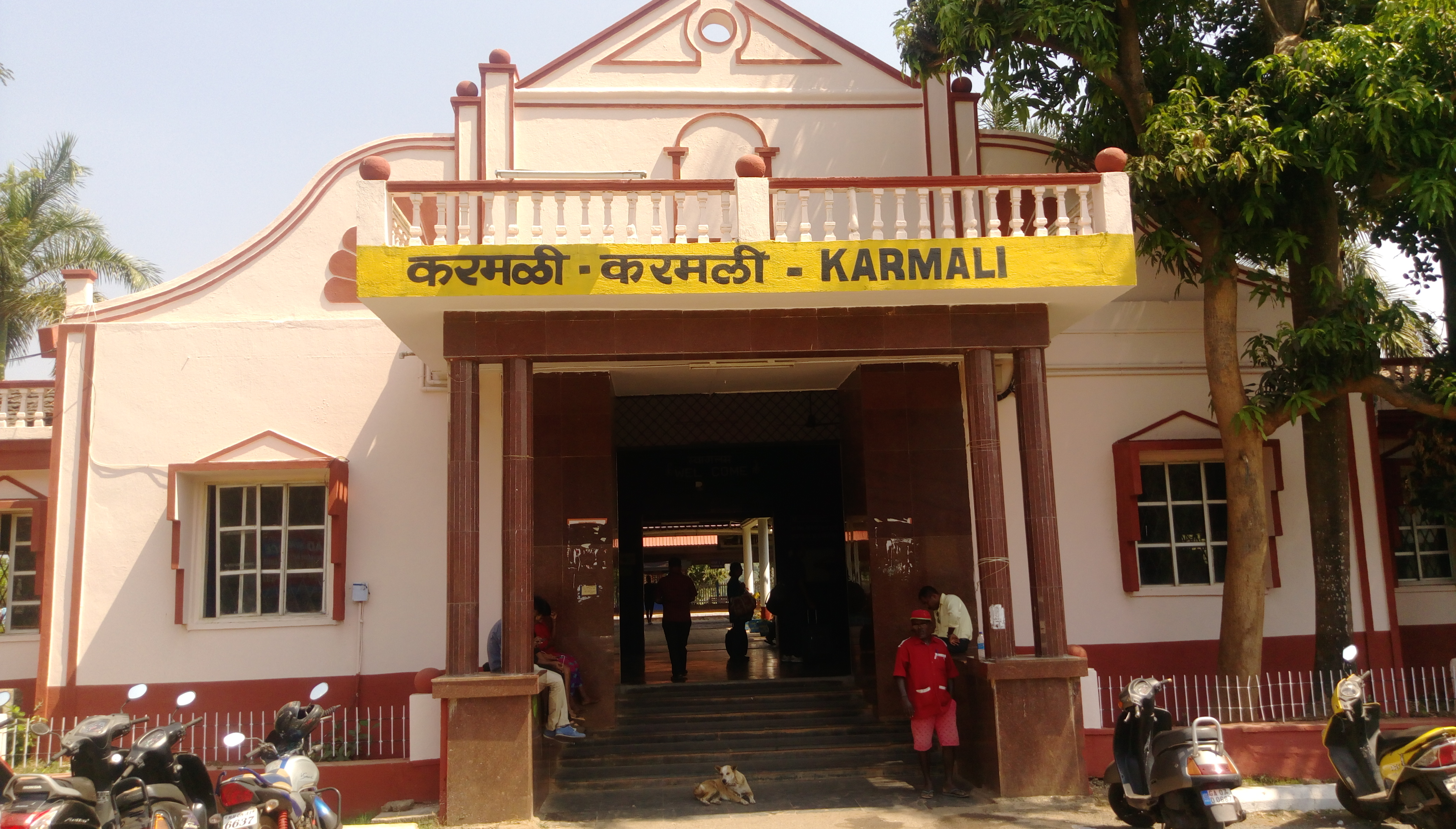
Main entrance of station building

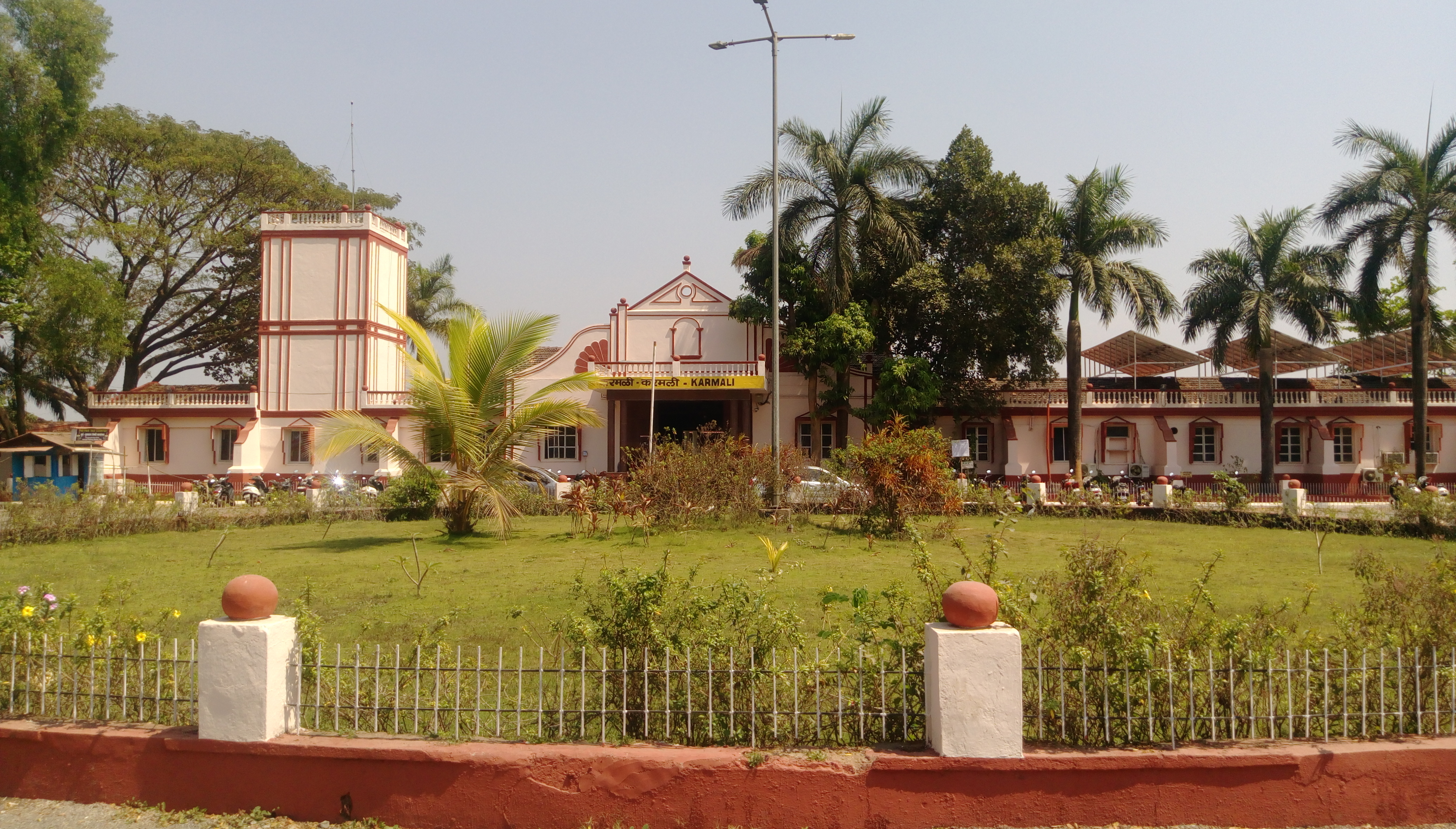
Exterior view of station building

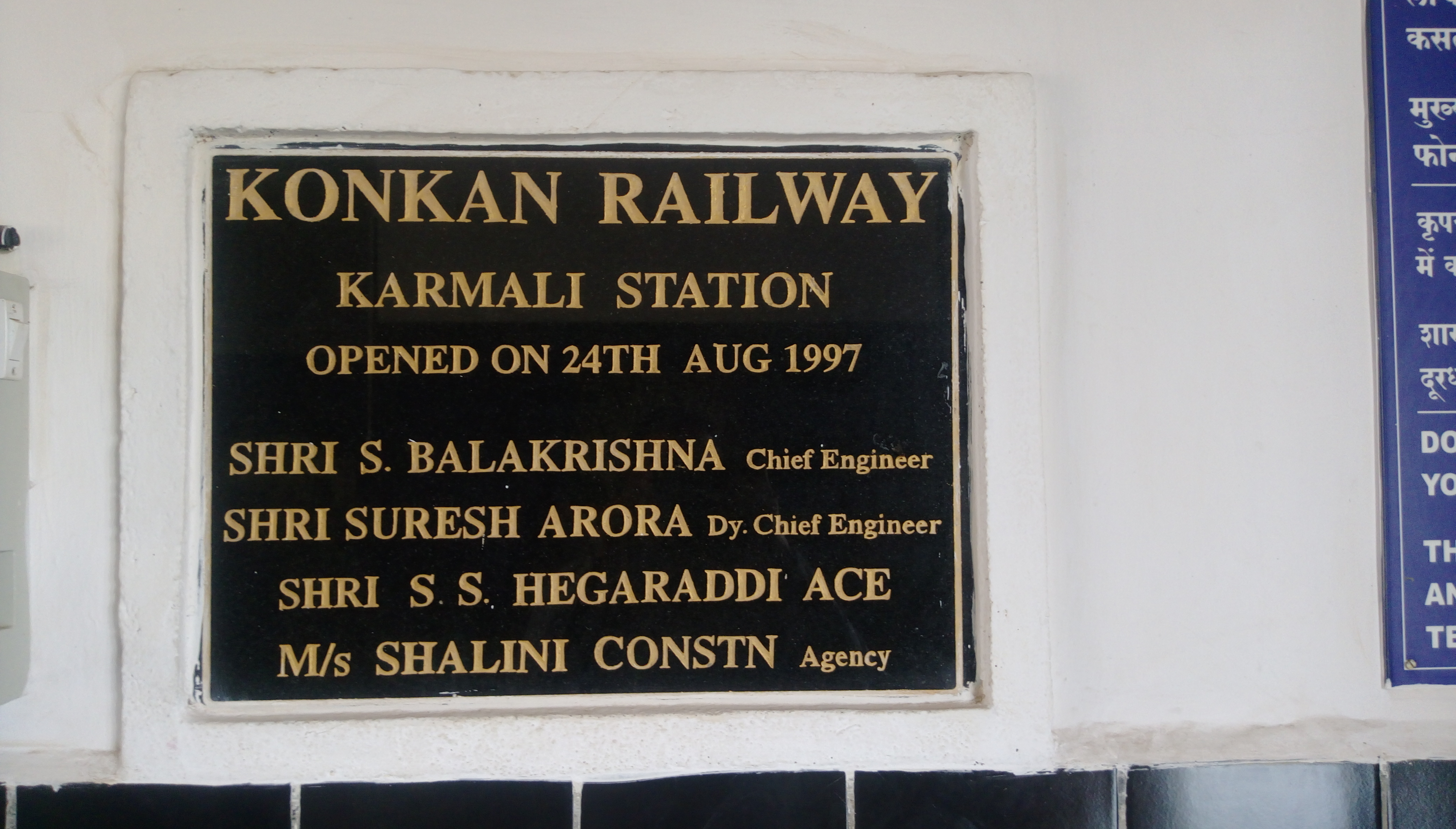
Inauguration plaque

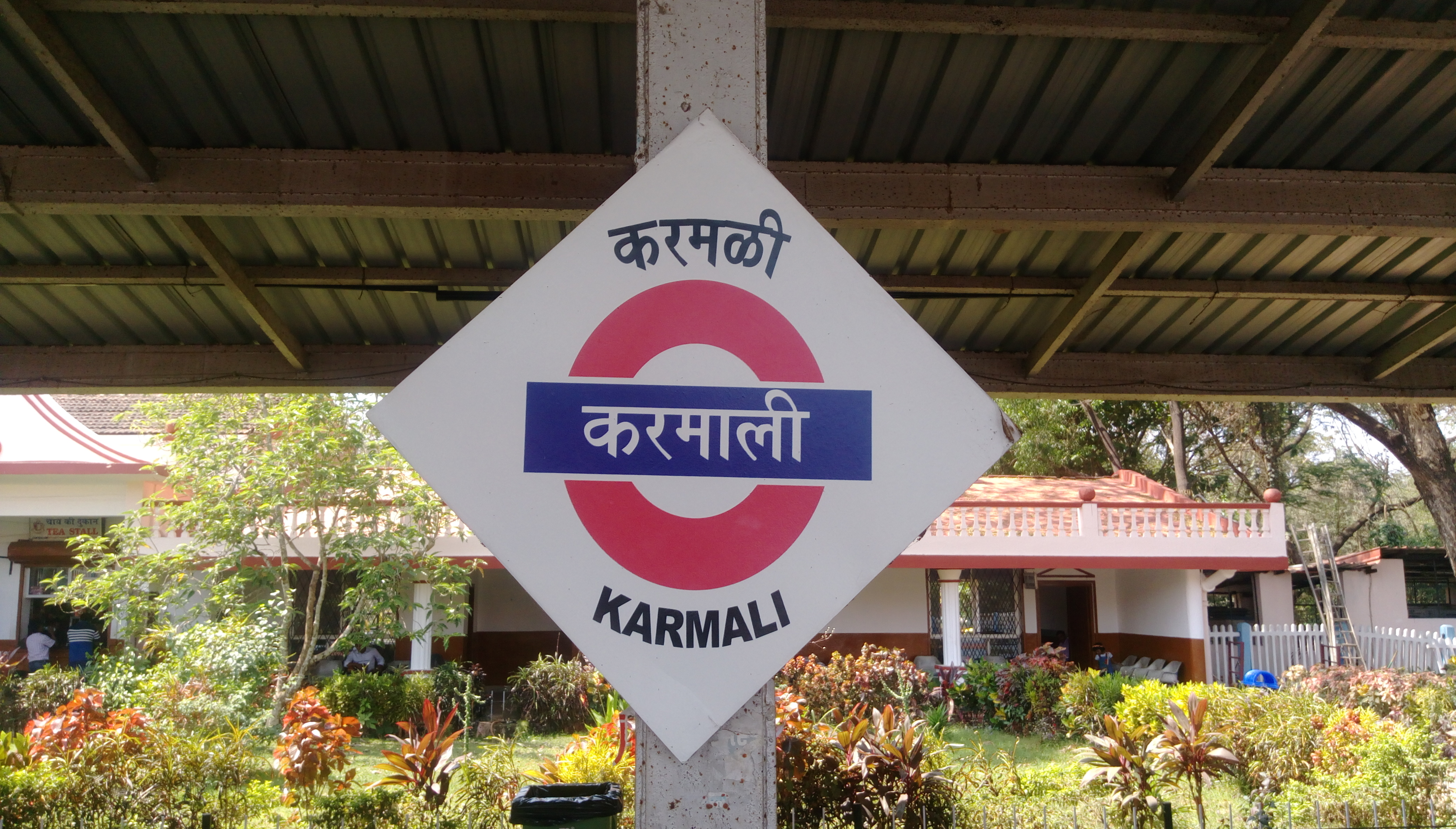
Platform board

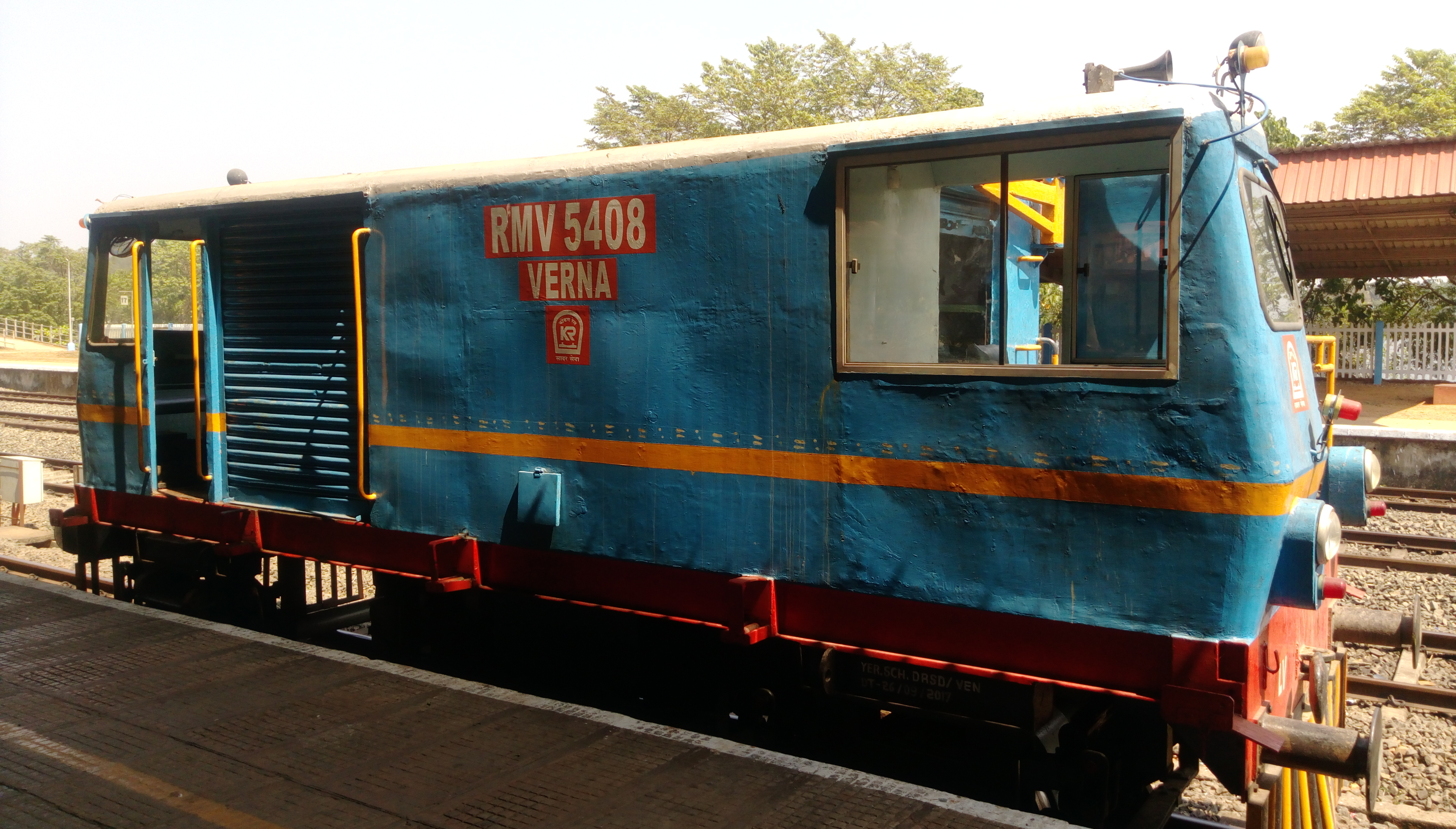
Inspection car at Karmali Station
