= India–Nepal Railway Connectivity Project =

Developmental project for India and Nepal

India Nepal Connectivity Project
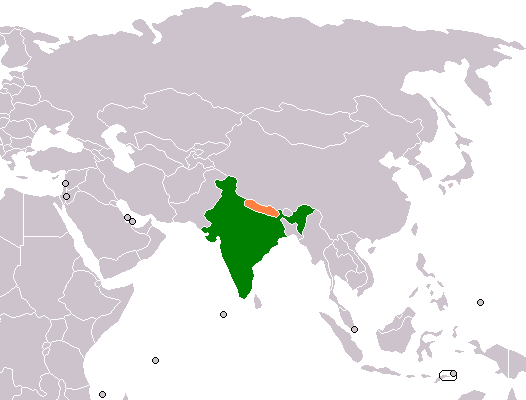
- India: Nepal

India-Nepal Railway Connectivity Project
- Mission statement: "To develop better connectivity for both the countries by rail"
- Type of project: Rail transport
- Owner: Government of India Government of Nepal
- Founder: India and Nepal
- Country: India; Nepal
- Ministry: Ministry of External Affairs
- Key people: India: Narendra Modi (Prime Minister); Ashwini Vaishnaw (Minister of Railways); S. Jaishankar (Minister of Foreign Affairs); Nepal: K. P. Sharma Oli (Prime Minister); Devendra Dahal (Minister of Physical Infrastructure and Transport)
- Established: 2017; 9 years ago
- Status: Active
- Website: www.mea.gov.in www.mea.gov.np

The India-Nepal Railway Connectivity Project is a collaborative initiative between India and Nepal aimed at enhancing rail connectivity between the two neighboring countries. The project is designed to facilitate trade, tourism, and regional integration by improving cross-border transportation infrastructure. Several railway links are planned or under development under this initiative, including the Jaynagar–Bardibas Railway, Raxaul–Kathmandu Railway, Jogbani–Biratnagar Railway, and New Jalpaiguri–Kakarbhitta Railway.

The Indian Government is playing a major role in funding and executing these projects, primarily through IRCON International, a wholly-owned subsidiary of Indian Railways. Nepal's railway operations are overseen by the Nepal Railway Company.Konkan Railway has supplied two Diesel Electric Multiple Unit (DEMU ) trains to Nepal to run between Jaynagar (Jainagar), Bihar to Kurtha near Janakpur, Nepal.

== Background ==
Historically, India and Nepal shared multiple railway links under the India Nepal Friendship Treaty, some operational since the early 20th century. However, many of these routes became inactive over time. In recent years, both governments have prioritized the revival and expansion of cross-border railways to enhance economic and social ties. However, after India's independence and Nepal's transition from monarchy to democracy, several of these routes became inactive or discontinued due to infrastructure decay and policy changes.

Recognizing the importance of modernizing rail connectivity, India and Nepal signed a memorandum of understanding in 2018 to revive and expand cross-border railway links.

== Key Railway Projects ==
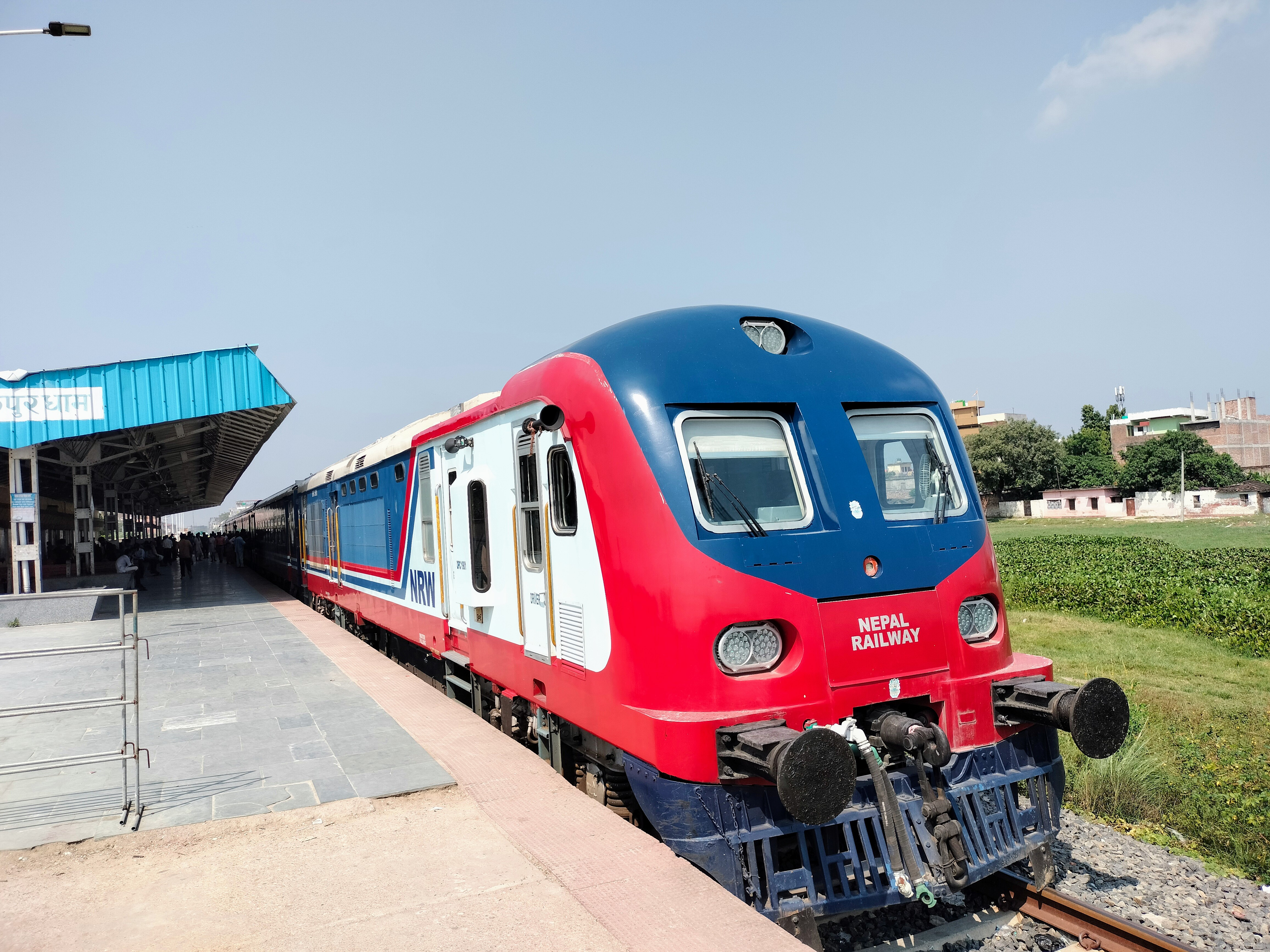
Nepali train standing on Janakpuri railway station part of Jaynagar–Bardibas railway line.

=== Jaynagar–Bardibas railway line ===
The Jaynagar–Bardibas railway is a key railway link connecting Jaynagar in Bihar, India, to Bardibas in Nepal.

Stations between Jaynagar to Bijalpura:

- Jaynagar (India)
- Inarwan (Nepal)
- Khajuri (Halt)
- Baidehi
- Parbaha
- Janakpurdham
- Kurtha
- Khutta Pipradhi
- Loharpatti
- Singyahi
- Bhangaha (formerly Bijalpura)

The project is being developed in multiple phases:

- Phase 1 (Jaynagar–Kurtha, 34 km) was inaugurated in 2022
- Phase 2 (Kurtha–Bijalpura, 17 km) is under development
- Phase 3 (Bijalpura–Bardibas, 17 km) is planned for future expansion

=== Raxaul–Kathmandu railway line ===
The Raxaul–Kathmandu railway is a proposed cross-border rail project connecting Raxaul (Bihar, India) with Kathmandu (Nepal). India and Nepal signed a Memorandum of Understanding (MoU) in 2018 for feasibility studies, with the project expected to significantly reduce travel time between the two cities.

=== Jogbani–Biratnagar railway line ===
The Jogbani–Biratnagar railway line is another key railway link aimed at boosting trade and passenger connectivity.

- Phase 1 (8 km from Jogbani to Biratnagar) is under construction
- Phase 2 (further expansion towards Nepal's interior regions) is planned

=== New Jalpaiguri–Kakarbhitta railway line ===
The New Jalpaiguri–Kakarbhitta railway line is a proposed railway project to link New Jalpaiguri (West Bengal, India) with Kakarbhitta (Nepal). It aims to enhance connectivity between eastern Nepal and India's northeastern states.

== Strategic importance ==
Since, Nepal's largest trade partner is India, the India Nepal Railways Connectivity Project will:

- Strengthen economic ties by facilitating trade and transportation.
- Improve tourism by making travel between India and Nepal more convenient.
- Enhance regional integration by connecting Nepal with India's broader railway network.

== See also ==
- Jaynagar Junction railway station
