= Karwar railway division =

Karwar railway division is one of the two railway divisions under Konkan Railway of Indian Railways. This railway division was formed on 26 January 1998 and its headquarter is located at Karwar in the state of Karnataka of India.

Karwar railway division extends over 395 km (245 mi) from Pernem in Goa to Thokur near Surathkal in Karnataka. Railway Regions are headed by a Regional Railway Manager.
