= Thokur railway station =

Railway station in Karnataka, India

Thokur

General information
- Coordinates: 12.9633544°N 74.8272132°E
- System: Indian Railways station
- Owner: Konkan Railway
- Line: Konkan Railway

Construction
- Accessible: Disabled access

Other information
- Status: Active
- Station code: TOK
- Zone(s): Konkan Railways
- Division(s): Karwar
- Fare zone: KAWR

Services
Preceding station	Indian Railways	Following station
Surathkal towards Roha	Konkan Railway Konkan Railway	Terminus
Terminus	South Western Railway zone Shoranur–Mangalore west	Mangalore Junction towards ?
Route map
Location
- Location within India Location within Karnataka

Thokur railway station is the southern most station under the jurisdiction of Konkan Railway Corporation Limited towards Mangalore. Thokur railway station is located in Mangalore taluk of Dakshina Kannada district of Karnataka state, India.Konkan Railway Corporation Limited ( KRCL )in coordination with Western railway zone has arranged to run special trains (09303/09304) from Dr Ambedkar nagar (Mhow) to Thokur via Indore junction, Vasai Road, Panvel, Ankola and Surathkal on 21st and 28 December 2025 (from Indore to Thokur) and 23rdand 30 December 2025 (from Thokur to Indore).

After Thokur railway station, railway tracks which goes southwards to Jokatte railway station is under operational and maintenance command of South Western Railway (SWR) zone of Indian Railways.
