= Konkan Railway zone =

Railway in Maharashtra, India

Overview
- Operator: Konkan Railway Corporation
- Stations called at: 72
- Locale: Konkan, India

Technical
- Track gauge: 1,676 mm (5 ft 6 in)
- Electrification: Yes
- Length: 756.25 km (469.91 mi)
- Operating speed: 120 km/h (75 mph)

Other
- Website: konkanrailway.com

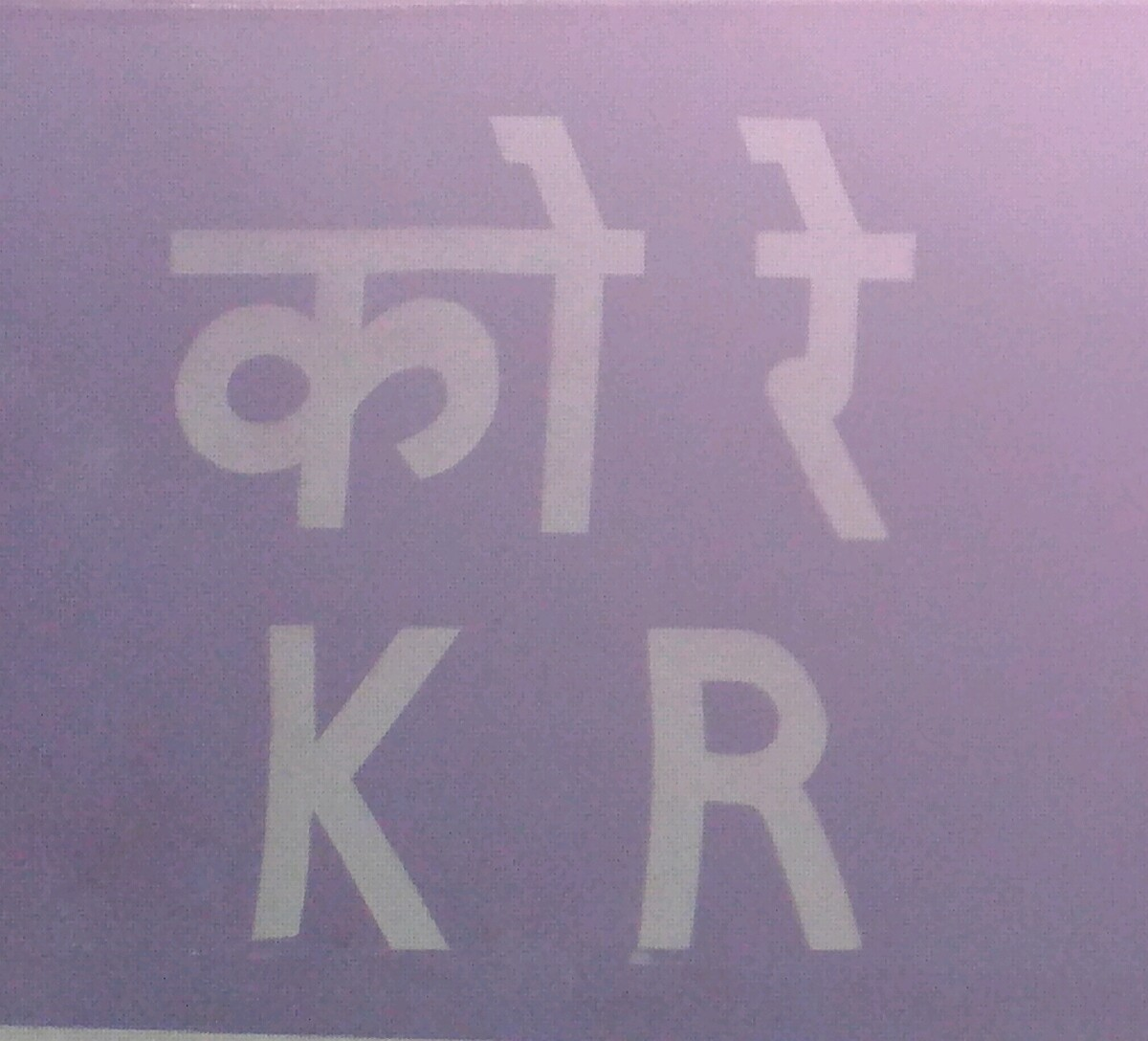
Bilingual Konkan Railway Zone initials

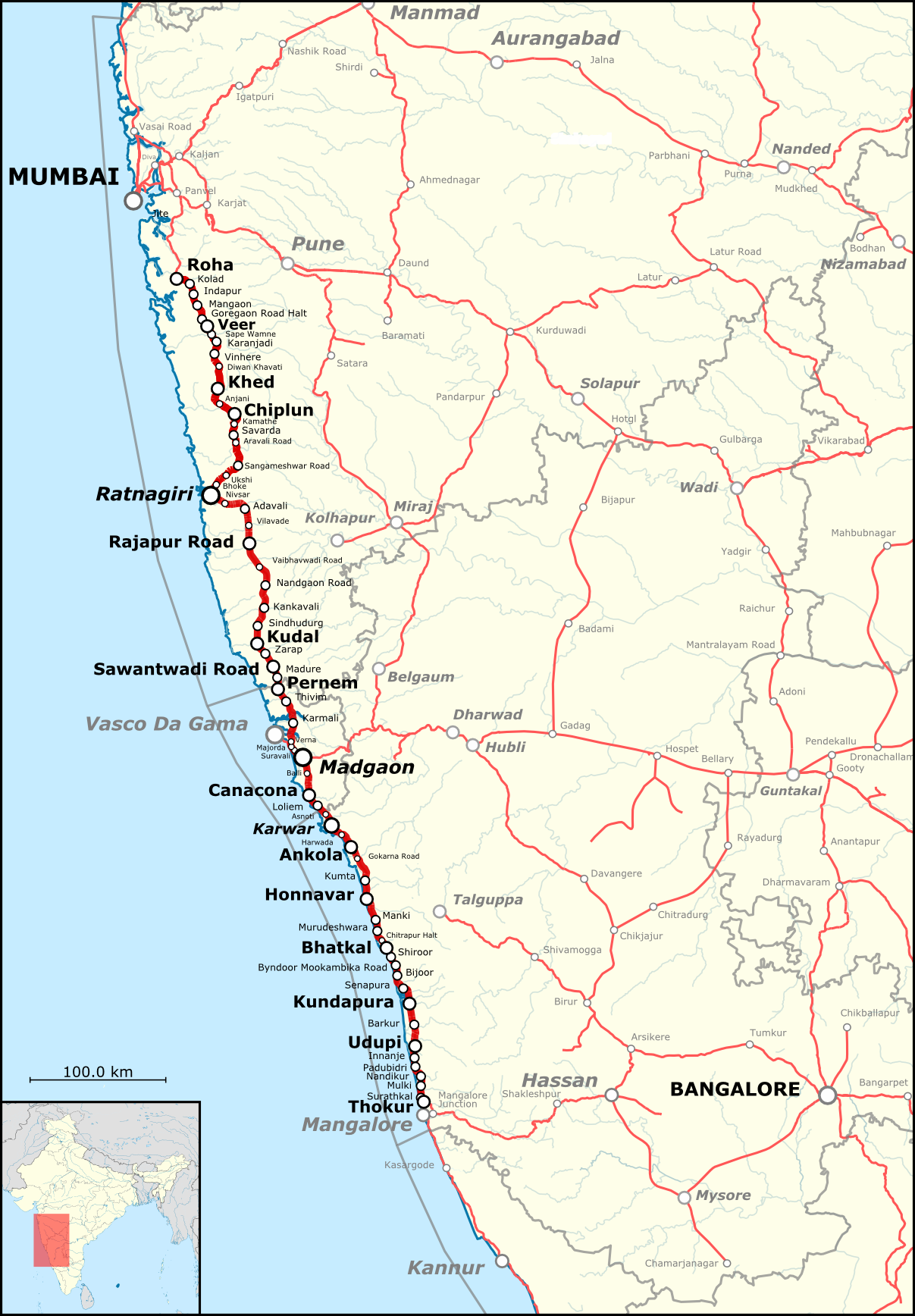
Route map

Indian Railways zone map; 17 is Konkan Railway

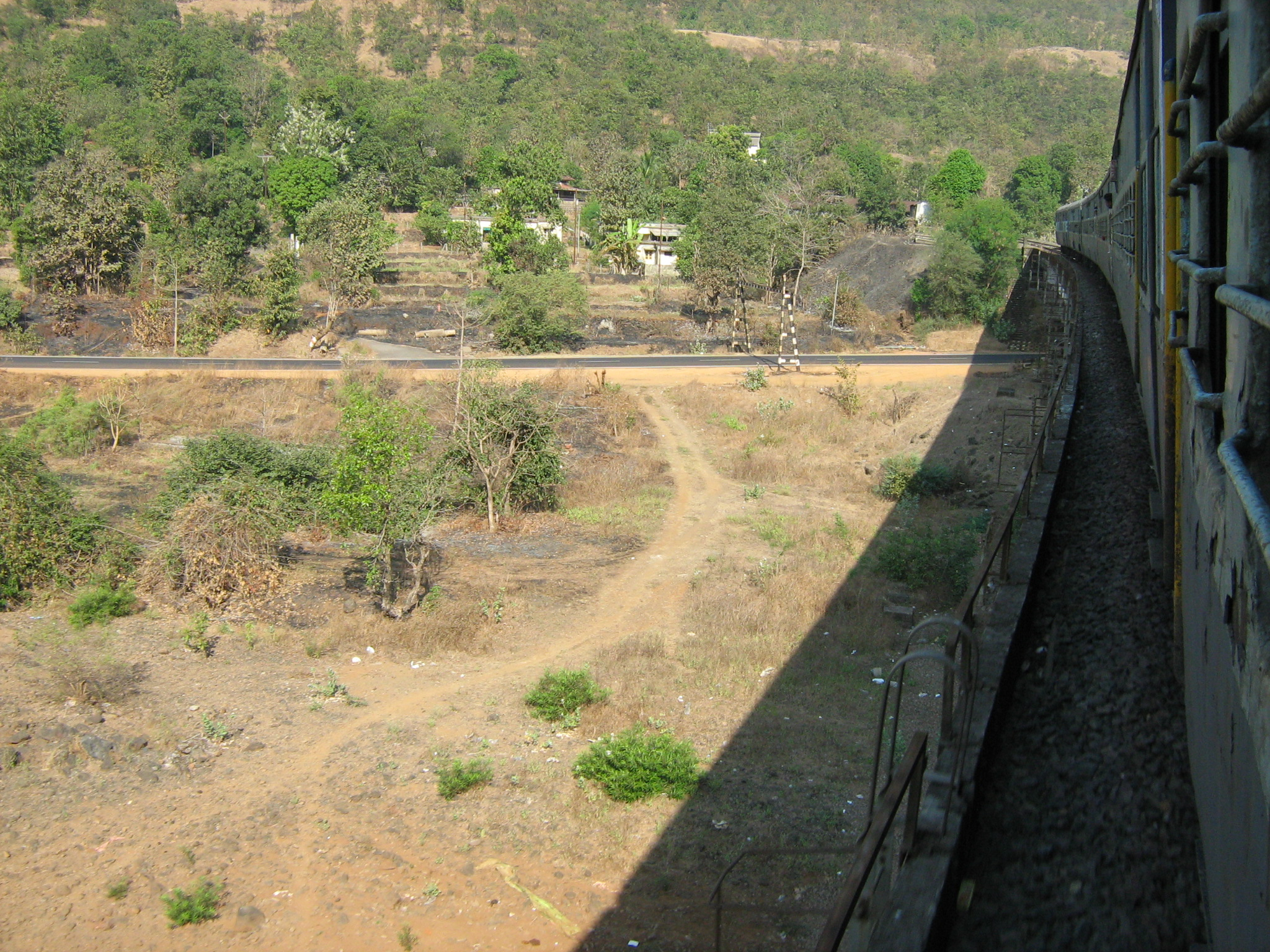
Express train in Konkan near Diwan Khavati Railway Station

The Konkan Railway (abbreviated KR) is one of the 19 railway zones in India with its headquarters at CBD Belapur in Navi Mumbai, Maharashtra, India. The Konkan Railway line from Roha to Thokur is operated and maintained by Konkan Railway Corporation Limited(KRCL). The first passenger train ran on Konkan railway tracks on 20 March 1993, between Udupi and Mangalore. During its initial years of operation in the mountainous Konkan region, a number of accidents prompted Konkan Railway to implement new technology. Anti-collision devices, the Sky Bus and roll-on/roll-off are several of the railway's innovations. The 756.25 km (469.91 mi) long railway line connects the states of Maharashtra, Goa and Karnataka. The first train on the completed track was sent off on 26 January 1998.

== History ==
=== Background ===
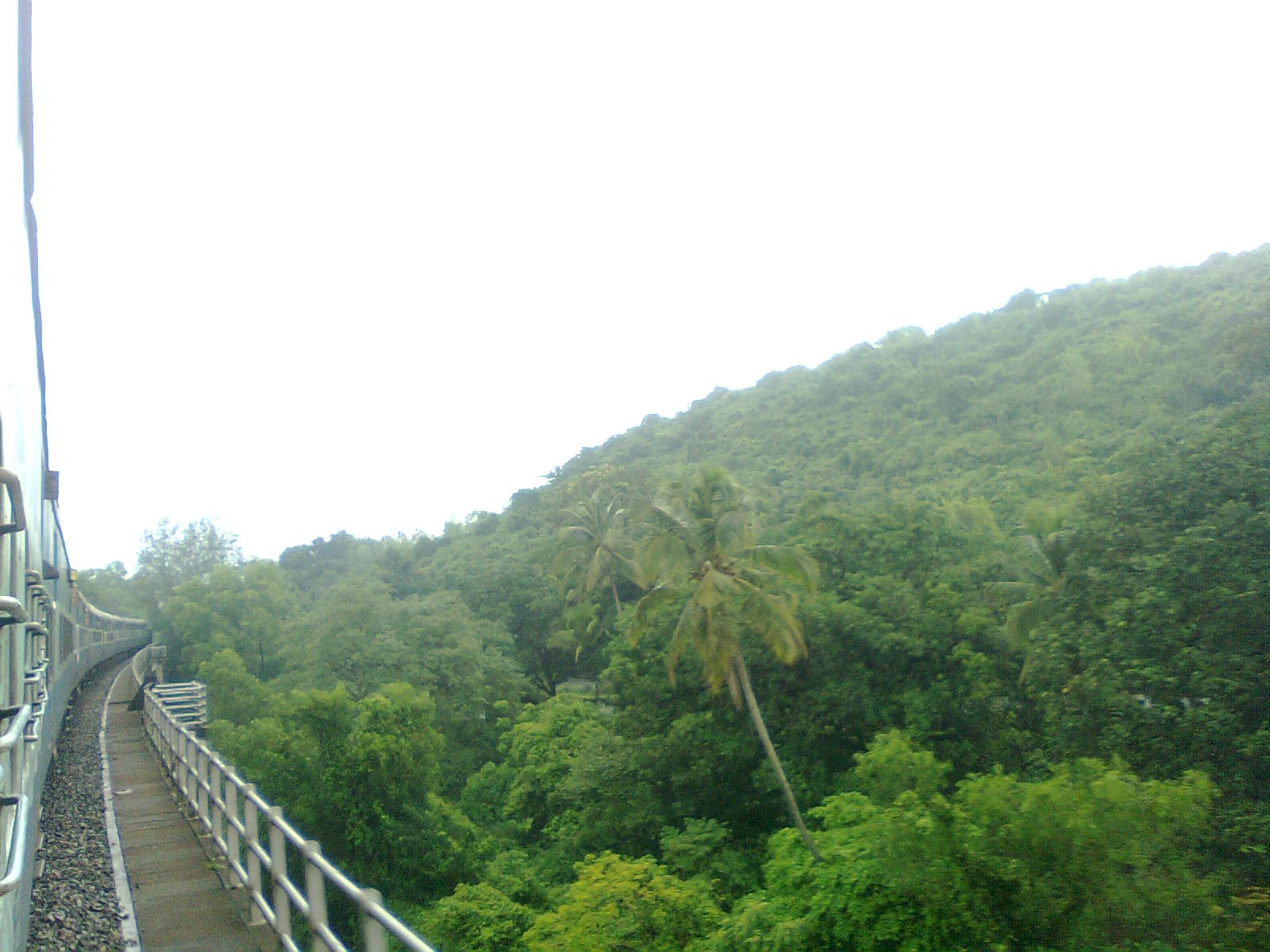
Crossing a long bridge between two hills

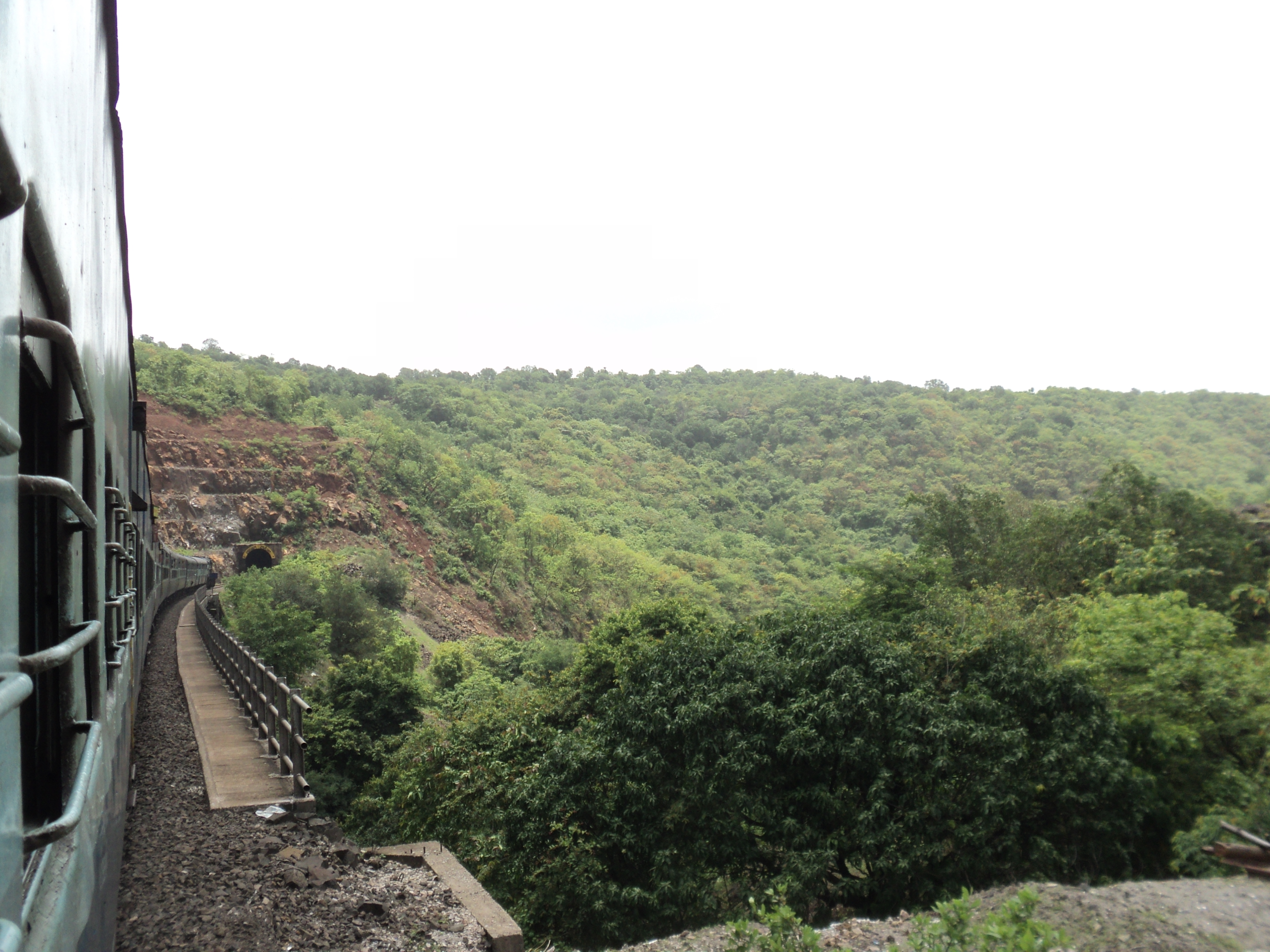
Entering the Chiplun railway tunnel

For most of the modern era, the Konkan coast of India did not have a railway link connecting its coastal cities, towns and villages. Even the British who ruled India until 1947 did not build a railway along this route. The first proposal was surveyed in 1920. In 1957 an aerial survey was conducted of the area between Dasgaon, Raigad District in Maharashtra and Mangalore with the object of studying the possibilities of railway development in this region.

The long-pending demand of this region was fulfilled by George Fernandes who was the Railway minister in V.P. Singh's government, backed by then Finance minister Madhu Dandavate and Vice Chairman of Planning Commission Ramakrishna Hegde. They set up Konkan Railway Corporation Limited headed by E.Sreedharan for executing Konkan railway line to tide over funds crunch of Indian Railways.

The first phase of the Konkan Railway was the 60.75-kilometre (37.75 mi) section from Apta to Roha. It was cleared by the Planning Commission, and the project was included in the 1978-79 budget at an estimated cost of ₹11.19 billion. The length of the railway from Apta to Mangalore was estimated at 890 kilometres (550 mi), and its cost was estimated at ₹239 billion in 1976. The engineering and traffic survey for the West Coast Railway Line from Apta to Mangalore was conducted from 1970 to 1972. The final survey for the Apta-Roha-Dasgaon section was made in 1974–75.

=== Challenges ===
The project involved over 2,116 bridges (of which the Panvalnadi bridge was the highest viaduct in India till 2010, Now Jhajjhar Khad is the highest viaduct in India) and 92 tunnels and was the largest railway project of the century in Asia. A major challenge was land acquisition from about 43,000 landowners. When the Konkan Railway Corporation (KRCL) began asking people to surrender property which had belonged to them for generations, many (convinced of the project's importance) did so voluntarily. This enabled the process to be completed in one year. The longest bridge is on the River Sharavathi, spanning 2.06 km (1.28 mi) and the longest Tunnel is in Karbude near Ratnagiri, stretching 6.561 km (4.08 mi).

Terrain and the elements were challenging; flash floods, loose soil, landslides and tunnel collapses affected work at many places on the project. Thickly forested construction sites were often visited by wild animals.

The route crosses three states (Maharashtra, Goa and Karnataka), each of which agreed to provide financing. The authorised share capital was increased in 1996-1997 from ₹6 billion to ₹8 billion, with the government of India taking a 51-percent share; the rest went to Maharashtra (22 percent), Karnataka (15 percent), Kerala (6 percent) and Goa (6 percent).

Contracts for the project were given to construction firms which included Larsen & Toubro who were given a major part of the project, Gammon India and Afcons. To speed up construction, piers for major bridges were cast on riverbanks itself and launched with pontoon-mounted cranes. This was India's first use of incremental launch bridge-building. The greatest challenge was presented by the nine tunnels bored through soft soil, which required a slow, manual process. Excavation was difficult due to saturated clay and high water table. Tunnels collapsed immediately several times, requiring the work to be redone. Nineteen lives and four years were lost in the construction of the soft-soil tunnels alone, and a total of seventy-four people died during the railway's construction. The compensation is being paid to the persons displaced due to Konkan Railway Project. The amount paid up till now is approx. Rs. 103 crores to about 39000 persons.

=== Controversy ===
In Goa, which makes up 156.25 kilometres (97.09 mi) of the route, concerns were raised about the environmental and economic impact of the railway. According to opponents of the project, the coastal railway would destroy habitat, damage historical sites, and disrupt lives in the densely populated state. In 1991, the Konkan Railway Re-Alignment Committee (KRRAC) organised protests against the proposed railway line. The KRRAC's main points were that the proposal would flood coastal regions, destroy fertile land, harm the monuments of Old Goa, irreparably damage the marshes and mangrove swamps along the coast and the estuaries of the Mandovi and Zuari Rivers, and displace neighbourhoods along the coast. The committee proposed an alternative hinterland alignment passing through relatively unpopulated regions, which would extend the line by about 27.75 kilometres (17.24 mi) but reduce environmental damage.

But the hinterland alignment was rejected by the Konkan Railway Corporation because it would substantially lengthen & divert the line, deny rail access to Goa's population centers, and delay and increase the costs of construction. The KRRAC, which had become a political movement, filed public interest litigation in the Bombay High Court in March 1992 seeking an injunction on construction work and diversion of the line through the hinterland alignment. The high court dismissed the petition the following month, ruling that

... the claim of the petitioners that the alignment would have devastating and irreversible impact upon the khazan lands is without any foundation, and even otherwise, the extent of damage is extremely negligible and a public project of such a magnitude which is undertaken for meeting the aspirations of the people on the west coast cannot be defeated on such considerations. It is not open to frustrate the project of public importance to safeguard the interest of few persons. It cannot be overlooked that while examining the grievance about the adverse impact upon a small area of 30 hectares of Khazan lands, the benefit which will be derived by a large number of people by the construction of rail line cannot be brushed aside. The Courts are bound to take into consideration the comparative hardship which the people in the region will suffer by stalling the project of great public utility. The cost of the project escalates from day to day and, as pointed out by the Corporation, the extent of the interest and east which will be suffered by the Corporation every day is to the tune of Rs. 45 lakhs. No development is possible without some adverse effect on the ecology and environment ...

The Konkan Railway Re-Alignment Committee (KRRAC) now under new name Save Konkan Ecology Forum (SKEF) is strictly & violently opposing Doubling & Electrification Works of Konkan Railway Line, planned by Indian Railways in 2014/2015, citing concerns about the environmental and economic impact, destruction habitat, damage historical sites, and disrupt lives in the densely populated state. Maharashtra, Karnataka & Kerala Governments had given Green signal for doubling & electrification of Konkan Railway Line in 2015/2016.

=== Completion ===
In March 1993, the southern 46-kilometre (29 mi) between Thokur, 18-kilometre (11 mi) from Mangalore, and Udupi in Karnataka entered service, followed by the northern 47-kilometre (29 mi) section between Roha and Veer in Maharashtra in June of that year. The first passenger train on the route ran between Mangalore and Udupi on 20 March 1993. The service was extended by 52 kilometres (32 mi) from Veer to Khed in March 1995, and by a further 286 kilometres (178 mi) from Khed to Sawantwadi Road in December 1996. The Southern service was extended by 38 kilometres (24 mi) from Udupi to Kundapur in January 1995, and by a further 272 kilometres (169 mi) to Pernem in Goa in August 1997.

Through services between Mumbai and Mangalore remained on hold due to a problematic tunnel at Pernem, which experienced repeated cave-ins and flooding. The tunnel was finally completed in January 1998, six years after its construction began. Through services on the line began after the inauguration of the full 756.25-kilometre (469.91 mi) stretch from Roha to Mangalore on 26 January 1998. Passenger service on the full route, between Mumbai and Mangalore, began in May 1998.

Karwar railway station

== Improvements ==
=== Track doubling ===
According to a study by the railway, track doubling is possible on about 324-kilometre (201 mi) which runs on the plains. Several stretches on the 756.25-kilometre (469.91 mi) line can be converted to double track, such as the 47-kilometre (29 mi) line from Roha to Veer, which is now doubled. The 63-kilometre (39 mi) stretch between Udupi and Mangalore is another candidate. The 88-kilometre (55 mi) track from Vaibhavwadi Road to Madure is entirely flat terrain and can easily be converted into Double Track.

On 3 November 2015, Konkan Railway senior official Bhanu P. Tayal announced to the press that track-doubling and electrification would begin on 8 November in Kolad. Life Insurance Corporation offered a favourable ₹2.5 billion loan, and other funding would be available. The project, expected to cost ₹100 billion, was scheduled for completion by 2020. In October 2018, the railway announced that the 45-kilometre (28 mi) stretch between Roha and Veer would have two tracks by December 2019. Matsyagandha Express (Train number 02619 run as special) travelling from Lokmanya Tilak Terminus, Mumbai (LTT) to Mangaluru Central (MAQ) became the first train to take the Roha-Veer double line on Konkan railway route on 30 August 2021.

In 2025, Konkan Railway invited tenders for a feasibility study to investigate doubling of the Mookambika Road Byndoor–Thokur (112 km) and Vaibhavwadi Road–Majorda (151 km) sections, with costs of ₹1.31 crore for the study.

=== Electrification ===
The foundation stone laying for electrification of the Konkan railway line was done in November 2015. The entire 741 kilometer route stretching from Roha, Maharashtra to Thokur, Karnataka was electrified, finishing in March 2022. Inspection of the entire stretch was completed in six phases starting in March 2020. The last stretch between Ratnagiri and Thivim was inspected on March 24 and authorisation was obtained on 29 March.

=== New stations ===
The railway was scheduled to have new stations at Indapur, Goregaon Road, Sape Wamane, Kalambani Budruk, Kadavai, Veravali, Saundal, Kharepatan Road, Achirne, Mirjan and Innanje by December 2019. All of these stations are operational now.

== Operations ==
The 756.25-kilometre (469.91 mi) railway has a total track length of 900 kilometres (560 mi). Its length through Maharashtra is 361 kilometres (224 mi), through Karnataka 239 kilometres (149 mi), and 156.25 kilometres (97.09 mi) through Goa.

=== Passenger ===
The route is popular with passengers due to its connectivity with regions hitherto inaccessible by rail and the substantial time savings for travellers between western and southern India. Several trains which had taken circuitous routes ran on the Konkan Railway, reducing running time. The first of these was the Mumbai-Mangalore Netravati Express later extended to Trivandrum, which was diverted to the Konkan Railway on 1 March 1998; this was followed by the Thiruvananthapuram Rajdhani Express on 1 April of that year. The Matsyagandha Express, running from Lokmanya Tilak Terminus to Mangalore, began service on 1 May 1998. The Hazrat Nizamuddin-Mangalore Mangala Express was diverted to the route and extended to Ernakulam Junction on 1 August 1998. The Pune-Ernakulam Junction Express was introduced on 25 February 1999. The Marusagar Express, which runs between Jaipur and Ernakulam Junction and was extended to Ajmer via the Konkan Railway, began service on 12 October 2001. The Jan Shatabdi Express was flagged off between Mumbai and Madgaon (the longest-running Jan Shatabdi) on 16 April 2002 to commemorate Indian Railways' 150th anniversary. On 1 February 2008, a Garib Rath Express between the Thiruvananthapuram Central and Lokmanya Tilak Terminus began service.

The Tejas Express is the first semi-high-speed, fully air-conditioned train fleet introduced by Indian Railways, with modern on-board facilities. Its inaugural run was on 24 May 2017 from Mumbai's Chhatrapati Shivaji Terminus to Karmali in Goa, which was later extended to Madgaon Junction railway station. It coveres 581 km (361 mi) in eight hours and 50 minutes.

The Mumbai CSMT–Madgaon Vande Bharat Express semi-high-speed train, was also introduced by Indian Railways, with modern on-board facilities. Its inaugural run was on 27 June 2023 from Mumbai's Chhatrapati Shivaji Terminus to Madgaon Junction railway station in Goa. It covers 581 km (361 mi) in 7:45 hours outside Monsoon period and in 10 hours during Monsoon.

=== Freight ===
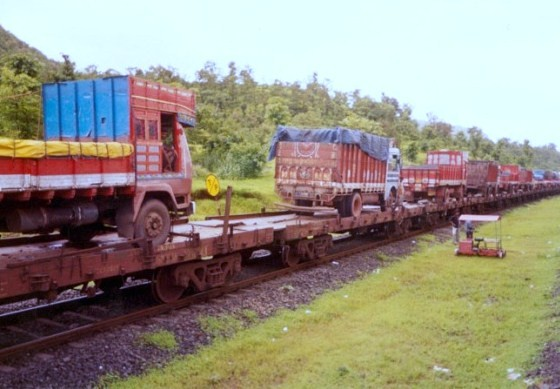
A RORO train at the Sawantwadi Road railway station

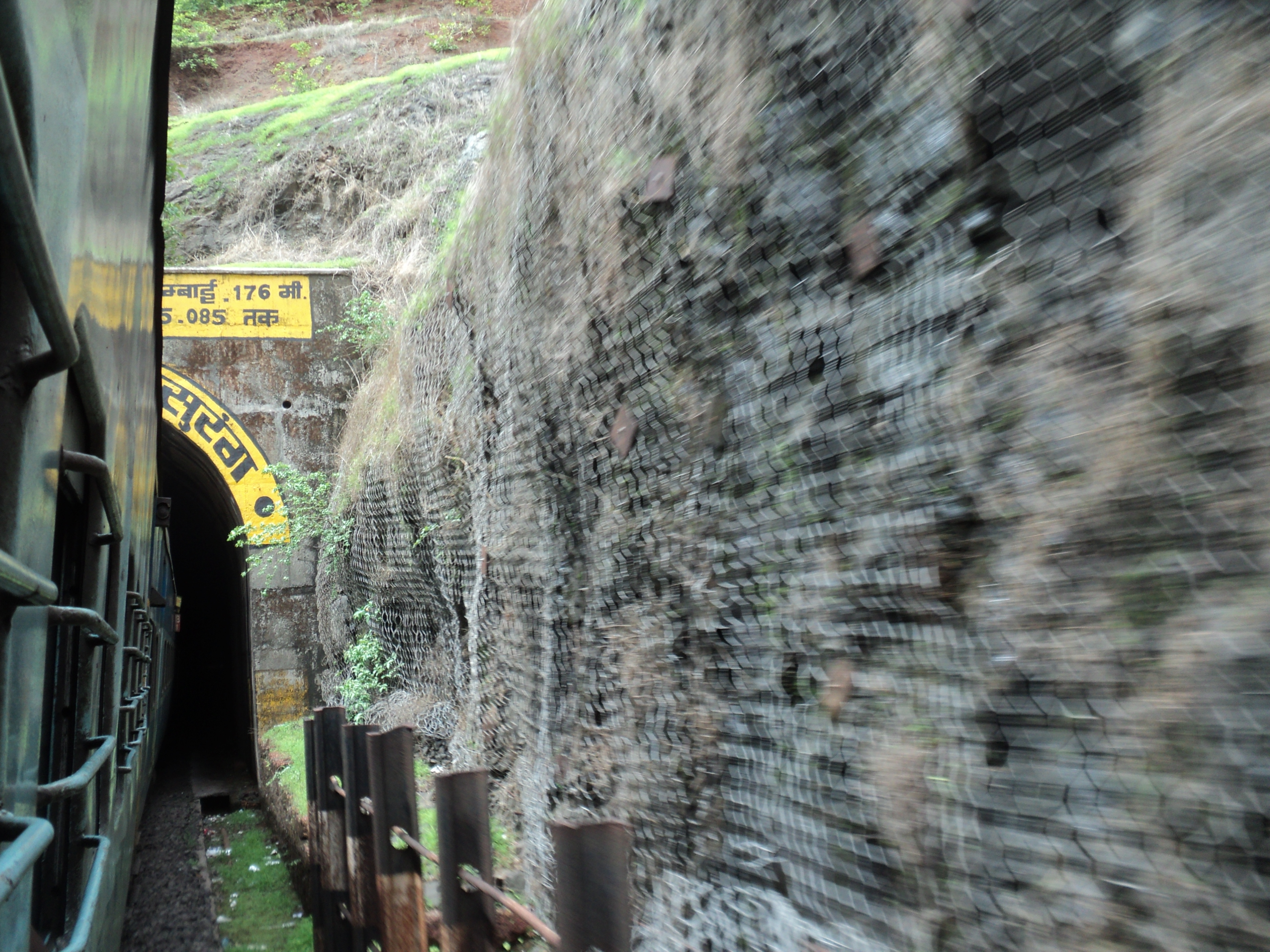
Hillside near a tunnel entrance is covered in chainlink to prevent landslides and falling rocks.

Freight response to the railway was lukewarm, prompting its corporation to consider reducing its rates. With an outstanding debt of ₹33.75 billion, the KRCL was counting on freight traffic for revenue. To attract freight traffic, the corporation began advertising to industries on the route.

The corporation introduced roll-on/roll-off (RORO) service, a road-rail system, on the section between Kolad (Maharashtra) and Verna, Goa in 1999; it was extended to the Surathkal railway station in Karnataka in 2004. The RORO service, the first of its kind in India, allowed trucks to be transported on flatcars. It has been popular, carrying about 1.6 million trucks and earning over ₹1.2 billion by 2009.

== Safety ==
The terrain and weather of the Konkan region have caused problems for the railway. During the 1998 monsoon, torrential rains triggered landslides which washed away tracks and disrupted service. Despite the corporation's efforts to address the problems through engineering (such as protective netting along cuttings to prevent boulders from rolling onto the tracks), the problems recurred each year.

The line's first major accident occurred on the night of 22 June 2003, when a landslide derailed a Karwar–Mumbai express train at the entrance to a tunnel. Fifty-one people died as a result of the accident, and others were injured. As a result, the corporation was severely criticised for failing to take adequate safety measures in the landslide-prone region. An inquiry reported that the cause of the accident was the failure of a cutting due to the lack of monsoon patrolling. The findings were disputed by the corporation, which said that the lack of monsoon patrolling did not lead to the accident (which was due to forces of nature). Shortly after the accident, however, the corporation announced that it would enhance safety measures on the route.

Barely a year later, the measures were found inadequate when a second major accident occurred on 16 June 2004. A Mangalore–Mumbai Matsyaganda Express derailed and fell off a bridge after striking boulders on the tracks, killing 20 people. Again, the corporation insisted that the accident was due to forces of nature. Questions were then raised about the safety and reliability of the Konkan Railway. An inquiry by the Commissioner of Railway Safety ruled that the accident was caused by the "falling of boulders and earth" on the tracks. After the report was issued, the corporation implemented its recommendations. These included reducing train speeds during the monsoon to 75 km/h (47 mph) from 120 km/h (75 mph) and engineering measures such as boulder netting, shotcreting, rock bolting, micropiling and vetiver plantations along the line to improve safety.

Trains carrying passengers and running through Konkan railway track line have a Monsoon Time Table usually from 15 June to 20 October every year which is rainy season for the west coast of India. During this period, speed of trains are reduced for safety purpose and more trackmen (gangmen) are employed to watch for floods and landslides.

A goods train carrying fertilizers derailed between Diwankhavti and Khed stations at Km 83/7Km at 15:57 on 10 May 2020. This happened during COVID-19 lockdown when regular passenger and goods trains were stopped by Central government of India. There was no injury or casualty. Traffic resumed on the railway on 13 May 2020 at 09:15.

== See also ==
- Indian Railways
- Konkan Railway Corporation
- Pernem–Karwar Suburban Railway
