= Chiplun railway station =

Railway Station in Maharashtra, India

Chiplun
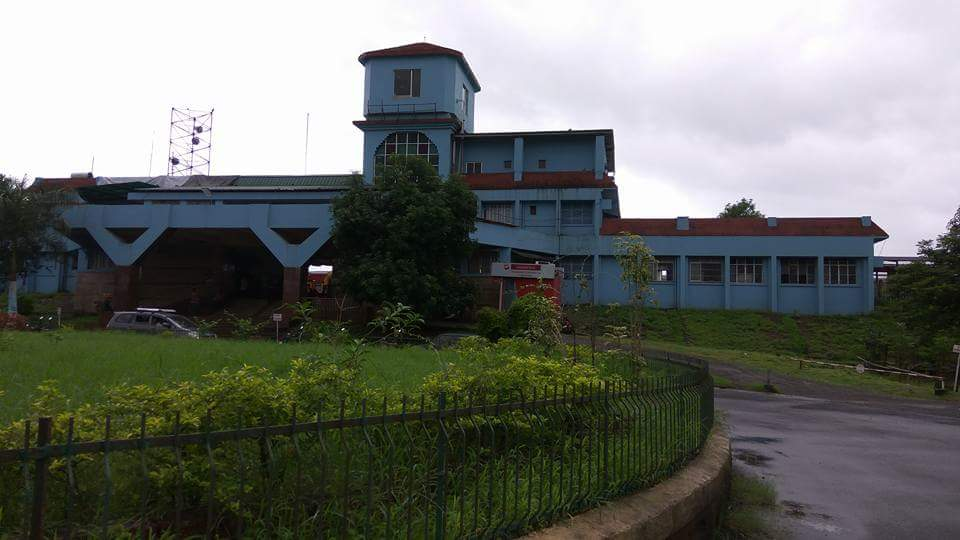

General information
- Location: Chiplun, Ratnagiri district, Maharashtra
- Coordinates: 17°32′33″N 73°31′19″E
- System: Regular Indian Railways station
- Owner: Indian Railways
- Line: Konkan Railway
- Platforms: 2
- Tracks: 4

Construction
- Structure type: On Ground
- Parking: yes

Other information
- Status: Functioning
- Station code: CHI
- Fare zone: konkan Railway

Services
Preceding station	Indian Railways	Following station
Anjani towards Roha	Konkan Railway Konkan Railway	Kamathe towards Thokur
Route map
Location
- Location within India Location within Maharashtra

Chiplun railway station is a train station on Konkan Railways. It is located just off NH 66 in the Konkan town of Chiplun. The preceding station on the line is Anjani railway station and the next station is Kamathe railway station.

== Trains ==
- 10103/10104 Mandovi Express
- 10111/10112 Konkan Kanya Express
- 11003/11004 Tutari Express
- 11085/11086 Lokmanya Tilak Terminus–Madgaon AC Double Decker Express
- 11099/11100 Lokmanya Tilak Terminus–Madgaon AC Double Decker Express
- 12051/12052 Dadar–Madgaon Jan Shatabdi Express
- 12483/12484 Kochuveli–Amritsar Weekly Express
- 12617/12618 Mangala Lakshadweep Express
- 12619/12620 Matsyagandha Express
- 12741/12742 Vasco da Gama–Patna Superfast Express
- 16335/16336 Gandhidham–Nagercoil Express
- 16345/16346 Netravati Express
- 19259/19260 Kochuveli–Bhavnagar Express
- 19331/19332 Kochuveli–Indore Weekly Express
- 22113/22114 Lokmanya Tilak Terminus–Kochuveli Express
- 22115/22116 Lokmanya Tilak Terminus–Karmali AC Superfast Express
- 22119/22120 Mumbai CSMT–Karmali Tejas Express
- 22149/22150 Pune–Ernakulam Express
- 22475/22476 Hisar–Coimbatore AC Superfast Express
- 22629/22630 Dadar–Tirunelveli Express
- 22633/22634 Thiruvananthapuram–Hazrat Nizamuddin Express
- 50103/50104 Dadar Central–Ratnagiri Passenger
- 50105/50106 Sindhudurg Passenger

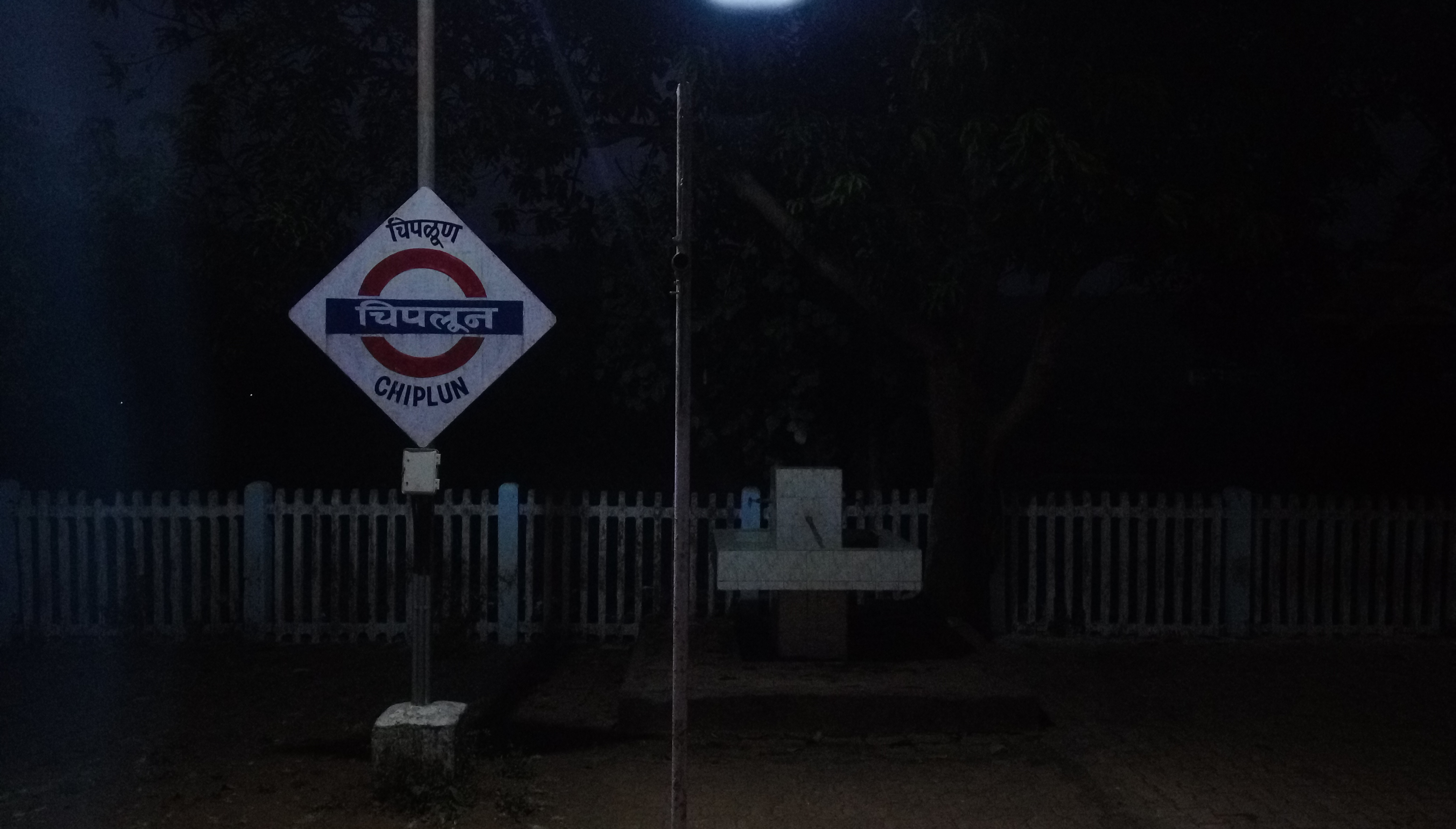
Chiplun railway station – Platform board
