= Mumbai CSMT–Madgaon Jan Shatabdi Express =

Train in India

Mumbai CSMT - Madgaon Junction Jan Shatabdi Express
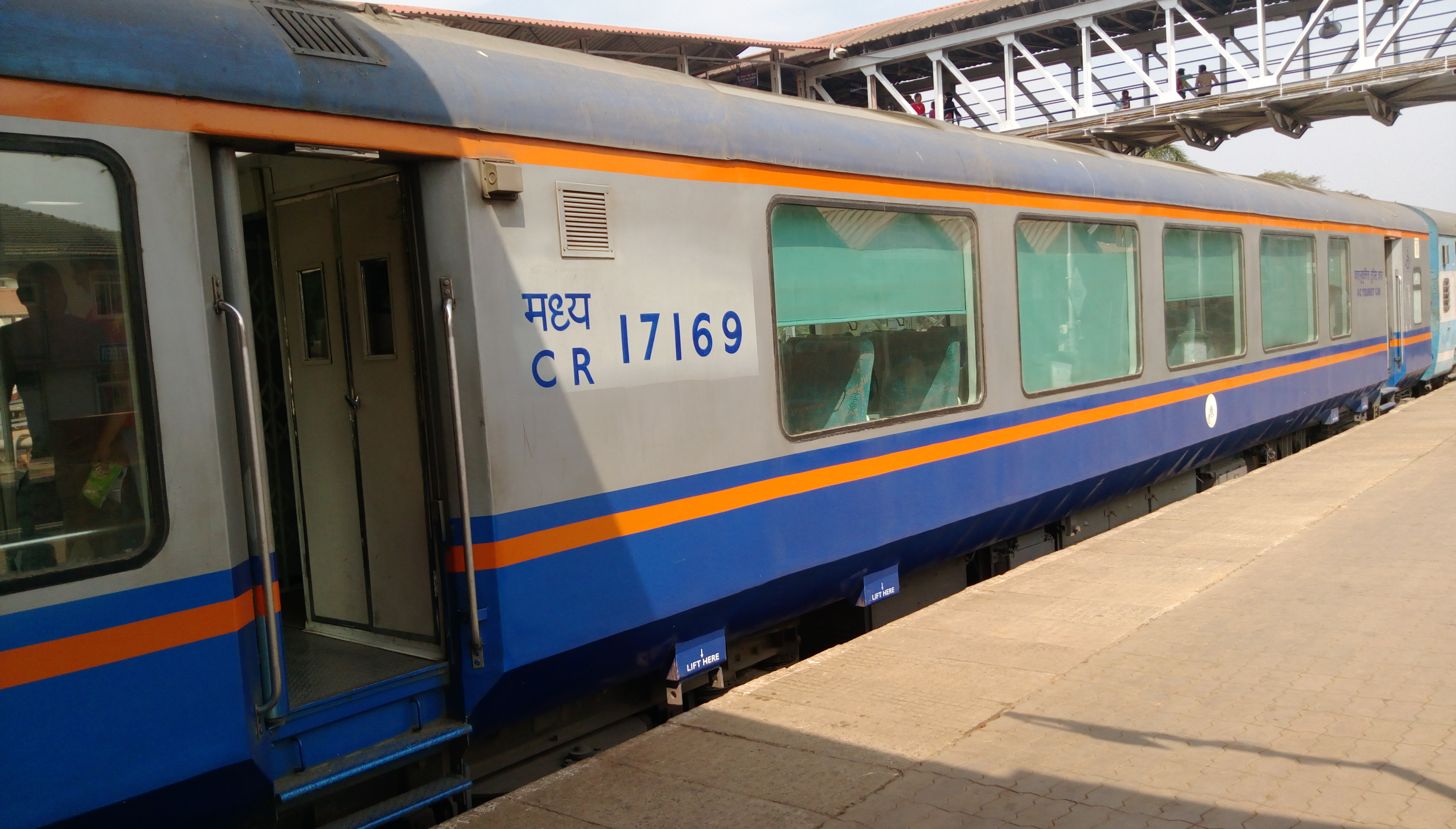
- A Vistadome coach of the train

Overview
- Service type: Jan Shatabdi Express
- Locale: Maharashtra, Goa
- First service: 16 April 2002; 24 years ago
- Current operator: Central Railways (CR)

Route
- Termini: Chhatrapati Shivaji Maharaj Terminus (CSMT); Madgaon Junction (MAO)
- Stops: 8
- Distance travelled: 572 km (355 mi)
- Service frequency: Daily service
- Train number: 12051 / 12052

On-board services
- Classes: Vistadome, AC chair car, executive AC chair car, second class seating
- Seating arrangements: Yes
- Sleeping arrangements: No
- Catering facilities: Yes (only for executive AC chair car)
- Observation facilities: Rake sharing with Mumbai-Pune Deccan express
- Baggage facilities: Overhead racks
- Other facilities: Vistadome coach

Technical
- Rolling stock: LHB coach & Vistadome coaches
- Track gauge: 1,676 mm (5 ft 6 in)
- Operating speed: 65.88 km/h (40.94 mph)

The 12052/12051 Mumbai CSMT - Madgaon Junction Jan Shatabdi Express is a Superfast Express train belonging to Indian Railways - Konkan Railway division that runs between Chhatrapati Shivaji Maharaj Terminus and Madgaon in India.

It operates as train number 12051 from CSMT to Madgaon Junction and as train number 12052 in the reverse direction. During monsoon timetable, 12052 will not go in reverse direction due to time clash. It will rest at Madgaon Junction coming from CSMT and next day that same rake will originate from Madgaon Junction. It is one of the fastest and longest routes running Jan Shatabdi train in Konkan Railways, and is immensely popular amongst the people travelling to Konkan and Goa. This train used to originate/terminate at Dadar Terminus in Mumbai.

== Coaches ==
This train has presently has one Vistadome coach, three AC chair cars, 10 second class Jan Shatabdi seating coaches, one SLR coach and one generator car.

== Service ==
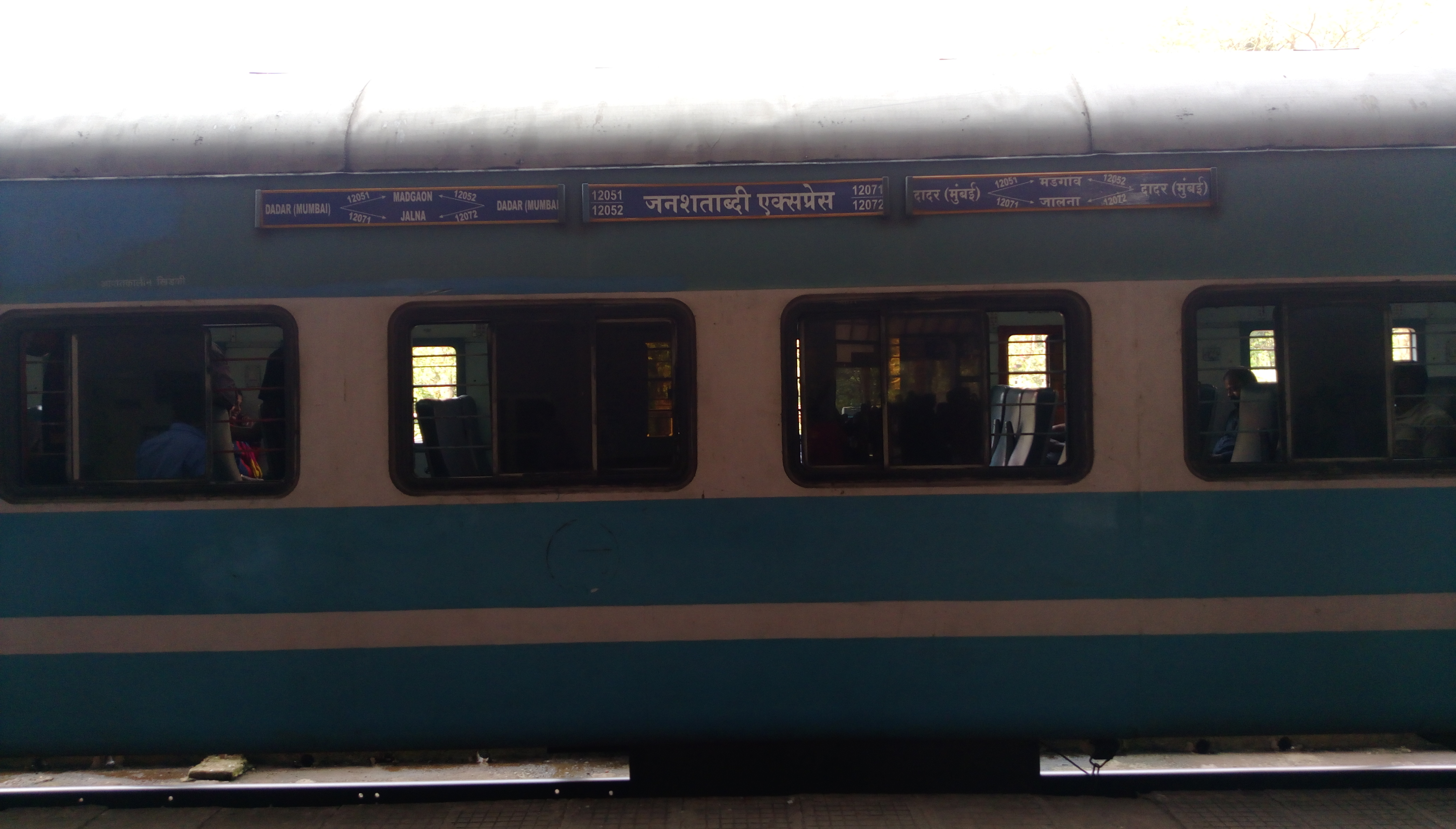
Second class seating

It covers the distance of 572 kilometers in 8 hours 40 mins (65.26 km/h) as train number 12051 and in 9 hours (66.52 km/h) as train number 12052.

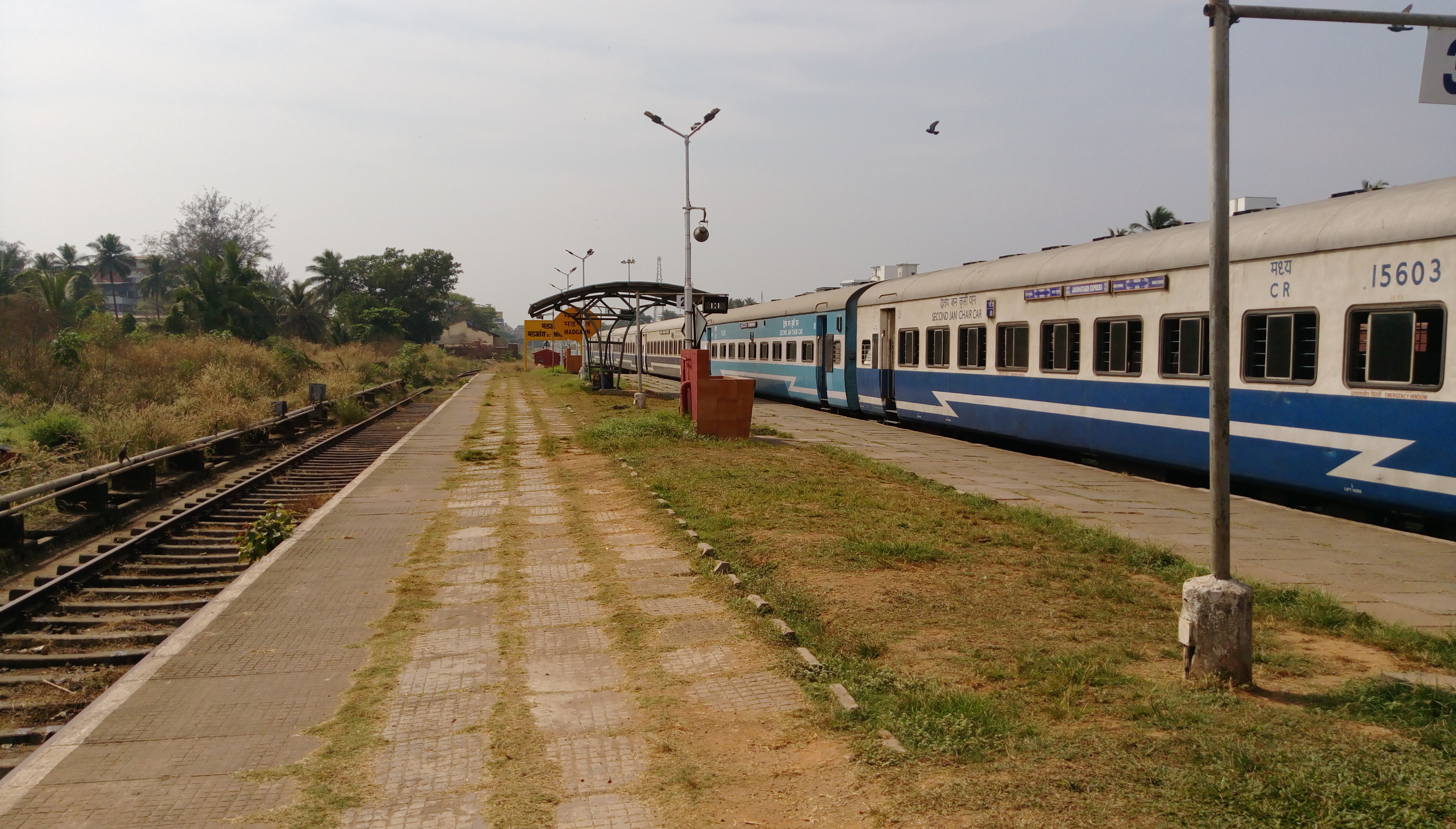
Dadar Madgaon Jan Shatabdi Express leaving Madgaon Junction railway station

== Route ==
This train runs via Dadar, Thane, Panvel, Chiplun, Ratnagiri, Kankavli, Kudal, Sawantwadi Road, Thivim to Madgaon Junction.

== Traction ==
Both trains were hauled by an Ernakulam based WDM-3A twins or WDP-4, GOC WDP-4B or 4D. Currently as Konkan Railways have completed electrification, the train is now hauled by a WCAM-3 from Kalyan shed.

It can be hauled by a WAP 7 so did WAP-4 or WAG-7.

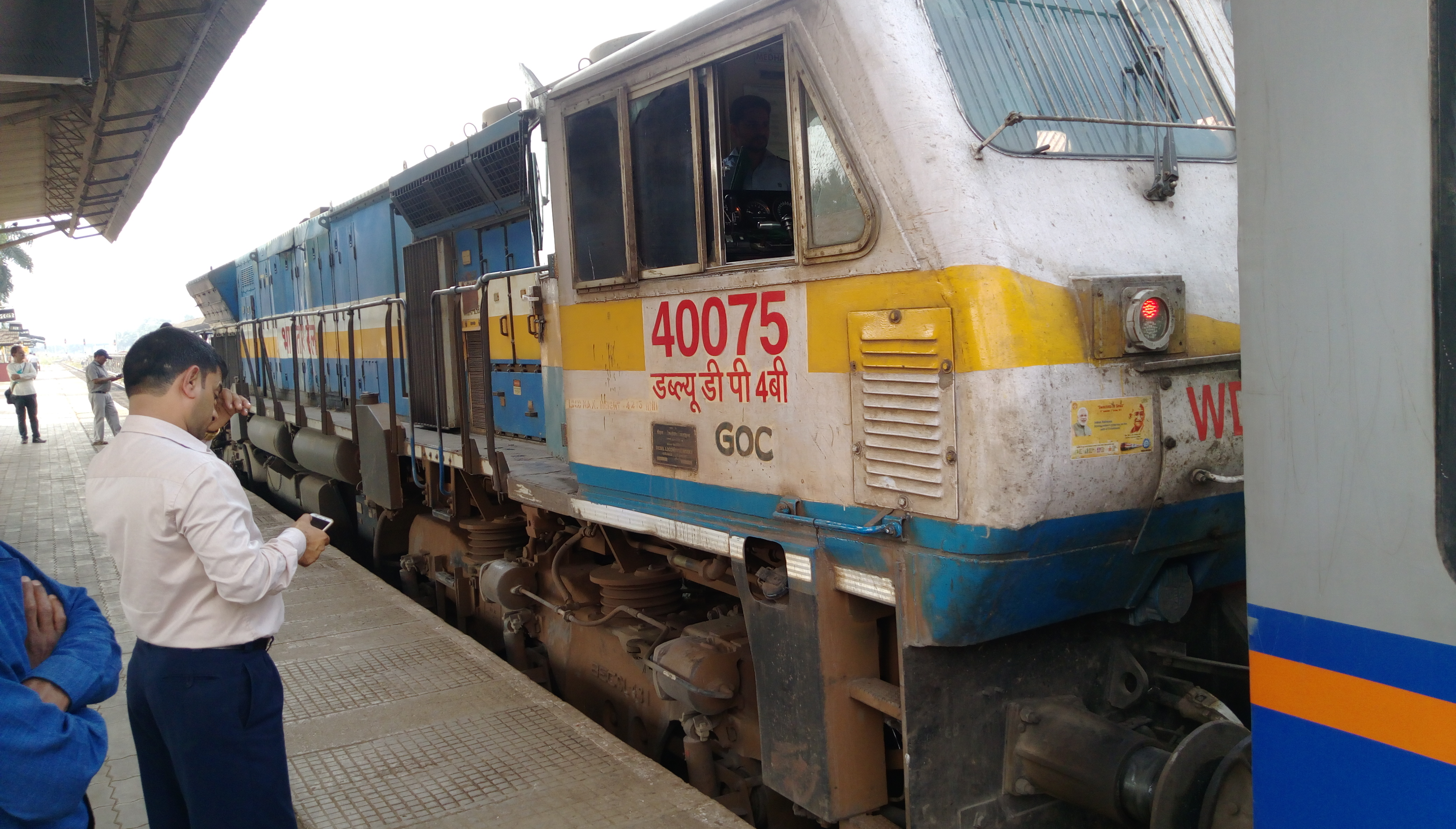
WDP4B engine used to haul the train

== Sister trains ==
- Semi-high speed:
1. Mumbai CST - Karmali Tejas Express
2. Mumbai CSMT-Madgaon Vande Bharat Express
- Premium:
1. Lokmanya Tilak Terminus - Karmali AC Superfast Express (Formal service)
2. Mumbai LTT - Madgaon AC Double Decker Express (Formal service)
- Superfast:
1. Konkan Kanya Express
- Express/mail:
1. Mandovi Express

== See also ==
- Deccan Express (rake sharing with this train)
