= Ernakulam Duronto =

Ernakulam Duronto may refer to:

- Ernakulam-H.Nizamudin Duronto, a weekly non-stop superfast train which runs between Kochi, and the national capital New Delhi
- Ernakulam-Lokmanya Tilak Duronto, is a bi-weekly nonstop superfast train between Kochi and Mumbai
