= Kochi Duronto =

Kochi Duronto may refer to:

- Ernakulam-H.Nizamudin Duronto
- Ernakulam-Lokmanya Tilak Duronto
