= Pune–Ernakulam Express =

Train in India

Pune–Ernakulam Superfast Express

Overview
- Service type: Superfast Express
- First service: 27 November 2010; 15 years ago
- Current operator: Central Railway

Route
- Termini: Pune (PUNE); Ernakulam (ERS)
- Stops: 18
- Distance travelled: 1,364 km (848 mi)
- Average journey time: 24 hours 35 minutes
- Service frequency: Bi-weekly
- Train number: 22149 / 22150

On-board services
- Classes: AC 2 Tier, AC 3 Tier, Sleeper Class, General Unreserved
- Seating arrangements: Yes
- Sleeping arrangements: Yes
- Catering facilities: On-board catering, E-catering
- Observation facilities: Large windows
- Baggage facilities: Available
- Other facilities: Below the seats

Technical
- Rolling stock: LHB coach
- Track gauge: 1,676 mm (5 ft 6 in)
- Operating speed: 57 km/h (35 mph) average including halts.

The 22149 / 22150 Pune–Ernakulam Superfast Express is an superfast express train service operated by Central Railways that runs between Pune Junction in Maharashtra and Ernakulam Junction in Kerala, via Konkan Railway, via Panvel.

== Route and halts ==
- Pune Junction
- Panvel
- Chiplun
- Ratnagiri
- Kankavli
- Sawantwadi Road
- Madgaon
- Karwar
- Kundapura
- Udupi
- Mangalore Junction
- Kasaragod
- Kannur
- Thalassery
- Vadakara
- Kozhikode
- Tirur
- Shoranur Junction
- Thrissur
- Ernakulam

== Traction ==
The trains are hauled by various locomotives on a rotational basis such as a Pune/Kalyan based WAP-7, Kalyan based WCAM-3, WAG-7, etc. This train uses the electric traction during the entire route.

== Direction reversal ==
The train reverses its direction once at Panvel Junction

== Rake sharing ==
The train shares its rakes with 11097/11098 Poorna Express and 11033/11034 Pune–Darbhanga Gyan Ganga Express.
