= Lokmanya Tilak Terminus–Madgaon AC Double Decker Express =

Lokmanya Tilak Terminus–Madgaon Junction AC Double Decker Express
Overview
- Service type: Double Decker
- Status: Discontinued
- Locale: Maharashtra & Goa
- First service: 11085/11086 on 7 December 2015 11099/11100 on 15 June 2019
- Current operator: Central Railway

Route
- Termini: Lokmanya Tilak Terminus (LTT); Madgaon Junction (MAO)
- Stops: 9
- Distance travelled: 592 km
- Average journey time: 12 h approx
- Service frequency: Twice a week as 11085/11086 & Weekly as 11099/11100
- Train numbers: 11085/11086 & 11099/11100

On-board services
- Classes: AC Chair Car, 2AC, 3AC.
- Seating arrangements: Available
- Catering facilities: Available (paid)
- Observation facilities: LHB double decker coaches
- Baggage facilities: Available

Technical
- Track gauge: 1,676 mm (5 ft 6 in)
- Electrification: No
- Operating speed: Average – 60 km/h Maximum – 110 km/h

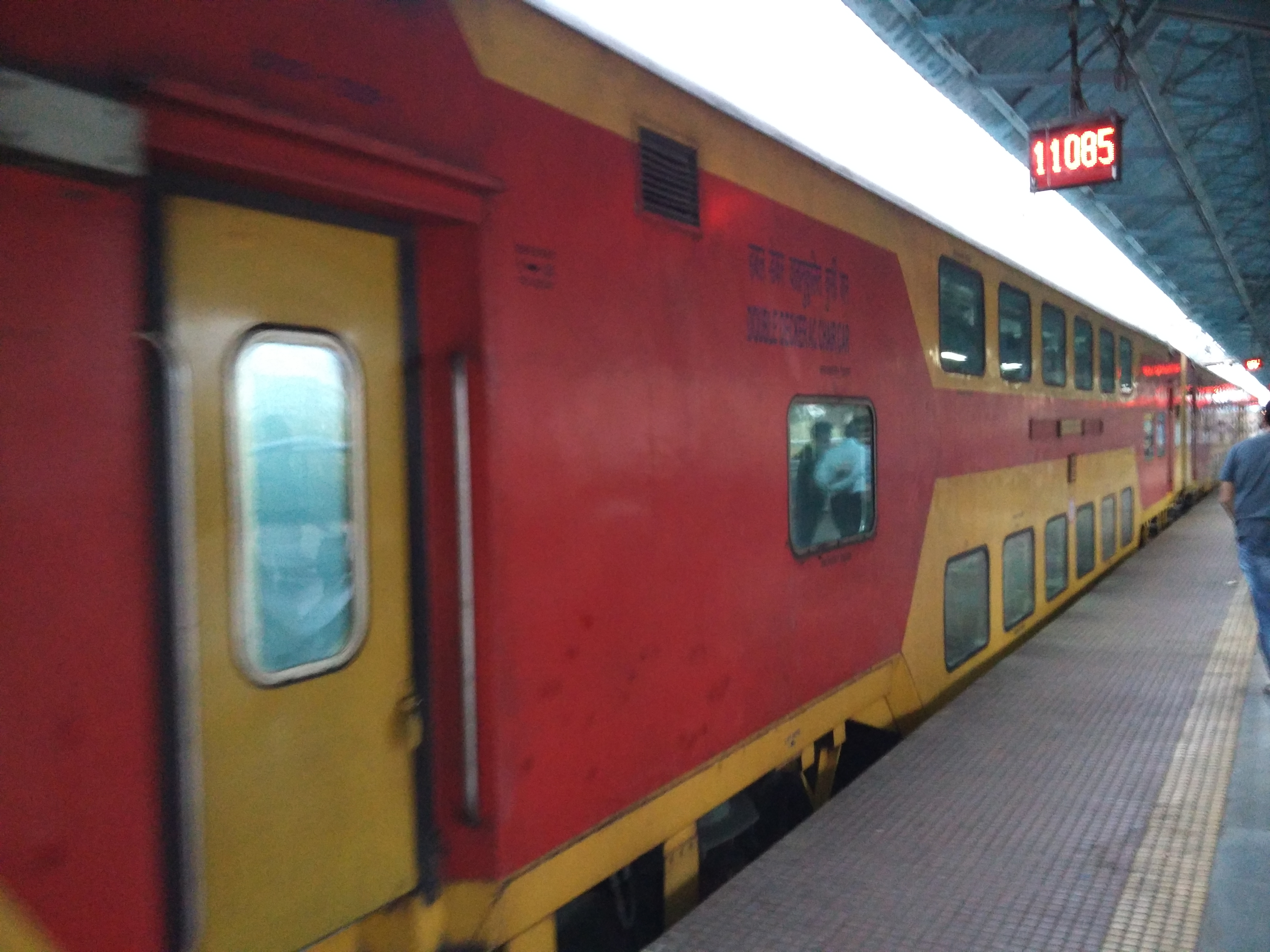
Mumbai LTT–Madgaon Junction AC Double Decker Express arriving at Panvel railway station

11085/11086 & 11099/11100 Lokmanya Tilak Terminus–Madgaon Junction AC Double Decker Express was the Double Decker trains of Indian Railways, which were the first of its type to be introduced. They are accommodated with latest stainless steel LHB coach. They link Mumbai, the capital of Maharashtra and Madgaon, an important town in Goa through Konkan Railway. The Double Decker express was discontinued by railways due to less occupancy and substituted with a regular express equipped with LHB coachin November 2022.

== Coaches ==
The 11085/11086 & 11099/11100 Lokmanya Tilak Terminus–Madgaon Junction AC Double Decker Express as of 2019 had 6 AC Chair Car & 2 EOG cars. As with most train services in India, coach composition may be amended depending on demand.

== Service ==
11085/11086 Lokmanya Tilak Terminus–Madgaon Junction AC Double Decker Express was first introduced on 7 December 2015. As of 2019 it runs twice a week. The 11099/11100 Lokmanya Tilak Terminus–Madgaon Junction AC Double Decker Express was first introduced on 15 June 2019. It runs weekly.

They cover the distance of 592 kilometres in 12 hours as 11085/Lokmanya Tilak Terminus–Madgaon Junction AC Double Decker Express (47 km/h) & 12 hours as 11086/Madgaon Junction–Lokmanya Tilak Terminus AC Double Decker Express (47 km/h). With maximum speed of 100 km/h.

== Route and halts ==
- Lokmanya Tilak Terminus
- Thane
- Panvel
- Khed
- Chiplun
- Ratnagiri
- Kankavali
- Sawantwadi
- Thivim
- Karmali
- Madgaon

== Traction ==
earlier was WDP-4. It has been hauled by a WAP 7(HOG Equipped) engine from the Kalyan Electric Loco Shed.

== Sister trains ==
- Lokmanya Tilak Terminus–Karmali AC Superfast Express
- Dadar–Madgaon Jan Shatabdi Express
- Konkan Kanya Express
- Mandovi Express
- Mumbai CSMT–Karmali Tejas Express
