= Hisar–Coimbatore AC Superfast Express =

Train in India

Overview
- Service type: AC Superfast
- First service: 12 September 2012; 14 years ago (initial service between Coimbatore Junction and Bikaner Junction); 4 August 2018; 8 years ago (extended upto Hisar Junction)
- Current operator: North Western Railway

Route
- Termini: Hisar (HSR); Coimbatore (CBE)
- Stops: 39
- Distance travelled: 2,783 km (1,729 mi)
- Average journey time: 48 hours 40 minutes
- Service frequency: Weekly
- Train number: 22475 / 22476

On-board services
- Classes: AC First Class, AC 2 Tier, AC 3 Tier
- Seating arrangements: No
- Sleeping arrangements: Yes
- Catering facilities: Available
- Observation facilities: Large windows
- Baggage facilities: Available
- Other facilities: Below the seats

Technical
- Rolling stock: LHB coach
- Track gauge: 1,676 mm (5 ft 6 in)
- Operating speed: 57 km/h (35 mph) average including halts.

The 22475 / 22476 Hisar–Coimbatore AC Superfast Express (previously Bikaner–Coimbatore AC Superfast Express) is a fully air conditioned, superfast express train operated by the Bikaner Division of North Western Railway zone of Indian Railways.

The train connects Tamil Nadu, Kerala, Karnataka, Goa, Maharashtra, Gujarat, Rajasthan, and Haryana.

Train numbered 22475 starts from Hisar Junction at 12:50 hrs on Wednesdays and reaches Coimbatore Junction at 17:10 hrs on Fridays. For the return journey, train numbered 22476 leaves Coimbatore Junction at 12:45 hrs on Saturdays and reaches Hisar Junction at 16:00 hrs on Mondays. This train got its LHB coach from 9 August 2018. This train is operated through Konkan Railway route. It covers distance of 2783 km.

== Route & halts ==
- Hisar Junction
- Sadulpur Junction
- Ratangarh Junction
- Bikaner Junction
- Jodhpur Junction
- Marwar Junction
- Abu Road
- Ahmedabad Junction
- Anand
- Vadodara Junction
- Surat
- Vasai Road
- Panvel
- Chiplun
- Ratnagiri
- Madgaon Junction
- Karwar
- Udupi
- Mangalore Junction
- Kannur
- Kozhikode
- Shoranur Junction
- Palakkad Junction
- Coimbatore Junction

== Schedule ==
Train number	Station code	Departure station	Departure time	Departure day	Arrival station code	Arrival station	Arrival time	Arrival day
22475	HSR	Hisar Junction	12.50 PM	Wednesday	CBE	Coimbatore Junction	02:40 PM	Friday
22476	CBE	Coimbatore Junction	02:55 PM	Saturday	HSR	Hisar Junction	04:00 PM	Monday

== Traction ==
earlier was WDM-3A. As the route is fully electrified, it is hauled by a Bhagat Ki Kothi Loco Shed based WAP-7 electric locomotive on its entire journey.

== Direction reversal ==
The train reverses its direction once at;

- Bikaner Junction.
