= Madgaon Junction railway station =

Railway station in Goa, India

Madgaon Junction Railway Station
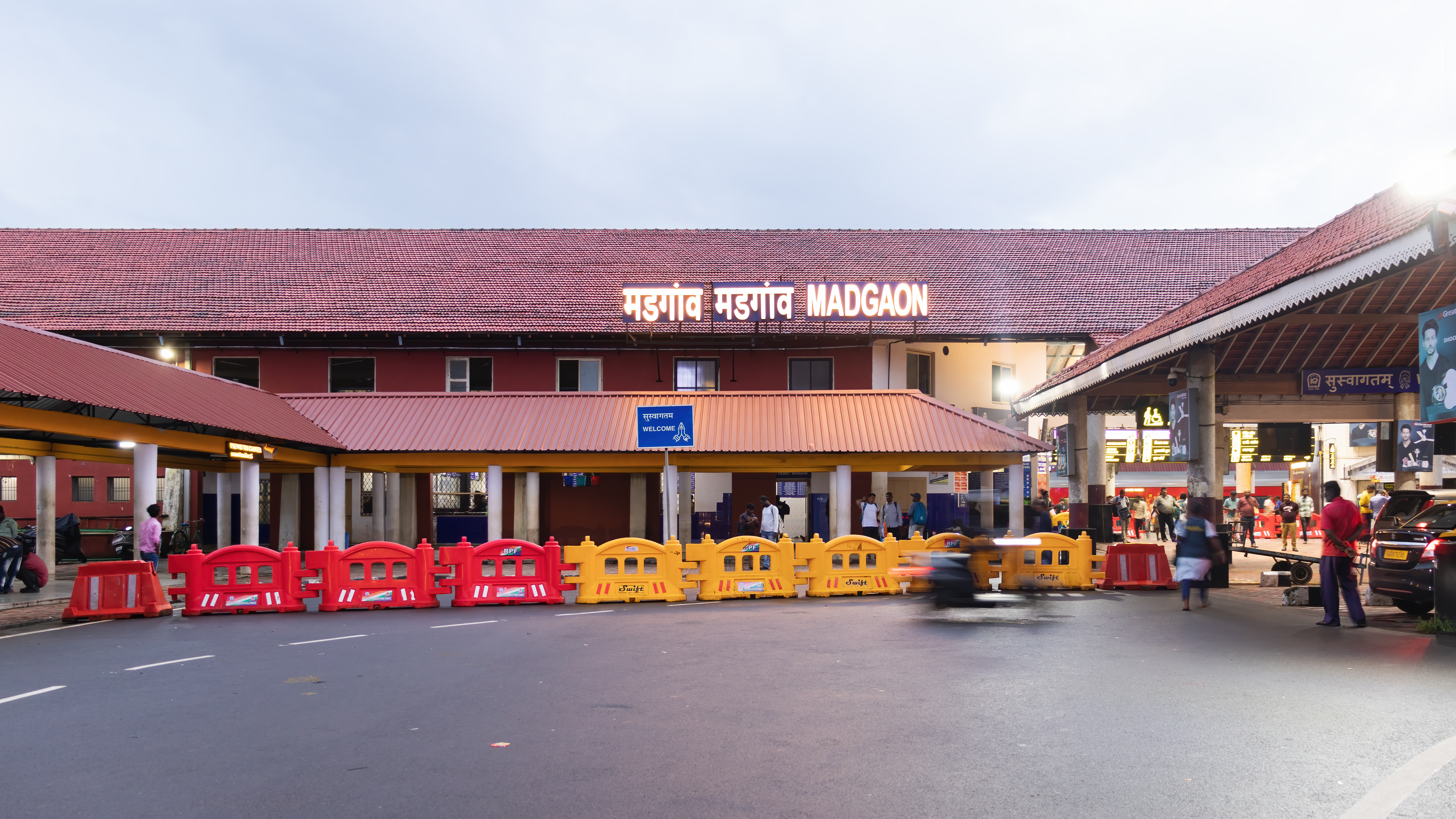

General information
- Location: Madgaon, Goa; India
- Coordinates: 15.2677°N 73.9711°E
- Elevation: 8.852 metres (29.04 ft)
- System: Express train and Passenger train station
- Owner: Indian Railways
- Operator: Konkan Railway
- Lines: Konkan Railway Line, Hubballi–Vasco da Gama section
- Platforms: 6
- Tracks: 7

Construction
- Structure type: Standard (on-ground station)
- Parking: Available

Other information
- Status: Functioning
- Station code: MAO
- Zone(s): Konkan Railways
- Division(s): Karwar

Services
Preceding station	Indian Railways	Following station
Suravali towards Roha	Konkan Railway Konkan Railway	Balli towards Thokur
Suravali towards ?	South Western Railway zone Guntakal–Vasco da Gama section	Sanjuje Da Arey towards ?
Route map
Location
- Location within India Location within Goa
- Interactive map

Madgaon Junction Railway Station (station code: MAO) is a railway junction and major station on the Indian Railways network in Goa, India. It serves the South Western Railway line to Vasco da Gama, Goa and the Konkan Railway, in Madgaon, Goa, India. The station is progressing by getting electrified and double-tracked with the addition of new platforms.

== Major trains ==
Major trains available from Madgaon Junction are as follows:

● Mumbai CSMT–Madgaon Vande Bharat Express (22229/22230)

● Mangaluru Central–Madgaon Vande Bharat Express (20645/20646)

● Mumbai CSMT–Madgaon Tejas Express (22119/22120)

● Ernakulam–H.Nizamuddin Duronto Express (12283/12284)

● Lokmanya Tilak Terminus–Ernakulam Duronto Express (12223/12224)

● Madgaon–Hazrat Nizamuddin Rajdhani Express (22413/22414)

● Hazrat Nizamuddin–Thiruvananthapuram Rajdhani Express (12431/12432)

● Hisar–Coimbatore AC Superfast Express (22475/22476)

● Lokmanya Tilak Terminus–Karmali AC Superfast Express (22115/22116)

● Tirunelveli–Gandhidham Humsafar Express (20923/20924)

● Mandovi Express (10103/10104)

● Bandra Terminus–Madgaon Express (10115/10116)

● Madgaon–Ernakulam Superfast Express (10215/10216)

● Mumbai CSMT–Madgaon Jan Shatabdi Express (12051/12052)

● Howrah–Vasco da Gama Amaravati Express (18047/18048)

● Goa Sampark Kranti Express (12449/12450)

● Kerala Sampark Kranti Express (12217/12218)

● Konkan Kanya Express (20111/20112)

● Madgaon–Hapa Superfast Express (22907/22908)

● Matsyagandha Express (12619/12620)

● Thiruvananthapuram North–Amritsar Weekly Express (12483/12484)

● Sawantwadi Road–Madgaon Passenger (50107/50108)

● Thiruvananthapuram North–Lokmanya Tilak Terminus Garib Rath Express (12201/12202)

● Thiruvananthapuram North–Yog Nagari Rishikesh Superfast Express (22659/22660)

● Thiruvananthapuram–Hazrat Nizamuddin Express (Via Alappuzha) (22633/22634)

● Thiruvananthapuram North−Porbandar Superfast Express (20909/20910)

● Thiruvananthapuram North–Indore Weekly Express (20931/20932)

● Mangala Lakshadweep Express (12617/12618)

● Vasco da Gama–Patna Superfast Express (12741/12742)

● Dadar–Tirunelveli Express (22629/22630)

● Mumbai LTT-Thiruvananthapuram Central Netravati Express(16345/16346)

== Administration ==
Madgaon Junction falls under Karwar region of Konkan Railway in Goa.

== Connectivity ==
Madgaon railway junction in the state of Goa has direct rail connection with several major cities in India. All the major metropolitan cities of India, namely, New Delhi, Mumbai, Kolkata and Chennai. The other cities of India, Bangalore, Miraj, Hubli, Mangalore, Pune, Hyderabad, Vijayawada, Visakhapatnam, Thiruvananthapuram, Kochi (Ernakulam Junction), Surat, Vadodara, Jaipur, Jodhpur, Bikaner, Jaisalmer, Kota, Agra, Jhansi, Jabalpur, Bhopal, Gwalior, Chandigarh, Dehradun, Bhubaneswar, Udupi, Suratkal and Patna.

Two Rajdhani Express, i.e., Trivandrum Rajdhani and Madgaon Rajdhani connect Madgaon Junction with Hazrat Nizamuddin railway station in New Delhi along with other trains like Mangala Lakshadweep Express, Kerala Sampark Kranti Express and Goa Express.

Many trains including the Konkan Kanya Express, Mandovi Express, Matsyagandha Express, Netravati Express, Mumbai CSMT–Madgaon Jan Shatabdi Express connect Madgaon to Mumbai.

== Lines ==
The South Western Railway on the Guntakal–Vasco da Gama section and the Konkan Railway from Mumbai, Maharashtra to Mangalore, Karnataka pass through this junction.

== Gallery ==
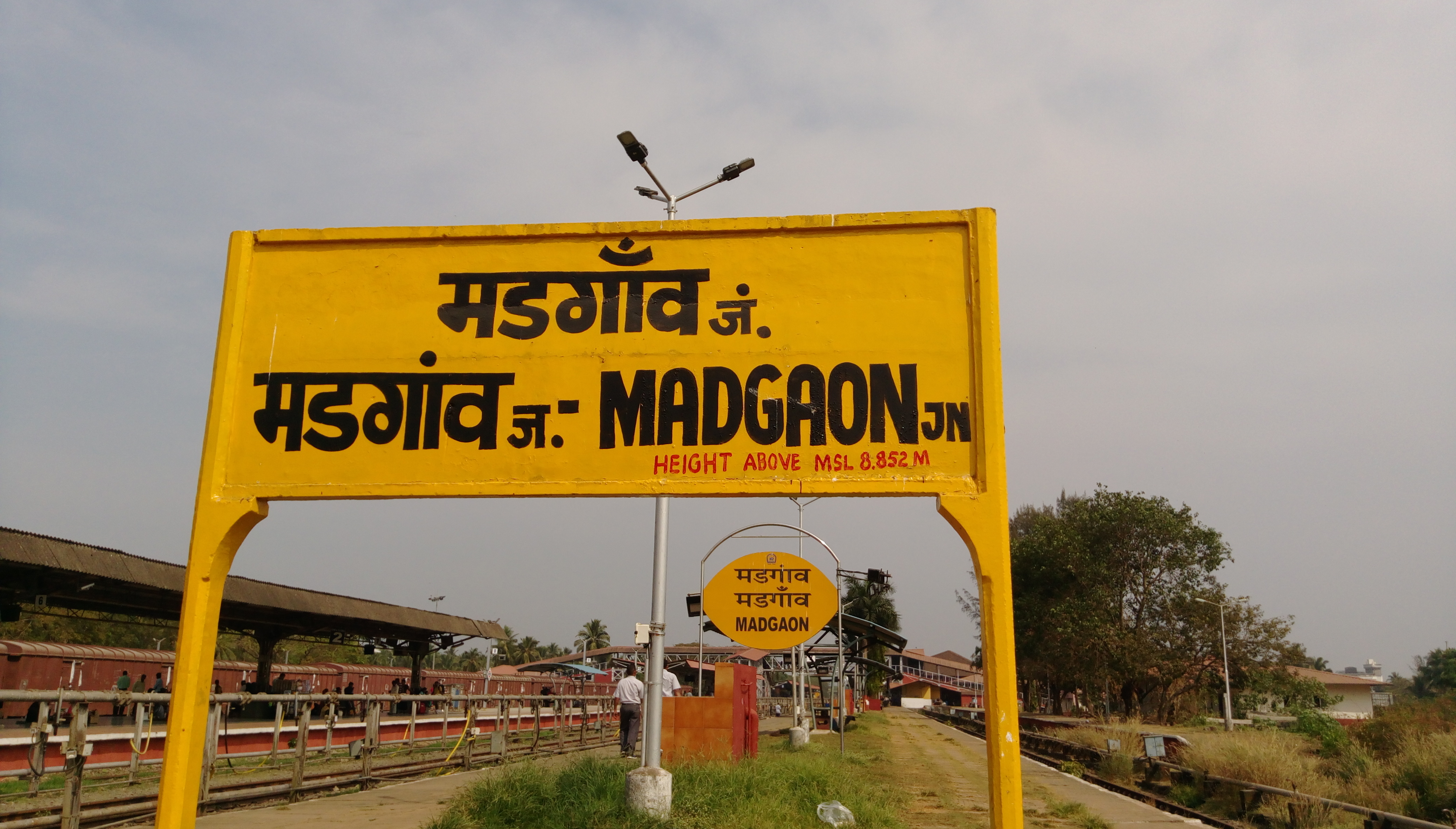
Madgaon railway station – Station board

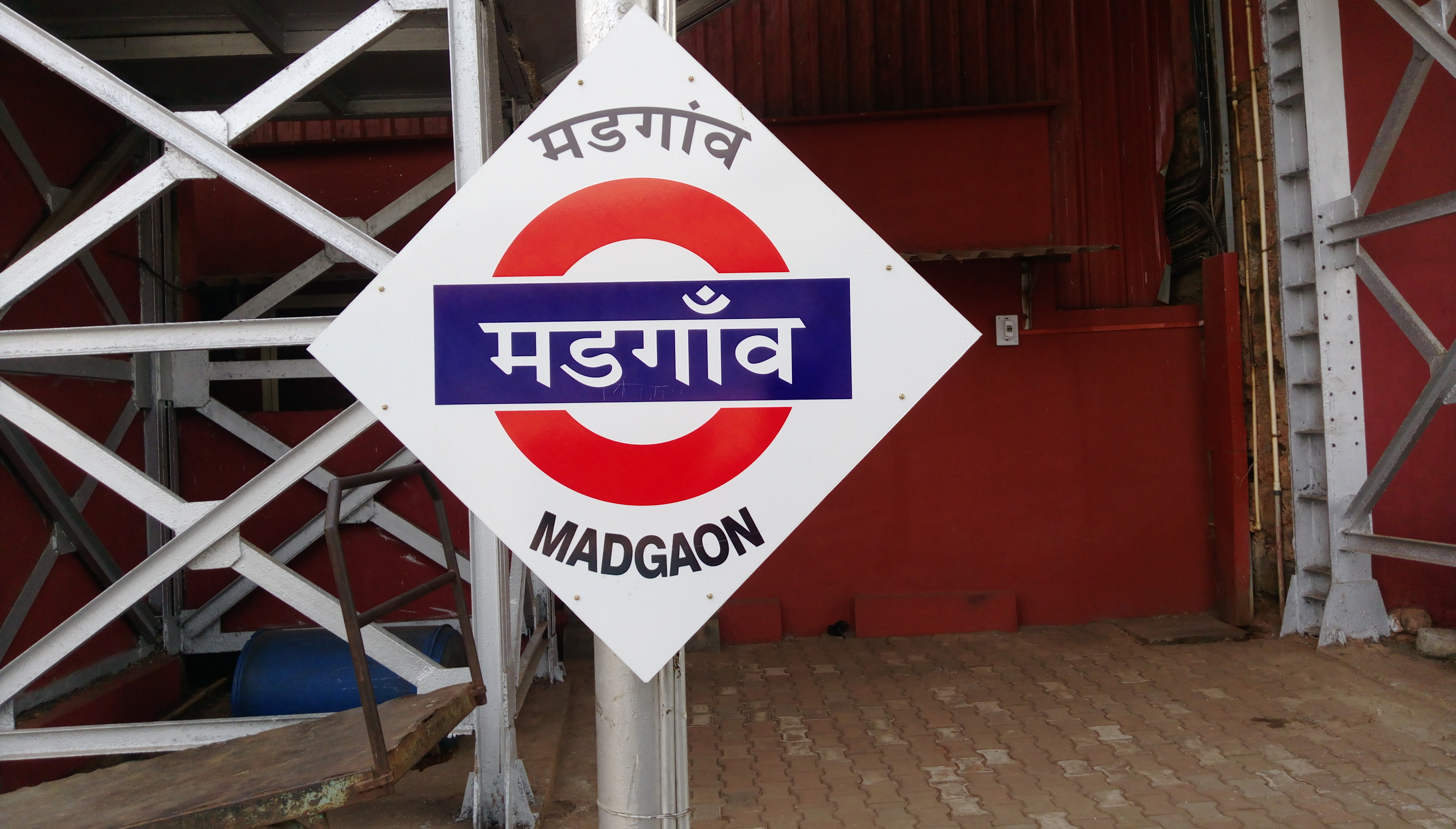
Madgaon railway station – Platform board

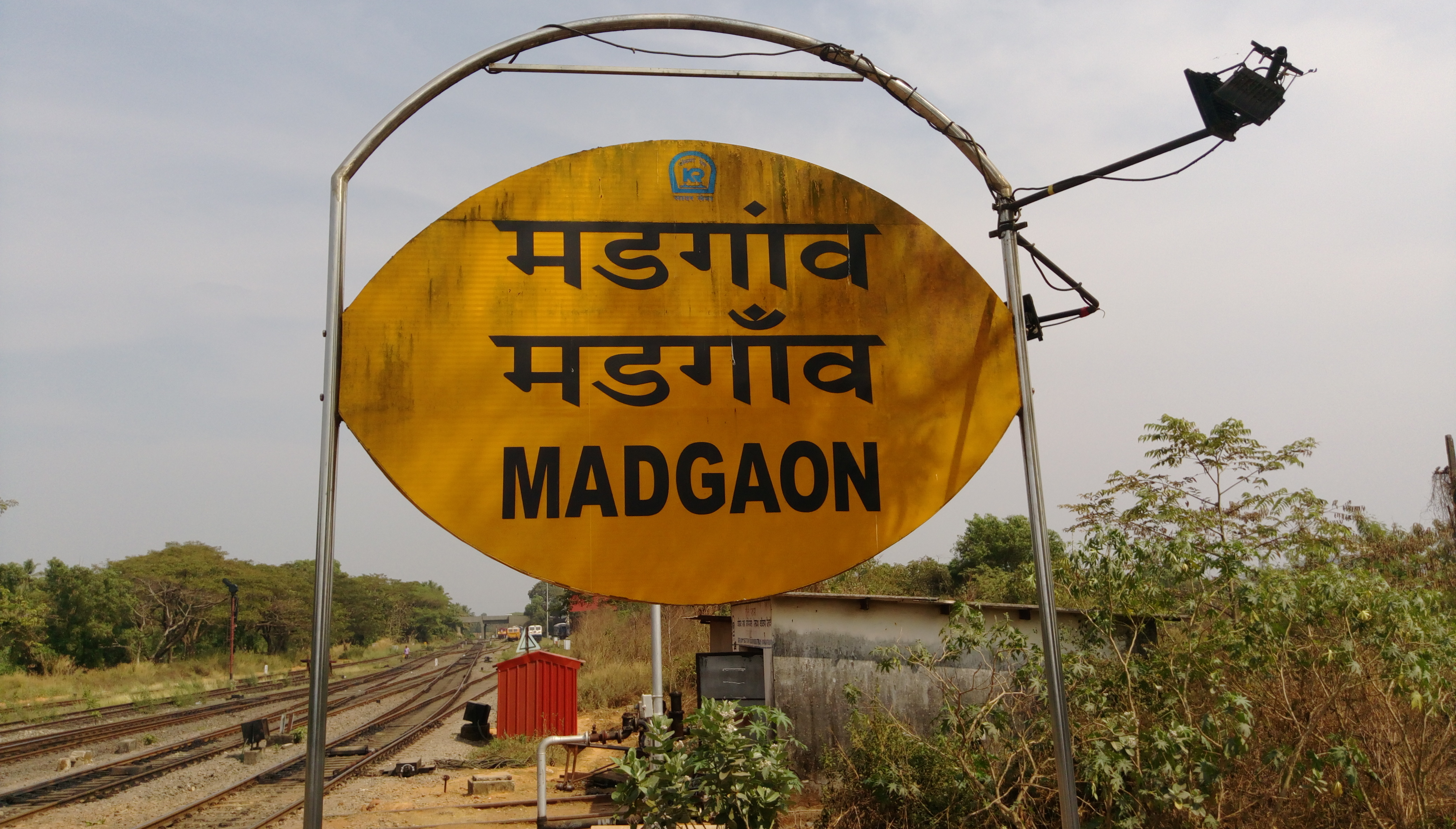
Madgaon railway station – Small station board

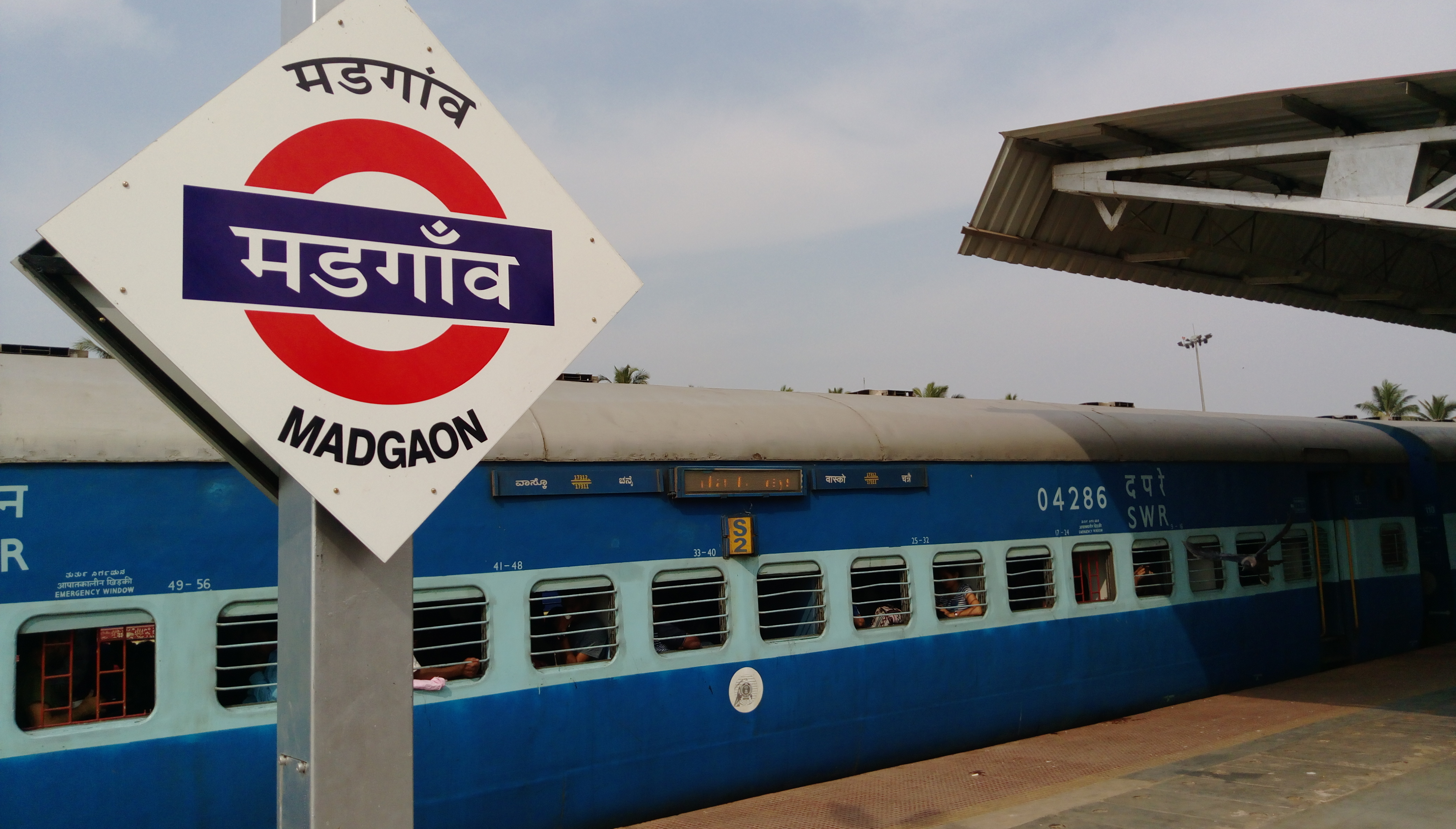
Vasco–Chennai Express at Madgaon station

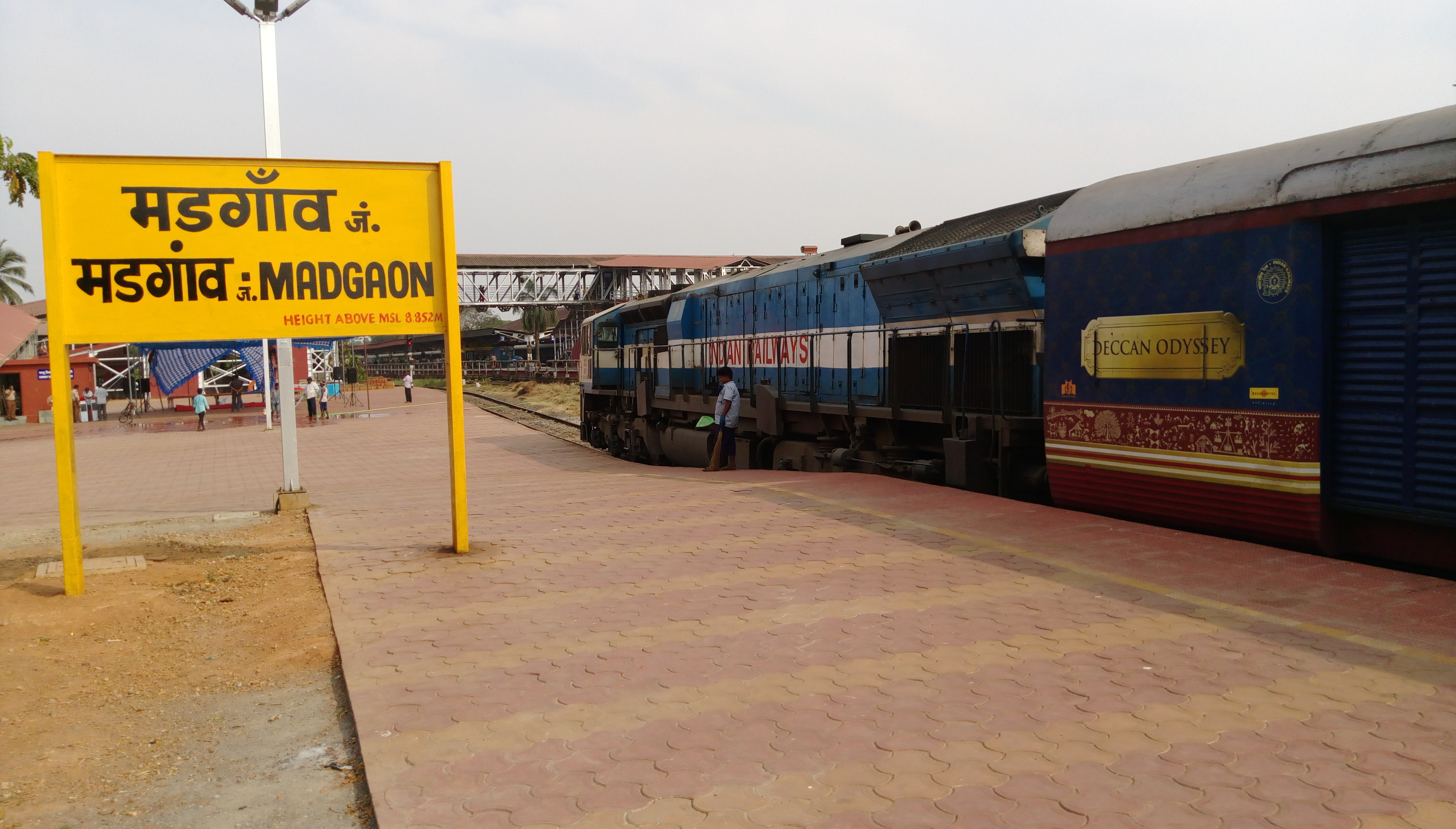
Deccan Odyssey at Madgaon station

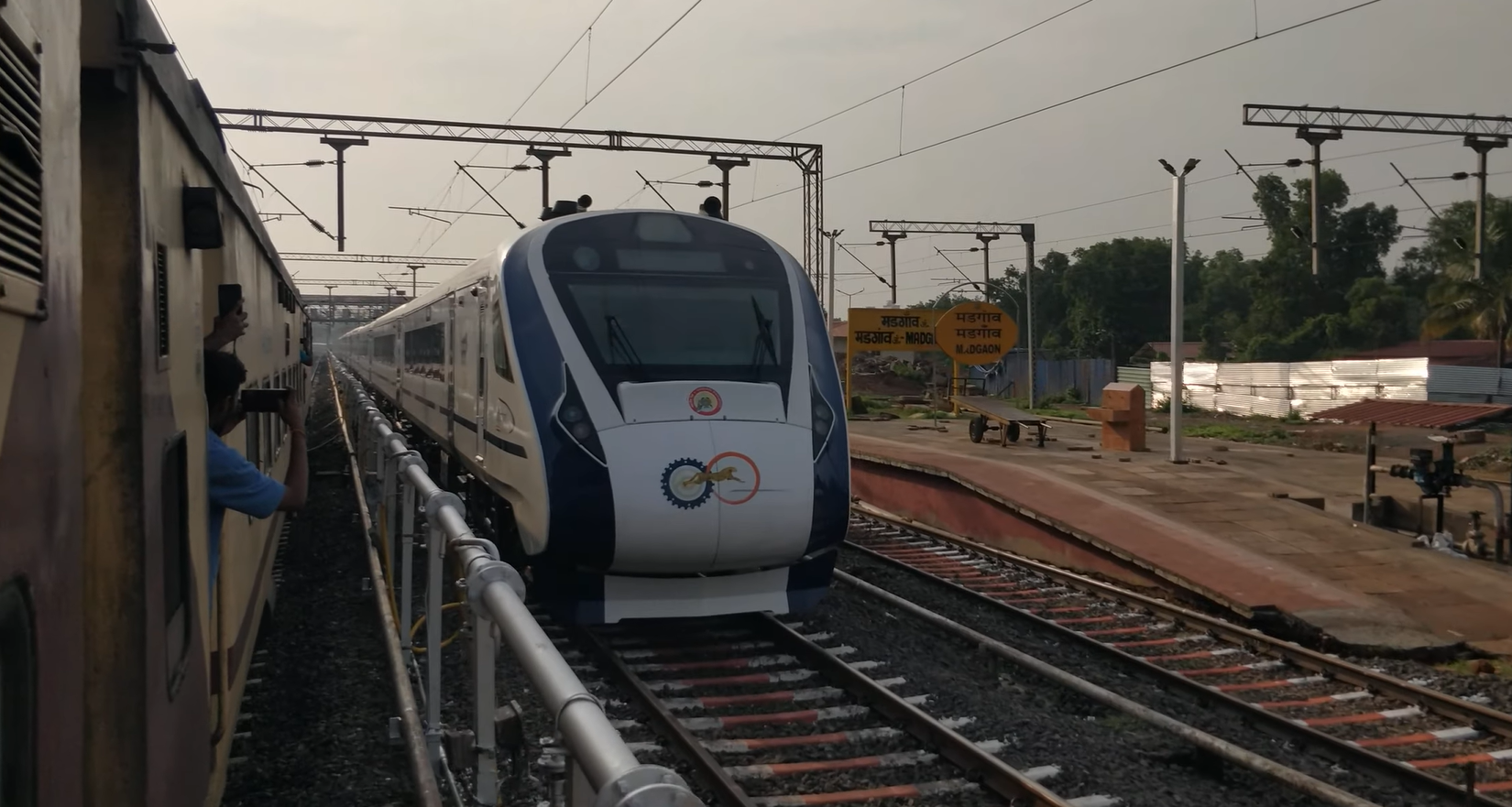
Madgaon Mumbai CSMT VB Express train on standby
