= Mangaluru Central–Madgaon Vande Bharat Express =

Mini Vande Bharat Express train route in India

Mangaluru Central - Madgaon Junction Vande Bharat Express
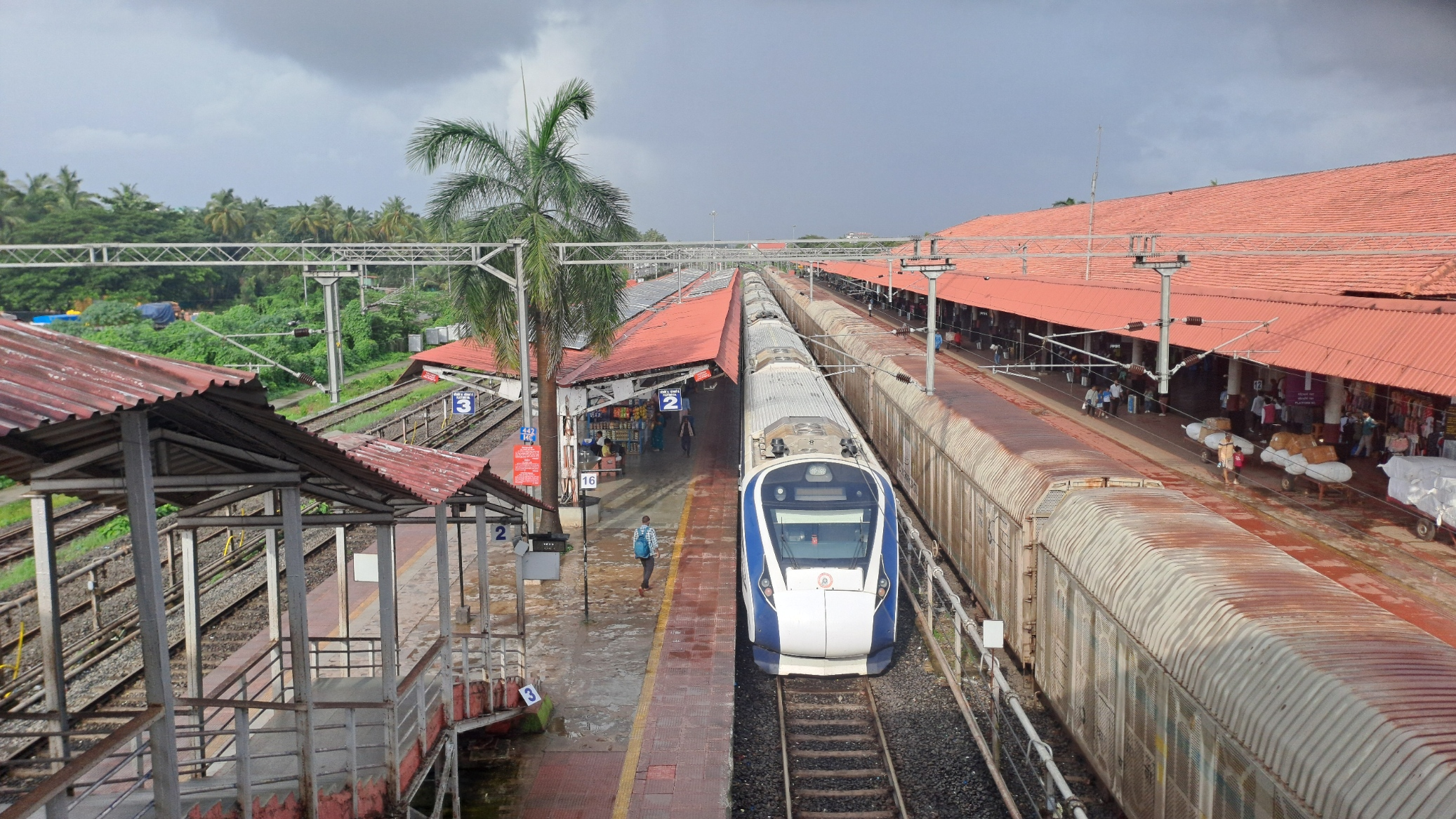

Overview
- Service type: Vande Bharat Express
- Locale: Karnataka and Goa
- First service: 30 December 2023 (inaugural); 31 December 2023; 2 years ago (commercial)
- Last service: 13 November 2026; 3 days ago
- Current operator: South Western Railways (SWR)

Route
- Termini: Mangalore Central (MAQ); Madgaon Junction (MAO)
- Stops: 2
- Distance travelled: 670 km (416 mi)
- Average journey time: 04 hrs 35 mins
- Service frequency: Six days a week (Note: Except Thursdays)
- Train number: 26657 / 26658
- Lines used: Shoranur–Mangalore section Mangalore–Madgaon line

On-board services
- Classes: AC Chair Car, AC Executive Chair Car
- Seating arrangements: Airline style; rotatable seats
- Sleeping arrangements: No
- Catering facilities: On-board catering
- Observation facilities: Large windows in all coaches
- Entertainment facilities: On-board WiFi; infotainment system; electric outlets; reading light; seat pockets; bottle holder; tray table
- Baggage facilities: Overhead racks
- Other facilities: Kavach

Technical
- Rolling stock: Mini Vande Bharat 2.0
- Track gauge: Indian gauge 1,676 mm (5 ft 6 in) broad gauge
- Electrification: 25 kV 50 Hz AC overhead line
- Operating speed: 52 km/h (32 mph) (avg.)
- Average length: 192 metres (630 ft) (08 coaches)
- Track owner: Indian Railways
- Rake maintenance: Mangaluru Ctrl (MAQ)

The 26657/26658 Mangaluru Central - Madgaon Vande Bharat Express was India's 40th Vande Bharat Express train, connecting the industrial port city of Mangalore in western Karnataka with Madgaon, a major city in the state of Goa. This was the fastest train between Mangaluru to Madgaon. It was extended up to Yesvantpur (Bengaluru) as 26655/26656 train number, taking time approx 10-13 hours which commercially started on 15 November 2026.

This express train performed trial runs on 26 December 2023, starting from Mangalore Central around 08:30hrs, and reaching Madgaon Junction around 13:45hrs. It departed from Madgaon at 18:10hrs and reached Mangalore Central at 22:45hrs.

This express train was inaugurated on 30 December 2023 by Prime Minister Narendra Modi via video conferencing from Ayodhya Dham Junction.

== Overview ==
This train is operated by Indian Railways, connecting Mangaluru Ctrl, Udupi, Karwar and Madgaon Jn. It is currently operated with train numbers 26657/26658 six days a week.

== Rakes ==
This is the thirty-eighth second generation and twenty-fourth Mini Vande Bharat 2.0 Express train which was designed and manufactured by the Integral Coach Factory at Perambur, Chennai under the Make in India Initiative.

== Service ==
The 26657/26658 Mangaluru Ctrl - Madgaon Jn Vande Bharat Express operates six days a week except Thursdays, covering a distance of 319 km (198 mi) in a travel time of 5 hours with an average speed of 56 km/h (35 mph). The service has two intermediate stops. The maximum permissible speed is 120 km/h (75 mph).

The Madgaon – Mangaluru Central Vande Bharat Express (20645/20646) will be permanently discontinued on 15 November 2026

== See also ==
- Vande Bharat Express
- Tejas Express
- Gatimaan Express
- Mangalore Central railway station
- Madgaon Junction railway station
- Karwar railway station
- Udupi railway station
