= Madgaon–Ernakulam Superfast Express =

Superfast Express train in India

Madgaon - Ernakulam Superfast Express
Overview
- Service type: Superfast Express
- First service: 28 December 2009; 16 years ago
- Current operator: Konkan Railway

Route
- Termini: Madgaon Junction (MAO); Ernakulam Junction (ERS)
- Stops: 9
- Distance travelled: 729 km (453 mi)
- Average journey time: 14 hours 20 minutes
- Service frequency: O Weekly
- Train number: 10215/10216

On-board services
- Classes: Second Class sitting, AC 3 Tier, AC 2 Tier, AC 1st class, Sleeper,
- Seating arrangements: Yes
- Sleeping arrangements: Yes
- Catering facilities: No
- Entertainment facilities: No

Technical
- Rolling stock: 2
- Track gauge: 1,676 mm (5 ft 6 in)
- Operating speed: 53 km/h (33 mph)

Madgaon - Ernakulam Superfast Express is a Superfast train of the Indian Railways connecting Madgaon Junction in Goa and Ernakulam junction of Kerala. It is currently being operated with 10215/10216 train numbers on once a week basis.

== Service ==
The 10215/Madgaon - Ernakulam Weekly SF Express has an average speed of 51 km/h and covers 729 km in 14 hrs 20 mins. 10216/Ernakulam - Madgaon Weekly SF Express has an average speed of 53 km/h and covers 729 km in 13 hrs 20 mins.

== Route and halts ==
- Madgaon Junction
- Karwar
- Bhatkal
- Udupi
- Mangaluru Junction
- Kasaragod
- Kannur
- Kozhikode
- Tirur
- Shoranur Junction
- Thrissur
- Aluva
- Ernakulam Junction

== Traction ==
Both trains are hauled by a Vadodara Electric Loco Shed or Ludhiana Diesel Loco Shed based Indian locomotive class WAP-7 electric locomotive.

== See also ==
- Konkan Railway
- Goa Sampark Kranti Express
- Madgaon railway station
- Ernakulam railway station
