= Kerala Sampark Kranti Express =

Train in India

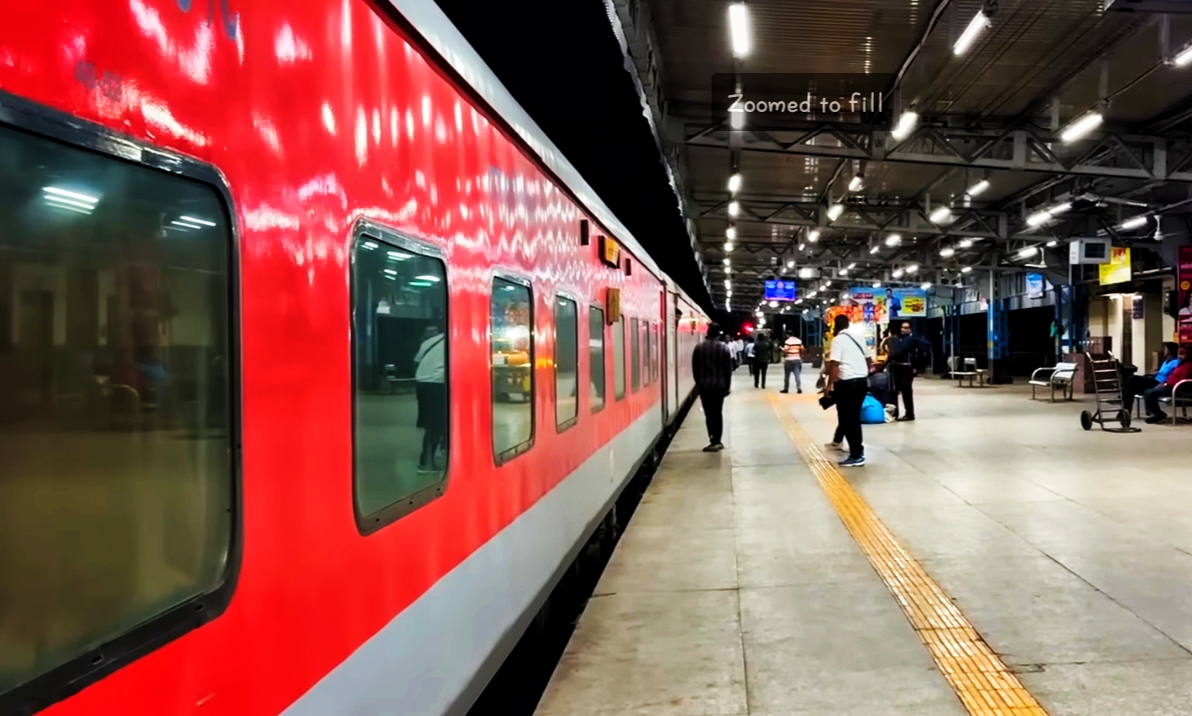
- Kerala Sampark Kranti Express at Ratlam Jn.

Overview
- Service type: Sampark Kranti Express
- Locale: Punjab, Haryana, Delhi, Uttar Pradesh, Rajasthan, Madhya Pradesh, Gujarat, Maharashtra, Goa, Karnataka & Kerala
- First service: 30 March 2005; 21 years ago
- Current operator: Northern Railway

Route
- Termini: Chandigarh (CDG); Thiruvananthapuram North (TVCN)
- Stops: 23
- Distance travelled: 3,090 km (1,920 mi)
- Average journey time: 48 hrs 40 mins
- Service frequency: Bi-Weekly
- Train number: 12217 / 12218

On-board services
- Classes: AC First Class, AC 2 Tier, AC 3 Tier, Sleeper Class, General Unreserved
- Seating arrangements: Yes
- Sleeping arrangements: Yes
- Catering facilities: Available
- Observation facilities: Large windows
- Baggage facilities: Available
- Other facilities: Below the seats

Technical
- Rolling stock: LHB coach
- Track gauge: 1,676 mm (5 ft 6 in)
- Operating speed: 61 km/h (38 mph) average including halts.
Route map
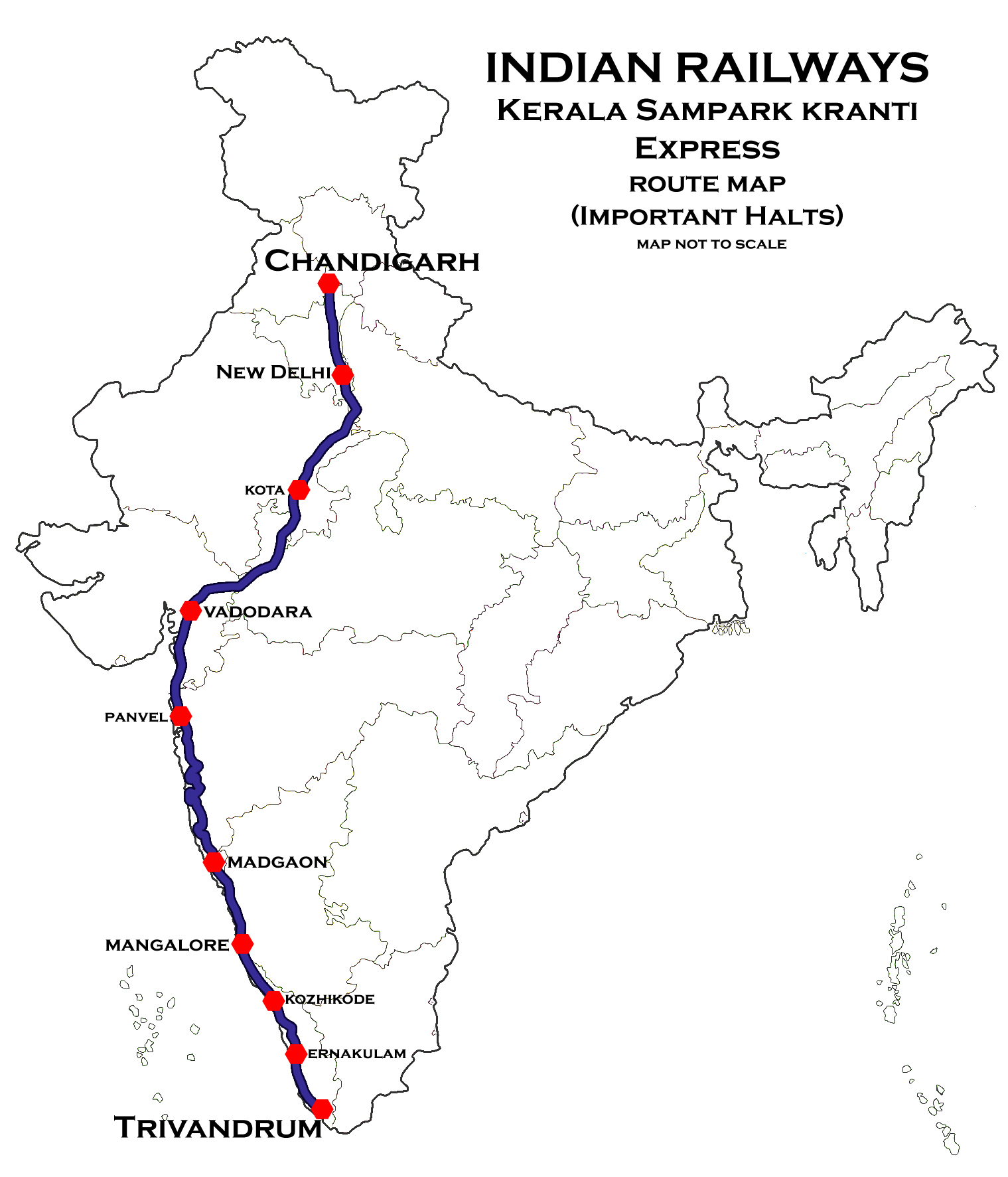
- Kerala Sampark Kranti SF Express route map

The 12217 / 12218 Kerala Sampark Kranti Express is a superfast express train service among Sampark Kranti Express category that runs between Thiruvananthapuram North in Thiruvananthapuram, the capital city of the state of Kerala and Chandigarh the capital city of Haryana & Punjab. It is the longest-running Sampark Kranti express train which covers almost 3417 km in one way run. It is the only direct train from Kerala to Punjab that runs on bi-weekly basis.

== Route and halts ==
- Chandigarh Junction
- Ambala Cantonment Junction
- New Delhi
- Hazrat Nizamuddin
- Kota Junction
- Ratlam Junction
- Vadodara Junction
- Surat
- Vasai Road
- Panvel
- Ratnagiri
- Madgaon Junction
- Udupi
- Mangaluru Junction
- Kasaragod
- Kannur
- Kozhikode
- Shoranur Junction
- Thrissur
- Ernakulam Junction
- Alappuzha
- Kayamkulam Junction
- Kollam Junction
- Thiruvananthapuram

== Coach composition ==
12217/18 Kochuveli–Chandigarh–Kochuveli Kerala Sampark Kranti Superfast Express has modern LHB coach. It has 24 LHB coach.

- 1 AC First Cum AC Two Tier
- 1 AC Two Tier
- 4 AC Three Tier
- 2 AC Three Tier Economy
- 1 Pantry Car
- 9 Sleeper class
- 4 General Unreserved
- 2 End-on Generator coaches (EOG)

Loco	1	2	3	4	5	6	7	8	9	10	11	12	13	14	15	16	17	18	19	20	21	22	23	24
	EOG	UR	UR	S1	S2	S3	S4	S5	S6	S7	S8	S9	PC	M2	M1	B1	B2	B3	B4	A1	HA1	UR	UR	EOG

(Coach Position of 12218 Chandigarh Thiruvananthapuram Kerala Sampark kranthi Superfast Express)

No rake sharing. Two dedicated LHB rakes.

== Traction ==
As the route is fully electrified, both trains are hauled by a Erode Loco Shed / Royapuram Loco Shed-based WAP-7 electric locomotive from end to end.

== See also ==
- Sampark Kranti Express
