= Thiruvananthapuram North–Lokmanya Tilak Terminus Garib Rath Express =

Express train in India

Thiruvananthapuram North - Lokmanya Tilak Terminus Garib Rath Superfast Express
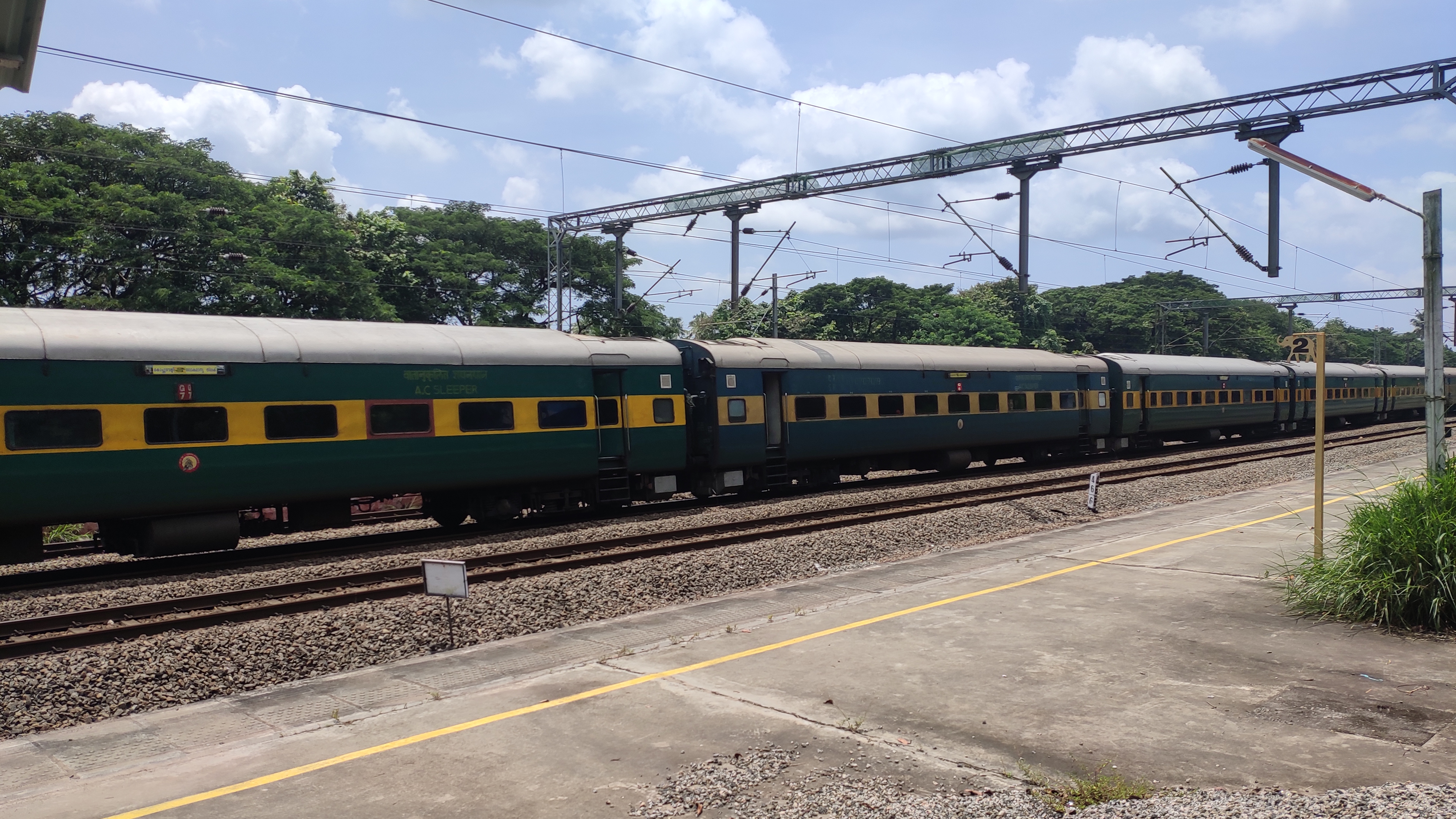

Overview
- Service type: Garib Rath
- First service: January 31, 2008; 18 years ago
- Current operator: Southern Railway zone
- Ridership: Southern Railway Thiruvananthapuram Division

Route
- Termini: Thiruvananthapuram North (TVCN); Lokmanya Tilak Terminus (LTT)
- Stops: 22
- Distance travelled: 1,812 km (1,126 mi)
- Average journey time: 30 hours 0 minutes (approx.)
- Service frequency: Bi-weekly
- Train number: 12202 / 12201

On-board services
- Classes: AC 3 Tier Economy, AC Chair Car
- Seating arrangements: Yes
- Sleeping arrangements: Yes
- Auto-rack arrangements: Yes
- Catering facilities: No Pantry car
- Observation facilities: yes
- Entertainment facilities: yes
- Baggage facilities: yes

Technical
- Rolling stock: Standard Indian Railways LHB coach
- Track gauge: 1,676 mm (5 ft 6 in)
- Electrification: yes
- Operating speed: Average: 50 km/h (31 mph); Maximum: 110 km/h (68 mph)

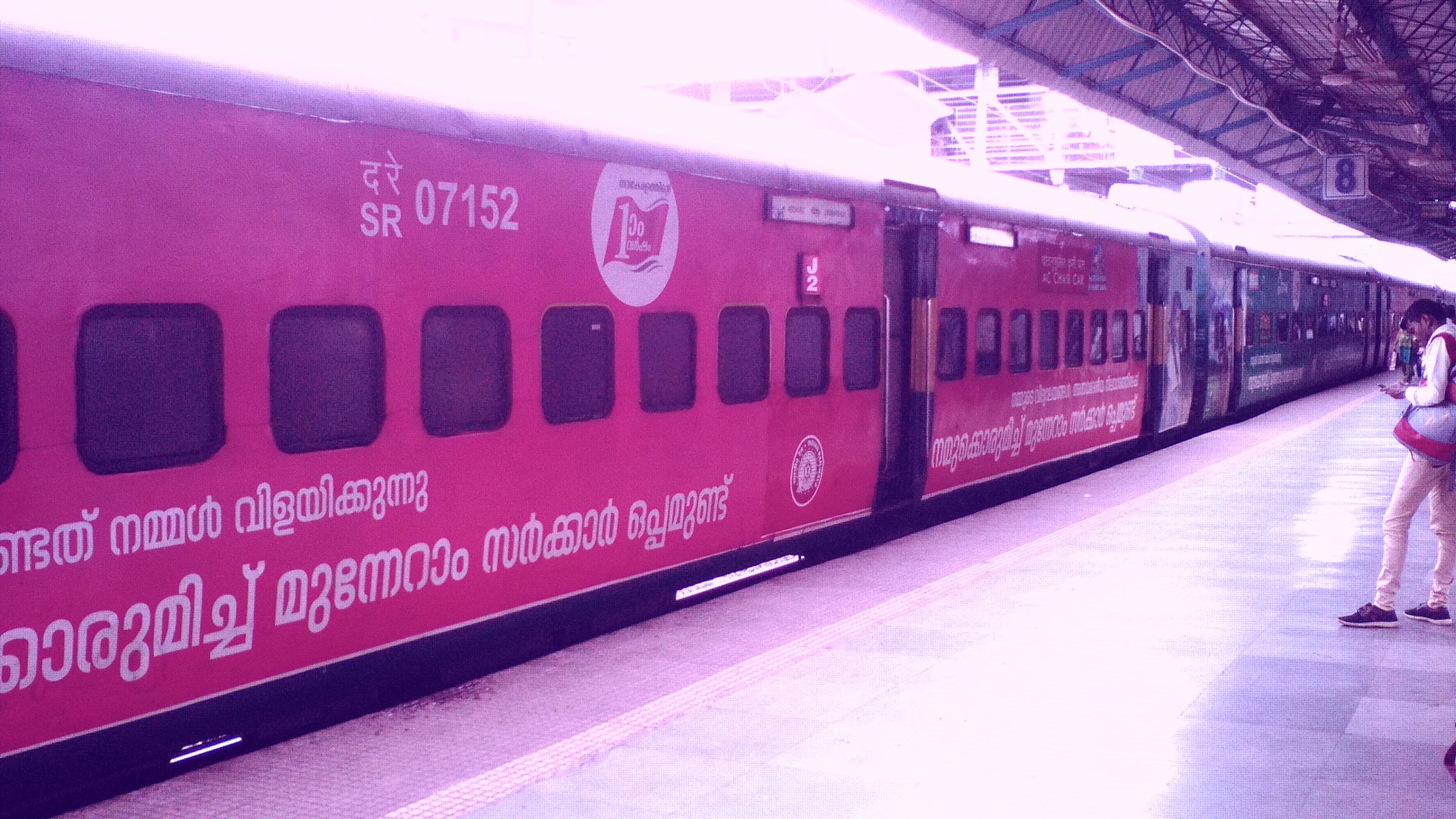
AC Chair Car coach of Garib Rath Express

Thiruvananthapuram North – Lokmanya Tilak Terminus Garib Rath Express is a Superfast Express express train of the Garib Rath Express category belonging to Indian Railways - Southern Railway zone that runs between Thiruvananthapuram North and Lokmanya Tilak Terminus in India.

== Service ==
The 12202 / 01 Thiruvananthapuram North Lokmanya Tilak Terminus Garib Rath Express covers the distance of 1812 kilometres in 26 hours 35 mins as 12202 Thiruvananthapuram North Lokmanya Tilak Terminus Garib Rath Express& in 27 hours 40 mins as 12201 Lokmanya Tilak Terminus Thiruvananthapuram North Garib Rath Express.

During Monsoon, as this train crosses in Konkan Railway route, there are speed restrictions in this route. It covers the distance of 1812 kilometres in 30 hours 55 mins as 12202 Thiruvananthapuram North Lokmanya Tilak Terminus Garib Rath Express& in 30 hours as 12201 Lokmanya Tilak Terminus Thiruvananthapuram North Garib Rath Express. However, monsoon time table refers w.e.f 10 June to 31 October .

The speed calculation however does not take into account the inflation of distance (approximately 40%) on the Konkan Railway network.

As the average speed of the train is above 55 km/h (34 mph), as per Indian Railways rules, its fare includes a superfast surcharge.

== Coaches ==
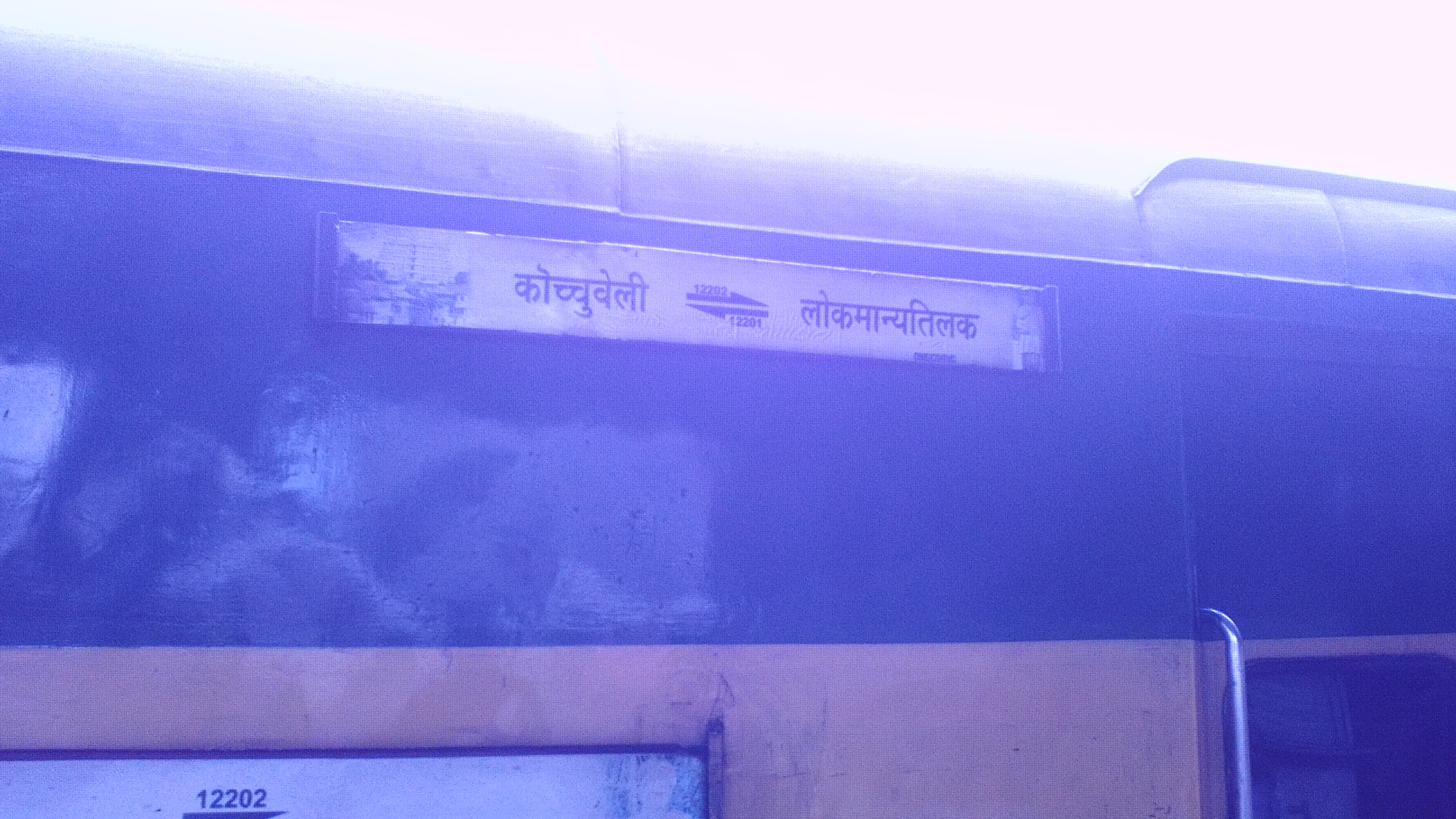
Coachboard of kochuveli lokmanya tilak terminus garib rath express

The 12202 / 01 Thiruvananthapuram North Lokmanya Tilak Terminus Garib Rath Express presently has 16 AC 3 tier Economy & 3 AC Chair Car coaches.

It does not have a Pantry car coach.

As is customary with most train services in India, Coach Composition may be amended at the discretion of Indian Railways depending on demand.

Loco	1	2	3	4	5	6	7	8	9	10	11	12	13	14	15	16	17	18	19	20	21
WAP 4	EOG	J3	J2	J1	G16	G15	G14	G13	G12	G11	G10	G9	G8	G7	G6	G5	G4	G3	G2	G1	EOG

- EOG Consists of Generator Van
- J Consists of AC Second Sitting (Chair Car)
- G Consists of AC 3 Tier Economy

== Routeing ==
The train runs from Thiruvananthapuram North via Kollam Junction, Kayamkulam Junction, Chengannur, Tiruvalla, Changanassery, Kottayam, Ernakulam Town, Thrissur, Shoranur Junction, Tirur, Kozhikode, Kannur, Kasaragod, Mangalore Junction, Udupi, Byndoor Mookambika Road, Ankola, Karwar, Madgaon Junction, Ratngiri, Panvel, Thane to Lokmanya Tilak Terminus.

== Traction ==
As route is fully electrified, it is hauled by an WAP 5 of Vadodara Electric Loco shed or WAP 7 From Erode Electric Loco shed electric locomotive from Mumbai LTT to Kochuveli( Trivandrum North ) and vice versa.

== See also ==
- List of trains run by Indian Railways
- Duronto Express
