= Thiruvananthapuram North–Indore Weekly Express =

Train in India

Overview
- Service type: Express
- Locale: Kerala, Karnataka, Goa, Maharashtra, Gujarat & Madhya Pradesh
- First service: 1 July 2016; 10 years ago
- Current operator: Western Railway

Route
- Termini: Thiruvananthapuram North (TVCN); Indore (INDB)
- Stops: 31
- Distance travelled: 2,287 km (1,421 mi)
- Average journey time: 45 hours 15 minutes
- Service frequency: Weekly (Note: Runs one day in a week for every direction.)
- Train number: 20931 / 20932

On-board services
- Classes: AC 2 Tier, AC 3 Tier, Sleeper Class, General Unreserved
- Seating arrangements: Yes
- Sleeping arrangements: Yes
- Catering facilities: Available
- Observation facilities: Large windows
- Baggage facilities: Available

Technical
- Rolling stock: LHB coach
- Track gauge: 1,676 mm (5 ft 6 in)
- Operating speed: 130 km/h (81 mph) maximum, 51 km/h (32 mph) average with halts.
Route map
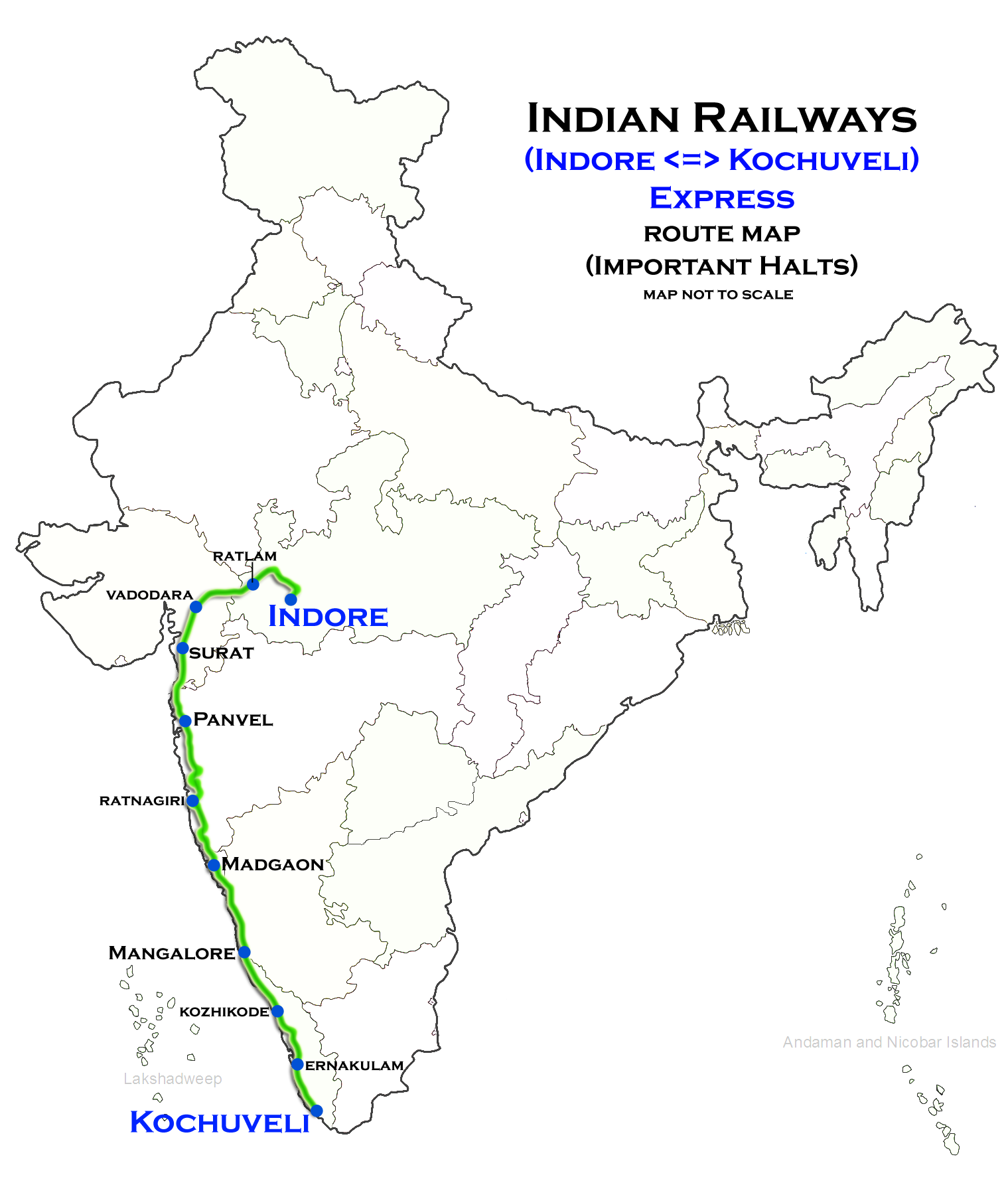

The 20931 / 20932 Thiruvananthapuram North–Indore Weekly Express is a weekly express train of the Indian Railways,running between Thiruvananthapuram North railway station, the capital city of Kerala and Indore Junction BG railway station of Indore, the largest city and commercial capital of Madhya Pradesh. It is currently being operated with 20931/20932 train numbers on a weekly basis.

== Coach composition ==
The train has standard LHB rakes with max speed of 130 km/h. The train consists of 21 coaches:

- 2 AC II Tier
- 2 AC Three tier Economy
- 5 AC III Tier
- 8 Sleeper class
- 4 General Unreserved
- 1 Pantry car
- 2 End On Generator

== Service ==
- 20931/Thiruvananthapuram North–Indore Weekly Express has an average speed of 51 km/h and covers 2287 km in 45 hrs 15 mins.
- 20932/Indore–Thiruvananthapuram North Weekly Express has an average speed of 50 km/h and covers 2287 km in 45 hrs 40 mins.

== Route and halts ==
The important halts of the train are:

- Thiruvananthapuram North
- Kollam Junction
- Kayamkulam Junction
- Alappuzha
- Ernakulam Junction
- Thrissur
- Shoranur Junction
- Kozhikode
- Kannur
- Kasaragod
- Mangalore Junction
- Udupi
- Karwar
- Madgaon Junction
- Ratnagiri
- Chiplun
- Roha
- Panvel
- Vasai Road
- Boisar
- Vapi
- Surat
- Vadodara Junction
- Godhra Junction
- Dahod
- Ratlam Junction
- Nagda Junction
- Ujjain Junction
- Indore Junction

== Schedule ==
Train number	Station code	Departure station	Departure time	Departure day	Arrival station	Arrival time	Arrival day
20931	KCVL	Thiruvananthapuram North	11:00 AM	Fri	Indore Junction	08:15 AM	Sun
20932	INDB	Indore Junction	21:00 PM	Tue	Thiruvananthapuram North	18:40 PM	Thu

== Traction ==
earlier was WDP-4B. Both trains are hauled by a Vadodara Loco Shed-based WAP-7 electric locomotive from Kochuveli to Indore and vice versa.

== See also ==
- Konkan Railways
- Ahilyanagari Express
- Kochuveli railway station
