= Mumbai CSMT–Madgaon Vande Bharat Express =

Mini Vande Bharat Express train route in India

Mumbai CSMT - Madgaon Junction Vande Bharat Express
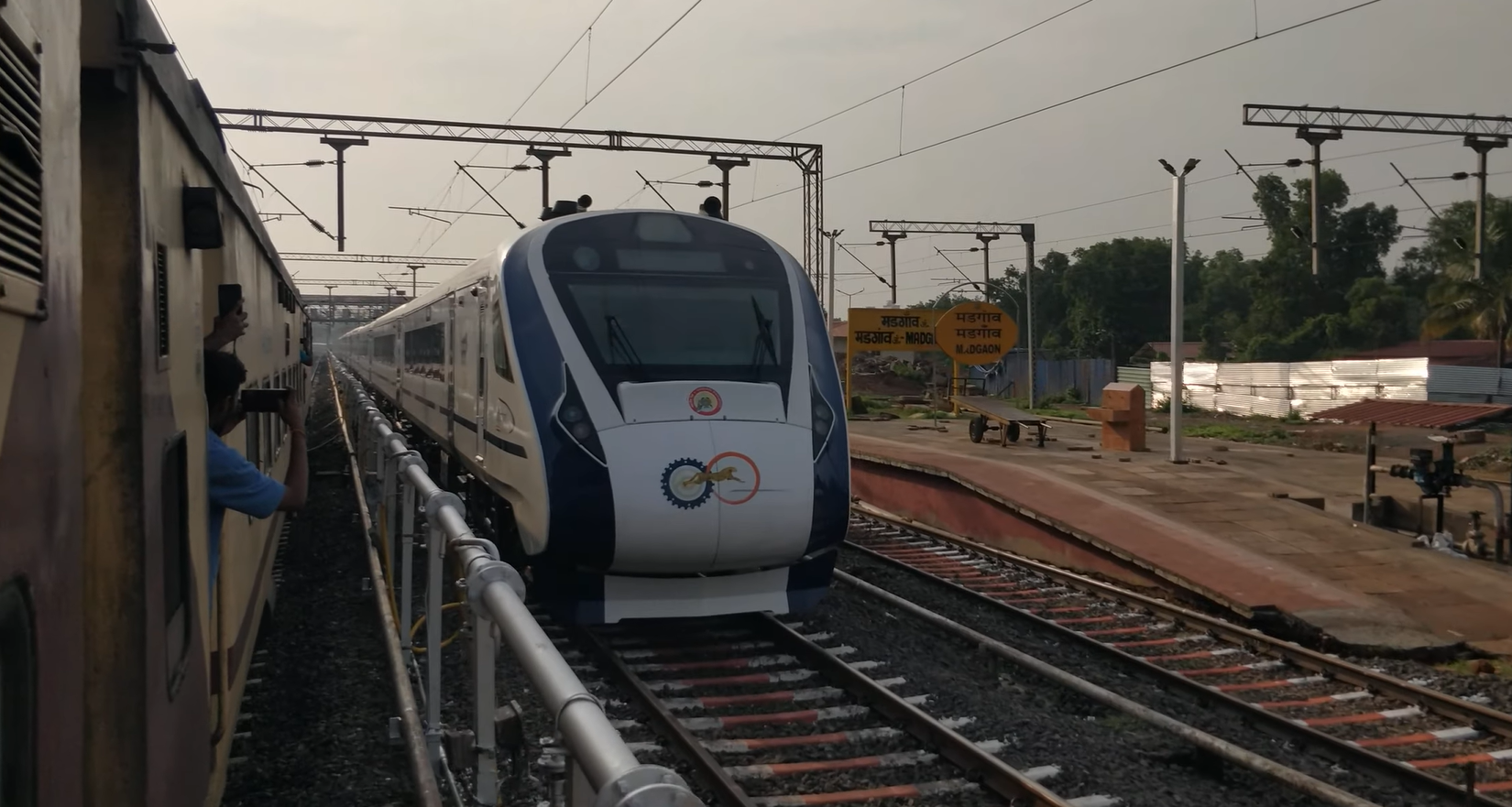
- This Mini Vande Bharat Express on standby at Madgaon Junction

Overview
- Service type: Vande Bharat Express
- Locale: Maharashtra and Goa
- First service: 27 June 2023 (Inaugural run); 28 June 2023; 3 years ago (Commercial run)
- Current operator: Central Railways (CR)

Route
- Termini: Mumbai CSMT (CSMT); Madgaon Junction (MAO)
- Stops: 7
- Distance travelled: 581 km (361 mi)
- Average journey time: 07 hrs 45 mins (Non-Monsoon); 10 hrs 05 mins (Monsoon)
- Service frequency: Six days a week (Note: Except Fridays)
- Train number: 22229 / 22230
- Lines used: Central Line (till Diva Jn.); Vasai Road–Roha line; Roha–Madgaon line

On-board services
- Classes: AC Chair Car, AC Executive Chair Car
- Seating arrangements: Airline style; Rotatable seats
- Sleeping arrangements: No
- Catering facilities: On-board catering
- Observation facilities: Large windows in all coaches
- Entertainment facilities: On-board WiFi; Infotainment System; Electric outlets; Reading light; Seat Pockets; Bottle Holder; Tray Table
- Baggage facilities: Overhead racks
- Other facilities: Kavach

Technical
- Rolling stock: Mini Vande Bharat 2.0
- Track gauge: Indian gauge 1,676 mm (5 ft 6 in) broad gauge
- Electrification: 25 kV 50 Hz AC Overhead line
- Operating speed: 75 km/h (47 mph) (Non-Monsoon Avg.); 58 km/h (36 mph) (Monsoon Avg.)
- Average length: 192 metres (630 ft) (08 coaches)
- Track owner: Indian Railways
- Rake maintenance: Wadi Bunder Coaching Yard (Mumbai)

The 22229/22230 Mumbai CSMT - Madgaon Jn Vande Bharat Express is India's 19th Vande Bharat Express train and the first Vande Bharat Express serving the Konkan Railways of India, connecting the states of Maharashtra and the Konkan state Goa. It was expected to be inaugurated on 3 June 2023 but was delayed due to the 2023 Odisha train collision. This train was flagged off by Prime Minister Narendra Modi on 27 June 2023 via video conference from Rani Kamalapati railway station.

== Overview ==
The train is operated by Indian Railways, connecting Mumbai's CSMT, Dadar, Thane, Panvel, Khed, Ratnagiri, Kankavli, Thivim and Goa's Madgaon Junction. It will be operated with train numbers 22229/22230 on a 6 days a week basis.

== Rakes ==
It is the seventeenth 2nd Generation and the fifth Mini Vande Bharat 2.0 Express train which was designed and manufactured by the Integral Coach Factory at Perambur, Chennai under the Make in India Initiative.

== Service ==
The 22229/22230 Mumbai CSM Trm - Madgaon Jn Vande Bharat Express operates on Mon, Wed, Fri, covering a distance of 581 km (361 mi) in a travel time of 10 hours with an average speed of 55 km/h (34 mph). The service has 7 intermediate stops. The Maximum Permissible Speed is 130 km/h (81 mph).

== See also ==
- Vande Bharat Express
- Gatimaan Express
- Tejas Express
- Mumbai CSMT - Madgaon Tejas Express
- Chhatrapati Shivaji Terminus
- Madgaon Junction railway station
