= Mandovi Express =

Train in India

Overview
- Service type: Express
- Locale: Maharashtra & Goa
- First service: 7 June 1999; 26 years ago
- Current operator: Konkan Railway

Route
- Termini: CSMT Mumbai (CSMT); Madgaon Junction (MAO)
- Stops: 18
- Distance travelled: 581 km (361 mi)
- Average journey time: 11hrs 50mins
- Service frequency: Daily
- Train number: 10103 / 10104

On-board services
- Classes: AC First, AC 2 Tier Tier, AC 3 Tier, AC 3 Tier Economy, Sleeper Class, General Unreserved
- Seating arrangements: Yes
- Sleeping arrangements: No
- Auto-rack arrangements: Overhead racks
- Catering facilities: Available
- Observation facilities: Large windows
- Baggage facilities: Available
- Other facilities: Below the seats

Technical
- Rolling stock: LHB coach
- Track gauge: Broad Gauge
- Operating speed: 49 km/h (30 mph) average including halts.

The 10103 / 10104 Mandovi Express is a train which operates between Chhatrapati Shivaji Maharaj Terminus and Madgaon Junction, the main railway station in Goa, and is currently operated by the Central Railway and the Konkan Railway. This train is named after the Mandovi River. This train is also colloquially known as "The Food Queen of Konkan Railways," by rail fans.

== Background ==
Before the establishment of the Konkan Railway, a train used to run between Vasco and Miraj as the Vasco-Miraj MG train. It was then diverted and made to run from Mumbai to Madgaon and renamed Mandovi Express by then Railway Minister Nitish Kumar. It is called foodie train by rail fans because in this train many types of food is delivered from breakfast to dinner.

== Service ==
It runs daily with a total travel time of 14 hours and 35 minutes. It has 18 stops on its route. It covers a distance of 580 kilometres (360 mi).

== Routes ==
The Mandovi Express (10103 ) runs from Chhatrapati Shivaji Maharaj Terminus (CSMT) with stoppages at- Dadar Central, Thane, Panvel Junction, Mangaon, Khed, Chiplun, Sangameshwar Road, Ratnagiri, Adavali, Rajapur Road, Vaibhavwadi Road, Kankavali, Sindhudurg, Kudal, Sawantwadi Road, Pernem, Thivim, Karmali, Madgaon Junction

Once it reaches Madgaon Junction, it rests for the day and then originate as 10104 Mandovi express the next day at Madgaon (Margao) and ends at CSMT; it will take the same stoppage route.

The Mandovi Express (10104) originates daily from Madgaon and ends at CSMT. After arriving at CSMT, the train then Travels as 20111 KONKAN KANYA SF EXPRESS.(As it shares rakes with Konkan Kanya SF express)

== Locomotive ==
As the route is fully electrified, it is hauled by a Bhusawal Loco Shed based WAP-4 / WAG-5 or Kalyan Loco Shed based WAP-7 electric locomotive from end to end. Before electrification, Mandovi Express was hauled by EMD locomotives especially the WDP-4D locomotive from Kalyan or Pune Loco Shed (usually the latter).

=== Coach composition ===
Mandovi Express runs with LHB coaches having 1 AC FIRST CUM AC TWO TIER, 1 AC TWO TIER, 1 PANTRY CAR, 4 AC THREE TIER, 2 AC 3 TIER ECONOMY, 7 Sleeper and 4 second seating (unreserved) two at front and others are at the end of the train, 1 EOG and 1 SLR coach.

== Incident ==
On 7 Oct 2013, Mandovi Express derailed at Khed which lies in Ratnagiri district. This incident happened when the train was running slowly and going towards Khed railway station, so no casualties reported.

== Sister trains ==
- Lokmanya Tilak Terminus–Karmali AC Superfast Express
- Dadar–Madgaon Jan Shatabdi Express
- Konkan Kanya Express
- Mumbai CSMT–Madgaon Tejas Express
- Lokmanya Tilak Terminus–Madgaon AC Double Decker Express
- Mumbai CSMT- Madgaon Vande Bharat Express
