= Lokmanya Tilak Terminus–Ernakulam Duronto Express =

Indian train

Ernakulam–Mumbai LTT Duronto Express
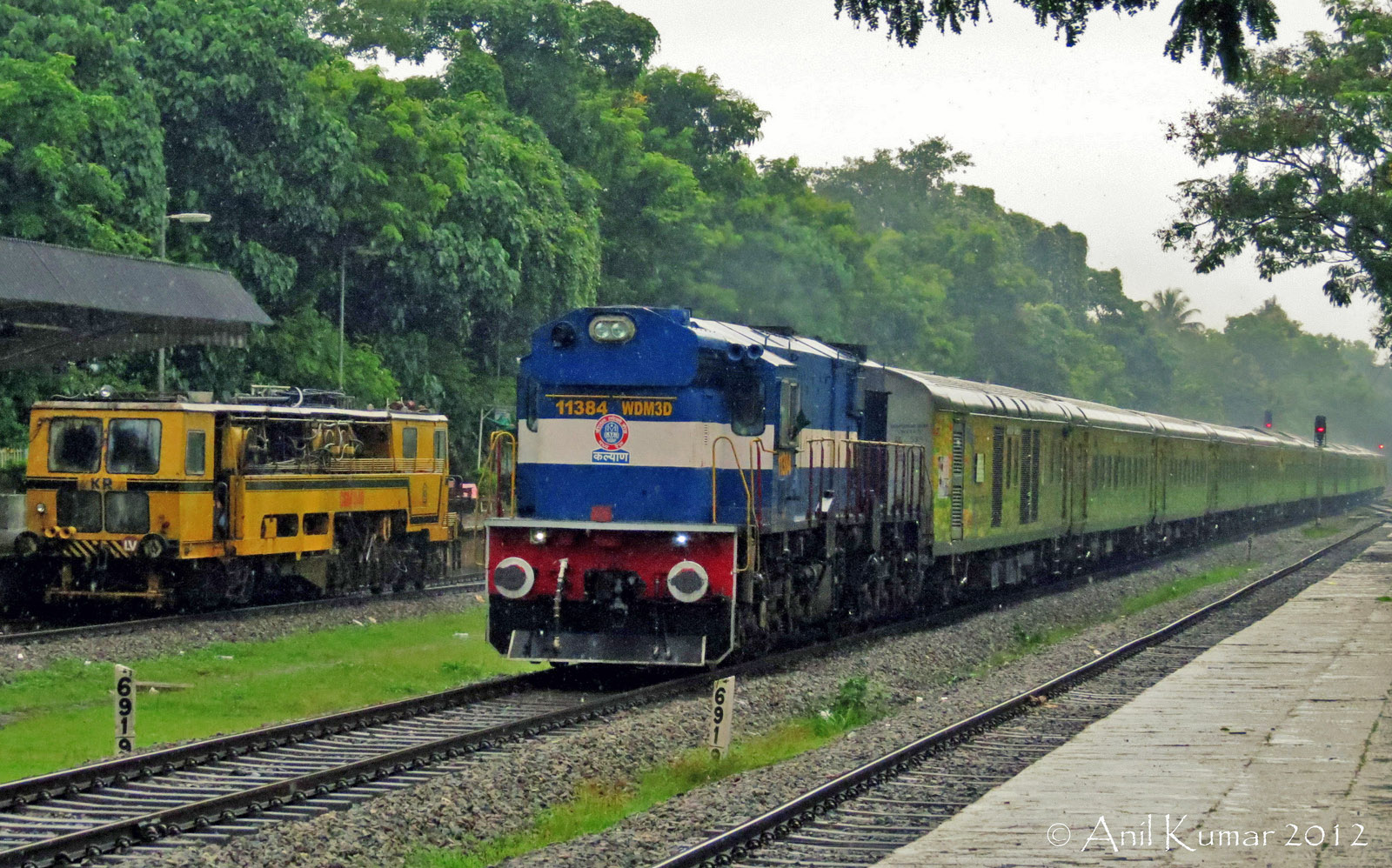
- Mumbai LTT Ernakulam Duronto Superfast Express

Overview
- Service type: Duronto Express
- Locale: Maharashtra, Goa, Karnataka and Kerala
- First service: 2010
- Current operator: Central Railways

Route
- Termini: Ernakulam Junction; Lokmanya Tilak Terminus, Mumbai
- Stops: 15
- Distance travelled: 1,331 km (827 mi)
- Average journey time: 20 hours, 45 minutes
- Service frequency: Bi-Weekly
- Train numbers: 12223 Down, 12224 Up

On-board services
- Classes: First AC, Second AC, Third AC, Sleeper
- Seating arrangements: No
- Sleeping arrangements: Yes
- Catering facilities: Yes
- Observation facilities: Large windows
- Entertainment facilities: No
- Baggage facilities: Yes

Technical
- Rolling stock: LHB coach
- Track gauge: Broad – 1,676 mm (5 ft 6 in)
- Electrification: 25kV AC
- Operating speed: 125 km/h (78 mph) (Maximum Speed); 85.0602 km/h (53 mph) (Average Speed), including halts

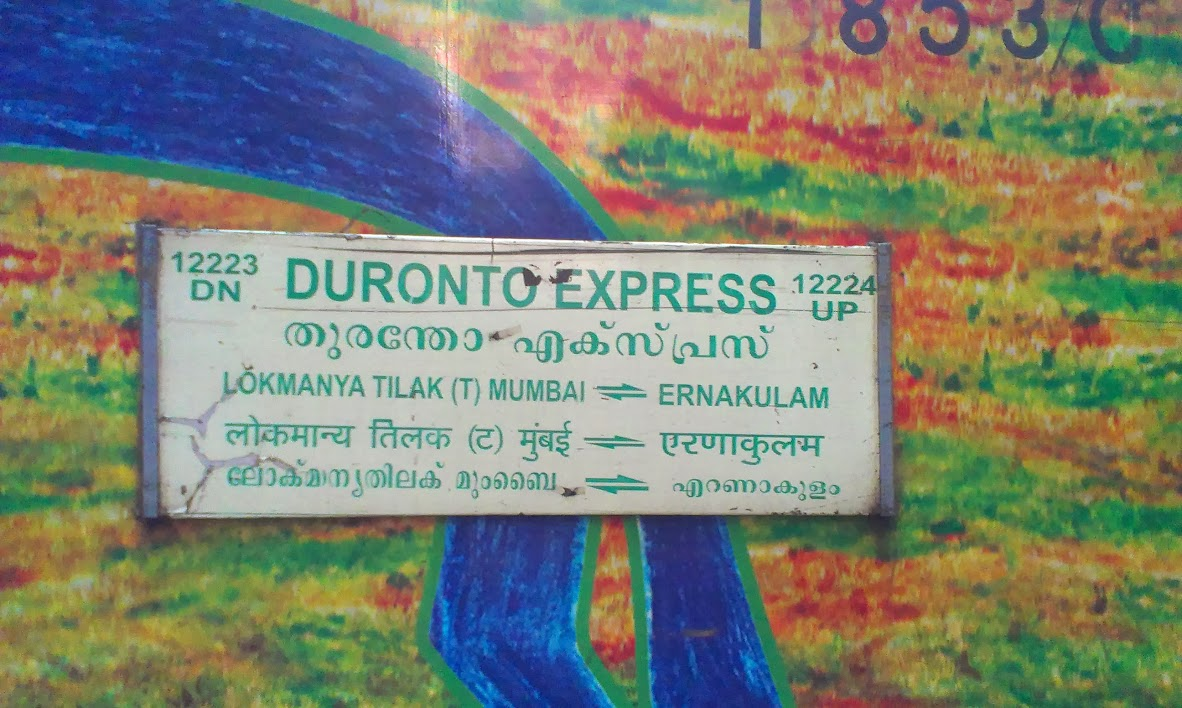
Sign board of Ernakulam–Lokmanya Tilak Duronto

The Ernakulam–Lokmanya Tilak Terminus Duronto Express is a bi-weekly nonstop Duronto Express train between Kochi and Mumbai, running through the scenic Konkan Railway route. It is considered to be the 2nd fastest option for train connectivity between Kochi and Mumbai.

== History ==
The service of this train started on January 14, 2011 from Lokmanya Tilak Terminus to Ernakulam Junction. This train is a typical Duronto Express. It had no commercial stops in between the starting station and the ending station when introduced. Only technical halts were applied for this train for staff change, cleaning, water filling etc. However, because of low occupancy, all its technical halts except Udupi were converted into commercial halts.

On 3 May 2015, 10 Coaches of Duronto Express derailed near Balli at 6.24 am shortly after departing from Madgaon Junction (MAO). No casualties were reported.

== Routes and halts ==
- Kozhikode (CLT)
- Mangalore Junction (MAJN)
- Udupi (UD) (Technical Halt)
- Madgaon Junction (MAO)
- Ratnagiri (RN)
- Panvel Junction (PNVL)

Ticket booking is not allowed to or from Udupi railway station as it is a technical halt stations.
