= Udupi railway station =

Railway station in Karnataka, India

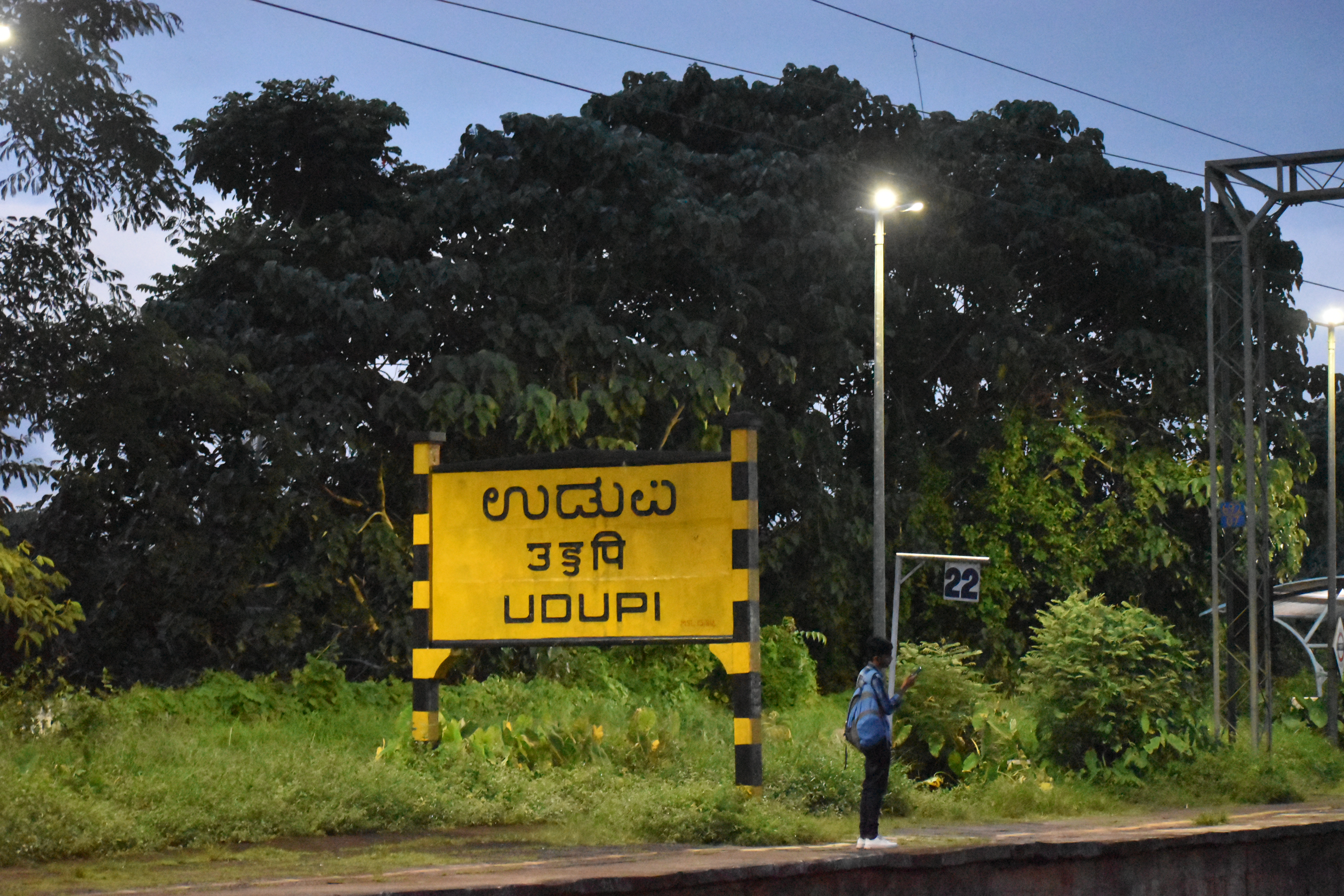

General information
- Location: Udupi Railway Station Marg, Udupi, Karnataka; India
- Coordinates: 13.3361°N 74.7708°E
- Elevation: 108 metres (354 ft)
- System: Regional rail and Light rail station
- Owner: Indian Railways
- Operator: Konkan Railway zone
- Line: Konkan Railway
- Platforms: 2+1 Non functional
- Tracks: 4
- Connections: Auto stand

Construction
- Structure type: Standard (on ground station)
- Parking: Yes
- Cycle facilities: No

Other information
- Status: Functioning
- Station code: UD
- Fare zone: Konkan Railway

Services
Preceding station	Indian Railways	Following station
Barkur towards Roha	Konkan Railway Konkan Railway	Innanje towards Thokur
Route map
Location
- Location within India Location within Karnataka

Udupi railway station is a railway station in Udupi district, Karnataka. Its code is UD. It serves the pilgrims visiting famous Krishna Matha (Krishna Temple) at Udupi and the university town of Manipal, which is 4 kilometres (2.5 mi) south from the station and Udupi. The station consists of two platforms. Most of the platform is not sheltered from the heavy rains that Udupi receives. The Konkan railway route in which trains are pulled by Diesel locomotives (Diesel engines) will now be powered by Electric locomotives after electrification of this route. Konkan railway conducted a trial run of Electric locomotives on 13 January 2020, Monday from Thokur railway station to Udupi railway station. The electric locomotive started from Thokur at 4 p.m. and reached Udupi at 6 p.m. On return journey the electric locomotive reached Thokur at 8 p.m.

== Facilities at Udupi railway station ==
Udupi railway station has a multipurpose stall and refreshment stall on platform 1. It has a restaurant at basement near parking area. Udupi railway station has a fresh up facility which passengers can use to take rest on an hourly basis. The Udupi railway station has cashless facilities to help passengers not carrying cash (currency notes). As a part of initiative to become green, Udupi railway station has installed solar power generation of 7 kW out of station's requirement of 48 kW on 5 June 2016. Udupi railway station has retiring room facility.

== Trains ==
- Mangaluru Central–Madgaon Vande Bharat Express
- Matsyagandha Express
- Hisar–Coimbatore AC Superfast Express
- Kerala Sampark Kranti Express
- Netravati Express
- Thiruvananthapuram Rajdhani Express
- Marusagar Express
- Poorna Express (via Belagavi)
- Pune–Ernakulam Express
- Mangaluru–Madgaon Passenger
- Madgaon–Mangaluru Intercity Express
- Thiruvananthapuram North–Lokmanya Tilak Terminus Garib Rath Express
- Thiruvananthapuram North–Amritsar Weekly Express
- Lokmanya Tilak Terminus–Thiruvananthapuram North Express
- Thiruvananthapuram North−Porbandar Superfast Express
- Thiruvananthapuram North–Bhavnagar Express
- Thiruvananthapuram North–Yog Nagari Rishikesh Superfast Express
- Thiruvananthapuram North–Shri Ganganagar Junction Express
- Thiruvananthapuram North–Indore Weekly Express
- Tirunelveli–Jamnagar Express
- Thiruvananthapuram–Hazrat Nizamuddin Express (via Kottayam)
- Thiruvananthapuram–Hazrat Nizamuddin Express (via Alappuzha)
- Panchaganga Express
- Mumbai CSMT–Mangaluru Junction Superfast Express
- Gandhidham–Nagercoil Express
- Ernakulam–Okha Express
- Mangala Lakshadweep Express
- Thiruvananthapuram–Veraval Express
- Yesvantpur–Karwar Express
- SMVT Bengaluru–Murdeshwar Express
- Dadar–Tirunelveli Express
- Ernakulam–Hazrat Nizamuddin Express
- Madgaon–Ernakulam Superfast Express
