= Konkan Kanya Express =

Train in India

Overview
- Service type: Superfast Express
- Locale: Maharashtra & Goa
- First service: 25 January 1998; 28 years ago
- Current operator: Konkan Railway

Route
- Termini: Mumbai CSMT (CSMT); Madgaon (MAO)
- Stops: 17
- Distance travelled: 580 km (360 mi)
- Average journey time: 10 hours 40 minutes
- Service frequency: Daily
- Train number: 20111 / 20112

On-board services
- Classes: AC First Class, AC 2 Tier, AC 3 Tier, Sleeper Class, General Unreserved
- Seating arrangements: Yes
- Sleeping arrangements: Yes
- Auto-rack arrangements: Overhead racks
- Catering facilities: Available
- Observation facilities: Large windows
- Baggage facilities: Available
- Other facilities: Below the seats

Technical
- Rolling stock: LHB coach
- Track gauge: 1,676 mm (5 ft 6 in)
- Operating speed: 43 km/h (27 mph) average including halts.

The Konkan Kanya Express is a daily superfast express train operated by Indian Railways between Chhatrapati Shivaji Maharaj Terminus in Mumbai, Maharashtra, and Madgaon railway station in Goa, via the Konkan Railway route.

Train 20111 operates from Mumbai CSMT to Madgaon, while train 20112 runs in the reverse direction.

== Background ==
The train's existing Integral Coach Factory (ICF) rakes were replaced with Linke-Hofmann-Busch (LHB) coaches in 2019. The new coaches were introduced from 10 June 2019, with permanent implementation scheduled from 1 September 2019.

== Coach composition ==
The train was upgraded to an LHB rake in June 2019, with a maximum permissible speed (MPS) of 145 km/h. In 2023, the conversion of two sleeper coaches into AC three-tier coaches was proposed. In February 2026, Central Railway announced additional coaches for the train.

The listed coach composition is as follows:

- 1 AC First Class coach
- 2 AC two-tier coaches
- 2 AC three-tier coaches
- 2 AC three-tier economy coaches
- 9 sleeper coaches
- 1 pantry car
- 4 general coaches
- 1 Divyangjan-friendly general coach
- 1 generator car

Locomotive	1	2	3	4	5	6	7	8	9	10	11	12	13	14	15	16	17	18	19	20	21	22	23
	EOG	UR	UR	S1	S2	S3	S4	S5	S6	S7	S8	S9	PC	M2	M1	B2	B1	A2	A1	H1	UR	UR	SLR

Coach positions for train 20111, Konkan Kanya Express. EOG = End-on Generator; UR = Unreserved; PC = Pantry Car; S = Sleeper; M = AC three-tier economy; B = AC three-tier; A = AC two-tier; H = First AC; SLR = Seating-cum-Luggage Rake.

The train shares its rake with the CSMT–Madgaon Mandovi Express. Four dedicated LHB rakes are reported to be used for the services.

== See also ==
- Indian Railways
- Konkan Railway

== Sister Trains ==
- Lokmanya Tilak Terminus - Karmali AC Superfast Express
- CSMT Madgaon Jan Shatabdi Express
- Mandovi Express
- Mumbai CSMT - Karmali Tejas Express
- Mumbai LTT - Madgaon AC Double Decker Express
