= Lokmanya Tilak Terminus–Karmali AC Superfast Express =

Superfast Express express train

Mumbai Lokmanya Tilak Terminus - Karmali AC Superfast Express

Overview
- Service type: AC Express
- First service: 18 December 2014; 11 years ago
- Current operator: Central Railway

Route
- Termini: Lokmanya Tilak Terminus; Karmali
- Stops: 6
- Distance travelled: 693 km (431 mi)
- Average journey time: 11 hours 30 mins
- Service frequency: 1 day a week.
- Train number: 22115 / 22116

On-board services
- Classes: AC 1st Class, AC 2 tier and AC 3 tier
- Seating arrangements: No
- Sleeping arrangements: Yes
- Auto-rack arrangements: No
- Catering facilities: Pantry car attached
- Baggage facilities: Storage space under berth

Technical
- Rolling stock: LHB coach
- Track gauge: 1,676 mm (5 ft 6 in)
- Electrification: Yes
- Operating speed: 140 km/h (87 mph) maximum 71 km/h (44 mph), including halts
- Rake sharing: Rake Sharing with 12293/12294 Allahabad Duronto Express

The 22115 / 16 Lokmanya Tilak Terminus - Karmali AC Superfast Express is a Superfast Express express train of the AC Express series belonging to Indian Railways - Central Railway zone that runs between Lokmanya Tilak Terminus and Karmali in India.

It operates as train number 22115 from Lokmanya Tilak Terminus to Karmali and as train number 22116 in the reverse direction serving the states of Maharashtra & Goa.

== Coaches ==
The 22115 / 16 Lokmanya Tilak Terminus - Karmali AC Superfast Express has 13 AC 3 tier, 3 AC 2 tier, 1 AC 1st Class & 2 End on Generator Coaches. It also carries a Pantry car coach .

As is customary with most train services in India, Coach Composition may be amended at the discretion of Indian Railways depending on demand.

Loco	1	2	3	4	5	6	7	8	9	10	11	12	13	14	15	16	17	18	19	20
	EOG	B13	B12	B11	B10	B9	B8	B7	B6	B5	B4	B3	B2	B1	PC	H1	A3	A2	A1	EOG

- EOG consists of Luggage and Generator Coach
- B consists of AC 3 Tier Coach
- PC consists of Pantry Car Coach
- A consists of AC 2 Tier Coach
- H consists of First Class AC Coach

== Service ==
The 22115 Lokmanya Tilak Terminus - Karmali AC Superfast Express covers the distance of 693 km (431 mi) in 09 hours 50 mins (69.88 km/h) and in 09 hours 30 mins as 22116 Karmali - Lokmanya Tilak Terminus AC Superfast Express (72.95 km/h).

As the average speed of the train is above 55 km/h (34 mph), as per Indian Railways rules, its fare includes a Superfast surcharge.

== Routeing ==
The 22115 / 16 Lokmanya Tilak Terminus - Karmali AC Superfast Express runs from Lokmanya Tilak Terminus via Thane, Panvel, Chiplun, Ratnagiri, Kankavli, Kudal to Karmali.

== Traction ==
Earlier, the route was not electrified, a Kalyan Junction based WDM 3D or an WDG 3A locomotive powers the train up to its destination. Both trains were hauled by an Currently as Konkan Railways have completed electrification, the train is now hauled by an WAP-7 and so was WAP-4 from Lalaguda Shed

== Operation ==
22115 Lokmanya Tilak Terminus - Karmali AC Superfast Express leaves Lokmanya Tilak Terminus every Thursday at 00:50 AM & arriving Karmali on same day at 10:40 AM.

22116 Karmali - Lokmanya Tilak Terminus AC Superfast Express leaves Karmali every Thursday at 02:10 PM & arrives Lokmanya Tilak Terminus 11:25 PM on the same day.

== Sister Trains ==
- Dadar Madgaon Jan Shatabdi Express
- Konkan Kanya Express
- Mandovi Express
- Mumbai CSMT - Karmali Tejas Express
- Mumbai LTT - Madgaon AC Double Decker Express
