= Mumbai LTT–Tirunelveli Express =

Train in India

Mumbai Lokamanya Thilak Terminus - Tirunelveli Junction Superfast Express
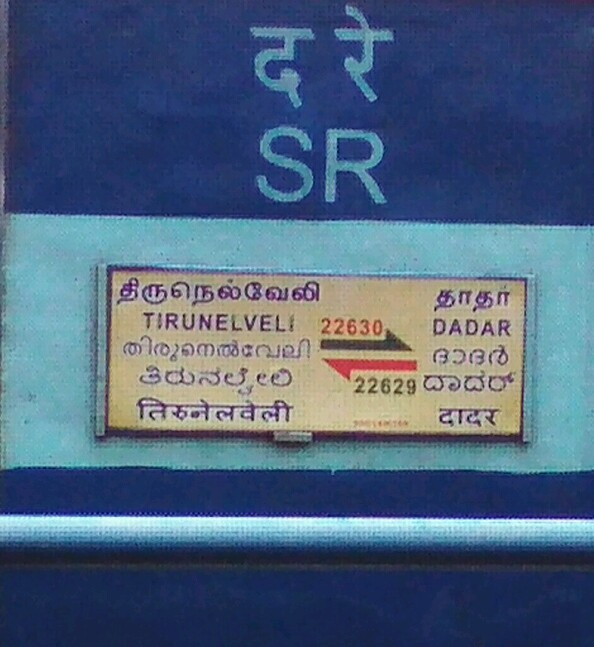

Overview
- Service type: Superfast
- First service: 3 May 2013; 13 years ago
- Current operator: Southern Railway zone

Route
- Termini: Lokmanya Tilak Terminus; Tirunelveli Junction
- Stops: 24
- Distance travelled: 2,028 km (1,260 mi)
- Average journey time: 36 hours
- Service frequency: Weekly
- Train number: 22629 / 22630

On-board services
- Classes: AC 2 Tier, AC 3 Tier, AC Economy, Sleeper Class, General Unreserved
- Seating arrangements: Yes
- Sleeping arrangements: Yes
- Catering facilities: No

Technical
- Rolling stock: LHB coach
- Track gauge: 1,676 mm (5 ft 6 in)
- Operating speed: 57 km/h (35 mph)
- Rake maintenance: Tirunelveli Junction
- Rake sharing: No

The 22629 / 30 Mumbai LTT–Tirunelveli Junction Superfast Express is a Superfast express train belonging to Indian Railways Southern Zone that runs between Lokmanya Tilak Terminus and Tirunelveli Junction in India. It is the only train that connects places like Madurai with Shoranur, Kozhikode, Kannur, Kasaragod, Mangaluru, Udupi, Mookambika Road, Madgaon, Thivim and Ratnagiri. It is one of the high demanded train of this route.

It operates as train number 22629 from Lokmanya Tilak Terminus Terminus to Tirunelveli Junction and as train number 22630 in the reverse direction serving the states of Maharashtra, Goa, Karnataka, Kerala & Tamil Nadu.

== Service ==
The 22629 Dadar - Tirunelveli Junction Superfast Express covers the distance of 2,025 km (1,258 mi) in 37 hours 05 mins (47 km/h) and in 33 hours 20 mins as the 22630 Tirunelveli Junction - Dadar Superfast Express (53 km/h).

As the average speed of the train is above 55 km/h (34 mph), as per railway rules, its fare includes a Superfast surcharge.

== Routing ==
The 22629 / 30 Dadar - Tirunelveli Junction Superfast Express runs from Dadar Terminus via Panvel, Ratnagiri, Madgaon Junction, Mangalore Junction, Shoranur Junction, Palakkad Junction, Coimbatore Junction, Madurai Junction to Tirunelveli Junction.

== Traction ==
As the route has been electrified an Electric Loco Shed, Royapuram or Electric Loco Shed, Erode based WAP-7 pulls the train from Dadar [towards the remaining part of the journey till Tirunelveli Junction.
