= Mumbai CSMT–Sawantwadi Road Express =

Train in India

Mumbai CSMT - Sawantwadi Road Express

Overview
- Service type: Express
- Status: Active
- Locale: Maharashtra
- First service: 8 September 2026; 28 days ago
- Current operator: Central Railway (CR)

Route
- Termini: Chhatrapati Shivaji Terminus (CSMT); Sawantwadi Road (SWV)
- Stops: 23
- Distance travelled: 505 km (314 mi)
- Average journey time: 13h 55m
- Service frequency: Daily
- Train number: 15087 / 15088

On-board services
- Classes: General Unreserved, Sleeper Class, AC 3rd Class Economy, AC 2nd Class, AC 1st Class
- Seating arrangements: Yes
- Sleeping arrangements: Yes
- Catering facilities: On-board Catering; E-Catering
- Observation facilities: Large windows
- Baggage facilities: No
- Other facilities: Below the seats

Technical
- Rolling stock: LHB coach
- Track gauge: 1,676 mm (5 ft 6 in)
- Electrification: 25 kV 50 Hz AC overhead line
- Operating speed: 130 km/h (81 mph) maximum, 36 km/h (22 mph) average including halts.
- Track owner: Indian Railways

The 15087 / 15088 Mumbai CSMT–Sawantwadi Road Express is an express train belonging to Central Railway zone that runs between the city Mumbai CSMT and Sawantwadi Road of Maharashtra in India.

It operates as train number 15087 from Mumbai CSMT to Sawantwadi Road and as train number 15088 in the reverse direction, serving the state of Maharashtra.

== Services ==
- 15087 / Mumbai CSMT–Sawantwadi Road Express has an average speed of 36 km/h and covers 505 km in 13h 55m.
- 15088 / Sawantwadi Road–Mumbai CSMT Express has an average speed of 37 km/h and covers 505 km in 13h 40m.

== Schedule ==
- 15087 – 11:55 PM (Daily) [Mumbai CSMT]
- 15088 – 5:00 PM (Daily) [Sawantwadi Road]

== Routes and halts ==
The important halts of the train are :

- Mumbai CSMT
- Dadar Central
- Thane
- Panvel Junction
- Pen
- Roha
- Mangaon
- Veer
- Khed
- Chiplun
- Sawarda
- Aravali Road
- Sangameshwar Road
- Ratnagiri
- Adavali
- Vilavade
- Rajapur Road
- Vaibhavwadi Road
- Nandgaon Road
- Kankavali
- Sindhudurg
- Kudal
- Sawantwadi Road

== Coach composition ==
The train has 19 coaches are :

1. General Unreserved - 4
2. Sleeper Class - 4
3. AC 3rd Class - 3
4. AC 3rd Class Economy - 5
5. AC 2nd Class - 2
6. AC 1st Class - 1

== Traction ==
As the entire route is fully electrified, it is hauled by a Bhusawal Loco Shed-based WAP-4 or Kalyan Loco Shed-based WAP-7 electric locomotive from Mumbai CSMT to Sawantwadi Road and vice versa.

== Rake reversal or rake share ==
The train will Rake Sharing with Pushpak Express (12533/12534).

== See also ==
Trains from Mumbai CSMT :

1. Mumbai CSMT–Hazrat Nizamuddin Rajdhani Express
2. Mumbai CSMT–Solapur Vande Bharat Express
3. Nandigram Express
4. Mumbai CSMT–Howrah Duronto Express
5. Punjab Mail

Trains from Sawantwadi Road :

1. Tutari Express
2. Sawantwadi Road–Madgaon Passenger

== Notes ==
a. Runs daily in a week in both directions.
