= Sindhudurg Passenger =

Train in India

Sindhudurg Express
Overview
- Service type: Passenger
- First service: 5 April 1999; 27 years ago
- Current operator: Konkan Railway

Route
- Termini: Diva Junction (DIVA); Sawantwadi Road (SWV)
- Stops: 47
- Distance travelled: 465 km (289 mi)
- Average journey time: 10h 45m
- Service frequency: Daily (Note: Runs seven days in a week for every direction.)
- Train number: 10105/10106

On-board services
- Classes: Second Sitting, Unreserved
- Seating arrangements: Yes
- Sleeping arrangements: No
- Catering facilities: Yes on
- Observation facilities: LHB coach
- Entertainment facilities: No
- Baggage facilities: Below the seats

Technical
- Rolling stock: 2
- Track gauge: 5 ft 6 in (1,676 mm)
- Electrification: Yes
- Operating speed: 43 km/h (27 mph) average with halts

The Sindhudurg Express is a passenger train belonging to Konkan Railway that runs between Diva Junction and Sawantwadi Road.It is also known by name Diva-Sawantwadi Passenger. It is currently being operated with 10105/10106 train numbers on a daily basis. Sindhudurg passenger train uses Konkan Railway Corporation Limited built railway track from Roha to reach Savantvadi. This passenger trains helps people living in the cities of Mumbai,Thane, Kalyan-Dombivili and Navi Mumbai to go to their respective native places in Kokan (Malvan) region of Maharashtra state. Local vendors serve local eatables in this train.

== Average speed and frequency ==
The 10105/Sindhudurg Passenger runs with an average speed of 43 km/h and completes 465 km in 10h 45m. The 10106/Sindhudurg Passenger runs with an average speed of 40 km/h and completes 465 km in 11h 40m. This is a day train connecting most of the railway stations in coastal Maharashtra.

== Route and halts ==
The important halts of the train are:

- Diva Junction
- Panvel
- Apta
- Jite
- Roha (Technical Halt) crew Change
- Mangaon
- Veer
- Khed
- Chiplun
- Kamathe
- Sangameshwar Road
- Ratnagiri
- Rajapur Road
- Vaibhavwadi Road
- Kankavli
- Sindhudurg
- Kudal
- Zarap
- Sawantwadi Road

== Coach composite ==
The train has standard LHB rakes with max speed of 160 kmph. The train consists of 17 coaches:

- 6 Second Sitting
- 2 A/C three tier economy
- 11General Unreserved
- 2 Seating cum Luggage Rake

== Traction ==
Both trains are hauled by a Bhusaval locoshed based WAP4 Electric locomotive from Sawantwadi to Diva and vice versa.

== Rake sharing ==
The train shares its rake with 50107/50108 Sawantwadi Road - Madgaon Passenger and 50119/50120 Diva - Panvel Passenger.

== Accident ==
Diva -Sawantwadi passenger train derailed at around 9.30 A.M. after crossing Bhise Khind tunnel near Nagothane,Raigad district of Maharashtra state on 4 May 2014 killing 21 passengers on board and 124 injured.

== See also ==
- Sawantwadi Road railway station
- Diva Junction railway station
- Sawantwadi Road - Madgaon Passenger
- Diva - Panvel Passenger
