= Dadar–Ratnagiri Passenger =

Train in India

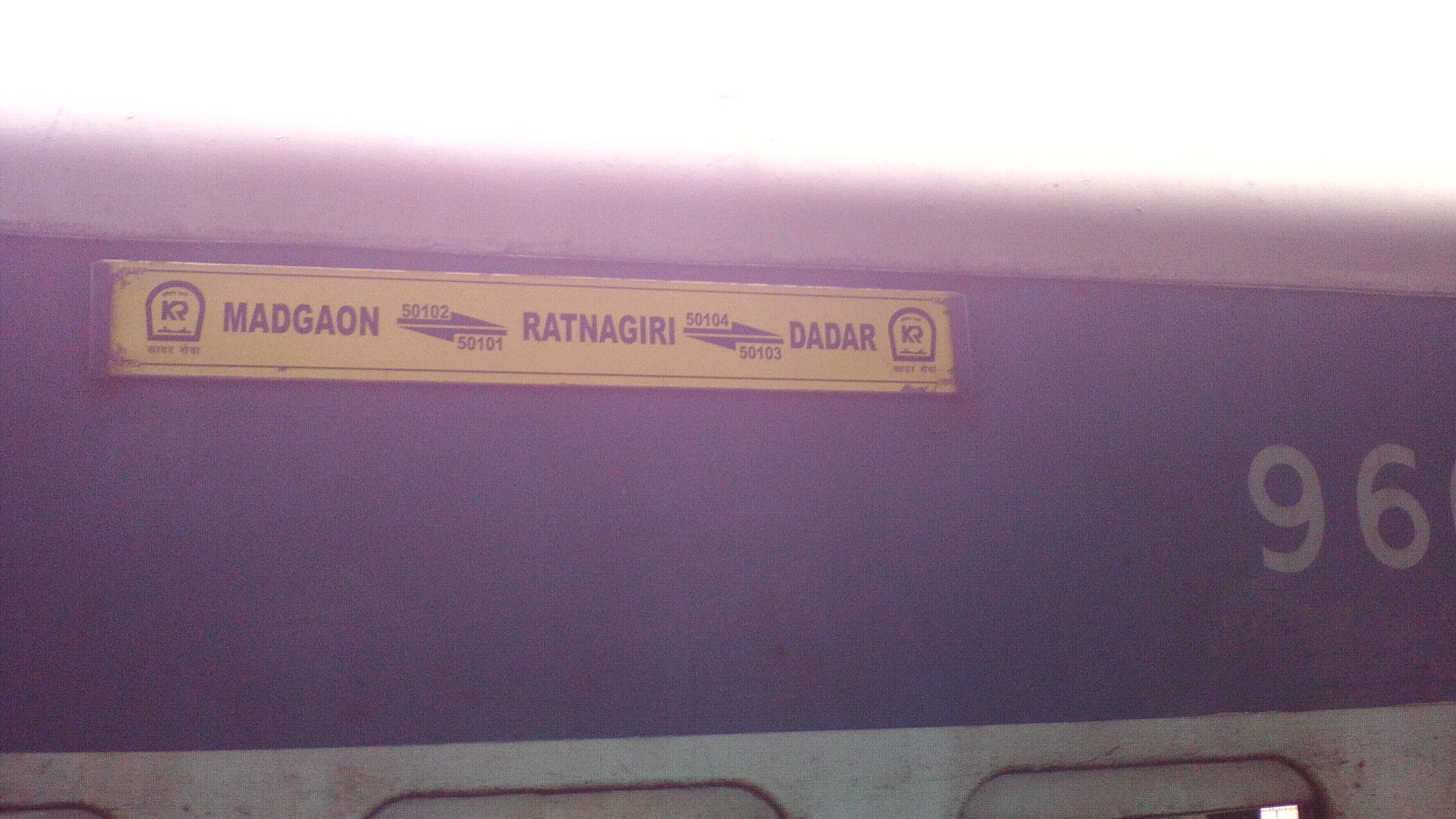

Overview
- Service type: Passenger
- First service: 1998
- Current operator: Konkan Railway

Route
- Termini: Dadar; Ratnagiri (RN)
- Stops: 36
- Distance travelled: 336 km (209 mi)
- Average journey time: 9h 10m
- Service frequency: Daily (Note: Runs seven days in a week for every direction.)
- Train number: 50103/50104

On-board services
- Class: Unreserved
- Seating arrangements: Yes
- Sleeping arrangements: No
- Catering facilities: No
- Observation facilities: LHB coach
- Entertainment facilities: No
- Baggage facilities: Below the seats

Technical
- Rolling stock: 1
- Track gauge: 5 ft 6 in (1,676 mm)
- Electrification: Yes (WCAM 2)
- Operating speed: 37 km/h (23 mph) average with halts

Dadar–Ratnagiri Passenger is a passenger train belonging to Konkan Railway that runs between Dadar and Ratnagiri. As of 14 April 2026 it is operated between Diva and Ratnagiri only when the schedule of this train was changed during Covid 19 Corona pandemic lockdown in 2020 A.D., there has been demand to restore to its original destination Dadar It is currently being operated with 50103/50104 train numbers on a daily basis.

== Average speed and frequency ==
The 50103/Dadar–Ratnagiri Passenger runs with an average speed of 37 km/h and completes 336 km in 9h 10m. The 50104/Ratnagiri–Dadar Passenger runs with an average speed of 38 km/h and completes 336 km in 8h 50m.

== Route and halts ==
The important halts of the train are:

- Dadar
- Thane
- Diva Junction
- Panvel
- Pen
- Nagothane
- Roha
- Kolad
- Indapur
- Mangaon
- Veer
- Karanjadi
- Vinhere
- Khed
- Anjani
- Chiplun
- Kamathe
- Sawarda
- Aravali
- Sangameshwar Road
- Ratnagiri

== Coach composite ==
The train has standard LHB rakes with max speed of 160 kmph. The train consists of 17 coaches:

- 2 Second Sitting
- 13 General Unreserved
- 2 Seating cum Luggage Rake

== Traction ==
Both trains are hauled by a Kalyan Loco Shed-based WCAM 2 or WCAM 3 electric locomotive from Ratnagiri to Diva and vice versa. This was the first train on Konkan Railway to have an electric locomotive.

== Rake sharing ==
The train shares its rake with 50101/50102 Ratnagiri–Madgaon Passenger and rake is maintained by Madgaon coaching depot.

== Schedule ==
50103/50104 – runs daily.

Train number	Station code	Departure station	Departure time	Arrival station	Arrival time
50103	DR	Dadar	3:20	Ratnagiri	12:50 AM (night)
50104	RN	Ratnagiri	05:30 AM	Dadar	1:25 PM (same day)

== See also ==
- Ratnagiri–Madgaon Passenger
