= Ratnagiri–Madgaon Passenger =

Train in India

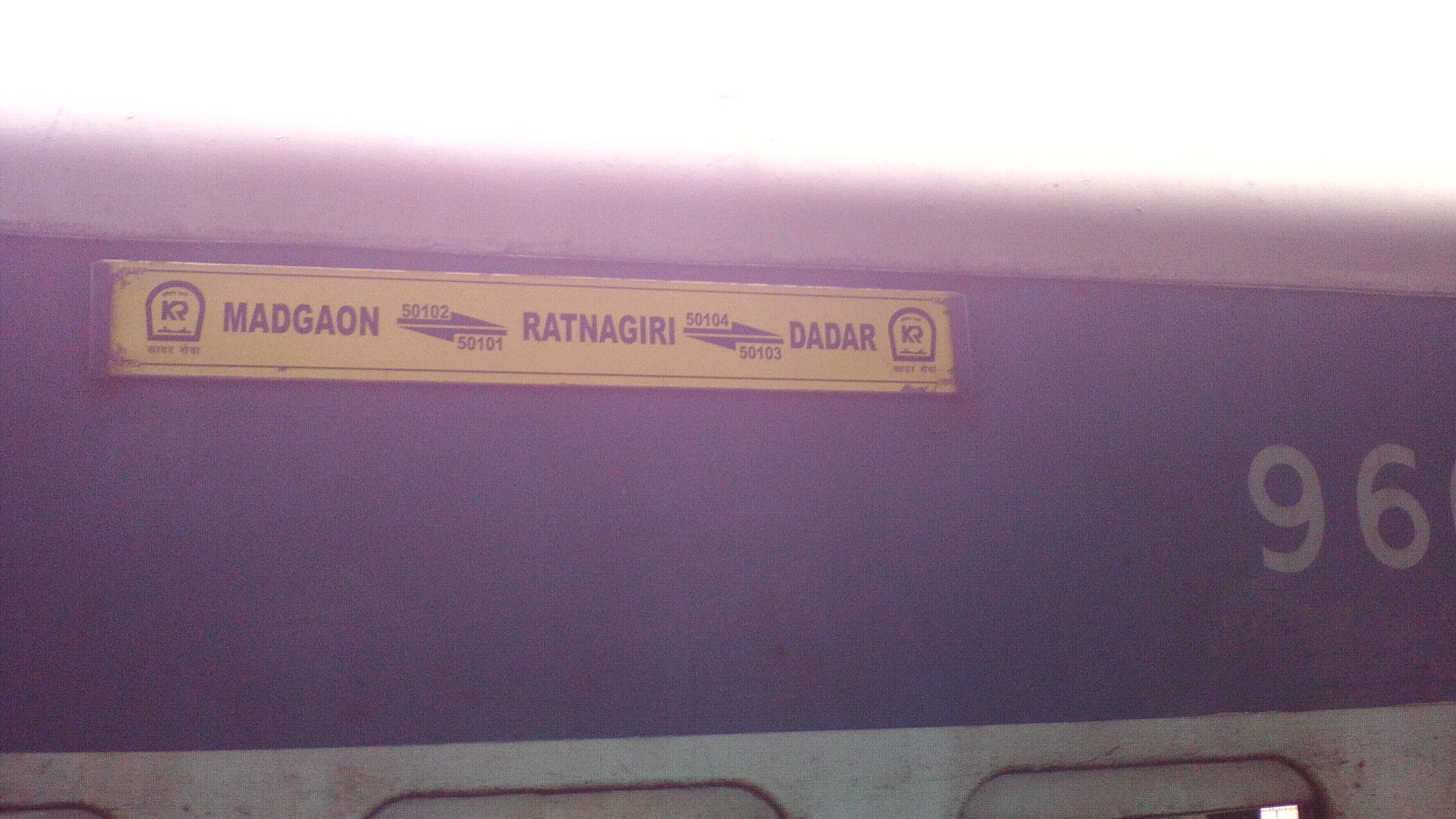

Overview
- Service type: Passenger
- First service: 31 March 2015; 10 years ago
- Current operator: Konkan Railway

Route
- Termini: Ratnagiri (RN); Madgaon Junction (MAO)
- Stops: 20
- Distance travelled: 236 km (147 mi)
- Average journey time: 6h 50m
- Service frequency: One daily in each direction
- Train number: 50101/50102

On-board services
- Class: Unreserved
- Seating arrangements: Yes
- Sleeping arrangements: No
- Catering facilities: No
- Observation facilities: ICF coach
- Entertainment facilities: No
- Baggage facilities: Below the seats

Technical
- Rolling stock: 2
- Track gauge: 5 ft 6 in (1,676 mm)
- Electrification: No
- Operating speed: 35 km/h (22 mph) average

The Ratnagiri–Madgaon Passenger is a passenger train belonging to Konkan Railway that runs between Ratnagiri and Madgaon Junction in India. It is operated with 50101/50102 train numbers, with one train daily in each direction. There is also a faster Ratnagiri – Madgaon Express (10101) daily service.

== Average speed and frequency ==
As of December 2021 the Ratnagiri–Madgaon Passenger runs at an average speed of 35 km/h and travels 236 km in 6h 50m.

== Route and halts ==
The important halts of the train are:

- Ratnagiri
- Rajapur Road
- Vaibhavwadi Road
- Kankavli
- Sindhudurg
- Kudal
- Sawantwadi Road
- Pernem
- Thivim
- Karmali
- Majorda Junction
- Madgaon Junction

== Coach composite ==
The train has standard ICF rakes with max speed of 110 kmph. The train consists of 19 coaches:

- 17 General Unreserved
- 2 Seating cum Luggage Rake

== Traction ==
Both trains are hauled by a Kalyan Loco Shed-based WDM-3D or WDG-3A diesel locomotive from Ratnagiri to Madgaon and vice versa.

== Schedule ==
50101/50102 runs daily at the following times:

Train number	Station code	Departure station	Departure time	Arrival station	Arrival time
50101	RN	Ratnagiri	3:20 AM	Madgaon Junction	10:10 AM (same day)
50102	MAO	Madgaon Junction	7:10 PM	Ratnagiri	12:50 AM (night)

The timetable may be changed during the monsoon season.

== Rake sharing ==
The train shares its rake with 50103/50104 Dadar Central–Ratnagiri Passenger.

== See also ==
- Ratnagiri railway station
- Madgaon Junction railway station
- Dadar Central–Ratnagiri Passenger
