= Netravati Express =

Train in India

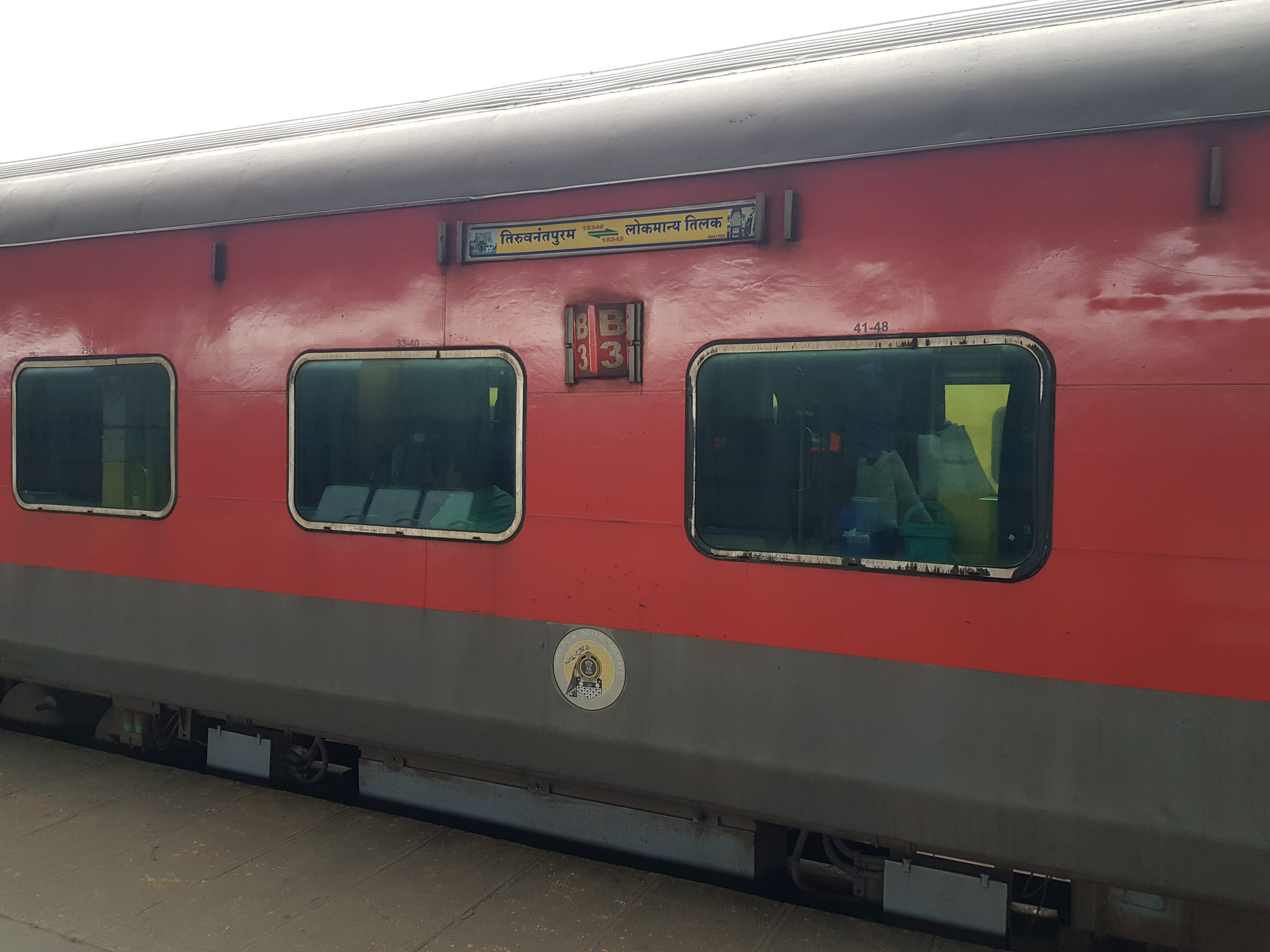
- Netravati Express standing at Thiruvananthapuram Central station.

Overview
- Service type: Express
- Locale: Maharashtra, Goa, Karnataka & Kerala
- First service: 1 April 1987; 39 years ago (Inaugural), 1 March 1998; 28 years ago (First run through Konkan Railway); 10 February 2001; 25 years ago (Extended upto Thiruvananthapuram Central).
- Current operator: Southern Railway

Route
- Termini: Mumbai Lokmanya Tilak Terminus (LTT); Thiruvananthapuram Central (TVC)
- Stops: 49
- Distance travelled: 1,815 km (1,128 mi)
- Average journey time: 30 hours 45 minutes
- Service frequency: Daily
- Train number: 16345 / 16346

On-board services
- Classes: AC 2 Tier, AC 3 Tier, AC 3 Tier Economy, Sleeper Class, General Unreserved
- Seating arrangements: Yes
- Sleeping arrangements: Yes
- Catering facilities: Available through Pantry
- Observation facilities: Large windows
- Baggage facilities: Available
- Other facilities: Below the seats

Technical
- Rolling stock: LHB coach
- Operating speed: 49.99 km/h (31 mph) average including Halts.
Route map
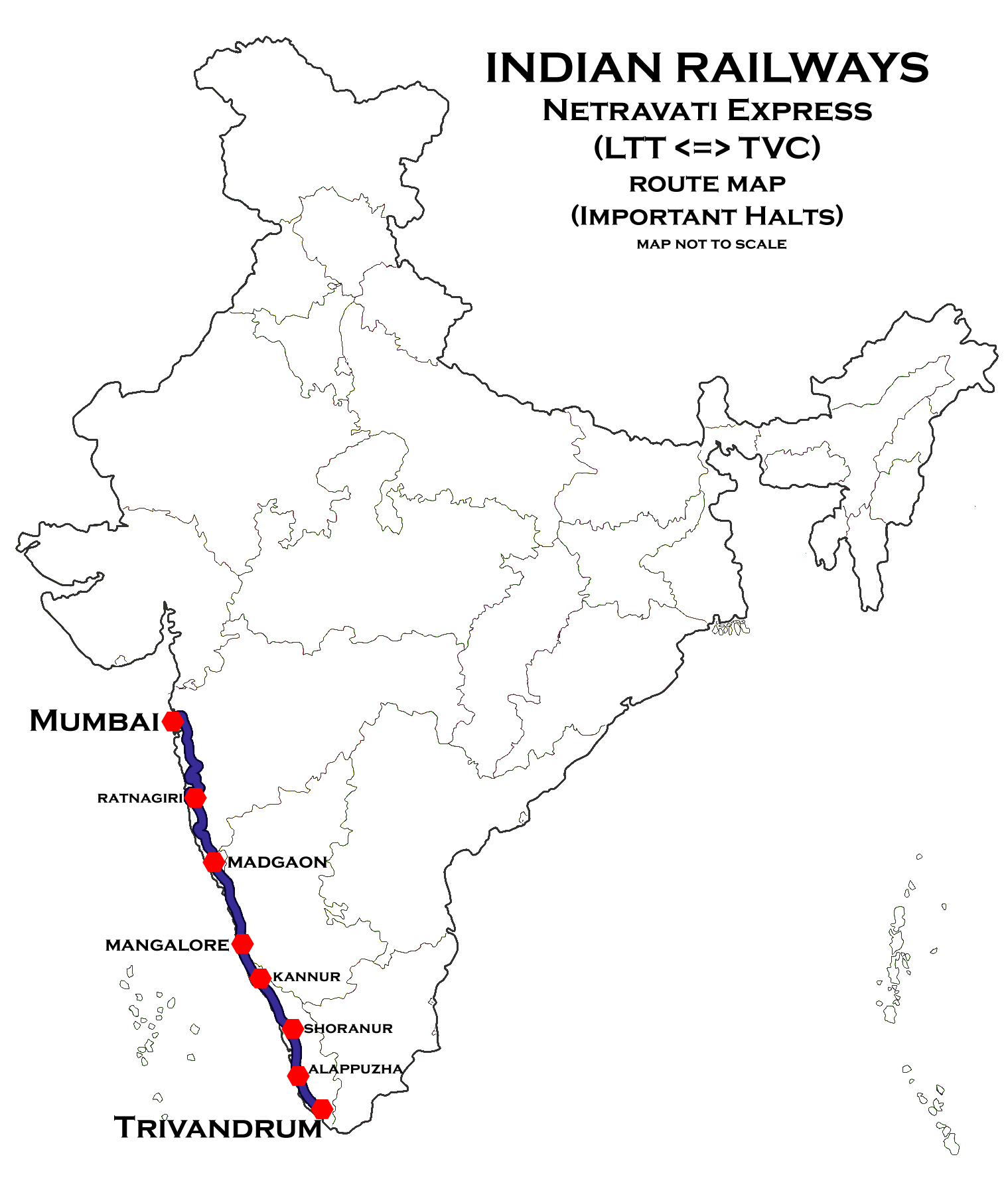

The 16345 / 16346 Netravati Express is a daily Express train connecting capital cities of Kerala and Maharashtra. It operates between Mumbai Lokmanya Tilak Terminus and Thiruvananthapuram Central. The train runs on the Konkan Railway. It is the one and only daily train in Kerala which connects Mumbai to Thiruvananthapuram and vice versa on a daily basis, and this is the first scheduled train service to run the length of the Konkan Railway which started running on March 1, 1998. It was later extended to Thiruvananthapuram.

== History ==
Initially the train the Bombay Kurla (LTT)–Mangalore Netravati Express was plied between Bombay to Mangalore from April 1, 1987 as link via the inland Poona, Gulbarga, Guntakal, Krishnarajapuram, Palakkad route parting at Shornur Junction. Trains on the old route used to take 48 hours to reach Mangalore from Bombay. After the Konkan Railway line was operational in 1998, the route has been changed via the Konkan Railway and the Mangalore–Bombay running time was reduced drastically to 16 hours. On March 1, 1998, the Bombay Kurla (LTT)–Mangalore Netravati Express started running via the Konkan, making it the first scheduled service that ran the length of the Konkan Railway. The link express was made a single train till Cochin Harbour Terminus and further extended till Thiruvananthapuram Central (which is the capital city of Kerala) from 10 February 2001.

== Background ==
Mangalore city is situated at the banks of the Netravati River. Since this trains terminating point was Mangalore back then, the name of the train was set as Netravati Express.

== Traction ==
earlier was Erode-based WDM-3D. As the route is completely electrified since 30 March 2022, a Royapuram or an Erode-based WAP-7 Vadodara-based WAP-5 Vadodara-based WAP-P5 Vadodara-based Indian locomotive class WAP-5 hauls the train throughout its entire journey.

== Schedule ==
- Non Monsoon Schedule

Train number	Station code	Departure station	Departure time	Departure day	Arrival station	Arrival time	Arrival day
16346	TVC	Thiruvananthapuram Central	9:15 Hrs	Daily	Mumbai Lokmanya Tilak (T)	17:05 Hrs	Daily (next day)
16345	LTT	Mumbai Lokmanya Tilak (T)	11:40 Hrs	Daily	Thiruvananthapuram Central	18:05 Hrs	Daily (next day)

== Routing ==
The 16345/46 Netravati Express runs from

- Mumbai LTT
- Thane
- Panvel
- Roha (Technical Halt) crew Change
- Khed
- Chiplun
- Sangameshwar Road
- Ratnagiri
- Rajapur Road
- Kudal
- Thivim
- Karmali
- Madgaon Junction
- Canacona
- Karwar
- Kumta
- Murdeshwar
- Bhatkal
- Mookambika Road Byndoor
- Kundapura
- Udupi
- Surathkal
- Mangalore Junction
- Kasaragod
- Kanhangad
- Cheruvathur
- Payyanur
- Kannapuram
- Kannur
- Thalassery
- Vadakara
- Kozhikode
- Parappanangadi
- Tirur
- Kuttippuram
- Shoranur Junction
- Thrissur
- Aluva
- Ernakulam Junction
- Cherthala
- Alappuzha
- Ambalappuzha
- Haripad
- Kayamkulam Junction
- Karunagappalli
- Kollam Junction
- Varkala Sivagiri
- Thiruvananthapuram Central

== Coach composition ==
The train was upgraded to modern LHB rake on September 26, 2019, with an MPS of 145 kmph. The train consists of 25 coaches:

- 1 AC II Tier coach
- 1 AC III Tier coach
- 4 AC III Tier Economy coaches
- 11 Sleeper coaches
- 1 Pantry car
- 4 General coaches
- 1 General coach Divyangjan Friendly
- 1 Generator cars
- 1 Parcel Van

Loco	1	2	3	4	5	6	7	8	9	10	11	12	13	14	15	16	17	18	19	20	21	22	23	24	25
	VPH	EOG	UR	UR	S1	S2	S3	S4	S5	S6	S7	S8	S9	S10	S11	PC	M4	M3	M2	M1	B1	A1	UR	UR	SLR

(Coach Position of 16345 Netravati Express)

No rake sharing. Four dedicated LHB rakes.

== See also ==
- Ernakulam–Okha Express
