= Tutari Express =

Indian express train

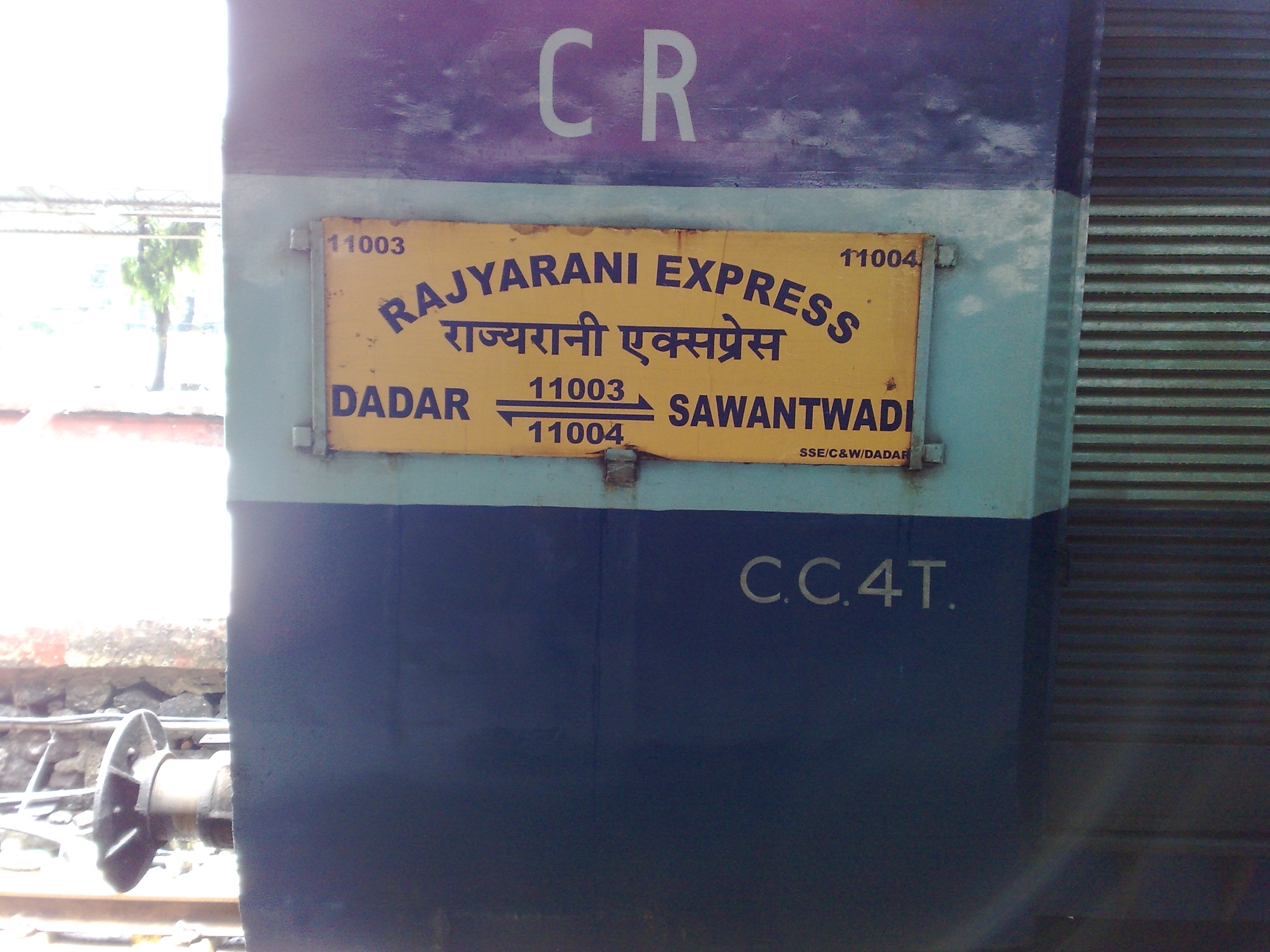

Overview
- Service type: Rajya Rani Express
- Locale: Maharashtra
- First service: 1 July 2011; 14 years ago
- Current operator: Central Railways

Route
- Termini: Dadar Terminus (DR); Sawantwadi Road (SWV)
- Stops: 21
- Distance travelled: 497.8 km (309 mi)
- Average journey time: 12 hours 15 minutes
- Service frequency: Daily
- Train number: 11003 / 11004

On-board services
- Classes: AC 2 tier, AC 3 tier, Sleeper Class, General Unreserved
- Seating arrangements: Yes
- Sleeping arrangements: Yes
- Catering facilities: On-board catering E-catering
- Other facilities: Below the seats

Technical
- Rolling stock: ICF coach
- Track gauge: 1,676 mm (5 ft 6 in)
- Operating speed: 110 km/h (68 mph) maximum, 47 km/h (29 mph) average including halts

The 11003 / 11004 Tutari Express (formerly Dadar Terminus–Sawantwadi Road Rajya Rani Express) is an express train belonging to Indian Railways – Central Railway zone that runs between Mumbai and Sawantwadi in Sindhudurg district of Maharashtra in India. It operates as train number 11003 from Dadar Terminus to Sawantwadi Road and as train number 11004 in the reverse direction.

As a sign of respect to revolutionary Marathi poet Krishnaji Keshav Damle, who wrote under the pen name 'Keshavsut', the railways has decided to rename the train Tutari Express on 22 May 2017, after the title of his famous Marathi poem "Tutari" which means a trumpet-like instrument in Marathi.

== Coaches ==
The 11003/11004 Tutari Express presently has 1 AC 2 tier, 1 AC 3 tier, 7 Sleeper class and 4 Unreserved/General coaches.

As with most train services in India, coach composition may be amended at the discretion of Indian Railways depending on demand.

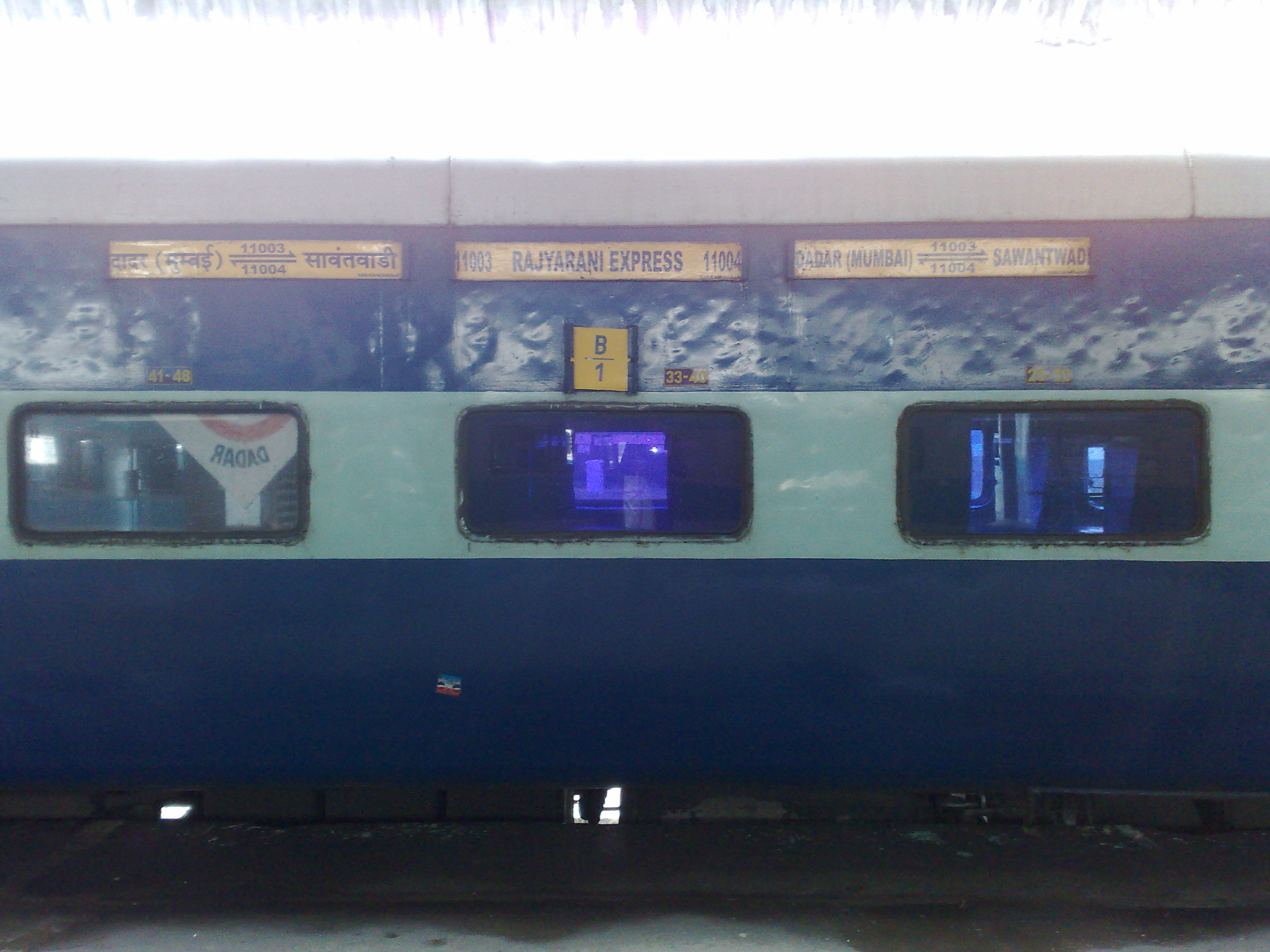
11003 Rajyarani Express AC 3 tier coach

== Service ==
The 11003 Tutari Express covers the distance of 497.8 kilometres in 10 hours 35 mins (47 km/h) and in 11 hours 55 mins as 11004 Tutari Express (42 km/h).

== Route and halts ==
- Dadar
- Thane
- Panvel
- Roha (Technical Halt) crew Change
- Khed
- Chiplun
- Sawarda
- Aravali Road
- Vilavade
- Rajapur Road
- Vaibhavwadi Road
- Kankavli
- Sindhudurg
- Kudal
- Sawantwadi Road

== Traction ==
Even though the route is completely electrified, it is diesel-hauled end to end. A WDP-4D locomotive from the Kalyan shed hauls the train for its entire journey.

== Timetable ==
11003 Tutari Express leaves Dadar Terminus every day at 00:05 hrs IST and reaches Sawantwadi Road at 10:40 hrs IST the same day.

11004 Tutari Express leaves Sawantwadi Road every day at 18:50 hrs IST and reaches Dadar Terminus at 06:45 hrs IST the next day.

== See also ==
- Rajya Rani Express
- List of named passenger trains in India
