= Vasco da Gama – Muzaffarpur Special =

Train in India

Vasco da Gama (Goa) – Muzaffarpur Special
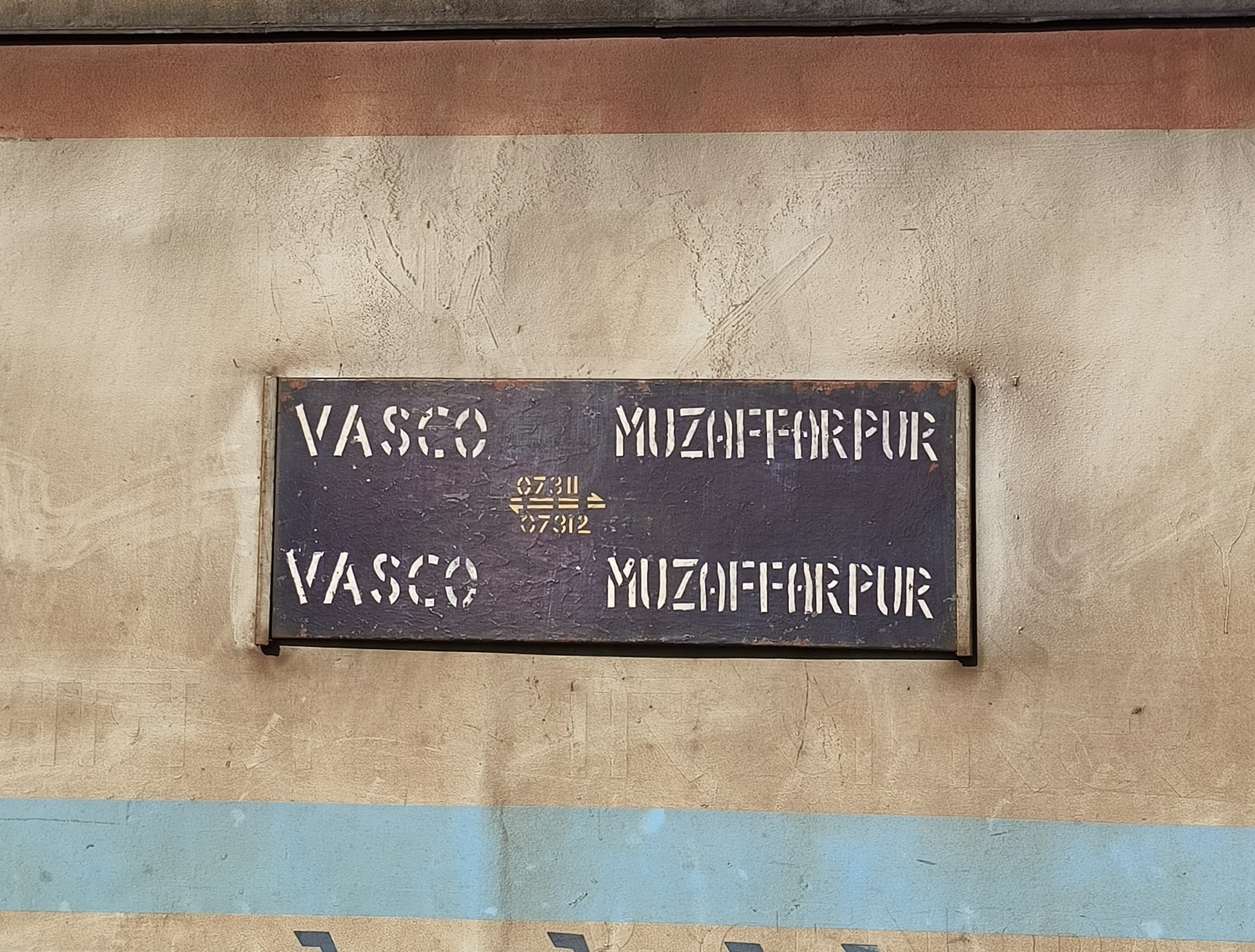
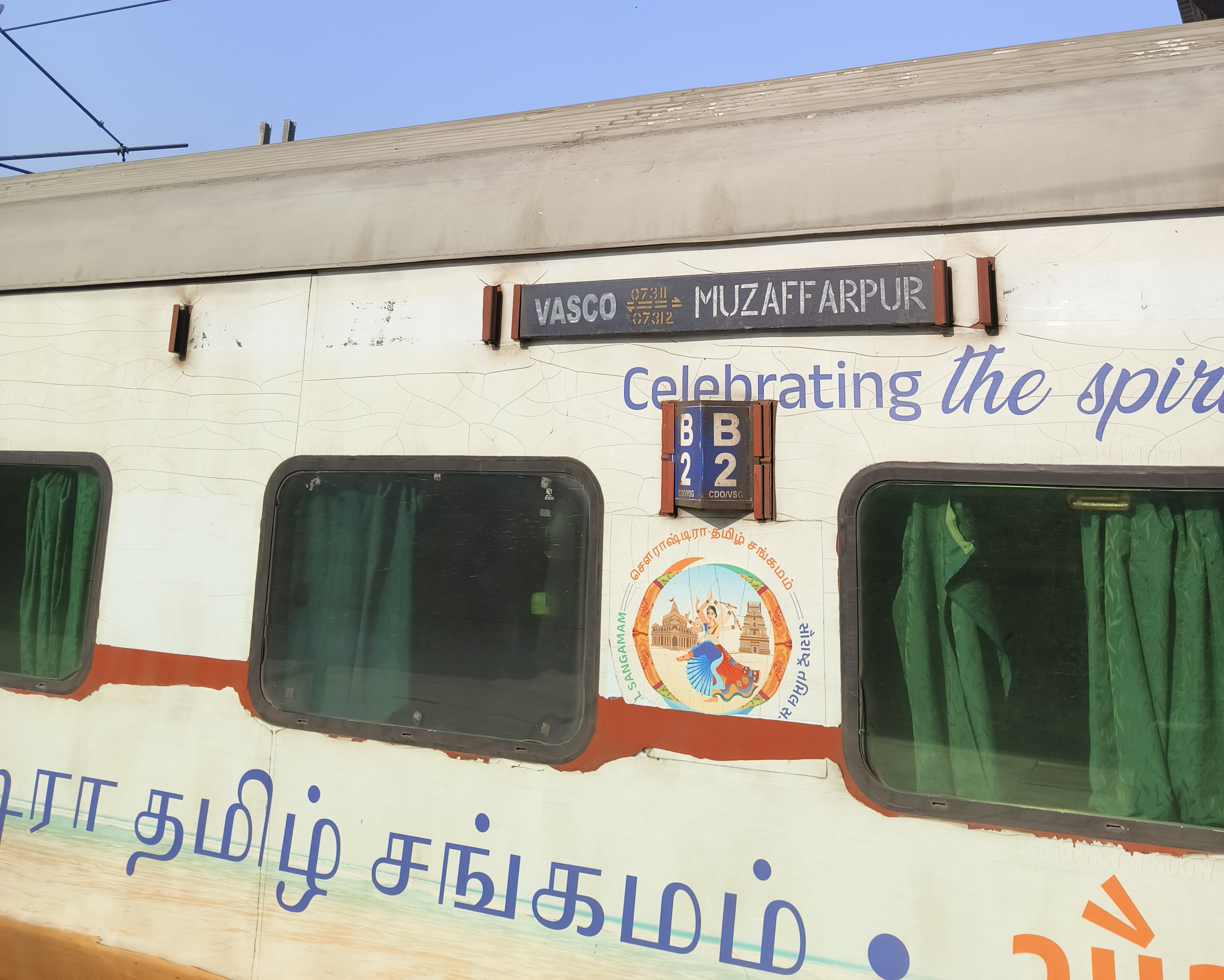
- 07312 standing at Muzaffarpur Junction

Overview
- Service type: Special Express
- Locale: Goa, Karnataka, Maharashtra, Madhya Pradesh, Uttar Pradesh & Bihar
- First service: 7 April 2025; 13 months ago (commercial service)
- Last service: December 25, 2025; 4 months ago
- Current operator: South Western Railways / East Central Railways

Route
- Termini: Vasco da Gama (VSG); Muzaffarpur Junction (MFP)
- Stops: (about 20+)
- Distance travelled: 2,400 km (1,491 mi) (approx.)
- Average journey time: Around 46 hours
- Service frequency: Special (As per demand)
- Train number: 07311 / 07312

On-board services
- Classes: AC first class, AC 2-tier, AC 3-tier, Sleeper class, General unreserved
- Seating arrangements: Yes
- Sleeping arrangements: Yes
- Catering facilities: Available
- Observation facilities: Large windows
- Entertainment facilities: No
- Baggage facilities: Below the seats

Technical
- Rolling stock: LHB coach
- Track gauge: 1,676 mm (5 ft 6 in)
- Operating speed: 110 km/h (68 mph) maximum, 50–55 km/h (31–34 mph) average including halts

The Vasco da Gama–Muzaffarpur Express Special also known as Muzaffarpur Goa Express is a long-distance express train operated by the Indian Railways connecting Vasco da Gama in Goa with Muzaffarpur Junction in Bihar via Margao, Tivim, Mumbai.

== Schedule ==
07311 / 07312 Vasco da Gama – Muzaffarpur Special
Train type	Train on demand / Special
Distance	2303 km
Average speed	~50 km/h
Journey time (VSG → MFP)	46 hrs
Journey time (MFP → VSG)	48 hrs 10 min
Classes available	1A, 2A, 3A, SL, GS
Operating days	VSG → MFP: Monday; MFP → VSG: Thursday
Operator	South Western Railway (SWR)

== Route and halts ==
07311 VSG–MFP SPL and 07312 MFP–VSG SPL Schedule
Sr.	07311 VSG–MFP SPL (Mon)				07312 MFP–VSG SPL (Thu)			
Sr.	Station	Day	Arr.	Dep.	Station	Day	Arr.	Dep.
1	Vasco da Gama	1	—	14:30	Muzaffarpur Junction	1	—	14:45
2	Madgaon Junction	1	16:00	16:20	Hajipur Junction	1	15:55	16:00
3	Thivim	1	17:10	17:12	Patliputra Junction	1	16:50	17:00
4	Sawantwadi Road	1	17:42	17:44	Danapur	1	17:20	17:22
5	Ratnagiri	1	20:50	20:55	Ara Junction	1	18:13	18:15
6	Chiplun	1	22:38	22:40	Buxar	1	19:00	19:02
7	Roha	2	01:40	01:45	Pt. Deen Dayal Upadhyaya Junction	1	20:50	21:00
8	Panvel	2	02:50	02:55	Prayagraj Chheoki Junction	1	23:35	23:45
9	Kalyan Junction	2	03:40	03:45	Manikpur Junction	2	01:35	01:37
10	Manmad Junction	2	07:15	07:25	Satna Junction	2	03:05	03:10
11	Bhusaval Junction	2	10:00	10:10	Katni Junction	2	04:40	04:45
12	Khandwa Junction	2	13:05	13:10	Jabalpur Junction	2	06:00	06:10
13	Itarsi Junction	2	15:45	15:55	Itarsi Junction	2	10:40	10:50
14	Jabalpur	2	20:00	20:10	Khandwa Junction	2	13:20	13:25
15	Katni Junction	2	21:20	21:25	Bhusaval Junction	2	15:10	15:20
16	Satna Junction	2	23:00	23:05	Manmad Junction	2	18:00	18:10
17	Manikpur Junction	3	01:28	01:30	Kalyan Junction	2	22:50	23:00
18	Prayagraj Chheoki Junction	3	03:25	03:30	Panvel	3	00:05	00:10
19	Pt. Deen Dayal Upadhyaya Junction	3	06:30	06:40	Roha	3	01:00	01:05
20	Buxar	3	07:49	07:51	Chiplun	3	03:26	03:28
21	Ara Junction	3	08:40	08:42	Ratnagiri	3	06:40	06:45
22	Danapur	3	09:13	09:15	Sawantwadi Road	3	10:00	10:02
23	Patliputra Junction	3	09:40	09:50	Thivim	3	10:50	10:52
24	Hajipur Junction	3	10:30	10:35	Madgaon Junction	3	12:30	12:50
25	Muzaffarpur Junction	3	12:30	—	Vasco da Gama	3	14:55	—

== Coach composition ==
Category	Coaches	Total
AC first class (1A)	H1	1
AC two-tier (2A)	A1, A2	2
AC three-tier (3A)	B1, B2, B3	3
Sleeper class (SL)	S1, S2, S3, S4, S5, S6, S7, S8, S9	9
Second class (2S)	D1, D2, D3	3
Second class cum luggage rake (SLR)	SLR	1
Generator Car (EOG)	EOG	1
Total coaches		20

- Primary maintenance - Vasco Coaching Depot
- Secondary maintenance - Muzaffarpur Coaching Depot

== Traction ==
The train is hauled by diesel locomotives end to end.

== See also ==
- Muzaffarpur Junction railway station
- Vasco da Gama railway station
- South Western Railway zone
- East Central Railway zone
