= Ratnagiri railway division =

Railway division in Maharashtra, India

Ratnagiri railway division is one of the two railway divisions under Konkan Railway of Indian Railways. This railway division was formed on 26 January 1998 and its headquarters is located at Ratnagiri in the state of Maharashtra of India.

The Ratnagiri railway division extends over 361 km (224 mi) from Roha to Sawantwadi in Maharashtra. Ratnagiri railway region is headed by a Regional Railway Manager.

== List of railway stations and towns ==
The list includes the stations under the Ratnagiri railway division and their station category.

Category of station	No. of stations	Names of stations
A-1	0	
A	7	
B	-	Ratnagiri, Kankavli, Sindhudurg, Sawantwadi Road, Chiplun
C Suburban station	-	-
D	-	-
E	-	-
F Halt station	-	-
Total	-	-
