= Indapur railway station =

Railway Station in Maharashtra, India

General information
- Location: Kochi–Panvel Road, Indapur, Maharashtra
- Coordinates: 18°17′52.7″N 73°14′41.6″E
- Owner: Indian Railways
- Line: Konkan Railway
- Platforms: 2
- Tracks: 2

Other information
- Status: Active
- Station code: INP
- Fare zone: Ratnagiri railway division

Services
Preceding station	Indian Railways	Following station
Kolad towards Roha	Konkan Railway Konkan Railway	Mangaon towards Thokur
Location
- Location within India Location within Maharashtra

Indapur railway station is a railway station on Konkan Railway line of Indian Railways. It is located at Indapur village near the town of Mangaon in the Raigad district of Maharashtra. It is at a distance of 23.86 km (14.8 mi) down from northern end of Konkan Railways. The previous station on the line is Kolad railway station and the succeeding station is Mangaon railway station.

As of April 2018, no express trains halt at Indapur. It is served by Dadar–Ratnagiri Passenger trains.
