= Diva–Panvel Passenger =

Train in India

Overview
- Service type: Passenger
- Current operator: Central Railway

Route
- Termini: Diva Junction (DIVA); Panvel (PNVL)
- Stops: 4
- Distance travelled: 25 km (16 mi)
- Average journey time: 50m
- Service frequency: Daily (Note: Runs seven days in a week for every direction.)
- Train number: 50119/50120

On-board services
- Class: Unreserved
- Seating arrangements: Yes
- Sleeping arrangements: No
- Catering facilities: No
- Observation facilities: ICF coach
- Entertainment facilities: No
- Baggage facilities: Below the seats

Technical
- Rolling stock: 2
- Track gauge: 5 ft 6 in (1,676 mm)
- Electrification: No
- Operating speed: 30 km/h (19 mph) average with halts

The Diva—Panvel Passenger is a passenger train belonging to Central Railway of India that runs between Diva Junction and Panvel. It is currently being operated with 50119/50120 train numbers on a daily basis.

== Average speed and frequency ==
The 50119/Diva–Panvel Passenger runs with an average speed of 30 km/h and completes 25 km in 50m. The 50120/Panvel–Diva Passenger runs with an average speed of 34 km/h and completes 25 km in 45m.

== Route and halts ==
The important halts of the train are:

- Diva Junction
- Dativali
- Nilaje
- Taloje Panchnand
- Navde Road
- Kalamboli
- Panvel

== Coach composite ==
The train has standard ICF rakes with max speed of 110 kmph. The train consists of 19 coaches:

- 17 General Unreserved
- 2 Seating cum Luggage Rake

== Traction ==
Both trains are hauled by a Kalyan Loco Shed-based WDM-3D or WDG-3A diesel locomotive from Diva to Panvel and vice versa.

== Rake sharing ==
The train shares its rake with 50107/50108 Sawantwadi Road–Madgaon Passenger and 50105/50106 Sindhudurg Passenger.

== See also ==
- Sawantwadi Road–Madgaon Passenger
- Sindhudurg Passenger
