= Sawantwadi Road–Madgaon Passenger =

Train operated by Konkan Railway in India

Overview
- Service type: Passenger
- Current operator(s): Konkan Railway

Route
- Termini: Sawantwadi Road (SWV); Madgaon Junction (MAO)
- Stops: 7
- Distance travelled: 76 km (47 mi)
- Average journey time: 5h 40m
- Service frequency: Daily (Note: Runs seven days in a week for every direction.)
- Train number(s): 50107/50108

On-board services
- Class(es): Unreserved
- Seating arrangements: Yes
- Sleeping arrangements: No
- Catering facilities: No
- Observation facilities: ICF coach
- Entertainment facilities: No
- Baggage facilities: Below the seats

Technical
- Rolling stock: 2
- Track gauge: 5 ft 6 in (1,676 mm)
- Electrification: No
- Operating speed: 34 km/h (21 mph) average with halts

The Sawantwadi Road–Madgaon Passenger is a passenger train belonging to Konkan Railway that runs between Sawantwadi Road and Madgaon Junction. It is currently operated with 50107/50108 train numbers on a daily basis.

== Average speed and frequency ==
The 50107/Sawantwadi Road–Madgaon Passenger runs with an average speed of 34 km/h and completes 76 km in 2 hours 15 minutes. The 50108/Madgaon–Sawantwadi Road Passenger runs with an average speed of 35 km/h and completes 76 km in 2 hours 10 minutes.

== Route and halts ==
The important halts of the train are:

- Sawantwadi Road
- Madure
- Pernem
- Thivim
- Karmali
- Verna
- Majorda Junction
- Suravali
- Madgaon Junction

== Coach composite ==
The train has standard ICF rakes with max speed of 110 kmph. The train consists of 18 coaches:

- 16 General Unreserved
- 2 Seating cum Luggage Rake

== Traction ==
Both trains are hauled by a Golden Rock Loco Shed-based WDM-3A diesel locomotive from Sawantwadi to Madgaon and vice versa.

== Rake sharing ==
The train shares its rake with 50105/50106 Diva–Sawantwadi Passenger and 50119/50120 Dadar Central–Ratnagiri Passenger.

== See also ==
- Sawantwadi Road railway station
- Madgaon Junction railway station
- Diva–Panvel Passenger
- Sindhudurg Passenger
