= Goregaon Road railway station =

Railway station in Maharashtra, India

Goregaon Road

General information
- Coordinates: 18.1630°N 73.3028°E
- Owner: Indian Railways
- Line: Konkan Railway
- Platforms: 2
- Tracks: 2

Services
Preceding station	Indian Railways	Following station
Mangaon towards Roha	Konkan Railway Konkan Railway	Veer towards Thokur
Route map
Location
- Location within India Location within Maharashtra

Goregaon Road railway station is a halt station on the Konkan Railway. It is located 40.8 kilometres (25.4 mi) from the start of the line at Kolad. The preceding station on the line is Mangaon railway station, also a halt, and the next station is Veer railway station.
