= Bhoke railway station =

Railway Station in Maharashtra, India

Bhoke

General information
- Coordinates: 17.049°N 73.381°E
- Owner: Indian Railways
- Line: Konkan Railway

Other information
- Status: Active
- Station code: BOKE
- Fare zone: Konkan Railway

Services
Preceding station	Indian Railways	Following station
Ukshi towards Roha	Konkan Railway Konkan Railway	Ratnagiri towards Thokur
Route map
Location
- Location within India Location within Maharashtra

Bhoke railway station is a station on the Konkan Railway. It is located at a distance of 196.432 km (122.1 mi) from the origin at the north side, i.e., Roha railway station, which marks the end of the jurisdiction of the Central Railway zone of Indian Railways. The preceding station on the line is Ukshi railway station, and the next station is Ratnagiri railway station. There is a 6.5-kilometer-long tunnel known as Karbude Tunnel located on the Konkan Railway, situated between UKSHI and Bhoke station. Karbude Tunnel is the longest tunnel on the Konkan railway line. It remained India's longest rail tunnel until the Indian Government approved the planning and construction of the Pir Panjal Railway Tunnel. The Bhoke railway station on the Konkan railway track (line) lies between two railway tunnels.

The only trains that halt here are the Diva Sawantwadi Passenger and Diva Ratnagiri Passenger.
