= Nivasar railway station =

Railway Station in Maharashtra, India

निवसर

General information
- Coordinates: 16.9472°N 73.4549°E
- System: Regular
- Owner: Indian Railways
- Line: Konkan Railway
- Platforms: 1
- Tracks: 4

Construction
- Structure type: On Graund
- Parking: No
- Cycle facilities: No

Other information
- Status: Active
- Station code: NIV
- Fare zone: KR

Services
Preceding station	Indian Railways	Following station
Ratnagiri towards Roha	Konkan Railway Konkan Railway	Adavali towards Thokur
Route map
Location
- Location within India Location within Maharashtra

Nivasar railway station is a station on Konkan Railway. It is at a distance of 196.432 kilometres (122.1 mi) down from origin. The preceding station on the line towards Mumbai CSMT is Ratnagiri railway station and the next station towards Madgaon Junction is Adavali railway station.

The station offers free Wi-Fi.
