= Ukshi railway station =

Railway Station in Maharashtra, India

General information
- Coordinates: 17.1302°N 73.4569°E
- Owner: Indian Railways
- Line: Konkan Railway
- Platforms: 2
- Tracks: 2

Other information
- Status: Active
- Station code: UKC

Services
Preceding station	Indian Railways	Following station
Sangameshwar Road towards Roha	Konkan Railway Konkan Railway	Bhoke towards Thokur
Route map
Location
- Location within India Location within Maharashtra

Ukshi railway station is a station on the Konkan Railway in India. It is located between Sangameshwar Road and Bhoke 5 km east of District headquarters, 19 km from Ratnagiri, and 256 km from Mumbai. Ranpat Falls is nearby. Ukshi railway station is located 183.962 kilometre south of Roha railway station which is starting point for Konkan railway jurisdiction.

== Karbude tunnel ==
A 6.5 km-long tunnel known as the Karbude Tunnel is part of the railway. It is situated between Ukshi and Bhoke Stations. It is the line's longest tunnel. The Karbude Tunnel remained India's longest rail tunnel until the Pir Panjal Railway Tunnel surpassed it.
