= Sape Wamane railway station =

Railway Station in Maharashtra, India

General information
- Coordinates: 18.0582°N 73.3716°E
- System: Regular
- Owner: Indian Railways
- Line: Konkan Railway
- Platforms: 1
- Tracks: 2

Other information
- Status: Active
- Station code: SAPE

Services
Preceding station	Indian Railways	Following station
Veer towards Roha	Konkan Railway Konkan Railway	Karanjadi towards Thokur
Route map
Location
- Location within Maharashtra

Sape Wamane railway station is a halt station on Konkan Railway. It is at a distance of 55 kilometres (34 mi) down from origin at Roha station. The preceding station on the line is Veer railway station and the next station is Karanjadi railway station.
