= Kalamboli railway station =

Railway Station in Maharashtra, India

Kalamboli

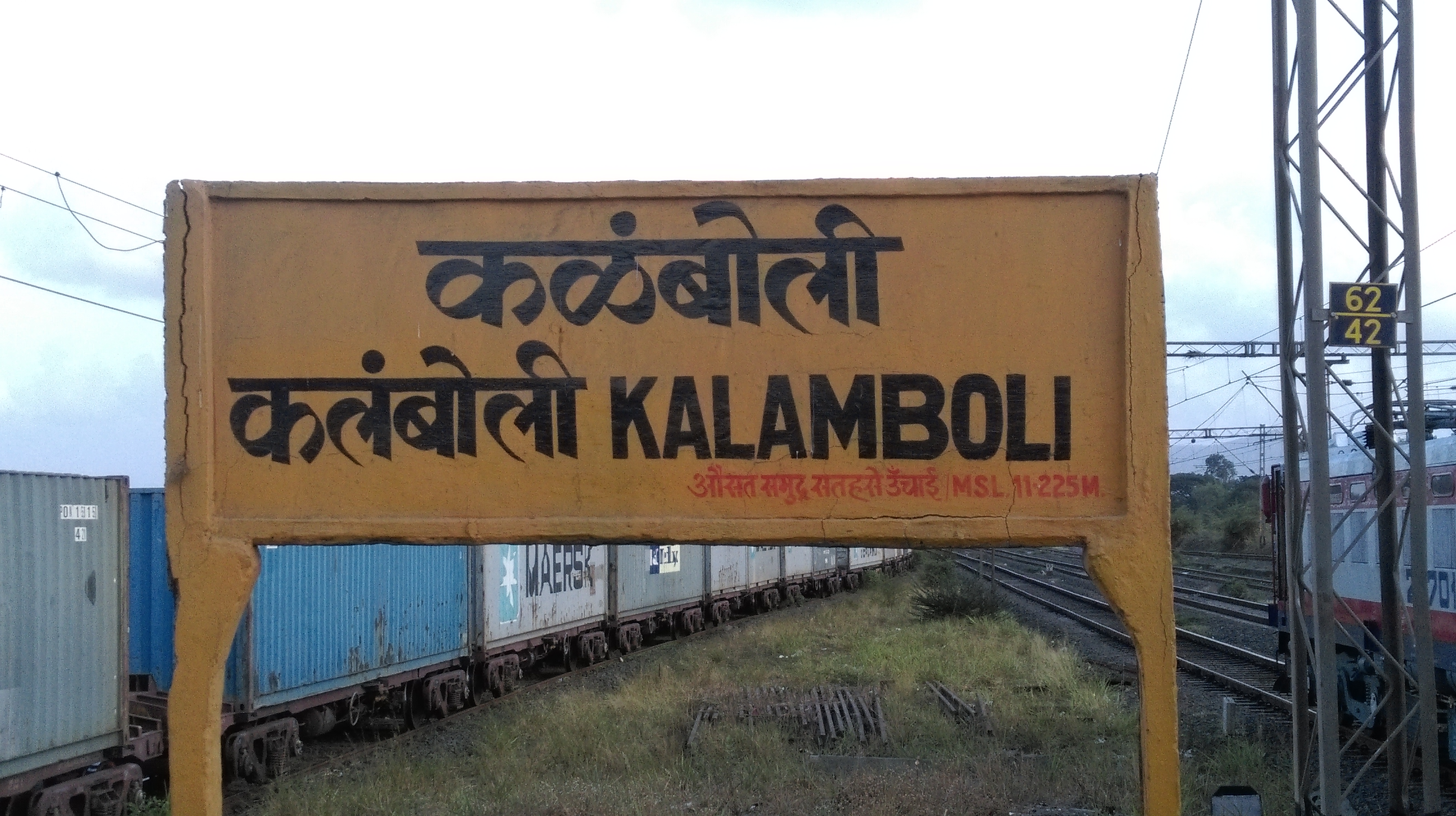

General information
- Location: Kalmboli Goods Yard, Navi Mumbai
- Coordinates: 19.03333°N 73.1°E
- Elevation: 11.225 metres (36.83 ft)
- System: Mumbai Suburban Railway station
- Owner: Ministry of Railways, Indian Railways
- Line: Vasai Road–Roha line
- Platforms: 2
- Tracks: 4

Construction
- Structure type: Standard on-ground station
- Parking: No
- Cycle facilities: No

Other information
- Status: Active
- Station code: KLMC
- Fare zone: Central Railways

History
- Opened: 1966
- Rebuilt: No

Services
Preceding station	Mumbai Suburban Railway	Following station
Navde Road towards Vasai Road	Vasai Road–Roha line	Panvel towards Roha
Route map
Location
- Location within India Location within Maharashtra Location within Mumbai

Kalamboli is a railway station on the Vasai Road–Diva–Panvel–Roha route of the Central Line, of the Mumbai Suburban Railway network in Navi Mumbai.

In September 2019, it was announced that the station would get a maintenance depot for the outstation terminus. In December 2025, some trains were halted due to the work.
