= Nandgaon Road railway station =

Railway Station in Maharashtra, India

Nandgaon Road

General information
- Coordinates: 16.3876°N 73.7306°E
- Owner: Indian Railways
- Line: Konkan Railway

Other information
- Status: Active
- Station code: NAN

Services
Preceding station	Indian Railways	Following station
Vaibhavwadi Road towards Roha	Konkan Railway Konkan Railway	Kankavli towards Thokur
Route map
Location
- Location within Maharashtra

Nandgaon Road railway station is a station on Konkan Railway. It is at a distance of 299.552 km (186.1 mi) down from origin. The preceding station on the line is Vaibhavwadi Road railway station and the next station is Kankavli railway station.
