= Zarap railway station =

Railway Station in Maharashtra, India

Zarap

General information
- Location: Zarap, Sindhudurg district, Maharashtra
- Coordinates: 15.9482°N 73.7341°E
- Owner: Indian Railways
- Line: Konkan Railway

Other information
- Status: Active
- Station code: ZARP
- Zone(s): Konkan Railways
- Division(s): Ratnagiri

Services
Preceding station	Indian Railways	Following station
Kudal towards Roha	Konkan Railway Konkan Railway	Sawantwadi Road towards Thokur
Route map
Location
- Location within India Location within Maharashtra

Zarap railway station is a train station on the Konkan Railway. It is at a distance of 353.300 km (219.5 mi) down from origin. The preceding station on the line is Kudal railway station and the next station is Sawantwadi Road railway station.
