= Kolad railway station =

Railway Station in Maharashtra, India

Kolad

General information
- Location: Mumbai - Goa Highway
- Coordinates: 18.3921°N 73.2234°E
- System: structure on graund
- Owner: Indian Railways
- Line: Konkan Railway
- Platforms: 2
- Tracks: 4

Other information
- Status: Active
- Station code: KOL
- Fare zone: Ratnagiri railway division

Services
Preceding station	Indian Railways	Following station
Roha Terminus	Konkan Railway Konkan Railway	Indapur towards Thokur
Route map
Location
- Location within India Location within Maharashtra

Kolad railway station is the first and north most railway station on the Konkan Railway Corporation Limited (KRCL). It is at a distance of 12.916 km down from Roha railway station which comes under Central Railway (CR) zone of Indian Railways (IR). The succeeding station is Indapur railway station, a halt station.

Kolad has one platform serving four halting trains each day. No trains originate from this station. It is located 80 km from Pune's Lohegaon airport. This station falls in the Ratnagiri Division of the State of Maharashtra in western coastal India.

Since 26 January 1999, The Konkan Railway is operating RO-RO (Roll ON-Roll-Off) services for loaded lorries (trucks) from Kolad railway station to Verna in Goa (417 km, 8–10 hours journey), Suratkal (721 km, 24 hours journey) in Karnataka, besides other regional routes.

Besides the railway station, Kolad is known for adventure sports, in particular white-water rafting.

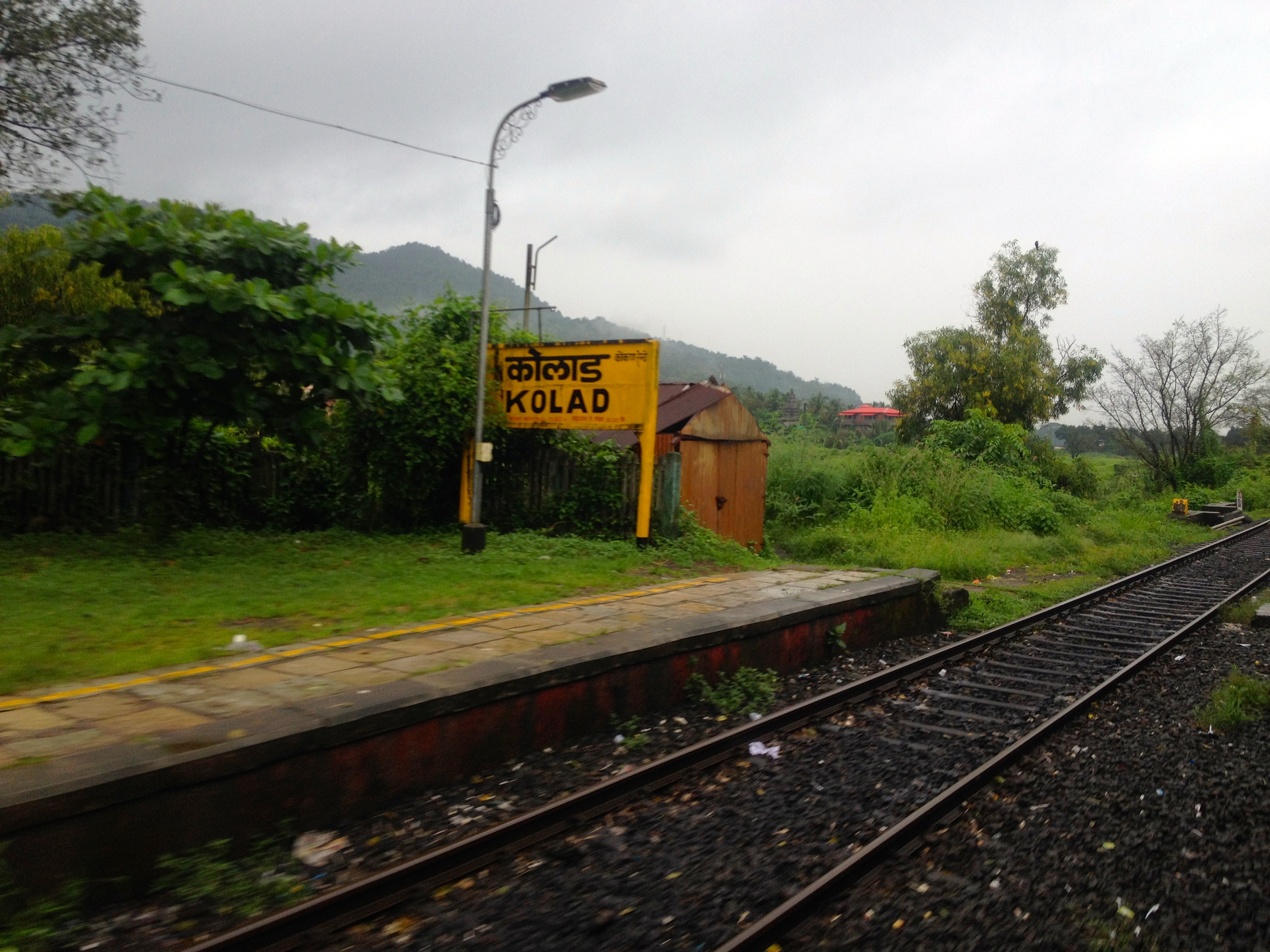
Kolad railway platform
