= Adavali railway station =

Railway station in Maharashtra, India

General information
- Coordinates: 16.9216°N 73.5929°E
- Owner: Indian Railways
- Line: Konkan Railway
- Platforms: 2
- Tracks: 2

Other information
- Status: Active
- Station code: ADVI

Services
Preceding station	Indian Railways	Following station
Nivasar towards Roha	Konkan Railway Konkan Railway	Vilavade towards Thokur
Route map
Location
- Location within Maharashtra

Adavali railway station is a station on Konkan Railway. It is at a distance of 235.28 km (146.2 mi) down from origin. The preceding station on the line is Nivasar railway station and the next station is Vilavade railway station.
