= Veer railway station =

Railway Station in Maharashtra, India

General information
- Location: National Highway-66, Mahad, Raigad PIN-402301.
- Coordinates: 18.1138°N 73.3303°E
- Owner: Indian Railways
- Line: Konkan Railway
- Platforms: 2
- Tracks: 2

Construction
- Depth: 6 m (20 ft)
- Parking: Yes

Other information
- Status: Active
- Station code: VEER
- Fare zone: KR/KONKAN

Services
Preceding station	Indian Railways	Following station
Goregaon Road towards Roha	Konkan Railway Konkan Railway	Sape Wamane towards Thokur
Route map
Location
- Location within India Location within Maharashtra

Veer railway station(Station code:Veer) located in Mahad taluka in Raigad is a station on Konkan Railway Corporation railway track. It serves villages including Dasgaon, Veer, Vahoor, Tempale, Lonere, and Mahad city. It is at a distance of 46.885 km (29.1 mi) down from Roha, northern starting point of Konkan Railway Corporation Limited. The preceding railway station on the north of Kokan railway line is Goregaon Road railway station (a halt station) and the next railway station on southern side is Karanjadi railway station (also a halt station). Veer railway station on Konkan Railway is the nearest railway station to industrial town of Mahad in Maharashtra state of India. Veer Railway station is adjacent to National Highway 66 (NH-66). As of 31 March 2026, Konkan Railway has double railway track between Roha and Veer.

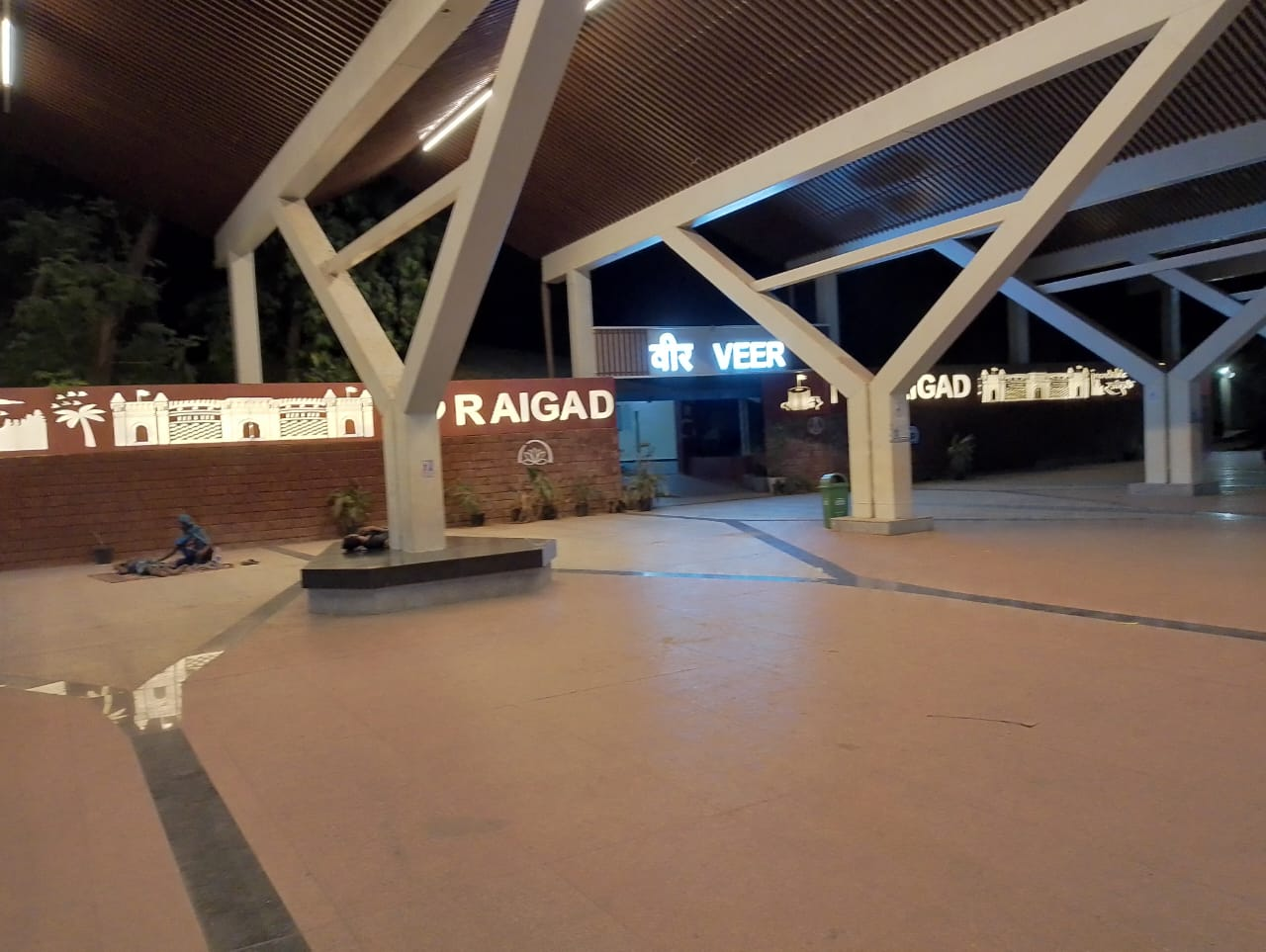
Veer railway station (KRCL) entrance from NH-66.
