= Vaibhavwadi Road railway station =

Railway Station in Maharashtra, India

Vaibhavwadi Road railway station वैभववाडी रोड

General information
- Location: Vaibhavwadi, Dist :- Sindhudurg
- Coordinates: 16.5122°N 73.7080°E
- System: Regular
- Owner: Indian Railways
- Line: Konkan Railway
- Platforms: 2
- Tracks: 3

Construction
- Structure type: standard on Ground Station

Other information
- Status: Active
- Station code: VBW
- Fare zone: Konkan Railway

Services
Preceding station	Indian Railways	Following station
Rajapur Road towards Roha	Konkan Railway Konkan Railway	Nandgaon Road towards Thokur
Route map
Location
- Location within Maharashtra

Vaibhavwadi railway station is a station on Konkan Railway. It is at a distance of 283.943 km (176.4 mi) down from origin. The preceding station on the line is Vilavade railway station and the next station is Nandgaon Road railway station.
