= Sawarda railway station =

Railway Station in Maharashtra, India

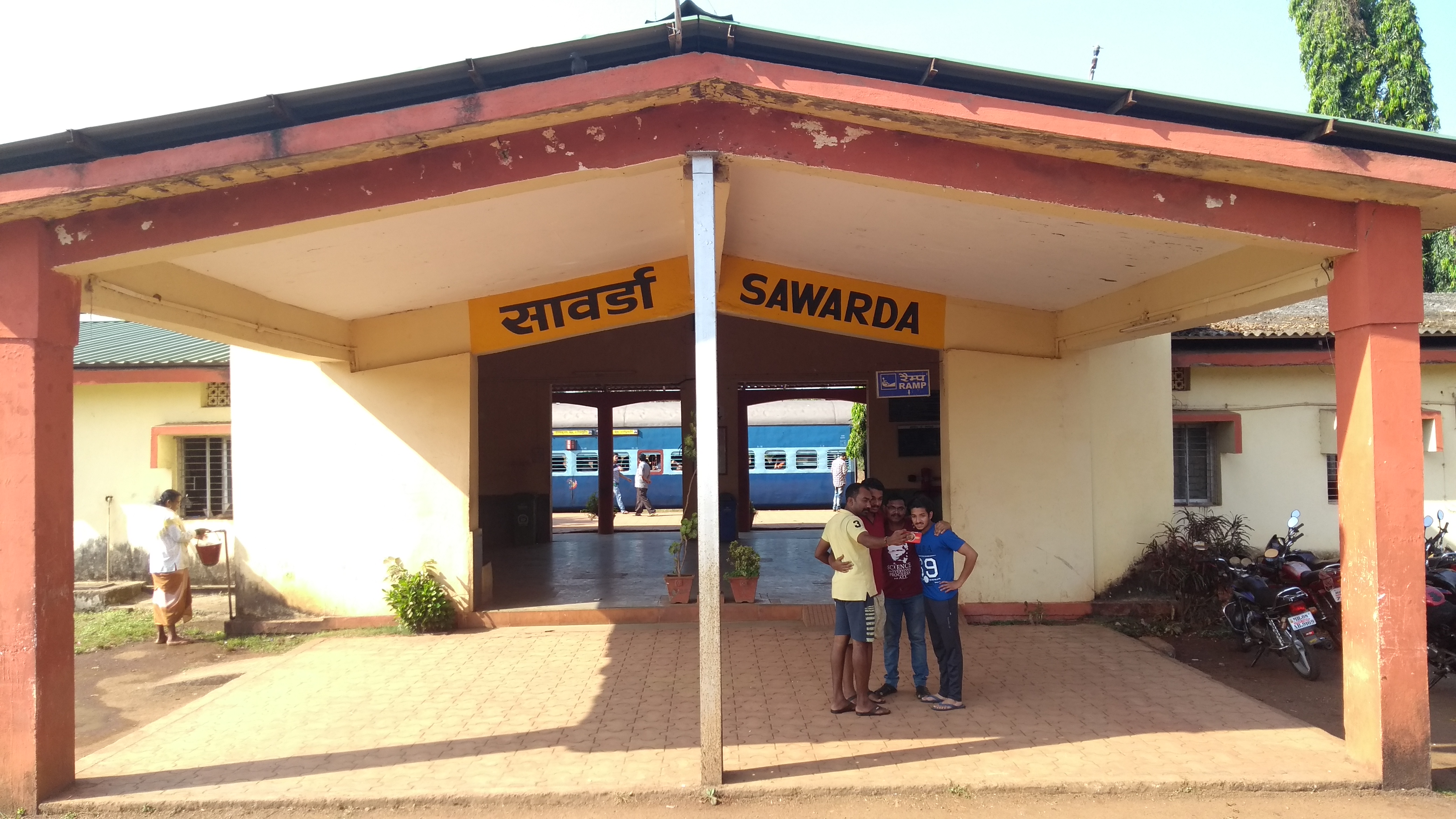

General information
- Coordinates: 17.4046°N 73.5151°E
- System: Indian Railways Station
- Owner: Indian Railways
- Line: Konkan Railway
- Platforms: 2
- Tracks: 3

Other information
- Status: Active
- Station code: SVX
- Fare zone: Konkan railway

Services
Preceding station	Indian Railways	Following station
Kamathe towards Roha	Konkan Railway Konkan Railway	Aravali towards Ratnagiri or Madgaon
Route map
Location
- Location within India Location within Maharashtra

Sawarda railway station is a station on Konkan Railway. It is at a distance of 146.302 kilometres (90.9 mi) down from origin at Roha station. The preceding station on the line is Kamathe railway station and the next station is Aravali railway station. The station has 2 platforms and 3 tracks. On the Main line towards Ratnagiri end there is a viaduct with a road under it.

== Platforms ==
The station has 2 platforms, Platform 1 and Platform 2. Platform 1 houses the station building and is elevated while Platform 2 is a ground platform.

== Amenities ==
The station features a range of amenities including:

- Parking
- Bus Stand
- Auto Stand
- Drinking water fountains
- Reserved and Unreserved Ticket offices
- Tea Stall
- Waiting area
- Passenger seating arrangements

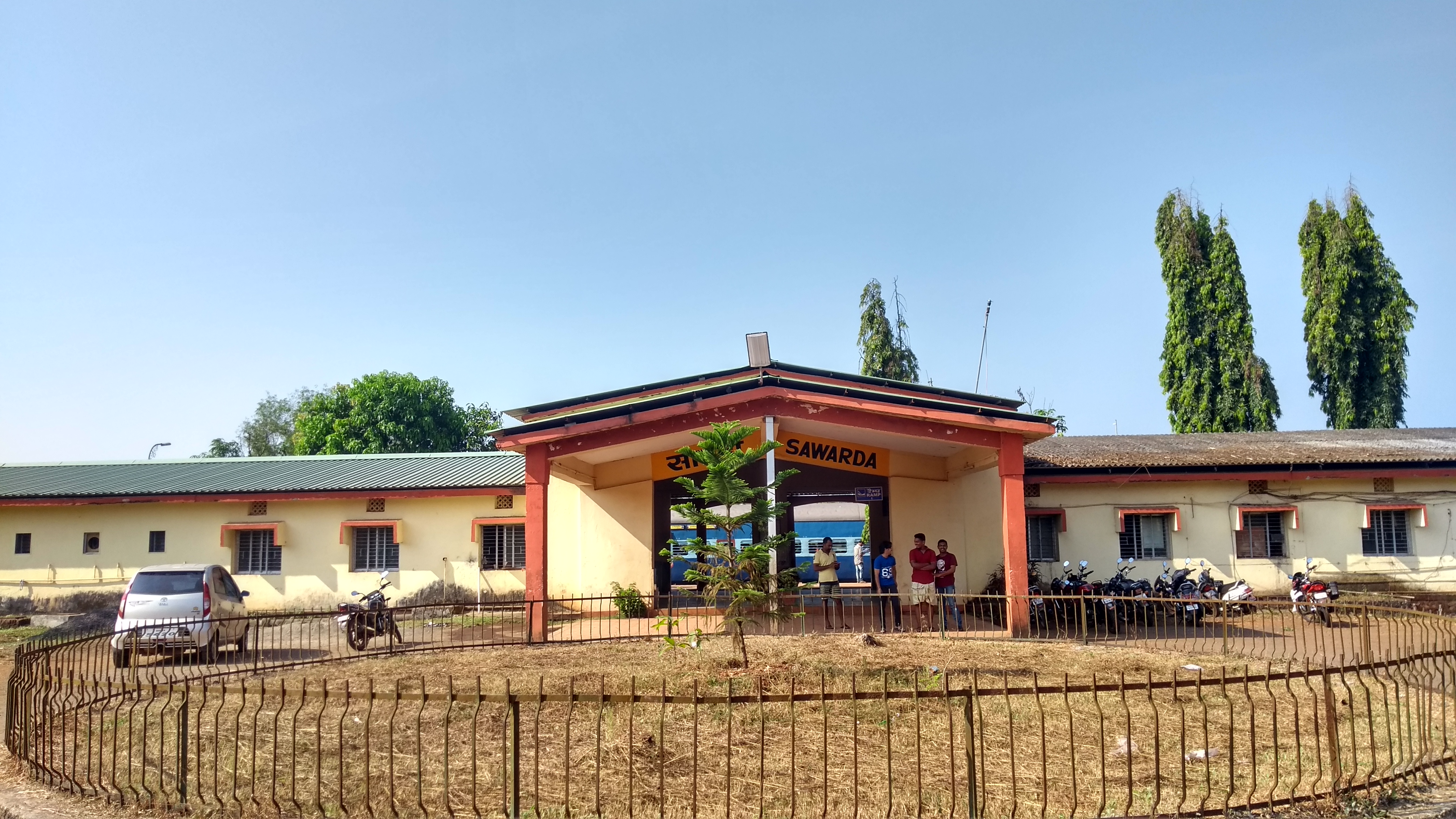
railway station
