= Vilavade railway station =

Railway station in India

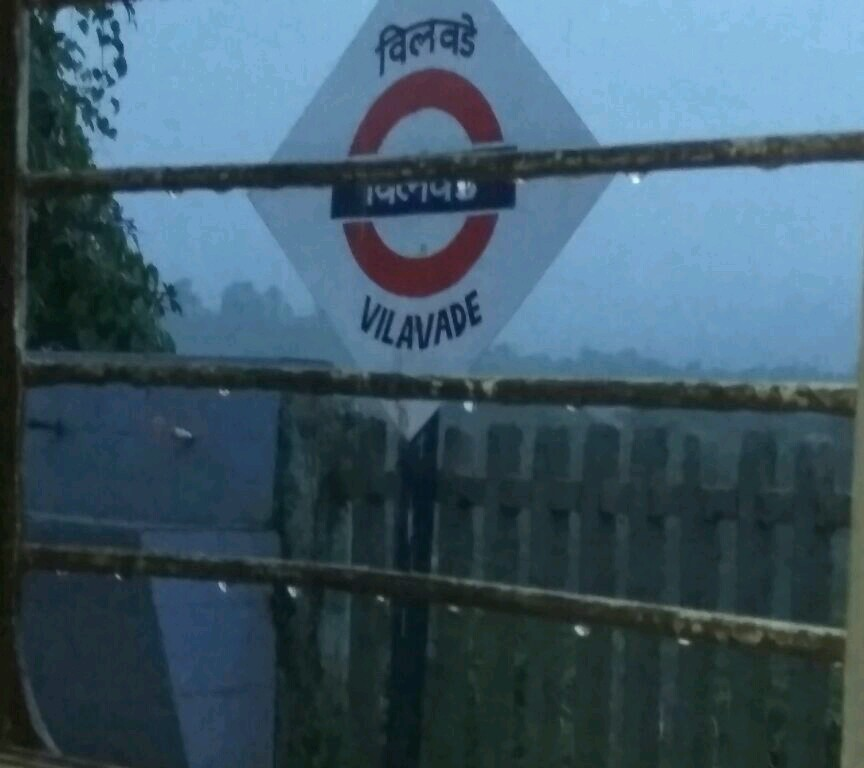

General information
- Coordinates: 16.7857°N 73.6192°E
- System: Indian Railways Station
- Owner: Indian Railways
- Line: Konkan Railway
- Platforms: 1
- Tracks: 1

Other information
- Status: Active
- Station code: VID

Services
Preceding station	Indian Railways	Following station
Adavali towards Roha	Konkan Railway Konkan Railway	Rajapur Road towards Thokur
Route map
Location
- Location within India Location within Maharashtra

Vilavade railway station is a station on Konkan Railway. The previous station on the line is Adavali railway station and the succeeding station is Rajapur Road railway station.
