= Karanjadi railway station =

Railway Station in Maharashtra, India

General information
- Coordinates: 17.998541°N 73.404484°E
- Owner: Indian Railways
- Line: Konkan Railway
- Platforms: 1
- Tracks: 2

Other information
- Status: Active
- Station code: KFD

Services
Preceding station	Indian Railways	Following station
Sape Wamane towards Roha	Konkan Railway Konkan Railway	Vinhere towards Thokur
Route map
Location
- Location within Maharashtra

Karanjadi railway station is a station on the Konkan Railway. It is 62.785 km (39.0 mi) down from railway terminus at Roha railway station. The preceding station on the line is Sape Wamane railway station, a halt station, and the next station is Vinhere railway station.
