= Kamathe railway station =

Railway Station in Maharashtra, India

General information
- Coordinates: 17.4779°N 73.5160°E
- Owner: Indian Railways
- Line: Konkan Railway
- Platforms: 1
- Tracks: 1

Other information
- Status: Active
- Station code: KMAH

Services
Preceding station	Indian Railways	Following station
Chiplun towards Roha	Konkan Railway Konkan Railway	Sawarda towards Thokur
Route map
Location
- Location within Maharashtra

Kamathe railway station is a station on Konkan Railway. It is at a distance of 137.646 km (85.5 mi) down from origin. The preceding station on the line is Chiplun railway station and the next station is Sawarda railway station. Kamathe village is in Chiplun taluka of Ratnagiri district, Maharashtra state, India.

Kamathe railway station with broadguage railway tracks was built by Konkan Railway Corporation Limited (KRCL) a public sector company of India.
