= Mangaon railway station =

Railway Station in Maharashtra, India

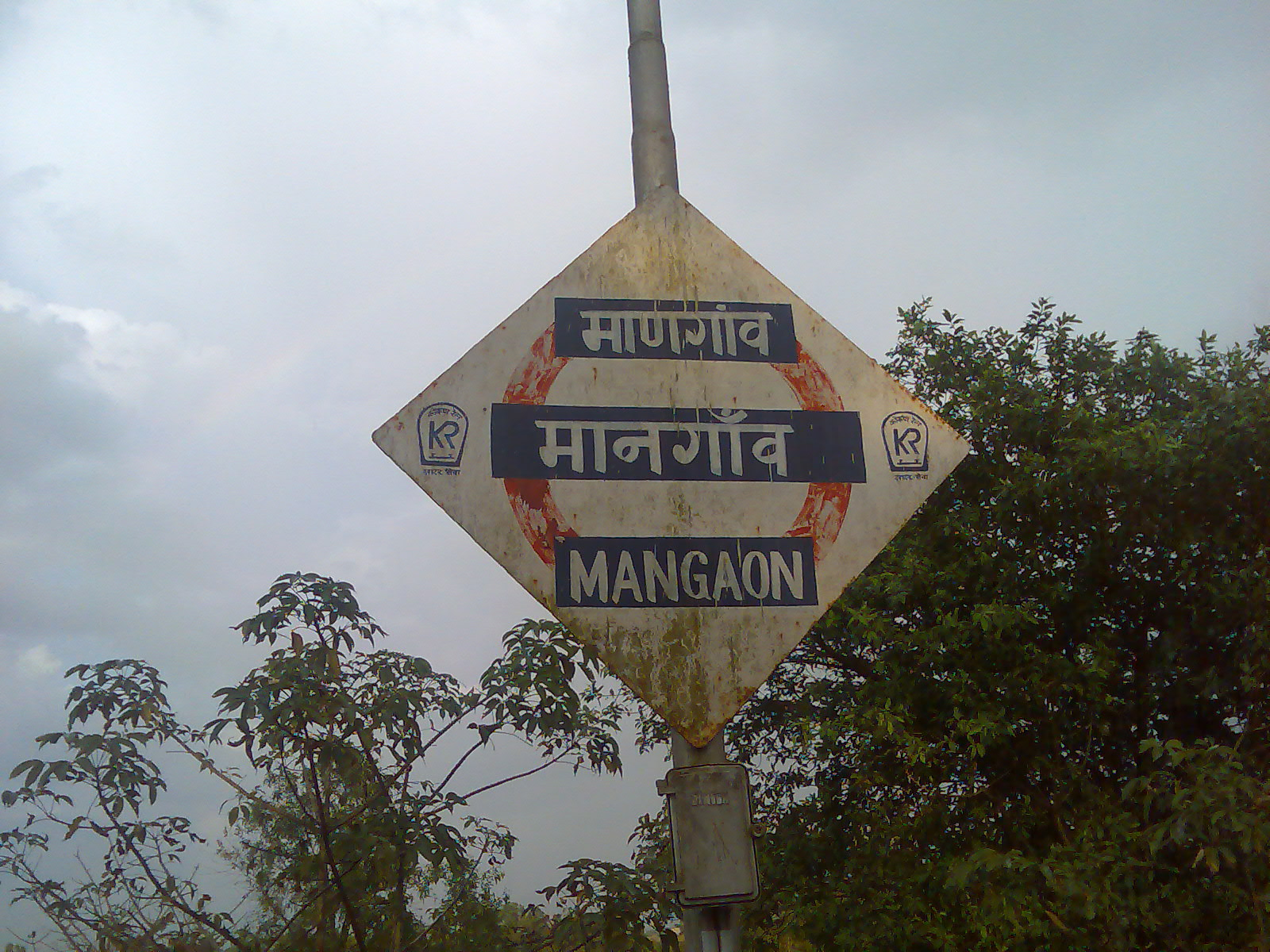

General information
- Coordinates: 18.2476°N 73.2756°E
- System: Indian Railways Station
- Owner: Indian Railways
- Line: Konkan Railway
- Platforms: 2

Other information
- Status: Active
- Station code: MNI
- Fare zone: konkan railway

Services
Preceding station	Indian Railways	Following station
Indapur towards Roha	Konkan Railway Konkan Railway	Goregaon Road towards Thokur
Route map
Location
- Location within India Location within Maharashtra

Mangaon railway station is a station on Konkan Railway serving the town of Mangaon in the Raigad district of Maharashtra. It is at a distance of 30.6 km (19.0 mi) down from origin. The previous station on the line is Indapur railway station, a halt station, and the succeeding station is Goregaon Road railway station, also a halt station.

The station offers free Wi-Fi.

== Trains ==
Besides several slow passenger trains, Express trains such as Mandovi Express, Konkan Kanya Express, Matsyagandha Express and Dadar Sawantwadi Road Rajya Rani Express have halts at Mangaon. There was a halt for Konkan kanya Express but post pandemic Konkan railway removed the halt of Konkan kanya express.
