= Aravali Road railway station =

Railway Station in Maharashtra, India

General information
- Coordinates: 17.3166°N 73.5381°E
- Owner: Indian Railways
- Line: Konkan Railway
- Platforms: 1
- Tracks: 2

Other information
- Status: Active
- Station code: AVRD

Services
| Preceding station | Indian Railways | Following station |
|---|---|---|
| Sawarda towards Roha | Konkan Railway Konkan Railway | Sangameshwar Road towards Thokur |
Route map
Location
- Location within India Location within Maharashtra

Aravali Road railway station is a station on Konkan Railway. It is at a distance of 156.414 km (97.2 mi) down from origin. The preceding station on the line is Sawarda railway station and the next station is Sangameshwar railway station.

The station offers free Wi-Fi. This railway station is approximately 4 km from NH 66 at Aravali village. It serves nearby villages of Kumbharkhani, Nandgaon, Yegaon, Makzhan, etc.
