= Kudal railway station =

Railway Station in Maharashtra, India

Kudal
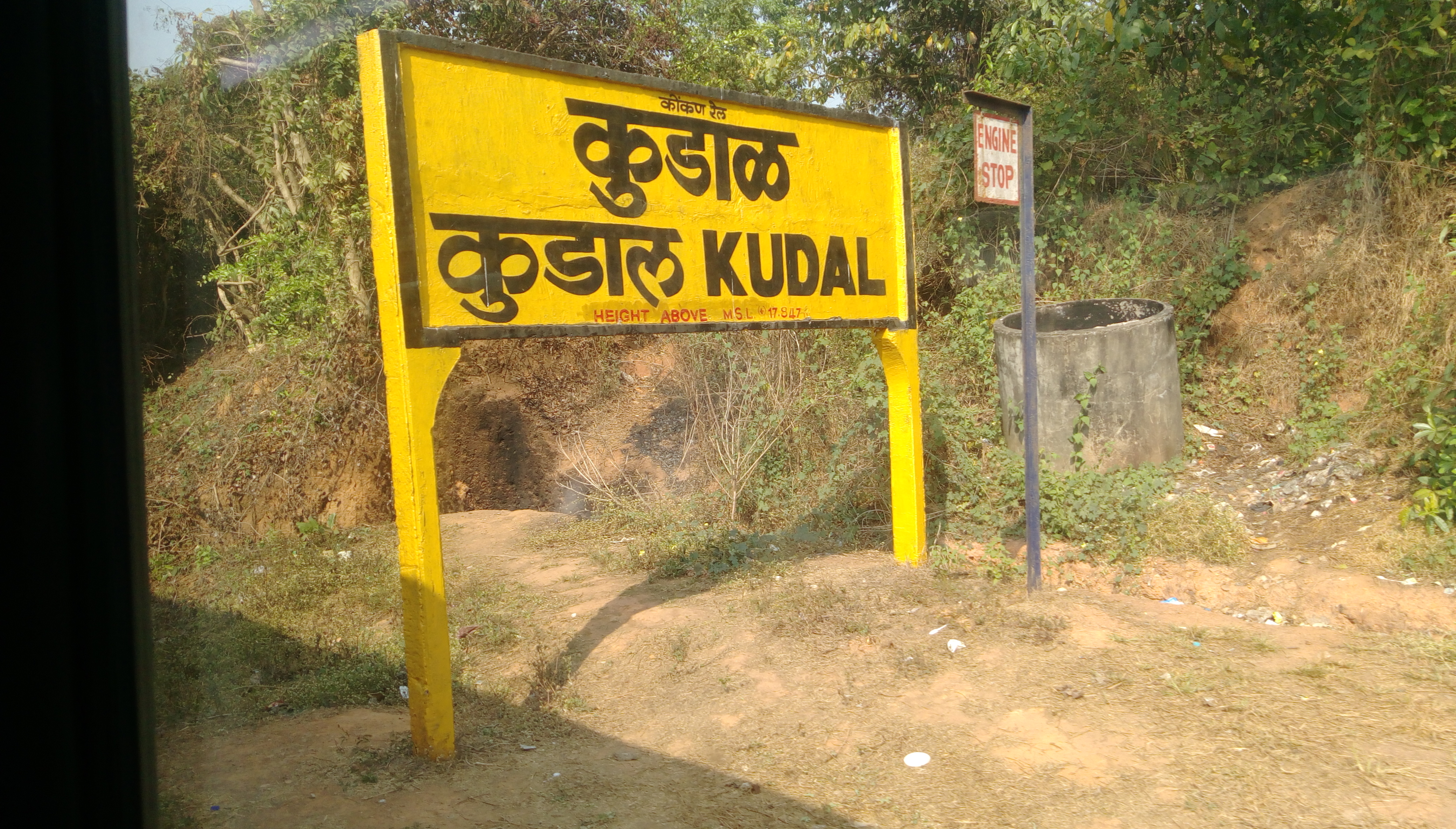
- View of platforms

General information
- Location: Kudal, Sindhudurg district, Maharashtra
- Coordinates: 16°01′02″N 73°40′41″E
- Elevation: 17.847 metres (58.55 ft)
- System: Konkan Railway station
- Owner: Ministry of Railways, Indian Railways
- Line: Konkan Railway
- Platforms: 2

Construction
- Structure type: Standard on-ground station

Other information
- Status: Active
- Station code: KUDL
- Fare zone: Konkan Railways

Services
Preceding station	Indian Railways	Following station
Sindhudurg towards Roha	Konkan Railway Konkan Railway	Zarap towards Thokur
Route map
Location
- Location within India Location within Maharashtra

Kudal railway station is a train station near the town of Kudal in the Indian state of Maharashtra. Kudal station lies on the Konkan Railway zone of Indian Railways that runs along the west coast of India. Kudal is an important station in the Konkan region with several trains stopping here daily. 39 trains halt at this station. Premium trains like Tejas Express stops here which runs between Mumbai and Karmali. There are daily trains to Mumbai like Konkan Kanya Express, Tutari Express and Mandovi Express. Train to the national capital Delhi is available on Monday and Sunday which is 22413 Mao-Nzm Rajdhani Express. Also, trains stopping at all stations like Diva-Sawantwadi Passenger and Ratnagiri–Madgaon Passenger halt here. Waiting rooms are available at pf 1. Ticket counter is present at pf 1.
