= Sangameshwar Road railway station =

Railway Station in Maharashtra, India

General information
- Location: Sangameshwar Taluka Dist Ratnagiri
- Coordinates: 17.2016°N 73.5463°E
- Owner: Indian Railways
- Line: Konkan Railway
- Platforms: 2
- Tracks: 4

Construction
- Structure type: On Ground

Other information
- Status: Active
- Station code: SGR
- Fare zone: Konkan Railway

Services
Preceding station	Indian Railways	Following station
Aravali towards Roha	Konkan Railway Konkan Railway	Ukshi towards Thokur
Route map
Location
- Location within India Location within Maharashtra

Sangameshwar Road railway station is a station on Konkan Railway. It is at a distance of 170.285 km (105.8 mi) down from origin. The preceding station on the line is Aravali railway station and the next station is Ukshi railway station. 6 regular trains stop at Sangameshwar Road Railway Station. Sangameshwarvasiy have demanded stops of 8 more regular trains and 1 special train.
