= Rajapur Road railway station =

Railway station in India

Rajapur Road

General information
- Location: Rajapur Dist:- Ratnagiri
- Coordinates: 16.6356°N 73.6268°E
- System: Regular
- Owner: Indian Railways
- Line: Konkan Railway
- Platforms: 2
- Tracks: 2

Construction
- Structure type: standard on Ground Station

Other information
- Status: Functioning
- Station code: RAJP
- Fare zone: Konkan Railway

Services
| Preceding station | Indian Railways | Following station |
|---|---|---|
| Saundal towards Roha | Konkan Railway Konkan Railway | Kharepatan towards Thokur |
Route map
Location
- Location within Maharashtra

Rajapur Road railway station (Station code:RAJP) is a railway (train) station on Konkan Railway Corporation Limited built railway (railroad) track from Roha in Maharashtra state to Thokur in Karnataka state via Goa state. It is at a distance of 267.349 km (166.1 mi) down from origin. The preceding station on the line is Saundal railway station and the next station is Kharepatan going south towards Surathkal near Mangaluru. It is the nearest rail station to historical Rajapur town.

The railway station has only one track and platform. Only five trains per day halt at station, three Express trains and two Passengers trains. The station is built in a dug section of hill, so one has to climb down from the station to the platform. During Ganapati festival, some special trains do stop at Rajapur road train station for people to go to their native place.

- Konkan Kanya Express Mumbai C.S.M.T–Madgaon-Mumbai C.S.M.T
- Mandovi Express Mumbai C.S.M.T–Madgaon-Mumbai C.S.M.T
- Tutari Express Dadar–Sawantwadi Road–Dadar
- Sindhudurg Passenger Diva Junction–Sawantwadi–Diva Junction
- Ratnagiri–Madgaon Passenger
