= Sawantwadi Road railway station =

Railway Station in Maharashtra, India

Sawantwadi Road (Proposed: Lokmanya Madhu Dandavate Railway Terminus)

General information
- Location: State Highway 123, Niravade Village, Sindhudurg District, Sawantwadi, Maharashtra; India
- Coordinates: 15.8666°N 73.7852°E
- Elevation: 40 m (130 ft)
- System: Terminus / Regular Halting
- Line: Konkan Railway
- Distance: 363.88 km (226.10 mi) from Roha
- Platforms: 3
- Tracks: 4

Construction
- Structure type: At-grade

Other information
- Status: Active
- Station code: SWV
- Fare zone: Konkan Railway (Ratnagiri Division)

History
- Opened: 1998
Location

Sawantwadi Road railway station (Station code: SWV) sits on the Konkan Railway line in Niravade village, Sindhudurg district, Maharashtra, serving the nearby town of Sawantwadi. It lies 363.88 kilometres (226.1 mi) down the line from Roha. Since September 2026 it has been the terminus of a daily express from Mumbai CSMT.

== History and Naming Proposal ==
The station opened in 1998, as the Konkan Railway route was completed in phases.

The Maharashtra State Cabinet approved a resolution in May 2026 to rename the station the Lokmanya Madhu Dandavate Railway Terminus, a tribute to the socialist leader and former Railway Minister credited with sanctioning the line's early phases in the late 1970s. The renaming still needs sign-off from the Central Ministry of Home Affairs and the Ministry of Railways.

== Terminal Expansion and Challenges ==
Then-Railway Minister Suresh Prabhu and Chief Minister Devendra Fadnavis laid the foundation stone on 27 June 2015 for upgrading Sawantwadi Road from a wayside halt into a full terminus, with stabling lines, terminal platforms, and wash lines meant to let trains originate and terminate in southern Maharashtra rather than run through to Madgaon in Goa.

=== Terminal Building and Approach Road ===
Konkan Railway's Phase-II plans include a train watering arrangement, a passenger terminal building, and an approach road linking the site to the local road network. Citizens' groups say the water supply piece has stalled — a proposal to draw water from the Tilari Dam has sat pending — and were pressing in November 2025 for it and the rest of the terminal work to move forward. As of early November 2026, the terminus project was still unfinished.

The terminal has been slow to materialize for a few reasons:

- Funding: Konkan Railway Corporation is an independent public sector undertaking with revenues that have historically fallen short of what its infrastructure needs demand, squeezing the capital available for a project like the Sawantwadi terminus. That shortfall is part of why the Maharashtra government has backed folding KRCL into Indian Railways, which would open the route to central funding.
- Stoppages lost in the pandemic: The Rajdhani Express and Garib Rath Express both lost their Sawantwadi Road halts during COVID-19 and hadn't been restored as of late 2025, a sore point that drove sustained protest before the halts finally returned in July 2026.
- Amenities: Incomplete platform roofing and the unresolved water supply have been recurring complaints from commuters.
- Additional platform and loop line: Local reports in November 2026 noted that work on an additional platform and a loop line had still not begun, even though open land is available next to platform 3. The Konkan Railway Passengers Association has raised the issue repeatedly, and passengers have asked why the work has stalled.

=== Recently Restored and New Stoppages ===
The Ministry of Railways announced on 24 July 2026 that three pairs of trains would stop at Sawantwadi Road on an experimental basis, after Maharashtra CM Devendra Fadnavis pressed Union Railway Minister Ashwini Vaishnaw on the issue earlier in the year. Being experimental, these halts could still be dropped depending on how passengers respond:

- Train Nos. 12133/12134 (Mumbai CSMT–Mangaluru Junction Superfast Express, daily) – arrives at Sawantwadi Road at 7:02 a.m. and departs 7:04 a.m. heading down; the return trip arrives 11:30 p.m., departing 11:32 p.m.
- Train Nos. 12431/12432 (Hazrat Nizamuddin–Thiruvananthapuram Central tri-weekly Rajdhani Express)
- Train Nos. 12201/12202 (Mumbai LTT–Thiruvananthapuram North bi-weekly Garib Rath Express)

Separately, the Ministry of Railways approved a new daily express between Chhatrapati Shivaji Maharaj Terminus (CSMT) and Sawantwadi Road on 1 August 2026. Vaishnaw flagged off the service, numbered 15087/15088, on 3 September 2026. Regular daily running began from CSMT on 8 September. In the monsoon timetable the train leaves CSMT at 23:55 and reaches Sawantwadi Road at 13:50 the next day; from 21 October 2026 the arrival moves to 14:15.

== Strategic Tourism Importance ==
Sawantwadi Road functions as a gateway into the South Konkan and North Goa tourism belt, putting heritage sites, hill stations, and beaches within reach of anyone stepping off the train.

=== Cultural and Heritage Tourism ===
Sawantwadi town, 6 km from the station, is home to the 18th-century Sawantwadi Palace — a former royal residence overlooking Moti Talao lake, now housing a museum and artisan workshops. Ganjifa playing cards and traditional lacquerware are practiced here, alongside the wooden toy tradition kept alive by artisans at Chitarali and sold through the government-backed Shilpgram craft village.

=== Eco-Tourism and Hill Stations ===
Amboli Ghat, about 28 km away in the Sahyadri range, uses this station as its main railhead. The hill station is a recognised biodiversity hotspot in the Western Ghats, nicknamed the "Cherrapunji of Maharashtra" for its monsoon rainfall, and known for waterfalls including the Amboli Waterfall and Kavlesad Point.

=== Coastal and Cross-Border Inter-Connectivity ===
Sitting close to the Maharashtra–Goa border, the station puts beaches on both sides of the state line within reach:

- South Sindhudurg's quieter beaches, including Shiroda Beach, Velagar, and the historic Yashwantgad Fort at Redi.
- Tarkarli's water sports scene and the offshore Sindhudurg Fort at Malvan.
- North Goa's less crowded stretches around Querim (Keri) and Arambol, under an hour's drive south.

Konkan Railway and the Maharashtra Tourism Development Corporation jointly built a Railotel near the station to capture some of this traffic — a 39-room budget hotel on a 5,000-square-metre site, its foundation stone laid by Union Minister Suresh Prabhu. The ₹14-crore project includes restaurants, general and VIP lounges, an internet café, a booking counter, basic medical facilities, a meeting hall, a library, and a gym.

== Role of Local Organizations & Future Hub Vision ==
Two grassroots bodies have pushed hardest for the terminus and better services: the Konkan Railway Passengers Association (Konkan Railway Pravasi Sanghatana) and the Akhand Konkan Railway Pravasi Seva Samiti.

=== Flagship Station Ambition ===
Regional advocacy has focused heavily on fixing a lopsided pattern along the Konkan route: Panvel, Ratnagiri, and Madgaon each function as consolidated hubs where nearly every train stops, but Sindhudurg district had no equivalent. Sawantwadi Road is, in practical terms, the last major Maharashtra station before the line crosses into Goa — the smaller Madure halt sits about 10 km further south and is technically the final station in the state, though it has just one platform and minimal service. Advocacy groups point to that position, Maharashtra's outsized financial stake in the Konkan Railway project, and Sindhudurg's tourism draw as grounds for giving Sawantwadi Road all-halt status — the Konkan Railway Passenger Service Committee has framed this in terms of the state's 22 per cent equity stake against what it calls a thin slate of dedicated services. The underlying argument from local groups is straightforward: finish the terminal infrastructure, and Sawantwadi Road becomes the district's natural rail hub.

=== 2026 Hunger Strike Protest ===
The Konkan Railway Passenger Service Committee announced a token hunger strike outside Konkan Railway's Belapur headquarters for 15 August 2026, over what it sees as an unfair split between Maharashtra's stake in the project and what it gets back in service. Despite the 22 per cent equity figure, the committee pointed out, Maharashtra has just three dedicated services on the route — the Diva–Sawantwadi Passenger, the Diva–Ratnagiri Passenger, and the Tutari Express — and flagged the recurring scramble for confirmed tickets during the Ganesh festival rush from Mumbai.

Among the committee's longstanding demands: a full-fledged terminus at Sawantwadi Road, and new Vasai–Sawantwadi and Kalyan–Sawantwadi passenger services. Railway officials countered that the Konkan Railway's single line limits how much capacity can be added regardless, pointing to 256 special trains laid on for the 2026 festive season as evidence of effort.

== Train Services ==
The station handles daily regional expresses, Mumbai-bound originating services, and a handful of weekly long-distance halts.

=== Trains Originating / Terminating ===
- Tutari Express (11003/11004) – Daily, runs directly to Dadar in Mumbai.
- Sawantwadi Road–Diva Express (10105/10106) – Daily, known locally as the Sindhudurg Express; connects to Diva Junction in Thane.
- Sawantwadi Road–Madgaon Passenger (50107/50108) – Daily local shuttle down into Goa.
- Chhatrapati Shivaji Maharaj Terminus–Sawantwadi Road Express (15087/15088) – Daily; in service since September 2026.

=== Daily Halting Services ===
- Jan Shatabdi Express (12051/12052) – Daily high-speed daytime service to Madgaon Junction.
- Konkan Kanya Express (20111/20112) – Daily overnight superfast to Madgaon Junction.
- Mandovi Express (10103/10104) – Daily daytime express to Madgaon Junction.
- Mumbai CSMT–Mangaluru Junction Superfast Express (12133/12134) – Daily; picked up an experimental halt in July 2026.

=== Non-Daily / Weekly Halting Services ===
- Bandra Terminus–Madgaon Express (10115/10116) – Weekly.
- Madgaon–Lokmanya Tilak Terminus Express (11099/11100) – Four days a week.
- Pune–Ernakulam Superfast Express (22149/22150) – Bi-weekly.
- Vasco da Gama–Patna Express (12741/12742) – Weekly.
- Gandhidham–Nagercoil Express (16335/16336) – Weekly.
- Hazrat Nizamuddin–Thiruvananthapuram Central Rajdhani Express (12431/12432) – Tri-weekly; experimental halt from July 2026.
- Lokmanya Tilak Terminus–Thiruvananthapuram North Garib Rath Express (12201/12202) – Bi-weekly; experimental halt from July 2026.

== Connectivity and Amenities ==
Three platforms, four broad-gauge tracks, and the basics: computerized reservation counters, waiting halls, refreshment stalls. Sawantwadi town itself is about 6 km off, so getting there means an MSRTC bus or one of the auto-rickshaws waiting outside.

== Services ==
Preceding Station	Unique Route	Next Station
Zarap towards Roha / Mumbai	Konkan Railway; Indian Railways	Madure towards Thokur / Mangaluru
