= Kankavli railway station =

Railway station on Konkan Railways

Kankavli
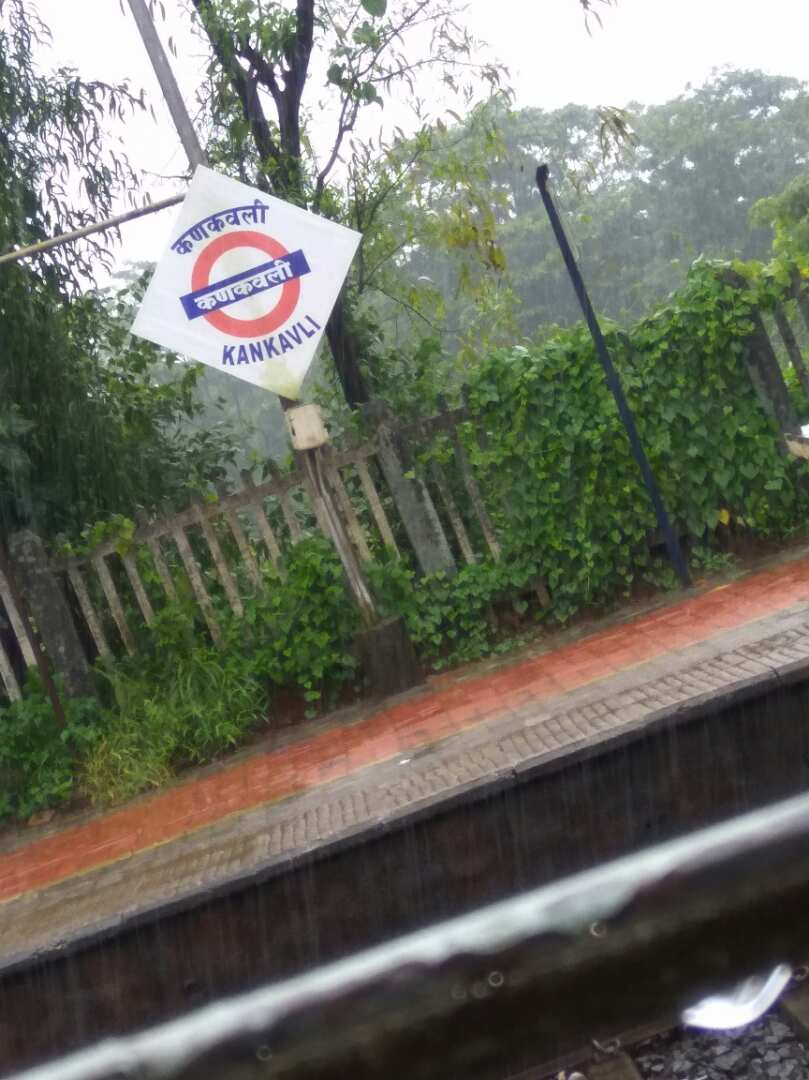

General information
- Location: Kankavli, Sindhudurg district, Maharashtra
- Coordinates: 16°15′32″N 73°43′12″E
- System: Indian Railways Station
- Owner: Indian Railways
- Line: Konkan Railway
- Platforms: 2
- Tracks: 4

Construction
- Structure type: standard on Ground Station
- Parking: yes

Other information
- Status: Active
- Station code: KKW
- Zone(s): Konkan Railways
- Division(s): Ratnagiri

Services
| Preceding station | Indian Railways | Following station |
|---|---|---|
| Nandgaon Road towards Roha | Konkan Railway Konkan Railway | Sindhudurg towards Thokur |
Route map
Location
- Location within India Location within Maharashtra

Kankavli railway station is a major train station located in the city of Kankavli on Konkan Railways. It is at a distance of 314.951 km (195.7 mi) down from origin. The preceding station on the line is Nandgaon Road railway station and the next station is Sindhudurg railway station. The station offers free Wi-Fi.
