= Sindhudurg railway station =

Railway station in Maharashtra, India

Sindhudurg

General information
- Location: Sindhudurg, Sindhudurg district, Maharashtra
- Coordinates: 16.1122°N 73.6799°E
- System: Regular
- Owner: Indian Railways
- Line: Konkan Railway
- Platforms: 2
- Tracks: 5

Construction
- Structure type: standard on Ground Station

Other information
- Status: Active
- Station code: SNDD
- Zone(s): Konkan Railways
- Division(s): Ratnagiri

Services
Preceding station	Indian Railways	Following station
Kankavli towards Roha	Konkan Railway Konkan Railway	Kudal towards Thokur
Route map
Location
- Location within Maharashtra

Sindhudurg railway station is a train station on the Konkan Railway. Sindhudurg railway station is located at Sindhudurg revenue district of Maharashtra state, Republic of India.It is the nearest railway station to district headquarters Oros, Sindhudurg.It is at a distance of 332.560 km (206.6 mi) down from origin. The preceding station on the line is Kankavli railway station and the next station is Kudal railway station.
