= Ratnagiri railway station =

Railway Station in Maharashtra, India

Ratnagiri
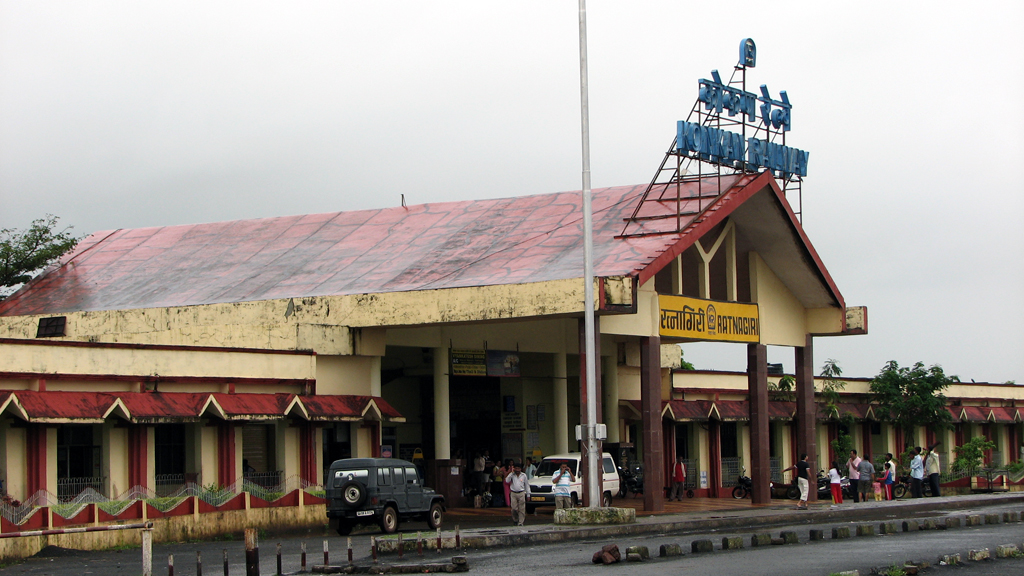
- Ratnagiri railway station building

General information
- Location: Ratnagiri, Ratnagiri district, Maharashtra
- Coordinates: 17.003441°N 73.358159°E
- Elevation: 125.000 metres (410.105 ft)
- System: Regional rail and Light rail station
- Owner: Indian Railways
- Line: Konkan Railway
- Platforms: 3
- Tracks: 6

Construction
- Structure type: Standard on-ground station
- Parking: yes
- Cycle facilities: yes

Other information
- Status: Active
- Station code: RN
- Fare zone: Central Railways

History
- Opened: yes
- Closed: no

Services
Preceding station	Indian Railways	Following station
Bhoke Panvel towards Roha	Konkan Railway Konkan Railway	Nivasar Madgaon Junction towards Thokur
Route map
Location
- Location within India Location within Maharashtra

Ratnagiri railway station (RN) is a train station that serves the city of Ratnagiri in the Indian state of Maharashtra. It is one of the main railway stations of the Konkan Railway. The station has modern facilities like elevator and escalator. The station offers free Wi-Fi. All Konkan Railway trains halt at Ratnagiri. It is 7 km away from the city. It falls under the Ratnagiri railway division. Platform 1 is used for South India bound trains, platform 2 for North India bound trains and platform 3 is used for trains starting/terminating their journey at the railway station. Platform 3 may sometimes be used by platform 2 trains, if the track switch is set to platform 3. However, it rarely happens.

== Administration ==
Ratnagiri railway station was built and is operated and maintained by Konkan Railway Corporation Limited, a public sector company as of 20 May 2026. Ratnagiri train station lies on the Konkan Railway railway tracks that runs along the west coast of Republic of India approximately parallel to Arabian sea.

== Services ==
The railway station has the daily connectivity to important cities of India like – Mumbai, New Delhi, Amritsar, Jaipur, Ahmedabad, Mangalore, Coimbatore, Ernakulam.

Thiruvananthapuram Rajdhani Express and Madgaon Rajdhani Express connect with Hazrat Nizamuddin railway station in New Delhi along with other trains like Mangala Lakshadweep Express, Kerala Sampark Kranti Express and Goa Sampark Kranti Express.

Other trains include Tirunelveli–Gandhidham Humsafar Express, Marusagar Express, Kochuveli–Shri Ganganagar Junction Express, Kochuveli–Lokmanya Tilak Terminus Garib Rath Express, Netravati Express, Konkan Kanya Express, Mandovi Express, Matsyagandha Express, Tutari Express, Mumbai CSMT–Karmali Tejas Express, Dadar–Madgaon Jan Shatabdi Express, Tirunelveli-Gandhidham Humsafar Express, Madgaon–Mumbai CSMT Vande Bharat Express connect Madgaon to Mumbai.

All the seasonal summer special trains, Ganesh Chaturthi special trains, and Christmas special trains halt at Ratnagiri railway station.

The railway station has many amenities, such as escalators and lifts on each platforms, as well as handicap-friendly environment and access.

There is also a goods yard on the west side of rail station. A passenger coach depot is also being built adjoining to the station.

== Gallery ==
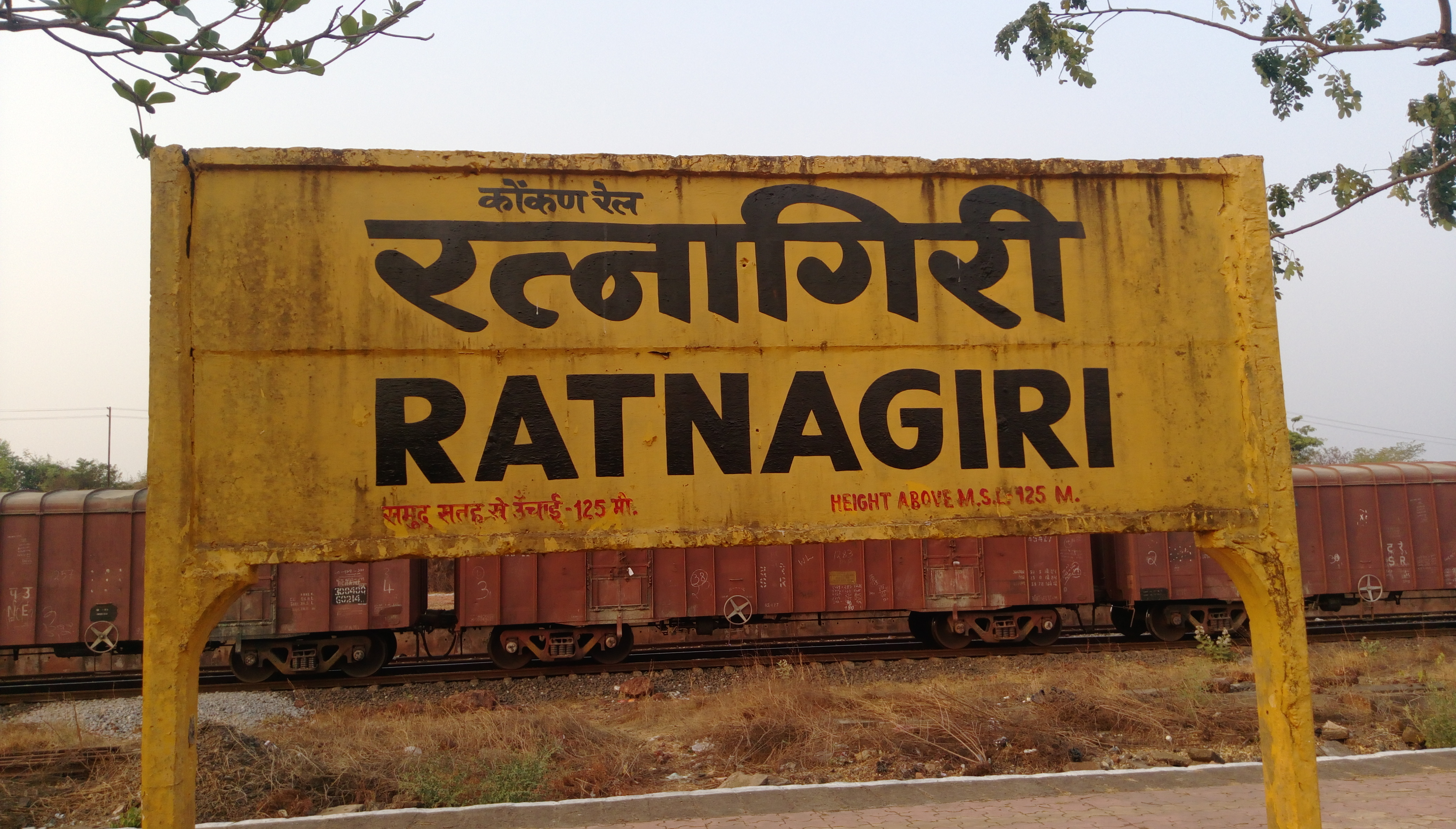
Ratnagiri railway station - Stationboard

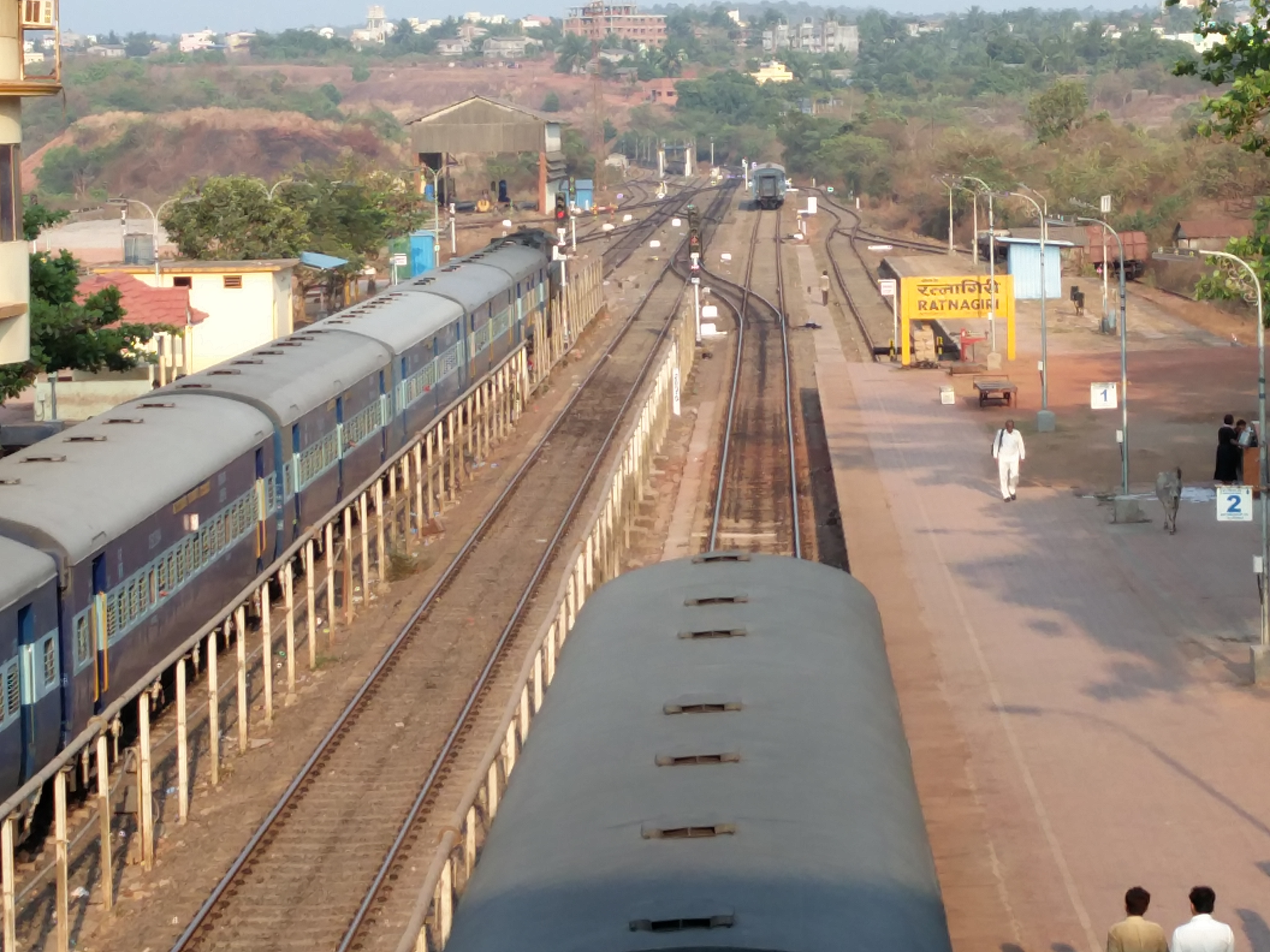
Ratnagiri railway station platform

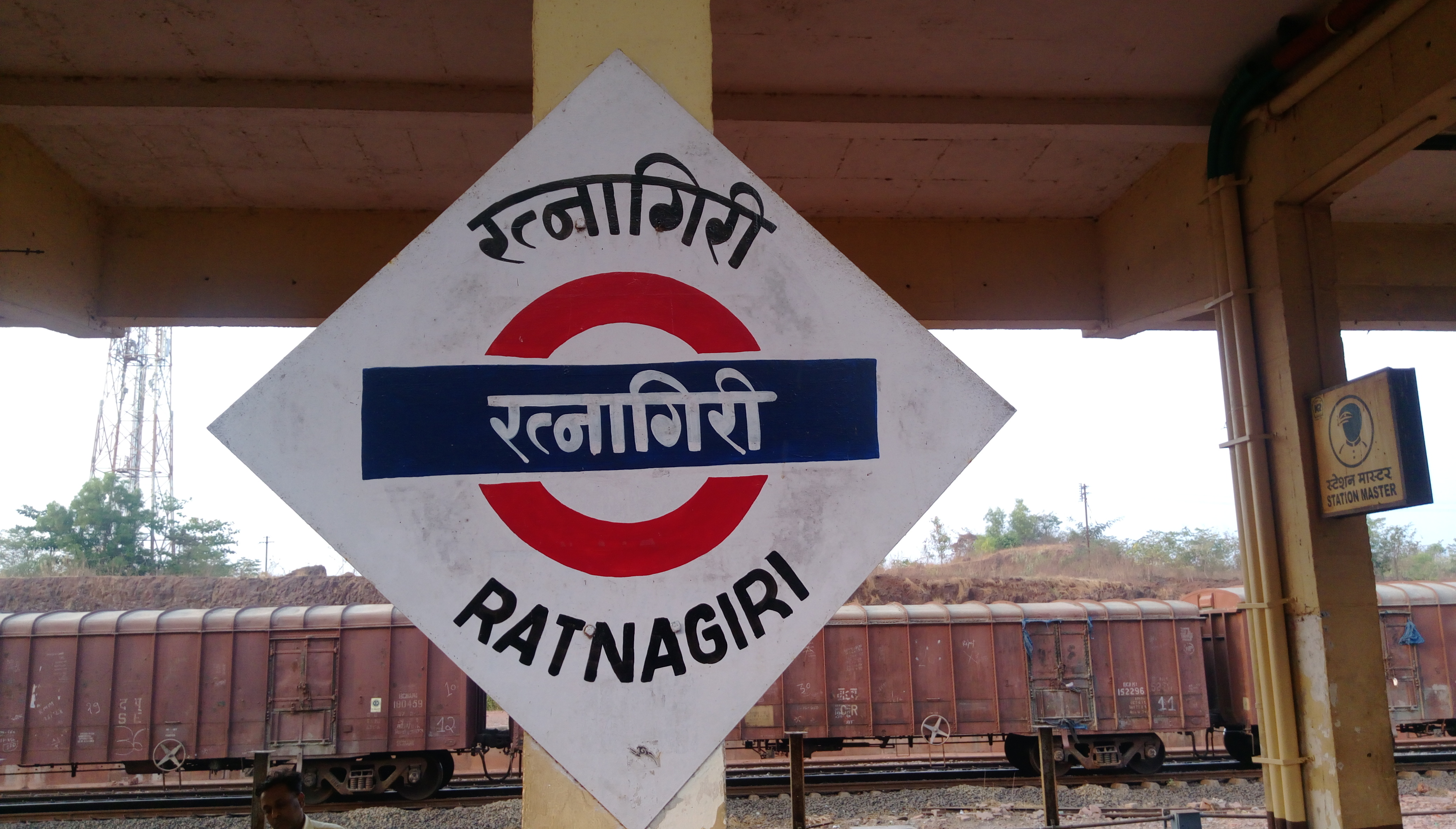
Ratnagiri railway station – Platform board

== See also ==
- Rajdhani Express
- Tejas Express
- Duronto Express
- Humsafar Express
- AC Express (Indian Railways)
- Vande Bharat Express
