= Mangaluru–Tirunelveli Express =

Train in India

Mangaluru - Tirunelveli Express

Overview
- Service type: Express
- Status: Active
- Locale: Karnataka, Kerala and Tamil Nadu
- First service: 19 March 2026; 3 days' time
- Current operator: Southern Railway (SR)

Route
- Termini: Mangaluru Junction (MAJN); Tirunelveli Junction (TEN)
- Stops: 22
- Distance travelled: 751 km (467 mi)
- Average journey time: 18h 45m
- Service frequency: Weekly
- Train number: 16707 / 16708

On-board services
- Classes: General Unreserved, Sleeper Class, AC 3rd Class, AC 2nd Class
- Seating arrangements: Yes
- Sleeping arrangements: Yes
- Catering facilities: Pantry Car
- Observation facilities: Large windows
- Baggage facilities: No
- Other facilities: Below the seats

Technical
- Rolling stock: LHB coach
- Track gauge: 1,676 mm (5 ft 6 in)
- Electrification: 25 kV 50 Hz AC Overhead line
- Operating speed: 130 km/h (81 mph) maximum, 40 km/h (25 mph) average including halts.
- Track owner: Indian Railways

The 16707 / 16708 Mangaluru–Tirunelveli Express is an express train belonging to Southern Railway zone that runs between the city Mangaluru Junction of Karnataka and Tirunelveli Junction of Tamil Nadu in India.

It operates as train number 16707 from Mangaluru Junction to Tirunelveli Junction and as train number 16708 in the reverse direction, serving the states of Karnataka, Kerala and Tamil Nadu.

== Services ==
• 16707/ Mangaluru–Tirunelveli Express has an average speed of 40 km/h and covers 751 km in 18h 45m.

• 16708/ Tirunelveli–Mangaluru Express has an average speed of 49 km/h and covers 751 km in 15h 10m.

== Route and halts ==
The Important Halts of the train are :

- Mangaluru Junction
- Kasaragod
- Kanhangad
- Kannur
- Thalassery
- Vadakara
- Kozhikode
- Tirur
- Shoranur Junction
- Palakkad Junction
- Palakkad Town
- Kollengode
- Pollachi Junction
- Udumalaipettai
- Palani
- Oddanchatram
- Dindigul Junction
- Madurai Junction
- Virudhunagar Junction
- Satur
- Kovilpatti
- Tirunelveli Junction

== Schedule ==
• 16707 - 1:00 PM (Thursday) [Mangaluru Junction]

• 16708 - 3:45 PM (Wednesday) [Tirunelveli Junction]

== Coach composition ==
1. General Unreserved - 4
2. Sleeper Class - 8
3. AC 3rd Class - 3
4. AC 2nd Class - 1

== Traction ==
As the entire route is fully electrified it is hauled by a Royapuram Shed-based WAP-7 electric locomotive from Mangaluru Junction to Tirunelveli Junction and vice versa.

== Rake reversal or rake share ==
The train will reverse 1 time :

1. Palakkad Town

The train will rake sharing with Purulia–Tirunelveli Superfast Express (22605/22606).

== See also ==
Trains from Mangaluru Junction:

1. Mumbai CSMT–Mangaluru Junction Superfast Express
2. Thiruvananthapuram North–Mangaluru Junction Antyodaya Express
3. Nagercoil Junction–Mangaluru Junction Amrit Bharat Express
4. Gomteshwara Express
5. Madgaon–Mangaluru Intercity Express

Trains from Tirunelveli Junction:

1. Chennai Egmore–Tirunelveli Vande Bharat Express
2. Tirunelveli–Bilaspur Express
3. Tirunelveli–Jamnagar Express
4. Tirunelveli–Gandhidham Humsafar Express
5. Nellai Express

== Notes ==
a. Runs one day in a week with both directions.
