= Thiruvananthapuram North–Mangaluru Antyodaya Express (via Kottayam) =

Antyodaya Express train route in India

Thiruvananthapuram North – Mangaluru Antyodaya Superfast Express

Overview
- Service type: Antyodaya Express
- Status: Active
- Locale: Kerala and Karnataka
- First service: 8 March 2026; 48 days ago (Inaugural); 16 March 2026; 40 days ago (Commercial)
- Current operator: Southern Railways (SR)

Route
- Termini: Thiruvananthapuram North (TVCN); Mangaluru Junction (MAJN)
- Stops: 24
- Distance travelled: 626 km (389 mi)
- Average journey time: 13 hrs 35 mins
- Service frequency: Weekly
- Train number: 16313/16314

On-board services
- Class: General Unreserved Coach (GS)
- Seating arrangements: Yes
- Sleeping arrangements: No
- Auto-rack arrangements: Upper
- Catering facilities: No
- Observation facilities: Large windows
- Entertainment facilities: No

Technical
- Rolling stock: LHB-Antyodaya
- Track gauge: Indian gauge
- Electrification: 25 kV 50 Hz AC Overhead line
- Operating speed: 46 km (29 mi)
- Track owner: Indian Railways
- Rake sharing: Thiruvananthapuram North–Mangaluru Antyodaya Express (via Alappuzha)
Route map
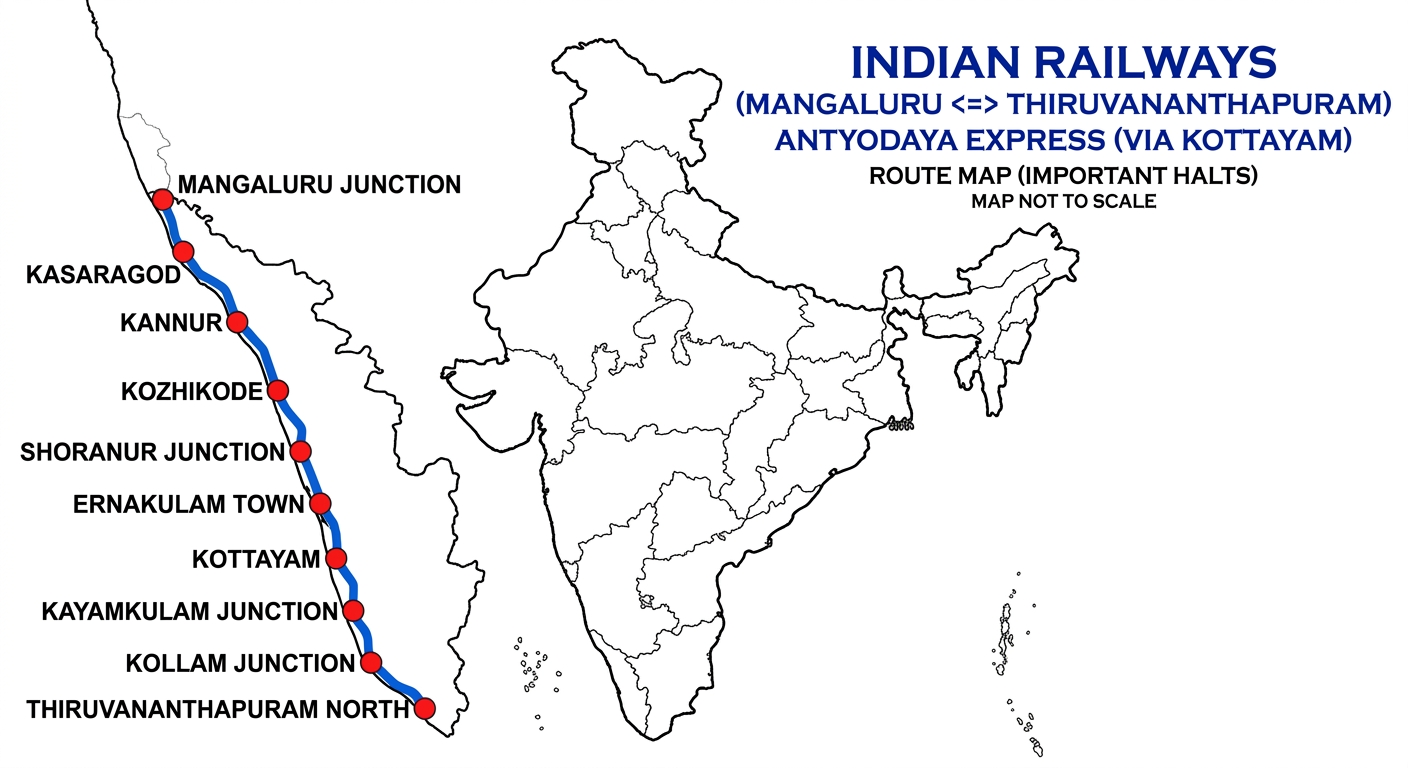

The 16313 / 16314 Thiruvananthapuram North–Mangaluru Antyodaya Express (via Kottayam) is a Non-AC Superfast Express train, which belongs to Southern Railway zone that runs between Thiruvananthapuram North of Kerala and Mangaluru Junction of Karnataka in India.

The express train is inaugurated on 8 March 2026 by Honorable Prime Minister Narendra Modi through video conference.

== Overview ==
The train is operated by Indian Railways, connecting Thiruvananthapuram North and Mangaluru Junction. It is currently operated 16313/16314 on weekly basis.

== Schedule ==
Train Schedule: Thiruvananthapuram North ↔ Mangaluru Amrit Bharat Express
Train No.	Station Code	Departure Station	Departure Time	Departure Day	Arrival Station	Arrival Hours
16313	TVCN	Thiruvananthapuram North	05:15 PM	Mangaluru Junction	06:50 AM	13h 35m
16314	MAJN	Mangaluru Junction	06:00 PM	Thiruvananthapuram North	07:10 AM	13h 10m

== Routes and halts ==
The important halts of the train are :

- Thiruvananthapuram North
- Varkala Sivagiri
- Kollam Junction
- Sasthamkotta
- Karunagappalli
- Kayamkulam Junction
- Mavelikara
- Chengannur
- Tiruvalla
- Changanasseri
- Kottayam
- Ernakulam Town
- Aluva
- Thrissur
- Shoranur Junction
- Tirur
- Kozhikode
- Vadakara
- Thalassery
- Kannur
- Payyanur
- Kanhangad
- Kasaragod
- Mangaluru Junction

== Traction ==
As the entire route is fully electrified it is hauled by a Erode Junction Loco Shed-based WAP-7 electric locomotive from Thiruvananthapuram North to Mangaluru Junction and vice versa.

== Coach composition ==
The trains are completely general coaches trains designed by Indian Railways with features of LED screen display to show information about stations, train speed, etc. Vending machines for water, bio toilets in compartments as well as CCTV cameras, mobile charging points and toilet occupancy indicators.

== Rake share ==
The train will rake sharing with Thiruvananthapuram North–Mangaluru Antyodaya Express (via Alappuzha) (16355/16356).

== See also ==
Trains from Mangaluru Junction :

1. Gomteshwara Express
2. Mangaluru–Coimbatore Intercity Express
3. Mumbai CSMT–Mangaluru Junction Superfast Express
4. Mangaluru–Tirunelveli Express
5. Nagercoil Junction–Mangaluru Junction Amrit Bharat Express

Trains from Thiruvananthapuram North :

1. Thiruvananthapuram North–SMVT Bengaluru Humsafar Express
2. Thiruvananthapuram North–Indore Weekly Express
3. Gorakhpur–Thiruvananthapuram North Raptisagar Express
4. Kerala Sampark Kranti Express
5. Thiruvananthapuram North–Lokmanya Tilak Terminus Garib Rath Express

== Notes ==
a. Runs a day in a week with both directions.
