= Canacona railway station =

Railway station in Goa, India

Canacona Railway Station
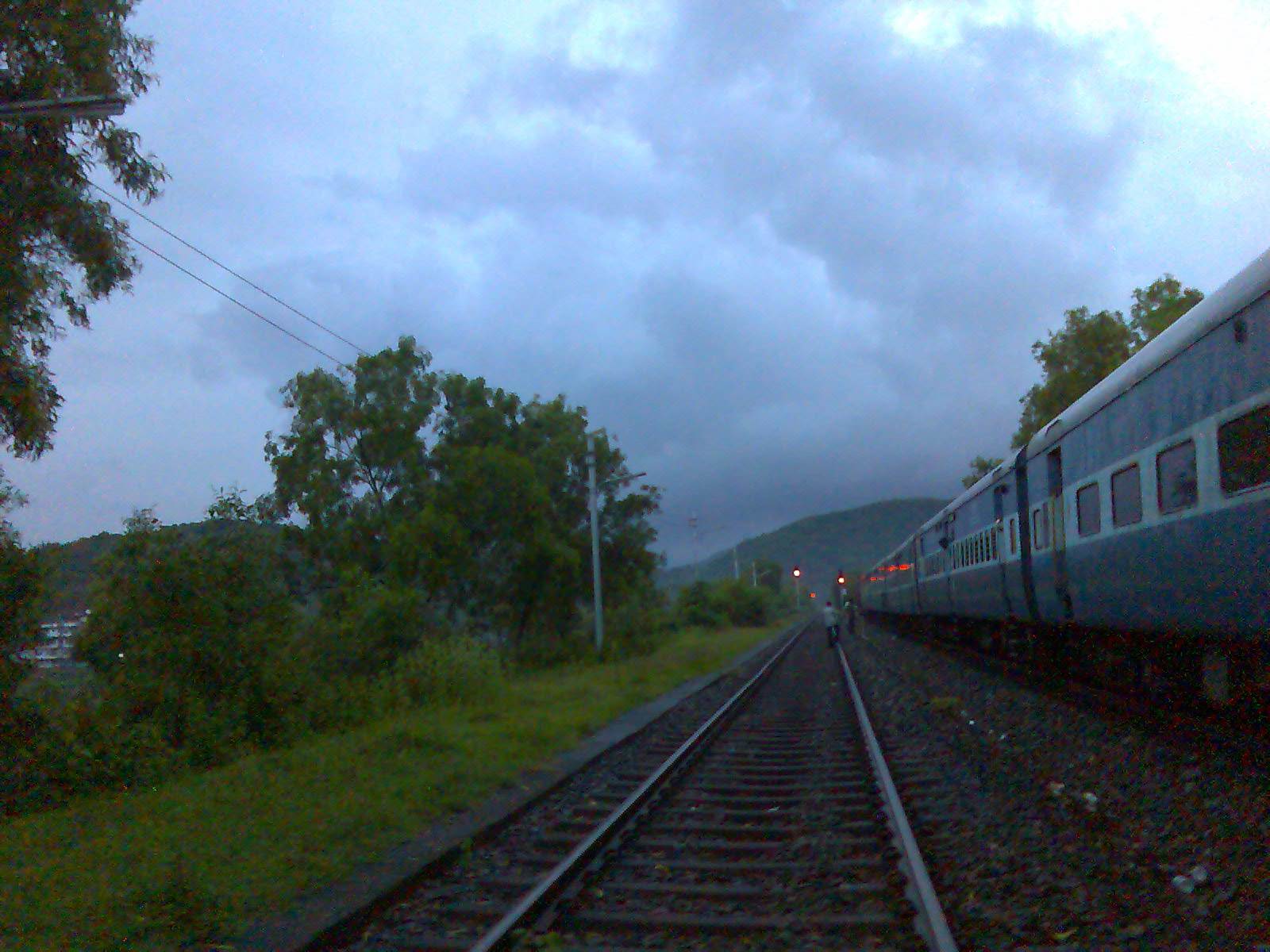
- Canacona railway station during monsoon

General information
- Location: NH 66, Karwar–Madgaon Highway, Chaudi Canacona South Goa, Goa; India
- Coordinates: 15.0069°N 74.0394°E
- Elevation: 6 metres (20 ft)
- System: Indian Railways station
- Owner: Indian Railways
- Operator: Karwar railway division
- Platforms: 2
- Tracks: 4
- Connections: Auto stand

Construction
- Structure type: Standard (on-ground station)
- Parking: No
- Cycle facilities: No

Other information
- Status: Functioning
- Station code: CNO
- Fare zone: Konkan Railway

Services
Preceding station	Indian Railways	Following station
Balli towards Roha	Konkan Railway Konkan Railway	Loliem towards Thokur
Route map
Location
- Location within Goa

Canacona Railway Station (Station code: CNO) is a small railway station in South Goa district, Goa. It serves Canacona, a sub-district ('taluka') in the extreme southernmost end of Goa. The station consists of two platforms of which one is high level platform and other is rail level platform. The high level platform is well sheltered. It has many facilities including drinking water cooler, gents and ladies washrooms and food stall.

== Major trains ==
- Madgaon–Mangaluru Central DEMU
- Karwar–Pernem DEMU
- Mangaluru Central–Madgaon Passenger
- Madgaon–Mangaluru Intercity Express
