= Tambaram–Sengottai Antyodaya Express =

Superfast express train of the Indian Railways

Tambaram - Sengottai Antyodaya Express
Overview
- Service type: Antyodaya Express
- Status: Inactive (Defunct)
- First service: 05/03/2018
- Last service: 14/03/2018
- Current operator: Southern Railway zone

Route
- Termini: Tambaram (TBM); Sengottai (SCT)
- Stops: 17
- Distance travelled: 730.1 km (453.7 mi)
- Average journey time: 16 hrs (Approx.)
- Service frequency: Bi-weekly
- Train number: 16189/16190

On-board services
- Class: Second Class Sitting : 16, General Second Class: 2
- Seating arrangements: Yes
- Sleeping arrangements: No
- Catering facilities: No
- Observation facilities: Large windows
- Entertainment facilities: No

Technical
- Rolling stock: 1
- Track gauge: 1,676 mm (5 ft 6 in)

Tambaram - Sengottai Antyodaya Express was a superfast express train of the Indian Railways connecting Tambaram in Chengalpet district with Sengottai in Tenkasi district of Tamil Nadu. It was planned to be operated daily with 16189/16190 train numbers, later decision was reverted.

== Coach composition ==
The train has 16 unreserved coaches (UR) and 2 EOG. These coaches feature a LED screen display to show information about stations, train speed etc. Vending machines for tea, coffee and milk, Bio toilets in compartments as well as CCTV cameras as well as facility for potable drinking water and mobile charging points and toilet occupancy indicators.

== Service ==
The service commences in early morning almost simultaneously at both, Tambaram and Sengottai and reach their final destination late night via Villupuram Junction, Mayiladuthurai Junction, Kumbakonam, Thanjavur Junction, Tiruchchirappalli Junction, Karaikudi Junction, Manamadurai Junction and Virudhunagar Junction.

This train was permanently cancelled after 15 days of trial run (with numbers of 06023/24 and ran via vriddhachalam junction due to ongoing interlock works at thanjavur junction) and the single rake which was allocated for this route was re-allocated for new antyodya train service between Kochuveli Mangalore Junction Antyodya Express which was inaugurated on 09/06/2018. Due to raise of demand, now railways is planning to operate a new triweekly express between Tambaram to Sengottai via Ambasamudram, Aruppukottai, Pattukottai in the name of Thamirabarani Express as a compensation for this cancelled Antyodya Express.

== See also ==
- Antyodaya Express
- Tambaram railway station
- Sengottai railway station
