= Lokmanya Tilak Terminus–Tatanagar Antyodaya Express =

Lokmanya Tilak Terminus - Tatanagar Antyodaya Express
Overview
- Service type: Antyodaya Express
- First service: 18 March 2017; 9 years ago
- Last service: 17 March 2020; 6 years ago
- Current operator: South Eastern Railways

Route
- Termini: Lokmanya Tilak Terminus (LTT); Tatanagar Junction (TATA)
- Stops: 22
- Distance travelled: 1,697 km (1,054 mi)
- Average journey time: 25h 0m
- Service frequency: Twice aweek (Note: Runs twice in a week for every direction.)
- Train number: 22885 / 22886

On-board services
- Class: Unreserved
- Seating arrangements: Yes
- Sleeping arrangements: Yes
- Catering facilities: No
- Observation facilities: Large windows
- Entertainment facilities: No

Technical
- Rolling stock: LHB-Antyodaya
- Track gauge: 1,676 mm (5 ft 6 in)
- Operating speed: 68 km/h (42 mph)
Route map
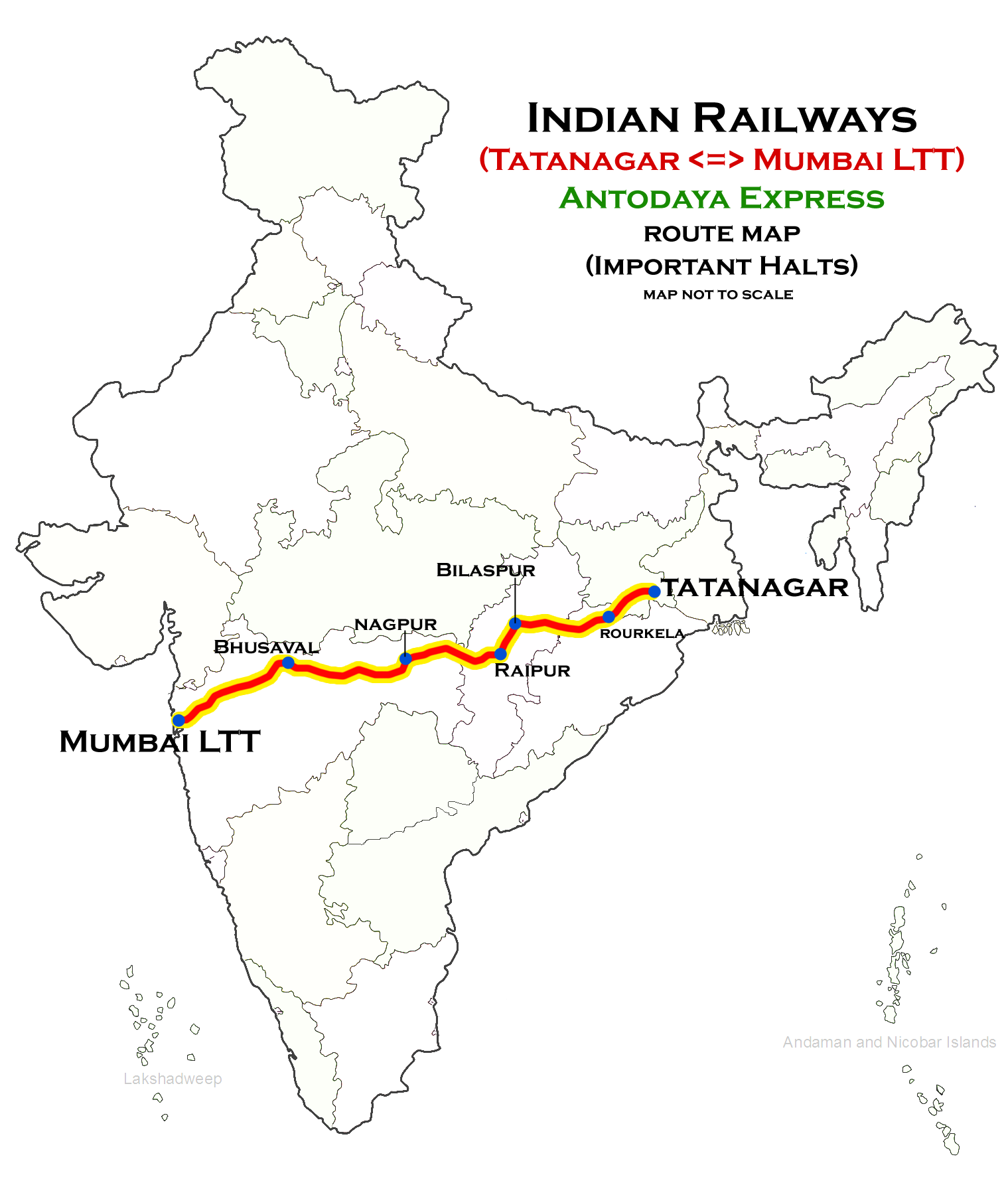

Lokmanya Tilak Terminus - Tatanagar Antyodaya Express was a superfast express train of the Indian Railways connecting Lokmanya Tilak Terminus in Maharashtra and Tatanagar Junction in Jharkhand. It was operated with 22885/22886 train numbers on a weekly basis.

== Coach composition ==
The trains was completely general coaches trains designed by Indian Railways with features of LED screen display to show information about stations, train speed etc, vending machines for tea, coffee and milk, bio toilets in compartments as well as CCTV cameras as well as facility for potable drinking water and mobile charging points and toilet occupancy indicators.

== Service ==
It averaged 68 km/h as 22885 Antyodaya Express and started on Tuesday and Saturday and covering 1711 km in 25 hrs 1697 km/h as 22886 Antyodaya Express started on Sunday and Thursday covering 1711 km in 25 hrs 50 mins.

== Route and halts ==
- Lokmanya Tilak Terminus
- Kasara
- Igatpuri
- Chalisgaon Junction
- Bhusaval Junction
- Akola junction
- Nagpur Junction
- Gondia Junction
- Durg Junction
- Raipur Junction
- Bilaspur Junction
- Raigarh
- Jharsuguda Junction
- Rourkela Junction
- Chakradharpur
- Tatanagar Junction

== Locomotive ==
Both trains are hauled by a Tatanagar based WAP 7 electric locomotives on its entire journey.

== See also ==
- Antyodaya Express
- Lokmanya Tilak Terminus
- Tatanagar Junction railway station
- Howrah - Ernakulam Antyodaya Express
