= 2016 Budget =

The 2016 budget can refer to:

- 2016 United States federal budget
- 2016 United Kingdom budget
- 2016 Union budget of India
