= Darbhanga–Varanasi City Antyodaya Express =

Indian express train route

Darbhanga Junction – Varanasi City Antyodaya Express

Overview
- Service type: Antyodaya Express
- First service: 6 March 2019; 6 years ago
- Current operator: East Central Railway

Route
- Termini: Darbhanga Junction (DBG); Varanasi City (BCY)
- Stops: 7
- Distance travelled: 405 km (252 mi)
- Average journey time: 10 hours 30 mins
- Service frequency: Weekly (Note: Run once in a week for every direction.)
- Train number: 15551/15552

On-board services
- Class: Unreserved
- Seating arrangements: Yes
- Sleeping arrangements: No
- Catering facilities: No
- Entertainment facilities: No
- Baggage facilities: Yes

Technical
- Rolling stock: 2
- Track gauge: 1,676 mm (5 ft 6 in)
- Operating speed: 38 km/h (24 mph)

The 15551/15552 Darbhanga–Varanasi City Antyodaya Express is an Express train belonging to East Central Railway zone that runs between Darbhanga Junction and Varanasi City.

It is being operated with 15551/15552 train numbers on a weekly basis.

== Coach composition ==
The trains is completely general coaches trains designed by Indian Railways with features of LED screen display to show information about stations, train speed etc. Vending machines for water. Bio toilets in compartments as well as CCTV cameras and mobile charging points and toilet occupancy indicators.

== Service ==
- 15551/Darbhanga–Varanasi City Antyodaya Express has an average speed of 41 km/h and covers 405 km in 9 hrs 50 mins.
- 15552/Varanasi City–Darbhanga Antyodaya Express has an average speed of 36 km/h and covers 405 km in 11 hrs 20 mins.

== Route and halts ==
The important halts of the train are:

- Darbhanga Junction
- Samastipur Junction
- Muzaffarpur Junction
- Hajipur Junction
- Sonpur Junction
- Chhapra Junction
- Ballia
- Ghazipur City
- Varanasi City

== Schedule ==
Train number	Station code	Departure station	Departure time	Departure day	Arrival station	Arrival time	Arrival day
15551	DBG	Darbhanga Junction	20:55 PM	Wed	Varanasi City	06:45 AM	Thu
15552	BCY	Varanasi City	09:15 AM	Thu	Darbhanga Junction	20:35 PM	Thu

== Rake sharing ==
The train shares its rake with 22551/22552 Darbhanga–Jalandhar City Antyodaya Express.

== Direction reversal ==
Train reverses its direction at:

- Samastipur Junction

== See also ==
- Antyodaya Express
