= 2016 Railway budget of India =

Indian railway budget of 2016

- Emblem of India
- Submitted by: Suresh Prabhu, Minister of Railways
- Presented: 25 February 2016
- Country: India
- Parliament: Parliament of India
- Party: Bharatiya Janata Party
- Website: www.indiabudget.nic.in

The 2016 Railway Budget of India refers to the Railway Budget of the Indian Railways in the fiscal year 2016–17. The budget was presented by the Railway Minister Suresh Prabhu in the Parliament of India on 25 February 2016. It was the final Railway Budget of India as after this budget, the Railway Budget got merged with the Union budget of India.

== Summary ==
There were no fare hikes. It was announced that the freight tariffs would be changed to make them more competitive to the cost of transport by road. The capital outlay for 2016-17 was set at ₹1.21 lakh crore (US$13 billion), a 20% increase from last year. The revenue from traffic was projected at ₹1.85 lakh crore (US$19 billion).

=== Cleanliness ===
It was announced that 17,000 bio-vacuum toilets would be installed on various trains. These toilets use a bacterium developed by the DRDO in the compost tank. Additional toilets would be built in 475 stations. A "Clean My Coach" initiative was announced which will allow passengers to request cleaning service by SMS.

=== Safety ===
A target to eliminate all unstaffed railway crossings by 2020 was announced. There are about 11,000 unstaffed crossings in India. The 2015 budget had allocated ₹6,581 crore (US$683 million) to eliminate 3,500 of these crossing. But by February 2016, work had been completed on only 1,000 of them. CCTVs will be installed in major stations. It was also announced that travel insurance will be offered to passengers.

=== Convenience and comfort ===
New SMART (Specially Modified Aesthetic Refreshing Travel) coaches will be introduced, which will be roomier and have automatic doors, entertainment and vending machines. FM radio stations will be invited to provide entertainment at selected stations. The railway magazine, Rail Bandhu, will be now published in all regional languages and would be available for purchase to reserved passengers.

=== Facilities for senior citizens, women and disabled individuals ===
The budget introduced some new facilities for senior citizens, women and disabled individuals. The number of lower berths reserved for senior citizens was increased by 50% to about 120 per train. Under the reserved category, 33% was earmarked for women travelers. In all coaches, the middle bays were reserved for women. A 24-hours helpline for women was announced. Women traveling with infants will provided with baby foods, milk, hot water and diaper-changing boards on trains and stations under the "Janani Seva" initiative.

It was also announced that disabled individuals will be able to register once online to avail concession. New Braille-enabled coaches will be introduced. Wheelchairs will be allowed to be booked online. Under the Accessible India Campaign, all stations currently under redevelopment will be made disabled-friendly.

=== New trains and projects ===
Antyodaya Express will be a fully unreserved Superfast Express class of trains which will run on dense routes. A few unreserved additional coaches called "Deen Dayalu" coaches will be added to long distance trains. These coaches will have potable water and mobile charging ports. The Mahamana Express between Delhi and Varanasi was announced with upgraded coaches.

Humsafar Express, an AC 3-tier service with optional meal service, targeted at the middle class was announced. Tejas will be a semi-high speed train with a speed of 130 km/h. It will provide onboard WiFi, entertainment and local cuisine. Uday Express or Utkrisht Double Decker Air Conditioned Yatri Express will be double-decker trains with 40% additional passenger capacity. They will run overnight on busy routes. Three new freight corridors were announced: Delhi to Chennai, Kharagpur to Mumbai, and Kharagpur to Vijaywada.

=== Other ===
A Special Unit for Transportation Research and Analytics (SUTRA) was announced to datamine the 1TB of data collected annually by the railways. It was reported that an audit of operations in the Ghaziabad to Mughalsarai section has been started. The heavy traffic section used to affect the entire network. Following the audit, some improvement in punctuality were observed.

== Responses ==
Prime Minister Narendra Modi called the budget passenger-centric and said that it caters to all sections of the society. Transport Minister Nitin Gadkari called the budget reformative and claimed that it will change the basic infrastructure of the railways.

The Aam Aadmi Party in a statement called the budget oblivious to the needs of the common man. It claimed that the budget panders to the corporations. It also pointed out that the benefit of falling oil prices were not passed on to the passengers. INC leader Shashi Tharoor said that the budget seemed like corporate presentation and that it had no concrete proposals for changes in the services.

Odisha Chief Minister Naveen Patnaik welcomed the increased allocation of funds towards his state, a 30% increase from 2015. He also praised the extension of the Kharagpur to Vijayawada freight corridor. Gujarat Chief Minister Anandiben Patel praised the railway budget for the facilities provided to senior citizens and women.

The stock market index SENSEX fell 113 points after the announcement. The stock values of companies in the railway sector also fell.

== See also ==
- 2016 Union budget of India
