= Harwada railway station =

Railway station in Karnataka, India

Harwada

General information
- Location: Kochi–Panvel Road; India
- Coordinates: 14.7404°N 74.2594°E
- Owner: Indian Railways
- Operator: Konkan Railway
- Line: Konkan Railway
- Platforms: 1

Construction
- Structure type: Standard (on ground station)

Other information
- Status: Functioning
- Station code: HAA
- Zone(s): Konkan Railway
- Division(s): Karwar
- Fare zone: Indian Railways

History
- Opened: 1997; 29 years ago

Services
Preceding station	Indian Railways	Following station
Karwar towards Roha	Konkan Railway Konkan Railway	Ankola towards Thokur
Route map
Location
- Location within Karnataka

Harwada railway station is one of the railway stations near Karwar in coastal Karnataka. One of the smaller stations on the Konkan Railway route, four trains halt here; there are no originating or terminating trains at this station.

== Background ==
The station has only one platform, and a single diesel 5 ft 6 in (1,676 mm) broad gaugetrack. which has been electrified now.

== Location ==
It is located seven meters above mean sea level.

The nearest airport, Goa's Dabolim Airport/GOI, is 89 kilometres away. The National Highway 66 NH66 (previously numbered as NH 17) connecting city of Panvel to Kochi passes beside Harawada railroad station.
