= Antyodaya Express =

Series of Express train in India

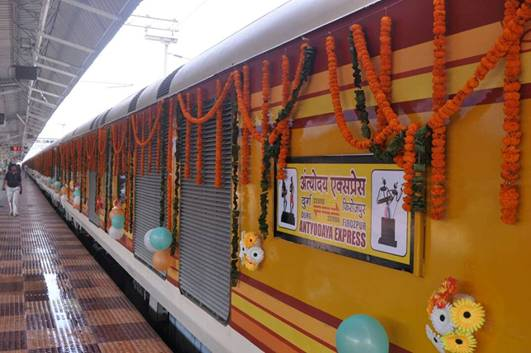
- Antyodaya Express

Overview
- Service type: Un-reserved travel
- Status: Active
- Predecessor: Jan Sadharan Express
- First service: 4 March 2017; 9 years ago
- Successor: Amrit Bharat Express
- Current operator: Indian Railways
- Website: http://indianrail.gov.in

On-board services
- Class: Unreserved General
- Seating arrangements: Yes
- Sleeping arrangements: No
- Catering facilities: On board Vendors sale
- Entertainment facilities: Electric outlets
- Baggage facilities: Underseat & Overhead racks
- Other facilities: Fire Extinguishers; Purified water dispensers

Technical
- Rolling stock: LHB rakes
- Track gauge: 5 ft 6 in (1,676 mm) broad gauge
- Track owner: Indian Railways

Antyodaya Express are a series of Economic Unreserved Superfast Express trains operated by Indian Railways. The trains were proposed to be overnight unreserved trains in the 2016 Railway budget of India. Antyodaya refers to the Rise of dusk in Sanskrit ( Anthi - Dusk, udhaya - Rise) which symbolises its Overnight Services. The coaches are designed by Indian Railways with features such as bio-toilets and dedicated power sockets. And the color of this coach was closest to the color of ICF Rajdhani Coaches in 1999-2019

== History ==
The first service was inaugurated on 27 February 2017, between Ernakulam Junction and Howrah with a paintless and a stainless steel LHB coach and powered by Golden Rock-based WDP-3A on first run.

== Facilities ==
The trains include dedicated charging ports, bio-toilets, vinyl sheets on the exteriors for aesthetics, safety measures such as smoke alarm and CCTV, water vending machines, coat hangers, and Braille indicators.

== Services ==
the Antyodaya Express earlier was run with WDM-3A during first run and nowadays was WAP-5 , WAP-4 and WAP-7

=== Active ===
from 2016 to present time only 13 train services active below

| Sr. No. | Train No | Route | Service frequency | Inaugural run on |
|---|---|---|---|---|
| 1 | 22877/22878 | Howrah–Ernakulam | Weekly | 4 March 2017 |
| 2 | 22921/22922 | Bandra–Gorakhpur | Weekly | 13 August 2017 |
| 3 | 22563/22564 | Jaynagar–Udhna | Weekly | 13 October 2017 |
| 4 | 22551/22552 | Darbhanga–Jalandhar City | Weekly | 19 May 2018 |
| 5 | 22841/22842 | Santragachi–Tambaram (Chennai) | Weekly | 4 June 2018 |
| 6 | 20691/20692 | Tambaram (Chennai)–Nagercoil | Daily | 9 June 2018 |
| 7 | 16355/16356 | Thiruvananthapuram North–Mangaluru (Via Alappuzha) | Bi weekly | 8 June 2018 |
| 8 | 15551/15552 | Darbhanga–Varanasi City | Weekly | 6 March 2019 |
| 9 | 12597/12598 | Gorakhpur–Mumbai CSMT | Weekly | 23 April 2019 |
| 10 | 22583/22584 | Chhapra–Lokmanya Tilak Terminus (Mumbai) | Weekly | 26 April 2019 |
| 11 | 15267/15268 | Raxaul–Lokmanya Tilak Terminus (Mumbai) | Weekly | 31 August 2019 |
| 12 | 15559/15560 | Darbhanga–Ahmedabad | Weekly | 22 November 2019 |
| 13 | 16313/16314 | Thiruvananthapuram North–Mangaluru (via Kottayam) | Weekly | 16 March 2026 |

=== Defunct ===
only 5 Antyodaya Express below is discontinued service

| Sr. No. | Train No | Route | Service frequency | Inaugural run on |
|---|---|---|---|---|
| 1 | 16189/16190 | Tambaram–Sengottai | Bi-Weekly | 5 March 2018 |
| 2 | 22895/22896 | Durg–Firozpur Cantonment | Weekly | 1 May 2018 |
| 3 | 14719/14720 | Bikaner–Bilaspur | Weekly | 13 July 2018 |
| 4 | 22885/22886 | Lokmanya Tilak Terminus (Mumbai)–Tatanagar | Biweekly | 18 March 2017 |
| 5 | 15547/15548 | Jaynagar–Lokmanya Tilak Terminus (Mumbai) | Weekly | 24 September 2018 |

== See also ==
- Vande Bharat Express
- Amrit Bharat Express
- AC Superfast Express
- Jaipur–Udaipur City Antyodaya Express
- Mumbai–Ahmedabad high-speed rail corridor
- Humsafar Express
- Tejas Express
- Uday Express
- Double Decker Express
- Duronto Express
- Rajdhani Express
- Shatabdi Express
- Jan Shatabdi Express
- Jan Sadharan Express
- Garib Rath Express
- Mahamana Express
- Gatimaan Express
- Yuva Express
