= Jaipur–Udaipur City Antyodaya Express =

Antyodaya Express train in India

Jaipur Junction – Udaipur City Antyodaya Express

Overview
- Service type: Antyodaya Express
- Current operator: North Western Railway

Route
- Termini: Jaipur Junction (JP); Udaipur City (UDZ)
- Stops: 10
- Distance travelled: 428.5 km (266.3 mi)
- Average journey time: 7h 15m
- Service frequency: Daily (Note: Run all 7 days in a week for every direction.)
- Train number: 20971/20972

On-board services
- Class: Unreserved
- Seating arrangements: Yes
- Sleeping arrangements: No
- Catering facilities: No
- Entertainment facilities: No
- Baggage facilities: Yes

Technical
- Rolling stock: 1
- Track gauge: 1,676 mm (5 ft 6 in)
- Operating speed: 59 km/h (37 mph)

Jaipur–Udaipur City Antyodaya Express is an Antyodaya class of superfast express train belonging to Jaipur division, North Western Railway that it planned to be run between Jaipur Junction and Udaipur City. It is planned to be operated with 20971/20972 train numbers on Daily basis.

== Service ==
The Jaipur to Udaipur city train (20971) is proposed to leaves Jaipur junction every day at 6:15 p.m. and reaches Udaipur at 1:30 p.m. The reverse train (20971) leaves Udaipur every day at 3:05 p.m. and reaches Jaipur junction at 10:25 p.m the next day.

== Route and halts ==
- Bhilwara
- Ajmer Junction

== Coach composition ==
The trains is completely LHB general coaches (unreserved) designed by Indian Railways with features of LED screen display to show information about stations, train speed etc. Vending machines for water. Bio toilets in compartments as well as CCTV cameras and mobile charging points and toilet occupancy indicators. The rake of this train is not sharing with any other services and the maintenance is done at Jaipur junction.

Loco	1	2	3	4	5	6	7	8	9	10	11	12	13	14	15	16	17	18
	EOG	UR	UR	UR	UR	UR	UR	UR	UR	UR	UR	UR	UR	UR	UR	UR	UR	EOG

== See also ==
- Antyodaya Express
