= Santragachi–Tambaram Antyodaya Express =

Indian express train

Santragachi Junction - Tambaram Antyodaya Express

Overview
- Service type: Antyodaya Express
- First service: 4 June 2018; 7 years ago
- Current operator: South Eastern Railways

Route
- Termini: Santragachi Junction (SRC); Tambaram (TBM)
- Stops: 27
- Distance travelled: 1,683 km (1,046 mi)
- Average journey time: 28h 00m
- Service frequency: Weekly (Note: Run once in a week for every direction.)
- Train number: 22841 / 22842

On-board services
- Class: Unreserved
- Seating arrangements: Yes
- Sleeping arrangements: No
- Catering facilities: No
- Entertainment facilities: No
- Baggage facilities: Yes

Technical
- Rolling stock: LHB-Antyodaya
- Track gauge: 1,676 mm (5 ft 6 in)
- Operating speed: 62 km/h (39 mph)

The 22841 / 22842 Santragachi - Tambaram Antyodaya SF Express (formerly Santragachi–Chennai Central Antyodaya Express) is a Unreserved Superfast Express train belonging to South Eastern Railway zone that runs between Santragachi Junction and Tambaram.

== Service ==
The 22841/Santragachi - Tambaram Antyodaya Express has an average speed of 60 km/h and covers 1683 km in 28 hrs 00 mins.

The 22842/Tambaram - Santragachi Antyodaya Express has an average speed of 63 km/h and covers 1683 km in 27 hrs 10 mins.

== Route and halts ==
The important halts of the train are:

- Santragachi Junction
- Kharagpur Junction
- Balasore
- Bhadrak
- Jajpur Keonjhar Road
- Cuttack Junction
- Bhubaneswar
- Khurda Road Junction
- Balugaon
- Chatrapur
- Brahmapur
- Sompeta
- Palasa
- Srikakulam Road
- Vizianagaram Junction
- Visakhapatnam Junction
- Duvvada
- Anakapalle
- Samalkot Junction
- Rajahmundry
- Eluru
- Vijayawada Junction
- Chirala
- Ongole
- Nellore
- Gudur Junction
- Sullurupeta
- Chennai Egmore
- Tambaram

== Direction reversal ==
Train reverses its direction one time:

- Visakhapatnam Junction

== Traction ==
Both trains are hauled by a Santragachi Loco Shed based WAP 4 between Santragachi Junction and Visakhapatnam Junction. After, Visakhapatnam Junction, both trains are hauled by a Lallaguda Loco Shed or Vijayawada Loco Shed based WAP 4.

== See also ==
- Antyodaya Express
- Santragachi–Chennai Central AC Express
