= 2016 Union budget of India =

Government budget

- Emblem of India
- Submitted by: Arun Jaitley, Finance Minister
- Presented: 29 February 2016
- Country: India
- Parliament: Indian Parliament
- Party: Bhartiya Janta Party
- Website: www.indiabudget.gov.in

The 2016 Union budget of India was the annual financial statement of India for the fiscal year 2016–2017. It was presented before the parliament on 29 February 2016 by the Finance Minister of India, Arun Jaitley. The printing of the budget documents began with a traditional Halwa ceremony on 19 February 2016. For budget 2016-17, the government invited suggestions from citizens through Twitter for the first time, even conducting a series of polls to gauge public priorities and expectations from the budget.

== Key points ==
₹10.6 billion (US$110 million) revenue loss through direct tax proposals, and ₹206.7 billion (US$2.1 billion) revenue gain through indirect tax proposals. Revenue gain of ₹196 billion (US$2.0 billion) in Union Budget 2016 proposals. Surcharge was increased from 12% to 15% on tax on all incomes above ₹1 crore (US$100,000) and those earning dividend of over ₹10 lakh (US$10,000) per annum will now have to pay tax on it. Monetary limit for deciding an appeal by a single member Bench of ITAT enhanced from ₹15 lakh (US$16,000) to ₹50 lakh (US$52,000). STT (Securities Transaction Tax) was retained at 0.1% for delivery based equities.

== Allocations ==
- ₹9 billion (US$93 million) for a buffer stock of pulses.
- ₹773.83 billion (US$8.0 billion) to the home ministry of which ₹674.08 billion (US$7.0 billion) is under non-plan and ₹99.75 billion (US$1.0 billion) under plan heads.
- ₹360 billion (US$3.7 billion) for agriculture and farmer welfare
- ₹880 billion (US$9.1 billion) towards rural development
- ₹2.21 lakh crore (US$23 billion) for roads, railways and other facilities
- ₹210 billion (US$2.2 billion) was allocated to the Urban Development Ministry, while Housing and Poverty Alleviation got ₹54 billion (US$560 million).

Complete list of allocations and receipts can be found on the official site.

== Reactions ==
Opposition member and former Prime Minister of India, Dr. Manmohan Singh termed it a "mixed bag Budget" with no big idea.

== See also ==
- Union budget of India
- 2016 Railway Budget of India
