= Tirunelveli–Bilaspur Express =

Passenger train in India

Tirunelveli–Bilaspur Superfast Express
Overview
- Service type: Express
- First service: 4 January 2010; 16 years ago
- Current operator: Southern Railways

Route
- Termini: Tirunelveli Junction (TEN); Bilaspur Junction (BSP)
- Stops: 29
- Distance travelled: 2,492 km (1,548 mi)
- Average journey time: 45 hours 10 mins
- Service frequency: Weekly
- Train number: 22619 / 22620

On-board services
- Classes: AC 2 tier, AC 3 tier, Sleeper class, General Unreserved
- Seating arrangements: Yes
- Sleeping arrangements: Yes
- Catering facilities: On-board catering, E-catering
- Observation facilities: Large windows
- Other facilities: Below the seats

Technical
- Rolling stock: LHB coach
- Track gauge: 1,676 mm (5 ft 6 in)
- Operating speed: 57 km/h (35 mph) average including halts
- Rake maintenance: Tirunelveli Junction
Route map
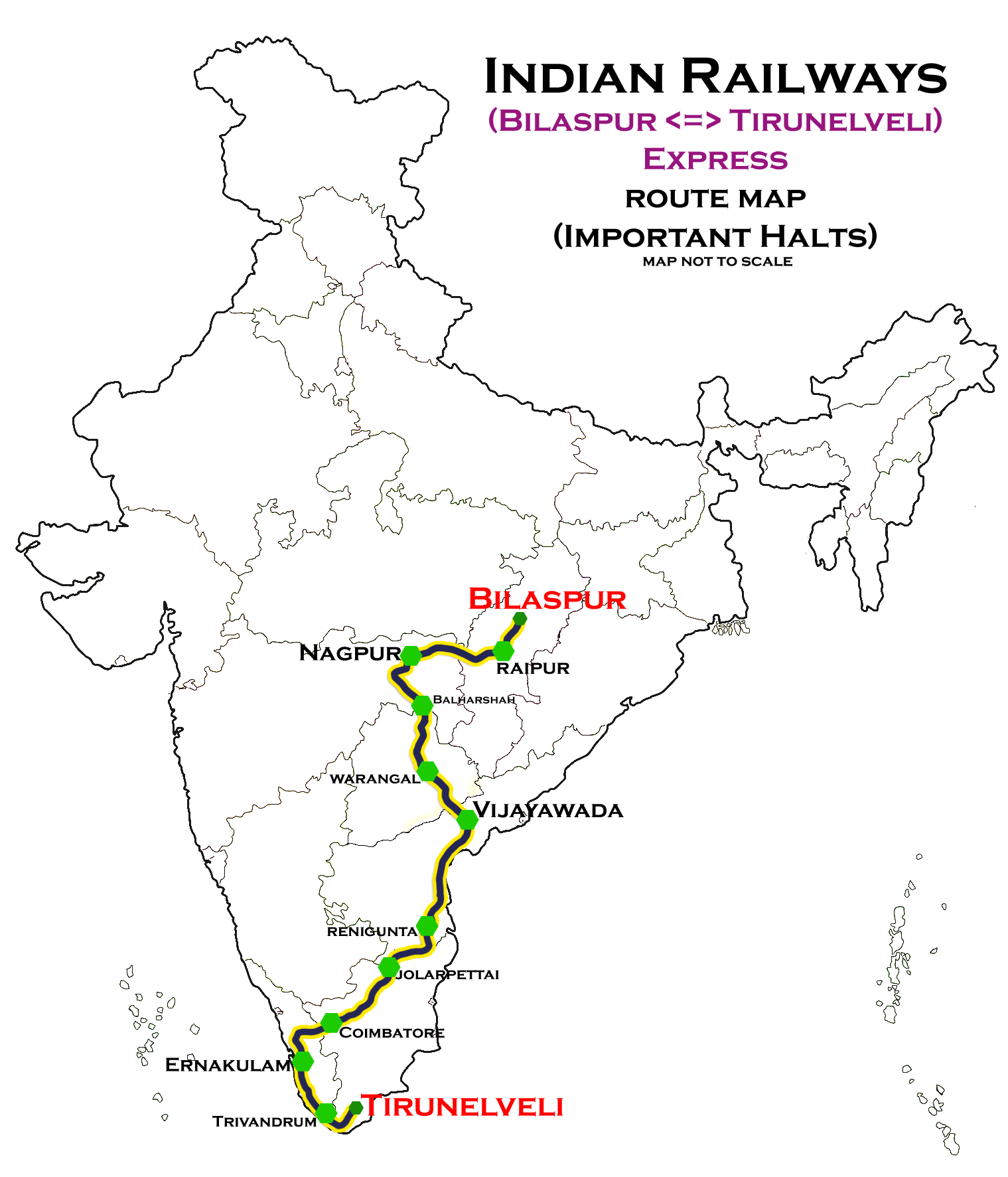

The 22619 / 22620 Tirunelveli–Bilaspur Superfast Express is an express train belonging to Indian Railways Southern Railway zone that runs between Tirunelveli Junction and Bilaspur Junction in India.

It operates as train number 22620 from Tirunelveli Junction to Bilaspur Junction and as train number 22619 in the reverse direction, serving the states of Kerala, Tamil Nadu, Andhra Pradesh, Telangana, Maharashtra and Chhattisgarh.

== Coaches ==
The 22620 / 19 Tirunelveli–Bilaspur Express has one AC 2-tier, two AC 3-tier, 12 sleeper class, four general unreserved and two SLR (seating with luggage rake) coaches and two high capacity parcel van coaches. It does not carry a pantry car.

LHB rake is allotted for the service from 3 June 2018.

As is customary with most train services in India, coach composition may be amended at the discretion of Indian Railways depending on demand.

== Service ==
The 22620 Tirunelveli Junction–Bilaspur Junction Express covers the distance of 2,151 km (1,337 mi) in 37 hours 10 mins (58 km/h) and in 37 hours 25 mins as the 22619 Bilaspur Junction–Tirunelveli Junction (57 km/h).

As the average speed of the train is higher than 55 km/h (34 mph), as per railway rules, its fare includes a Superfast surcharge.

== Routing ==
The train runs from Tirunelveli Junction via Thiruvananthapuram, Kollam, Ernakulam, Palakkad Junction, Coimbatore Junction, Erode, Katpadi Junction, Renigunta, Ongole,Vijayawada, Warangal, Balharshah, Nagpur Junction, Bhandara Road, Gondia, Rajnandgaon, Durg, Raipur, Bhatapara to Bilaspur Junction.

== Traction ==
As the route is fully electrified, a Royapuram Loco Shed / Erode Loco Shed-based WAP-7 (HOG)-equipped locomotive powers the train for its entire journey.

== See also ==
- Tirunelveli Junction
- Bilaspur Junction
