= Howrah–Ernakulam Antyodaya Express =

Express Unreserved train service in India

Howrah Junction – Ernakulam Junction Antyodaya Superfast Express

Overview
- Service type: Antyodaya Express
- Status: Running
- First service: 27 February 2017; 9 years ago
- Current operator: South Eastern Railways
- Ridership: Weekly

Route
- Termini: Howrah (HWH); Ernakulam (ERS)
- Stops: 23
- Distance travelled: 1,970 km (1,220 mi)
- Average journey time: 37h
- Service frequency: Weekly (Note: Runs once in a week for every direction.)
- Train number: 22877 / 22878

On-board services
- Class: Unreserved
- Seating arrangements: Yes
- Sleeping arrangements: No
- Auto-rack arrangements: Up
- Catering facilities: No
- Observation facilities: Large windows
- Entertainment facilities: No

Technical
- Rolling stock: LHB-Antyodaya
- Track gauge: 1,676 mm (5 ft 6 in)
- Electrification: Fully Electrified
- Operating speed: 63 km/h (39 mph)
Route map
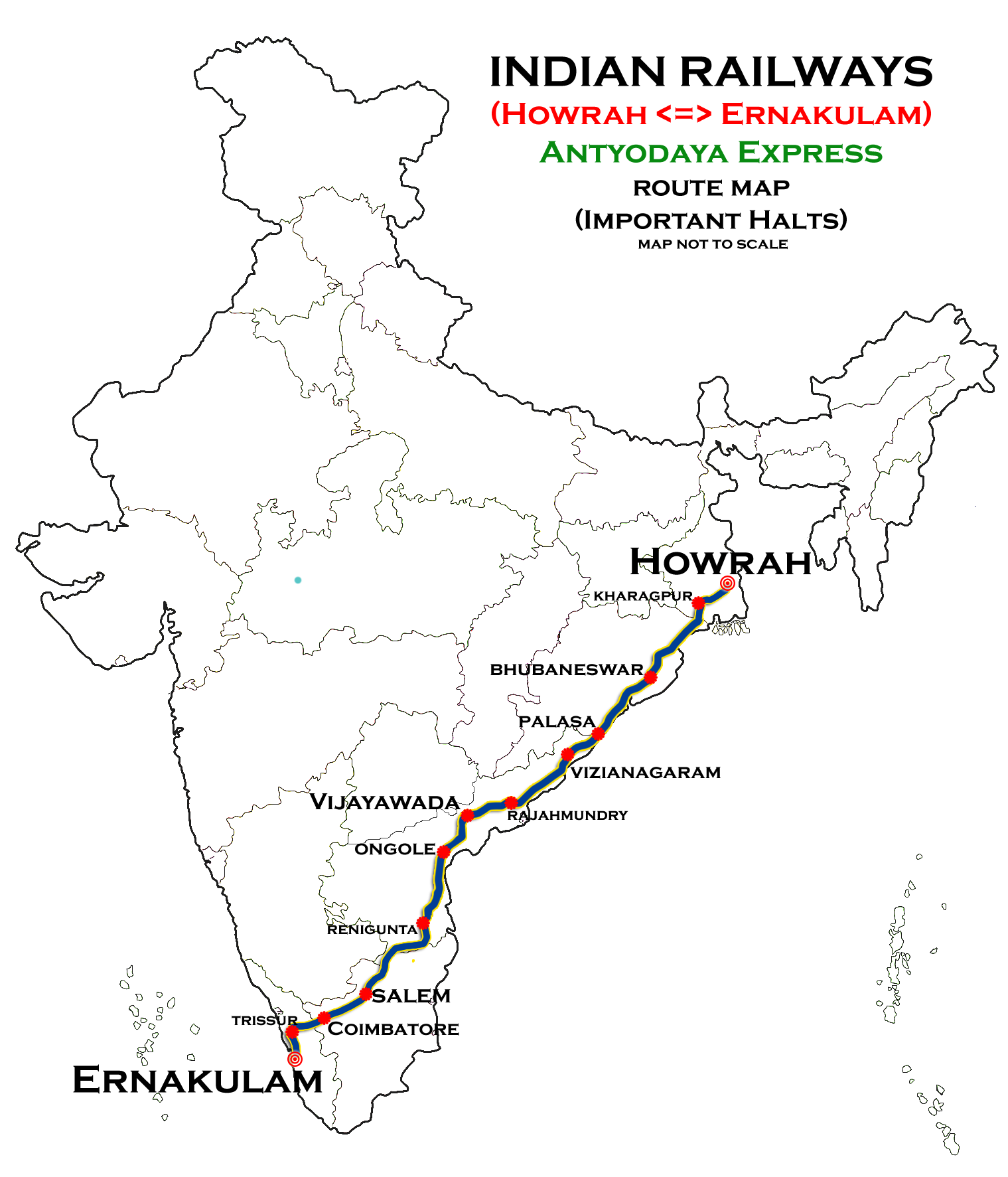

The Howrah – Ernakulam Antyodaya Superfast Express is a Fully Unreserved Superfast Express train of the Indian Railways connecting Howrah Junction in Kolkata's West Bengal and Ernakulam Junction in Kochi Kerala. It is currently being operated with 22877/22878 train numbers on a weekly basis. It has been a lifeline for the migrant workers from Eastern India. Thousands of workers use this train to travel from West Bengal and Odisha to the industrial cities in Kerala, Tamil Nadu and Andhra Pradesh.

== Coach composition ==
The train is a completely general coach train designed by the Indian Railways with features of LED screen display to show information about stations, train speed, etc. Vending machines for tea, coffee, and milk; bio toilets in compartments; CCTV cameras, facility for potable drinking water, mobile charging points, and toilet occupancy indicators are available.

== Service ==
It averages 64 km/h as 22877 Antyodaya Express starts on Saturday and covering 2285 km in 37 hrs and 64 km/h as 22878 Antyodaya Express starts on Tuesday, covering 1968 km in 37 hrs 15 mins.

This train serves one of the busiest corridors of migrant laborer movement in India. That is from Eastern India to Southern Indian cities of Kochi, Thrissur, Palakkad, Coimbatore, Ongole, Vijayawada, Eluru, Rajahmundry, Vijaynagaram etc.

== Route & halts ==
- Howrah
- Kharagpur Junction
- Balasore
- Bhadrak
- Cuttack Junction
- Bhubaneswar
- Khurda Road Junction
- Brahmapur
- Palasa
- Srikakulam Road
- Vizianagaram Junction
- Duvvada
- Rajahmundry
- Eluru
- Vijayawada Junction
- Ongole
- Renigunta Junction
- Katpadi Junction
- Jolarpettai Junction
- Salem Junction
- Erode Junction
- Coimbatore Junction
- Palakkad Junction
- Thrissur
- Aluva
- Ernakulam Junction

== Loco link ==
earlier with stainless steel and paintless LHB coach it powered by Golden Rock-based WDP-3A. Both trains are hauled by a Santragachi / Tatanagar-based WAP-7 or WAP-4 electric locomotives.

== Operation ==
22877 – leaves Howrah Junction on Saturday and reaches Ernakulam Junction on day 3 at morning 6:00 hrs IST

22878 – leaves Ernakulam Junction every Tuesday at 00:20 hrs IST in night and reach Howrah Junction on 2nd day at 14:50 hrs IST

== See also ==
- Antyodaya Express
- Howrah–Yesvantpur Humsafar Express
