= Madgaon–Mangaluru Intercity Express =

Intercity train service

Madgaon – Mangaluru Intercity Express
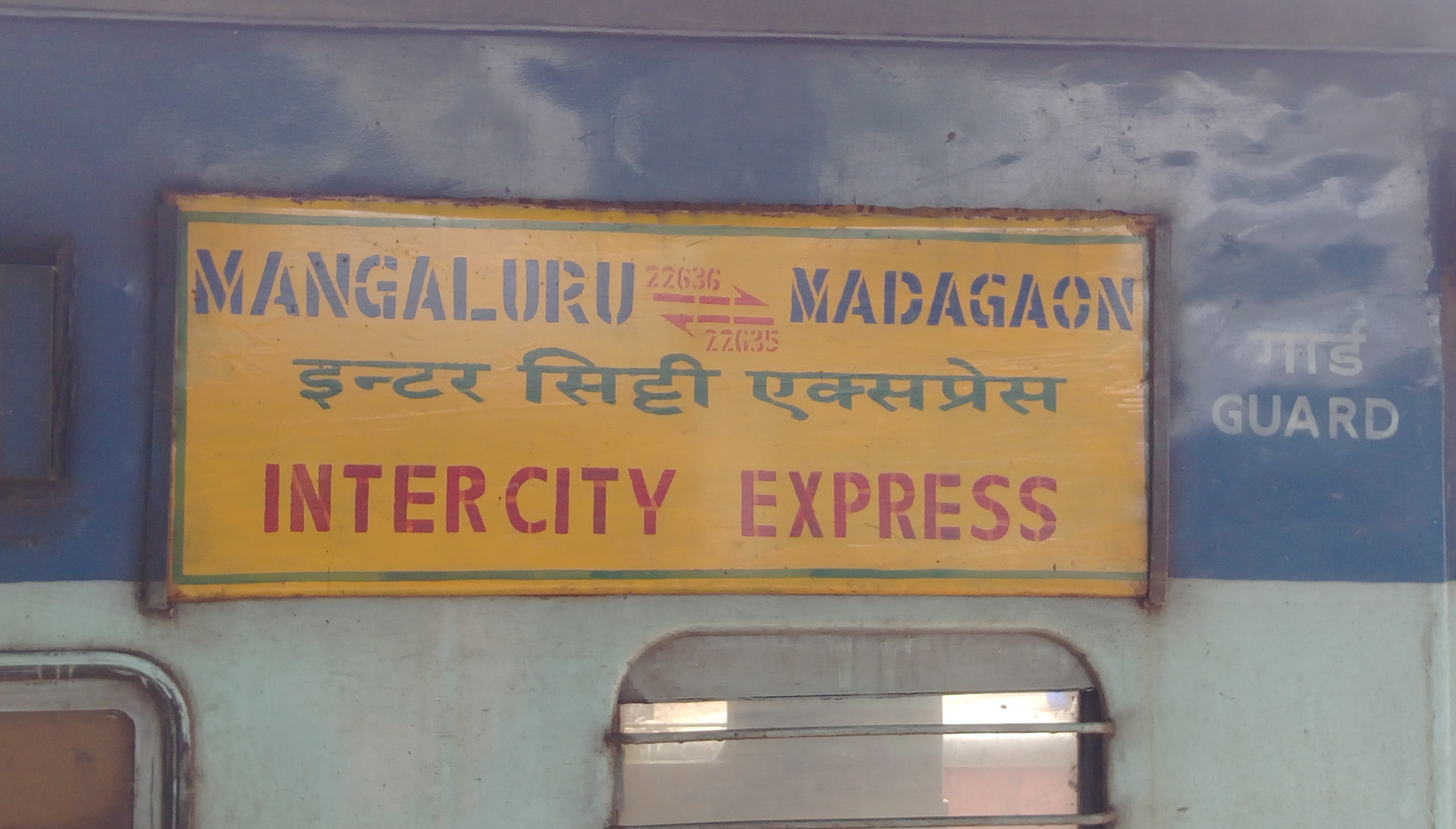

Overview
- Service type: Express
- First service: 18 January 2011; 15 years ago
- Last service: 29 March 2022
- Current operator: Southern Railway zone

Route
- Termini: Madgaon Junction; Mangaluru Central
- Stops: 8
- Distance travelled: 319 km (198 mi)
- Average journey time: 7 hours 07 mins
- Service frequency: Daily
- Train number: 22635 / 22636

On-board services
- Classes: AC Chair car, general unreserved, Chair car
- Seating arrangements: Yes
- Sleeping arrangements: No
- Catering facilities: No

Technical
- Rolling stock: Standard Indian Railways Coaches
- Track gauge: 1,676 mm (5 ft 6 in)
- Operating speed: 45 km/h (28 mph)

The "22635 / 36" Madgaon – Mangaluru Intercity Express was an express train belonging to Indian Railways Southern Railway zone that ran between Madgaon Junction and Mangaluru Central in India. Service was terminated from 29 March 2022

It operated as train number "22635" from Madgaon Junction to Mangaluru Junction and as train number "22636" in the reverse direction serving the states of Karnataka & Goa.

== Coaches ==
The "22635 / 36 Mangaluru Central – Madgaon Intercity Express" had one AC Chair Car, four non-AC chair car, four general unreserved & two SLR (seating with luggage rake) coaches . It did not carry a pantry car coach.

== Service ==
The "22635 Madgaon Junction – Mangaluru Central Intercity Express" covered the distance of approximately 300 km (200 mi) in 7 hrs 00 mins (46 km/h (29 mph)) and in 7 hrs 15 mins as the "22636 Mangaluru Central – Madgaon Junction Intercity Express" (44 km/h (27 mph)).

As the average commercial speed of the train was above 55 km/h (34 mph), as per railway rules, its fare includes a super fast surcharge.

== Routing ==
The "22635 / 36 Madgaon – Mangaluru Intercity Express" ran from Madgaon Junction via Karwar, Udupi to Mangaluru Central.

== Traction ==
An Erode Junction based WDM-3D diesel locomotive pulled the train to its destination.

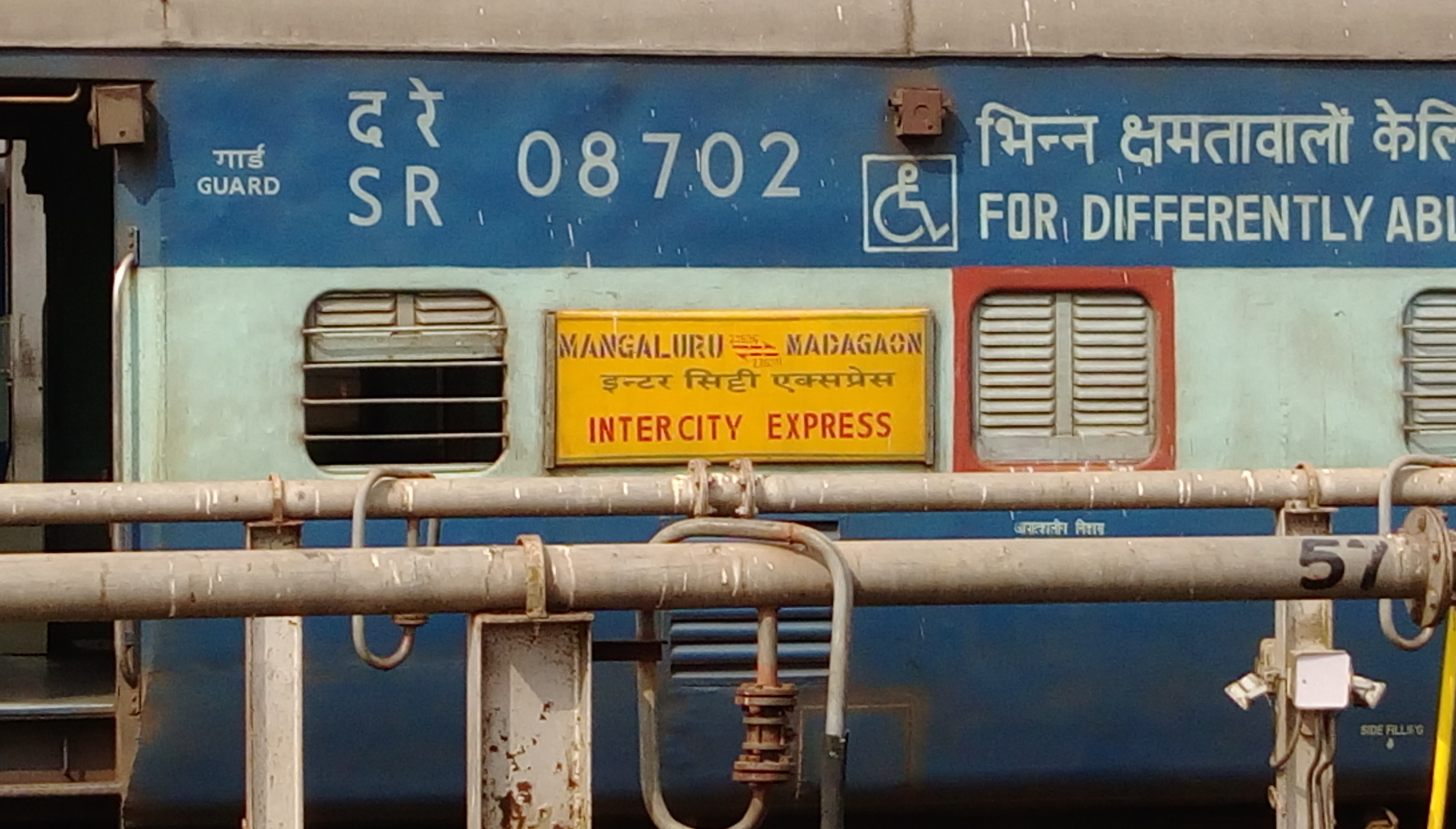
22636 Mangaluru Central Madgaon Intercity SF Express - Train board

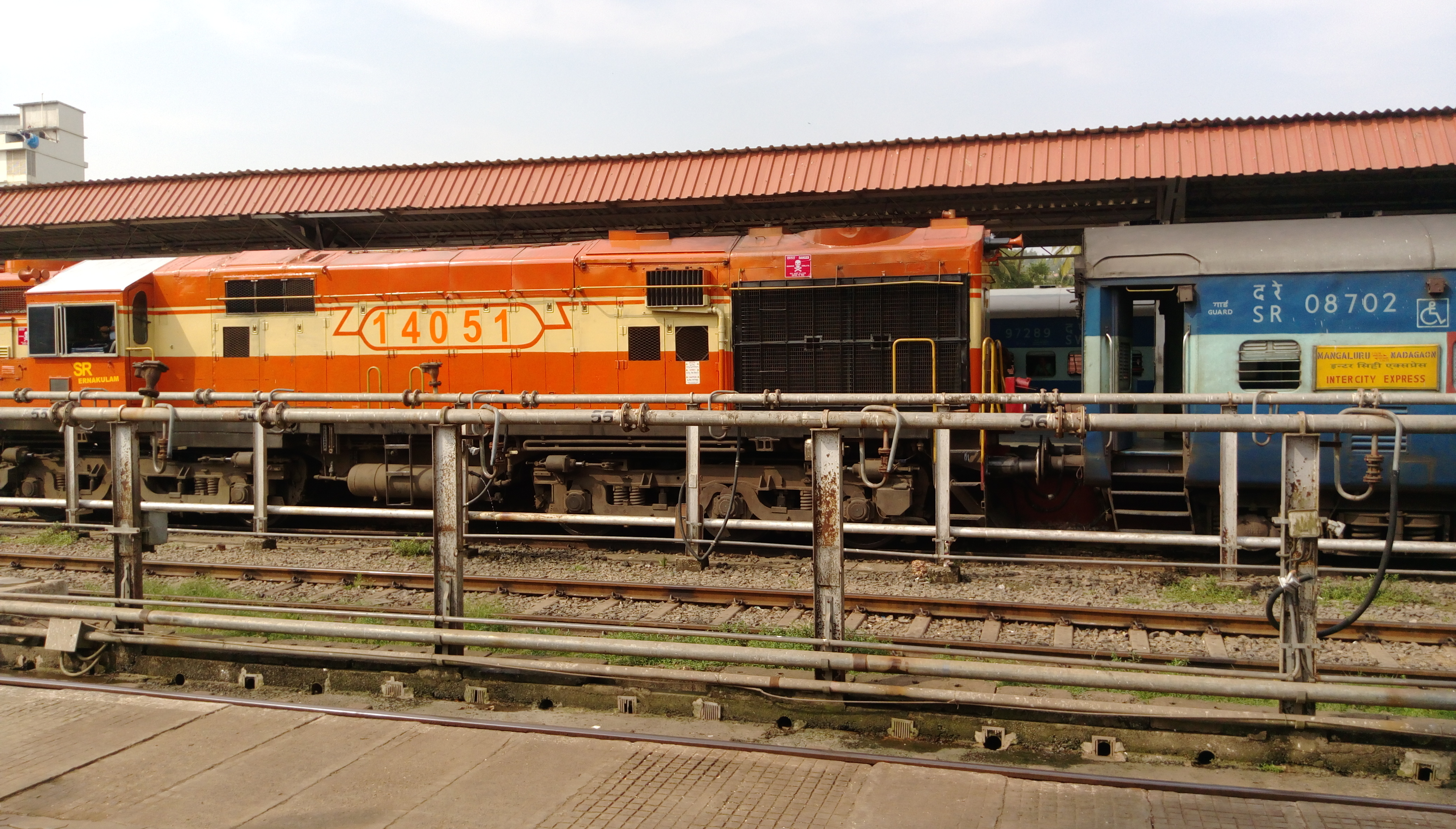
22636 Mangaluru Central Madgaon Intercity SF Express arriving at Madgaon railway station with Ernakulam based WDM 3A
