= Thiruvananthapuram North–Mangaluru Antyodaya Express (via Alappuzha) =

Express train in southwest India

Thiruvananthapuram North – Mangaluru Junction Antyodaya SF Express
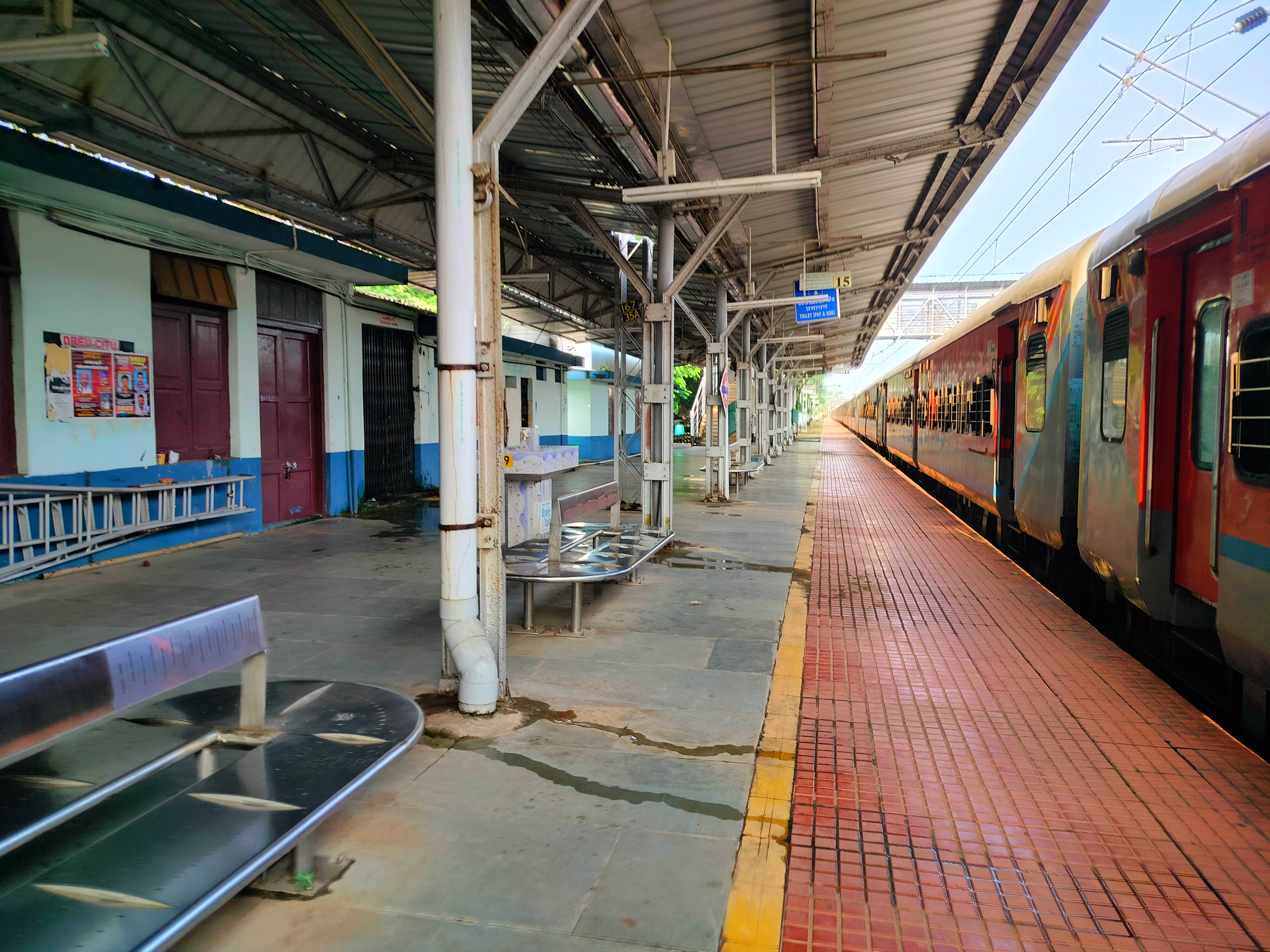
- Thiruvananthapuram North–Mangaluru Antyodaya Express at Paravur railway station

Overview
- Service type: Antyodaya Express
- Locale: Kerala & Karnataka
- First service: 9 June 2018; 8 years ago
- Current operator: Southern Railway zone

Route
- Termini: Thiruvananthapuram North (KCVL); Mangaluru Junction (MAJN)
- Stops: 13
- Distance travelled: 615 km (382 mi)
- Average journey time: 11 Hr 15 Min
- Service frequency: Bi-weekly (Note: Run twice in a week for every direction.)
- Train number: 16355 / 16356

On-board services
- Class: Unreserved
- Seating arrangements: Yes
- Sleeping arrangements: Cushion Berth
- Auto-rack arrangements: YES
- Catering facilities: No
- Observation facilities: Wide window
- Entertainment facilities: Digital display
- Baggage facilities: Yes

Technical
- Rolling stock: LHB-Antyodaya
- Track gauge: 1,676 mm (5 ft 6 in)
- Operating speed: 58 km/h (36 mph)
Route map
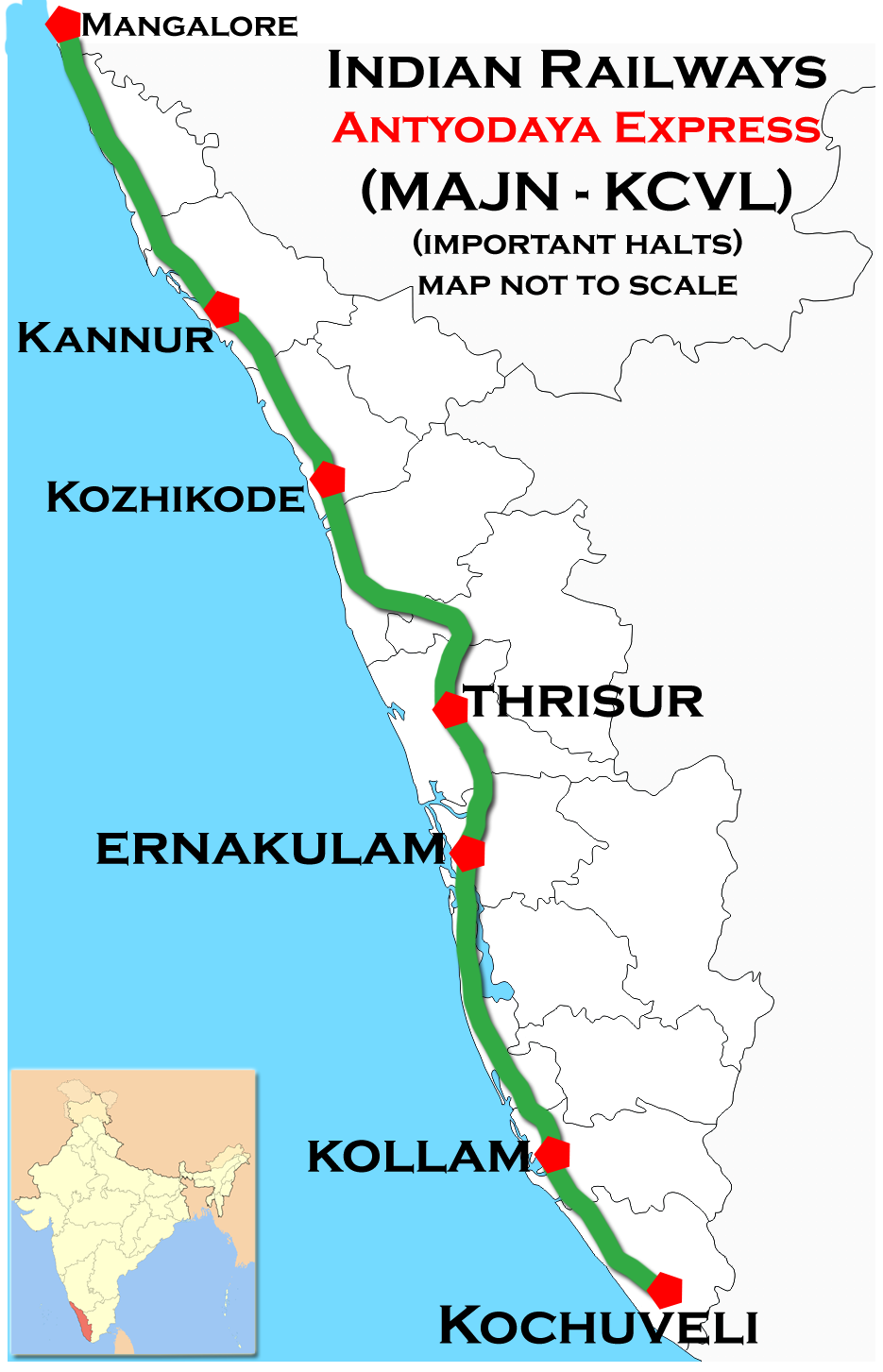

Kochuveli ( TVC North ) - Mangaluru Junction Antyodaya S.F Express is a bi weekly Superfast Express of antyodaya express category train belonging to Thiruvananthapuram division, Southern Railway zone that runs between Kochuveli in Kerala and Mangaluru Junction in Karnataka . It operates with 16355/16356 train numbers on a bi-weekly basis. It is the first unpainted stainless steel train of India. This train answers the long standing demand of the people of North Kerala for a fourth train to the capital. This is the fastest bi weekly night train that runs from Mangaluru junction to Kochuveli that covers the distance of 620 km in 11 hours 35 min

The train runs two times/week. Widespread protests erupted when the train didn't stop at Tirur, Kasaragod, and Alappuzha, questioning the need for this train. Several MLAs blocked the train at Kasaragod demanding a stop there.

== Service ==
The Mangaluru to Thiruvananthapuram North train (16356) leaves Mangaluru junction every Friday and Sunday at 8 PM and reaches Thiruvananthapuram North at 8.15 AM the next day. The reverse train (16355) leaves Thiruvananthapuram North every Thursday and Saturday at 9.25 PM and reaches Mangaluru Jn. at 9.15 AM the next day.

== Coach composition ==
The trains offers only LHB general coaches (unreserved) designed by Indian Railways. Vending machines offer water. Toilets in compartments as well as CCTV cameras and mobile charging points are present.Maintenance is done at Kochuveli.

== Traction ==
It is hauled by a Royapuram-based WAP-7 locomotive.

== Route ==
- Kochuveli
- Kollam Junction
- Kayamkulam Junction
- Alappuzha
- Ernakulam Junction
- Thrissur
- Shoranur Junction
- Tirur
- Kozhikode
- Kannur
- Kasaragod (permanent stop for now )
- Mangaluru Junction

Loco	1	2	3	4	5	6	7	8	9	10	11	12	13	14	15	16	17	18
|LOCO : WAP 7 ERODE /ROYAPURAM |EOG	UR	UR	UR	UR	UR	UR	UR	UR	UR	UR	UR	UR	UR	UR	UR	UR	EOG	

== See also ==
- Antyodaya Express
- Humsafar Express
- Kerala Sampark Kranti Express
